= 1935–36 Brentford F.C. season =

English football team season

Brentford
1935–36 season
- Chairman: Louis P. Simon
- Manager: Harry Curtis
- Stadium: Griffin Park
- First Division: 5th
- FA Cup: Third round
- London Challenge Cup: Runners-up
- Top goalscorer: League: McCulloch (26); All: McCulloch (26)
- Highest home attendance: 33,486
- Lowest home attendance: 15,379
- Average home league attendance: 25,287
Home colours

During the 1935–36 English football season, Brentford competed in the Football League First Division for the first time in the club's history. A torrid run in the opening half of the season left Brentford in the relegation places, but after a number of key signings were made, just two defeats from Christmas Day 1935 through to the end of the season elevated the Bees to an impressive 5th-place finish, the club's highest-ever in the league pyramid. Brentford also reached the final of the London Challenge Cup for the second consecutive season, but were beaten by league rivals Arsenal. In 2013, the Brentford supporters voted 1935–36 as the club's third-best season.

== Season summary ==
In preparation for the 1935–36 season, Brentford manager Harry Curtis elected to stick with the nucleus of players that had elevated the club from the Third Division South to the First Division in just three seasons, his only significant signing being right back Joe Wilson from Southend United. The Bees had a dream start to their first season in the top-flight, going to the top of the division after a 2–0 opening day victory over Bolton Wanderers. A 2–1 home defeat to Huddersfield Town two matches later gave way to a run of 11 defeats in 17 matches, which left the club in the relegation places.

Previously-prolific scorers Jack Holliday and Idris Hopkins had had a difficult time adjusting to the higher level, with scoring just 13 goals between them by the time the Bees were mired in the relegation battle at the end of 1935. Manager Curtis recognised the need to strengthen the squad in mid-season, dropping and later selling full back Jack Astley, left half Jackie Burns and forwards Charlie Fletcher and George Robson. In addition, former captain Herbert Watson was dropped from the half back line. In came Welsh international left half Dai Richards for £3,500 and Scottish forwards David McCulloch and Bobby Reid, with McCulloch signing for a club record £6,000 fee.

The signings had an inspired effect, sending the Bees on a run of just two defeats in the remaining 23 matches of the season, with forward McCulloch netting an impressive 26 goals in 27 appearances to finish as top-scorer. Manager Harry Curtis also signed a new five-year contract in February 1936. Brentford finished their debut season in the First Division in 5th place, which as of the end of the 2015–16 season is the club's highest-ever in the pyramid. Brentford also reached the final of the London Challenge Cup for the second-successive season, but were defeated 4–2 by league rivals Arsenal. The Bees' club record attendance for a home Football League match was broken twice during the season, with 33,481 attending versus Huddersfield Town on 7 September 1935 and 33,486 for the West London derby with Chelsea on 28 March 1936.

== League table ==
Pos	Team	Pld	W	D	L	GF	GA	GAv	Pts
3	Huddersfield Town	42	18	12	12	59	56	1.054	48
4	Stoke City	42	20	7	15	57	57	1.000	47
5	Brentford	42	17	12	13	81	60	1.350	46
6	Arsenal	42	15	15	12	78	48	1.625	45
7	Preston North End	42	18	8	16	67	64	1.047	44

Source: World Football
Rules for classification: 1) Points; 2) Goal average; 3) Goals scored

== Results ==
Brentford's goal tally listed first.

=== Legend ===
Win	Draw	Loss

=== Football League First Division ===
No.	Date	Opponent	Venue	Result	Attendance	Scorer(s)
1	31 August 1935	Bolton Wanderers	A	2–0	31,949	Holliday (2)
2	5 September 1935	Blackburn Rovers	H	3–1	25,047	Fletcher (2), Holliday
3	7 September 1935	Huddersfield Town	H	1–2	33,481	Hopkins
4	14 September 1935	Middlesbrough	A	0–0	38,107	
5	18 September 1935	Derby County	A	1–2	21,648	Fletcher
6	21 September 1935	Aston Villa	H	1–2	29,781	Holliday
7	28 September 1935	Wolverhampton Wanderers	A	2–3	28,431	Holliday, Scott
8	5 October 1935	Sheffield Wednesday	H	2–2	25,338	Robson, Scott
9	12 October 1935	Portsmouth	A	3–1	22,316	Hopkins (2), Holliday
10	19 October 1935	Stoke City	H	0–0	24,960	
11	26 October 1935	Manchester City	A	1–2	29,868	Hopkins
12	2 November 1935	Arsenal	H	2–1	26,330	Burns, Hopkins
13	9 November 1935	Birmingham	A	1–2	28,673	Dunn
14	16 November 1935	Sunderland	H	1–5	24,720	Hopkins
15	23 November 1935	Chelsea	A	1–2	56,624	Robson (pen)
16	30 November 1935	Leeds United	H	2–2	23,914	Scott, McCulloch
17	7 December 1935	Grimsby Town	A	1–6	5,276	Fletcher
18	14 December 1935	Liverpool	H	1–2	18,508	Robson
19	21 December 1935	West Bromwich Albion	A	0–1	14,272	
20	25 December 1935	Preston North End	H	5–2	21,474	Holliday, Muttitt, McCulloch (2), Scott
21	26 December 1935	Preston North End	A	4–2	22,937	Hopkins (3), McCulloch
22	28 December 1935	Bolton Wanderers	H	4–0	27,156	McCulloch (3), McKenzie
23	1 January 1936	Blackburn Rovers	A	0–1	24,724	
24	4 January 1936	Huddersfield Town	A	2–2	17,682	McCulloch, Fletcher
25	18 January 1936	Middlesbrough	H	1–0	27,779	Scott
26	25 January 1936	Aston Villa	A	2–2	40,328	Reid, Scott
27	1 February 1936	Wolverhampton Wanderers	H	5–0	25,123	Morris (og), McCulloch (2), Scott, Holliday
28	8 February 1936	Sheffield Wednesday	A	3–3	20,757	Holliday, McCulloch, Hopkins
29	22 February 1936	Stoke City	A	2–2	18,045	McCulloch, Scott
30	29 February 1936	Birmingham	H	0–1	20,523	
31	7 March 1936	Leeds United	A	2–1	10,509	Reid, Hopkins
32	14 March 1936	Manchester City	H	0–0	28,364	
33	21 March 1936	Sunderland	A	3–1	26,348	Holliday, McCulloch (2)
34	25 March 1936	Portsmouth	H	3–1	15,379	McCulloch (3)
35	28 March 1936	Chelsea	H	2–1	33,486	McCulloch, Hopkins
36	4 April 1936	Arsenal	A	1–1	28,303	Holliday
37	10 April 1936	Everton	A	2–1	45,477	McCulloch (2)
38	11 April 1936	Grimsby Town	H	3–0	24,830	McCulloch (2), Hopkins
39	13 April 1936	Everton	H	4–1	29,790	Holliday, Hopkins (2), Scott
40	18 April 1936	Liverpool	A	0–0	28,463	
41	25 April 1936	West Bromwich Albion	H	2–2	24,527	Scott, Reid
42	2 May 1936	Derby County	H	6–0	20,521	McCulloch (4), Holliday, Scott

=== FA Cup ===
Round	Date	Opponent	Venue	Result	Attendance
3R	11 January 1936	Leicester City	A	0–1	29,750

- Sources: Statto, 11v11, 100 Years of Brentford

== Playing squad ==
Players' ages are as of the opening day of the 1935–36 season.

Pos.	Name	Nat.	Date of birth (age)	Signed from	Signed in	Notes
Goalkeepers
GK	James Mathieson	(Scotland)	10 May 1904 (aged 31)	Middlesbrough	1934	
Defenders
DF	Arthur Bateman (c)	(England)	1 April 1909 (aged 26)	Southend United	1934	
DF	George Dumbrell	(England)	23 September 1906 (aged 28)	Bournemouth & Boscombe Athletic	1934	
DF	Walter Metcalf	(England)	15 December 1910 (aged 24)	Sunderland	1934	
DF	George Poyser	(England)	6 February 1910 (aged 25)	Port Vale	1934	
DF	Joe Wilson	(England)	29 September 1911 (aged 23)	Southend United	1935	
Midfielders
HB	Joe James	(England)	13 January 1910 (aged 25)	Battersea Church	1929	
HB	Duncan McKenzie	(Scotland)	10 August 1912 (aged 23)	Albion Rovers	1932	
HB	Dai Richards	(Wales)	31 October 1906 (aged 28)	Wolverhampton Wanderers	1935	
HB	Cecil Smith	(England)	16 June 1907 (aged 28)	Brentford Market	1931	
Forwards
FW	Jim Brown	(United States)	31 December 1908 (aged 26)	Manchester United	1934	
FW	Billy Dunn	(Scotland)	9 October 1910 (aged 24)	Celtic	1935	
FW	Jack Holliday	(England)	19 December 1908 (aged 26)	Middlesbrough	1932	
FW	Idris Hopkins	(Wales)	11 October 1910 (aged 24)	Crystal Palace	1932	
FW	David McCulloch	(Scotland)	5 October 1912 (aged 22)	Heart of Midlothian	1935	
FW	Ernest Muttitt	(England)	24 July 1908 (aged 27)	Middlesbrough	1932	
FW	Bobby Reid	(Scotland)	19 February 1911 (aged 24)	Hamilton Academical	1936	
FW	Billy Scott	(England)	6 December 1907 (aged 27)	Middlesbrough	1932	
Players who left the club mid-season
DF	Jack Astley	(England)	3 December 1909 (aged 25)	Southport	1933	Transferred to Coventry City
HB	Jackie Burns	(England)	27 November 1906 (aged 28)	Queens Park Rangers	1931	Amateur, transferred to Leyton
HB	Herbert Watson	(England)	20 November 1908 (aged 26)	Middlesbrough	1932	Transferred to Bristol Rovers
FW	Charlie Fletcher	(England)	28 October 1905 (aged 29)	Clapton Orient	1933	Transferred to Burnley
FW	George Robson	(England)	17 June 1908 (aged 27)	West Ham United	1931	Transferred to Heart of Midlothian

- Sources: 100 Years of Brentford, Timeless Bees, Football League Players' Records 1888 to 1939

== Coaching staff ==
Name	Role
(England) Harry Curtis	Manager
(Scotland) Jimmy Bain	Assistant Manager
(England) Bob Kane	Trainer
(England) Jack Cartmell	Assistant Trainer
(England) Fred Keatch	Secretary

== Statistics ==
=== Appearances and goals ===

Brentford's highest appearance-makers in each position during the Football League season.

Pos	Nat	Name	League		FA Cup		Total	
Pos	Nat	Name	Apps	Goals	Apps	Goals	Apps	Goals
GK	(Scotland)	James Mathieson	42	0	1	0	43	0
DF	(England)	Jack Astley	8	0	0	0	8	0
DF	(England)	Arthur Bateman	23	0	0	0	23	0
DF	(England)	George Dumbrell	1	0	0	0	1	0
DF	(England)	Walter Metcalf	1	0	0	0	1	0
DF	(England)	George Poyser	28	0	1	0	29	0
DF	(England)	Joe Wilson	22	0	1	0	23	0
HB	(England)	Jackie Burns	9	1	—		9	1
HB	(England)	Joe James	41	0	1	0	42	0
HB	(Scotland)	Duncan McKenzie	38	1	1	0	39	1
HB	(Wales)	Dai Richards	26	0	1	0	27	0
HB	(England)	Cecil Smith	1	0	0	0	1	0
HB	(England)	Herbert Watson	13	0	0	0	13	0
FW	(United States)	Jim Brown	1	0	0	0	1	0
FW	(Scotland)	Billy Dunn	2	1	0	0	2	1
FW	(England)	Charlie Fletcher	20	5	0	0	20	5
FW	(England)	Jack Holliday	37	13	1	0	38	13
FW	(Wales)	Idris Hopkins	42	15	1	0	43	15
FW	(Scotland)	David McCulloch	26	26	1	0	27	26
FW	(England)	Ernest Muttitt	5	1	1	0	6	1
FW	(Scotland)	Bobby Reid	18	3	—		18	3
FW	(England)	George Robson	18	3	0	0	18	3
FW	(England)	Billy Scott	39	11	1	0	40	11

- Players listed in italics left the club mid-season.
- Source: 100 Years of Brentford

=== Goalscorers ===
Pos.	Nat	Player	FL1	FAC	Total
FW	(Scotland)	David McCulloch	26	0	26
FW	(Wales)	Idris Hopkins	15	0	15
FW	(England)	Jack Holliday	13	0	13
FW	(England)	Billy Scott	11	0	11
FW	(England)	Charlie Fletcher	5	0	5
FW	(Scotland)	Bobby Reid	3	—	3
FW	(England)	George Robson	3	0	3
HB	(England)	Jackie Burns	1	0	1
FW	(Scotland)	Billy Dunn	1	0	1
HB	(Scotland)	Duncan McKenzie	1	0	1
FW	(England)	Ernest Muttitt	1	0	1
Opponents			1	0	1
Total			81	0	81

- Players listed in italics left the club mid-season.
- Source: 100 Years of Brentford

=== International caps ===
Pos.	Nat	Player	Caps	Goals	Ref
FW	(Wales)	Idris Hopkins	2	0	
FW	(Scotland)	David McCulloch	1	0	
FW	(Wales)	Dai Richards	2	1	

=== Management ===
Name	Nat	From	To	Record All Comps					Record League				
Name	Nat	From	To	P	W	D	L	W %	P	W	D	L	W %
Harry Curtis	(England)	31 August 1935	2 May 1936	43	17	12	14	39.53|	42	17	12	13	40.48

=== Summary ===
Games played	43 (42 First Division, 1 FA Cup)
Games won	17 (17 First Division, 0 FA Cup)
Games drawn	12 (12 First Division, 0 FA Cup)
Games lost	14 (13 First Division, 1 FA Cup)
Goals scored	81 (81 First Division, 0 FA Cup)
Goals conceded	61 (60 First Division, 1 FA Cup)
Clean sheets	10 (10 First Division, 0 FA Cup)
Biggest league win	6–0 versus Derby County, 2 May 1936
Worst league defeat	6–1 versus Grimsby Town, 7 December 1935
Most appearances	43, Idris Hopkins, James Mathieson (42 First Division, 1 FA Cup)
Top scorer (league)	26, David McCulloch
Top scorer (all competitions)	26, David McCulloch

== Transfers & loans ==
Cricketers are not included in this list.

Players transferred in
Date	Pos.	Name	Previous club	Fee	Ref.
May 1935	GK	(Wales) Thomas Lynch	(England) Yeovil & Petters United	n/a	
7 June 1935	FW	(Scotland) Billy Dunn	(Scotland) Celtic	n/a	
18 July 1935	FW	(England) Les Sullivan	(England) Rochdale	Exchange	
July 1935	DF	(England) Joe Wilson	(England) Southend United	Free	
August 1935	HB	(England) Sam Briddon	(England) Port Vale	Free	
30 November 1935	FW	(Scotland) David McCulloch	(Scotland) Heart of Midlothian	£6,000	
30 November 1935	HB	(Wales) Dai Richards	(England) Wolverhampton Wanderers	£3,500	
1935	FW	(England) Isaac Fenton	(England) Burnley	n/a	
1935	HB	H. Marley	(England) Leyton	n/a	
17 January 1936	FW	(Scotland) Bobby Reid	(Scotland) Hamilton Academical	n/a	
Players transferred out
Date	Pos.	Name	Subsequent club	Fee	Ref.
18 July 1935	FW	(England) Matt Johnson	(England) Rochdale	Exchange	
19 December 1935	FW	(England) George Robson	(Scotland) Heart of Midlothian	n/a	
December 1935	HB	(England) Jackie Burns	(England) Leyton	Amateur	
February 1936	DF	(England) Jack Astley	(England) Coventry City	n/a	
February 1936	FW	(England) Charlie Fletcher	(England) Burnley	n/a	
22 April 1936	HB	(England) James Raven	(England) Bristol Rovers	n/a	
22 April 1936	FW	(England) Les Sullivan	(England) Bristol Rovers	n/a	
22 April 1936	HB	(England) Herbert Watson	(England) Bristol Rovers	n/a	
Players loaned out
Date	Pos.	Name	Subsequent club	Date to	Ref.
1935	FW	(England) Les Smith	(England) Hayes	1936	
Players released
Date	Pos.	Name	Subsequent club	Join date	Ref.
May 1936	FW	(United States) Jim Brown	(England) Tottenham Hotspur	1936	
