= James Mathieson =

Scottish footballer

Personal information
- Full name: James Adamson Mathieson
- Date of birth: 10 May 1904
- Place of birth: Methil, Scotland
- Date of death: 13 April 1950 (aged 45)
- Height: 6 ft 1 1/2 in (1.87 m)
- Position: Goalkeeper

Youth career
- Dubbleside Hearts
- Colinsburgh United

Senior career*
Years	Team	Apps	(Gls)
1922–1923	Partick Thistle		
1923–1926	Raith Rovers	92	(0)
1926–1934	Middlesbrough	245	(0)
1934–1938	Brentford	126	(0)
1938–1939	Queen of the South	38	(0)
Total		502	(0)
- * Club domestic league appearances and goals

James Adamson Mathieson (10 May 1904 – 13 April 1950) was a Scottish professional footballer who played as a goalkeeper in the Football League for Middlesbrough and Brentford. He made over 500 professional appearances in the English and Scottish leagues. Mathieson is the only player to win three English Second Division championship medals, as an ever-present in each season.

== Career ==
=== Early years ===
A goalkeeper, Mathieson began his career in Scotland with junior clubs Doubleside Hearts and Colinsburgh United. He got his break when he signed for Scottish League First Division club Partick Thistle in 1922. Mathieson moved to fellow top flight club Raith Rovers the following year and made 92 league appearances in three seasons before departing after Rovers' relegation to the Second Division was confirmed at the end of the 1925–26 season.

=== Middlesbrough ===
Mathieson moved to England to join Second Division club Middlesbrough in June 1926. He was an ever-present in the Boro team which was promoted to the First Division as Second Division champions in the 1926–27 season, giving Mathieson his first taste of top flight football in England. Middlesbrough were relegated straight back to the Second Division, but with Mathieson again an ever-present in goal, the club won promotion straight back as Division Two champions in the 1928–29 season. He made 264 appearances for the club before departing in 1934.

=== Brentford ===
Mathieson dropped to the Second Division to sign for Brentford during the 1934 off-season. He was one of a number of former Middlesbrough players recruited by Bees manager Harry Curtis in the early 1930s and he linked up with former teammates Jack Holliday, Billy Scott, Herbert Watson and Ernie Muttitt at Griffin Park. Mathieson went straight into the team and was an ever-present during the 1934–35 season, helping Brentford to the Second Division title and promotion to the top-flight for the first time in the club's history. He missed just one league game during the 1935–36 season, as the Bees finished in their highest-ever league placing of fifth in the First Division. Mathieson lost his place in goal to another Scot, Joe Crozier, during the 1937–38 season and departed the club at the end of the campaign. He made 129 appearances during his four years with Brentford.

=== Queen of the South ===
Mathieson returned to Scotland in 1938 and joined Dumfries club Queen of the South, then in Scotland's top tier. Things went well for Mathieson during the 1938–39 season at Queens, with the club finishing in sixth position and reaching the quarter-finals of the Scottish Cup. He made 38 league appearances before the breakout of the Second World War ended his career in 1939.

== Personal life ==
Before becoming a professional footballer, Mathieson worked as a miner.

== Career statistics ==
Appearances and goals by club, season and competition
Club	Season	League			National Cup		Total	
Club	Season	Division	Apps	Goals	Apps	Goals	Apps	Goals
Raith Rovers	1923–24	Scottish First Division	17	0	1	0	18	0
Raith Rovers	1924–25	Scottish First Division	37	0	4	0	41	0
Raith Rovers	1925–26	Scottish First Division	38	0	2	0	40	0
Raith Rovers	Total		92	0	7	0	99	0
Middlesbrough	1926–27	Second Division	42	0	3	0	45	0
Middlesbrough	1927–28	First Division	42	0	3	0	45	0
Middlesbrough	1928–29	Second Division	40	0	3	0	43	0
Middlesbrough	1929–30	First Division	41	0	6	0	47	0
Middlesbrough	1930–31	First Division	38	0	2	0	40	0
Middlesbrough	1931–32	First Division	30	0	2	0	32	0
Middlesbrough	1932–33	First Division	12	0	0	0	12	0
Middlesbrough	Total		245	0	19	0	264	0
Brentford	1934–35	Second Division	42	0	1	0	43	0
Brentford	1935–36	First Division	42	0	1	0	43	0
Brentford	1936–37	First Division	35	0	2	0	37	0
Brentford	1937–38	First Division	7	0	0	0	7	0
Brentford	Total		126	0	4	0	130	0
Queen of the South	1938–39	Scottish First Division	38	0	3	0	41	0
Career total			501	0	33	0	534	0

== Honours ==
Middlesbrough

- Football League Second Division: 1926–27, 1928–29

Brentford

- Football League Second Division: 1934–35
