= Walter Metcalf (footballer) =

English footballer

Personal information
- Full name: Walter Frederick Metcalf
- Date of birth: 15 December 1910
- Place of birth: Scarborough, England
- Date of death: 1981 (aged 70–71)
- Place of death: Scarborough, England
- Height: 6 ft 1/2 in (1.84 m)
- Position: Left back

Senior career*
Years	Team	Apps	(Gls)
1931–1932	Scarborough	6	(0)
1932–1934	Sunderland	0	(0)
1934–1937	Brentford	7	(0)
1937–1946	Coventry City	76	(1)
1941–1942	→ Nottingham Forest (guest)	18	(0)
- → Northampton Town (guest)
- * Club domestic league appearances and goals

Walter Frederick Metcalf (15 December 1910 – 1981) was an English professional footballer who played in the Football League for Brentford and Coventry City as a left back.

== Club career ==
=== Early years ===
A left back, Metcalf began his career with hometown Midland League club Scarborough in 1931. He made just six league appearances before earning a move to First Division club Sunderland in 1932. Metcalf failed to make a senior appearance for the Rokerites and departed in March 1934.

=== Brentford ===
Metcalf transferred to Second Division club Brentford in March 1934 for a four-figure fee. With first Jack Astley and then new signings Arthur Bateman and George Poyser ahead of him in the full back pecking order, Metcalf had to wait until 29 September 1934 to make his professional debut, which came in a 2–1 defeat to Hull City. He spent much of his time in the reserve team, with which he won the 1934-35 London Challenge Cup. Metcalf made just six further first team appearances for the Bees before departing Griffin Park in 1937.

=== Coventry City ===
Metcalf joined Second Division club Coventry City in 1937 and made 78 appearances during the 1937–38 and 1938–39 seasons before professional football was suspended due to the outbreak of the Second World War in September 1939. Metcalf remained with Coventry during the war and made 130 appearances, in addition to playing as a guest for Nottingham Forest and Northampton Town. After hostilities ceased in 1945, Metcalf made two FA Cup appearances during the 1945–46 season and retired at the end of the campaign.

== Personal life ==
After retiring from football, Metcalf worked as a prison officer in Malaysia for 15 years. He later returned to his native Scarborough.

== Career statistics ==
Appearances and goals by club, season and competition
Club	Season	League			FA Cup		Total	
Club	Season	Division	Apps	Goals	Apps	Goals	Apps	Goals
Brentford	1934–35	Second Division	1	0	0	0	1	0
Brentford	1935–36	First Division	1	0	0	0	1	0
Brentford	1936–37	First Division	5	0	0	0	5	0
Brentford	Total		7	0	0	0	7	0
Coventry City	1937–38	Second Division	42	0	1	0	43	0
Coventry City	1938–39	Second Division	34	1	1	0	35	1
Coventry City	1945–46	—			2	0	2	0
Coventry City	Total		76	1	4	0	80	1
Career total			83	1	4	0	87	1

== Honours ==
Brentford Reserves

- London Challenge Cup: 1934–35
