= 1936–37 Brentford F.C. season =

English football team season

Brentford
1936–37 season
- Chairman: Louis P. Simon
- Manager: Harry Curtis
- Stadium: Griffin Park
- First Division: 6th
- FA Cup: Fourth round
- Top goalscorer: League: McCulloch (31); All: McCulloch (33)
- Highest home attendance: 31,745
- Lowest home attendance: 14,103
- Average home league attendance: 25,544
Home colours

During the 1936–37 English football season, Brentford competed in the Football League First Division and secured a 6th-place finish, one place below the previous season's club record highest league position.

== Season summary ==
After a club record 5th-place finish in Brentford's debut season in the top flight, manager Harry Curtis kept faith with the season's previous squad, releasing outside forward Jim Brown and bringing in youngsters Harry Bamford and Joe Murray. Teenage outside right Les Smith, who had signed his first professional contract a year earlier, was promoted to the first team squad after Bobby Reid was struck down by appendicitis on the eve of the season.

After a mixed start to the season, Brentford kicked into gear in late September 1936, losing just four of 19 matches to establish themselves in the top three in the First Division. In his first full season with the Bees, forward David McCulloch again showed prolific form, going on to score 33 goals in his 43 appearances. Five goals in a six match spell also saw forward Billy Scott win an England cap in a British Home Championship match versus Wales in October 1937, which made him Brentford's first full England international player. Brentford's form dipped in mid-February 1937 and despite the signing of Buster Brown to replace the departed Dai Richards at left half, the club dropped to a 6th-place finish.

A 6–2 defeat to champions-elect Manchester City on 3 April equalled the club record for most goals conceded in a Football League match. Despite a number of other heavy defeats, manager Harry Curtis did improve the team's winning percentage in both the league and FA Cup, with Brentford hammering Huddersfield Town 5–0 in the third round (the first time the Bees had scored in the FA Cup for over four years) before exiting at the hands of Derby County in the following round.

At the end of the season, Brentford set off on a tour of Nazi Germany, beating Hamburger SV (3–0), Hertha BSC (4–0), drawing 2–2 with champions 1. FC Nürnberg and losing 4–0 to Schalke 04. The Star published a picture of the team giving a Nazi salute prior to the Schalke match, which caused a minor stir in London.

== League table ==
Pos	Team	Pld	W	D	L	GF	GA	GAv	Pts
4	Derby County	42	21	7	14	96	90	1.067	49
5	Wolverhampton Wanderers	42	21	5	16	84	67	1.254	47
6	Brentford	42	18	10	14	82	78	1.051	46
7	Middlesbrough	42	19	8	15	74	71	1.042	46
8	Sunderland	42	19	6	17	89	87	1.023	44

Source: World Football
Rules for classification: 1) Points; 2) Goal average; 3) Goals scored

== Results ==
Brentford's goal tally listed first.

=== Legend ===
Win	Draw	Loss

=== Football League First Division ===
No.	Date	Opponent	Venue	Result	Attendance	Scorer(s)
1	29 August 1936	Bolton Wanderers	H	2–2	27,524	McCulloch, Wilson (pen)
2	3 September 1936	Arsenal	H	2–0	31,056	Hopkins, McCulloch
3	5 September 1936	Everton	A	0–3	37,524	
4	9 September 1936	Arsenal	A	1–1	44,010	Wilson (pen)
5	12 September 1936	Huddersfield Town	H	1–1	25,386	McCulloch
6	17 September 1936	Charlton Athletic	H	4–2	21,373	L. Smith, McCulloch, W. Scott, McKenzie (pen)
7	19 September 1936	Sunderland	A	1–4	37,407	Hopkins
8	26 September 1936	Wolverhampton Wanderers	H	3–2	23,256	McCulloch (2), McKenzie (pen)
9	3 October 1936	Derby County	A	3–2	24,545	W. Scott (2), McCulloch
10	10 October 1936	Manchester United	H	4–0	28,019	Reid, W. Scott (2), McCulloch
11	17 October 1936	Grimsby Town	A	0–2	11,858	
12	24 October 1936	Liverpool	H	5–2	25,934	McCulloch (3), Holliday, Reid
13	31 October 1936	Leeds United	A	1–3	21,498	Holliday
14	7 November 1936	Birmingham	H	2–1	22,905	McCulloch (2)
15	14 November 1936	Middlesbrough	A	0–3	23,064	
16	21 November 1936	West Bromwich Albion	H	2–1	20,575	Reid, McCulloch
17	5 December 1936	Portsmouth	H	4–0	26,371	McCulloch (2), Holliday (2)
18	12 December 1936	Chelsea	A	1–2	51,079	Reid
19	19 December 1936	Stoke City	H	2–1	18,167	Holliday, Tutin (og)
20	25 December 1936	Sheffield Wednesday	H	2–1	26,560	Reid, W. Scott
21	26 December 1936	Bolton Wanderers	A	2–2	36,962	McCulloch, W. Scott
22	28 December 1936	Sheffield Wednesday	A	2–0	20,374	W. Scott, Hopkins
23	2 January 1937	Everton	H	2–2	20,457	Hopkins, McKenzie (pen)
24	9 January 1937	Huddersfield Town	A	1–1	21,753	McCulloch
25	23 January 1937	Sunderland	H	3–3	29,389	W. Scott (3)
26	6 February 1937	Derby County	H	6–2	31,745	Reid (2), Holliday (2), McCulloch (2)
27	10 February 1937	Wolverhampton Wanderers	A	0–4	19,373	
28	13 February 1937	Manchester United	A	3–1	31,942	W. Scott, Reid (2)
29	27 February 1937	Liverpool	A	2–2	25,005	Reid (pen), McCulloch
30	3 March 1937	Grimsby Town	H	2–3	14,103	McCulloch (2)
31	6 March 1937	Leeds United	H	4–1	16,588	Holliday, McCulloch (2), Holley (og)
32	13 March 1937	Birmingham	A	0–4	30,510	
33	20 March 1937	Middlesbrough	H	4–1	23,872	L. Smith, McCulloch (3)
34	26 March 1937	Preston North End	H	1–1	31,069	McCulloch
35	27 March 1937	West Bromwich Albion	A	0–1	29,858	
36	29 March 1937	Preston North End	A	1–1	26,782	W. Scott
37	3 April 1937	Manchester City	H	2–6	29,028	W. Scott, Hopkins
38	7 April 1937	Manchester City	A	1–2	24,629	McCulloch
39	10 April 1937	Portsmouth	A	3–1	19,208	Hopkins, McCulloch, Muttitt
40	17 April 1937	Chelsea	H	1–0	22,042	McKenzie (pen)
41	24 April 1937	Stoke City	A	1–5	18,451	McKenzie
42	1 May 1937	Charlton Athletic	A	1–2	26,195	W. Scott

=== FA Cup ===
Round	Date	Opponent	Venue	Result	Attendance	Scorer(s)
3R	16 January 1937	Huddersfield Town	H	5–0	n/a	Reid (2, 1 pen), McCulloch (2), Holliday
4R	30 January 1937	Derby County	A	0–3	27,376	

- Sources: Statto, 11v11, 100 Years of Brentford

== Playing squad ==
Players' ages are as of the opening day of the 1936–37 season.

Pos.	Name	Nat.	Date of birth (age)	Signed from	Signed in	Notes
Goalkeepers
GK	James Mathieson	(Scotland)	10 May 1904 (aged 32)	Middlesbrough	1934	
GK	James Nicholls	(England)	24 September 1908 (aged 27)	Manchester City	1934	
Defenders
DF	Arthur Bateman (c)	(England)	1 April 1909 (aged 27)	Southend United	1934	
DF	George Dumbrell	(England)	23 September 1906 (aged 29)	Bournemouth & Boscombe Athletic	1935	
DF	Walter Metcalf	(England)	15 December 1910 (aged 25)	Sunderland	1934	
DF	George Poyser	(England)	6 February 1910 (aged 26)	Port Vale	1934	
DF	Joe Wilson	(England)	29 September 1911 (aged 24)	Southend United	1935	
Midfielders
HB	Buster Brown	(England)	6 September 1910 (aged 25)	Huddersfield Town	1937	
HB	Joe James	(England)	13 January 1910 (aged 26)	Battersea Church	1929	
HB	Duncan McKenzie	(Scotland)	10 August 1912 (aged 24)	Albion Rovers	1932	
HB	Joe Murray	(Scotland)	1914 (aged 21–22)	Ayr United	1936	
HB	Archie Scott	(Scotland)	22 July 1905 (aged 31)	Derby County	1934	
Forwards
FW	Billy Dunn	(Scotland)	9 October 1910 (aged 25)	Celtic	1935	
FW	Jack Holliday	(England)	19 December 1908 (aged 27)	Middlesbrough	1932	
FW	Idris Hopkins	(Wales)	11 October 1910 (aged 25)	Crystal Palace	1932	
FW	David McCulloch	(Scotland)	5 October 1912 (aged 23)	Heart of Midlothian	1935	
FW	Ernest Muttitt	(England)	24 July 1908 (aged 28)	Middlesbrough	1932	
FW	Bobby Reid	(Scotland)	19 February 1911 (aged 25)	Hamilton Academical	1936	
FW	Billy Scott	(England)	6 December 1907 (aged 28)	Middlesbrough	1932	
FW	Les Smith	(England)	13 March 1918 (aged 18)	Petersham	1934	
Players who left the club mid-season
HB	Dai Richards	(Wales)	31 October 1906 (aged 29)	Wolverhampton Wanderers	1935	Transferred to Birmingham
HB	Cecil Smith	(England)	16 June 1907 (aged 29)	Brentford Market	1931	Transferred to Doncaster Rovers

- Sources: 100 Years of Brentford, Timeless Bees, Football League Players' Records 1888 to 1939

== Coaching staff ==
Name	Role
(England) Harry Curtis	Manager
(Scotland) Jimmy Bain	Assistant Manager
(England) Bob Kane	Trainer
(England) Jack Cartmell	Assistant Trainer
(England) Fred Keatch	Secretary

== Statistics ==
=== Appearances and goals ===

Brentford's highest appearance-makers in each position during the Football League season.

Pos	Nat	Name	League		FA Cup		Total	
Pos	Nat	Name	Apps	Goals	Apps	Goals	Apps	Goals
GK	(Scotland)	James Mathieson	35	0	2	0	37	0
GK	(England)	James Nicholls	7	0	0	0	7	0
DF	(England)	Arthur Bateman	26	0	2	0	28	0
DF	(England)	George Dumbrell	4	0	0	0	4	0
DF	(England)	Walter Metcalf	5	0	0	0	5	0
DF	(England)	George Poyser	31	0	2	0	33	0
DF	(England)	Joe Wilson	13	0	2	0	15	0
HB	(England)	Buster Brown	10	0	—		10	0
HB	(England)	Joe James	42	0	2	0	44	0
HB	(Scotland)	Duncan McKenzie	42	5	2	0	44	5
HB	(Scotland)	Joe Murray	1	0	0	0	1	0
HB	(Wales)	Dai Richards	29	0	2	0	31	0
HB	(England)	Cecil Smith	1	0	—		1	0
HB	(Scotland)	Archie Scott	2	0	0	0	2	0
FW	(Scotland)	Billy Dunn	1	0	0	0	1	0
FW	(England)	Jack Holliday	41	8	2	1	43	9
FW	(Wales)	Idris Hopkins	41	6	2	0	43	6
FW	(Scotland)	David McCulloch	41	31	2	2	43	33
FW	(England)	Ernest Muttitt	7	1	0	0	7	1
FW	(Scotland)	Bobby Reid	28	10	2	2	30	12
FW	(England)	Billy Scott	41	15	2	0	43	15
FW	(England)	Les Smith	14	2	0	0	14	2

- Players listed in italics left the club mid-season.
- Source: 100 Years of Brentford

=== Goalscorers ===
Pos.	Nat	Player	FL1	FAC	Total
FW	(Scotland)	David McCulloch	31	2	33
FW	(England)	Billy Scott	15	0	15
FW	(Scotland)	Bobby Reid	10	2	12
FW	(England)	Jack Holliday	8	1	9
FW	(Wales)	Idris Hopkins	6	0	6
HB	(Scotland)	Duncan McKenzie	5	0	5
FW	(England)	Les Smith	2	0	2
FW	(England)	Ernest Muttitt	1	0	1
Opponents			2	0	2
Total			82	5	87

- Players listed in italics left the club mid-season.
- Source: 100 Years of Brentford

=== International caps ===
Pos.	Nat	Player	Caps	Goals	Ref
FW	(Wales)	Idris Hopkins	3	0	
FW	(Scotland)	David McCulloch	2	1	
FW	(Wales)	Dai Richards	2	0	
FW	(England)	Billy Scott	1	0	

=== Management ===
Name	Nat	From	To	Record All Comps					Record League				
Name	Nat	From	To	P	W	D	L	W %	P	W	D	L	W %
Harry Curtis	(England)	29 August 1936	2 May 1937	44	19	10	15	43.18|	42	18	10	14	42.86

=== Summary ===
Games played	44 (42 First Division, 2 FA Cup)
Games won	19 (18 First Division, 1 FA Cup)
Games drawn	10 (10 First Division, 0 FA Cup)
Games lost	15 (14 First Division, 1 FA Cup)
Goals scored	87 (82 First Division, 5 FA Cup)
Goals conceded	81 (78 First Division, 3 FA Cup)
Clean sheets	6 (5 First Division, 1 FA Cup)
Biggest league win	4–0 on two occasions; 6–2 versus Derby County, 6 February 1937
Worst league defeat	4–0 on two occasions; 6–2 versus Manchester City, 3 April 1937; 5–1 versus Stoke City, 24 April 1937
Most appearances	44, Joe James, Duncan McKenzie (42 First Division, 2 FA Cup)
Top scorer (league)	31, David McCulloch
Top scorer (all competitions)	33, David McCulloch

== Transfers & loans ==
Cricketers are not included in this list.

Players transferred in
Date	Pos.	Name	Previous club	Fee	Ref.
September 1936	FW	(England) Bert Knott	(England) Arsenal	n/a	
1936	DF	(England) Harry Bamford	(England) Hayes	Free	
1936	HB	(Scotland) Joe Murray	(Scotland) Ayr United	Free	
March 1937	HB	(England) Buster Brown	(England) Huddersfield Town	£3,000	
Players transferred out
Date	Pos.	Name	Subsequent club	Fee	Ref.
November 1936	HB	(England) Cecil Smith	(England) Doncaster Rovers	Free	
January 1937	GK	(Wales) Thomas Lynch	(England) Watford	Undisclosed	
March 1937	HB	(Wales) Dai Richards	(England) Birmingham	£3,500	
Players released
Date	Pos.	Name	Subsequent club	Join date	Ref.
n/a	FW	(England) Bert Knott	(England) Stourbridge	n/a	
May 1937	FW	(Scotland) Billy Dunn	(England) Southampton	May 1937	
May 1937	DF	(England) Walter Metcalf	(England) Coventry City	1937	
May 1937	GK	(England) James Nicholls	(England) Port Vale	June 1937	
