= Ernest Muttitt =

English footballer

Personal information
- Full name: Ernest Muttitt
- Date of birth: 24 July 1908
- Place of birth: Middlesbrough, England
- Date of death: 8 August 1996 (aged 88)
- Place of death: Brentford, England
- Height: 5 ft 7 in (1.70 m)
- Position: Utility player

Senior career*
Years	Team	Apps	(Gls)
–1929	South Bank		
1929–1932	Middlesbrough	20	(3)
1932–1947	Brentford	92	(25)
1946	→ Colchester United (loan)	1	(0)
- Dover
- Dartford
- * Club domestic league appearances and goals

Ernest Muttitt (24 July 1908 – 8 August 1996) was an English professional footballer who played in the Football League for Brentford and Middlesbrough. He was posthumously inducted into the Brentford Hall of Fame in 2015. A utility player, Muttitt was nicknamed "Bulldog".

== Club career ==
=== Middlesbrough ===
An outside left, Muttitt began his career in his native north east with Northern League club South Bank, before transferring to newly promoted First Division club Middlesbrough in April 1929. Muttitt had to wait until 27 November 1929 to make his debut and scored the winner in a 2–1 victory over Arsenal. He managed 14 appearances and three goals during the 1929–30 season as Middlesbrough consolidated their position with a mid-table finish. Muttitt found first team chances harder to come by in the following two seasons and departed Ayresome Park at the end of the 1931–32 season. Muttitt made 25 appearances and scored four goals during his three years with Middlesbrough.

=== Brentford ===
During the 1932 off-season, Muttitt joined Third Division South club Brentford as part of a four-way transfer, with former Middlesbrough teammates Jack Holliday, Billy Scott and Herbert Watson all arriving at Griffin Park. Muttitt made 14 appearances and scored four goals during his first season with the Bees, in which the club finished as Third Division South champions. Muttitt broke into the team during the 1933–34 season, making 40 appearances and scoring 12 goals as Brentford finished fourth in the club's first season in the second tier. 1934–35 was a mixed season for Muttitt, making only 14 appearances, but scoring seven goals and winning a Second Division championship medal. He spent much of the season in the reserve team and contributed to its London Challenge Cup triumph.

With Brentford now in the First Division for the first time in the club's history, Muttitt spent long periods out of the team. He made just 13 appearances between August 1935 and May 1937 and then spent nearly two years in the reserve team. He returned to first team action in February 1939 and made 13 appearances in what remained of the 1938–39 season. The outbreak of the Second World War in 1939 and the suspension of competitive football brought Muttitt's professional career to a halt, but he remained with Brentford throughout the war, making 100 further appearances and guesting for eight different teams. He was used as a utility player during this period and was deployed in forward and defensive roles.

Muttitt joined Southern League club Colchester United on loan towards the end of the 1945–46 season, where he linked up with former Brentford teammate Roddy Munro. He made one appearance, in a 5–2 victory over Guildford City. Muttitt remained with the Brentford until 1947 and left Griffin Park after having made 94 competitive appearances and scored 25 goals for the club. He was posthumously inducted into the Brentford Hall of Fame in 2015.

=== Later years ===
Muttitt signed for Kent League First Division club Dover in 1947, who were managed at the time by his former Brentford teammate George Poyser. He ended his career with a spell at Southern League club Dartford.

== Personal life ==
Muttitt was married with two children. In 1942, Muttitt moved into a house on Braemar Road (opposite Brentford's Griffin Park ground) and in later years was a regular spectator at matches. He was a member of the Special Police Force during the Second World War. In March 2018, Muttitt's son Robert and his family were chosen by Brentford to break ground at the Brentford Community Stadium.

== Career statistics ==
Appearances and goals by club, season and competition
Club	Season	League			FA Cup		Other		Total	
Club	Season	Division	Apps	Goals	Apps	Goals	Apps	Goals	Apps	Goals
Middlesbrough	1929–30	First Division	10	2	4	1	―		14	3
Middlesbrough	1930–31	First Division	5	1	1	0	―		6	1
Middlesbrough	1931–32	First Division	5	0	0	0	―		5	0
Middlesbrough	Total		20	3	5	1	―		25	4
Brentford	1932–33	Third Division South	14	4	0	0	―		14	4
Brentford	1933–34	Second Division	39	12	1	0	―		40	12
Brentford	1934–35	Second Division	14	7	0	0	―		14	7
Brentford	1935–36	First Division	5	1	1	0	―		6	1
Brentford	1936–37	First Division	7	1	0	0	―		7	1
Brentford	1938–39	First Division	13	0	0	0	―		13	0
Brentford	Total		92	25	2	0	―		94	25
Colchester United (loan)	1945–46	Southern League	0	0	―		1 (Note: Appearance in Southern League Cup)	0	1	0
Career total			112	28	7	1	1	0	120	29

== Honours ==
Brentford

- Football League Second Division: 1933–34
- Football League Third Division South: 1932–33
- London Challenge Cup: 1934–35

Individual

- Brentford Hall of Fame
