= George Robson (footballer, born 1905) =

English footballer and scout

Personal information
- Full name: George Chippendale Robson
- Date of birth: 17 June 1905
- Place of birth: Newcastle upon Tyne, England
- Date of death: 1982 (aged 76–77)
- Position: Inside right

Youth career
- St Peter's Albion

Senior career*
Years	Team	Apps	(Gls)
1925–1928	Newcastle United	0	(0)
1928–1931	West Ham United	17	(2)
1931–1935	Brentford	124	(33)
1935–1940	Heart of Midlothian	115	(5)
- * Club domestic league appearances and goals

George Chippendale Robson (17 June 1905 – 1982) was an English professional footballer who played as an inside right, most notably for Brentford and Heart of Midlothian in the 1930s. He later became a scout at former club West Ham United.

== Playing career ==
=== Newcastle United ===
An inside right, Robson joined hometown First Division club Newcastle United in 1925, but failed to make an appearance for the first team before departing in 1928.

=== West Ham United ===
Robson signed for First Division club West Ham United in 1928. He made his debut for the Hammers on the final day of the 1927–28 season in a 3–1 defeat to former club Newcastle United. Robson had to wait until 15 December 1928 for his next appearance, but he made his presence count with West Ham's third goal in a 3–3 draw with Sunderland. That month, Robson also fired in five goals for the reserve team in a 13–2 drubbing of Fulham. On 18 May 1929, Robson scored a hat-trick against Dutch club Ajax in a 6–0 win at the Het Houten Stadion. Robson failed to make a breakthrough into the first team at Upton Park, his best seasonal appearance tally being 11 in the 1929–30 season. He departed West Ham in February 1931, having made 18 appearances and scored two goals.

=== Brentford ===
Robson moved from East to West London to sign for Third Division South club Brentford in February 1931. He was a regular in the team throughout his time at Griffin Park, averaging a goal in every four league games, with manager Harry Curtis offering the view that Robson was his best ever signing. Robson contributed to the Bees' elevation to the First Division for the first time in the club's history, helping the club to the Third Division South title in 1933 and scoring 10 goals in 27 games to send the club to the top flight as Second Division champions in 1935. That same year, he also won the London Challenge Cup with the reserve team. Once in the First Division, the signings of Dai Richards and Dave McCulloch pushed Robson out of the starting line-up and he made just 18 appearances during the first half of the 1935–36 season, before departing in the Bees December 1935. Robson made 131 appearances and scored 34 goals during his time at Brentford.

=== Heart of Midlothian ===
Robson moved to Scotland to join Scottish First Division club Heart of Midlothian in December 1935 and effectively replaced one of the men who displaced him at Brentford, Dave McCulloch. He made his debut in a 3–0 victory over Dundee on 2 January 1936. Along with Freddie Warren, Robson was the team's leading appearance-maker in the 1936–37 season, making 41 appearances and scoring four goals as Hearts finished fifth. He made 32 appearances and scored one goal during the 1937–38 season, a campaign in which Hearts finished as runners-up to Celtic in the First Division. He also appeared against former club Brentford in the Empire Exhibition Trophy. After the break-out of the Second World War in 1939 and the suspension of competitive football, Robson continued to appear for the club in the wartime Southern League. He made his final appearance for Hearts in a 4–1 Southern League win over Dumbarton on 9 November 1940. Robson made 163 appearances and scored seven goals during his five years at Tynecastle. He won a host of minor honours while with the club, including the Wilson Cup (three times), the East of Scotland Shield (twice), the Stirling Charity Cup and the Rosebery Charity Cup.

== Scouting career ==
After retiring as a player, Robson returned to former club West Ham United as a scout. He left Upton Park for the final time in 1971.

== Personal life ==
Prior to becoming a professional footballer, Robson worked as a lorry driver.

== Career statistics ==
Appearances and goals by club, season and competition
Club	Season	League			National cup (Note: Includes FA Cup, Scottish Cup)		Total	
Club	Season	Division	Apps	Goals	Apps	Goals	Apps	Goals
West Ham United	1927–28	First Division	1	0	0	0	1	0
West Ham United	1928–29	First Division	5	1	0	0	5	1
West Ham United	1929–30	First Division	10	1	1	0	11	1
West Ham United	1930–31	First Division	1	0	0	0	1	0
West Ham United	Total		17	2	1	0	18	2
Brentford	1930–31	Third Division South	13	5	—		13	5
Brentford	1931–32	Third Division South	38	9	5	1	43	10
Brentford	1932–33	Third Division South	24	6	1	0	25	6
Brentford	1933–34	Second Division	4	0	0	0	4	0
Brentford	1934–35	Second Division	27	10	1	0	28	10
Brentford	1935–36	First Division	18	3	—		18	3
Brentford	Total		124	33	7	1	131	34
Heart of Midlothian	1935–36	Scottish First Division	13	1	0	0	13	1
Heart of Midlothian	1936–37	Scottish First Division	38	3	3	0	41	3
Heart of Midlothian	1937–38	Scottish First Division	31	1	1	0	32	1
Heart of Midlothian	1938–39	Scottish First Division	33	0	4	0	37	0
Heart of Midlothian	Total		115	5	8	0	123	5
Career total			256	40	16	1	272	41

== Honours ==
Brentford

- Football League Second Division: 1934–35
- Football League Third Division South: 1932–33
- London Challenge Cup: 1934–35

Heart of Midlothian

- Wilson Cup: 1936–37, 1939–40, 1940–41
- East of Scotland Shield: 1936–37, 1937–38
- Stirling Charity Cup: 1936–37
- Rosebery Charity Cup: 1936–37
