= Jack Astley =

English footballer

Personal information
- Full name: John Astley
- Date of birth: 3 December 1909
- Place of birth: Warrington, England
- Date of death: 8 November 1984 (aged 74)
- Place of death: Whitley, England
- Height: 5 ft 9 1/2 in (1.77 m)
- Position: Right back

Youth career
- St. Elfin's Parish Church
- Chadwick Recreation
- Warrington Bedouins
- Elmwood Avenue Methodists

Senior career*
Years	Team	Apps	(Gls)
1930–1933	Southport	2	(0)
1932–1933	→ Shelbourne (loan)		
1933–1936	Brentford	49	(0)
1936–1942	Coventry City	140	(0)

International career
- League of Ireland XI
- * Club domestic league appearances and goals

John Astley (3 December 1909 – 8 November 1984) was an English professional footballer who played in the Football League for Southport, Brentford and Coventry City as a right back.

== Club career ==
=== Early years ===
A right back, Astley began his career in his native north west, playing for a number of amateur clubs before joining Third Division North club Southport in 1930. He made just two appearances for the club before joining League of Ireland club Shelbourne on loan for the 1932–33 season. He left Southport at the end of the 1932–33 season.

=== Brentford ===
Astley transferred to Second Division club Brentford in May 1933. He went straight into the team and made 41 appearances during the 1933–34 season, in which the Bees finished fourth in the Second Division. The arrival of full backs Arthur Bateman and George Poyser during the 1934 off-season and an injury saw Astley lose his place in the team and he made just one appearance during the 1934–35 season, in which Brentford secured promotion to the First Division as champions. He instead played for the reserves and won the 1935 London Challenge Cup with the team. Astley managed to make eight appearances in the First Division during the first half of the 1935–36 season, before departing Griffin Park in February 1936. Astley made 50 appearances for Brentford.

=== Coventry City ===
Astley joined Third Division South high-flyers Coventry City in February 1936. He made 14 appearances in what remained of the 1935–36 season and helped the Sky Blues to the Third Division South title. Astley displaced Vic Brown from the team and with former Brentford teammate Walter Metcalf on the other flank at full back, he was an ever-present until professional football was suspended in 1939 upon to the outbreak of the Second World War. He made 148 appearances for the Sky Blues and guested for Nottingham Forest during the war.

== Representative career ==
While with Shelbourne, Astley played for the League of Ireland representative team against their Welsh League counterparts.

== Personal life ==
Astley served in the British Army during and after the Second World War and rose to the rank of captain. He married his wife, an Estonian, during 5 1/2-years stationed in Germany. Astley settled in Coventry in 1950 and began working for the General Electric Company, retiring in 1974. He died of a heart attack in Whitley Hospital in November 1984.

== Career statistics ==
Appearances and goals by club, season and competition
Club	Season	League			FA Cup		Total	
Club	Season	Division	Apps	Goals	Apps	Goals	Apps	Goals
Southport	1931–32	Third Division North	2	0	0	0	2	0
Brentford	1933–34	Second Division	40	0	1	0	41	0
Brentford	1934–35	Second Division	1	0	0	0	1	0
Brentford	1935–36	First Division	8	0	—		8	0
Brentford	Total		49	0	1	0	50	0
Coventry City	1935–36	Third Division South	14	0	3	0	17	0
Coventry City	1936–37	Second Division	42	0	3	0	45	0
Coventry City	1937–38	Second Division	42	0	1	0	43	0
Coventry City	1938–39	Second Division	42	0	1	0	43	0
Coventry City	Total		140	0	8	0	148	0
Career total			191	0	9	0	200	0

== Honours ==
Brentford Reserves

- London Challenge Cup: 1934–35

Coventry City

- Football League Third Division South: 1935–36
