= Brentford F.C. Hall of Fame =

Hall of Fame of Brentford Football Club

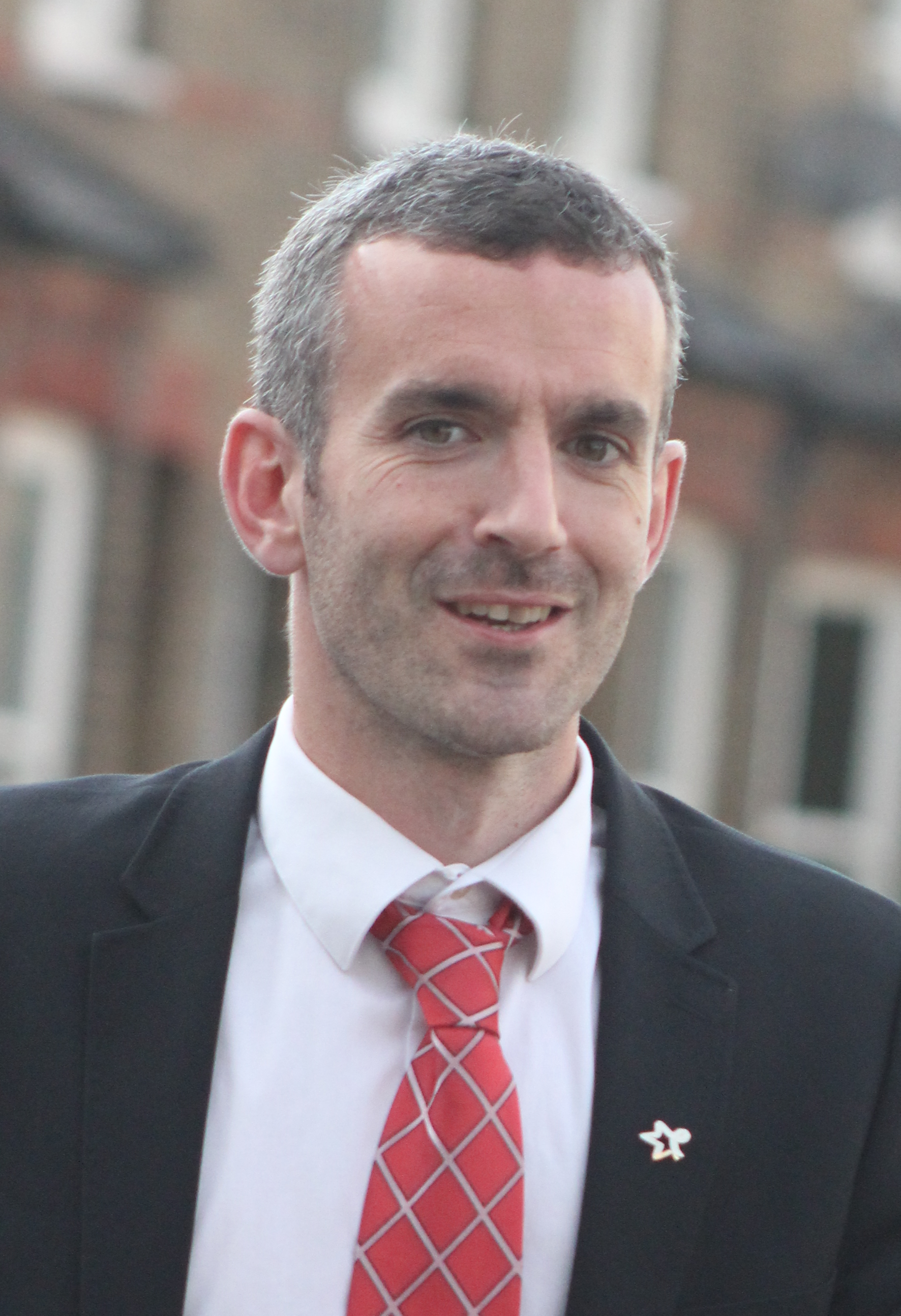
Kevin O'Connor was the first person to be inducted into the Brentford Hall of Fame while a member of the club's staff.

Brentford Football Club is an English professional football club based in Brentford, London. Between 1897 and 1920, the first team competed in the London League, Southern League and Western League. Since 1920, the first team has competed in the Football League, the Premier League and other nationally and internationally organised competitions. All players who have been inducted into the club's Hall of Fame are listed below.

The Brentford Hall of Fame was founded in 1991 and the inaugural inductions were former players Idris Hopkins, Joe James and former player and manager Malky MacDonald. 10 former players and staff members were the most recent inductees in November 2024 and the total number of inductees is 69. The Hall of Fame is administered jointly by the club and the Brentford F.C. Former Players’ Association.

== Key ==
- Appearance and goal totals include matches in the Football League, Southern League, FA Cup, League Cup, Football League Trophy, Anglo-Italian Cup, London Challenge Cup, Southern Floodlit Challenge Cup, Football League Jubilee Fund and Empire Exhibition Cup. Substitute appearances are included. Wartime matches are regarded as unofficial and are excluded.
- "Playing years" corresponds to the years in which the player made their first and last competitive first team appearances.
- "Staff years" corresponds to the years in which the player began and finished their staff role.
- Players listed in **bold** won full international caps whilst with the club.
- Statistics are correct as of match played 5 October 2025.

=== Playing positions ===
GK	Goalkeeper	RB	Right back	RW	Right winger	DF	Defender	HB	Half back	IF	Inside forward	DM	Defensive midfielder
OL	Outside left	LB	Left back	LW	Left winger	CB	Centre back	FW	Forward	FB	Full back	RM	Right midfielder
W	Winger	MF	Midfielder	ST	Striker	WH	Wing half	AM	Attacking midfielder	CM	Central midfielder	LM	Left midfielder
U	Utility player	OR	Outside right	SW	Sweeper	LH	Left half	RH	Right half				

Symbol	Meaning
‡	Brentford men's or women's player or staff member in the 2025–26 season.
(c)	Player captained the club.
♠	Player holds a club record.

== List of members ==
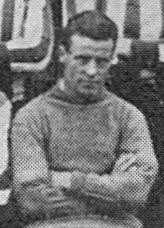
In two spells, Jack Cartmell served Brentford as a player and trainer for 31 years.

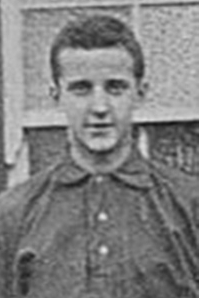
1890s half back Arthur Charlton was described as "probably the club's first great player".

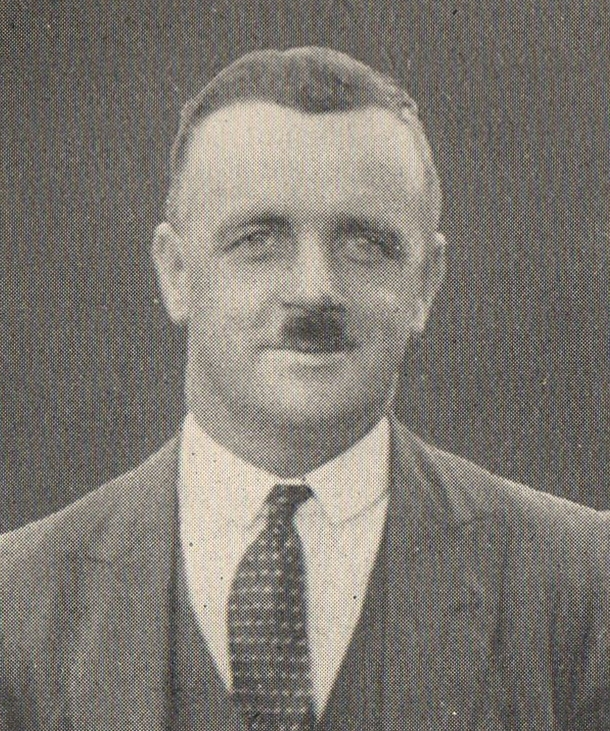
Harry Curtis is Brentford's longest-serving and most successful manager, masterminding promotions from the Third Division South to the First Division between 1933 and 1935.

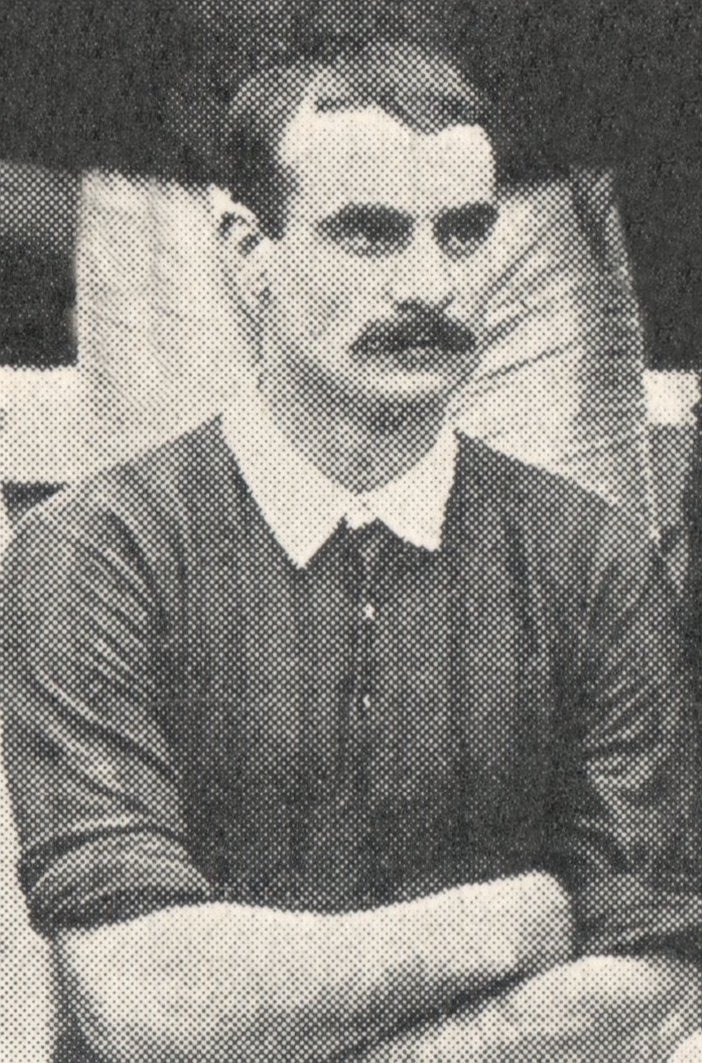
Wing half Jimmy Jay made more Southern League appearances for Brentford than any other player.

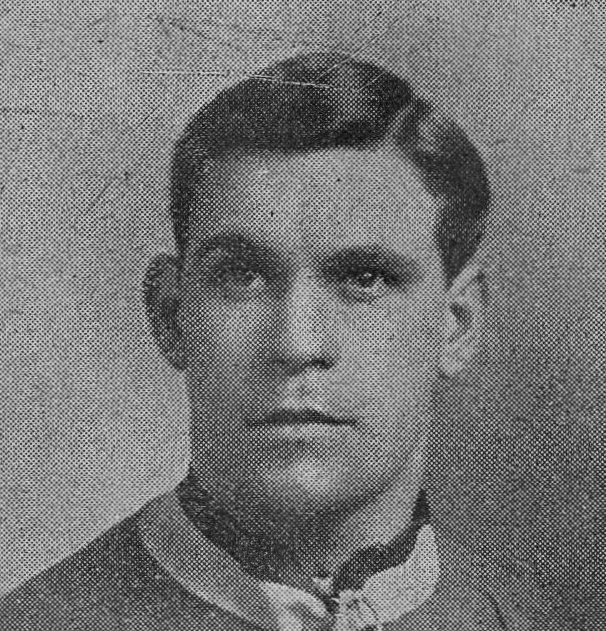
Outside left Patsy Hendren made 308 appearances in two spells between 1907 and 1927.

Name	Nationality	Player				Staff		Inducted	Major honour(s)	Notes	Ref
Name	Nationality	Position(s)	Years	Apps	Goals	Position(s)	Years	Inducted	Major honour(s)	Notes	Ref
Jimmy Bain (c)	Scotland	FB	1928–1933	201	2	Manager, assistant manager	1934–1956	2015	1932–33 Third Division South champion		
Arthur Bateman (c)	England	FB	1934–1938	153	1	—	—	2015	1934–35 Second Division champion		
Paul Bence (c)	England	MF	1970–1977	268	6	—	—	2019	1971–72 Fourth Division promotion		
Gary Blissett	England	FW	1987–1993	291	105	—	—	2015	1991–92 Third Division champion		
Frank Blunstone	England	—	—	—	—	Manager, assistant manager	1969–1973; 1984	2024	1971–72 Fourth Division promotion		
Bob Booker	England	MF	1978–1988; 1991–1993	322	48	Youth team manager	1994–2000	2014	1991–92 Third Division champion		
Wally Bragg	England	CH	1947–1957	168	6	—	—	2018	—		
George Bristow	England	WH	1950–1961	264	8	—	—	2015	—		
Chic Brodie	Scotland	GK	1963–1971	224	0	—	—	2015	—		
Gerry Cakebread	England	GK	1954–1964	374	0	—	—	2015	1962–63 Fourth Division champion		
Jack Cartmell	England	OL	1919–1921	66	2	Trainer, assistant trainer	1926–1955	2015	—		
Arthur Charlton	England	HB	1892–1898	68	13	—	—	2015	—		
Ken Coote ♠ (c)	England	FB	1949–1964	559 ♠	14	—	—	n/a	1962–63 Fourth Division champion		
Amy Crook ‡	England	n/a	1990–2010	480	300	Community Sports Trust administration, Brentford Women general manager and community executive	2010–	2024	—		
Roger Cross	England	FW	1970–1971; 1973–1977	228	61	—	—	2018	—		
Joe Crozier	Scotland	GK	1937–1949	223	0	—	—	2019	—		
Harry Curtis	England	—	—	—	—	Manager	1926–1949	2015	1932–33 Third Division South and 1934–35 Second Division champion		
Billy Dare	England	CF	1949–1955	222	68	—	—	2024	—		
Ian Dargie	England	CH/IR	1952–1962	281	2	—	—	2018	—		
John Docherty	Scotland	OR	1960–1961; 1966–1968; 1970–1974	252	79	Manager, assistant manager	1975–1976; 1984–1986	2024	—		
Terry Evans (c)	England	CB	1985–1993	285	30	—	—	2014	1991–92 Third Division champion		
George Francis	England	CF	1955–1961; 1961–1962	280	136	—	—	2014	—	(Note: Briefly signed for Queens Park Rangers between his two spells as a player.)	
Ted Gaskell	England	GK	1947–1952	38	0	A manager	1959–1961	2019	—		
Marcus Gayle ‡	Jamaica	FW	1988–1994; 2005–2006	230	28	Ambassador	—	2015	1991–92 Third Division champion	(Note: Capped by England at U17 level.)	
Peter Gelson	England	CB	1961–1974	516	18	—	—	2014	1962–63 Fourth Division champion		
Bill Gorman	Ireland; Republic of Ireland	FB	1938–1949	144	0	—	—	2015	—		
Jackie Graham	Scotland	MF	1970–1980	409	40	—	—	2013	1971–72 Fourth Division champion 1977–78 Fourth Division promotion		
Fred Halliday	England	—	—	—	—	Manager, administration	1908–1926	2015	—		
Alan Hawley (c)	England	RB	1962–1974	345	4	Youth team coach	1990s	2013	1971–72 Fourth Division promotion		
Patsy Hendren	England	FB	1908–1927	158	18	—	—	2015	—		
Tommy Higginson	Scotland	WH	1960–1970	435	16	—	—	2016	1962–63 Fourth Division champion		
Phil Holder	England	—	—	—	—	Manager, assistant manager	1987–1993	2012	1991–92 Third Division champion		
Dean Holdsworth	England	FW	1988; 1989–1992	145	76	—	—	2013	1991–92 Third Division champion	(Note: Joined on loan from Watford in October 1988 and returned to sign permanently in September 1989.)	
Jack Holliday	England	CF	1932–1939	222	121	Assistant trainer, youth team trainer	1944–1961	2015	1932–33 Third Division South and 1934–35 Second Division champion		
Idris Hopkins	Wales	OR	1932–1947	314	80	—	—	Inaugural	1932–33 Third Division South and 1934–35 Second Division champion		
Ken Horne	England	WH/FB	1950–1960	239	1	Youth team coach, scout	1970s	2015	—		
Terry Hurlock (c)	England	CM	1980–1986	265	24	—	—	2024	—		
Joe James (c)	England	CB	1931–1939	255	2	—	—	Inaugural	1932–33 Third Division South and 1934–35 Second Division champion		
Pontus Jansson (c)	Sweden	CB	2019–2023	115	4	—	—	2024	2021 Championship play-offs winner		
Jimmy Jay	England	WH	1903–1908; 1909–1910	322	8	—	—	2015	—		
Allan Jones	Wales	FB	1963–1970	281	3	—	—	2015	—		
Chris Kamara (c)	England	MF	1981–1985	189	32	—	—	2024	—		
Billy Lane	England	CF	1929–1932	123	89	Coach	1946–1947	2024	—		
Jack Lane (c)	England	IF	1925–1931	234	86	—	—	2015	—		
Malky MacDonald	Scotland	RB	1946–1949	93	1	Manager, coach, trainer	1957–1965	Inaugural	1962–63 Fourth Division champion		
Andrew McCulloch	England	FW	1976–1979	122	49	—	—	2018	1977–78 Fourth Division promotion		
David McCulloch	Scotland	CF	1935–1938	124	90	—	—	2015	—		
Duncan McKenzie	Scotland	WH	1932–1938	160	10	—	—	2024	1934–35 Second Division champion		
Keith Millen	England	CB	1984–1994	380	20	—	—	2014	1991–92 Third Division champion		
Fred Monk	England	RB	1948–1954	219	49	Trainer	1957–1965	2015	—		
Ernest Muttitt	England	U	1932–1939	94	25	Youth team manager	1955–1957	2015	1932–33 Third Division South and 1934–35 Second Division champion		
Alan Nelmes	England	CB	1967–1976	350	2	—	—	2014	1971–72 Fourth Division promotion		
Kevin O'Connor (c) ‡	Republic of Ireland	U	2000–2014	501	44	Assistant first team coach, B/Development Squad head coach, B/Development Squad assistant coach	2015–	2015	2008–09 League Two champion and 2013–14 League One promotion	(Note: Capped by Republic of Ireland at U21 level.)	
Lloyd Owusu	Ghana	FW	1998–2002; 2005–2007	250	87	—	—	2016	1998–99 Third Division champion		
Gordon Phillips	England	GK	1963–1973	227	0	Goalkeeping coach	1991–1992	2017	1971–72 Fourth Division promotion		
George Poyser	England	LB	1934–1946	158	0	Assistant trainer	1950–1951	2018	1934–35 Second Division champion		
Steve Phillips	England	IF	1977–1980	167	69	—	—	2019	1977–78 Fourth Division promotion		
Ted Price	England	GK	1912–1920	118	0	—	—	2019	—		
Johnny Rainford	England	IF	1953–1962	324	49	—	—	2015	—		
Dusty Rhodes	England	FB	1908–1915	221	2	Manager, trainer	1912–1919	2015	—		
Gary Roberts	Wales	W	1980–1986	226	64	—	—	2020	—		
Bobby Ross (c)	Scotland	IF	1966–1972	323	63	—	—	2013	1971–72 Fourth Division promotion		
Danis Salman	England	DF	1975–1985	371	8	—	—	2014	1977–78 Fourth Division promotion	(Note: Capped by England at U18 level.)	
Sam Saunders ‡	England	RM	2009–2016	206	30	B head coach, B assistant coach	2019–	2017	2013–14 League One promotion		
Andy Scott	England	FW	1997–2001	143	37	Manager, chief scout, head of recruitment	2007–2011; 2015–2017	2024	1998–99 Third Division champion (player) and 2008–09 League Two champion (manager)		
Billy Scott	England	IF	1932–1947	296	86	—	—	2015	1932–33 Third Division South and 1934–35 Second Division champion		
Les Smith	England	OL	1936–1939; 1952	78	7	—	—	2015	—		
Jim Towers ♠	England	FW	1954–1961	282	163 ♠	—	—	2015	—		
Tosher Underwood	England	OF	1902–1908	196	23	—	—	2015	—		
