= Harry Curtis (football manager) =

English footballer, referee and manager

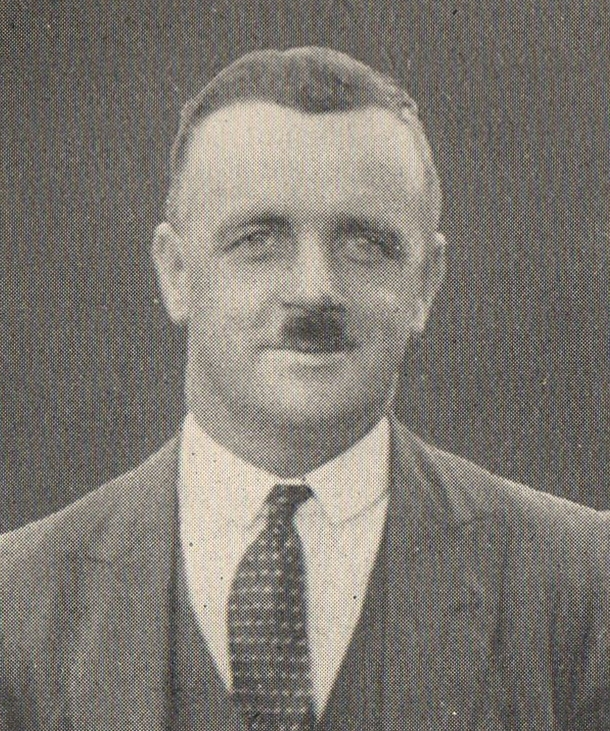
- Curtis pictured in 1926.

Personal information
- Full name: Henry Charles Curtis
- Date of birth: 22 January 1890
- Place of birth: Holloway, England
- Date of death: 30 January 1966 (aged 76)
- Place of death: Southend-on-Sea, England

Senior career*
Years	Team	Apps	(Gls)
- Romford
- Walthamstow Grange

Managerial career
- Gnome Athletic
- 1923–1926: Gillingham
- 1926–1949: Brentford
- 1950–1952: Tonbridge
- * Club domestic league appearances and goals

Henry Charles Curtis (22 January 1890 – 30 January 1966) was an English footballer, referee and manager, best-remembered for his 23 years as manager of Brentford. He is Brentford's longest-serving and most successful manager to date. In a 2013 Football League 125th anniversary poll, Curtis was voted Brentford's greatest-ever manager. He was posthumously inducted into the Brentford Hall of Fame in May 2015.

== Playing and refereeing career ==
Curtis' first involvement in football was as secretary of Shernall United and he later had brief spells as a player for Romford and Walthamstow Grange. After his retirement from playing, Curtis became a referee and was quickly added to the Southern League list of referees. He was subsequently promoted onto the London Combination list. In 1918, he was promoted to the Football League list and retired from refereeing in 1923.

== Managerial career ==
=== Gnome Athletic ===
Curtis began his managerial career as secretary-manager of amateur club Gnome Athletic.

=== Gillingham ===
Curtis entered league management when he became secretary-manager of Third Division South club Gillingham in May 1923. He had travelled to Priestfield to watch a match after missing his train to Swansea, where he was to have refereed a match at the Vetch Field that day. He enquired about the then-vacant manager's position and was offered the role. After leading Gillingham to three mid-table finishes, Curtis departed the club on 30 March 1926.

=== Brentford ===
==== Early years and rise to the First Division (1926–1935) ====
After a chance meeting with Brentford director and former referee Frank Barton, Curtis was appointed manager of the Third Division South club in April 1926 and signed a 12-month contract. He brought Gillingham trainer Bob Kane with him to Griffin Park. Curtis officially took up the role in May 1926 and his debut season saw a run to the fifth round of the FA Cup, which yielded enough money to build a grandstand on the Braemar Road side of Griffin Park. In the 1929–30 season, Curtis' Bees team won all 21 home league games, an outright English league record. Curtis also named the same team for 21 consecutive games between November 1929 and March 1930.

The most successful era in the club's history began in 1932–33 season, largely in part due to the signings of Jack Holliday, Ernest Muttitt, Billy Scott and Bert Watson from First Division club Middlesbrough. Brentford won the 1932–33 Third Division South title, which was the first silverware of Curtis' managerial career. Curtis' Brentford finished fourth in the club's first season in the Second Division, before winning a second promotion in three seasons with the 1934–35 Second Division title, which secured top-flight football for the first time in the club's history. The club won a second piece of silverware during the 1934–35 season – the London Challenge Cup.

==== First Division heyday and decline (1935–1949) ====
Curtis and recently appointed assistant manager Jimmy Bain guided Brentford to fifth and two successive sixth-place finishes in the club's first three seasons in the First Division. Crowds at Griffin Park averaged 25,000 and in the 1937–38 season and Brentford led the First Division table for three months and reached the sixth round of the FA Cup for the first time. Brentford's sustained period of success was consolidated by Curtis' man-management abilities and his astuteness in the transfer market, bringing in Scottish internationals Dave McCulloch, Bobby Reid and Duncan McKenzie, Welsh internationals Idris Hopkins and Les Boulter, with Billy Scott and Les Smith going on to represent England.

The outbreak of the Second World War and the suspension of professional football in 1939 brought Brentford's golden era to a halt, but Curtis still won further silverware during the war, winning the 1941–42 London War Cup. Football League competition resumed in 1946 and with an ageing squad, Curtis' Brentford were relegated to the Second Division at the end of the 1946–47 season. Curtis eventually stood down from the manager's role in February 1949. For his long service, Curtis was rewarded with a testimonial in May 1949, played between Brentford and a team of former players. To date, Curtis is Brentford's longest-serving and most successful manager and a lounge at Griffin Park was named in his honour. The boardroom at the Brentford Community Stadium is also named after him. In 2013, Curtis was voted Brentford's greatest-ever manager in a Football League 125th anniversary poll and he was posthumously inducted into the Brentford Hall of Fame in May 2015.

=== Tonbridge ===
In mid-January 1950, Curtis was appointed secretary-manager of Southern League club Tonbridge and commenced work on 1 February 1950. He won the 1951–52 Kent Senior Shield and guided the club to the first round proper of the 1950–51, 1951–52 and 1952–53 FA Cups. Interference from the club's board in team selection led to Curtis resigning his position on 5 November 1952, but he continued in the role until the end of the year.

== Personal life ==
Curtis was born in Holloway, London and moved to Walthamstow with his mother after his parents separated. He attended Maynard Road School in Walthamstow. In 1911, he was working as an engineer's clerk and after marrying in 1915, he had two sons. Curtis employed his son Gordon as his assistant while secretary-manager of Tonbridge Angels in the early 1950s. After retiring from football management, Curtis moved to Southend-on-Sea and worked as a personnel manager for a company in the town. He later worked as a journalist.

== Career statistics ==
Managerial record by team and tenure
Team	From	To	Record					Ref
Team	From	To	G	W	D	L	Win %	Ref
Gillingham	10 May 1923	30 March 1926	132	44	38	50	33.33	
Brentford	April 1926	February 1949	708	306	157	245	43.22	
Tonbridge	1 February 1950	31 December 1952	168	63	38	67	37.50	
Total			1,008	413	233	362	40.97	—

== Honours ==
Brentford

- Football League Second Division: 1934–35
- Football League Third Division South: 1932–33
- London Challenge Cup: 1934–35
- London War Cup: 1941–42

Tonbridge

- Kent Senior Shield: 1951–52

Individual

- Brentford Hall of Fame
- Football League Long Service Medal
