= Jackie Burns =

Jackie Burns may refer to:

- Jackie Burns (footballer, born 1906), English men's football inside forward
- Jackie Burns (actress) (born 1980), American actress and singer in musical theatre
- Jackie Burns (footballer, born 1997), Northern Irish women's football goalkeeper

== See also ==
- Jackie Burn (disambiguation)
