= Jackie Burns (footballer, born 1906) =

English footballer

Personal information
- Full name: John Charles Burns
- Date of birth: 27 November 1906
- Place of birth: London, England
- Date of death: 12 June 1986 (aged 79)
- Place of death: Stubbington, England
- Positions: Left half; inside forward

Youth career
- 1926–1927: Crypto

Senior career*
| Years | Team | Apps | (Gls) |
| 1927–1931 | Queens Park Rangers | 117 | (29) |
| 1931–1935 | Brentford | 145 | (14) |
| 1935–1937 | Leyton | | |
| 1937–1938 | Sutton United | | |
- London Caledonians

International career
| 1930–1935 | England Amateurs | 16 | (3) |
- * Club domestic league appearances and goals

John Charles Burns (27 November 1906 – 12 June 1986) was an English amateur footballer who played in the Football League for Queens Park Rangers and Brentford as a left half. He represented England Amateurs at international level and holds the record for Football League appearances by an amateur (262).

== Club career ==
Burns joined Third Division South club Queens Park Rangers in 1927 and made 125 appearances and scored 34 goals in a four-year spell. He joined fellow Third Division South club and West London rivals Brentford in 1931 at the beginning of the most successful period of the club's history, which began with Harry Curtis' team winning the Third Division South title in the 1932–33 season. The Second Division title and the London Senior Cup followed in the 1934–35 season, which sent the Brentford into the top-flight for the first time in the club's history. Burns left the club in December 1935, having made 152 appearances and scored 116 goals during his four years with the Bees. He joined Athenian League club Leyton and spent two years with the club and reached the final of the 1937 FA Amateur Cup. Burns spent the 1937–38 season with Athenian League club Sutton United and won the Surrey Charity Shield. He also appeared for Isthmian League club London Caledonians.

== Representative career ==
Burns made his first appearances for the touring club Middlesex Wanderers in 1929, appearing in matches against Stade Français Paris and a Paris XI. He returned to Paris in 1931 to take part in matches against Racing and Athletic de Paris. Burns appeared on two tours of the Netherlands with Wanderers in 1932, beating Vitesse Arnhem and PSV Eindhoven along the way. He also represented Corinthian.

== International career ==
Burns won his first England Amateurs cap in 1930 and made 16 appearances for the side throughout the 1930s, 9 of them as captain. He scored three goals.

== Personal life ==
Burns was schooled at the London Oratory School in Chelsea, London and trained as a teacher at St Mary's College, Twickenham from 1926 to 1928. After qualifying, he returned to teach at the London Oratory School. A former pupil described Burns as "a kind and generous man and an excellent teacher of mathematics". Burns was also an amateur boxer.

== Career statistics ==
Appearances and goals by club, season and competition
| Club | Season | League | | | FA Cup | | Total | |
| Club | Season | Division | Apps | Goals | Apps | Goals | Apps | Goals |
|---|---|---|---|---|---|---|---|---|
| Queens Park Rangers | 1927–28 | Third Division South | 16 | 5 | 0 | 0 | 16 | 5 |
| Queens Park Rangers | 1928–29 | Third Division South | 37 | 12 | 1 | 1 | 38 | 13 |
| Queens Park Rangers | 1929–30 | Third Division South | 31 | 2 | 4 | 2 | 35 | 4 |
| Queens Park Rangers | 1930–31 | Third Division South | 33 | 10 | 3 | 2 | 36 | 12 |
| Queens Park Rangers | Total | | 117 | 29 | 8 | 5 | 125 | 34 |
| Brentford | 1931–32 | Third Division South | 36 | 7 | 5 | 2 | 41 | 7 |
| Brentford | 1932–33 | Third Division South | 37 | 1 | 1 | 0 | 38 | 1 |
| Brentford | 1933–34 | Second Division | 35 | 0 | 1 | 0 | 36 | 0 |
| Brentford | 1934–35 | Second Division | 28 | 5 | 1 | 0 | 29 | 5 |
| Brentford | 1935–36 | First Division | 9 | 1 | — | | 9 | 1 |
| Brentford | Total | | 145 | 14 | 8 | 2 | 153 | 16 |
| Career total | | | 262 | 43 | 16 | 7 | 278 | 50 |

== Honours ==
Brentford

- Football League Second Division: 1934–35
- Football League Third Division South: 1932–33
- London Challenge Cup: 1934–35

Sutton United

- Surrey Charity Shield: 1937–38
