= 1934–35 Brentford F.C. season =

English football team season

Brentford
1934–35 season
- Chairman: Louis P. Simon
- Manager: Harry Curtis
- Stadium: Griffin Park
- Second Division: 1st (promoted)
- FA Cup: Third round
- London Challenge Cup: Winners
- Top goalscorer: League: Holliday (25); All: Holliday (25)
- Highest home attendance: 26,079
- Lowest home attendance: 11,843
- Average home league attendance: 18,062
Home colours

During the 1934–35 English football season, Brentford competed in the Football League Second Division. The Bees led the division for much of the second half of the season and were promoted as champions to the First Division for the first time in the club's history. Brentford also won the London Challenge Cup for the first time.

== Season summary ==
Brentford manager Harry Curtis made two big-money signings during the 1934 off-season – left back George Poyser from Port Vale for a club record £1,550 fee (equivalent to £95,900 in 2025) and centre half Archie Scott from Derby County for £1,000. Jim Brown was signed from Manchester United as outside right cover for Idris Hopkins and new first-choice goalkeeper James Mathieson was signed on a free transfer from Middlesbrough. After two years on the fringes, young right half Duncan McKenzie broke into the first team squad during the season and George Robson returned in attack, after being frozen out during the previous season. Former captain Jimmy Bain retired and became the club's assistant manager, a position he held until 1952.

Despite 1933–34's leading scorers Jack Holliday and Idris Hopkins finding the net with regularity, it was Ernest Muttitt who inspired the Bees to start the season with a seven-match unbeaten run. The run took the club to the top of the table, with Muttitt scoring seven goals in a five-match spell.

Aside from two separate spells of three defeats in five matches, Brentford went on two long unbeaten runs during the season. A 1–0 win over Notts County on 2 March 1934 returned the Bees to the top and they won promotion with three matches to spare. Three points from the final three matches confirmed Brentford as champions, five points above nearest challengers Bolton Wanderers and West Ham United. The promotion meant that Brentford would play in the First Division for the first time in the club's history and the championship shield was held aloft by captain Herbert Watson after the final match of the season at Griffin Park. A unique double was achieved with Brentford's first-ever victory in the London Challenge Cup, in which Millwall were beaten 2–1 after extra time in the final at Craven Cottage.

A number of Football League club records were set or equalled during the season, including:

- Least home defeats (0, equalling the 1929–30 team's unbeaten home record)
- Most consecutive home matches undefeated (24, a run which stretched back to April 1934)
- The club record for highest winning margin in a Football League match was broken twice during the season, firstly in a 8–1 victory over Barnsley in December 1934 and then in the 8–0 hammering of Port Vale in April 1935. The eight-goal winning margin stood as the club record until October 1963.

Billy Scott became the club's second Football League-era player to score five goals in a match, with five goals in the 8–1 win over Barnsley. He scored a hat-trick in the return match on 27 April 1935. With his hat-trick versus Port Vale on 20 April 1935, Jack Holliday set a club record of 9 hat-tricks.

== League table ==
| Pos | Team | Pld | W | D | L | GF | GA | GAv | Pts | Promotion or relegation |
|---|---|---|---|---|---|---|---|---|---|---|
| 1 | Brentford (C, P) | 42 | 26 | 9 | 7 | 93 | 48 | 1.938 | 61 | Promotion to the First Division |
| 2 | Bolton Wanderers (P) | 42 | 26 | 4 | 12 | 96 | 48 | 2.000 | 56 | Promotion to the First Division |
| 3 | West Ham United | 42 | 26 | 4 | 12 | 80 | 63 | 1.270 | 56 | |
| 4 | Blackpool | 42 | 21 | 11 | 10 | 79 | 57 | 1.386 | 53 | |
| 5 | Manchester United | 42 | 23 | 4 | 15 | 76 | 55 | 1.382 | 50 | |

Rules for classification: 1) Points; 2) Goal average; 3) Goals scored
(C) Champions; (P) Promoted

== Results ==
Brentford's goal tally listed first.

=== Legend ===
| Win | Draw | Loss |

=== Football League Second Division ===
| No. | Date | Opponent | Venue | Result | Attendance | Scorer(s) |
|---|---|---|---|---|---|---|
| 1 | 25 August 1934 | Norwich City | H | 2–1 | 21,565 | Holliday, Hopkins |
| 2 | 27 August 1934 | Fulham | A | 2–2 | 26,656 | Fletcher, Holliday (pen) |
| 3 | 1 September 1934 | Newcastle United | A | 5–2 | 23,714 | Muttitt (3), Holliday, Hopkins |
| 4 | 5 September 1934 | Fulham | H | 1–0 | 23,678 | Muttitt |
| 5 | 8 September 1934 | West Ham United | H | 4–1 | 20,818 | Holliday (3), Burns |
| 6 | 15 September 1934 | Blackpool | A | 2–2 | 24,223 | Muttitt, Scott |
| 7 | 22 September 1934 | Bury | H | 2–1 | 13,729 | Muttitt (2) |
| 8 | 29 September 1934 | Hull City | A | 1–2 | 7,764 | Fletcher |
| 9 | 6 October 1934 | Nottingham Forest | H | 1–1 | 16,098 | James |
| 10 | 13 October 1934 | Bradford City | A | 0–3 | 13,132 | |
| 11 | 20 October 1934 | Notts County | H | 4–1 | 15,313 | Burns, Mills (og) |
| 12 | 27 October 1934 | Southampton | A | 0–1 | 10,268 | |
| 13 | 3 November 1934 | Bolton Wanderers | H | 1–0 | 22,322 | Holliday |
| 14 | 10 November 1934 | Oldham Athletic | A | 3–1 | 8,391 | Robson, Fletcher, Scott |
| 15 | 17 November 1934 | Burnley | H | 6–1 | 15,459 | Holliday (3), Robson, Hopkins, Scott |
| 16 | 24 November 1934 | Swansea Town | A | 4–2 | 10,547 | Scott (2), Holliday (2) |
| 17 | 1 December 1934 | Manchester United | H | 3–1 | 21,744 | Hopkins, Fletcher, Holliday |
| 18 | 8 December 1934 | Port Vale | A | 2–2 | 8,054 | Hopkins, Robson (pen) |
| 19 | 15 December 1934 | Barnsley | H | 8–1 | 11,843 | Scott (5), Robson (2), Holliday |
| 20 | 22 December 1934 | Sheffield United | A | 2–1 | 11,115 | Fletcher, Hopkins |
| 21 | 25 December 1934 | Plymouth Argyle | H | 0–0 | 23,786 | |
| 22 | 26 December 1934 | Plymouth Argyle | A | 1–1 | 32,509 | Scott |
| 23 | 29 December 1934 | Norwich City | A | 1–2 | 13,371 | Hopkins |
| 24 | 5 January 1935 | Newcastle United | H | 3–0 | 26,079 | Hopkins, Fletcher (2) |
| 25 | 19 January 1935 | West Ham United | A | 0–2 | 33,788 | |
| 26 | 26 January 1935 | Blackpool | H | 2–1 | 13,087 | Holliday, Robson |
| 27 | 2 February 1935 | Bury | A | 1–4 | 13,687 | Hopkins |
| 28 | 9 February 1935 | Hull City | H | 2–1 | 14,109 | Hopkins, Holliday |
| 29 | 23 February 1935 | Bradford City | H | 2–0 | 15,824 | Fletcher, Hopkins |
| 30 | 28 February 1935 | Nottingham Forest | A | 0–0 | 8,137 | |
| 31 | 2 March 1935 | Notts County | A | 1–0 | 10,252 | Holliday |
| 32 | 9 March 1935 | Southampton | H | 3–2 | 13,111 | Hopkins, Scott (2) |
| 33 | 23 March 1935 | Oldham Athletic | H | 2–1 | 13,867 | Holliday (2) |
| 34 | 30 March 1935 | Burnley | A | 3–0 | 11,206 | Robson, Scott, Hopkins |
| 35 | 6 April 1935 | Swansea Town | H | 1–0 | 17,212 | Holliday |
| 36 | 13 April 1935 | Manchester United | A | 0–0 | 32,969 | |
| 37 | 19 April 1935 | Bradford Park Avenue | H | 1–0 | 20,447 | Holliday |
| 38 | 20 April 1935 | Port Vale | H | 8–0 | 18,194 | Holliday (3), Robson (3), Burns, Hopkins |
| 39 | 22 April 1935 | Bradford Park Avenue | A | 3–2 | 12,729 | Bateman, Hopkins (2) |
| 40 | 27 April 1935 | Barnsley | A | 3–3 | 7,021 | Scott (3) |
| 41 | 1 May 1935 | Bolton Wanderers | A | 0–2 | 46,554 | |
| 42 | 4 May 1935 | Sheffield United | H | 3–1 | 21,017 | Fletcher, Holliday, Scott (3) |

=== FA Cup ===
| Round | Date | Opponent | Venue | Attendance | Result |
|---|---|---|---|---|---|
| 3R | 11 January 1935 | Plymouth Argyle | H | 24,500 | 0–1 |

- Sources: Statto, 11v11, 100 Years of Brentford

== Playing squad ==
Players' ages are as of the opening day of the 1934–35 season.

| Pos. | Name | Nat. | Date of birth (age) | Signed from | Signed in | Notes |
Goalkeepers
| GK | James Mathieson | (Scotland) | 10 May 1904 (aged 30) | Middlesbrough | 1934 | |
Defenders
| DF | Jack Astley | (England) | 3 December 1909 (aged 24) | Southport | 1933 | |
| DF | Arthur Bateman | (England) | 1 April 1909 (aged 25) | Southend United | 1934 | |
| DF | Walter Metcalf | (England) | 15 December 1910 (aged 23) | Sunderland | 1934 | |
| DF | George Poyser | (England) | 6 February 1910 (aged 24) | Port Vale | 1934 | |
Midfielders
| HB | Jackie Burns | (England) | 27 November 1906 (aged 27) | Queens Park Rangers | 1931 | Amateur |
| HB | Joe James | (England) | 13 January 1910 (aged 24) | Battersea Church | 1929 | |
| HB | Duncan McKenzie | (Scotland) | 10 August 1912 (aged 22) | Albion Rovers | 1932 | |
| HB | James Raven | (England) | 29 March 1908 (aged 26) | Folkestone | 1934 | Amateur |
| HB | Archie Scott | (Scotland) | 22 July 1905 (aged 29) | Derby County | 1934 | |
| HB | Herbert Watson (c) | (England) | 20 November 1908 (aged 25) | Middlesbrough | 1932 | |
Forwards
| FW | Charlie Fletcher | (England) | 28 October 1905 (aged 28) | Clapton Orient | 1933 | |
| FW | Jack Holliday | (England) | 19 December 1908 (aged 25) | Middlesbrough | 1932 | |
| FW | Idris Hopkins | (Wales) | 11 October 1910 (aged 23) | Crystal Palace | 1932 | |
| FW | Ernest Muttitt | (England) | 24 July 1908 (aged 26) | Middlesbrough | 1932 | |
| FW | George Robson | (England) | 17 June 1908 (aged 26) | West Ham United | 1931 | |
| FW | Billy Scott | (England) | 6 December 1907 (aged 26) | Middlesbrough | 1932 | |

- Sources: 100 Years of Brentford, Timeless Bees, Football League Players' Records 1888 to 1939

== Coaching staff ==
| Name | Role |
|---|---|
| (England) Harry Curtis | Manager |
| (Scotland) Jimmy Bain | Assistant Manager |
| (England) Bob Kane | Trainer |
| (England) Jack Cartmell | Assistant Trainer |
| (England) Fred Keatch | Secretary |

== Statistics ==
=== Appearances and goals ===

Brentford's highest appearance-makers in each position during the Football League season.

| Pos | Nat | Name | League | | FA Cup | | Total | |
| Pos | Nat | Name | Apps | Goals | Apps | Goals | Apps | Goals |
|---|---|---|---|---|---|---|---|---|
| GK | (Scotland) | James Mathieson | 42 | 0 | 1 | 0 | 43 | 0 |
| DF | (England) | Jack Astley | 1 | 0 | 0 | 0 | 1 | 0 |
| DF | (England) | Arthur Bateman | 41 | 1 | 1 | 0 | 42 | 1 |
| DF | (England) | Walter Metcalf | 1 | 0 | 0 | 0 | 1 | 0 |
| DF | (England) | George Poyser | 41 | 0 | 1 | 0 | 42 | 0 |
| HB | (England) | Jackie Burns | 28 | 5 | 1 | 0 | 29 | 5 |
| HB | (England) | Joe James | 39 | 1 | 1 | 0 | 40 | 1 |
| HB | (Scotland) | Duncan McKenzie | 30 | 0 | 1 | 0 | 31 | 0 |
| HB | (England) | James Raven | 1 | 0 | 0 | 0 | 1 | 0 |
| HB | (Scotland) | Archie Scott | 2 | 0 | 0 | 0 | 2 | 0 |
| HB | (England) | Herbert Watson | 27 | 0 | 0 | 0 | 27 | 0 |
| FW | (England) | Charlie Fletcher | 42 | 9 | 1 | 0 | 43 | 9 |
| FW | (England) | Jack Holliday | 42 | 25 | 1 | 0 | 43 | 25 |
| FW | (Wales) | Idris Hopkins | 42 | 16 | 1 | 0 | 43 | 16 |
| FW | (England) | Ernest Muttitt | 14 | 7 | 0 | 0 | 14 | 7 |
| FW | (England) | George Robson | 27 | 10 | 1 | 0 | 28 | 10 |
| FW | (England) | Billy Scott | 42 | 18 | 1 | 0 | 43 | 18 |

- Players listed in italics left the club mid-season.
- Source: 100 Years of Brentford

=== Goalscorers ===
| Pos. | Nat | Player | FL2 | FAC | Total |
|---|---|---|---|---|---|
| FW | (England) | Jack Holliday | 25 | 0 | 25 |
| FW | (England) | Billy Scott | 18 | 0 | 18 |
| FW | (Wales) | Idris Hopkins | 16 | 0 | 16 |
| FW | (England) | George Robson | 10 | 0 | 10 |
| FW | (England) | Charlie Fletcher | 9 | 0 | 9 |
| FW | (England) | Ernest Muttitt | 7 | 0 | 7 |
| HB | (England) | Jackie Burns | 5 | 0 | 5 |
| DF | (England) | Arthur Bateman | 1 | 0 | 1 |
| HB | (England) | Joe James | 1 | 0 | 1 |
| Total | | | 93 | 0 | 93 |

- Players listed in italics left the club mid-season.
- Source: 100 Years of Brentford

=== International caps ===
==== Full ====
| Pos. | Nat | Player | Caps | Goals | Ref |
|---|---|---|---|---|---|
| FW | (Wales) | Idris Hopkins | 2 | 1 | |

==== Amateur ====
| Pos. | Nat | Player | Caps | Goals | Ref |
|---|---|---|---|---|---|
| FW | (England) | Jackie Burns | 3 | 1 | |

=== Management ===
| Name | Nat | From | To | Record All Comps | | | | | Record League | | | | |
| Name | Nat | From | To | P | W | D | L | W % | P | W | D | L | W % |
|---|---|---|---|---|---|---|---|---|---|---|---|---|---|
| Harry Curtis | (England) | 25 August 1934 | 4 May 1935 | 43 | 26 | 9 | 8 | 60.47| | 42 | 26 | 9 | 7 | 61.90 |

=== Summary ===
| Games played | 43 (42 Second Division, 1 FA Cup) |
| Games won | 26 (26 Second Division, 0 FA Cup) |
| Games drawn | 9 (9 Second Division, 0 FA Cup) |
| Games lost | 8 (7 Second Division, 1 FA Cup) |
| Goals scored | 93 (93 Second Division, 0 FA Cup) |
| Goals conceded | 49 (48 Second Division, 1 FA Cup) |
| Clean sheets | 12 (12 Second Division, 0 FA Cup) |
| Biggest league win | 8–0 versus Port Vale, 20 April 1935 |
| Worst league defeat | 3–0 versus Bradford City, 13 October 1934; 4–1 versus Bury, 2 February 1935 |
| Most appearances | 43, Charlie Fletcher, Jack Holliday, Idris Hopkins, James Mathieson (42 Second Division, 1 FA Cup) |
| Top scorer (league) | 25, Jack Holliday |
| Top scorer (all competitions) | 25, Jack Holliday |

== Transfers & loans ==
Cricketers are not included in this list.

Players transferred in
| Date | Pos. | Name | Previous club | Fee | Ref. |
|---|---|---|---|---|---|
| May 1934 | FW | (United States) Jim Brown | (England) Manchester United | £300 | |
| 13 June 1934 | FW | (Scotland) Gerry McAloon | (Scotland) St Francis | Free | |
| June 1934 | FW | (England) Charlie Drinkwater | (England) Golders Green | Amateur | |
| June 1934 | DF | (England) George Poyser | (England) Port Vale | £1,550 | |
| July 1934 | HB | (Scotland) Archie Scott | (England) Derby County | £1,000 | |
| August 1934 | HB | H. Wallace | (England) Jarrow | Amateur | |
| 1934 | DF | (England) George Dumbrell | (England) Bournemouth & Boscombe Athletic | n/a | |
| 1934 | FW | (England) Matt Johnson | (England) Northwich Victoria | n/a | |
| 1934 | GK | (Scotland) James Mathieson | (England) Middlesbrough | Free | |
| 1934 | GK | (England) James Nicholls | (England) Manchester City | Free | |
| 1934 | FW | (England) Les Smith | (England) Petersham | Amateur | |
Players transferred out
| Date | Pos. | Name | Subsequent club | Fee | Ref. |
| December 1933 | FW | (England) Ralph Allen | (England) Charlton Athletic | £650 | |
Players loaned out
| Date | Pos. | Name | Subsequent club | Date to | Ref. |
| August 1934 | FW | (England) Les Smith | (England) Wimbledon | 1935 | |
Players released
| Date | Pos. | Name | Subsequent club | Join date | Ref. |
| May 1935 | FW | (England) Charlie Drinkwater | (England) Golders Green | 1935 | |
| May 1935 | HB | (Scotland) William Hodge | Retired | | |
| May 1935 | FW | (England) Bert Stephens | (England) Brighton & Hove Albion | June 1935 | |
| May 1935 | FW | (England) Charlie Walsh | Retired | | |
