= Archibald Scott =

Archibald Scott may refer to:

- Archibald Scott (moderator) (1837–1909), Scottish minister
- Archie Scott (1905–1990), Scottish footballer
- Archie Scott (cricketer) (1918–2019), Scottish cricketer
