= Bobby Reid (footballer, born 1911) =

Scottish footballer (1911–1987)

Personal information
- Full name: Robert Reid
- Date of birth: 19 February 1911
- Place of birth: Hamilton, Scotland
- Date of death: 16 November 1987 (aged 76)
- Place of death: East Kilbride, Scotland
- Height: 5 ft 8 in (1.73 m)
- Position: Outside left

Youth career
- –1929: Ferniegair Violet
- 1929–1931: Hamilton Academical

Senior career*
Years	Team	Apps	(Gls)
1931–1936	Hamilton Academical	62	(19)
1933	→ Stranraer (loan)		
1936–1939	Brentford	103	(34)
1939–1946	Sheffield United	14	(4)
1946–1947	Bury	17	(1)
1947–1949	Third Lanark		

International career
1934	Scottish League XI	2	(0)
1937–1938	Scotland	2	(0)
- * Club domestic league appearances and goals

Robert Reid (19 February 1911 – 16 November 1987) was a Scottish footballer who played at both professional and international levels as an outside left. His best remembered for his time in the Football League with Brentford, for whom he made 110 appearances. Reid earned the nickname "the Flying Scotsman" for his performances down the wing for Hamilton Academical early in his career.

== Club career ==
Reid began his career in his native Scotland with Hamilton Academical and played for the club in the 1935 Scottish Cup Final. He moved to England in January 1936 to reunite with friend David McCulloch at First Division club Brentford. A spell out following an appendicitis operation in 1936 allowed Les Smith into the team, with whom Reid would battle for a place through the rest of his Bees career. During his three years at Griffin Park, he was among the club's leading scorers, behind David McCulloch.

Reid joined Sheffield United for a £6,000 fee in February 1939 and with his time at the club being affected by the Second World War, he made just 14 league appearances, scoring four goals, before his departure after the war in November 1946. Reid next spent a season with Bury, scoring 1 goal in 17 league appearances, before ending his career with a player-coach spell at Third Lanark.

== International and representative career ==
Reid won two caps for Scotland during the 1937–38 season. He also made two appearances for the Scottish League XI.

== Post-playing career ==
Reid served Bury, Third Lanark, Airdrieonians and former club Hamilton Academical as a physiotherapist, arriving back at Douglas Park in the late 1960s. By the time of his death in November 1987, Reid was still with the Accies, working also as kit man.

== Career statistics ==
Appearances and goals by club, season and competition
Club	Season	League			National cup (Note: Includes Scottish Cup, FA Cup)		Other		Total	
Club	Season	Division	Apps	Goals	Apps	Goals	Apps	Goals	Apps	Goals
Hamilton Academical	1932–33	Scottish First Division	3	0	0	0	—		3	0
Hamilton Academical	1933–34	Scottish First Division	9	2	0	0	2 (Note: 1 appearance and 1 goal in Lanarkshire Cup, 1 appearance in Southern Counties Cup)	1	11	3
Hamilton Academical	1934–35	Scottish First Division	36	12	7	0	1 (Note: Appearance in Southern Counties Cup)	1	44	13
Hamilton Academical	1935–36	Scottish First Division	14	5	0	0	—		14	5
Hamilton Academical	Total		62	19	7	0	3	2	72	21
Brentford	1935–36	First Division	18	3	—		—		18	3
Brentford	1936–37	First Division	28	10	2	2	—		30	12
Brentford	1937–38	First Division	40	17	4	1	1 (Note: Appearance in the Empire Exhibition Trophy)	0	45	18
Brentford	1938–39	First Division	17	3	—		—		17	3
Brentford	Total		103	33	6	3	1	0	110	36
Sheffield United	1946–47	First Division	1	0	—		—		1	0
Career total			166	52	13	3	4	2	183	57

== Honours ==
Hamilton Academical

- Lanarkshire Cup: 1933–34, 1938–39
- Southern Counties Cup: 1933–34, 1934–35

Individual

- PFA Scotland Merit Award
