= Arthur Bateman (footballer, born 1908) =

English footballer

Personal information
- Full name: Arthur Bateman
- Date of birth: 1 April 1909
- Place of birth: Grimsby, England
- Date of death: 30 August 1988 (aged 79)
- Place of death: Grimsby, England
- Height: 5 ft 11 in (1.80 m)
- Position: Full back

Youth career
- Cleethorpes Town

Senior career*
| Years | Team | Apps | (Gls) |
| 1927–1933 | Grimsby Town | 18 | (0) |
| 1933–1934 | Southend United | 19 | (0) |
| 1934–1939 | Brentford | 146 | (1) |
- * Club domestic league appearances and goals

Arthur Bateman (1 April 1909 – 30 August 1988) was an English professional footballer who played as a full back. He is best remembered for his five-year spell in the Football League with Brentford, where he was captain and made over 150 appearances. In 2013, Bateman was named in a Football League 125th anniversary poll as Brentford's fourth-best captain and he was inducted into the club's Hall of Fame in 2015.

== Playing career ==
=== Early years ===
Bateman began his career at Cleethorpes Town, before joining hometown club Grimsby Town in 1927. He was with the club through its heyday in the First Division, but made only 18 appearances across six seasons. Bateman moved to Third Division South club Southend United during the 1933 off-season. He departed the Shrimpers in January 1934, after making 22 appearances.

=== Brentford ===
Bateman joined Second Division club Brentford in January 1934 and made his debut towards the end of the month in a 3–0 victory over Plymouth Argyle at Griffin Park. Nicknamed "Iron Man", Bateman vice-captained the Brentford team which was crowned Second Division champions in the 1934–35 season and secured promoted to the First Division for the only time in the club's history. Bateman's only goal for the club came against Bradford Park Avenue on 22 April 1935, a 40-yard free kick in a 3–2 win which clinched promotion. After the departure of Bert Watson, Bateman was promoted to captain for the 1935–36 season and led the Bees to fifth place in the First Division, the club's highest ever finish in the league pyramid. An injury suffered in a 1–0 victory over Arsenal at Griffin Park in September 1938 brought Bateman's career to a premature end. He made 154 appearances for Brentford and scored one goal during just shy of five years with the club.

== International career ==
Bateman's form for Brentford saw him called up to the England squad for a three-match friendly tour of Europe in May 1938, but he failed to make an appearance.

== Personal life ==
Following his early retirement from football, Bateman returned to Grimsby and became a policeman, retiring in 1969 with the rank of Detective Inspector.

== Career statistics ==
Appearances and goals by club, season and competition
| Club | Season | League | | | FA Cup | | Other | | Total | |
| Club | Season | Division | Apps | Goals | Apps | Goals | Apps | Goals | Apps | Goals |
|---|---|---|---|---|---|---|---|---|---|---|
| Grimsby Town | 1929–30 (Note: Arthur Bateman at WorldFootball.net) | First Division | 6 | 0 | 0 | 0 | — | | 6 | 0 |
| Grimsby Town | 1930–31 | First Division | 2 | 0 | 0 | 0 | — | | 2 | 0 |
| Grimsby Town | 1931–32 | First Division | 5 | 0 | 0 | 0 | — | | 5 | 0 |
| Grimsby Town | Total | | 13 | 0 | 0 | 0 | — | | 13 | 0 |
| Southend United | 1933–34 | Third Division South | 19 | 0 | 3 | 0 | — | | 22 | 0 |
| Brentford | 1933–34 | Second Division | 18 | 0 | — | | — | | 18 | 0 |
| Brentford | 1934–35 | Second Division | 41 | 1 | 1 | 0 | — | | 42 | 1 |
| Brentford | 1935–36 | First Division | 23 | 0 | 0 | 0 | — | | 23 | 0 |
| Brentford | 1936–37 | First Division | 26 | 0 | 2 | 0 | — | | 28 | 0 |
| Brentford | 1937–38 | First Division | 31 | 0 | 4 | 0 | 1 (Note: Appearance in Empire Exhibition Trophy) | 0 | 36 | 0 |
| Brentford | 1938–39 | First Division | 7 | 0 | 0 | 0 | — | | 7 | 0 |
| Brentford | Total | | 146 | 1 | 7 | 0 | 1 | 0 | 154 | 1 |
| Career total | | | 178 | 1 | 10 | 0 | 1 | 0 | 189 | 1 |

== Honours ==
Brentford

- Football League Second Division: 1934–35

Individual

- Brentford Hall of Fame
