= Archie Scott =

Scottish footballer

Personal information
- Full name: Archibald Teasdale Scott
- Date of birth: 22 July 1905
- Place of birth: Airdrie, Scotland
- Date of death: 1990 (aged 84–85)
- Height: 6 ft 1 in (1.85 m)
- Position: Centre half

Senior career*
Years	Team	Apps	(Gls)
1923–1924	Bellshill Athletic		
1924–1925	Gartsherrie Athletic		
1925–1927	Airdrieonians	9	(0)
1927–1934	Derby County	27	(0)
1934–1938	Brentford	5	(0)
- * Club domestic league appearances and goals

Archibald Teasdale Scott (22 July 1905 – 1990) was a Scottish professional footballer who played in the Football League for Derby County and Brentford as a centre half.

== Career statistics ==
Appearances and goals by club, season and competition
Club	Season	League			National Cup		Total	
Club	Season	Division	Apps	Goals	Apps	Goals	Apps	Goals
Airdrieonians	1927-27	Scottish First Division	9	0	0	0	9	0
Derby County	1927–28	First Division	9	0	3	0	12	0
Derby County	1928–29	First Division	3	0	1	0	4	0
Derby County	1929–30	First Division	6	0	0	0	6	0
Derby County	1930–31	First Division	4	0	0	0	4	0
Derby County	1931–32	First Division	1	0	0	0	1	0
Derby County	1933–34	First Division	4	0	1	0	5	0
Derby County	Total		27	0	5	0	32	0
Brentford	1934–35	Second Division	2	0	0	0	2	0
Brentford	1936–37	First Division	2	0	0	0	2	0
Brentford	1937–38	First Division	1	0	0	0	1	0
Brentford	Total		5	0	0	0	5	0
Career total			41	0	5	0	46	0
