= Isaac Fenton =

English footballer (1910–1997)

Issac Fenton
Personal information
- Full name: Issac Fenton
- Date of birth: 30 August 1910
- Place of birth: Birtley, England
- Date of death: 1997 (aged 86–87)
- Height: 5 ft 6 in (1.68 m)
- Position: Outside right

Senior career*
| Years | Team | Apps | (Gls) |
- Birtley
| 1934 | Burnley | 0 | (0) |
| 1936–1937 | Brentford | 0 | (0) |
| 1938 | Hartlepools United | 1 | (0) |
- * Club domestic league appearances and goals

Issac Fenton (30 August 1910 – 1997) was an English professional footballer who made one appearance in the Football League for Hartlepools United as an outside right.

== Career statistics ==
Appearances and goals by club, season and competition
| Club | Season | League | | | FA Cup | | Total | |
| Club | Season | Division | Apps | Goals | Apps | Goals | Apps | Goals |
|---|---|---|---|---|---|---|---|---|
| Hartlepools United | 1937–38 | Third Division North | 1 | 0 | 0 | 0 | 1 | 0 |
| Career total | | | 1 | 0 | 0 | 0 | 1 | 0 |
