= James Raven (footballer) =

English footballer (1908–1965)

Personal information
- Full name: James Raven
- Date of birth: 29 March 1908
- Place of birth: Nottingham, England
- Date of death: 2 January 1965 (aged 56)
- Place of death: Nottingham, England
- Height: 5 ft 11 in (1.80 m)
- Position: Right half

Senior career*
Years	Team	Apps	(Gls)
1931–1933	Notts County	0	(0)
1933–1934	Folkestone		
1934–1936	Brentford	1	(0)
1936–1937	Bristol Rovers	7	(0)
1937–1939	Wrexham	55	(1)
1946	Nottingham Corinthians		
- East End
- Nottingham Co-operative Dairy
- * Club domestic league appearances and goals

James Raven (29 March 1908 – 2 January 1965) was an English professional footballer who played in the Football League for Brentford, Bristol Rovers and Wrexham as a right half.

== Career ==
A right half, Raven began his career at Second Division club Notts County and later dropped into non-League football to join Southern League Eastern Division club Folkestone. Raven returned to the Football League to join Second Division club Brentford in 1934. He made one appearance for the club, in a 0–0 draw with Nottingham Forest on 28 February 1935. Raven spent much of his time in the reserve team and won the 1934–35 London Challenge Cup with the team. He later played in both the Third Division North and South for Wrexham and Bristol Rovers respectively, before his career was brought to a halt by the outbreak of the Second World War.

== Personal life ==
Raven worked for Nottingham Co-operative Dairy for over 20 years.

== Career statistics ==
Appearances and goals by club, season and competition
Club	Season	League			FA Cup		Other		Total	
Club	Season	Division	Apps	Goals	Apps	Goals	Apps	Goals	Apps	Goals
Brentford	1934–35	Second Division	1	0	0	0	―		1	0
Bristol Rovers	1935–36	Third Division South	0	0	―		1 (Note: Appearance in Bristol Hospitals Cup)	0	1	0
Bristol Rovers	1936–37	Third Division South	7	0	0	0	2 (Note: 1 appearance in Third Division South Cup, 1 appearance in Gloucestershire Senior Cup)	0	9	0
Bristol Rovers	Total		7	0	0	0	3	0	10	0
Wrexham	1937–38	Third Division North	36	1	2	0	1 (Note: Appearance in Welsh Cup)	0	39	1
Wrexham	1938–39	Third Division North	19	0	0	0	3 (Note: 2 appearances in Third Division North Cup, 1 appearance in Welsh Cup)	0	22	0
Wrexham	Total		55	1	2	0	4	0	61	1
Career total			63	1	2	0	7	0	72	1

== Honours ==
Brentford Reserves

- London Challenge Cup: 1934–35
