= Jack Holliday =

English footballer (1908–1987)

Personal information
- Full name: John William Holliday
- Date of birth: 19 December 1908
- Place of birth: Cockfield, England
- Date of death: 1987 (aged 78–79)
- Height: 5 ft 10 1/2 in (1.79 m)
- Positions: Forward; wing half

Youth career
- Cockfield

Senior career*
Years	Team	Apps	(Gls)
1930–1932	Middlesbrough	6	(4)
1932–1944	Brentford	213	(116)
1945	Chelmsford City	2	(1)
Total		221	(121)
- * Club domestic league appearances and goals

John William Holliday (19 December 1908 – 1987) was an English professional footballer who played as a forward in the Football League for Brentford and Middlesbrough. In 2013, Holliday was voted by the Brentford supporters as the club's fourth-greatest ever player and he holds the club record for most goals in a season. He was posthumously inducted into the Brentford Hall of Fame in 2015.

== Playing career ==
=== Middlesbrough ===
A forward, Holliday joined hometown club Middlesbrough in March 1930. Behind George Camsell in the pecking order, he spent most of his time in the club's reserve team. He won the North Eastern League title in the 1930–31 and 1931–32 seasons and scored 78 goals during the latter season. Despite these exploits, Holliday rarely featured at first team level, but managed to score four goals in six First Division appearances. He departed Ayresome Park in May 1932.

=== Brentford ===
Holliday and Middlesbrough teammates Billy Scott and Bert Watson moved to join Third Division South club Brentford in May 1932. He flourished under Harry Curtis's management and scored 39 goals in 35 games to send the Bees to the Second Division as 1932–33 Third Division South champions. With 38 league goals, he set the club record for most league goals scored in a season and most league hat-tricks in a season (five), records which have not been surpassed as of 2026. He was also the first player to score five goals in a single game for Brentford, which he achieved in a 5–5 draw with Luton Town on 1 February 1933. The Bees narrowly missed out on a second successive promotion during the 1933–34 season and finished fourth in the Second Division, with Halliday scoring 27 goals from 41 appearances. His 25 goals during the 1934–35 season helped Brentford to the Second Division championship and to promotion to the top tier of English football for the first time in the club's history.

Holliday's goalscoring form in the First Division failed to meet the heights of previous seasons, but he still managed 13 goals from 38 appearances during the 1935–36 season, which culminated in Brentford's highest-ever league placing of fifth. Holliday was eventually converted into a utility player by manager Curtis and he stayed with the Bees throughout the remainder of the 1930s. He played his last professional game for the club on the final day of the 1938–39 season, a 2–0 defeat to Arsenal at Highbury.

The breakout of the Second World War in September 1939 saw professional football suspended, but Holliday remained with the club through the war years. He made his final appearance against Reading on the final day of the 1943–44 season. In seven seasons of competitive football with Brentford, Holliday scored 119 goals in 223 appearances. Only Jim Towers and George Francis have surpassed Holliday's goalscoring record for the club. His 9 hat-tricks in league matches is a club record and he scored 50 goals in all competitions faster than any player in club history.

=== Chelmsford City ===
Following World War II, Holliday had a brief spell at Southern League side Chelmsford City. On 25 August 1945, Holliday made his debut for Chelmsford, scoring in a 2–1 loss against Essex rivals Colchester United, before making his second, and final, appearance for the club, against the same opposition a week later, in a 4–3 win.

== International career ==
Holliday's form during the 1934–35 season saw him called up to represent an England XI in a friendly versus an Anglo-Scots team at Highbury on 8 May 1935. His England team suffered a 1–0 defeat.

== Coaching career ==
After his retirement from football in 1944, Holliday remained with Brentford and served as a trainer to the senior and reserve teams until May 1961.

== Personal life ==
Holliday's father James was an amateur footballer and was killed during the First World War. Holliday was a member of the West Ealing bowling club between 1950 and 1980. He represented Middlesex at the sport and won the West Ealing Championship 10 times. He died in 1987.

== Career statistics ==
Appearances and goals by club, season and competition
Club	Season	League			FA Cup		Total	
Club	Season	Division	Apps	Goals	Apps	Goals	Apps	Goals
Middlesbrough	1930–31	First Division	3	3	0	0	3	3
Middlesbrough	1931–32	First Division	3	1	0	0	3	1
Middlesbrough	Total		6	4	0	0	6	4
Brentford	1932–33	Third Division South	34	38	1	1	35	39
Brentford	1933–34	Second Division	41	27	1	0	42	27
Brentford	1934–35	Second Division	42	25	1	0	43	25
Brentford	1935–36	First Division	37	13	1	0	38	13
Brentford	1936–37	First Division	41	8	2	1	43	9
Brentford	1937–38	First Division	8	0	4	1	12	1
Brentford	1938–39	First Division	10	5	0	0	10	5
Brentford	Total		213	116	10	3	223	119
Career total			219	120	10	3	229	123

== Honours ==
Middlesbrough Reserves

- North Eastern League: 1930–31, 1931–32

Brentford

- Football League Second Division: 1934–35
- Football League Third Division South: 1932–33

Individual

- Brentford Hall of Fame
