= Billy Scott (footballer, born 1907) =

English footballer (1907–1969)

Personal information
- Full name: William Reed Scott
- Date of birth: 6 December 1907
- Place of birth: Willington Quay, England
- Date of death: 12 January 1969 (aged 61)
- Place of death: Southport, England
- Height: 5 ft 7 in (1.70 m)
- Position: Inside forward

Youth career
- 1926–1927: Howden British Legion

Senior career*
Years	Team	Apps	(Gls)
1927–1932	Middlesbrough	26	(5)
1932–1947	Brentford	273	(84)
1947–1948	Aldershot	21	(0)
- Dover
Total		330	(89)

International career
1936	England	1	(0)
- * Club domestic league appearances and goals

William Reed Scott (6 December 1907 – 12 January 1969) was an English professional footballer, who played as an inside forward. He is best remembered for his time with Brentford, for whom he made over 290 appearances. He was posthumously inducted into the Brentford Hall of Fame in 2015. Scott was capped once by England at international level.

== Career ==
=== Middlesbrough ===
Born in Willington Quay, Scott began his senior career at First Division club Middlesbrough in 1927. He made just 28 appearances in five years at Ayresome Park and departed at the end of the 1931–32 season.

=== Brentford ===
Scott signed for Third Division South club Brentford in May 1932 and was joined by former Middlesbrough teammates Jack Holliday and Bert Watson at Griffin Park. Scott quickly made an impression, making 42 appearances and scoring 15 goals in the 1932–33 season, to help the Bees to the Third Division South title. Now playing in the Second Division, further success would follow in the 1934–35 season, when Scott's 18 goals helped Brentford to their second title in three seasons, to secure a place in the First Division for the first time in the club's history. Scott's 18-goal tally also included five goals in an 8–1 win over Barnsley on 15 December 1934, which made him the second Brentford player to achieve the feat after Jack Holliday the previous year.

Scott performed strongly in the First Division and was a virtual ever-present during the 1935–36 and 1936–37 seasons, scoring 11 and 15 goals respectively and in total, he missed just five games in his first five seasons at Griffin Park. Scott played on into the early part of the 1939–40 season, when professional football was suspended due to the break-out of the Second World War. After guesting for Newcastle United, Hartlepools United and Darlington during the war, Scott returned to Brentford after hostilities ended in 1945. By now in his late 30s, Scott made his final appearance for the Bees in a 4–1 FA Cup fourth round replay defeat to Leicester City on 3 February 1947. Scott made 295 appearances and scored 87 goals during his time with Brentford. He was posthumously inducted into the Brentford Hall of Fame in 2015.

=== Aldershot ===
Scott joined Third Division South club Aldershot in 1947 and made 21 appearances before retiring from league football in 1948.

=== Dover ===
Scott ended his career with a short spell at Kent League club Dover, under player-manager and former Brentford teammate George Poyser.

== International career ==
Scott was called up as a reserve for an England v Anglo-Scots match at Highbury in May 1935. Scott's form for Brentford during the 1936–37 season saw him called up to the England squad for a Home International away to Wales on 17 October 1936 and he played in the 2–1 defeat.

== Career statistics ==
Appearances and goals by club, season and competition
Club	Season	League			FA Cup		Total	
Club	Season	Division	Apps	Goals	Apps	Goals	Apps	Goals
Middlesbrough	1930–31	First Division	6	1	0	0	6	1
Middlesbrough	1931–32	First Division	20	4	2	0	22	4
Middlesbrough	Total		26	5	2	0	28	5
Brentford	1932–33	Third Division South	41	14	1	1	42	15
Brentford	1933–34	Second Division	41	12	1	0	42	12
Brentford	1934–35	Second Division	42	18	1	0	43	18
Brentford	1935–36	First Division	39	11	1	0	40	11
Brentford	1936–37	First Division	41	15	2	0	43	15
Brentford	1937–38	First Division	29	8	4	0	33	8
Brentford	1938–39	First Division	28	7	1	0	29	7
Brentford	1945–46	—			8	1	8	1
Brentford	1946–47	First Division	12	0	3	1	15	1
Brentford	Total		273	84	22	3	295	87
Career total			299	89	24	3	323	92

== Honours ==
Brentford

- Football League Second Division: 1934–35
- Football League Third Division South: 1932–33

Individual

- Brentford Hall of Fame
