= Herbert Watson (footballer) =

English footballer

Personal information
- Full name: Herbert Leonard Watson
- Date of birth: 20 November 1908
- Place of birth: Springwell Village, England
- Date of death: 30 October 1939 (aged 30)
- Place of death: Isleworth, England
- Height: 5 ft 9 1/2 in (1.77 m)
- Position: Right half

Youth career
- Pelton Fell
- 1926–1929: Middlesbrough

Senior career*
Years	Team	Apps	(Gls)
1929–1932	Middlesbrough	13	(1)
1932–1936	Brentford	109	(1)
1936–1937	Bristol Rovers	19	(0)
- * Club domestic league appearances and goals

Herbert Leonard Watson (20 November 1908 – 13 October 1939) was an English professional footballer who played in the Football League for Middlesbrough, Brentford and Bristol Rovers. A right half, he is best remembered for his time with Brentford, for whom he made over 100 appearances.

== Playing career ==
=== Middlesbrough ===
Watson began his career at non-League club Pelton Fell and joined Second Division club Middlesbrough in May 1926. He made his debut in a 4–1 First Division victory over Sheffield Wednesday at Ayresome Park on 7 December 1929. Watson made semi-regular appearances for the club through to the end of the 1929–30 season and scored his first goal for the club in a 5–1 win over Birmingham City on 8 February 1930. He made 13 appearances during the campaign. Watson failed to make an appearance during the 1930–31 season and made his first appearance in nearly two years when he played in a 1–1 draw with Aston Villa on 26 December 1931. He made one further appearance during the 1931–32 season and departed Middlesbrough at the end of the campaign, having made just 15 appearances during his six years with the club.

=== Brentford ===
Watson transferred to Third Division South club Brentford in May 1932, joining former Middlesbrough teammates Jack Holliday and Billy Scott at Griffin Park. He led the club to promotion to the Second Division as captain in the 1932–33 season and to the First Division for the first time in the club's history in 1935. After the signing of Dai Richards, Watson lost his place in the team and managed just 13 appearances in the First Division during the 1935–36 season (in which Brentford secured their highest-ever league placing of fifth). He departed the club at the end of the campaign, having made 109 appearances and scored one goal during his four years with the club.

=== Bristol Rovers ===
Watson and Brentford teammates James Raven and Les Sullivan dropped back down to the Third Division South to join Bristol Rovers in April 1936. He made 19 appearances during the 1936–37 season before retiring from football.

== Personal life ==
After retiring from football, Watson ran a pub in Brentford.

== Career statistics ==
Appearances and goals by club, season and competition
Club	Season	League			FA Cup		Other		Total	
Club	Season	Division	Apps	Goals	Apps	Goals	Apps	Goals	Apps	Goals
Middlesbrough	1929–30	First Division	11	1	2	0	—		13	1
Middlesbrough	1931–32	First Division	2	0	0	0	—		2	0
Middlesbrough	Total		13	1	2	0	—		15	1
Brentford	1932–33	Third Division South	34	0	0	0	—		34	0
Brentford	1933–34	Second Division	35	1	0	0	—		35	1
Brentford	1934–35	Second Division	27	0	0	0	—		27	0
Brentford	1935–36	First Division	13	0	0	0	—		13	0
Brentford	Total		109	1	0	0	—		109	1
Bristol Rovers	1936–37	Third Division South	19	0	0	0	1 (Note: Appearance in Third Division South Cup)	0	20	0
Career total			141	2	2	0	1	0	144	2

== Honours ==
Brentford

- Football League Second Division: 1934–35
- Football League Third Division South: 1932–33
