= Idris Hopkins =

Welsh footballer

Personal information
- Full name: Idris Morgan Hopkins
- Date of birth: 11 October 1910
- Place of birth: Merthyr Tydfil, Wales
- Date of death: 9 October 1994 (aged 83)
- Place of death: High Wycombe, England
- Position: Outside right

Senior career*
| Years | Team | Apps | (Gls) |
| 1925–1926 | New Road Amateurs | | |
| 1926–1927 | Gellifaelog Amateurs | | |
| 1929–1930 | Sheffield Wednesday | 0 | (0) |
| 1930–1931 | Dartford | | |
| 1931–1932 | Ramsgate Press Wanderers | | |
| 1932 | Crystal Palace | 4 | (0) |
| 1932–1947 | Brentford | 293 | (77) |
| 1947–1948 | Bristol City | 27 | (0) |
| Total | | 303 | (77) |

International career
| 1934–1939 | Wales | 12 | (2) |
- * Club domestic league appearances and goals

Idris Morgan Hopkins (11 October 1910 – 9 October 1994) was a Welsh footballer famed for his talented right foot. He played for many clubs throughout his career, but most famously Brentford where he captained them in the English First Division. He is a member of the Brentford Hall of Fame.

== Early life ==
Hopkins was born in the mining town of Merthyr Tydfil in Wales, son of a coal miner. He was naturally right footed but spent a great deal of time improving his weaker left foot repeatedly kicking a ball against a wall until it was of equal standard. Before turning professional he played football at an amateur level for Gellyfaelog and New Road.

== Professional football career ==
Hopkins' first taste of professional football came with spells at Football League sides Merthyr Town and Sheffield Wednesday in 1927 and 1929 respectively. He failed to make a league appearance for either side before dropping back into non-league football with Dartford and Ramsgate Press Wanderers. He moved on to Crystal Palace in 1932 where he played 4 games before being transferred to Brentford.

It was at Brentford where he established himself as a footballer as part of their greatest ever team. He wore the number 7 shirt and was an old fashioned inside forward with two good feet and a determined attitude. Between 1932 and 1947 and he made 314 official appearances, scoring 77 goals and added over 200 appearances and 49 goals during the Second World War.

In 1946 Brentford, in Division 1, and with Hopkins as club captain were relegated to Division 2. During that season he made 43 appearances and scored four goals. This season was the last that Brentford were in the top flight of English football until they won promotion in 2021.

In May 1947 he left Brentford and signed for Bristol City where he played 27 times before retiring in 1948 at the age of 40.

He also made two appearances for West Ham United as a guest player during World War II.

His weekly wage was £12, the maximum permitted under league rules. He was inducted into the Brentford Hall of Fame in 1991.

== International career ==
Hopkins was capped 12 times for Wales playing in the British Home Championships between 1934 and 1939, and undoubtedly would have won more if it hadn't been for World War II. He also made 9 appearances for Wales in wartime internationals scoring once.

Perhaps the most notable international match he appeared in was Wales 4–2 victory over England in 1938 at Ninian Park as part of the 1939 British Home Championship. Hopkins was amongst the scorers for Wales with Stanley Matthews and Tommy Lawton netting for England.

Full Internationals
| Home Side | Away Side | Date | Score | Ground | Goals |
|---|---|---|---|---|---|
| Scotland | Wales | 21 November 1934 | 3–2 | Pittodrie Aberdeen | 0 |
| Wales | Ireland | 27 March 1935 | 3–1 | Racecourse Ground Wrexham | 1 |
| England | Wales | 5 February 1936 | 1–2 | Molineux Wolverhampton | 0 |
| Ireland | Wales | 11 March 1936 | 3–2 | Celtic Park Belfast | 0 |
| Wales | England | 17 October 1936 | 2–1 | Ninian Park Cardiff | 0 |
| Scotland | Wales | 2 December 1936 | 1–2 | Dens Park Dundee | 0 |
| Wales | Ireland | 17 March 1937 | 4–1 | Racecourse Ground Wrexham | 0 |
| England | Wales | 17 November 1937 | 2–1 | Ayresome Park Middlesbrough | 0 |
| Ireland | Wales | 16 March 1938 | 1–0 | Windsor Park Belfast | 0 |
| Wales | England | 22 October 1938 | 4–2 | Ninian Park Cardiff | 1 |
| Scotland | Wales | 9 November 1938 | 3–2 | Tynecastle Edinburgh | 0 |
| Wales | Northern Ireland | 15 March 1939 | 3–2 | Racecourse Ground Wrexham | 0 |

Wartime Internationals
| Home Side | Away Side | Date | Score | Ground | Goals |
|---|---|---|---|---|---|
| Wales | England | 11 November 1939 | 1–1 | Ninian Park Cardiff | 0 |
| Wales | England | 18 November 1939 | 2–3 | Racecourse Ground Wrexham | 0 |
| England | Wales | 13 April 1940 | 0–1 | Wembley | 0 |
| England | Wales | 26 April 1941 | 4–1 | City Ground Nottingham | 0 |
| England | Wales | 25 October 1941 | 2–1 | St. Andrews Birmingham | 1 |
| Wales | England | 9 May 1942 | 1–0 | Ninian Park Cardiff | 0 |
| England | Wales | 24 October 1942 | 1–2 | Molineux Wolves | 0 |
| England | Wales | 22 February 1942 | 5–3 | Wembley | 0 |
| Wales | England | 5 May 1944 | 0–2 | Ninian Park Cardiff | 0 |

== Honours ==
=== As a player ===
Brentford

- Football League Second Division Championship: 1934–35
- Football League Third Division Championship: 1932-33
- London War Cup Winner: 1941-42

=== As an individual ===
- Brentford Hall of Fame

== Non-playing career and retirement ==
After retirement as a footballer, Hopkins had spells coaching in Sweden with IFK Norrkoping and FK Slepnier, and in Turkey with Demirspor F.C. He also managed Ramsgate, Portadown and Sutton United. He eventually moved to Middlesex where he owned and ran a confectionery shop in Harefield during the 1960s and 1970s before settling in Buckinghamshire with his wife, Nancy, and sons Barry and Ashley.

Hopkins died on 9 October 1994 two days before his 84th birthday. A minutes' silence was held as a mark of respect before Brentford's match on the following Saturday.
