= George Poyser =

English footballer (1910–1995)

Personal information
- Full name: George Henry Poyser
- Date of birth: 6 February 1910
- Place of birth: Stanton Hill, England
- Date of death: 30 January 1995 (aged 84)
- Place of death: Skegby, England
- Height: 5 ft 11 1/2 in (1.82 m)
- Position: Left-back

Youth career
- 1925–1927: Teversal Colliery
- 1927–1928: Stanton Hill Victoria

Senior career*
Years	Team	Apps	(Gls)
1928–1929	Wolverhampton Wanderers	0	(0)
1929–1930	Stourbridge		
1930–1931	Mansfield Town		
1931–1934	Port Vale	72	(0)
1934–1946	Brentford	149	(0)
1946–1947	Plymouth Argyle	3	(0)
1947–1950	Dover		

Managerial career
- 1947–1950: Dover
- 1953–1957: Notts County
- 1963–1965: Manchester City
- * Club domestic league appearances and goals

George Henry Poyser (6 February 1910 – 30 January 1995) was an English football player and manager.

A left-back, he enjoyed a lengthy playing career, the tail end of which was interrupted by World War II. He played for Wolverhampton Wanderers, Stourbridge, Mansfield Town, Port Vale, Brentford, and Plymouth Argyle. He helped Brentford to win the Second Division title in 1934–35.

He became a coach and manager after the war, taking charge of Dover, Notts County and Manchester City. He took County into the quarter-finals of the FA Cup, though he was better equipped as a scout than as a manager.

== Playing career ==
Poyser played as a defender and was a strong left-back. Playing for Teversal Colliery, he had an unsuccessful trial at Mansfield Town, before moving on to Stanton Hill Victoria. He enjoyed spells at Wolverhampton Wanderers and Stourbridge, before signing with Mansfield Town. He was part of the Mansfield team when they were elected to the Football League in 1931.

In May 1931, he joined Port Vale of the Second Division. His debut came on 2 January 1932, in a 2–0 win over Plymouth Argyle at the Old Recreation Ground. However, he totalled just six appearances for the "Valiants" in the 1931–32 campaign. He featured 28 times in the 1932–33 season before establishing himself in the first team with 39 appearances in the 1933–34 campaign. He made 72 league appearances for Port Vale.

In June 1934 he transferred to Brentford for a fee of £1,550, a club record. In his first season at Brentford, the club won the Second Division championship. The "Bees" finished fifth in the First Division in 1935–36, sixth in 1936–37 and 1937–38, and then 18th in 1938–39. He remained at Griffin Park for a decade, making 157 appearances, though like many players of his era, the Second World War shortened his career, though he represented Brentford in the non-competitive wartime competitions.

The 36-year-old Poyser joined Plymouth Argyle for a £3,500 fee late in the 1945–46 season, making three Football League South appearances and a further three Second Division appearances. He left Home Park at the end of the 1946–47 season.

== Managerial career ==
=== Dover ===
Poyser first turned to management with Dover, where he was appointed player-manager on 21 November 1947. He managed the club in the Kent Football League for three successful seasons, before departing in May 1950; the supporters' association chairman stated that "his genial personality, his wealth of football knowledge, and his aptitude to make friends had played a tremendously important part in the town club's success". He then returned to his old professional clubs in a coaching capacity, becoming the assistant trainer at Brentford and a coach at Wolverhampton Wanderers.

=== Notts County ===
His management career gained more recognition at Notts County, whom he managed between October 1953 and January 1957, reaching the FA Cup quarter-finals in 1955. Former Notts County winger Gordon Wills regards Poyser as the best manager he played for. The "Magpies" struggled in the lower half of the Second Division during his four seasons at Meadow Lane. However, they did reach seventh in the 1954–55 season.

=== Manchester City ===
In January 1957, Poyser joined Manchester City as assistant to Les McDowall, with a reputation for being a talented scout. Manchester City were relegated to the Second Division in 1963, and McDowall left the club. On 11 June 1963, Poyser was appointed as his replacement. He made three key signings in Derek Kevan, Jimmy Murray, and Johnny Crossan, whilst promoting home-grown talent in Alan Oakes and Glyn Pardoe – both of whom went on to build long careers at the club. In his first season, the club reached the League Cup semi-finals but were well short of promotion in the league, finishing sixth. His second season proved disappointing. In January 1965, the club reached a low point with their lowest ever league attendance of 8,015 against Swindon Town. Poyser himself was not at the stadium, as he had elected to perform a scouting mission instead. At Easter Poyser was sacked. The club finished the season in their then-lowest-ever position of 11th in the Second Division. His replacement, Joe Mercer, went on to great success at Maine Road.

== Career statistics ==
=== Club statistics ===
Appearances and goals by club, season and competition
Club	Season	League			FA Cup		Total	
Club	Season	Division	Apps	Goals	Apps	Goals	Apps	Goals
Wolverhampton Wanderers	1928–29	Second Division	0	0	0	0	0	0
Port Vale	1931–32	Second Division	6	0	0	0	6	0
Port Vale	1932–33	Second Division	28	0	0	0	28	0
Port Vale	1933–34	Second Division	38	0	1	0	39	0
Port Vale	Total		72	0	1	0	73	0
Brentford	1934–35	Second Division	41	0	1	0	42	0
Brentford	1935–36	First Division	28	0	1	0	29	0
Brentford	1936–37	First Division	31	0	2	0	33	0
Brentford	1937–38	First Division	16	0	0	0	16	0
Brentford	1938–39	First Division	33	0	1	0	34	0
Brentford	1945–46	—	—		3	0	3	0
Brentford	Total		149	0	8	0	157	0
Plymouth Argyle	1946–47	Second Division	3	0	0	0	3	0
Career total			224	0	9	0	233	0

=== Managerial statistics ===
Managerial record by team and tenure
Team	From	To	Record				
Team	From	To	P	W	D	L	Win %
Notts County	22 October 1953	7 January 1957	149	53	31	65	35.6
Manchester City	12 July 1963	13 April 1965	89	38	17	34	42.7

== Honours ==
Brentford

- Football League Second Division: 1934–35
- London War Cup: 1941–42

Individual

- Brentford Hall of Fame
