= David McCulloch =

Scottish footballer and manager

Personal information
- Full name: David McCulloch
- Date of birth: 5 October 1912
- Place of birth: Hamilton, Scotland
- Date of death: 21 June 1979 (aged 66)
- Place of death: East Kilbride, Scotland
- Height: 5 ft 10 in (1.78 m)
- Position: Striker

Youth career
- 1930–1931: Hamilton Amateurs

Senior career*
Years	Team	Apps	(Gls)
1931–1932	Shotts United		
1932–1934	Third Lanark	34	(22)
1934–1935	Heart of Midlothian	57	(54)
1935–1938	Brentford	117	(85)
1938–1946	Derby County	31	(16)
1946–1947	Leicester City	4	(2)
1947–1949	Bath City		
1949–1951	Waterford United	28	(24)
Total		209	(157)

International career
1934–1938	Scotland	7	(3)
1934	Scottish League XI	1	(1)

Managerial career
- 1951–1952: Alloa Athletic
- * Club domestic league appearances and goals

David McCulloch (5 October 1912 – 21 June 1979) was a Scottish footballer who played for several Scottish and English clubs in the 1930s, most notably Heart of Midlothian, Brentford and Derby County. He also represented Scotland at full international level.

== Biography ==
McCulloch, a striker, began his senior career with Third Lanark, whom he joined from junior side Shotts United in 1932. After two years at Cathkin Park, he was signed by Hearts for £530, moving east at the same time as his Thirds teammate John MacKenzie. His first season at Tynecastle was notable, as he scored 38 times (at an average of a goal per game) to top the First Division scoring charts. Such a goal-scoring ratio helped Hearts to both a third-place finish and increased attendances, although Double-winners Rangers proved too strong in the Scottish Cup semi-finals. Costs incurred by work to improve Tynecastle's facilities and capacity were proving a financial millstone and in November 1935, the Hearts board indicated that certain players were available for transfer. McCulloch was by this stage one of five Scotland players on the club's books, having made his debut against Wales a year earlier, and an obvious transfer target. After numerous expressions of interest from English clubs, McCulloch and international teammate Alex Massie were sold to offset the debt, McCulloch joining London side Brentford for a club record incoming fee of £6,000.

McCulloch continued his prodigious scoring rate with the Bees and by the end of the 1938–39 season he had scored total of 178 goals from 234 league (English and Scottish) games. He also remained a Scotland regular, earning a further 6 caps during which he scored 3 goals, including 2 against Czechoslovakia in December 1937.

McCulloch was transferred to Derby County for £9,500 in October 1938 but his time with his new club was disrupted by the Second World War, which began while he was at the peak of his abilities and curtailed his international career. During the conflict he "guested" for no less than six clubs, military demands ensuring footballers such as him were seldom resident in one location for an extended period of time. McCulloch's temporary sides were: Falkirk, Brentford, Aldershot, Chelsea, Bournemouth & Boscombe Athletic and Swansea Town. At the war's conclusion he signed for Derby's rivals Leicester City before finishing his career with non-league Bath City and Irish side Waterford United.

While with Waterford McCulloch assisted with coaching and in 1951 he returned to Scotland as manager of Alloa Athletic, a position he held for one season.

== Honours ==
- Brentford Hall of Fame
