= London Challenge Cup =

- Crystal Palace team of 1921 with the London Challenge Cup (trophy at right)
- Organiser(s): London FA
- Founded: 1908
- Abolished: 2000
- Region: London
- Teams: varies
- Last champions: Uxbridge (3rd title)
- Most championships: Arsenal (11 titles)

The London Challenge Cup was a football tournament formerly organised by the London FA. It was first contested in 1908, and other than during the World Wars, was contested every season until 1974, when the tournament was disbanded.

After a 16-year hiatus, the tournament was resurrected in 1990–91, but only lasted 10 years before being once again discontinued.

In its original guise, the tournament was won by most of the major professional clubs in London such as Arsenal, Chelsea, Tottenham Hotspur and West Ham United, but the quality of entrants after the revival was lower, with all the winners except Leyton Orient in 1992–93 being non-League clubs.

== Results of finals ==
=== Key ===
Match went to a replay
Match went to extra time
Match decided by a penalty shootout after extra time

Season	Winners	Result	Runner-up	Notes
1908–09	Millwall	2–0	Leyton	
1909–10	Fulham	4–1	Tottenham Hotspur	
1910–11	Tottenham Hotspur	2–1	Fulham	
1911–12	Clapton Orient	3–0	Millwall	
1912–13	Crystal Palace	4–0	Millwall	Replay. First match 1–1.
1913–14	Crystal Palace	2–1	Tottenham Hotspur	
1914–15	Millwall	2–1	Arsenal	
1915–1919	No competition due to World War I.			
1919–20	Chelsea	1–0	Crystal Palace	
1920–21	Crystal Palace	1–0	Clapton Orient	
1921–22	Arsenal	1–0	Crystal Palace	
1922–23	Charlton Athletic	2–1	Crystal Palace	
1923–24	Arsenal	3–2	Charlton Athletic	Some sources say 3–1.
1924–25	West Ham United	2–1	Clapton Orient	
1925–26	West Ham United	2–1	Arsenal	
1926–27	Chelsea	2–1	Clapton Orient	
1927–28	Millwall	6–3	Leyton	
1928–29	Tottenham Hotspur	5–1	Millwall	
1929–30	West Ham United	2–1	Brentford	
1930–31	Arsenal	2–1	Tottenham Hotspur	
1931–32	Fulham	2–1	Crystal Palace	
1932–33	Queens Park Rangers	3–0	West Ham United	
1933–34	Arsenal	4–0	Tottenham Hotspur	
1934–35	Brentford	2–1	Millwall	
1935–36	Arsenal	4–2	Brentford	
1936–37	Tottenham Hotspur	1–0	Arsenal	
1937–38	Millwall	4–0	Crystal Palace	
1938–39	Queens Park Rangers	3–1	Tottenham Hotspur	
1939–1946	No competition due to World War II.			
1946–47	West Ham United	3–2	Crystal Palace	
1947–48	Tottenham Hotspur	3–1	Fulham	
1948–49	West Ham United	2–1	Chelsea	Replay. First match 1–1.
1949–50	Chelsea	3–0	Brentford	Replay. First match 4–4.
1950–51	Charlton Athletic	2–1	Brentford	
1951–52	Fulham	1–0	Charlton Athletic	
1952–53	West Ham United	2–1	Brentford	
1953–54	Arsenal	3–2	Chelsea	Replay. First match 1–1.
1954–55	Arsenal	2–1	West Ham United	
1955–56	Queens Park Rangers	2–1	Brentford	
1956–57	West Ham United	3–1	Millwall	
1957–58	Arsenal	3–1	West Ham United	
1958–59	Tottenham Hotspur	3–1	West Ham United	
1959–60	Chelsea	2–1	Tooting & Mitcham United	
1960–61	Chelsea	3–1	Arsenal	
1961–62	Arsenal	3–1	Millwall	
1962–63	Arsenal	4–1	Chelsea	
1963–64	Tottenham Hotspur	2–0	Chelsea	
1964–65	Brentford	2–1	Chelsea	
1965–66	Queens Park Rangers	4–0	Arsenal	
1966–67	Brentford	2–1	Fulham	Replay.
1967–68	West Ham United	3–1	Dagenham	
1968–69	West Ham United	3–2	Tottenham Hotspur	Replay. First match 2–2.
1969–70	Arsenal	2–1	Wimbledon	
1970–71	Tottenham Hotspur	1–0	Wimbledon	
1971–72	Orient	2–1	Dagenham	Replay. First match 1–1.
1972–73	Orient	2–1	Enfield	
1973–74	Tottenham Hotspur	5–0	Hayes	
Revived Period
Season	Winners	Result	Runner-up	Notes
1990–91	Carshalton Athletic	4–2	Welling United	
1991–92	Welling United	2–0	Dulwich Hamlet	
1992–93	Leyton Orient	3–2	Barnet	
1993–94	Uxbridge	3–0	Welling United	
1994–95	St Albans City	6–0	Fisher Athletic	
1995–96	Bromley	3–2	Leyton Pennant	
1996–97	Uxbridge	1–0	Leyton Pennant	Replay. First match 3–3.
1997–98	Boreham Wood	3–1	Uxbridge	
1998–99	Dulwich Hamlet	2–1	Uxbridge	After extra-time.
1999–2000	Uxbridge	2–2	Dulwich Hamlet	Won 5–4 on penalties. After extra-time.

=== Results by teams ===
Club	Wins	First final won	Last final won	Runner-up	Last final lost	Total final apps.	Notes
Arsenal	11	1921–22	1969–70	5	1965–66	16	
West Ham United	9	1924–25	1968–69	4	1958–59	13	
Tottenham Hotspur	8	1910–11	1973–74	6	1968–69	14	
Chelsea	5	1919–20	1960–61	5	1964–65	10	
Millwall	4	1908–09	1937–38	6	1961–62	10	
Leyton Orient	4	1911–12	1992–93	3	1926–27	7	(Note: Won 2 titles as Orient and 1 title as Clapton Orient.)
Queens Park Rangers	4	1932–33	1965–66	0	–	4	
Brentford	3	1934–35	1966–67	6	1955–56	9	
Crystal Palace	3	1912–13	1920–21	6	1946–47	9	
Fulham	3	1909–10	1951–52	3	1966–67	6	
Uxbridge	3	1993–94	1999–2000	2	1998–99	5	
Charlton Athletic	2	1922–23	1950–51	2	1951–52	4	
Dulwich Hamlet	1	1998–99	1998–99	2	1999–2000	3	
Welling United	1	1991–92	1991–92	2	1993–94	3	
Boreham Wood	1	1997–98	1997–98	0	–	1	
Bromley	1	1995–96	1995–96	0	–	1	
Carshalton Athletic	1	1990–91	1990–91	0	–	1	
St Albans City	1	1994–95	1994–95	0	–	1	
Dagenham †	0	–	–	2	1971–72	2	(Note: Dissolved in 1992. Merged with Redbridge Forest to form Dagenham & Redbridge.)
Leyton †	0	–	–	2	1927–28	2	(Note: Dissolved in 2011.)
Leyton Pennant	0	–	–	2	1996–97	2	
Wimbledon †	0	–	–	2	1970–71	2	(Note: Dissolved in 2004. Relocated to Milton Keynes.)
Barnet	0	–	–	1	1992–93	1	
Enfield	0	–	–	1	1972–73	1	
Fisher Athletic †	0	–	–	1	1994–95	1	(Note: Dissolved in 2009.)
Hayes †	0	–	–	1	1973–74	1	(Note: Dissolved in 2007.)
Tooting & Mitcham United	0	–	–	1	1959–60	1	

== Derbies in the final ==
Derby/Rivalry	Season	Winners	Result	Runner-up	Notes
North London derby	1933–34	Arsenal	4–0	Tottenham Hotspur	
North London derby	1930–31	Arsenal	2–1	Tottenham Hotspur	
North London derby	1936–37	Tottenham Hotspur	1–0	Arsenal	
Arsenal–Chelsea	1953–54	Arsenal	3–2	Chelsea	
Arsenal–Chelsea	1960–61	Chelsea	3–1	Arsenal	
Arsenal–Chelsea	1962–63	Arsenal	4–1	Chelsea	
Chelsea–Tottenham Hotspur	1963–64	Tottenham Hotspur	2–0	Chelsea	
Dockers derby	1956–57	West Ham United	3–1	Millwall	
East London derby	1924–25	West Ham United	2–1	Clapton Orient	(Note: Leyton Orient were known as Clapton Orient from 1898 to 1929.)
South London derby	1912–13	Crystal Palace	4–0	Millwall	
South London derby	1922–23	Charlton Athletic	2–1	Crystal Palace	
South London derby	1937–38	Millwall	4–0	Crystal Palace	
West London derby	1949–50	Chelsea	3–0	Brentford	
West London derby	1955–56	Queens Park Rangers	2–1	Brentford	
West London derby	1964–65	Brentford	2–1	Chelsea	
West London derby	1966–67	Brentford	2–1	Fulham	
