= 1933–34 Rochdale A.F.C. season =

English football club season

Rochdale
1933–34 season
- Manager: Herbert Hopkinson
- Stadium: Spotland Stadium
- Football League Third Division North: 22nd
- FA Cup: 1st Round
- Top goalscorer: League: Jack Robson (10); All: Jack Robson (10)

The 1933–34 season was Rochdale A.F.C.'s 27th in existence and their 13th in the Football League Third Division North.

== Squad Statistics ==
=== Appearances and goals ===
| No. | Pos | Nat | Player | Total | | Division 3 North | | FA Cup | | Division 3 North Cup | |
| No. | Pos | Nat | Player | Apps | Goals | Apps | Goals | Apps | Goals | Apps | Goals |
|---|---|---|---|---|---|---|---|---|---|---|---|
| | GK | (England) ENG | Bert Welch | 11 | 0 | 11 | 0 | 0 | 0 | 0 | 0 |
| | DF | (England) ENG | Wally Webster | 40 | 0 | 38 | 0 | 1 | 0 | 1 | 0 |
| | DF | (England) ENG | Ben Wheelhouse | 28 | 2 | 27 | 2 | 1 | 0 | 0 | 0 |
| | MF | (England) ENG | Jack Gordon | 35 | 1 | 34 | 1 | 0 | 0 | 1 | 0 |
| | MF | (Scotland) SCO | David Bain | 34 | 0 | 32 | 0 | 1 | 0 | 1 | 0 |
| | DF | (England) ENG | Walter Buckley | 36 | 1 | 34 | 1 | 1 | 0 | 1 | 0 |
| | MF | (England) ENG | Will Rigby | 34 | 3 | 32 | 2 | 1 | 1 | 1 | 0 |
| | FW | (Scotland) SCO | John Cairns | 5 | 0 | 5 | 0 | 0 | 0 | 0 | 0 |
| | FW | (Scotland) SCO | Jack Smith | 26 | 8 | 25 | 8 | 1 | 0 | 0 | 0 |
| | FW | (Scotland) SCO | Tony Weldon | 28 | 7 | 27 | 7 | 0 | 0 | 1 | 0 |
| | MF | (England) ENG | Clarrie Murfin | 27 | 7 | 26 | 7 | 0 | 0 | 1 | 0 |
| | DF | (England) ENG | Jack Butler | 6 | 0 | 5 | 0 | 0 | 0 | 1 | 0 |
| | FW | (England) ENG | Harry Hope | 2 | 0 | 2 | 0 | 0 | 0 | 0 | 0 |
| | FW | (England) ENG | Harry Chadwick | 1 | 0 | 1 | 0 | 0 | 0 | 0 | 0 |
| | MF | (England) ENG | Willie Barrott | 1 | 0 | 1 | 0 | 0 | 0 | 0 | 0 |
| | DF | (England) ENG | Stephen Spargo | 4 | 0 | 4 | 0 | 0 | 0 | 0 | 0 |
| | FW | (England) ENG | Jimmy Collins | 31 | 8 | 30 | 6 | 0 | 0 | 1 | 2 |
| | MF | (England) ENG | Dermot Hoadley | 2 | 0 | 2 | 0 | 0 | 0 | 0 | 0 |
| | FW | (Scotland) SCO | Danny McRorie | 5 | 0 | 5 | 0 | 0 | 0 | 0 | 0 |
| | GK | (England) ENG | Cliff Walmsley | 33 | 0 | 31 | 0 | 1 | 0 | 1 | 0 |
| | MF | (Scotland) SCO | William Peters | 1 | 0 | 1 | 0 | 0 | 0 | 0 | 0 |
| | DF | (England) ENG | Walter Slicer | 4 | 0 | 4 | 0 | 0 | 0 | 0 | 0 |
| | FW | (England) ENG | Fred Fitton | 14 | 6 | 13 | 6 | 1 | 0 | 0 | 0 |
| | MF | (England) ENG | Jack Robson | 30 | 10 | 28 | 10 | 1 | 0 | 1 | 0 |
| | MF | (England) ENG | Billy Benton | 7 | 3 | 6 | 3 | 1 | 0 | 0 | 0 |
| | DF | (England) ENG | Tom Smith | 26 | 0 | 25 | 0 | 1 | 0 | 0 | 0 |
| | MF | (England) ENG | Thomas Shepherd | 4 | 0 | 4 | 0 | 0 | 0 | 0 | 0 |
| | FW | (England) ENG | Jimmy Coneys | 2 | 0 | 2 | 0 | 0 | 0 | 0 | 0 |
| | DF | (England) ENG | Arnold Bliss | 5 | 0 | 5 | 0 | 0 | 0 | 0 | 0 |
| | MF | (England) ENG | Harry Longbottom | 2 | 0 | 2 | 0 | 0 | 0 | 0 | 0 |

Squad Statistics (Non-competitive)

=== Appearances and goals (Non-competitive) ===
| No. | Pos | Nat | Player | Total | | Lancashire Cup | | Manchester Cup | |
| No. | Pos | Nat | Player | Apps | Goals | Apps | Goals | Apps | Goals |
|---|---|---|---|---|---|---|---|---|---|
| | GK | (England) ENG | Bert Welch | 1 | 0 | 0 | 0 | 1 | 0 |
| | DF | (England) ENG | Wally Webster | 2 | 0 | 1 | 0 | 1 | 0 |
| | DF | (England) ENG | Ben Wheelhouse | 2 | 0 | 1 | 0 | 1 | 0 |
| | MF | (England) ENG | Jack Gordon | 1 | 0 | 1 | 0 | 0 | 0 |
| | MF | (Scotland) SCO | David Bain | 2 | 0 | 1 | 0 | 1 | 0 |
| | DF | (England) ENG | Walter Buckley | 1 | 0 | 1 | 0 | 0 | 0 |
| | MF | (England) ENG | Will Rigby | 2 | 0 | 1 | 0 | 1 | 0 |
| | FW | (Scotland) SCO | John Cairns | 0 | 0 | 0 | 0 | 0 | 0 |
| | FW | (Scotland) SCO | Jack Smith | 2 | 1 | 1 | 1 | 1 | 0 |
| | FW | (Scotland) SCO | Tony Weldon | 2 | 0 | 1 | 0 | 1 | 0 |
| | MF | (England) ENG | Clarrie Murfin | 1 | 0 | 0 | 0 | 1 | 0 |
| | DF | (England) ENG | Jack Butler | 1 | 0 | 0 | 0 | 1 | 0 |
| | FW | (England) ENG | Harry Hope | 0 | 0 | 0 | 0 | 0 | 0 |
| | FW | (England) ENG | Harry Chadwick | 0 | 0 | 0 | 0 | 0 | 0 |
| | MF | (England) ENG | Willie Barrott | 0 | 0 | 0 | 0 | 0 | 0 |
| | DF | (England) ENG | Stephen Spargo | 0 | 0 | 0 | 0 | 0 | 0 |
| | FW | (England) ENG | Jimmy Collins | 1 | 0 | 1 | 0 | 0 | 0 |
| | MF | (England) ENG | Dermot Hoadley | 1 | 0 | 1 | 0 | 0 | 0 |
| | FW | (Scotland) SCO | Danny McRorie | 0 | 0 | 0 | 0 | 0 | 0 |
| | GK | (England) ENG | Cliff Walmsley | 1 | 0 | 0 | 0 | 1 | 0 |
| | MF | (Scotland) SCO | William Peters | 0 | 0 | 0 | 0 | 0 | 0 |
| | DF | (England) ENG | Walter Slicer | 0 | 0 | 0 | 0 | 0 | 0 |
| | FW | (England) ENG | Fred Fitton | 1 | 0 | 0 | 0 | 1 | 0 |
| | MF | (England) ENG | Jack Robson | 0 | 0 | 0 | 0 | 0 | 0 |
| | MF | (England) ENG | Billy Benton | 0 | 0 | 0 | 0 | 0 | 0 |
| | DF | (England) ENG | Tom Smith | 0 | 0 | 0 | 0 | 0 | 0 |
| | MF | (England) ENG | Thomas Shepherd | 0 | 0 | 0 | 0 | 0 | 0 |
| | FW | (England) ENG | Jimmy Coneys | 0 | 0 | 0 | 0 | 0 | 0 |
| | DF | (England) ENG | Arnold Bliss | 0 | 0 | 0 | 0 | 0 | 0 |
| | MF | (England) ENG | Harry Longbottom | 1 | 0 | 0 | 0 | 1 | 0 |

== Final league table ==
| Pos | Team | Pld | W | D | L | GF | GA | GAv | Pts | Promotion |
|---|---|---|---|---|---|---|---|---|---|---|
| 18 | Southport | 42 | 8 | 17 | 17 | 63 | 90 | 0.700 | 33 | |
| 19 | Gateshead | 42 | 12 | 9 | 21 | 76 | 110 | 0.691 | 33 | |
| 20 | Accrington Stanley | 42 | 13 | 7 | 22 | 65 | 101 | 0.644 | 33 | |
| 21 | Rotherham United | 42 | 10 | 8 | 24 | 53 | 91 | 0.582 | 28 | Re-elected |
| 22 | Rochdale | 42 | 9 | 6 | 27 | 53 | 103 | 0.515 | 24 | Re-elected |

Source: rsssf.com

== Competitions ==
=== Football League Third Division North ===
| 26 August 1933 1 | Rochdale | 1–0 | Darlington | Rochdale |
| | Smith | Report | | Stadium: Spotland Stadium; Attendance: 4633 |

| 30 August 1933 2 | Hartlepools United | 2–1 | Rochdale | Hartlepool |
| | Hardy; Wigham | Report | Smith | Stadium: Victoria Park; Attendance: 4580 |

| 2 September 1933 3 | Gateshead | 2–1 | Rochdale | Gateshead |
| | Temple | Report | Smith | Stadium: Redheugh Park; Attendance: 4226 |

| 5 September 1933 4 | Rochdale | 3–0 | Hartlepools United | Rochdale |
| | Rigby; Weldon; Murfin | Report | | Stadium: Spotland Stadium; Attendance: 4766 |

| 9 September 1933 5 | Rochdale | 0–1 | Accrington Stanley | Rochdale |
| | | Report | Watson | Stadium: Spotland Stadium; Attendance: 7437 |

| 16 September 1933 6 | Chesterfield | 3–0 | Rochdale | Chesterfield |
| | Bedford (pen.); Cook | Report | | Stadium: Saltergate Recreation Ground; Attendance: 9969 |

| 23 September 1933 7 | Rochdale | 2–0 | Crewe Alexandra | Rochdale |
| | Weldon; Collins | Report | | Stadium: Spotland Stadium; Attendance: 5621 |

| 30 September 1933 8 | Rochdale | 1–0 | Tranmere Rovers | Rochdale |
| | Weldon | Report | | Stadium: Spotland Stadium; Attendance: 5229 |

| 7 October 1933 9 | Barnsley | 4–1 | Rochdale | Barnsley |
| | Blight; Andrews; Spence | Report | Murfin | Stadium: Oakwell; Attendance: 8970 |

| 14 October 1933 10 | Rochdale | 2–2 | Mansfield Town | Rochdale |
| | Murfin; Smith | Report | Butler; Methven | Stadium: Spotland Stadium; Attendance: 5334 |

| 21 October 1933 11 | New Brighton | 0–2 | Rochdale | New Brighton |
| | | Report | Murfin; Smith | Stadium: Sandheys Park; Attendance: 4450 |

| 28 October 1933 12 | Rochdale | 0–2 | Rotherham United | Rochdale |
| | | Report | Wright | Stadium: Spotland Stadium; Attendance: 4322 |

| 4 November 1933 13 | Walsall | 2–0 | Rochdale | Walsall |
| | Sheppard; Alsop | Report | | Stadium: Fellows Park; Attendance: 5567 |

| 11 November 1933 Abd | Rochdale | 1 a 2 | York City | Rochdale |
| | Robson | | Goal | Stadium: Spotland Stadium |

| 18 November 1933 14 | Chester | 7–1 | Rochdale | Chester |
| | Armes; McLachlan; Mantle | Report | Fitton | Stadium: Sealand Road; Attendance: 4477 |

| 2 December 1933 15 | Barrow | 5–3 | Rochdale | Barrow-in-Furness |
| | Shankly; Parker; Foster | Report | Collins; Robson; Benton | Stadium: Holker Street; Attendance: 3736 |

| 9 December 1933 16 | Rochdale | 3–1 | Barnsley | Rochdale |
| | Fitton; Robson; Benton | Report | Goal | Stadium: Spotland Stadium; Attendance: 2641 |

| 16 December 1933 17 | Stockport County | 4–1 | Rochdale | Stockport |
| | Stevenson; Foulkes; Lythgoe | Report | Robson | Stadium: Edgeley Park; Attendance: 3790 |

| 23 December 1933 18 | Rochdale | 1–2 | Halifax Town | Rochdale |
| | Benton | Report | Davies; Chambers | Stadium: Spotland Stadium; Attendance: 3258 |

| 25 December 1933 19 | Southport | 3–0 | Rochdale | Southport |
| | Diamond | Report | | Stadium: Haig Avenue; Attendance: 4956 |

| 26 December 1933 20 | Rochdale | 3–3 | Southport | Rochdale |
| | Fitton; Gordon | Report | Diamond; Holmes; Baldwin | Stadium: Spotland Stadium; Attendance: 3944 |

| 30 December 1933 21 | Darlington | 1–1 | Rochdale | Darlington |
| | Shepherd (o.g.) | Report | Collins | Stadium: Feethams; Attendance: 3770 |

| 6 January 1934 22 | Rochdale | 2–0 | Gateshead | Rochdale |
| | Collins; Wheelhouse | Report | | Stadium: Spotland Stadium; Attendance: 3220 |

| 13 January 1934 23 | Rochdale | 0–2 | Doncaster Rovers | Rochdale |
| | | Report | Dodd | Stadium: Spotland Stadium; Attendance: 3186 |

| 20 January 1934 24 | Accrington Stanley | 1–3 | Rochdale | Accrington |
| | Kelly | Report | Collins; Rigby; Weldon | Stadium: Peel Park; Attendance: 2851 |

| 27 January 1934 25 | Rochdale | 0–1 | Chesterfield | Rochdale |
| | Buckley (red card) | Report | Cook; Malam (red card) | Stadium: Spotland Stadium; Attendance: 4151 |

| 3 February 1934 26 | Crewe Alexandra | 4–1 | Rochdale | Crewe |
| | Deacon; Weale; Cull; Swindells | Report | Robson | Stadium: Gresty Road; Attendance: 2766 |

| 6 February 1934 27 | Rochdale | 0–1 | Carlisle United | Rochdale |
| | | Report | Dougal | Stadium: Spotland Stadium; Attendance: 1261 |

| 10 February 1934 28 | Tranmere Rovers | 4–0 | Rochdale | Birkenhead |
| | Hunt; Urmson; Bell | Report | | Stadium: Prenton Park; Attendance: 3612 |

| 20 February 1934 29 | Rochdale | 3–6 | York City | Rochdale |
| | Robson | Report | Dando; Hathway; Ivory; Wilcockson | Stadium: Spotland Stadium; Attendance: 800 |

| 24 February 1934 30 | Mansfield Town | 5–0 | Rochdale | Mansfield |
| | Johnson; Bytheway; Munnings | Report | | Stadium: Field Mill; Attendance: 4502 |

| 3 March 1934 31 | Rochdale | 1–1 | New Brighton | Rochdale |
| | Fitton | Report | Davis | Stadium: Spotland Stadium; Attendance: 2534 |

| 10 March 1934 32 | Rotherham United | 4–0 | Rochdale | Rotherham |
| | Hicks; Briggs; Wright | Report | | Stadium: Millmoor; Attendance: 2227 |

| 17 March 1934 33 | Rochdale | 3–3 | Walsall | Rochdale |
| | Weldon (pen.) | Report | Alsop; Leslie; Sheppard | Stadium: Spotland Stadium; Attendance: 2108 |

| 24 March 1934 34 | York City | 6–1 | Rochdale | York |
| | Hathway; Dando; Lax | Report | Murfin | Stadium: Bootham Crescent; Attendance: 3382 |

| 30 March 1934 35 | Rochdale | 1–2 | Wrexham | Rochdale |
| | Buckley | Report | Waller; Bamford | Stadium: Spotland Stadium; Attendance: 3052 |

| 31 March 1934 36 | Rochdale | 6–0 | Chester | Rochdale |
| | Smith; Wheelhouse; Fitton; Robson | Report | | Stadium: Spotland Stadium; Attendance: 2492 |

| 2 April 1934 37 | Wrexham | 4–1 | Rochdale | Wrexham |
| | Waller; Bryant; Frewin | Report | Robson | Stadium: Racecourse Ground; Attendance: 5061 |

| 7 April 1934 38 | Doncaster Rovers | 5–0 | Rochdale | Doncaster |
| | Turner; Dodd; Flowers | Report | | Stadium: Belle Vue; Attendance: 4873 |

| 14 April 1934 39 | Rochdale | 1–2 | Barrow | Rochdale |
| | Robson | Report | Shankly; Foster (pen.) | Stadium: Spotland Stadium; Attendance: 2298 |

| 21 April 1934 40 | Carlisle United | 3–0 | Rochdale | Carlisle |
| | Ferguson; Slinger | Report | | Stadium: Brunton Park; Attendance: 2762 |

| 28 April 1934 41 | Rochdale | 1–1 | Stockport County | Rochdale |
| | Murfin | Report | Stevenson | Stadium: Spotland Stadium; Attendance: 7544 |

| 5 May 1934 42 | Halifax Town | 4–2 | Rochdale | Halifax |
| | Tunstall; Chambers; Hall | Report | Murfin; Collins | Stadium: The Shay; Attendance: 3434 |

=== FA Cup ===
| 25 November 1933 1 | Sutton Town | 2–1 | Rochdale | Sutton-in-Ashfield |
| | Egan; Newbold | Report | Rigby | Stadium: Priestsic Road; Attendance: 4946 |

=== Third Division North Cup ===
| 22 January 1934 1 | Rochdale | 2–4 | Stockport County | Rochdale |
| | Collins | | Lythgoe; Stevenson; Foulkes | Stadium: Spotland Stadium |

=== Lancashire Cup ===
| 26 September 1933 1 | Rochdale | 1–2 | Bury | Rochdale |
| | Smith | | Goal | Stadium: Spotland Stadium; Attendance: 2500 |

=== Manchester Cup ===
| 28 February 1934 3 | Manchester United | 9–0 | Rochdale | Manchester |
| | Goal | | | Stadium: Old Trafford |
