= 1932–33 Rochdale A.F.C. season =

English football club season

Rochdale
1932–33 season
- Manager: Herbert Hopkinson
- Stadium: Spotland Stadium
- Football League Third Division North: 18th
- FA Cup: 1st Round
- Top goalscorer: League: George Snow; Bill Watson (12); All: George Snow; Bill Watson (12)

The 1932–33 season was Rochdale A.F.C.'s 26th in existence and their 12th in the Football League Third Division North.

== Squad Statistics ==
=== Appearances and goals ===
No.	Pos	Nat	Player	Total		Division 3 North		FA Cup	
No.	Pos	Nat	Player	Apps	Goals	Apps	Goals	Apps	Goals
	GK	(England) ENG	Lewis Caunce	19	0	18	0	1	0
	DF	(England) ENG	Jimmy Hamilton	38	0	38	0	0	0
	DF	(England) ENG	Ben Wheelhouse	40	0	39	0	1	0
	MF	(England) ENG	Jack Gordon	33	0	32	0	1	0
	MF	(England) ENG	Harry Nuttall	36	0	35	0	1	0
	MF	(England) ENG	Billy Benton	43	5	42	5	1	0
	MF	(England) ENG	Sydney Bell	2	0	2	0	0	0
	FW	(England) ENG	Tom Watson	7	6	7	6	0	0
	FW	(England) ENG	Robert Rowe	1	0	1	0	0	0
	FW	(England) ENG	George Snow	42	12	41	12	1	0
	FW	(England) ENG	Bill Watson	40	12	39	12	1	0
	MF	(England) ENG	Will Rigby	14	3	14	3	0	0
	FW	(England) ENG	Thomas Hill	7	0	7	0	0	0
	DF	(England) ENG	Bill Armstrong	10	0	10	0	0	0
	MF	(England) ENG	Bernard Lowery	1	0	1	0	0	0
	FW	(England) ENG	Bill Gardner	1	0	1	0	0	0
	FW	(England) ENG	George Beel	21	8	20	8	1	0
	MF	(Scotland) SCO	Joe McAleer	15	1	15	1	0	0
	MF	(Scotland) SCO	David Bain	21	5	20	5	1	0
	MF	(England) ENG	Joseph Shonakan	28	2	27	2	1	0
	FW	(Scotland) SCO	Tim Williamson	8	2	7	2	1	0
	DF	(England) ENG	William Gregson	1	0	1	0	0	0
	GK	(England) ENG	Bert Welch	24	0	24	0	0	0
	DF		Harry Sharples	2	0	2	0	0	0
	FW	(England) ENG	Arthur Worrall	1	0	1	0	0	0
	FW	(Wales) WAL	Ralph Williams	8	1	8	1	0	0
	DF	(Wales) WAL	Stan Bowsher	10	0	10	0	0	0
	MF	(England) ENG	Thomas Shepherd	0	0	0	0	0	0

Squad Statistics (Non-competitive)

=== Appearances and goals (non-competitive) ===
No.	Pos	Nat	Player	Total		Lancashire Cup		Manchester Cup	
No.	Pos	Nat	Player	Apps	Goals	Apps	Goals	Apps	Goals
	GK	(England) ENG	Lewis Caunce	2	0	2	0	0	0
	DF	(England) ENG	Jimmy Hamilton	3	0	2	0	1	0
	DF	(England) ENG	Ben Wheelhouse	3	0	2	0	1	0
	MF	(England) ENG	Jack Gordon	3	0	2	0	1	0
	MF	(England) ENG	Harry Nuttall	1	0	1	0	0	0
	MF	(England) ENG	Billy Benton	4	2	2	0	2	2
	MF	(England) ENG	Sydney Bell	0	0	0	0	0	0
	FW	(England) ENG	Tom Watson	2	0	2	0	0	0
	FW	(England) ENG	Robert Rowe	1	0	0	0	1	0
	FW	(England) ENG	George Snow	4	3	2	2	2	1
	FW	(England) ENG	Bill Watson	4	1	2	1	2	0
	MF	(England) ENG	Will Rigby	1	0	1	0	0	0
	FW	(England) ENG	Thomas Hill	0	0	0	0	0	0
	DF	(England) ENG	Bill Armstrong	2	0	1	0	1	0
	MF	(England) ENG	Bernard Lowery	0	0	0	0	0	0
	FW	(England) ENG	Bill Gardner	0	0	0	0	0	0
	FW	(England) ENG	George Beel	2	1	2	1	0	0
	MF	(Scotland) SCO	Joe McAleer	2	2	0	0	2	2
	MF	(Scotland) SCO	David Bain	1	0	0	0	1	0
	MF	(England) ENG	Joseph Shonakan	2	0	0	0	2	0
	FW	(Scotland) SCO	Tim Williamson	0	0	0	0	0	0
	DF	(England) ENG	William Gregson	2	0	0	0	2	0
	GK	(England) ENG	Bert Welch	2	0	0	0	2	0
	DF		Harry Sharples	0	0	0	0	0	0
	FW	(England) ENG	Arthur Worrall	1	0	0	0	1	0
	FW	(Wales) WAL	Ralph Williams	0	0	0	0	0	0
	DF	(Wales) WAL	Stan Bowsher	1	0	0	0	1	0
	MF	(England) ENG	Thomas Shepherd	1	0	0	0	1	0

== Final league table ==
Pos	Team	Pld	W	D	L	GF	GA	GAv	Pts
16	Mansfield Town	42	14	7	21	84	100	0.840	35
17	Rotherham United	42	14	6	22	60	84	0.714	34
18	Rochdale	42	13	7	22	58	80	0.725	33
19	Carlisle United	42	13	7	22	51	75	0.680	33
20	York City	42	13	6	23	72	92	0.783	32

Source: rsssf.com

== Competitions ==
=== Football League Third Division North ===
27 August 1932 1	Rochdale	0–1	Carlisle United	Rochdale
		Report	White	Stadium: Spotland Stadium; Attendance: 4898

29 August 1932 2	Barrow	1–1	Rochdale	Barrow-in-Furness
	Millar	Report	Watson	Stadium: Holker Street; Attendance: 4786

3 September 1932 3	York City	2–6	Rochdale	York
	Fenoughty; Mitchell	Report	Watson; Snow	Stadium: Bootham Crescent; Attendance: 4363

6 September 1932 4	Rochdale	0–0	Barrow	Rochdale
		Report		Stadium: Spotland Stadium; Attendance: 4441

10 September 1932 5	Rochdale	1–4	Crewe Alexandra	Rochdale
	Watson	Report	Murray; Weale; McConnell	Stadium: Spotland Stadium; Attendance: 6475

17 September 1932 6	Doncaster Rovers	1–0	Rochdale	Doncaster
	Emery	Report		Stadium: Belle Vue; Attendance: 4094

24 September 1932 7	Southport	2–0	Rochdale	Southport
	Williams; Appleby	Report		Stadium: Haig Avenue; Attendance: 5928

1 October 1932 8	Rochdale	2–1	Mansfield Town	Rochdale
	Bain	Report	Johnson	Stadium: Spotland Stadium; Attendance: 5945

8 October 1932 9	Rotherham United	2–0	Rochdale	Rotherham
	Staniforth; Pynegar	Report		Stadium: Millmoor; Attendance: 2555

15 October 1932 10	Rochdale	2–0	Accrington Stanley	Rochdale
	Watson; Beel	Report		Stadium: Spotland Stadium; Attendance: 7041

22 October 1932 11	Rochdale	1–1	Darlington	Rochdale
	Beel	Report	Waugh	Stadium: Spotland Stadium; Attendance: 5822

29 October 1932 12	Stockport County	2–3	Rochdale	Stockport
	Humpish; Taylor	Report	Bain; Beel	Stadium: Edgeley Park; Attendance: 4292

5 November 1932 13	Rochdale	1–0	Gateshead	Rochdale
	Bain	Report		Stadium: Spotland Stadium; Attendance: 8650

12 November 1932 14	Walsall	2–1	Rochdale	Walsall
	Bird (pen.)	Report	Beel	Stadium: Fellows Park; Attendance: 5068

19 November 1932 15	Rochdale	3–1	Wrexham	Rochdale
	Watson; Williamson	Report	Frewin	Stadium: Spotland Stadium; Attendance: 7897

3 December 1932 16	Rochdale	1–0	Halifax Town	Rochdale
	Benton (pen.)	Report		Stadium: Spotland Stadium; Attendance: 3608

10 December 1932 17	Mansfield Town	4–1	Rochdale	Mansfield
	Bowater; Readman; Prior	Report	Watson	Stadium: Field Mill; Attendance: 4441

17 December 1932 18	Rochdale	2–3	Barnsley	Rochdale
	Watson; Snow	Report	Owencroft; Andrews	Stadium: Spotland Stadium; Attendance: 4071

24 December 1932 19	Hull City	1–1	Rochdale	Hull
	Wainscoat	Report	Watson	Stadium: Anlaby Road; Attendance: 10881

26 December 1932 20	New Brighton	0–3	Rochdale	New Brighton
		Report	Watson; Benton (pen.); Shonakan	Stadium: Sandheys Park; Attendance: 3738

27 December 1932 21	Rochdale	1–0	New Brighton	Rochdale
	McAleer	Report		Stadium: Spotland Stadium; Attendance: 6055

31 December 1932 22	Carlisle United	2–2	Rochdale	Carlisle
	Slinger	Report	Watson	Stadium: Brunton Park; Attendance: 4093

2 January 1933 23	Hartlepools United	3–0	Rochdale	Hartlepool
	Pedwell; Wigham; Hewitt	Report		Stadium: Victoria Park; Attendance: 3359

7 January 1933 24	Rochdale	1–4	York City	Rochdale
	Beel	Report	Baines; Spooner; Fenoughty	Stadium: Spotland Stadium; Attendance: 3968

18 January 1933 25	Tranmere Rovers	3–1	Rochdale	Birkenhead
	Watts; Whitehurst; Adams	Report	Beel	Stadium: Prenton Park; Attendance: 1719

21 January 1933 26	Crewe Alexandra	3–1	Rochdale	Crewe
	McConnell; Swindells	Report	Watson	Stadium: Gresty Road; Attendance: 3287

28 January 1933 27	Rochdale	2–3	Doncaster Rovers	Rochdale
	Snow; Shonakan	Report	Waterston; Armstrong (o.g.)	Stadium: Spotland Stadium; Attendance: 2390

4 February 1933 28	Rochdale	1–3	Southport	Rochdale
	Watson	Report	Sellars; Appleby	Stadium: Spotland Stadium; Attendance: 3349

18 February 1933 29	Rochdale	2–2	Rotherham United	Rochdale
	Snow; Beel	Report	Briggs; Wright	Stadium: Spotland Stadium; Attendance: 1932

4 March 1933 30	Darlington	5–1	Rochdale	Darlington
	Brown; Coates; Cook	Report	Watson	Stadium: Feethams; Attendance: 2533

11 March 1933 31	Rochdale	0–2	Stockport County	Rochdale
		Report	Foulkes; Lythgoe	Stadium: Spotland Stadium; Attendance: 4151

18 March 1933 32	Gateshead	3–0	Rochdale	Gateshead
	Ranson; Atkin	Report		Stadium: Redheugh Park; Attendance: 2797

25 March 1933 33	Rochdale	1–1	Walsall	Rochdale
	Benton	Report	Alsop	Stadium: Spotland Stadium; Attendance: 2979

1 April 1933 34	Wrexham	4–1	Rochdale	Wrexham
	Bains; Spooner; Fenoughty	Report	Snow	Stadium: Racecourse Ground; Attendance: 5505

8 April 1933 35	Rochdale	0–3	Tranmere Rovers	Rochdale
		Report	Tong; Bell	Stadium: Spotland Stadium; Attendance: 3007

14 April 1933 36	Chester	2–0	Rochdale	Chester
	Cresswell; Hedley	Report		Stadium: Sealand Road; Attendance: 9870

15 April 1933 37	Halifax Town	2–0	Rochdale	Halifax
	Brown; Chambers	Report		Stadium: The Shay; Attendance: 4032

17 April 1933 38	Rochdale	2–0	Chester	Rochdale
	Snow; Bennett (o.g.)	Report		Stadium: Spotland Stadium; Attendance: 3742

22 April 1933 39	Rochdale	6–2	Hartlepools United	Rochdale
	Snow; Rigby; Benton; Williams	Report	Hardy; Hewitt	Stadium: Spotland Stadium; Attendance: 3249

29 April 1933 40	Barnsley	3–1	Rochdale	Barnsley
	Wallbanks; Fleetwood	Report	Snow	Stadium: Oakwell; Attendance: 1931

3 May 1933 41	Accrington Stanley	0–3	Rochdale	Accrington
		Report	Watson; Bain; Rigby	Stadium: Peel Park; Attendance: 1013

6 May 1933 42	Rochdale	3–2	Hull City	Rochdale
	Benton; Snow	Report	McNaughton	Stadium: Spotland Stadium; Attendance: 4387

=== FA Cup ===
26 November 1932 1	Rochdale	0–2	Stockport County	Rochdale
		Report	Taylor; Vincent	Stadium: Spotland Stadium; Attendance: 9592

=== Lancashire Cup ===
19 September 1932 1	Rochdale	2–2	Accrington Stanley	Rochdale
	Snow; Watson		Goal	Stadium: Spotland Stadium; Attendance: 1300

5 October 1932 1 - Replay	Accrington Stanley	4–2	Rochdale	Accrington
	Goal		Snow; Beel	Stadium: Peel Park; Attendance: 1300

=== Manchester Cup ===
7 February 1933 3	Rochdale	5–3	Oldham Athletic	Rochdale
	Snow; McAleer; Benton		Goal	Stadium: Spotland Stadium

10 April 1933 SF	Manchester City	4–0	Rochdale	Manchester
	Goal			Stadium: Maine Road; Attendance: 750
