= Hathway (surname) =

Hathway is a surname. Notable people with the surname include:

- Alan Hathway (1906–1977), American writer
- Kevin Hathway, British classical percussionist and educator
- Reginald Hathway (1907–?), Welsh rugby union and rugby league footballer
- Ted Hathway, English footballer
