= Walter Buckley (footballer) =

English footballer (1906–1985)

Personal information
- Full name: Walter Buckley
- Date of birth: 30 April 1906
- Place of birth: Ecclesall, Sheffield, England
- Date of death: December 1985 (aged 79)
- Place of death: Norwich, England
- Height: 5 ft 7 in (1.70 m)
- Positions: Left half; centre half

Senior career*
Years	Team	Apps	(Gls)
- Birley Carr Institute
1923–1926	Arsenal	0	(0)
1926	Bournemouth & Boscombe Athletic	0	(0)
1926–1927	Mansfield Town		
1927–1930	Bradford Park Avenue	5	(0)
1930–1933	Lincoln City	81	(1)
1933–1936	Rochdale	108	(2)
1936–194?	Runcorn		

International career
1920	England schoolboys	2	(0)
- * Club domestic league appearances and goals

Walter Buckley (30 April 1906 – December 1985) was an English professional footballer who made nearly 200 appearances in the Football League playing for Bradford Park Avenue, Lincoln City and Rochdale. He played primarily as a left half or centre half. He was also on the books of Arsenal and Bournemouth & Boscombe Athletic without playing league football for either, and played non-league football for Birley Carr Institute, Mansfield Town and Runcorn. He was an England schoolboy international.

== Personal life ==
Buckley was born in 1906 in Ecclesall, Sheffield, the son of Henry Buckley, a pocket knife grinder for a manufacturer of cutlery, and his wife Rose Alice. He was raised in the Hillsborough district, and attended Hillsborough Council School. He married Hilda Mary Adwick at Wadsley Church, Sheffield, in June 1928. The 1939 Register finds Buckley and his wife living in Runcorn, Cheshire; he was working as a maintenance labourer at a tannery, and she as a bookkeeper and typist.

Buckley died in Norwich, Norfolk, in December 1985 at the age of 79.

== Football career ==
Buckley played for and captained the Sheffield Schools football team, and in 1920 was selected at left half for the England Schoolboys team to face their Welsh and Scottish counterparts. After leaving school, Buckley played football for Birley Carr Institute, mainly at right half or centre half, and at "barely 17 years old" had impressed enough during a week's trial to be signed by Football League First Division club Arsenal. According to the Athletic News, "great store [was] being placed on [his] acquisition". He played regularly for Arsenal's reserve team in the London Combination, and was twice retained for a further season, but his only first-team appearance was in a friendly match during the 1925–26 season, and he was given a free transfer at the end of that season.

Buckley spent a trial period with Bournemouth & Boscombe Athletic, under the management of Leslie Knighton, who had signed him for Arsenal, but despite that club's desire to retain his services, he wanted to return nearer home. He joined Mansfield Town, the Midland League runners-up who had joined the Midland Combination, primarily a reserve league for Football League clubs, in the hope of a better class of football. He helped them finish as runners-up, reach the second round of the FA Cup, and win the Nottinghamshire Senior Cup, before signing for Bradford (Park Avenue) of the Football League Third Division North in May 1927. The Yorkshire Post reported that he "seemed slow at times" during pre-season, and his Football League debut did not take place until 2 March 1929, by which time Bradford were in the Second Division. He was one of several inexperienced players included in the team to face Reading; they won 1–0, and according to the Leeds Mercury, "The principal cause for Bradford's superiority – the margin of their victory did not accurately represent this – was the work of their half backs (Buckley, Matthews and Godfrey). Once or twice, some of the Reading players tried to overawe the two new men by robust tackling, but Buckley and Godfrey never faltered. Indeed, they frequently got the better of the argument." Buckley kept his place for the next four matches but, despite remaining with the club for a further season, they were his last.

He joined Lincoln City of the Third Division North ahead of the 1930–31 season, went straight into the starting eleven, and remained in it. He scored his first Football League goal to open the scoring 20 minutes into a 3–0 win against Walsall on 12 September: after his free kick was blocked, "he recovered possession and fired in from a crowd of players, the ball twisting over the goal-line a second before Riley dashed up to make sure." He was rested for a couple of matches in mid-December, apart from which he was ever-present as Lincoln City led the table for much of the season before dropping to second place in the last three games. He continued ever-present until 9 January 1932, when he injured a leg during the second half of a match against Rochdale, and played on at outside left despite the pain. The leg was X-rayed afterwards and revealed a broken fibula. He returned to reserve-team football after two months out, and resumed first-team duties after another month, playing the last five matches of the season as Lincoln won the Third Division North title and gained promotion to the Second Division. He was retained for 1932–33, and began the season in the league eleven. He missed two games in September after the taxi in which he and four team-mates were travelling to Swansea Town's ground was in collision with a bus, "broken glass inflicting deep cuts immediately above and below the left eyelid. Four stitches [were] inserted in each wound." George Whyte took over the left-half position in December, and Buckley played just twice more that season. He was listed as open to transfer, and signed for Rochdale in July 1933.

He was a regular in Rochdale's league team throughout the three seasons he spent at the club. In January 1934, he and Chesterfield's Albert Malam were sent off for a last-minute "argument" in which fists were raised. The Sheffield Independent thought the incident regrettable but not worthy of "such drastic action"; both men were suspended for a month. Rochdale finished bottom of the Third Division North, and with their Football League status uncertain, released all but three players, of whom Buckley was one. Their application for re-election was successful, and Buckley made 41 appearances in all competitions, a good half of which were in the unaccustomed position of full back. He played 38 games in 1935–36, mostly at left half or centre half, as Rochdale changed the makeup of their team on a regular basis, "sometimes of necessity and more often by choice", and still finished in 20th place for the second season running.

Buckley signed for Runcorn of the Cheshire County League in August 1936. During the opening match of the season, against Crewe Alexandra Reserves, Buckley came off worse in a clash of heads. He left the field, returning in the second half with a bandage covering several stitches in his forehead and only fit to play on the wing. He missed the next couple of weeks, but played regularly thereafter as Runcorn won an unprecedented Cheshire League–Cheshire League Cup double. He continued as a regular in the side, helping them beat Third Division club Aldershot on the way to the third round of the FA Cup in 1938–39. Runcorn were drawn to play cup-holders Preston North End, but Buckley was left out: according to the Lancashire Daily Post, he "[had] been one of the most consistent members of the team and his omission has created a little surprise". He remained with the club after competitive football was suspended for the duration of the Second World War, and still treated it as competitive: towards the end of the 1939–40 season, Runcorn's match against Witton Albion was abandoned with two minutes left when Buckley and an opponent refused to leave the field when sent off by the referee.

== Career statistics ==
Appearances and goals by club, season and competition
Club	Season	League			FA Cup		Other		Total	
Club	Season	Division	Apps	Goals	Apps	Goals	Apps	Goals	Apps	Goals
Bradford (Park Avenue)	1927–28	Third Division North	0	0	0	0	—		0	0
Bradford (Park Avenue)	1928–29	Second Division	5	0	0	0	—		5	0
Bradford (Park Avenue)	1929–30	Second Division	0	0	0	0	—		0	0
Bradford (Park Avenue)	Total		5	0	0	0	—		5	0
Lincoln City	1930–31	Third Division North	40	0	2	0	—		42	0
Lincoln City	1931–32	Third Division North	26	1	3	0	2 (Note: Appearance(s) in Third Division North Cup)	0	31	1
Lincoln City	1932–33	Second Division	15	0	1	0	0	0	16	0
Lincoln City	Total		81	1	6	0	2	0	89	1
Rochdale	1933–34	Third Division North	34	1	1	0	1	0	36	1
Rochdale	1934–35	Third Division North	37	0	1	0	3	0	41	0
Rochdale	1935–36	Third Division North	37	1	0	0	1	0	38	1
Rochdale	Total		108	2	2	0	5	0	115	2
Career total			194	3	8	0	7	0	209	3

== Sources ==
- Phillipps, Steven (2013). Rochdale AFC: A Who's Who, 1907 to 1939. Nottingham: Tony Brown. ISBN 978-1-905891-64-1.
