= Colin Cook (footballer) =

English footballer (1909–1976)

Personal information
- Full name: Colin Cook
- Date of birth: 8 January 1909
- Place of birth: North Shields, England
- Date of death: 15 September 1976 (aged 67)
- Place of death: North Shields, England
- Height: 5 ft 10 in (1.78 m)
- Position: Centre forward

Youth career
- 192?–1926: Wesleyan Memorial

Senior career*
Years	Team	Apps	(Gls)
1926–1927	Preston Colliery		
1927	Percy Main Amateurs		
1927–1929	South Shields	9	(3)
1929–1931	North Shields		
1931	Bradford City	1	(0)
1931–1932	Crook Town		(48)
1932–1934	Chesterfield	50	(38)
1934–1936	Luton Town	8	(5)
1936–1938	Northampton Town	12	(3)
1938–1939	Horden Colliery Welfare		
1939–19??	Blyth Spartans		
- * Club domestic league appearances and goals

Colin Cook (8 January 1909 – 15 September 1976) was an English professional footballer who played as a centre forward in the Football League for South Shields, Bradford City, Chesterfield, Luton Town and Northampton Town. He also played non-league football for Preston Colliery, Percy Main Amateurs, North Shields, Crook Town, Horden Colliery Welfare and Blyth Spartans.

== Personal life ==
Cook was born in 1909 in North Shields, which was then in Northumberland. He was the son of Edward Pearson Cook, a loam moulder in an iron foundry, and his wife Mary née Webster. Edward Cook went on to run a newsagent's and hairdresser's in North Shields, and was actively involved in the administration of sport locally, as secretary and a director of North Shields F.C. in its early years and an official of bowls and cricket clubs. The 1939 Register finds Colin Cook living at his parents' home in North Shields and working as a joiner in a ship repair yard. He married Thora Potts in 1947, and took over his father's newsagent's shop, where he was still working until at least 1961. Cook died in North Shields in 1976 at the age of 67.

== Football career ==
As a youth, Cook played football for Wesleyan Memorial of the North Shields Churches' League; the Shields Daily News of January 1924 wrote that despite being "still a schoolboy, he shows a rare understanding of the game". He moved into senior football with North-Eastern League club Preston Colliery, where he was a regular for the reserve team in the Northern Amateur League and made his first-team debut towards the end of the 1926–27 season. In September 1927, he signed for Northern Amateur League club Percy Main Amateurs, but not for long. He scored four first-half goals in a 7–1 win against Heaton Stannington on 8 October, played on trial for South Shields' reserves the following Saturday, and scored twice in a 3–1 win. "Satisfied that they [had] made a valuable 'capture'", the Second Division club's directors signed him initially on amateur forms, and he turned professional a few weeks later.

With 20 goals for South Shields Reserves in his first three months, Cook got his chance in the first team in place of the injured Jack Smith for the visit of Hull City on 22 February 1928: he scored the only goal of the match, placing the ball well wide of Hull City's goalkeeper. He kept his place for three more matches, without scoring, and then Dick Parker came back into the side for the rest of the season, at the end of which South Shields were relegated to the Third Division North. His 1928–29 season proceeded in similar fashion. Free-scoring in the reserves, he had a four-match run in the League team over the Christmas period in the absence of Rance Maycock, scored twice in a 3–1 win against Ashington, and played only once more. He was included on the retained list, and signed on for another season, but did not play, and at the end of September was transferred to North Shields, for which he had played under its former name of Preston Colliery.

He was equally prolific in North-Eastern League football for North Shields, and finished the 1930–31 season as their top scorer with 33 league goals. South Shields, who had retained his Football League registration, gave him a free transfer at the end of that season, and he signed for Second Division club Bradford City on a short-term deal. He appeared once for the League side, in a defeat at home to Notts County, did not impress, and returned to the north-east. The Shields Daily News reported the possibility of his rejoining North Shields, but suggested his less than happy relationship with the supporters might lead him to sign elsewhere. He resumed his North-Eastern League career, not with North Shields but with Crook Town. After four games produced eleven goals, he was linked with an imminent move to either Everton or Aston Villa, No move took place, but rumours continued throughout the season as Cook helped Crook reach the third round of the 1931–32 FA Cup, scored his 50th goal for the club by mid-March, and ended up with 72, of which 48 were in league matches. After a match in which Crook beat North Shields 5–0 and Cook scored a hat-trick, the Shields Daily News reporter attributed the improvement to confidence:

The difference between the Shields Cook and the Crook Cook is that the latter has confidence, which means that he is about twice as good. His confidence is shown in the way he grimly and strongly thrusts for goal when in possession, and once through, his deadly shooting completes the effort. Belief in his own scoring powers also makes him "quicker on the draw". Except for these very important points there is no essential difference.

Cook was included on Crook's retained list, but did not re-sign. Instead, he returned to the Second Division with Chesterfield. He opened his Chesterfield career with the reserves in a 6–0 win against Rotherham United's reserves in the opening fixture of the 1932–33 Midland League season; he scored five himself and "unselfishly passed to Beedall" for the other. He continued to score freely, and made his first-team debut in 15 October at home to Bury in a 3–1 defeat that left his team bottom of the table. Cook scored Chesterfield's goal, and the Sheffield Daily Telegraph reporter thought him worth his place: "forceful, with an eye for an opening, he gave his passes intelligently and with accuracy." He kept his place for and scored in the next match, an even heavier defeat, and did not reappear for another couple of months. He scored seven goals in four league matches over Christmas and the new year, and contributed two goals, one in the original tie, one in the replay, as Chesterfield eliminated First Division Sheffield Wednesday from the 1932–33 FA Cup. Cook's goalscoring tailed off, at least in part due to increased attention from opposing defenders, but, as the Lancashire Daily Post pointed out, that gave more freedom of movement to his team-mates. He finished the season with 10 goals from 13 Second Division matches and 27 goals from just 22 Midland League matches for the reserves.

Following their relegation to the Third Division North, Chesterfield allowed Cook a free transfer, and his last Midland League appearance, in which he scored a hat-trick, was watched by both Herbert Chapman, manager of Arsenal, and by a director of Burnley. However, he agreed to sign on for another season at the club where he was popular with the supporters, and began with a hat-trick in the opening fixture. Cook's two goals in the sixth match, a 3–0 win against Rochdale, took him to double figures and Chesterfield to the top of the table, and the Sunday People noted that those supporters who had criticised the club for not selecting him enough the previous season might have had a point. With 13 matches gone, he had 14 goals and Chesterfield had set a club record of ten consecutive league wins. His goalscoring continued, though at a lesser rate, and with three matches remaining of the league season, Chesterfield were still top of the table, but only one point ahead of Barnsley. The Halifax Courier's pseudonymous "The Scout" commented that Barnsley's strength came from their consistent team selection – "if a certain eleven has been fit that eleven has been an automatic choice" – while Chesterfield dropped both Cook and the in-demand Albert Malam, which the writer thought indicated they were becoming "rattled". From those last three games, Barnsley took five points and Chesterfield three, so Barnsley were promoted. Cook had scored 28 league goals from his 37 appearances, and reportedly within half-an-hour of being made available on a free transfer, signed for Luton Town of the Third Division South.

He made his Luton debut in the third match of the 1934–35 season, and scored in a 4–0 win against Cardiff City in the fourth. In the next, Luton lost 2–1 at home to Charlton Athletic, but Cook was deprived of a headed goal when the ball appeared well over the line when a defender cleared it; the referee disagreed. Away to Crystal Palace, Cook had the best chance of the match: he took advantage of a defensive error, and "might have shot from anywhere inside a range of a dozen yards, but he dribbled on until almost on top of Dunn, and then shot with all his might, and the ball struck the Palace goalkeeper in the chest and rebounded, to be booted to safety. It was a shocking miss, for a gentle tap must have scored. ... Cook was a trier, but lacked the necessary speed of foot and the quickness of thought to beat such a pivot as Wilde, and it was unfortunate that he failed to take the best opportunity of the game." That was his last appearance of the season for the first team, although he was a regular in the reserves and was one of sixteen players included on Luton's retained list. His second season was little different from his first: he played well without scoring on his first appearance – the local newspaper wrote that his "persisence and earnestness kept the Rangers' defence all hot and bothered, and if anyone deserved a goal it was he" – followed up with a hat-trick, two headers and a tap-in, in a 6–0 win against Crystal Palace, and kept his place for the next game, which was his last until the following April, when he scored again. He was again a regular in the reserve team, for which he scored freely in the London Combination. In March 1936, Luton circularised other clubs with his availability for transfer; there were no takers at that time, but at the end of the season he signed for another Southern Section club, Northampton Town.

Cook went straight into Northampton's league team. He scored his first goal in a 5–3 win at home to Aldershot on 31 August, and opened the scoring in the reverse fixture nine days later, a 2–0 win, but after two more appearances, he was dropped to the reserves where he remained for the rest of the season. In 1937–38, he had a run of five games in mid-season during which he scored once, and was put on the transfer list at the end. Reportedly tired of waiting for a league club, he returned to the North-Eastern League with champions Horden Colliery Welfare. Although they were unable to retain their title, Cook was able to help them reach the second round proper of the FA Cup for the first and only time in the club's history: they lost 3–2 to Newport County, who went on to finish top of that season's Third Division South. At the end of the season, he signed for Blyth Spartans, but his career was cut short by the outbreak of the Second World War.

== Sources ==
- Frost, Terry (1988). Bradford City A Complete Record 1903–1988. Derby: Breedon Books Sport. ISBN 0-907969-38-0.
- Thompson, George (2000). South Shields F.C.: the Football League years. Harefield: Yore. ISBN 978-1-87442-743-8.
