= George Flowers =

George Flowers may refer to:

- George Flowers (politician) (1879–1958), Australian politician
- George Flowers (footballer) (1907–1991), English footballer
- George French Flowers (1811–1872), English composer and musical theorist
