= Bibliography of the Dreyfus Affair =

This is a bibliography of works on the Dreyfus Affair.

== Primary sources ==
- 1898 (in French) Verbatim record of the trial of Émile Zola in the Assizes of the Seine and the Supreme Court.
- 1898 (in French) Enquiry of the Supreme Court (1898–1899).
- 1898 (in French) Proceedings of the Supreme Court for the revision of the Dreyfus trial.
- 1899 (in French) Verbatim record of the proceedings of Rennes Volume 1, Volume 2, Volume 3
- 1904 (in French) Memoire of Alfred Dreyfus to the Supreme Court.
- 1904 (in French) Enquiry of the Supreme Court.
- 1906 (in French) Debates of the Supreme Court.
- 1906 (in French) Decision of the Supreme Court for the verdict of the Dreyfus trial without reference to 1899.
- 2013 (in English) The Secret File, posted online by Ministry of Defence 6 March 2013 and transcription

=== Testimonials ===
- 1898 (in French) Jean Jaurès, The Evidence, Collection of Articles appearing in La Petite République – available on Wikisource
- 1898 (in French) Alfred Dreyfus, Letters of an Innocent man, Stock
- 1901 (in English) Alfred Dreyfus, Five Years of My Life, French original "Cinq années de ma vie" published in France in 1901, English translation first published in 1901, newest reprint 2019 (ISBN 978-3-945831-19-9).
- 1901 (in French) Alfred Dreyfus, Cinq années de ma vie, Eugène Fasquelle Éditeurs, Paris, 1901, reprinted 2006 (The Discovery) (ISBN 2707148067)
- Grousset, Paschal (1898). L'affaire Dreyfus et ses ressorts secrets : précis historique [The Dreyfus Affair and its secret remits: a historical summary] (in French). Paris: Société d'Éditions.
- 1899 (in French) Paschal Grousset, The Dreyfus Affair, the word of an enigma. Paris, Stock.
- 1899 (in French) Georges Clemenceau, Towards Reparation, Tresse & Stock
- 1899 (in French) Georges Clemenceau, The Iniquity, Stock
- 1903 (in French) Georges Clemenceau, The Disgrace
- 1955 (in French) Maurice Paléologue, The Dreyfus Affair and the Quai d'Orsay, Plon
- 1957 (in English) Maurice Paléologue, My Secret Diary of the Dreyfus Case 1894-1899, Secker & Warburg.
- 1978 (in French) Mathieu Dreyfus, The Affair that I have lived, Bernard Grasset, Paris. (ISBN 2-246-00668-6)
- 1991 (in French) Octave Mirbeau, The Dreyfus Affair, Librairie Séguier.
- 1993 (in French) Léon Blum, Memories of The Affair, Flammarion, Folio Histoire, (ISBN 978-2070327522)
- Zola, Emile (2006). Combat pour Dreyfus [Fight for Dreyfus] (in French). Paris: Dilecta. ISBN 9782916275048. OCLC 65405210.

== Secondary sources ==
- 1901 (in French) Joseph Reinach, History of the Dreyfus Affair, Fasquelle, 1901–1911; éd. Robert Laffont, two vol., 2006 231.
- 1961 (in French) Marcel Thomas, The Affair Without Dreyfus, Fayard – Idégraf (Geneva), 1961–1979 – 2 volumes.
- 1981 (in French) Jean-Denis Bredin, The Affair, Fayard, Paris, 1993 (1ère édition 1981) (ISBN 2-260-00346-X).
- 1986 (in English) Jean-Denis Bredin, The Affair: The Case of Alfred Dreyfus, George Braziller, New York, ISBN 0-8076-1175-1 Plunkett Lake Press Ebooks
- 2005 (in French) Vincent Duclert, Biography of Alfred Dreyfus: The Honour of a Patriot, Fayard, Paris, 2006 (ISBN 2213627959).

=== Other general works ===
- McMillan, James F. Twentieth-Century France: Politics and Society in France 1898–1991 (1992) pp. 3–12
- Sowerwine, Charles. France since 1870: Culture, Society and the Making of the Republic (2001) excerpt and text search pp. 67–72
- 1984 (in English) Michael Burns, Rural Society and French Politics, Boulangism and the Dreyfus Affair, 1886–1900 Princeton University Press.
- 1991 (in English) Alfred S. Lindemann, The Jew Accused: Three Anti-Semitic Affairs, Dreyfus, Beilis, Frank, 1894–1914 (Cambridge University Press).
- 1992 (in English) Michael Burns, Dreyfus: A Family Affair, from the French Revolution to the Holocaust, New York: Harper.
- 1998 (in English) Michael Burns, France and the Dreyfus Affair: A Documentary History (Boston: Bedford/St. Martin's)
- Cahm, Eric (1996). The Dreyfus affair in French society and politics. New York: Longman. ISBN 978-0-582-27679-6.
- 1999 (in English) Martin P. Johnson, The Dreyfus Affair: Honour and Politics in the Belle Epoque (New York: Palgrave Macmillan).
- 2006 (in English) George R. Whyte, The Accused: The Dreyfus Trilogy, Inter Nationes, ISBN 3-929979-28-4
- 2006 (in English) George R. Whyte, The Dreyfus Affair: a Chronological History, Palgrave Macmillan 2006, ISBN 978-0-230-20285-6
- 2007 (in English) Ruth Harris, The Assumptionists and the Dreyfus Affair, Past & Present (2007) 194#1 175–211. in Project MUSE
- 2010 (in English) Ruth Harris, Dreyfus: Politics, Emotion, and the Scandal of the Century (Henry Holt and Company)
- 2008 (in French) Philippe Oriol, History of the Dreyfus Affair – Vol 1 – The History of Captain Dreyfus, Stock, (ISBN 978-2-234-06080-7)
- 2009 (in English) Louis Begley, Why the Dreyfus Affair Matters (Yale University Press)
- 2010 (in English) Frederick Brown, For the Soul of France: Culture Wars in the Age of Dreyfus (Alfred A. Knopf)
- Whyte, George R. (2010). Die Dreyfus-Affäre: die Macht des Vorurteils (in German). P. Lang. ISBN 978-3-631-60218-8.
- 2012 (in English) Robert L. Fuller, The Origins of the French Nationalist Movement, 1886–1914, Jefferson, NC: McFarland.
- 2012 (in English) Piers Paul Read, The Dreyfus Affair, Bloomsbury, London
- 2024 (in English) Maurice Samuels, Alfred Dreyfus: The Man at the Center of the Affair (Yale University Press)

=== In French ===
- 1961 (in French) Pierre Miquel, The Dreyfus Affair, University of France Press – PUF – coll. "What do I know?", réprinted 2003 (ISBN 2130532268)
- 1989 (in French) Pierre Miquel, The Third Republic, Fayard
- 1986 (in French) Michel Winock, The Fever of France: The Great Political Crises. 1871–1968, Points Seuil, (ISBN 2020098318)
- 1999 (in French) Michel Winock, The School of Intellectuals, Le Seuil, coll. Points
- 1994 (in French) Pierre Birnbaum, The Dreyfus Affair: The Republic in Peril, Gallimard, coll. "Discoveries", (ISBN 978-2070532773).
- 1994 (in French) Pierre Birnbaum, The France of the Dreyfus Affair, Gallimard, Paris
- 1998 (in French) Pierre Birnbaum, Was the French Army Antisemitic?, pp. 70–82 in Michel Winock: The Dreyfus Affair, Editions du Seuil, Paris, ISBN 2-02-032848-8
- 1994 (in French) Michael Burns, Histoire d'une famille française, les Dreyfus, Fayard, 1994 (ISBN 978-2213031323)
- 1994 (in French) Michel Drouin (dir.), The Dreyfus Affair Dictionary, Flammarion, reprinted 2006 (ISBN 2082105474).
- 1994 (in French) Vincent Duclert, The Dreyfus Affair, The Discovery, reprinted 2006 (ISBN 2707147931).
- 2006 (in French) Vincent Duclert, Dreyfus is Innocent: History of an Affair of State, Larousse, (ISBN 203582639X)
- 2006 (in French) Vincent Duclert, Alfred Dreyfus, Librairie Artheme Fayard, ISBN 2-213-62795-9
- 2010 (in French) Vincent Duclert, The Dreyfus Affair: When Justice Enlightens the Republic, Private
- 2000 (in French) Francis Démier, The France of the Nineteenth Century, Seuil, coll. "Points in History".
- 2006 (in French) Méhana Mouhou, Dreyfus Affair: Conspiracy in the Republic, Éd. L'Harmattan.
- 2012 (in French) Pierre Gervais, Pauline Peretz et Pierre Stutin, The Secret File of the Dreyfus Affair, Alma editor, (ISBN 978-2362790430)

=== Specialised works ===
- 1960 (in French) Patrice Boussel, The Dreyfus Affair and the Press, Armand Colin, coll. "Kiosk", 272 pp.
- 1962 (in French) Henri Guillemin, The Esterházy Enigma, Gallimard
- 1994 (in French) Jean Doise, A Secret Well Guarded: Military History of the Dreyfus Affair, Le Seuil, 225 pp. (ISBN 2-02-021100-9)
- 1998 (in French) Philippe-E. Landau, Jewish Opinion and the Dreyfus Affair, Albin Michel, "The Presence of Judaism", paperback
- 2000 (in French) Armand Israël, The Hidden Truth of the Dreyfus Affair, Albin Michel, (ISBN 2-226-11123-9)
- 2000 (in French) Collective, Intellectuals Face the Dreyfus Affair, Then and Now, L'Harmattan, (ISBN 978-2738460257)
- 2004 (in French) Général André Bach, The Army of Dreyfus. A political history of the French army from Charles X to "The Affair", Tallandier, (ISBN 2-84734-039-4)
- 2006 (in French) Thierry Lévy, Jean-Pierre Royer, Labori, a lawyer, Louis Audibert Éditions, (ISBN 2-226-11123-9)
- 2006 (in French) Supreme Court, collective, Justice in the Dreyfus Affair, Fayard, (ISBN 978-2213629520)
- 2006 (in French) Pierre Touzin et Francois Vauvillier, Guns of Victory 1914–1918, Volume 1, The Artillery of the campaign. History and Collections, Paris. ISBN 2-35250-022-2
- 2010 (in French) Georges Joumas, Echos of the Dreyfus Affair for an Orléanais, Corsaire Éditions, (ISBN 978-2-910475-12-3)
- 2013 (in English) Leila Schneps and Coralie Colmez, Math on trial. How numbers get used and abused in the courtroom, Basic Books, 2013. ISBN 978-0-465-03292-1. (Chapter 10: "Math error number 10: mathematical madness. The Dreyfus affair: spy or scapegoat?").

=== Anti-Dreyfusard works ===
- 1900 (in French) Charles Descotay, L'affaire, Paris, Noizette.
- 1909 (in French) Henri Dutrait-Crozon, Précis de l'affaire Dreyfus, Paris, New National Library, First Editionmière, Final Edition 1924.
- 1963 (in French) Henriette Dardenne, Lumières sur l'affaire Dreyfus, Paris, Nouvelles Editions Latines.
- 1978 (in French) Jean-Louis Tixier-Vignancour, Si j'avais défendu Dreyfus, Paris, Editions Jean-Claude Simoën
- 2000 (in French) Monique Delcroix, Dreyfus-Esterhazy: Réfutation de la vulgate, Paris, Editions de l'Æncre.

=== Articles ===
- 1978 (in French) Dreyfusards!: Memories from Mathieu Dreyfus and other novelties (presented by Robert Gauthier). Gallimard & Julliard, coll. Archives No. 16, Paris
- 1988 (in French) Max Guermann, "The terrible truth", Revue Les Cahiers Naturalistes, No. 62.
- 1994 (in French) Revue in L'Histoire n o 173, Spécial Dreyfus, January 1994
- 2005 (in French) Special edition of Le Figaro on 12 July 2005, The centenary of the rehabilitation of Captain Dreyfus
- 2006 (in English) Kim Willsher (27 June 2006), "Calls for Dreyfus to be buried in Panthéon", The Guardian
- 2006 (in English) Ronald Schechter (7 July 2006), "The Ghosts of Alfred Dreyfus", The Forward.
- 2006 (in English) Stanley Meisler (9 July 2006), "Not just a Jew in a French jail", Los Angeles Times
- 2006 (in English) Adam Kirsch (11 July 2006), "The Most Shameful of Stains", The New York Sun
- 2007 (in French) Thomas Loué, "The Dreyfus Affair", in L. Boltanski et alii éds., Affairs, scandals, and great causes, Paris, Stock, pp. 213–227
- 2012 (in English) Schultheiss, Katrin. "The Dreyfus Affair and History", Journal of The Historical Society, 12 189–203. doi:10.1111/j.1540-5923.2012.00362.x

== Film ==
=== News and stories ===
- 1899 (in French) Dereliction of Duty in the Trial at Rennes – Sequence of images
- 1899 (in French) Mrs Dreyfus and her lawyer at the exit of the prison at Rennes – Sequence of images
- 1899 (in French) The Dreyfus Affair (reconstructed scenes, 11 episodes, 15 min) by Georges Méliès (a Dreyfusard) – DVD 2008 par Studio Canal
- 1899 (in French) The Dreyfus Affair (reconstructed scenes, 6 episodes) – Actualités Pathé
- 1902 (in French) The Dreyfus Affair – French film attributed to Ferdinand Zecca produced by Pathé
- 1907 (in French) The Dreyfus Affair – French film by Lucien Nonguet produced by Pathé

=== Documentaries ===
- 1965 (in French) The Dreyfus Affair, French film by Jean Vigne, made for schools – Black and White – 18 min
- 1972 (in English) The Dreyfus Affair, American Documentary Film – Black and White – 15 min
- 1974 (in French) Dreyfus or the Intolerable Truth, French Documentary Film by Jean Chérasse – Colour – 90 min – DVD 2006 by Alpamedia/Janus Diffusion
- 1994 (in French) Reasons of State: Chronicle of the Dreyfus Affair, French film in two episodes by Pierre Sorlin – Colour – 26 min

=== Cinema films ===
- 1899 (in English) Trial of Captain Dreyfus, American film – Black and White
- 1919 (in French) J'accuse, French silent film by Abel Gance – Black and White
- 1930 (in German) The Dreyfus Case, German Film by Richard Oswald – Black and White – 115 min
- 1931 (in English) The Dreyfus Case, English Film by F Kraemer and Milton Rosmer – Black and White – 90 min
- 1937 (in English) The Life of Émile Zola, American Film by William Dieterle – Black and White – 90 min
- 1958 (in English) I Accuse!, American film by José Ferrer – Black and White – 90 min
- 1960 (in Greek) I am innocent, Greek film by Dinos Katsouridis – Black and White – 90 min
- 2019 (in English) An Officer and a Spy – 2019 French film directed by Roman Polanski based on Harris' 2013 novel of the same name.

=== TV films ===
- 1964 (in English) In the first-season episode "Rock-a-Bye Munster", of the TV show The Munsters, Herman and Lilly mention meeting 'that charming Captain Dreyfus' on their honeymoon at Devil's Island.
- 1966 (in English) The Time Tunnel, episode "Devil's Island". Story in which Drs. Newman & Phillips encounter Captain Dreyfus, newly arrived on Devil's Island. ABC, broadcast on 11 November 1966.
- 1968 (in German) Affaire Dreyfus, German film in 3 episodes by ZDF
- 1978 (in French) Zola or the Human Conscience, French film in four episodes by Stellio Lorenzi – Produced by Antenne 2 – Colour
- 1991 (in English) Can a Jew Be innocent?, English film in four episodes by Jack Emery – Produced by the BBC – Colour – 30 min (X4)
- 1991 (in English) Prisoner of Honour, American Film by Ken Russell – Colour – 88 min
- 1994 (in French) The Dreyfus Affair, French film in two episodes by Yves Boisset – Produced by France 2 – Colour
- 1994 (in French) Rage and Outrage, by George Whyte, French film – Produced by ARTE – Colour
- 1995 (in English) Dreyfus in Opera and Ballet, German and English film by arte – Produced by WDR – Colour
- 1995 (in German) Die Affäre Dreyfus, German film in two episodes by arte.

== Radio ==
- 1995 (in French) The Dreyfus Affair, interview with George Whyte, France Culture, 25 March 1995.
- 1998 (in French) J'accuse, George Whyte, Canadian Broadcasting Service (CBS), 10 October 1998.
- 2005 (in English) The Dreyfus Affair, interview with George Whyte, BBC Radio 3. By John Pilgrim, 28 October 2005.
- "In Our Time – The Dreyfus Affair" BBC Radio 4 (8 October 2009). Melvyn Bragg; Robert Gildea, Professor of Modern History at Oxford University; Ruth Harris, Lecturer in Modern History at Oxford University; Robert Tombs, Professor of French History at Cambridge University

== Literature ==
- 1898 (in English) Poems written by Philadelphia poet Florence Earle Coates (1850–1927) about the affair:

"Dreyfus" – published in Poet Lore (September 1898) and subsequently in Mine and Thine (1904).
"Dreyfus" – a fugitive poem published in The Independent (16 February 1899).
"Picquart" – published in The Century Magazine (July 1902) and subsequently in Mine and Thine (1904) and Poems Vol II.
"Le Grand Salut" – published in The Living Age (25 August 1906) and subsequently in Lyrics of Life (1909) and Poems Vol II.

- 1908 (in French) Anatole France: A satirical take on the Dreyfus affair appears in Island of Penguins.
- 1913 (in French) Roger Martin du Gard: The Dreyfus affair occupies most of Martin du Gard's novel Jean Barois.
- 1922 (in French) Marcel Proust, The Dreyfus affair plays an important part in In Search of Lost Time, especially Vols. 3 and 4.
- 1994 (in English) The Dreyfus Centenary Committee, The Dreyfus Centenary Bulletin, London/Bonn.
- 1994 (in French) George Whyte, The Affair in Song; Bibliothèque de documentation internationale contemporaine; Paris, Flammarion.
- 1996 (in English) George Whyte, The Dreyfus Trilogy, Inter Nationes.
- 2006 (in English) George Whyte, The Dreyfus Affair, A Chronological History, Palgrave Macmillan.
- 2010 (in English) Kate Taylor, A Man in Uniform.
- 2010 (in Italian) Umberto Eco, the Dreyfus affair is woven into the plot of The Prague Cemetery.
- 2011 (in English) The Dreyfus Affair – A Trilogy of Plays, Oberon Books, London, January 2011.
- 2013 (in English) Robert Harris, An Officer and a Spy, London: Hutchinson. 2013. ISBN 978-0-09-194455-1

=== Theatre ===
- 1895 (in English) Seymour Hicks wrote a drama titled One of the Best, based on the Dreyfus trial, starring William Terriss. It played at the Adelphi Theatre in London in 1895. The idea was suggested to Hicks by W. S. Gilbert.
- Late 1890s (in English) Jacob Gordin wrote a drama in Yiddish titled Captain Dreyfus; Pogrom based on the Dreyfus affair. The translation was republished in Nine One-Act Plays from the Yiddish by Bessie F White which was published in 1932.
- 1992 (in English) AJIOM/Captain Dreyfus, Musical. Music and text by George Whyte.
- 1994 (in English) The Dreyfus Trilogy by George Whyte (in collaboration with Luciano Berio, Jost Meier and Alfred Schnittke) comprising the opera Dreyfus-Die Affäre (Deutsche Oper Berlin, 8 May 1994; Theater Basle, 16 October 1994; The Dreyfus Affair New York City Opera, April 1996); the dance drama Dreyfus – J'accuse (Oper der Stadt Bonn, 4 September 1994) and the musical satire Rage et Outrage (Arte, April 1994; Zorn und Schande, Arte 1994; Rage and Outrage Channel 4, May 1994).
- 1998 (in English) Dreyfus: Prisoner of Devil's Island – Music Theatre piece – Music and Lyrics by Bryan Kesselman, St Giles Cripplegate, London, November 1998; Part of the 9th London international Jewish Music Festival.
- 2008 Dreyfus In time by George Whyte, Opernhaus Zurich, December 2008; Jüdisches Museum Berlin, May 2009. Also in German, English, French, Hungarian, Hebrew and Czech.

=== Radio drama ===
- 2009 (in English) BBC Radio, J'Accuse, UK, Hattie Naylor. Radio dramatisation inspired by a newspaper article written by Émile Zola in response to the Dreyfus Affair of the 1890s. BBC Radio 4, broadcast on 13 June 2009.
