= Bill Sheppard (footballer) =

English footballer

Personal information
- Full name: William Sheppard
- Date of birth: c. 1906
- Place of birth: Ferryhill, England
- Date of death: 27 December 1950
- Place of death: Hemel Hempstead, England
- Position: Forward

Youth career
- Ferryhill Athletic
- Chilton Colliery Athletic
- Crook Town

Senior career*
Years	Team	Apps	(Gls)
1926–1927	Liverpool	0	(0)
1927–1930	Watford	89	(37)
1930–1931	Queens Park Rangers	13	(4)
1931–1933	Coventry City	22	(7)
1933–1934	Walsall	58	(20)
1934	Chester	1	(0)
1934–1935	Walsall	13	(7)
1935–1936	Tunbridge Wells Rangers		
- Odhams
- * Club domestic league appearances and goals

William Sheppard (c. 1906 – 27 December 1950) was an English professional footballer. He was capable of playing as both an inside and outside forward.

== Career ==
Born in Ferryhill, County Durham, Sheppard started his career as an amateur in County Durham, before joining Liverpool in 1926. He signed as a professional for Watford in 1927, who at the time were playing in the Football League Third Division South. In the 1927–28 season—his first at Watford—Sheppard scored 25 goals in all competitions, finishing as the club's top scorer. After 39 goals in 95 Watford games, he joined QPR on a free transfer in 1930, and moved to Coventry City the following year.

Sheppard joined Walsall in January 1933, and one of his first games for the club was an FA Cup Third Round tie against Arsenal at Fellows Park, in front of 11,150 spectators. At the time Arsenal were competing for the First Division title, which they eventually won. Walsall were in the Third Division North. Sheppard played the game at inside right. After a goalless first half, Walsall centre-forward Gilbert Alsop scored the opening goal with a header in the second half. Five minutes later Alsop won a penalty kick, which Sheppard converted to double the team's lead. Arsenal were unable to overturn the deficit; Walsall won the match 2–0.

He remained at Walsall until the end of the 1933–34 season. He briefly joined Chester, but returned to Walsall in October of that year, before leaving permanently in June 1935. Season 1935–36 saw him at Tunbridge Wells Rangers in the Southern League.

Sheppard died in Hemel Hempstead, Hertfordshire, during a Christmas celebration.
