= Arnold Bliss =

English footballer

Personal information
- Full name: Arnold Percy Donald Bliss
- Date of birth: 8 November 1909
- Place of birth: Wolstanton, England
- Date of death: 1 December 1975 (aged 66)
- Place of death: Birmingham, England
- Position: Defender

Senior career*
Years	Team	Apps	(Gls)
192?–1929	Dartford		
1929–1933	Port Vale	9	(0)
1933	West Ham United	0	(0)
1933–1934	Stalybridge Celtic		
1934	Rochdale	5	(0)
- Stafford Rangers
- * Club domestic league appearances and goals

Arnold Percy Donald Bliss (8 November 1909 – 1 December 1975) was an English footballer who played as a defender for Dartford, Port Vale, West Ham United, Stalybridge Celtic, Rochdale, and Stafford Rangers.

== Career ==
Bliss played amateur football for Dartford in the Kent League before joining Second Division side Port Vale in October 1929. He made his debut in a 2–1 defeat to Charlton Athletic at The Valley on 7 November 1931 and jockeyed with Jack Round for the number 5 jersey throughout the season; Round won this battle and kept Bliss to just six appearances. In the next season Bliss filled in for George Shenton on three occasions before being released from the Old Recreation Ground in April 1933. After a trial with West Ham United, he moved on to Stalybridge Celtic, Rochdale and Stafford Rangers.

== Career statistics ==
Appearances and goals by club, season and competition
Club	Season	League			FA Cup		Total	
Club	Season	Division	Apps	Goals	Apps	Goals	Apps	Goals
Port Vale	1931–32	Second Division	6	0	0	0	6	0
Port Vale	1932–33	Second Division	3	0	0	0	3	0
Port Vale	Total		9	0	0	0	9	0
West Ham United	1932–33	Second Division	0	0	0	0	0	0
Rochdale	1933–34	Third Division North	5	0	0	0	5	0
