= Harry Nuttall =

Harry Nuttall may refer to:

- Harry Nuttall (politician) (1849–1924), Member of Parliament for Stretford, 1906–1918
- Harry Nuttall (footballer) (1897–1969), Bolton Wanderers and England footballer
- Harry Nuttall (racing driver) (born 1963), British auto racing driver
