= Lewis Caunce =

English footballer

Personal information
- Full name: Lewis Caunce
- Date of birth: 20 April 1911
- Place of birth: Earlestown, Lancashire, England
- Date of death: 1978 (aged 66–67)
- Height: 6 ft 1 in (1.85 m)
- Position: Goalkeeper

Senior career*
Years	Team	Apps	(Gls)
1931–1932	Huddersfield Town	0	(0)
1932–1933	Rochdale	18	(0)
1933–1935	Wigan Athletic		
1935–1939	Oldham Athletic	134	(0)
- * Club domestic league appearances and goals

Lewis Caunce (20 April 1911 - 1978) was an English professional association football goalkeeper of the 1930s. Born in Earlestown, he joined Rochdale from Huddersfield Town in 1932, where he made 18 appearances for the club. He left to join Wigan Athletic in 1933, spending two seasons with the Cheshire League club before returning to the Football League with Oldham Athletic in 1935.

On Boxing Day 1935, Caunce played in goal for Oldham in their 4–13 defeat against Tranmere Rovers, a Football League record for most goals scored in a game. Caunce notably saved a penalty during the game to prevent Tranmere centre forward Bunny Bell from scoring 10 goals, and Caunce's teammate Tommy Williamson remarked years later that despite the scoreline, the keeper had "played a blinder".

Caunce played 134 league games for Oldham before his football career was ended prematurely by the outbreak of the Second World War.
