= Ian Wright (percussionist) =

British classical percussionist

Ian Wright was born in Aberdeen, United Kingdom. He studied mathematics at the University of Aberdeen before embarking on a career in music. His main interest outside music is travelling, especially when it involves walking and cycling.

== Career ==
Wright was made a fellow of the Royal Northern College of Music in 1988. He was involved in the preparation of the first percussion syllabus for the Associated Board of the Royal Schools of Music (ABRSM), a task which included writing the pieces for the four timpani books and some of the snare drum pieces for the examinations. He is presently a diploma examiner for the ABRSM. Since 1973, Wright has coached the percussion section of the National Youth Orchestra of Great Britain, of which he had at one time been a member for six years.

== Publications ==
- Graded Music for Timpani Book (Book I to IV)
- Graded Music for Snare Drum (Book I to IV) edited with Kevin Hathway
- Graded Music for Tuned Percussion (Book I to IV) edited with Kevin Hathway

== Compositions ==
- Baroque Notes (timpani) on YouTube
- Bouncing Beethoven (timpani) on YouTube
- Russian Galop (timpani)

== Noble Student ==
- Le Yu
