= Jack Robson (footballer) =

English footballer (1906–1966)

Personal information
- Full name: John Cecil Robson
- Date of birth: 24 March 1906
- Place of birth: Birtley, England
- Date of death: 1966 (aged 59–60)
- Position: Winger

Senior career*
| Years | Team | Apps | (Gls) |
| 1921–1922 | Berwick Main | | |
| 1922 | Durham County Amateurs | | |
| 1922–1923 | Burnley | 0 | (0) |
| 1923–1924 | Birtley Town | | |
| 1924–1925 | Hull City | 1 | (0) |
| 1925–1928 | Reading | 108 | (21) |
| 1928–1932 | Derby County | 38 | (10) |
| 1932–1933 | Southend United | 22 | (5) |
| 1933 | Chester | 0 | (0) |
| 1933–1934 | Rochdale | 28 | (10) |
| 1934–1935 | Oldham Athletic | 37 | (8) |
| 1936 | Hull Brewery | | |
| Total | | 234 | (54) |
- * Club domestic league appearances and goals

John Cecil Robson (24 March 1906 – 1966) was an English footballer who played in the Football League for Derby County, Hull City, Oldham Athletic, Reading, Rochdale and Southend United.
