= George Ivory (footballer) =

English footballer

Personal information
- Full name: George William Albert Ivory
- Date of birth: 21 April 1910
- Place of birth: Sittingbourne, Kent, England
- Date of death: q1 1992 (aged 82)
- Place of death: Swale, Kent, England
- Height: 5 ft 11 in (1.80 m)
- Position: Inside forward

Senior career*
Years	Team	Apps	(Gls)
–1932	Sheppey United		
1932–1933	Millwall	3	(2)
1933–1934	York City	31	(9)
1934–1935	Tottenham Hotspur	0	(0)
1935–1936	Sittingbourne		
Total		34	(11)
- * Club domestic league appearances and goals

George William Albert Ivory (21 April 1910 – q1 1992) was an English professional footballer who played as an inside forward in the Football League for Millwall and York City. He also played in non-League football for Sheppey United and Sittingbourne, and was on the books of Tottenham Hotspur without making a league appearance.
