= Kevin Hathway =

English percussionist and educator

Kevin Hathway is an English percussionist and educator. Besides being a member of the Philharmonia Orchestra, a position he has held since 1979, he is head of wind, brass and percussion at the Purcell School. He is a diploma examiner for the Associated Board of the Royal Schools of Music and co-devised their timpani, snare drum and tuned percussion examination syllabus.

From 1986 until 2007, he was head of the percussion faculty at the Royal College of Music. He creates and presents numerous concerts aimed at younger audiences and his unique Elastic Band – a micro-orchestra of 15 musicians – is in great demand throughout the UK and abroad. His themed family concerts for the Philharmonia are a concept he uses with MusicQuest, Britten Sinfonia, Southbank Sinfonia and the Malaysian Philharmonic Orchestra. He also directs Alberts Band, an educational chamber group resident at the Royal Albert Hall.

== Publications ==
- Graded Music for Snare Drum (Book I to IV) edited with Ian Wright
- Graded Music for Tuned Percussion (Book I to IV) edited with Ian Wright
