= James Stevenson (footballer, born 1903) =

Scottish footballer

Personal information
- Full name: James Tervit Stevenson
- Date of birth: 10 November 1903
- Place of birth: Newmains, Scotland
- Date of death: 1973 (aged 69–70)
- Position: Inside right

Senior career*
Years	Team	Apps	(Gls)
- Newmains
- Overtown Rangers
1924–1926	Third Lanark	38	(7)
1926–1929	South Shields	54	(24)
1929–1931	Bradford City	10	(1)
- Aldershot
1932–1935	Stockport County	96	(38)
- Walsall
1936	Stockport County	1	(0)
1936–1937	Macclesfield Town	9	(2)
Total		209+	(72+)

Managerial career
- 1936–1937: Macclesfield Town (player-manager)
- * Club domestic league appearances and goals

James Tervit Stevenson (10 November 1903 – 1973) was a Scottish professional footballer who played as an inside right.

== Career ==
Born in Newmains, Stevenson spent his early career with Newmains, Overtown Rangers, Third Lanark and South Shields. He combined his early playing career with work as an engineer. He scored 24 goals in 54 league games for South Shields after signing for them in 1926.

He signed for Bradford City in July 1929, scoring 1 goal in 10 league appearances for the club, before moving to Aldershot in July 1931. He later played for Stockport County, Walsall and Macclesfield Town.

He had three spells at Stockport, also served as reserve team trainer after leaving Macclesfield, and in 2002 he was inducted into the Stockport County Hall of Fame.

He also served as player-manager of Macclesfield in the 1936–37 season, scoring twice in 9 league games for them. After leaving Macclesfield he returned to Stockport, serving a reserve team trainer.

== Sources ==
- Frost, Terry (1988). Bradford City A Complete Record 1903-1988. Breedon Books Sport. ISBN 0-907969-38-0.
