= Prenton Park =

Football stadium in Birkenhead, England

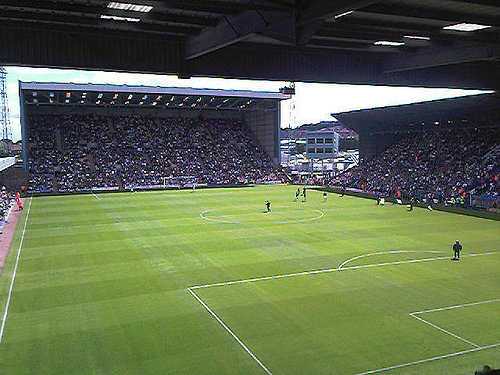
- View of the Kop and Main Stands
- Interactive map of Prenton Park
- Address: Prenton Road West; Prenton; Birkenhead CH42 9PY; Merseyside; England
- Coordinates: 53°22′25″N 3°01′57″W
- Owner: Tranmere Rovers
- Capacity: 16,587
- Surface: GrassMaster
- Record attendance: 24,424
- Field size: 112 by 71 yards (102.4 m × 64.9 m)
- Public transit: Rock Ferry (1.2 mi)

Construction
- Opened: 9 March 1912
- Renovated: 1995

Tenants
- Tranmere Rovers (1912–present); Liverpool Reserves (2009–2018); Liverpool Women (2018–2024)

Website
- www.tranmererovers.co.uk

Prenton Park is a football stadium in the area of Prenton, Birkenhead, Merseyside, England. It is the home ground of Tranmere Rovers Football Club since opening in 1912, and formerly the home ground of Liverpool Reserves and Liverpool Women. The ground has had several rebuilds, with the most recent occurring in 1995 in response to the requirement of the Taylor Report to become all-seater. The stadium now holds 16,587 in four stands: the Kop, the Johnny King Stand, the Main Stand and the Cowshed for away supporters.

Attendances at the ground have fluctuated over its hundred-year history. Its largest-ever crowd was 24,424 for a 1972 FA Cup match between Tranmere Rovers and Stoke City. In 2010, an average of 5,000 fans attended each home game.

== History ==
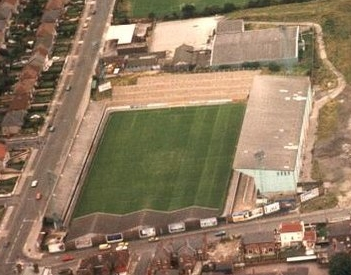
The ground in 1986

Tranmere Rovers F.C. were formed in 1884; they played their first matches at Steeles Field in Birkenhead but, in 1887, they bought a new site from Tranmere Rugby Club. The ground was variously referred to as the "Borough Road Enclosure", "Ravenshaw's Field" and "South Road". The name "Prenton Park" was adopted in 1895 as a result of a suggestion in the letters page of the Football Echo. Not strictly within Prenton, it is likely that the name was chosen as the area was regarded as more upmarket than nearby Tranmere.

Because the land was required for housing and a school, Tranmere were forced to move and the name went with them. The present Prenton Park was opened by the Mayor of Birkenhead, Councillor George Proudman, on 9 March 1912. Their first match was played against Lancaster Town in the Lancashire Combination. There were stands (also known as bleachers) on both sides of the pitch, a paddock and three open terraces, the general format which remained until 1994.

Floodlights were installed in the ground in September 1958. The supporters' association raised the £15,000 cost of the new lights. When manager Dave Russell joined the club in 1961, one of his many influential changes was to take advantage of the lights, playing regular home games on Friday nights rather than the usual Saturday afternoon. This allowed supporters to watch Tranmere on Fridays and First Division sides Everton or Liverpool on Saturdays. The idea was successful and continued until the 1990s.

Over the years, various upgrades and repairs have been made to the stadium. By 1968, the old wooden Main Stand was in poor condition and in need of replacement. At a cost of £80,000, today's Main Stand was erected and opened by Minister for Sport and former referee Denis Howell. In 1979, the terracing on the Cowshed and Paddock was concreted. The Tranmere suite was added to the Main Stand in 1988, with further bars and executive suites added soon after.

Many improvements to the ground were driven by changes in legislation. In 1985, the Safety of Sports Grounds Act led to a reduction in capacity from 18,000 to 8,000. The Kop End was closed, and the Main Stand capacity was reduced by 3,000, because there were insufficient access points. £50,000 was spent on safety work to maintain a capacity of 8,000, and the club were unable to afford any further refurbishment but the biggest change of all took place during 1994 and 1995. The Taylor Report suggested that all stadia in the top two divisions of English football should no longer permit standing. The club's response was to redevelop three sides of the ground with entirely new all-seater stands created – the Borough Road Stand, the Cowshed and the new Kop. Capacity in the ground thus increased from 14,200 to the 16,587 of today.

In 2009, Liverpool F.C. Reserves moved from the Racecourse Ground to Prenton Park. In 2018, Liverpool F.C. Women moved here as well.

== Stands ==
A plan of the stadium's layout

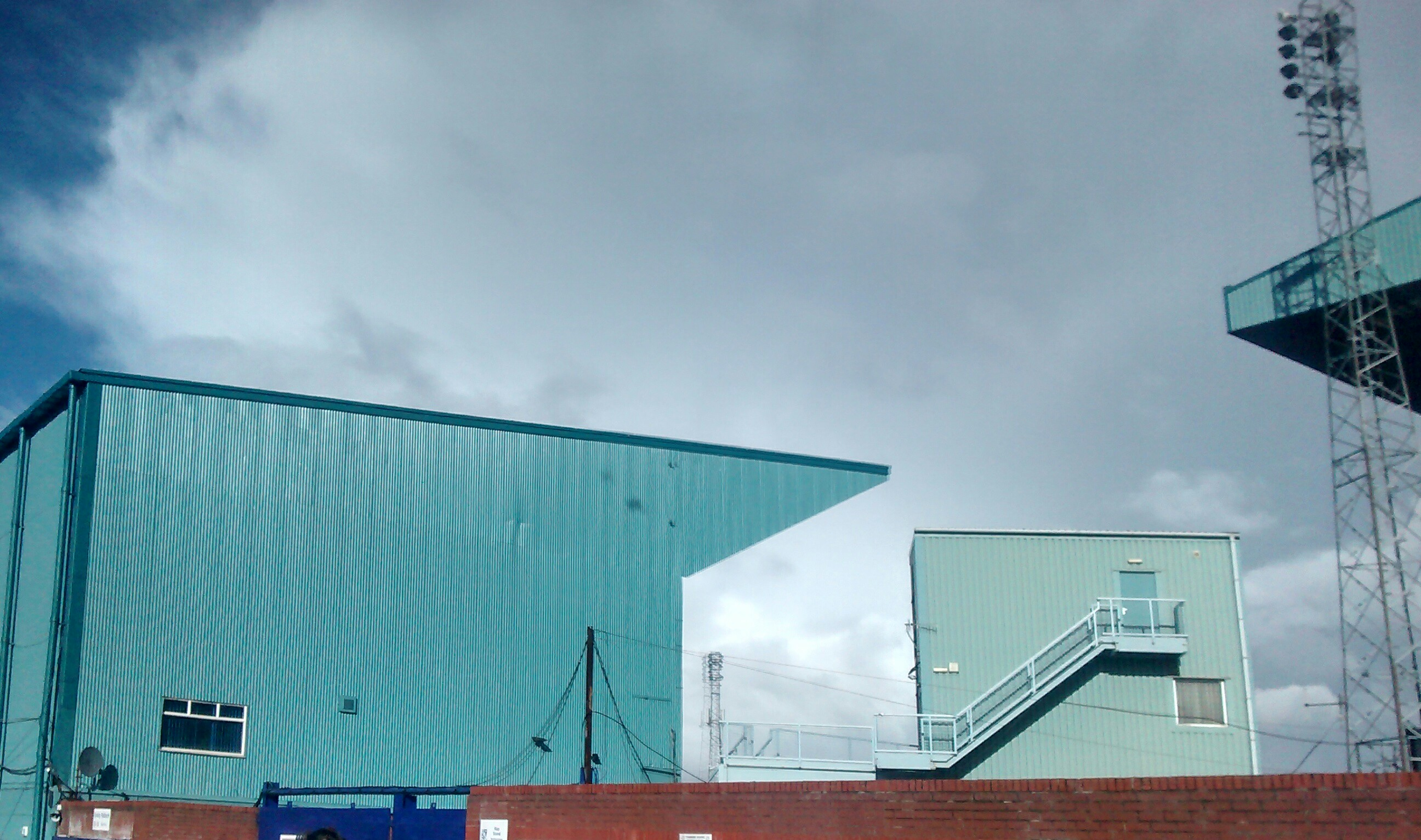
An outside view of the Main Stand in 2015

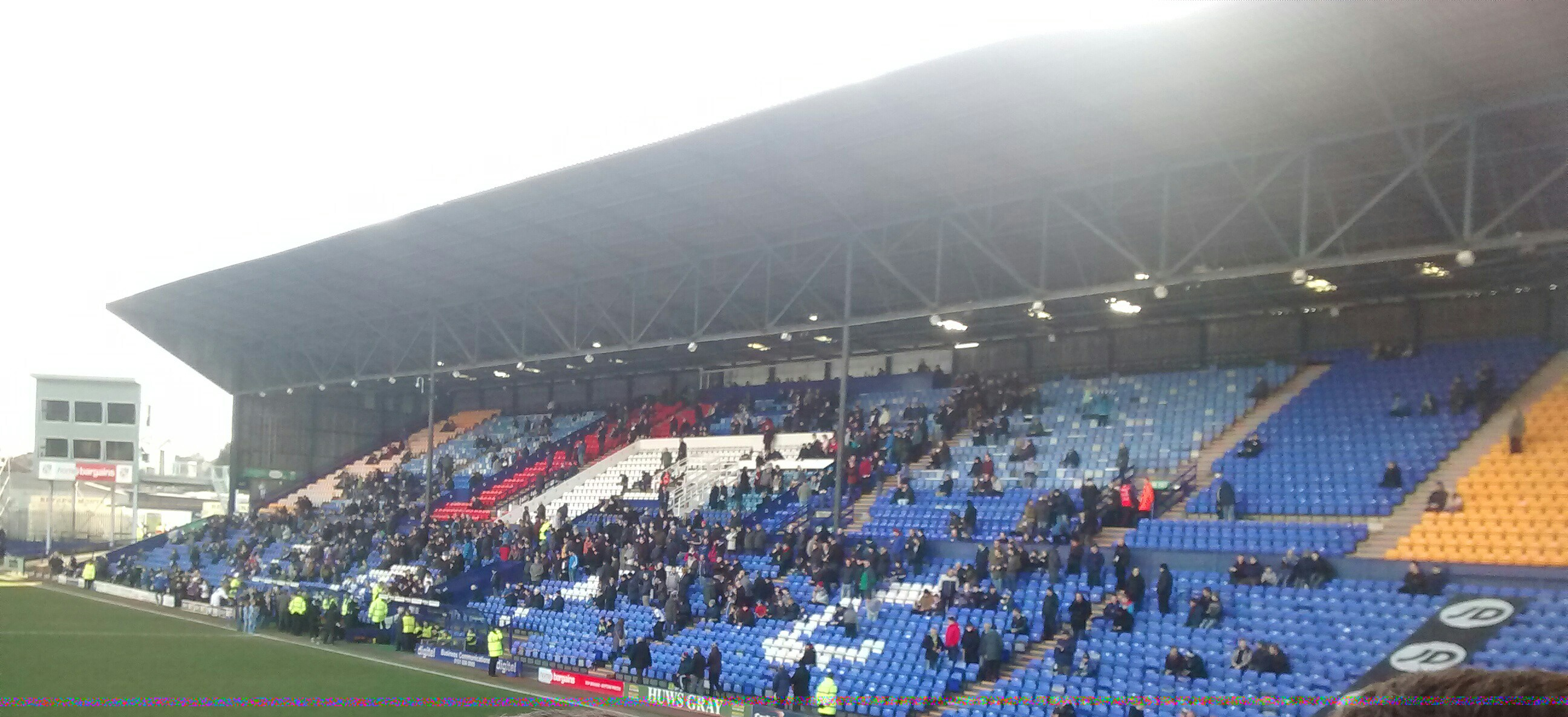
The Main Stand in 2015 viewed from The Cowshed Stand

=== Main Stand ===
The Main Stand is the oldest in Prenton Park, having been opened in December 1968. It is also the largest, with a capacity of 5,957. A two tier stand, it is generally divided into three main sections. The lower tier consists of the Bebington End paddock (capacity 1,150) and the Town End paddock (capacity 1,209), either side of the halfway line. The upper tier is simply referred to as the Main Stand (capacity 3,598).

The Main Stand houses the VIP area, directors box and various suites. The Tranmere suite was added to the Main Stand in 1988, with the Dixie Dean suite, Bunny Bell bar and Dave Russell restaurant added soon after. In 2008 it was noted the structure was becoming increasingly expensive to repair.

=== Kop ===
The Bebington Kop, simply referred to as the Kop, is a large single-tier, all-seater stand with a capacity of 5,696. Completed in 1995, it replaced the earlier open terrace (also called the Kop) which had stood behind the goal at the Bebington End. Originally the Kop housed both home and away fans, split down the middle, and occasionally was handed entirely to the away fans. However, following the 2000 League Cup semi-final against Bolton, when the Kop was given entirely to the home fans, a campaign was begun to claim the Kop as a home end. From the 2000–01 season this became the case, with away fans housed in the Cowshed.

=== Johnny King Stand ===
Built in 1995 and formerly known as the Borough Road Stand, it was renamed in 2002 to recognise former Rovers manager John King. The stand runs along the Borough Road side of the pitch, and is a low-rise seated stand with a capacity of 2,414.

=== Cowshed ===
The Everclad Cowshed houses away fans at Prenton Park, and has a capacity of 2,500. It has a slanted seating arrangement, caused by the main road running behind it. It historically housed the more vocal home fans, but was switched to away supporters around the start of the 21st century. Since the change, a bar and TV screens have been added to the stand. The name is derived from its appearance before the redevelopment in 1995. With a 3 peak roof of corrugated iron, walls of wooden plank and a cinder bank floor it visually resembled an agricultural building.

== Attendances ==
Prenton Park has seen the number of supporters rise and fall considerably over its hundred-year history. Around 8,000 visitors watched the first game at the stadium on 11 March 1912, as Tranmere beat Lancaster Town 8–0. Early attendances varied from 5,000 to 8,000, though, on Boxing Day 1921, 11,137 supporters came to see Tranmere take on Bolton Wanderers Reserves. Tranmere entered The Football League the next season, and 7,011 watched their first game against Crewe Alexandra F.C. There was an average of 6,000 in attendance at home games, before the Football League was suspended as a result of the Second World War.

After the war, the number of supporters rose, and by the early 1960s this number had increased to highs of 12,000. Attendances began to fall towards the end of the 1960s; this trend continued through the 1970s, though the decade did give Tranmere its largest-ever crowd: 24,424 on 5 February 1972, for a fourth-round FA Cup match against Stoke City. With today's capacity of under 17,000, it is unlikely that this record attendance will ever be broken.

The 1980s saw the number of supporters falling to some of the ground's lowest levels. The lowest ever attendance at Prenton Park was on 20 February 1984, when only 937 supporters watched a 2–0 victory over Halifax Town. However, the decade also saw a high number of supporters in the ground for other reasons. In the Hillsborough disaster, 97 Liverpool F.C. fans lost their lives on 15 April 1989. In the following days 12,000 people attended a memorial service at Prenton Park.

Tranmere's success in the 1990s led to improved attendances, rising to around 9,000 per game. By 2010, this had fallen to around 5,000 per game; however, 12,249 supporters took advantage of an offer of free admission to watch a replayed match against Notts County F.C., on 19 April 2011. In the season 2011–2012, there were two £5 administration offers available; one of them was on a Bank Holiday and the other was for a celebration of 100 years of Prenton Park 1912–2012 with an attendance of 6,824, with many events on before and after the game and at half time.

== Record games ==
=== Tranmere v Oldham, 1935 ===
On Boxing Day 1935, Tranmere faced Oldham Athletic at Prenton Park in the Third Division North. Oldham had beaten Tranmere 4–1 the previous day, but Tranmere won 13–4 in the return fixture, including nine goals by Bunny Bell. At the time Bell's feat was an individual record, but it stood for only four months before Joe Payne netted ten for Luton Town, on his debut against Bristol Rovers. However, the aggregate of 17 goals in one game remains a league record.

=== Women's FA Cup finals ===
The only major finals to take place at Prenton Park were the Women's FA Cup in 1991 and 1992. The 1991 final was contested by Millwall Lionesses and Doncaster Belles. Millwall won the game 1–0 in front of a crowd of 4,000. The game was broadcast live on Channel 4. In 1992, Doncaster Belles returned to beat Red Star Southampton 4–0.

=== Shelbourne v Rangers, 1998 ===
The only UEFA European Fixture to take place at Prenton Park was a UEFA Cup first qualifying round tie between Irish team Shelbourne and Scottish team Rangers, on 22 July 1998. Due to fears of sectarian violence, and after discussions between the two clubs and UEFA, Prenton Park was chosen as the venue for the first leg, with Shelbourne as the home team. The match finished 3–5 in favour of Rangers after Shelbourne (at the time a semi-professional side) had earlier taken a 3–0 lead. As a result of this game, Rangers were fined 25,000 Swiss Francs and warned by UEFA for their fans' behaviour at the game.

== Music ==
The stadium hosted the Wirral Live music festival in 2017, with bands such as Madness, Little Mix and The Libertines.

In 2024 the stadium hosted the Wirral Family Festival with a main stage hosting tribute bands and a dance music stage hosting well known local house music DJs in addition to a kids' stage featuring various acts for children.

== Transport systems ==
The nearest railway station to the ground is Rock Ferry on Merseyrail's Wirral Line, 1.2 miles away. The ground is also served by the 464 bus route, with direct services to Liverpool.
