= Stan Wilcockson =

English footballer and coach

Personal information
- Full name: Ernest Stanley Wilcockson
- Date of birth: 11 May 1905
- Place of birth: Poplar, London, England
- Date of death: 3 March 1965 (aged 59)
- Place of death: Dartford, Kent, England
- Height: 5 ft 11 in (1.80 m)
- Position: Half-back

Senior career*
Years	Team	Apps	(Gls)
–1930	Crittall Athletic		
1930–????	Crystal Palace	5	(1)
–1933	Dartford		
1933–1934	York City	39	(5)
1934–1935	Leeds United	4	(0)
1935–1939	Swindon Town	134	(5)
1939–????	Tunbridge Wells Rangers		
Total		182	(11)
- * Club domestic league appearances and goals

Ernest Stanley Wilcockson (11 May 1905 – 3 March 1965) was an English professional footballer who played as a half-back in the Football League for Crystal Palace, York City, Leeds United and Swindon Town in non-League football for Crittall Athletic, Dartford and Tunbridge Wells Rangers. After retiring he worked as a coach with West Ham United's youth team.
