= Jimmy Temple =

English footballer

Personal information
- Full name: James Leslie Temple
- Date of birth: 16 September 1904
- Place of birth: Scarborough, North Riding of Yorkshire, England
- Date of death: 1960 (aged 55–56)
- Position: Winger

Youth career
- 1923–1924: Tyneside Juniors

Senior career*
Years	Team	Apps	(Gls)
1924–1925	Preston Colliery		
1925–1926	Wallsend		
1926–1931	Fulham	156	(58)
1931–1933	Sunderland	31	(12)
1933–1934	Gateshead	18	(4)
1934–1935	Crook Town		
1935–1936	Ashington		
1936–193?	Murton Colliery Welfare		
- * Club domestic league appearances and goals

James Leslie Temple (16 September 1904 – 1960) was an English professional footballer who played as a winger for Sunderland.
