= Joseph Shonakan =

English footballer (1913–1973)

Personal information
- Full name: Joseph Francis Shonakan
- Date of birth: 13 November 1913
- Place of birth: Bolton, Lancashire, England
- Date of death: November 24, 1973 (aged 60)
- Place of death: Bolton, Lancashire, England
- Position: Outside right

Senior career*
Years	Team	Apps	(Gls)
- Bolton Wanderers
- Ashton National
- Northampton Town
1932–1933	Rochdale	27	(2)
1933–1934	Wrexham	4	(0)
1934–1935	Southport	1	(0)
- Chorley
- Northwich Victoria
- * Club domestic league appearances and goals

Joseph Francis Shonakan (13 November 1913 - 24 November 1973) was an English professional footballer who played as an outside right. He made appearances in the English Football League for Rochdale, Wrexham and Southport
