= Edward Adams (footballer) =

English footballer (1908–1981)

Personal information
- Full name: Arthur Edward Adams
- Date of birth: 12 November 1908
- Place of birth: Bromborough, England
- Date of death: July 1981 (aged 72)
- Place of death: Birkenhead, England
- Position: Outside left

Senior career*
Years	Team	Apps	(Gls)
- Bromborough Pool
1929–1933	Tranmere Rovers	6	(1)
- Bromborough Pool
- * Club domestic league appearances and goals

Arthur Edward Adams (12 November 1908 – July 1981) was an English footballer who played as an outside left in the Football League for Tranmere Rovers.
