= George Snow (footballer) =

English footballer

Personal information
- Full name: George Edward Gardiner Snow
- Date of birth: 9 February 1910
- Place of birth: Newcastle-upon-Tyne, England
- Height: 5 ft 10 in (1.78 m)
- Position: Inside left

Senior career*
Years	Team	Apps	(Gls)
1929–1930	Walker Celtic		
1930–1931	Leeds United		
1931–1933	Rochdale		
1933–1939	Wrexham	207	(46)
- * Club domestic league appearances and goals

George Edward Gardiner Snow (9 February 1910 – date of death unknown) was an English professional footballer who played as a inside left. He made over 200 appearances in the English Football League for Wrexham.
