= Cliff Walmsley =

English footballer

Personal information
- Full name: Clifford Walmsley
- Date of birth: 25 November 1910
- Place of birth: Burnley, England
- Date of death: 1983 (aged 72–73)
- Position: Goalkeeper

Senior career*
Years	Team	Apps	(Gls)
1930–1931	Burnley	0	(0)
1931–1932	Manchester City	2	(0)
1932–1933	Reading	3	(0)
1933–1935	Rochdale	59	(0)
Total		64	(0)
- * Club domestic league appearances and goals

Clifford Walmsley (25 November 1910 – 1983) was an English professional footballer who played as a goalkeeper.
