= Bill Armstrong (English footballer) =

English footballer (1913–1995)

Personal information
- Full name: William Armstrong
- Date of birth: 3 July 1913
- Place of birth: Throckley, England
- Date of death: 1 June 1995 (aged 81)
- Height: 6 ft 0 in (1.83 m)

Senior career*
| Years | Team | Apps | (Gls) |
- Rochdale
- Aston Villa
- Swindon Town
- Gillingham
- * Club domestic league appearances and goals

William Armstrong (3 July 1913 – 1 June 1995) was an English professional footballer.

Born in Throckley, he played for Rochdale, Aston Villa, Swindon Town and Gillingham between 1931 and 1938, making over 130 appearances in the Football League.
