= Tony Weldon =

Scottish footballer

Personal information
- Date of birth: 12 November 1900
- Place of birth: Motherwell, Scotland
- Date of death: 1953 (aged 52–53)
- Place of death: Cumbernauld, Scotland
- Position: Inside left

Senior career*
Years	Team	Apps	(Gls)
–1924	Kilsyth Rangers		
1924–1927	Airdrieonians	49	(30)
1927–1929	Everton	70	(13)
1929–1931	Hull City	31	(6)
1931–1932	West Ham United	20	(3)
1932–1933	Lovells Athletic		
1933–1934	Rochdale	27	(7)
1934	Dundalk		
1934–????	Bangor		

Managerial career
- 1934–????: Bangor
- * Club domestic league appearances and goals

Anthony Weldon (12 November 1900 – 1953) was a Scottish footballer who played as an inside left for Kilsyth Rangers, Airdrieonians, Everton, Hull City, West Ham United, Lovells Athletic, Rochdale, Dundalk and Bangor.

== Footballing career ==
Weldon played football in Scotland, England, Wales, Ireland and Northern Ireland, often spending only one season with a club. Raised in Croy, a village north of Glasgow, Weldon started his footballing career with local side Kilsyth Rangers before signing for Airdrieonians on 27 May 1924 for a transfer fee of £5. With Airdrieonians, such were his performances that he found himself picked for the first team ahead of Scottish international players, Willie Russell and Hughie Gallacher. He was part of the side that finished second in Division One two years running, in 1924–25 (four appearances) and 1925–26 (19 appearances and four goals), and scored 26 goals in 26 appearances as the club finished fourth in 1926–27.

On 10 March 1927, he moved to England and Everton for a transfer fee of £2,000 where he remained until the end of 1929. Weldon's debut match for Everton, on 12 March 1927, saw his side win 2–1 against Leeds United. Weldon scored one of the goals, the other coming from Everton legend, Dixie Dean. His time at Everton saw him play 74 games and score 13 goals and be part of the team which won the 1927–28 First Division.

Signing for Hull City for £1,000 in December 1929 he remained there until 1931 when he moved south to play for West Ham United. He made his debut on 29 August 1931 in a 1–0 away win against Bolton Wanderers; his debut goal coming in his next game, a 3–1 home win against Chelsea. He lasted a single season playing 22 games in all competitions scoring four goals in a season which saw West Ham relegated to the Second Division having finished in 22nd and bottom place in the First Division.

In 1932, Weldon signed for Welsh side, Lovell's Athletic, then playing in the Western League. After a season he moved to Rochdale in the Third Division North, again only for one season. He next signed for Dundalk where he became player-coach but this lasted only a few months before he became player-manager of Bangor.

== Personal life ==
Weldon died in 1953. He was the father-in-law of footballer Jim Storrie, who also played for Airdrieonians but was possibly best known as a Leeds United player of the 1960s.
