= Loam molding =

Loam molding was formerly used for making cast iron or bronze cannon and is still used for casting large bells.

Loam (pronounced 'low-m') is a mixture of sand and clay with water, sometimes with horse dung (valuable for its straw content), animal hair or coke. The object of including dung or hair was to make the mould permeable and allow gas (such as steam) to escape during casting.

The mold for a cylindrically symmetrical object, such as a cannon, is built up in stages around a spindle, to which is fixed a strickle board with the shape of the eventual casting. The mold also has provision for the casting of a gunhead, beyond the muzzle of the cannon, into which slag can float during casting. If the object is to be hollow, a straw rope is wound around the spindle and covered in a friable material to the dimensions of the exterior of the cannon, the strickle board being turned on the spindle to ensure it is cylindrical. Decorative elements and models of the trunnions are then attached. This is then covered in a thick layer of loam. The mold is then fired. After this the straw rope is then pulled out with the rest of the material used to form the shape of the cannon.

The mould is then mounted vertically in a casting put in front of the furnace. If the cannon is to be cast hollow, a core is mounted in the mould. The furnace was then tapped and metal run into the mold. The mold is then broken off the casting. The gunhead is cut off, and the bore of the cannon reamed out using a boring mill.

The process for the cylinder for a steam engine would be similar. The process for casting a bell is of the same nature, but the procedure is necessarily different.
