= Ned Vincent =

English footballer

Personal information
- Full name: Norman Edwin Vincent
- Date of birth: 3 March 1909
- Place of birth: Prudhoe, England
- Date of death: 1980 (aged 70–71)
- Height: 5 ft 11 in (1.80 m)
- Position: Full-back

Senior career*
Years	Team	Apps	(Gls)
1926–1927	Prudhoe United		
1927–1928	Spennymoor United		
1928–1934	Stockport County	132	(20)
1934–1947	Grimsby Town	144	(2)
1947–194?	Stalybridge Celtic		
- * Club domestic league appearances and goals

Norman Edwin "Ned" Vincent (3 March 1909 – 1980) was an English professional footballer who played as a full-back in the Football League for Stockport County| and Grimsby Town.
