= Stephen Spargo =

English footballer

Personal information
- Full name: Stephen Spargo
- Date of birth: 29 December 1903
- Place of birth: Burnley, England
- Date of death: 1972 (aged 68)
- Place of death: Burnley, England
- Position: Half back

Senior career*
| Years | Team | Apps | (Gls) |
| 1925–1929 | Burnley | 3 | (0) |
| 1929–1930 | Nelson | 21 | (0) |
| 1930–1932 | Doncaster Rovers | 48 | (0) |
| 1932–1933 | York City | 35 | (0) |
| 1933–1934 | Rochdale | 4 | (0) |
| 1934–1935 | Burton Town | ? | (?) |
- * Club domestic league appearances and goals

Stephen Spargo (29 December 1903 – 1972) was an English professional association footballer who played as a half back. He usually played at centre-half, but was often deployed at wing-half throughout his career. Born in the town of Burnley, he initially played as an amateur in local league football before a move to hometown club Burnley in 1925. He spent four seasons in the Football League First Division with the club before moving to nearby Third Division North outfit Nelson in the summer of 1929. A transfer to Doncaster Rovers followed a year later. In 1932 he joined York City and later returned to Lancashire for a spell at Rochdale, before ending his career in non-league football with Burton Town.

== Biography ==
Stephen Spargo was born in Burnley, Lancashire on 29 December 1903. He remained in the area throughout his life, and died in the April quarter of 1972 at the age of 68.

== Football career ==
=== Burnley ===
Spargo started his career as an amateur with the Mount Olivet club in the Burnley Sunday League. In November 1924, he was signed by Football League First Division side Burnley on amateur terms, but he became a professional player the following month. At Burnley, Spargo played mostly in the reserve team, unable to take the place of England international Jack Hill in the starting eleven. Spargo made his senior debut on 13 February 1926, deputising for Hill in the 2–3 defeat away at Liverpool. He made another appearance exactly one month later, but was again on the losing side as the team were beaten 3–6 by Blackburn Rovers. Spargo played his next Burnley match over a year later in the 0–2 home loss against Birmingham City. He continued to feature regularly for the reserves, and was described by the Lancashire Daily Post Annual 1926–27 as one of the most promising centre-half backs in the Central League. Despite this, he never made another appearance for the Burnley first team and transferred to local Football League Third Division North club Nelson in July 1929.

=== Nelson ===
Spargo again initially found it difficult to break into the team, and was unable to take the place of former England international centre-half George Wilson. His Nelson debut came on 11 September 1929 when he played at right-wing half in the 0–1 defeat to Southport at Seedhill. The team's following match, a 3–1 home win against York City, was the first competitive victory that Spargo had played in during his career. After making two further appearances, he spent almost a month out of the side before being recalled to play at left-wing half in place of David Suttie in the 2–1 win away at Hartlepools United on 19 October 1929. A further seven league matches out of the team followed throughout November and December, before he returned to the starting line-up for the home victory over Rochdale on 14 January 1930. Towards the end of the campaign, Spargo made nine consecutive league appearances during March and April. His final game for Nelson was the 0–2 loss away to Wigan Borough on 21 April 1930.

=== Later career ===
Spargo was released by Nelson in the summer of 1930 and subsequently signed for Doncaster Rovers. He spent two seasons with the club, making a total of 48 league appearances before joining York City early in the 1932–33 campaign. He made his debut in 2–0 defeat at Stockport County on 5 September 1932 and he played 36 matches in all competitions for York but left at the end of the season, moving to Rochdale. He was restricted to only four league games with Rochdale and in September 1934 he moved into non-league football with Burton Town, his last senior club. He spent the 1934–35 season with Burton and on 24 November 1934 he played for them in a 5–1 victory over former club York City in the first round of the FA Cup.
