= Ronnie Dodd =

English footballer (1911–1955)

Personal information
- Date of birth: 25 April 1911
- Place of birth: Chester-le-Street, England
- Date of death: 1955 (aged 43–44)
- Height: 5 ft 10 1/2 in (1.79 m)
- Position(s): Centre forward

Senior career*
Years	Team	Apps	(Gls)
19??−1933	Usworth Colliery		
1933−1936	Doncaster Rovers	68	(38)
1936–1938	Walsall		
1938–1939	New Brighton		
- *Club domestic league appearances and goals

Ronnie Dodd (25 April 1911 − 1955) was an English footballer who played as a centre forward with Doncaster Rovers and Walsall in the Football League.

== Career ==
Born in Chester-le-Street, County Durham, he played for his local pit team, Usworth Colliery before moving to play with Division 3 North side Doncaster Rovers in 1933.

=== Doncaster Rovers ===
Dodd scored on his Rovers debut in 4–0 home win against Playing against Walsall on 9 September 1933. That season he was the club's top scorer with 24 goals in 34 League matches, including four against Gateshead, a ratio of one goal in 1.42 games.

The following season Doncaster were League Champions, with Dodd scoring 11 in 24 games. His centre forward position was taken over by Reg Baines in December with Dodd moving to play at inside right later in the season. During the 1935–36 season in Division 2 he only played three times, and did not score. The next season he scored three times in seven games as Doncaster were relegated.

He played in two international friendlies, first in December 1935 as Rovers entertained FC Austria from Vienna. In October of the following year he played in Doncaster's first match abroad against a Dutch National XI in Rotterdam.

His overall League scoring ratio for Doncaster was one goal in 1.79 games. He made 70 appearances in total, scoring 39 goals.

=== Walsall ===
In 1937, he was signed by Third Division South club Walsall.

=== New Brighton ===
In 1938, Dodd moved to Third Division North side New Brighton.

=== Wartime football ===
During the war players were allowed to make guest appearances for teams local to them to save on travel. Dodd turned out for his old club Doncaster as a guest in their first game in the East Midlands War League on 21 October 1939 in a 2–2 home draw with Sheffield Wednesday in front of a 6,006 crowd.

== Honours ==
Doncaster Rovers

- Division 3 North: 1934−35
