= Tom Smith (footballer, born 1911) =

English footballer (1911–1986)

Tom Stanley Smith (9 March 1911 – 1986) was an English footballer who played as a full back in the Football League for Rochdale and Luton Town, as well as in non league football for various other clubs.

He was born in Higham, Lancashire, and stood 5 ft 10 in (1.78 m) tall.
