= Peter Spooner =

English footballer

Personal information
- Full name: Peter Goodwill Spooner
- Date of birth: 30 August 1910
- Place of birth: Hepscott, Northumberland, England
- Date of death: 1987 (aged 76–77)
- Height: 5 ft 7 in (1.70 m)
- Position: Outside left

Senior career*
Years	Team	Apps	(Gls)
	Newbiggin United	?	(?)
1928–1929	Ashington	0	(0)
1929–1930	Newcastle United (trial)	0	(0)
1930–1931	Bradford Park Avenue	5	(1)
1931–1933	York City	57	(13)
1933–1935	Sheffield United	17	(2)
1935–1939	York City	132	(29)
1939	Gateshead	3	(2)
- * Club domestic league appearances and goals

Peter Goodwill Spooner (30 August 1910 – 1987) was an English footballer.

== Career ==
Spooner played for Newbiggin United before joining Ashington in 1928. He had trials with Newcastle United in 1929. He joined Bradford Park Avenue in 1930, making five appearances and scoring one goal in the league, before joining York City in the summer of 1931. He impressed at the club and joined Sheffield United for a fee of £500 in May 1993 after making 57 appearances and scoring 13 goals in the league. After making 17 appearances and scoring two goals in the league for the club, he returned to York in 1935. In the FA Cup in the 1937–38 season, he scored against Coventry City in the third round and the winner against Middlesbrough in the fifth round. He left the club in May 1939, after making 132 appearances and scoring 29 goals in the league, and joined Gateshead, for whom he made three appearances and scored two goals in the league.
