= Harry Waller (footballer, born 1902) =

English footballer

Personal information
- Date of birth: 2 May 1902
- Place of birth: Annfield Plain, County Durham, England
- Date of death: 1982 (aged 79–80)
- Position: Outside left

Senior career*
Years	Team	Apps	(Gls)
- Annfield Plain
1927–1928	Bury	0	(0)
1928–1932	Torquay United	114	(23)
1932–1935	Wrexham	93	(33)
1935	Wellington Town		
- * Club domestic league appearances and goals

Henry W. Waller (2 May 1902 – 1982) was an English professional footballer who played as an outside left. He made over 200 appearances in the English Football League between spells at Torquay United and Wrexham.
