= Fred Fitton =

English footballer

Personal information
- Full name: Frederick Fitton
- Date of birth: 12 January 1905
- Place of birth: Bury, England
- Date of death: 6 January 1965 (aged 59)
- Place of death: Newton-le-Willows, England
- Position: Centre forward

Senior career*
Years	Team	Apps	(Gls)
1928–1930	Burnley	15	(2)
1930–1932	Oldham Athletic	9	(4)
1932	Southend United	3	(1)
1932–1933	Accrington Stanley	45	(24)
1933–1934	Rochdale	13	(6)
	Nelson	?	(?)

Managerial career
- 1946–1948: Go Ahead
- * Club domestic league appearances and goals

Frederick Fitton (12 January 1905 – 6 January 1965) was an English professional association footballer who played as a centre forward for a number of teams in the Football League.

In 1946 he went to Deventer to coach Go Ahead.
