= George Beel =

English footballer

Personal information
- Full name: George William Beel
- Date of birth: 26 February 1900
- Place of birth: Bracebridge Heath, England
- Date of death: 30 December 1980 (aged 80)
- Height: 5 ft 8 1/2 in (1.74 m)
- Position: Centre forward

Senior career*
Years	Team	Apps	(Gls)
1919–1920	Lincoln City	23	(6)
1920–1922	Merthyr Town	54	(22)
1922–1923	Chesterfield	35	(23)
1923–1932	Burnley	316	(179)
1932–1933	Lincoln City	9	(6)
1933–1934	Rochdale	20	(8)
1933–1935	Tunbridge Wells Rangers		
Total		457	(244)
- * Club domestic league appearances and goals

George Beel (26 February 1900 – 30 December 1980) was a professional footballer who played as a centre forward. He holds Burnley's records for both the most league goals in a single season and the highest number of goals for the club.

During the First World War, Beel was based in Blackpool and would regularly play for the club in the Wartime league. During this period, he caught the attention of Manchester United and in 1919 they offered him a trial. He was not offered a contract and returned home to play for Lincoln City in October the same year. He scored 6 goals in 23 league games who then moved to South Wales after signing for Merthyr Town. He scored 22 goals in 54 appearances over two years in the newly formed Third Division South before crossing the border back to England, signing for newly promoted Chesterfield. Chesterfield scored 68 goals in 1922–23, finishing fourth in their debut season, with Beel finishing joint top scorer in the Third Division North with 23 goals in 35 games. Many First Division scouts watched Chesterfield matches, all interested in Beel. Burnley made their move and signed him in 1923, in time for him to play in the last game of the season. Here he would spend nine years, going onto score 188 goals in 337 appearances in all competitions for the Clarets. In six of those seasons, he would finish as the club's top scorer.

He scored 19 league goals in his first season, then scored 24 over the next two seasons before having his best spell. He found the net 24 times in the 1926–27 season and then the 1927–28 season saw Beel score 35 goals in 39 appearances, a club record for most goals in a season that still remains today. The next season he hit 30 goals in 41 matches, however the goals dried up in the 1929–30 season, managing only 10 in 33 games as Burnley suffered relegation.

Beel also had an impressive hat-trick record. He netted his first hat trick in a 5–1 home victory against West Ham United on 17 November 1923. He would have to wait until September 1926 before he scored another, in a 7–1 win away at Newcastle United at St James' Park. He only had to wait ten days this time before hitting another treble, at home against Bolton Wanderers. He netted another hat-trick at St James Park two years later, this time in a 7–2 win over Newcastle United.

He scored ten league hat-tricks as he scored 142 goals in 252 First Division matches. He would never play in the top flight again spending his last two seasons at Burnley in the Second Division, where he scored a further 37 goals. He scored his 11th and last hat-trick for Burnley in February 1931 against Wolves in a 4–2 home win.

He returned to Second Division Lincoln City, making nine league appearances and scoring six goals for the Imps after signing at the back end of the 1932–33 season. The following season he was back in the Third Division, this time at Rochdale in the Northern Division, where he scored 8 times in 20 league matches. He took the role of player-manager at non-League Tunbridge Wells Rangers and remained there the following season before retiring. Beel had scored 244 league goals in 457 league appearances in his career. He later became the manager of Maidstone United, remaining with the Kent club in various capacities, including junior coaching, until his death on 30 December 1980, aged 80.

== Career statistics ==
Club performance			League		Cup		Total	
Season	Club	League	Apps	Goals	Apps	Goals	Apps	Goals
England			League		FA Cup		Total	
1919–20	Lincoln City	Second Division	23	6				
Career total			23	6				
1920–21	Merthyr Town	Third Division	55	22				
Career total			55	22				
1921–22	Chesterfield	Third Division						
1922–23	Chesterfield	Third Division						
Career total			35	23				
1922–23	Burnley	First Division	1	—	—	—	—	—
1923–24	Burnley	First Division	34	19	7	2	41	21
1924–25	Burnley	First Division	35	10	1	—	36	10
1925–26	Burnley	First Division	33	14	2	2	35	16
1926–27	Burnley	First Division	36	24	3	3	39	27
1927–28	Burnley	First Division	39	35	1	—	40	35
1928–29	Burnley	First Division	41	30	3	2	44	32
1929–30	Burnley	First Division	33	10	1	—	34	10
1930–31	Burnley	Second Division	41	25	2	—	43	25
1931–32	Burnley	Second Division	23	12	1	—	24	12
Career total			316	179	21	9	337	188
1932–33	Lincoln City	Second Division	9	6				
Career total			9	6				
1932–33	Rochdale	Third Division North	20	8				
Career total			20	8				
Career total			458	243				
