= Bill Watson (footballer, born 1899) =

English footballer

Personal information
- Full name: William Thomas Watson
- Date of birth: 16 March 1899
- Place of birth: Morpeth, England
- Date of death: 1969 (aged 69–70)
- Position: Forward

Senior career*
| Years | Team | Apps | (Gls) |
| 19xx–1923 | Blyth Spartans | ? | (?) |
| 1923–1928 | Ashington | 200 | (36) |
| 1928–1932 | Carlisle United | 141 | (38) |
| 1932–1933 | Rochdale | 39 | (12) |
| 1933–1934 | Accrington Stanley | 25 | (3) |
- * Club domestic league appearances and goals

William Thomas Watson (16 March 1899 – 1969) was an English professional footballer who played as a left-sided forward. He made 405 appearances and scored 89 goals in the Football League for four clubs.
