= Billy Benton =

English footballer

Personal information
- Full name: William Henry Benton
- Date of birth: 5 December 1895
- Place of birth: Walsall, England
- Date of death: 1967 (aged 71–72)
- Height: 5 ft 8 1/2 in (1.74 m)
- Position: Midfielder

Senior career*
Years	Team	Apps	(Gls)
- Walsall
1920–1931	Blackpool	353	(24)
- Fleetwood Town
1932–1933	Rochdale	48	(8)
1933–36	Rossendale United	52	(8)
- * Club domestic league appearances and goals

William Henry Benton (5 December 1895 – 1967) was an English professional footballer. He spent eleven years at Blackpool in the 1920s and 1930s, making over 350 Football League appearances for the club. He played in midfield.

Benton made his debut for Blackpool on 30 August 1920, in the second league game of the 1920–21 season, a 2–1 defeat at home to Bristol City. He went on to appear in 39 of the club's 42 league games that campaign, scoring six goals, including a hat-trick in only his third appearance for Bill Norman's men — a 4–0 home victory over Coventry City on 11 September. Benton's other three strikes all came in Blackpool victories.

Benton was a regular in the team in all but his final three seasons with Blackpool. He made his final appearance for the club, then under the guidance of Harry Evans, on 7 February 1931, in a 6–0 defeat at Leicester City.
