= Jack Gordon (footballer, born 1911) =

English footballer (1911–?)

Jack Gordon (born 25 September 1911) was an English footballer who played as a wing half for Rochdale, as well as non-league football for various other clubs, including Leeds United reserve team.
