= George Whyte =

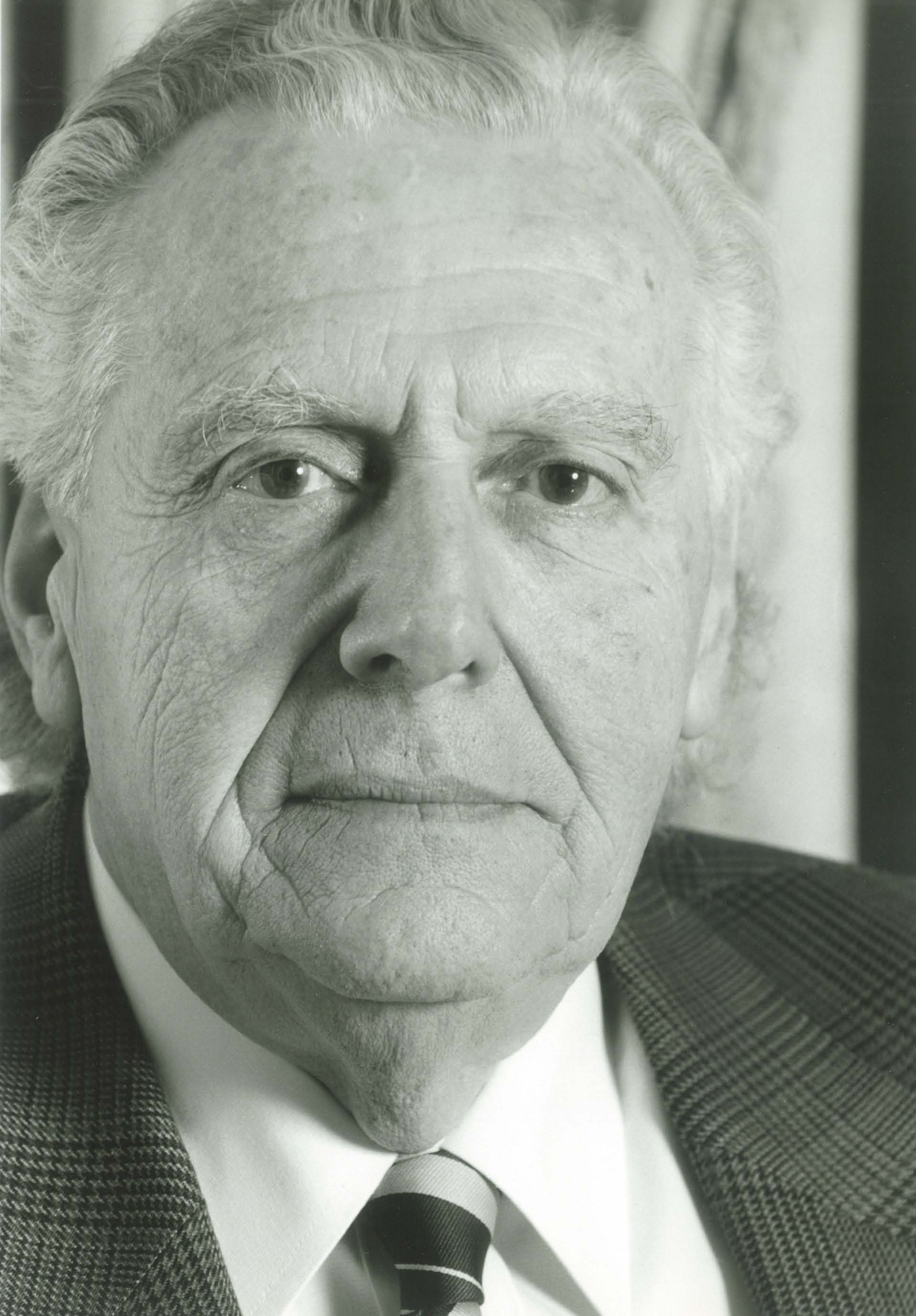
- Born: 11 July 1933; Budapest
- Died: 31 August 2012 (aged 79); London
- Occupations: Author and Composer

George R. Whyte (born 11 July 1933 in Budapest; died 31 August 2012 in London) was an author, composer, dramatist and art collector. His early education was at Highgate Junior School. A British national of Hungarian Jewish extraction, the Holocaust and the loss of many members of his family in Auschwitz have influenced his creative works which have increasingly focused on the struggle against social injustices especially racism.

== Career ==
A world authority on the Dreyfus Affair, his Dreyfus Trilogy, created for the Dreyfus Centenary in 1994 has been widely performed and televised. Making extensive use of archival material, he has evolved a powerful dramatic style defined by Götz Friedrich as a 'Protokol für das Musiktheater' wherein the drama is heightened by opposing texts, repeatedly sung and declaimed, which confront the listener with an escalation of the moral conflict. His literary work 'The Dreyfus Affair – A Chronological History' (publ. Palgrave Macmillan, 2006) is recognized as the major reference book on the subject.

His latest creation 'Golem 13' was the cultural highlight of the Czech Presidency of the European Union (June 2009). It was premiered at the National Theatre of Prague and commemorated the 400th anniversary of the death of Rabbi Loew, the Maharal, credited with the creation of the Golem of Prague to defend the Jews of the Ghetto. In Golem 13, a Kabbalistic Drama in 2 Acts, (set to music by Noam Sheriff), Whyte dares a balancing act between the past and the future. The first act takes place in the 16th century, the second act, in the future, 500 years later, when the Jewish people, threatened once again, create Golem 13 for their protection. In this visionary work, there appears on the operatic stage, for the first time, a superhuman being composed of Kabbalistic spirituality and advanced technology, to be of eventual significance to all of mankind.

Whyte readily collaborates with other composers and artistic talents and constructs his work so that it is adaptable for stage, television and radio. His administrative experience in the performing arts has contributed to the evolution of an artistic legacy largely devoted to the commemoration of the injustices suffered by the Jewish people.

George Whyte was inter alia Chairman of the British National Export Council for the Arts (1967–1973); founder member of the international committee of the Artur Rubinstein Piano Competition (1976–1988) and Chairman of the Royal Opera House 'The Holocaust A Commemoration in Music' (1987/88). Since 1988 Whyte he has been the Chairman of cultural events at 'Remembering for the Future' (London). For over 20 years he has researched the Dreyfus Affair which has made him a world authority on the subject. Since 1998 he has been Chairman of the Dreyfus Society for Human Rights (London and Bonn).

== Publications ==
George R. Whyte's works have been published by (inter alia) Palgrave Macmillan (UK and US), Inter Nationes, Artial and Coda Editions; distributed by Boosey & Hawkes Bote and Bock Berlin; his stage works have been premiered by the Deutsche Oper Berlin, Oper der Stadt Bonn, Theater Basel, New York City Opera, Opernhaus Zürich, Jüdisches Museum Berlin, National Theatre Prague and broadcast on numerous TV channels and radio networks, including WDR, Channel 4, CBS, France Culture, BBC, Sweden STV1, Slovenia RTV, SLO, Finland YLE and Hungary MTV .

== Works by George Whyte ==
=== Literary (selective list) ===
- 'Set for Enterprise', Study for the Royal Opera House, London 1986,
- 'The Dreyfus Centenary Bulletin', The Dreyfus Centenary Committee, London/Bonn 1994,
- 'Oper am Scheideweg- Dreyfus Die Affäre- Ein Protokoll für das Musiktheater', Deutsche Oper Berlin Yearbook, S. 167–176, 1994,
- 'L´Affaire en Chansons', Dictionnaire de l'Affaire Dreyfus de A à Z, Flammarion, 1994; Musée d’histoire Contemporaine – BDIC Paris 1994,
- 'Le Prix d´Illusion', Revue Juive, Geneva, 2 June 1995,
- 'Un bilan du centenaire de l'Affaire Dreyfus', Cahier Jean Jaurès, Paris, 1995,
- 'The Accused- The Dreyfus Trilogy', Secolo Verlag/Inter Nationes Bonn, 1996, ISBN 3-929979-28-4,
- 'Von Berlin zum Broadway' oder 'Die Affäre Dreyfus als Rorschach-Test', Die Welt, 21 December 1996,
- 'The Dreyfus Affair - A Chronological History', Palgrave Macmillan, London and New York, 2006, ISBN 978-0-230-20285-6,
- 'Dreyfus Intime' Artial 2008 (in English, German, French, Hebrew, Hungarian). In Czech, Czech Theatre Institute, Translations by the Goethe Institute,
- 'Admission is not acceptance – Reflections on the Dreyfus Affair' Antisemitism, London Valentine Mitchell, 2007; Paris: French, Edition Le Manuscript/UNESCO 2008; Spanish: Buenos Aires Lilmod 2009; Russian: Moscow Xonokoct, 2010,
- 'Die Dreyfus Affaere - Die Macht des Vorurteils', Peter Lang, Frankfurt, 2010, ISBN 978-3-631-60218-8
- 'The Dreyfus Affair - A Trilogy of Plays', Oberon Books, London, January 2011.

=== Stage, television and radio (selective list) ===
- 'AJIOM/Captain Dreyfus – A Jew in Our Midst' Musical in 2 acts, 1989,
- 'The Dreyfus Trilogy' (in collaboration with Jost Meier, Alfred Schnittke and Luciano Berio) comprising

- 'Dreyfus – Die Affäre' opera in 2 acts, Deutsche Oper, Berlin, 8 May 1994; Theater Basel, 16 October 1994; 'The Dreyfus Affair' New York City Opera, 2 April 1996,
- 'Dreyfus-J’Accuse' – Danced drama, Oper der Stadt Bonn, 4 September 1994; television: Sweden STV1, Slovenia RTV, SLO, Finland YLE,
- 'Rage et Outrage' Musical satire, Arte, April 1994; 'Rage and Outrage', Channel 4, May 1994, 'Zorn und Schande', Arte 1994,

- 'J’Accuse' Travelling Exhibition, Curator Sarah Nathan-Davis, Berlin, Basel, New York 1994–1996,
- 'My burning Protest', monologue for speaker and percussion, 1996,
- 'Dreyfus in Opera and Ballet/The Odyssey of George Whyte'(German/English) September 1995, WDR, Sweden STV1, Hungary MTV and Finland YLE,
- 'J’Accuse', radio documentary, Canadian Broadcasting Service (CBS – 10 October 1998),
- 'Cabaret in Exile', (German and English - with songs of World War II) 2008,
- 'Dreyfus Intime', Opernhaus Zürich, 22 December 2007, Jüdisches Museum, Berlin, 6 May 2009,
- 'Golem 13' Kabbalistic drama in 2 acts, (set to music by Noam Sheriff), National Theatre Prague, 29 June 2009,
- He commissioned the Australian composer George Dreyfus (no relation) to write Dreyfus, Dreyfus, Dreyfus, an "action" for mezzo-soprano, tenor, baritone, chorus and orchestra, based on anti-Dreyfusard street songs; it was premiered in Melbourne in March 2013, seven months after Whyte's death

=== Bibliography - selective (international) list ===
- P. Stoop:'Das graue exorzieren', Der Tagesspiegel, Berlin 10 April 1994,
- ZDF TV, television interview, Berlin, 2 May 1994,
- 'La Belle Affaire', radio interview, RSR1 Lausanne, 11 August 1994,
- C.R. Whitney: 'Dreyfus is not forgotten, not in Berlin anyway', New York Times, 5 October 1994,
- S. Nathan-Davis: 'Alfred Dreyfus – gestern und heute', Jüdische Rundschau, Basel, 13 October 1994,
- M. Handelsatz: 'Dreyfus', Ha’aretz, Tel Aviv, 14 October 1994,
- 'L’Affaire Dreyfus', radio interview, France Culture, 25 March 1995,
- J. Gabai: 'Dreyfus mis en Scene – La Trilogie de George Whyte', Petit Palais, Geneva, May 1995,
- 'Maurizio Costanzo', television interview, Canale 5, Rome, 16 January 1998,
- J. Frazer: 'Accusative Case', Jewish Chronicle, London 18 March 2005,
- J. Tobin: 'His sole crime was to be a Jew', Jewish Ledger, Hartford, US, 5 April 1996,
- Ingo Way: 'Wir steuern auf eine Katastrophe zu', Jüdische Allgemeine, Berlin, 8 February 2007,
- George Whyte: 'L’Histoire d’un officier français', L’Arche, Paris, February 2007,
- E. Wild: Die Dreyfus Affäre ist unsterblich – Gespräch mit George Whyte, Neue Zürcher Zeitung (NZZ), Zürich, Zürcher Kultur, 22 January 2008,
- Jana Machalick: 'Whyte's Golem 13 examines the roots of injustice', Lidove Noviny, Prague, 29 June 2009,
