= George Flowers (footballer) =

English footballer

Personal information
- Full name: George Alfred Flowers
- Date of birth: 7 May 1907
- Place of birth: Darlaston, Staffordshire, England
- Date of death: July 1991 (aged 84)
- Place of death: Rochdale, England
- Height: 5 ft 9 in (1.75 m)
- Position: Half back

Senior career*
Years	Team	Apps	(Gls)
−1927	Edlington Colliery Welfare		
1927–1935	Doncaster Rovers	149	(7)
1935–1937	Bradford Park Avenue		
1937–1939	Tranmere Rovers	45	(1)
1939–1940	Rochdale		
- * Club domestic league appearances and goals

George Alfred Flowers (7 May 1907 – 17 July 1991) was an English footballer, born in Darlaston, Staffordshire. He played as a half back in the Football League between 1929 and 1940.

He first played for Edlington Colliery Welfare before being picked up by Doncaster Rovers in 1927 where he spent most of his professional career with 161 total appearances. He later played for Bradford Park Avenue, Tranmere Rovers and Rochdale.

One nephew, Ron Flowers, played for England (1955–1966) and Wolverhampton Wanderers (1952–1967) and Ron's brother, John Flowers, played for Doncaster, Stoke City and Port Vale. His niece-in-law, through John, was former darts world champion Maureen Flowers.

He died in Rochdale in 1991.

== Honours ==
Doncaster Rovers

- Third Division North

Champions 1934–35
