= George Frewin =

English footballer

Personal information
- Full name: George William Frewin
- Date of birth: 6 February 1907
- Place of birth: Fulham, England
- Position: Inside forward

Senior career*
| Years | Team | Apps | (Gls) |
- Fulham
- Belfast Celtic
| 1932–1936 | Wrexham | 88 | (31) |
- Venner Sports
- * Club domestic league appearances and goals

George William Frewin (6 February 1907 – date of death unknown) was an English professional footballer who played as an inside forward. He made appearances in the English Football League with Wrexham.
