= Ted Hathway =

English footballer

Personal information
- Full name: Edward Albert Hathway
- Place of birth: Bristol, England
- Height: 5 ft 9 in (1.75 m)
- Positions: Inside left; left half; right half

Senior career*
Years	Team	Apps	(Gls)
1930–1931	Bristol City	0	(0)
1931–1932	Bristol Rovers	0	(0)
1932–1933	Bolton Wanderers	0	(0)
1933–1939	York City	221	(28)
- * Club domestic league appearances and goals

Edward Albert Hathway was an English footballer. He was born in Bristol, England.

== Career ==
Hathway started his career with Bristol City in 1930, but joined Bristol Rovers in 1931 after making no league appearances for City. He then moved to Bolton Wanderers in 1932 after making no league appearances for Rovers. He joined York City in June 1933. He made a total of 239 appearances and scored 40 goals for the club and returned to Bristol following the outbreak of war. He received a benefit from the club in recognition of his services in 1943.
