= Ben Wheelhouse =

English footballer

Personal information
- Full name: Ben Wheelhouse
- Date of birth: 23 September 1902
- Place of birth: Rothwell, England
- Date of death: 1985 (aged 82–83)
- Height: 5 ft 8 in (1.73 m)
- Position: Defender

Senior career*
Years	Team	Apps	(Gls)
- Rothwell Haig Colliery
- Rothwell Athletic
- Rothwell Haig Colliery
1922–1924	Halifax Town	24	(0)
1924–1925	Burnley	13	(0)
1925–1926	Denaby United		
1926–1932	Halifax Town	165	(4)
1932–1934	Rochdale	66	(2)
1934–193?	Denaby United		
- * Club domestic league appearances and goals

Ben Wheelhouse (23 September 1902 – 1985) was an English footballer who played as a defender in the Football League in the 1920s and 1930s.

His clubs included Halifax Town and Rochdale.
