= Will Rigby (footballer) =

English footballer (1906–1977)

William Rigby (4 September 1906 – 1977) was an English footballer who played as a winger for Wigan Borough, Stockport County and Rochdale. He also played non-league football for various other clubs, including the newly formed Peterborough United, where he had the distinction of being the first ever scorer for the club.
