= Albert Malam =

English footballer

Personal information
- Date of birth: 20 January 1913
- Place of birth: Liverpool, England
- Date of death: February 1992
- Height: 5 ft 6 in (1.68 m)
- Position: Midfielder

Senior career*
Years	Team	Apps	(Gls)
- Chesterfield
1934–1935	Huddersfield Town	21	(11)
1935–1945	Doncaster Rovers	95	(26)
1945–?	Wrexham		
- * Club domestic league appearances and goals

Albert Malam (20 January 1913 – February 1992) was a former professional footballer, who played for Everton, Colwyn Bay, Chesterfield, Huddersfield Town, Wrexham and Doncaster Rovers. During the Second World War he played for Manchester City, Crewe and New Brighton. Became player-manager of Runcorn in the Cheshire League after leaving Wrexham. He was the father of Colin Malam, former football correspondent of The Sunday Telegraph and author.

== Honours ==
Doncaster Rovers

- Third Division North

Runner up 1937–38
