= Gilbert Alsop =

English footballer

Personal information
- Full name: Gilbert Arthur Alsop
- Date of birth: 22 September 1908
- Place of birth: Frampton Cotterell, England
- Date of death: 16 April 1992 (aged 83)
- Place of death: Walsall, England
- Height: 5 ft 6 in (1.68 m)
- Position: Forward

Youth career
- ?–1927: Latteridge

Senior career*
Years	Team	Apps	(Gls)
1927–1929	Bath City		
1929–1931	Coventry City	16	(4)
1931–1935	Walsall	160	(126)
1935–1937	West Bromwich Albion	1	(0)
1937–1938	Ipswich Town	39	(30)
1938–1948	Walsall	106	(68)
Total		322	(228)
- * Club domestic league appearances and goals

Gilbert Arthur Alsop (22 September 1908 – 16 April 1992) was an English professional footballer who played as a forward in the Football League for Coventry City, Walsall, West Bromwich Albion and Ipswich Town.

== Early life ==
Alsop was born in Frampton Cotterell, Gloucestershire to Arthur George Alsop, a coal miner, and Florence Caroline Alsop (née Thornell). He had three older siblings; Frederick, Hilda and Arthur.

After leaving school, he signed for local amateur side Latteridge for a time, before signing for Southern League Bath City in August 1927.

== Professional career ==
In December 1929 he moved to Football League Third Division South side Coventry City on professional terms. He spent two seasons with the Sky Blues but failed to gain a regular starting place, making only 16 league appearances and scoring four times.

He started the first of two very successful spells at Walsall in September 1931, scoring on his debut in a 2–0 win over Doncaster Rovers. He went on to score 15 times in his first season with the Saddlers. In January 1933 he scored the opening goal in Walsall's 2–0 win over Herbert Chapman's Arsenal in the FA Cup. A result still regarded as one of the greatest FA Cup upsets of all-time.

After a remarkable scoring return of 40 goals in all competitions in 1933–34 and 48 goals in all competitions in 1934–35, Alsop attracted the attention of clubs further up the league and moved to First Division West Bromwich Albion in November 1935. However, Alsop found his first team opportunities were severely limited by the form of W. G. Richardson and Harry Jones, managing only one league appearance for the club in his two seasons at The Hawthorns.

Alsop signed for Ipswich Town in May 1937 and scored 30 goals in 39 senior matches in the Southern League and the Third Division South. He scored in Ipswich's first ever match in the Football League – a 4–2 victory over Southend United in August 1938.

He returned to Walsall in October 1938 and, despite the outbreak of war, made a further 106 appearances and continued his prolific goalscoring form for the Midlands side. He played his last full season at Fellows Park as player-coach to Walsall's third team in 1947–48, before eventually retiring in May 1948. In all competitions, Alsop played 324 times for Walsall and scored 226 goals.

== Later life ==
Alsop worked behind the scenes at Fellows Park for a further 20 years or so after retiring and later became groundsman of the playing fields adjoining Walsall Arboretum. He was still attending home games at Bescot Stadium, right up to his death in April 1992 at the age of 83.
