= Bunny Bell =

English footballer

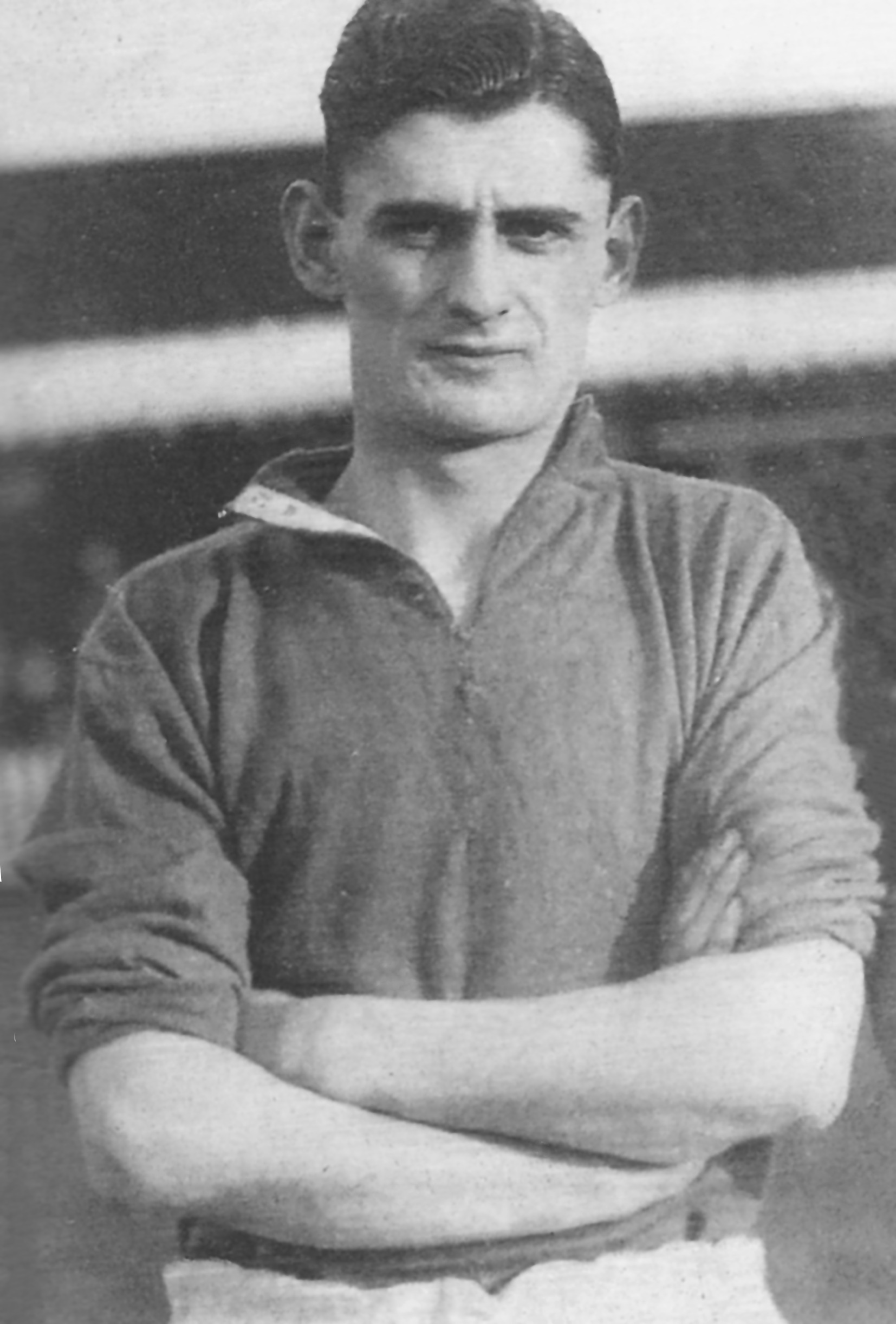
- Bell in 1935

Personal information
- Date of birth: 10 April 1911
- Place of birth: Birkenhead, England
- Date of death: 25 December 1988 (aged 77)
- Place of death: Todmorden, England
- Height: 5 ft 10 1/2 in (1.79 m)
- Position: Centre forward

Senior career*
Years	Team	Apps	(Gls)
–1930	Carlton		
1930–1936	Tranmere Rovers	114	(102)
1936–1939	Everton	14	(6)
Total		108	(108)
- * Club domestic league appearances and goals

Robert C. "Bunny" Bell (10 April 1911 – 25 December 1988) was an English footballer who played for Carlton, Tranmere Rovers and Everton.

On Boxing Day 1935, he scored nine times in Tranmere's 13–4 victory over Oldham Athletic, at that time an English record. He might have made it 10, but missed a penalty. He scored 57 goals for Tranmere during the 1933–34 season, and ended his Tranmere career with 104 goals in 114 games. Bell then signed for Everton, but the outbreak of World War II effectively ended his career.
