= 1935–36 Rochdale A.F.C. season =

English football club season

Rochdale
1935–36 season
- Manager: Billy Smith; Ernest Nixon
- Stadium: Spotland Stadium
- Football League Third Division North: 20th
- FA Cup: 1st Round
- Top goalscorer: League: Joe Wiggins (14); All: Joe Wiggins (14)

The 1935–36 season was Rochdale A.F.C.'s 29th in existence and their 15th in the Football League Third Division North.

== Squad Statistics ==
=== Appearances and goals ===
No.	Pos	Nat	Player	Total		Division 3 North		FA Cup		Division 3 North Cup	
No.	Pos	Nat	Player	Apps	Goals	Apps	Goals	Apps	Goals	Apps	Goals
	GK	(England) ENG	Billy Baker	40	0	38	0	1	0	1	0
	DF	(England) ENG	Albert Worthy	43	2	41	1	1	0	1	1
	DF	(Wales) WAL	Gwyn Jones	40	0	38	0	1	0	1	0
	MF	(England) ENG	Edward Huntley	26	0	24	0	1	0	1	0
	DF	(England) ENG	George Wyness	38	0	37	0	1	0	0	0
	DF	(England) ENG	Walter Buckley	38	1	37	1	0	0	1	0
	FW	(England) ENG	George Emmerson	36	3	35	3	1	0	0	0
	FW	(England) ENG	Joe Duff	33	11	31	10	1	0	1	1
	FW	(England) ENG	Joe Wiggins	27	14	27	14	0	0	0	0
	FW	(England) ENG	Harry Marshall	31	9	31	9	0	0	0	0
	FW	(England) ENG	Bert Hales	40	4	38	4	1	0	1	0
	MF	(England) ENG	Fred Taylor	7	3	6	3	0	0	1	0
	MF	(England) ENG	Matt Johnson	17	6	15	5	1	0	1	1
	FW	(England) ENG	Sidney Elliott	11	1	11	1	0	0	0	0
	MF	(England) ENG	Sam Skaife	17	0	16	0	1	0	0	0
	MF		Stanley Taylor	2	0	2	0	0	0	0	0
	MF	(England) ENG	Harry Brierley	11	0	10	0	0	0	1	0
	FW	(England) ENG	Cliff Eaton	16	2	14	2	1	0	1	0
	FW	(England) ENG	Arthur Emerson	1	0	1	0	0	0	0	0
	DF	(England) ENG	Frank Huxley	1	0	1	0	0	0	0	0
	GK	(England) ENG	Robert Driver	2	0	2	0	0	0	0	0
	FW	(England) ENG	Len Clarke	5	4	5	4	0	0	0	0
	GK	(England) ENG	Christopher Cornthwaite	2	0	2	0	0	0	0	0
	DF	(England) ENG	Reg Cook	0	0	0	0	0	0	0	0

Squad Statistics (Non-competitive)

=== Appearances and goals (Non-competitive) ===
No.	Pos	Nat	Player	Total		Lancashire Cup	
No.	Pos	Nat	Player	Apps	Goals	Apps	Goals
	GK	(England) ENG	Billy Baker	1	0	1	0
	DF	(England) ENG	Albert Worthy	0	0	0	0
	DF	(Wales) WAL	Gwyn Jones	1	0	1	0
	MF	(England) ENG	Edward Huntley	0	0	0	0
	DF	(England) ENG	George Wyness	0	0	0	0
	DF	(England) ENG	Walter Buckley	0	0	0	0
	FW	(England) ENG	George Emmerson	1	0	1	0
	FW	(England) ENG	Joe Duff	1	0	1	0
	FW	(England) ENG	Joe Wiggins	1	1	1	1
	FW	(England) ENG	Harry Marshall	0	0	0	0
	FW	(England) ENG	Bert Hales	1	0	1	0
	MF	(England) ENG	Fred Taylor	0	0	0	0
	MF	(England) ENG	Matt Johnson	0	0	0	0
	FW	(England) ENG	Sidney Elliott	0	0	0	0
	MF	(England) ENG	Sam Skaife	1	0	1	0
	MF		Stanley Taylor	1	0	1	0
	MF	(England) ENG	Harry Brierley	1	0	1	0
	FW	(England) ENG	Cliff Eaton	1	0	1	0
	FW	(England) ENG	Arthur Emerson	0	0	0	0
	DF	(England) ENG	Frank Huxley	0	0	0	0
	GK	(England) ENG	Robert Driver	0	0	0	0
	FW	(England) ENG	Len Clarke	0	0	0	0
	GK	(England) ENG	Christopher Cornthwaite	0	0	0	0
	DF	(England) ENG	Reg Cook	1	0	1	0

== Final league table ==
Pos	Team	Pld	W	D	L	GF	GA	GAv	Pts	Promotion or relegation
18	Wrexham	42	15	7	20	66	75	0.880	37	
19	Mansfield Town	42	14	9	19	80	91	0.879	37	
20	Rochdale	42	10	13	19	58	88	0.659	33	
21	Southport	42	11	9	22	48	90	0.533	31	Re-elected
22	New Brighton	42	9	6	27	43	102	0.422	24	Re-elected

Source: rsssf.com

== Competitions ==
=== Football League Third Division North ===
31 August 1935 1	Rochdale	2–1	Crewe Alexandra	Rochdale
	Marshall; Hales	Report	Wood	Stadium: Spotland Stadium; Attendance: 9036

2 September 1935 2	Stockport County	4–0	Rochdale	Stockport
	Brennan; Tidman; McNaughton	Report		Stadium: Edgeley Park; Attendance: 11919

7 September 1935 3	Accrington Stanley	2–4	Rochdale	Accrington
	Brown; Mortimer	Report	Marshall; Johnson; F. Taylor	Stadium: Peel Park; Attendance: 4212

10 September 1935 4	Rochdale	1–1	Stockport County	Rochdale
	F. Taylor	Report	Robinson	Stadium: Spotland Stadium; Attendance: 10238

14 September 1935 5	Rochdale	2–1	Southport	Rochdale
	F. Taylor; Marshall	Report	Savage	Stadium: Spotland Stadium; Attendance: 5605

21 September 1935 6	Chester	5–2	Rochdale	Chester
	Wrightson; Williams; Cresswell	Report	Buckley; Marshall	Stadium: Sealand Road; Attendance: 6914

28 September 1935 7	Rochdale	0–0	Lincoln City	Rochdale
		Report		Stadium: Spotland Stadium; Attendance: 7052

5 October 1935 8	Halifax Town	2–0	Rochdale	Halifax
	Barkas; Valentine	Report		Stadium: The Shay; Attendance: 7396

12 October 1935 9	York City	2–1	Rochdale	York
	Green; Speed	Report	Marshall	Stadium: Bootham Crescent; Attendance: 4487

19 October 1935 10	Rochdale	2–6	Oldham Athletic	Rochdale
	Worthy; Duff	Report	Leedham; Buckley; Brunskill; Agar	Stadium: Spotland Stadium; Attendance: 4985

26 October 1935 11	Wrexham	0–1	Rochdale	Wrexham
		Report	Duff	Stadium: Racecourse Ground; Attendance: 4063

2 November 1935 12	Rochdale	1–1	Rotherham United	Rochdale
	Marshall	Report	Fenoughty	Stadium: Spotland Stadium; Attendance: 5786

9 November 1935 13	Mansfield Town	3–0	Rochdale	Mansfield
	Harston; Lockie; Clenshaw	Report		Stadium: Field Mill; Attendance: 4762

16 November 1935 14	Rochdale	0–1	Hartlepools United	Rochdale
		Report	Bonass	Stadium: Spotland Stadium; Attendance: 4878

23 November 1935 15	Carlisle United	4–3	Rochdale	Carlisle
	Williams; Taylor; Mantle	Report	Eaton; Hales	Stadium: Brunton Park; Attendance: 6029

7 December 1935 16	Tranmere Rovers	5–2	Rochdale	Birkenhead
	MacDonald; Urmson; Bell	Report	Wiggins	Stadium: Prenton Park; Attendance: 5657

14 December 1935 17	Rochdale	5–0	Gateshead	Rochdale
	Wiggins; Clarke	Report		Stadium: Spotland Stadium; Attendance: 2966

21 December 1935 18	Darlington	4–0	Rochdale	Darlington
	Alderson; Towers	Report		Stadium: Feethams; Attendance: 3422

25 December 1935 19	Rochdale	1–1	Barrow	Rochdale
	Wiggins	Report	Hopkinson	Stadium: Spotland Stadium; Attendance: 5031

26 December 1935 20	Barrow	6–2	Rochdale	Barrow-in-Furness
	Baker; Rowbotham; Reid	Report	Wiggins; G. Emmerson	Stadium: Holker Street; Attendance: 4383

28 December 1935 21	Crewe Alexandra	3–1	Rochdale	Crewe
	Waring; Rigby; Swindells	Report	Elliott	Stadium: Gresty Road; Attendance: 4856

1 January 1936 22	Chesterfield	2–2	Rochdale	Chesterfield
	Dando	Report	Johnson	Stadium: Saltergate Recreation Ground; Attendance: 11138

4 January 1936 23	Rochdale	2–2	Accrington Stanley	Rochdale
	Duff; Johnson (pen.)	Report	Mortimer; Harker	Stadium: Spotland Stadium; Attendance: 4822

18 January 1936 24	Southport	1–1	Rochdale	Southport
	Baker (o.g.)	Report	Wiggins	Stadium: Haig Avenue; Attendance: 2475

25 January 1936 25	Rochdale	1–1	Chester	Rochdale
	Eaton	Report	Cresswell (pen.)	Stadium: Spotland Stadium; Attendance: 4420

1 February 1936 26	Lincoln City	5–1	Rochdale	Lincoln
	Goal	Report	Clarke	Stadium: Sincil Bank; Attendance: 4835

8 February 1936 27	Rochdale	2–0	Halifax Town	Rochdale
	Duff; Williams (o.g.)	Report		Stadium: Spotland Stadium; Attendance: 4309

15 February 1936 28	Rochdale	2–3	York City	Rochdale
	Wiggins	Report	Goal	Stadium: Spotland Stadium; Attendance: 4670

22 February 1936 29	Oldham Athletic	3–3	Rochdale	Oldham
	Duff; Marshall	Report	Goal	Stadium: Boundary Park; Attendance: 6051

29 February 1936 30	Rochdale	3–1	Mansfield Town	Rochdale
	Duff; Wiggins	Report	Harston	Stadium: Spotland Stadium; Attendance: 2227

7 March 1936 31	Rotherham United	6–0	Rochdale	Rotherham
	Bastow; Hardy; Dickinson	Report		Stadium: Millmoor; Attendance: 2957

14 March 1936 32	Rochdale	2–1	Wrexham	Rochdale
	Wiggins	Report	MacCartney (pen.)	Stadium: Spotland Stadium; Attendance: 3307

21 March 1936 33	Hartlepools United	1–0	Rochdale	Hartlepool
	George Harris	Report		Stadium: Victoria Park; Attendance: 4110

28 March 1936 34	Rochdale	0–0	Carlisle United	Rochdale
		Report		Stadium: Spotland Stadium; Attendance: 3722

31 March 1936 35	Rochdale	6–4	Walsall	Rochdale
	Duff; Wiggins; Marshall; G. Emmerson	Report	Woolhouse; Evans; Smith	Stadium: Spotland Stadium; Attendance: 1942

4 April 1936 36	Walsall	1–0	Rochdale	Walsall
	Wood	Report		Stadium: Fellows Park; Attendance: 3396

10 April 1936 37	New Brighton	2–0	Rochdale	New Brighton
	Ainsworth	Report		Stadium: Sandheys Park; Attendance: 3299

11 April 1936 38	Rochdale	0–0	Tranmere Rovers	Rochdale
		Report		Stadium: Spotland Stadium; Attendance: 5760

13 April 1936 39	Rochdale	1–0	New Brighton	Rochdale
	Hales	Report		Stadium: Spotland Stadium; Attendance: 4124

18 April 1936 40	Gateshead	1–0	Rochdale	Gateshead
	Mathison	Report		Stadium: Redheugh Park; Attendance: 1996

25 April 1936 41	Rochdale	1–1	Darlington	Rochdale
	Marshall	Report	Alderson	Stadium: Spotland Stadium; Attendance: 2927

2 May 1936 42	Rochdale	1–1	Chesterfield	Rochdale
	G. Emmerson	Report	Brown	Stadium: Spotland Stadium; Attendance: 3551

=== FA Cup ===
30 November 1935 1	Halifax Town	4–0	Rochdale	Halifax
	Betteridge; Barkas	Report		Stadium: The Shay; Attendance: 7431

=== Third Division North Cup ===
1 October 1935 1	Oldham Athletic	6–3	Rochdale	Oldham
	Buckley; Jones; Schofield; Walsh; Chambers (pen.)		Worthy; Duff; Johnson	Stadium: Boundary Park; Attendance: 967

=== Lancashire Cup ===
23 September 1935 1	New Brighton	3–1	Rochdale	New Brighton
	Goal		Wiggins	Stadium: Sandheys Park
