= 1934–35 Rochdale A.F.C. season =

English football club season

Rochdale
1934–35 season
- Manager: Billy Smith
- Stadium: Spotland Stadium
- Football League Third Division North: 20th
- FA Cup: 1st Round
- Top goalscorer: League: Len Clarke (13); All: Len Clarke (15)

The 1934–35 season was Rochdale A.F.C.'s 28th in existence and their 14th in the Football League Third Division North.

== Squad Statistics ==
=== Appearances and goals ===
No.	Pos	Nat	Player	Total		Division 3 North		FA Cup		Division 3 North Cup	
No.	Pos	Nat	Player	Apps	Goals	Apps	Goals	Apps	Goals	Apps	Goals
	GK	(England) ENG	Cliff Walmsley	30	0	28	0	1	0	1	0
	DF	(England) ENG	Albert Worthy	32	0	31	0	0	0	1	0
	DF	(England) ENG	Arthur Ives	8	0	7	0	0	0	1	0
	DF	(England) ENG	George Wyness	34	0	33	0	0	0	1	0
	DF	(Scotland) SCO	George Jordan	20	0	17	0	1	0	2	0
	DF	(England) ENG	Walter Buckley	41	0	37	0	1	0	3	0
	MF	(England) ENG	Frank Ryder	7	0	6	0	0	0	1	0
	DF	(England) ENG	Bert Humpish	35	3	31	2	1	0	3	1
	FW	(England) ENG	Philip Bartley	14	3	14	3	0	0	0	0
	FW	(Scotland) SCO	William Douglas	1	0	1	0	0	0	0	0
	MF	(England) ENG	Harold Howe	25	3	24	3	0	0	1	0
	MF	(Scotland) SCO	Charlie Whyte	9	1	9	1	0	0	0	0
	DF	(England) ENG	Reg Cook	5	0	5	0	0	0	0	0
	FW	(Scotland) SCO	James Nicol	27	11	27	11	0	0	0	0
	DF	(England) ENG	Levi Redfern	27	3	25	3	1	0	1	0
	FW	(England) ENG	Billy Smith	4	2	3	1	1	1	0	0
	MF	(England) ENG	Billy Thomas	7	1	6	1	0	0	1	0
	FW	(England) ENG	Les Sullivan	35	9	32	9	0	0	3	0
	MF	(England) ENG	George Dobson	18	5	15	5	1	0	2	0
	DF	(Wales) WAL	Gwyn Jones	31	0	28	0	1	0	2	0
	FW	(England) ENG	Cliff Eaton	21	2	17	1	1	0	3	1
	FW	(England) ENG	Len Clarke	28	15	24	13	1	0	3	2
	GK	(England) ENG	Bert Welch	16	0	14	0	0	0	2	0
	MF	(England) ENG	Sam Skaife	31	0	28	0	1	0	2	0

Squad Statistics (Non-competitive)

=== Appearances and goals (Non-competitive) ===
No.	Pos	Nat	Player	Total		Lancashire Cup		Manchester Cup	
No.	Pos	Nat	Player	Apps	Goals	Apps	Goals	Apps	Goals
	GK	(England) ENG	Cliff Walmsley	2	0	1	0	1	0
	DF	(England) ENG	Albert Worthy	1	0	1	0	0	0
	DF	(England) ENG	Arthur Ives	1	0	0	0	1	0
	DF	(England) ENG	George Wyness	2	0	1	0	1	0
	DF	(Scotland) SCO	George Jordan	1	0	1	0	0	0
	DF	(England) ENG	Walter Buckley	1	1	1	1	0	0
	MF	(England) ENG	Frank Ryder	0	0	0	0	0	0
	DF	(England) ENG	Bert Humpish	2	0	1	0	1	0
	FW	(England) ENG	Philip Bartley	1	0	0	0	1	0
	FW	(Scotland) SCO	William Douglas	0	0	0	0	0	0
	MF	(England) ENG	Harold Howe	0	0	0	0	0	0
	MF	(Scotland) SCO	Charlie Whyte	1	0	1	0	0	0
	DF	(England) ENG	Reg Cook	1	0	1	0	0	0
	FW	(Scotland) SCO	James Nicol	2	0	1	0	1	0
	DF	(England) ENG	Levi Redfern	2	0	1	0	1	0
	FW	(England) ENG	Billy Smith	1	1	1	1	0	0
	MF	(England) ENG	Billy Thomas	1	0	0	0	1	0
	FW	(England) ENG	Les Sullivan	1	0	0	0	1	0
	MF	(England) ENG	George Dobson	1	0	0	0	1	0
	DF	(Wales) WAL	Gwyn Jones	0	0	0	0	0	0
	FW	(England) ENG	Cliff Eaton	0	0	0	0	0	0
	FW	(England) ENG	Len Clarke	0	0	0	0	0	0
	GK	(England) ENG	Bert Welch	0	0	0	0	0	0
	MF	(England) ENG	Sam Skaife	1	0	0	0	1	0

== Final league table ==
Pos	Team	Pld	W	D	L	GF	GA	GAv	Pts	Promotion
18	Accrington Stanley	42	12	10	20	63	89	0.708	34	
19	Gateshead	42	13	8	21	58	96	0.604	34	
20	Rochdale	42	11	11	20	53	71	0.746	33	
21	Southport	42	10	12	20	55	85	0.647	32	Re-elected
22	Carlisle United	42	8	7	27	51	102	0.500	23	Re-elected

Source: rsssf.com

== Competitions ==
=== Football League Third Division North ===
25 August 1934 1	Lincoln City	3–0	Rochdale	Lincoln
	Reed; Campbell; Iverson	Report		Stadium: Sincil Bank; Attendance: 6765

28 August 1934 2	Rochdale	0–1	Barrow	Rochdale
		Report	Peed	Stadium: Spotland Stadium; Attendance: 4396

1 September 1934 3	Rochdale	1–1	Tranmere Rovers	Rochdale
	Whyte	Report	Urmson (pen.)	Stadium: Spotland Stadium; Attendance: 6582

3 September 1934 4	Barrow	1–1	Rochdale	Barrow-in-Furness
	Foster	Report	Bartley	Stadium: Holker Street; Attendance: 5556

8 September 1934 5	Wrexham	2–0	Rochdale	Wrexham
	Waller; Bamford	Report		Stadium: Racecourse Ground; Attendance: 6588

15 September 1934 6	Rochdale	2–4	Halifax Town	Rochdale
	Nicol; Thomas	Report	Tunstall; Valentine	Stadium: Spotland Stadium; Attendance: 7830

22 September 1934 7	Rotherham United	4–0	Rochdale	Rotherham
	Bastow; Fenoughty; Dickinson	Report		Stadium: Millmoor; Attendance: 3807

29 September 1934 8	Rochdale	1–0	Walsall	Rochdale
	Sullivan; Humpish (red card)	Report		Stadium: Spotland Stadium; Attendance: 2511

6 October 1934 9	Chesterfield	2–0	Rochdale	Chesterfield
	Turner; Brown	Report		Stadium: Saltergate Recreation Ground; Attendance: 4413

13 October 1934 10	Rochdale	1–0	Mansfield Town	Rochdale
	Sullivan (pen.)	Report		Stadium: Spotland Stadium; Attendance: 3684

20 October 1934 11	Rochdale	2–2	Accrington Stanley	Rochdale
	Nicol; Redfern	Report	Harker; Brown	Stadium: Spotland Stadium; Attendance: 5263

27 October 1934 12	Gateshead	2–0	Rochdale	Gateshead
	Ferguson; Hales	Report		Stadium: Redheugh Park; Attendance: 3197

3 November 1934 13	Rochdale	0–5	Stockport County	Rochdale
		Report	Stevenson; McNaughton; Dunkerley	Stadium: Spotland Stadium; Attendance: 5045

10 November 1934 14	Crewe Alexandra	4–1	Rochdale	Crewe
	Mustard; Dyer	Report	Clarke	Stadium: Gresty Road; Attendance: 3620

17 November 1934 15	Rochdale	3–2	Hartlepools United	Rochdale
	Nicol; Dobson	Report	Lindsay; Bonass	Stadium: Spotland Stadium; Attendance: 3782

1 December 1934 16	Rochdale	2–2	Southport	Rochdale
	Clarke; Smith	Report	Appleby; Worswick	Stadium: Spotland Stadium; Attendance: 2869

15 December 1934 17	Rochdale	3–1	New Brighton	Rochdale
	Clarke; Jordan (red card)	Report	Allen	Stadium: Spotland Stadium; Attendance: 3095

22 December 1934 18	York City	0–1	Rochdale	York
		Report	Eaton	Stadium: Bootham Crescent; Attendance: 3003

25 December 1934 19	Rochdale	1–3	Darlington	Rochdale
	Sullivan	Report	Best	Stadium: Spotland Stadium; Attendance: 5466

26 December 1934 20	Darlington	2–2	Rochdale	Darlington
	Edgar; Middleton	Report	Sullivan; Clarke	Stadium: Feethams; Attendance: 6943

29 December 1934 21	Rochdale	2–0	Lincoln City	Rochdale
	Nicol	Report		Stadium: Spotland Stadium; Attendance: 4531

5 January 1935 22	Tranmere Rovers	4–1	Rochdale	Birkenhead
	Burgin; MacDonald	Report	Clarke	Stadium: Prenton Park; Attendance: 6816

12 January 1935 23	Doncaster Rovers	1–0	Rochdale	Doncaster
	Turner	Report		Stadium: Belle Vue; Attendance: 5895

19 January 1935 24	Rochdale	3–3	Wrexham	Rochdale
	Humpish; Howe; Sullivan (pen.)	Report	Waller; Fryer	Stadium: Spotland Stadium; Attendance: 4702

26 January 1935 25	Halifax Town	1–1	Rochdale	Halifax
	Tunstall (pen.)	Report	Clarke	Stadium: The Shay; Attendance: 7133

2 February 1935 26	Rochdale	1–3	Rotherham United	Rochdale
	Humpish	Report	Raynor; Bastow; Dickinson	Stadium: Spotland Stadium; Attendance: 4212

9 February 1935 27	Walsall	0–0	Rochdale	Walsall
		Report		Stadium: Fellows Park; Attendance: 6954

16 February 1935 28	Rochdale	0–2	Chesterfield	Rochdale
		Report	Lovett; Dawson	Stadium: Spotland Stadium; Attendance: 2033

23 February 1935 29	Mansfield Town	1–0	Rochdale	Mansfield
	Edmonds	Report		Stadium: Field Mill; Attendance: 4788

2 March 1935 30	Accrington Stanley	2–5	Rochdale	Accrington
	Britton (pen.)	Report	Nicol; Sullivan; Clarke	Stadium: Peel Park; Attendance: 2019

9 March 1935 31	Rochdale	6–1	Gateshead	Rochdale
	Howe; Nicol; Redfern; Sullivan; Clarke	Report	Rivers	Stadium: Spotland Stadium; Attendance: 3562

16 March 1935 32	Stockport County	3–1	Rochdale	Stockport
	Stranger; McNaughton; Hill	Report	Nicol	Stadium: Edgeley Park; Attendance: 7735

23 March 1935 33	Rochdale	3–0	Crewe Alexandra	Rochdale
	Sullivan; Clarke	Report		Stadium: Spotland Stadium; Attendance: 1889

30 March 1935 34	Hartlepools United	0–0	Rochdale	Hartlepool
		Report		Stadium: Victoria Park; Attendance: 2955

3 April 1935 35	Chester	1–0	Rochdale	Chester
	Wilson (pen.)	Report		Stadium: Sealand Road; Attendance: 3004

6 April 1935 36	Rochdale	0–1	Doncaster Rovers	Rochdale
		Report	Baines	Stadium: Spotland Stadium; Attendance: 7154

13 April 1935 37	Southport	2–1	Rochdale	Southport
	Worswick	Report	Clarke	Stadium: Haig Avenue; Attendance: 2315

19 April 1935 38	Carlisle United	0–0	Rochdale	Carlisle
		Report		Stadium: Brunton Park; Attendance: 4417

20 April 1935 39	Rochdale	3–3	Chester	Rochdale
	Bartley; Dobson	Report	Mantle	Stadium: Spotland Stadium; Attendance: 6933

22 April 1935 40	Rochdale	3–1	Carlisle United	Rochdale
	Nicol; Dobson	Report	Ferguson	Stadium: Spotland Stadium; Attendance: 5711

27 April 1935 41	New Brighton	1–0	Rochdale	New Brighton
	Worthy (o.g.)	Report		Stadium: Sandheys Park; Attendance: 1875

4 May 1935 42	Rochdale	2–0	York City	Rochdale
	Redfern; Dobson	Report		Stadium: Spotland Stadium; Attendance: 5212

=== FA Cup ===
24 November 1934 1	Wrexham	4–1	Rochdale	Wrexham
	Findlay; Fryer; Rogers	Report	Smith	Stadium: Racecourse Ground; Attendance: 5500

=== Third Division North Cup ===
8 December 1934 1	Carlisle United	1–1	Rochdale	Carlisle
	Elliott		Eaton	Stadium: Brunton Park; Attendance: 2000

8 January 1935 1 (Replay)	Rochdale	3–0	Carlisle United	Rochdale
	Humpish; Clarke			Stadium: Spotland Stadium; Attendance: 1500

25 March 1935 3 (Bye in R2)	Stockport County	3–0	Rochdale	Stockport
	Dunkerley; Hill			Stadium: Edgeley Park; Attendance: 1500

=== Lancashire Cup ===
11 September 1934 1	Rochdale	2–3	Oldham Athletic	Rochdale
	Buckley; Smith		Goal	Stadium: Spotland Stadium; Attendance: 4000

=== Manchester Cup ===
19 February 1935 1	Bury	3–0	Rochdale	Bury
	Goal			Stadium: Gigg Lane
