= List of Oldham Athletic A.F.C. players =

For a list of all Oldham Athletic players with a Wikipedia article, see Category:Oldham Athletic A.F.C. players.

Players should be listed in chronological order according to the year in which they first played for the club. Appearances and goals should be for first-team competitive games and include substitute appearances, but exclude wartime matches.

Name	Nationality	Position	Club career	League apps	League goals	Total apps	Total goals	Notes
Jimmy Fay	England	DF	1907–1911	154	37	164	37	
James Hamilton	England	DF	1907–1911	105	5	115	6	
David Walders	England	DF	1907–1912	112	8	122	8	
Jimmy Hodson	England	DF	1907–1915	252	1	277	1	
David Wilson	Scotland	MF	1907–1921	368	17	397	21	
Billy Cook	England	DF	1908–1920	157	16	171	0	
Joe Donnachie	Scotland	MF	1908–1915	216	20	238	22	
Howard Matthews	England	GK	1908–1926	344	0	367	0	
Tommy Broad	England	MF	1909–1912	96	9	104	9	
George Woodger	England	FW	1910–1914	115	22	130	26	
Hugh Moffat	England	MF	1910–1915	162	10	182	10	
Elliot Pilkington	England	DF	1911–1926	269	14	280	15	
Ollie Tummon	England	MF	1912–1915	108	20	121	24	
Joe Walters	England	FW	1912–1920	110	33	117	34	
Arthur Gee	England	FW	1912–1921	112	44	119	47	
Harry Grundy	England	DF	1914–1928	279	0	289	0	
Bill Taylor	England	MF	1920–1924	109	1	115	2	
Reg Freeman	England	DF	1921–1923	101	0	104	0	
Sam Wynne	England	DF	1921–1926	145	9	153	10	
Bert Watson	England	MF	1921–1929	233	63	242	71	
George Douglas	England	MF	1922–1926	134	8	141	9	
Jimmy Naylor	England	MF	1922–1928	246	5	257	6	
Bert Gray	Wales	GK	1923–1927	97	0	101	0	
Frank Hargreaves	England	FW	1923–1930	108	17	109	17	
Les Adlam	England	MF	1923–1931	279	9	290	10	
Teddy Ivill	England	DF	1924–1932	276	2	285	3	
Albert Pynegar	England	FW	1925–1928	131	50	138	54	
Ted Goodier	England	MF	1926–1931	113	2	115	3	
Jack Hacking	England	GK	1926–1934	223	0	234	0	
Fred Worrall	England	MF	1928–1931	105	21	107	21	
Jimmy Dyson	England	MF	1928–1932	122	41	129	45	
Bill Hasson	Scotland	MF	1928–1934	134	22	138	22	
Billy Porter	England	DF	1928–1935	274	1	284	1	
Matt Gray	England	FW	1928–1938	289	58	303	58	
Tommy Seymour	England	DF	1929–1936	127	0	137	0	
Alf Agar	England	MF	1932–1935	96	28	101	29	
Norman Brunskill	England	MF	1932–1936	143	10	151	11	
Bill Ratcliffe	England	DF	1935–1939	156	1	162	1	
Lewis Caunce	England	GK	1935–1939	134	0	147	0	
Billy Hilton	England	DF	1935–1939	129	4	141	5	
Arthur Jones	Wales	MF	1935–1939	98	29	110	31	
Tommy Williamson	England	MF	1935–1947	157	4	173	4	
Bill Hayes	England	MF	1939–1951	126	3	133	3	
Ken Brierley	England	MF	1945–1949, 1953–1955	125	10	134	11	
Frank Tomlinson	England	MF	1946–1950	115	28	124	30	
Tommy Bell	England	DF	1946–1952	170	0	181	0	
Ray Haddington	England	FW	1947–1950	117	63	126	73	
Jack Hurst	England	DF	1947–1950	98	2	107	2	
Eric Gemmell	England	FW	1947–1954	195	109	216	120	
Bill Spurdle	England	MF	1948–1950, 1957–1963	200	24	222	28	
Willie Jessop	England	MF	1948–1951	94	16	106	18	
Fred Ogden	England	GK	1948–1954	156	0	167	0	
Lewis Brook	England	DF	1948–1957	189	14	196	14	
Bill Naylor	England	DF	1948–1959	224	0	238	0	
Les Smith	England	MF	1949–1955	178	3	192	4	
Jimmy Munro	Scotland	MF	1950–1953	119	20	128	21	
Bobby McIlvenny	Northern Ireland	FW	1950–1954	139	35	147	37	
Bill Ormond	Scotland	MF	1950–1954	122	25	127	27	
Archie Whyte	Scotland	DF	1950–1956	234	0	248	0	
George Hardwick	England	DF	1950–1956	190	14	203	14	
Don Travis	England	FW	1951–1952, 1954–1957	114	62	118	62	
George Burnett	England	GK	1951–1954	100	0	105	0	
Tommy Walker	England	MF	1954–1958	158	23	164	23	
Jimmy Thompson	England	MF	1954–1958	110	19	116	21	
Wilf Hobson	England	MF	1954–1959	170	1	180	1	
John Bollands	England	GK	1955–1956, 1961–1966	154	0	171	0	
Peter Neale	England	DF	1955–1958	117	28	122	31	
Ted West	England	DF	1957–1960	117	0	125	0	
John Bazley	England	MF	1957–1962	130	19	138	20	
Peter Phoenix	England	MF	1958–1962	161	26	179	30	
Brian Jarvis	Wales	MF	1959–1963	88	3	104	4	
Bert Lister	England	FW	1960–1964	135	77	154	96	
Ken Branagan	England	DF	1960–1965	177	5	197	5	
Bobby Johnstone	Scotland	FW	1960–1965	143	35	160	38	
Jimmy Frizzell	Scotland	MF	1960–1969	317	56	352	60	
Alan Williams	England	DF	1961–1964	172	9	191	10	
John Colquhoun	Scotland	MF	1961–1965, 1968–1970	233	38	257	50	
Peter McCall	England	MF	1962–1965	108	5	116	5	
Bob Ledger	England	MF	1962–1967	222	37	240	38	
Jim Bowie	Scotland	MF	1962–1972	333	37	364	42	
Allan Lawson	Scotland	DF	1964–1970	138	1	149	1	
David Best	England	GK	1966–1968	98	0	107	0	
Ian Towers	England	FW	1966–1968	95	44	105	44	
Reg Blore	Wales	MF	1966–1970	187	19	202	22	
Keith Bebbington	England	MF	1966–1972	237	40	255	47	
Ian Wood	England	DF	1966–1980	524	22	586	27	
Ronnie Blair	Northern Ireland	DF	1967–1969, 1972–1981	372	23	421	26	
Les Chapman	England	MF	1967–1969, 1974–1979	263	20	298	23	
David Shaw	England	FW	1969–1973, 1975–1977	214	91	229	95	
Alan McNeill	Northern Ireland	MF	1969–1974	170	19	188	20	
Maurice Whittle	England	DF	1969–1977	312	39	350	43	
Ian Robins	England	FW	1969–1977	220	40	243	46	
Bill Cranston	Scotland	DF	1970–1971	100	2	106	2	
Harry Dowd	England	GK	1970–1974	121	0	131	0	
Colin Garwood	England	FW	1971–1974	93	36	109	40	
Dick Mulvaney	England	DF	1971–1974	92	2	106	2	
Chris Ogden	England	GK	1971–1977	128	0	153	0	
George McVitie	England	MF	1972–1975	113	19	127	22	
Keith Hicks	England	DF	1972–1980	242	11	286	13	
Paul Edwards	England	DF	1973–1978	112	7	133	8	
Alan Groves	England	MF	1974–1977	140	12	163	14	
Graham Bell	England	MF	1974–1979	170	9	200	9	
Alan Young	Scotland	FW	1974–1979	122	30	146	39	
David Holt	England	DF	1974–1980	142	1	162	1	
John Platt	England	GK	1975–1981	109	0	126	0	
Vic Halom	England	FW	1976–1980	123	43	154	51	
John Hurst	England	DF	1976–1981	170	2	209	2	
Gary Hoolickin	England	DF	1977–1987	211	2	247	3	
Peter McDonnell	England	GK	1978–1982	137	0	165	0	
Jim Steel	Scotland	FW	1978–1982	108	24	132	27	
Paul Heaton	England	MF	1978–1983	136	28	151	33	
Ged Keegan	England	MF	1979–1983	144	5	165	6	
Paul Atkinson	England	MF	1979–1983, 1985–1987	176	12	202	15	
Kenny Clements	England	DF	1979–1985	206	2	229	2	
Rodger Wylde	England	FW	1980–1983	113	51	132	54	
Paul Futcher	England	DF	1980–1983	98	1	113	1	
Darron McDonough	England	MF	1980–1986	183	14	200	17	
Roger Palmer	England	FW	1980–1994	466	141	536	157	
John Ryan	England	DF	1981–1983, 1985–1987	100	8	112	8	
Andy Goram	Scotland	GK	1982–1987, 2002	199	0	219	0	
Tony Henry	England	MF	1983–1987	190	25	211	27	
Willie Donachie	Scotland	DF	1984–1991	169	3	192	3	
Andy Barlow	England	DF	1984–1993	261	5	308	5	
Mike Milligan	England	MF	1985–1990, 1991–1994	279	23	336	27	
Andy Linighan	England	DF	1986–1988	87	6	102	8	
Tommy Wright	Scotland	MF	1986–1989, 1997–1998	124	25	139	29	
Denis Irwin	Ireland	DF	1986–1990	167	4	204	7	
Earl Barrett	England	DF	1987–1992	183	7	221	9	
Andy Ritchie	England	FW	1987–1995, 1997–2001	243	84	281	107	
Nick Henry	England	MF	1987–1997	273	19	333	22	
Ian Marshall	England	FW	1988–1993	170	36	204	40	
Rick Holden	England	MF	1989–1992, 1993–1995	189	28	234	36	
Neil Adams	England	MF	1989–1994, 1999–2001	185	27	221	31	
Jon Hallworth	England	GK	1989–1996	174	0	217	0	
Richard Jobson	England	DF	1990–1995	189	10	225	11	
Paul Bernard	Scotland	MF	1991–1995	112	18	137	21	
Graeme Sharp	Scotland	FW	1991–1995	109	30	135	36	
Gunnar Halle	Norway	DF	1991–1996	188	17	216	21	
Craig Fleming	England	DF	1991–1997	164	1	192	1	
Neil Pointon	England	DF	1992–1995	95	3	108	4	
Mark Brennan	England	MF	1992–1996	90	7	107	7	
Paul Gerrard	England	GK	1992–1996, 2011	120	0	137	0	
Steve Redmond	England	DF	1992–1998	205	4	239	5	
John Eyre	England	MF	1993–1995, 2001–2005	128	15	154	18	
Chris Makin	England	DF	1993–1996	94	4	114	4	
Sean McCarthy	Wales	FW	1993–1998	140	42	161	45	
Richard Graham	England	DF	1993–2000	150	14	177	15	
Lee Richardson	England	MF	1994–1997	88	21	101	24	
Paul Rickers	England	MF	1994–2002	261	20	301	22	
Stuart Barlow	England	FW	1995–1998	93	31	107	32	
Carl Serrant	England	DF	1995–1998	90	1	106	2	
Scott McNiven	England	DF	1995–2002	222	3	266	4	
Gary Kelly	England	GK	1996–2001	225	0	263	0	
Shaun Garnett	England	DF	1996–2001	173	9	196	9	
Mark Allott	England	FW	1996–2001, 2007–2009	241	38	284	40	
Paul Reid	England	MF	1997–1999	93	6	106	7	
Andy Holt	England	DF	1997–2001	124	10	135	10	
Matthew Tipton	Wales	FW	1997–2002	112	15	136	17	
Lee Duxbury	England	MF	1997–2003	248	32	284	39	
John Sheridan	Ireland	MF	1998–2004	145	14	165	16	Manager 2003–2009, 2016, 2017, 2022–
Carlo Corazzin	Canada	FW	2000–2003	110	20	129	23	
David Eyres	England	MF	2000–2006	207	33	242	44	
Darren Sheridan	England	MF	2001–2004	88	3	109	3	
Paul Murray	England	MF	2001–2004	95	15	105	15	
Dean Holden	England	DF	2001–2005	108	10	125	11	
Will Haining	Scotland	DF	2001–2007	155	11	180	12	
Les Pogliacomi	Australia	GK	2002–2007	160	0	187	0	
Lee Croft	England	MF	2004–2005, 2012–2013, 2015–2017	98	1	121	4	
Paul Warne	England	MF	2005–2007	86	18	100	21	
Richie Wellens	England	MF	2005–2007, 2015–2016	90	8	104	8	
Andy Liddell	Scotland	FW	2005–2009	125	29	144	33	
Stefan Stam	Netherlands	DF	2005–2009	97	1	112	1	
Neal Eardley	Wales	DF	2006–2009	113	10	129	10	
Sean Gregan	England	MF	2006–2010	129	1	143	2	
Chris Taylor	England	MF	2006–2012, 2017	270	33	302	35	
Reuben Hazell	England	DF	2007–2010	151	7	166	7	
Deane Smalley	England	FW	2007–2010	102	10	117	11	
Kieren Lee	England	MF	2008–2012	117	5	134	5	
Dean Furman	South Africa	MF	2009–2013	131	8	146	9	
Jean-Yves Mvoto	France	DF	2010–2013	105	7	123	8	
Carl Winchester	Northern Ireland	MF	2010–2017	120	8	140	8	
James Wesolowski	Australia	MF	2011–2014	93	7	115	9	
Jonathan Grounds	England	DF	2012–2014	89	4	106	4	
Danny Philliskirk	England	FW	2013–2016	104	13	124	25	
James Wilson	Wales	DF	2014–2016	100	2	109	2	
Brian Wilson	England	DF	2014–2018	104	1	127	2	
Peter Clarke	England	DF	2016–2019 2022–2023	122	12	140	18	
Danny Gardner	England	FW	2017–2018 2022–2025	128	9	144	9	
Tom Hamer	England	DF	2018–2021	84	6	105	6	
Christopher Missilou	DR Congo	MF	2018–2020, 2022	92	6	104	6	
Carl Piergianni	England	DF	2019–2022	89	8	104	9	
Davis Keillor-Dunn	England	MF	2020–2022	87	25	105	28	
Will Sutton	England	DF	2020–	94	5	108	9	As of end of 2025–26 season
Mike Fondop-Talom	England	FW	2022–	154	48	168	52	As of end of 2025–26 season
Mark Kitching	England	DF	2022–2025	113	6	121	6	
Mathew Hudson	England	GK	2023–	130	0	149	0	As of end of 2025–26 season
