= 1936–37 Rochdale A.F.C. season =

English football club season

Rochdale
1936–37 season
- Manager: Ernest Nixon
- Stadium: Spotland Stadium
- Football League Third Division North: 18th
- FA Cup: 1st Round
- Top goalscorer: League: Wally Hunt (24); All: Wally Hunt (24)

The 1936–37 season was Rochdale A.F.C.'s 30th in existence and their 16th in the Football League Third Division North.

== Squad Statistics ==
=== Appearances and goals ===
No.	Pos	Nat	Player	Total		Division 3 North		FA Cup		Division 3 North Cup	
No.	Pos	Nat	Player	Apps	Goals	Apps	Goals	Apps	Goals	Apps	Goals
	GK	(England) ENG	Des Fawcett	40	0	38	0	1	0	1	0
	DF	(England) ENG	Albert Worthy	28	0	27	0	1	0	0	0
	DF	(Wales) WAL	Gwyn Jones	22	0	22	0	0	0	0	0
	DF	(England) ENG	Charlie Robinson	9	0	9	0	0	0	0	0
	DF	(England) ENG	Andrew Carr	34	0	32	0	1	0	1	0
	MF	(England) ENG	Sam Skaife	17	0	16	0	0	0	1	0
	FW	(England) ENG	George Emmerson	33	9	31	9	1	0	1	0
	FW	(England) ENG	Joe Duff	43	1	42	1	1	0	0	0
	FW	(England) ENG	Wally Hunt	42	24	40	24	1	0	1	0
	FW	(England) ENG	Harry Marshall	35	8	34	7	1	1	0	0
	MF	(Wales) WAL	Sid Protheroe	34	7	33	7	1	0	0	0
	MF	(England) ENG	Edward Huntley	7	0	6	0	0	0	1	0
	DF	(England) ENG	Roy Clipson	33	0	31	0	1	0	1	0
	MF	(England) ENG	Matt Johnson	5	0	4	0	0	0	1	0
	MF	(England) ENG	Harry Brierley	10	2	10	2	0	0	0	0
	DF	(England) ENG	Stanley Cook	2	0	1	0	0	0	1	0
	MF	(England) ENG	Ted Marcroft	6	0	5	0	0	0	1	0
	DF	(England) ENG	William Smith	5	1	4	1	0	0	1	0
	FW	(England) ENG	Jimmy Wynn	22	16	22	16	0	0	0	0
	DF	(Scotland) SCO	Hugh McLaren	31	0	30	0	1	0	0	0
	GK	(England) ENG	Christopher Cornthwaite	4	0	4	0	0	0	0	0
	FW	(England) ENG	Harry Rowbotham	20	1	19	1	1	0	0	0
	FW	(England) ENG	Cyril Crawshaw	2	0	2	0	0	0	0	0

Squad Statistics (Non-competitive)

=== Appearances and goals (Non-competitive) ===
No.	Pos	Nat	Player	Total		Lancashire Cup	
No.	Pos	Nat	Player	Apps	Goals	Apps	Goals
	GK	(England) ENG	Des Fawcett	2	0	2	0
	DF	(England) ENG	Albert Worthy	0	0	0	0
	DF	(Wales) WAL	Gwyn Jones	1	0	1	0
	DF	(England) ENG	Charlie Robinson	0	0	0	0
	DF	(England) ENG	Andrew Carr	2	0	2	0
	MF	(England) ENG	Sam Skaife	2	0	2	0
	FW	(England) ENG	George Emmerson	1	0	1	0
	FW	(England) ENG	Joe Duff	2	1	2	1
	FW	(England) ENG	Wally Hunt	2	2	2	2
	FW	(England) ENG	Harry Marshall	1	0	1	0
	MF	(Wales) WAL	Sid Protheroe	2	0	2	0
	MF	(England) ENG	Edward Huntley	2	0	2	0
	DF	(England) ENG	Roy Clipson	1	0	1	0
	MF	(England) ENG	Matt Johnson	0	0	0	0
	MF	(England) ENG	Harry Brierley	1	0	1	0
	DF	(England) ENG	Stanley Cook	2	0	2	0
	MF	(England) ENG	Ted Marcroft	1	1	1	1
	DF	(England) ENG	William Smith	0	0	0	0
	FW	(England) ENG	Jimmy Wynn	0	0	0	0
	DF	(Scotland) SCO	Hugh McLaren	0	0	0	0
	GK	(England) ENG	Christopher Cornthwaite	0	0	0	0
	FW	(England) ENG	Harry Rowbotham	0	0	0	0
	FW	(England) ENG	Cyril Crawshaw	0	0	0	0

== Final league table ==
Pos	Team	Pld	W	D	L	GF	GA	GAv	Pts
16	Barrow	42	13	10	19	70	86	0.814	36
17	Rotherham United	42	14	7	21	78	91	0.857	35
18	Rochdale	42	13	9	20	69	86	0.802	35
19	Tranmere Rovers	42	12	9	21	71	88	0.807	33
20	Crewe Alexandra	42	10	12	20	55	83	0.663	32

Source: rsssf.com
Rules for classification: 1) Points; 2) Goal average; 3) Goals scored

== Competitions ==
=== Football League Third Division North ===
29 August 1936 1	Crewe Alexandra	2–2	Rochdale	Crewe
	Goal	Report	Hunt	Stadium: Gresty Road; Attendance: 4754

31 August 1936 2	Rochdale	1–3	Mansfield Town	Rochdale
	Hunt	Report	Harston	Stadium: Spotland Stadium; Attendance: 5297

5 September 1936 3	Rochdale	0–1	Chester	Rochdale
		Report	Horsman	Stadium: Spotland Stadium; Attendance: 5806

9 September 1936 4	Mansfield Town	6–2	Rochdale	Mansfield
	Atkinson; Harston	Report	Duff; Marshall	Stadium: Field Mill; Attendance: 7404

12 September 1936 5	Stockport County	3–0	Rochdale	Stockport
	Leach (pen.); Smailes	Report		Stadium: Edgeley Park; Attendance: 6722

15 September 1936 6	Rochdale	2–1	Southport	Rochdale
	Hunt; Emmerson	Report	Kitchen	Stadium: Spotland Stadium; Attendance: 3256

19 September 1936 7	Barrow	3–0	Rochdale	Barrow-in-Furness
	Barley; Baker	Report		Stadium: Holker Street; Attendance: 3435

26 September 1936 8	Rochdale	3–0	York City	Rochdale
	Protheroe; Hunt (pen.)	Report		Stadium: Spotland Stadium; Attendance: 4598

3 October 1936 9	Carlisle United	1–0	Rochdale	Carlisle
	Mantle	Report		Stadium: Brunton Park; Attendance: 6916

10 October 1936 10	Rochdale	1–1	Hartlepools United	Rochdale
	Marshall	Report	Scrimshaw	Stadium: Spotland Stadium; Attendance: 5171

17 October 1936 11	Rochdale	0–6	Wrexham	Rochdale
		Report	White; Lapham; Burgon; Brown	Stadium: Spotland Stadium; Attendance: 2380

24 October 1936 12	Darlington	4–1	Rochdale	Darlington
	Brallisford; Stanger; Lowery	Report	Hunt	Stadium: Feethams; Attendance: 4796

31 October 1936 13	Rochdale	0–2	Gateshead	Rochdale
		Report	McDermott; Reay	Stadium: Spotland Stadium; Attendance: 3991

7 November 1936 14	Hull City	1–1	Rochdale	Hull
	Holmes	Report	Marshall	Stadium: Anlaby Road; Attendance: 6963

14 November 1936 15	Rochdale	4–0	New Brighton	Rochdale
	Protheroe; Hunt	Report		Stadium: Spotland Stadium; Attendance: 3356

21 November 1936 16	Lincoln City	5–3	Rochdale	Lincoln
	Campbell	Report	Hunt; Marshall	Stadium: Sincil Bank; Attendance: 4595

5 December 1936 17	Oldham Athletic	3–0	Rochdale	Oldham
	Davis	Report		Stadium: Boundary Park; Attendance: 4872

12 December 1936 18	Rochdale	0–0	Port Vale	Rochdale
		Report		Stadium: Spotland Stadium; Attendance: 2218

19 December 1936 19	Rotherham United	1–1	Rochdale	Rotherham
	Smith	Report	Protheroe	Stadium: Millmoor; Attendance: 4043

25 December 1936 20	Rochdale	2–1	Tranmere Rovers	Rochdale
	Hunt (pen.); Wynn	Report	Dellow	Stadium: Spotland Stadium; Attendance: 6558

26 December 1936 21	Rochdale	2–0	Crewe Alexandra	Rochdale
	Rowbotham; Protheroe	Report		Stadium: Spotland Stadium; Attendance: 5099

1 January 1937 22	Southport	1–1	Rochdale	Southport
	McKay	Report	Emmerson	Stadium: Haig Avenue; Attendance: 6579

2 January 1937 23	Chester	2–2	Rochdale	Chester
	Wrightson; Davies	Report	Emmerson; Hunt	Stadium: Sealand Road; Attendance: 4514

9 January 1937 24	Rochdale	2–2	Stockport County	Rochdale
	Emmerson; Brierley	Report	Hill; Billy Sullivan	Stadium: Spotland Stadium; Attendance: 10034

16 January 1937 25	Tranmere Rovers	4–3	Rochdale	Birkenhead
	Wood; Dellow	Report	Wynn; Hunt	Stadium: Prenton Park; Attendance: 5748

23 January 1937 26	Rochdale	3–1	Barrow	Rochdale
	Wynn; Hunt; Brierley	Report	Ouchterlonie	Stadium: Spotland Stadium; Attendance: 2606

6 February 1937 27	Rochdale	3–0	Carlisle United	Rochdale
	Wynn; Hunt; Emmerson	Report		Stadium: Spotland Stadium; Attendance: 4428

10 February 1937 28	York City	4–1	Rochdale	York
	Thompson; Comrie; Agar	Report	Wynn; Hunt (red card)	Stadium: Bootham Crescent; Attendance: 2292

13 February 1937 29	Hartlepools United	4–1	Rochdale	Hartlepool
	Self; Scott; Proctor (pen.); English	Report	Wynn	Stadium: Victoria Park; Attendance: 4180

20 February 1937 30	Wrexham	0–1	Rochdale	Wrexham
		Report	Wynn	Stadium: Racecourse Ground; Attendance: 2844

27 February 1937 31	Rochdale	4–0	Darlington	Rochdale
	Wynn; Hunt; Emmerson; Protheroe	Report		Stadium: Spotland Stadium; Attendance: 3179

6 March 1937 32	Gateshead	3–1	Rochdale	Gateshead
	McDermott; Carr (o.g.); Neilson	Report	Wynn	Stadium: Redheugh Park; Attendance: 1726

13 March 1937 33	Rochdale	4–0	Hull City	Rochdale
	Wynn; Hunt; Emmerson; Marshall	Report		Stadium: Spotland Stadium; Attendance: 3952

20 March 1937 34	New Brighton	5–1	Rochdale	New Brighton
	Ainsworth; Hullett; Mustard	Report	Bulloch (o.g.)	Stadium: Sandheys Park; Attendance: 2929

26 March 1937 35	Rochdale	3–5	Halifax Town	Rochdale
	Wynn; Hunt; Marshall	Report	Hoyland; Widdowfield; Barkas	Stadium: Spotland Stadium; Attendance: 5000

27 March 1937 36	Rochdale	2–3	Lincoln City	Rochdale
	Wynn; Marshall	Report	Whyte; Campbell; Callender	Stadium: Spotland Stadium; Attendance: 6630

29 March 1937 37	Halifax Town	3–2	Rochdale	Halifax
	Hoyland; Barkas	Report	Wynn; Smith	Stadium: The Shay; Attendance: 5898

3 April 1937 38	Accrington Stanley	3–1	Rochdale	Accrington
	Mee; Mortimer	Report	Wynn	Stadium: Peel Park; Attendance: 4096

10 April 1937 39	Rochdale	3–0	Oldham Athletic	Rochdale
	Emmerson; Protheroe	Report		Stadium: Spotland Stadium; Attendance: 7422

17 April 1937 40	Port Vale	1–1	Rochdale	Stoke-on-Trent
	Nolan	Report	Hunt	Stadium: Old Recreation Ground; Attendance: 2148

24 April 1937 41	Rochdale	1–0	Rotherham United	Rochdale
	Hunt 60'	Report		Stadium: Spotland Stadium; Attendance: 4243

27 April 1937 42	Rochdale	4–1	Accrington Stanley	Rochdale
	Hunt; Wynn; Protheroe	Report	Reynolds	Stadium: Spotland Stadium; Attendance: 2820

=== F.A. Cup ===
28 November 1936 1	Crewe Alexandra	5–1	Rochdale	Crewe
	Swindells; Dyer; Nicol	Report	Hunt	Stadium: Gresty Road; Attendance: 5000

=== Division 3 North Cup ===
13 October 1936 1	Southport	3–0	Rochdale	Southport
	Patrick; McCarthy			Stadium: Haig Avenue; Attendance: 1620

=== Lancashire Cup ===
23 September 1936 1	Accrington Stanley	2–3	Rochdale	Accrington
	Goal		Duff; Marcroft; Hunt	Stadium: Peel Park

10 October 1936 2	Rochdale	1–3	Blackburn Rovers	Rochdale
	Hunt		Goal	Stadium: Spotland Stadium; Attendance: 1000
