= John Towers =

John Towers may refer to:

- John Towers (bishop) (died 1649), English churchman, Bishop of Peterborough
- John Towers (minister) (c. 1747–1804), English Independent minister
- John T. Towers (1809–1855), mayor of Washington, D.C from 1854 to 1856
- John Henry Towers (1885–1955), United States Navy admiral and pioneer naval aviator
- John Towers (footballer) (1913–1979), English footballer, played for Darlington
- John Towers (businessman) (born 1948), English businessman, founder of Phoenix Venture Holdings

== Similar spelling ==
- John Tower (1925–1991), U.S. senator from Texas
