= Herbert Hales =

Herbert Hales may refer to:

- Bert Hales, English footballer
- Herbert 'Willie' Hales, English table tennis player
