= Tom Johnson (footballer, born 1911) =

English footballer

Personal information
- Full name: Tom Johnson
- Date of birth: 4 May 1911
- Place of birth: Ecclesfield, Sheffield, England
- Date of death: 19 August 1983 (aged 72)
- Place of death: Sheffield, England
- Height: 5 ft 11 in (1.80 m)
- Position: Defender

Youth career
- Ecclesfield WMC

Senior career*
| Years | Team | Apps | (Gls) |
- Ecclesfield United
| 1928–1946 | Sheffield United | 183 | (0) |
| 1940 | → Stockport County (guest) | | |
| 1941 | → Sheffield Wednesday (guest) | | |
| 1941 | → Chesterfield (guest) | | |
| 1946–1948 | Lincoln City | 75 | (0) |
Medal record
Sheffield United
| Runner-up | FA Cup | 1936 |
| Runner-up | Division Two | 1938–39 |
Lincoln City
| Winner | Division Three North | 1947–48 |
- * Club domestic league appearances and goals

Tom Johnson (4 May 1911 – 19 August 1983) was an English footballer who played as a defender. He made over 250 appearances for Sheffield United, the club which his father and brother also played for.

== Career ==
Despite his family connections, Johnson had been playing for his local side Ecclesfield United as an amateur when he was signed by Sheffield United in September 1928, but remained on part-time terms. Despite making his league debut in March 1930 in a home game against Bolton Wanderers, Johnson was seen as a slow developer and had to wait until the 1934–35 season before he could begin to establish himself in the first-team, only becoming a full-time professional in 1935.

Having finally established himself, Johnson grew in confidence and missed very few games in the following seasons, appearing in the 1936 FA Cup Final, and being awarded the club captaincy in 1938 and leading United to promotion a year later. With the outbreak of World War II Johnson remained with United until 1941 while working in a reserved occupation, playing regularly in the wartime leagues as well as making guest occasional appearances for Stockport County, Sheffield Wednesday and Chesterfield.

After returning with an ankle injury from active duty 1943, Johnson played no football until 1946, by which time he was in dispute with United over his contract. Handed a free transfer, Johnson joined Lincoln City in March 1946, captaining their 1947–48 season promotion side, and making 75 league appearances before retiring in 1949 and becoming Lincoln's Yorkshire scout.

== Personal life ==
Johnson was born in the Ecclesfield area of Sheffield, and educated at Barnsley Grammar School. He was the son of Harry Johnson Snr. and younger brother of Harry Johnson Jr. who both also played for Sheffield United. At the outset of World War II, Johnson became an electrician at Whitwell Colliery, but then joined the RAF in 1940. Johnson served in East Africa but was invalided out of the service with an ankle injury in 1943. Following his retirement from playing, Johnson opened an electrical business in Sheffield.

== Honours ==
Sheffield United

- Football League Second Division runner-up: 1938–39
- FA Cup runner-up: 1935–36

Lincoln City

- Football League Third Division North: 1947–48
