= Tom Baker (footballer, born 1905) =

English footballer (1905–1975)

Personal information
- Full name: Thomas William Baker
- Date of birth: 17 August 1905
- Place of birth: Seaham Harbour, England
- Date of death: 30 March 1975 (aged 69)
- Place of death: Shotton Colliery, England
- Height: 5 ft 10 in (1.78 m)
- Position: Goalkeeper

Senior career*
Years	Team	Apps	(Gls)
- Usworth Colliery
- Crook Town
- Shotton Colliery Welfare
- Chilton Colliery Recreation
1929–1932	Southport	59	(0)
1932–1934	Brentford	64	(0)
1934–1935	Northampton Town	13	(0)
1935–1936	Rochdale	38	(0)
- Horden Colliery Welfare
- * Club domestic league appearances and goals

Thomas William Baker (17 August 1905 – 30 March 1975), sometimes known as Billy Baker, was an English professional footballer who played as a goalkeeper in the Football League for Brentford, Southport, Northampton Town and Rochdale.

== Career ==
A goalkeeper, Baker began his career in his native North East with Northern League clubs Usworth Colliery, Crook Town, Shotton Colliery Welfare and Chilton Colliery Recreation. He later earned a move to the Football League with Southport, for whom he made 65 appearances before departing in 1932.

Baker signed for Third Division South club Brentford in 1932 on a free transfer. Originally signed by manager Harry Curtis as cover for Dave Smith, Baker quickly became Curtis' first-choice goalkeeper and held the position until January 1934, when Jack Clough took over. He made 43 appearances during the Bees' 1932–33 Third Division South title-winning season. Baker left Brentford at the end of the 1933–34 season and made 65 appearances in his two years at Griffin Park.

Baker remained in the Third Division South to sign for Northampton Town and made 13 league appearances during the 1934–35 season. His final league club was Third Division North club Rochdale and he ended his career with North Eastern League club Horden Colliery Welfare.

== Personal life ==
During his amateur football career, Baker worked as a miner.

== Career statistics ==
Appearances and goals by club, season and competition
Club	Season	League			FA Cup		Other		Total	
Club	Season	Division	Apps	Goals	Apps	Goals	Apps	Goals	Apps	Goals
Southport	1929–30	Third Division North	10	0	0	0	—		10	0
Southport	1930–31	Third Division North	32	0	6	0	—		38	0
Southport	1931–32	Third Division North	17	0	0	0	—		17	0
Southport	Total		59	0	6	0	—		65	0
Brentford	1932–33	Third Division South	42	0	1	0	—		43	0
Brentford	1933–34	Second Division	22	0	0	0	—		22	0
Brentford	Total		64	0	1	0	—		65	0
Rochdale	1935–36	Third Division North	38	0	1	0	1 (Note: Appearance in Third Division North Cup)	0	40	0
Career Total			161	0	8	0	1		170	0

== Honours ==
Brentford

- Football League Third Division South: 1932–33
