= Bollands =

Bollands may refer to:

- The Bollands, a folk music band

== People with the surname ==
- John Bollands (born 1935), English footballer

== See also ==
- Bolland, a surname
