= Christopher Ogden =

Christopher or Chris Ogden may refer to:

- Chris Ogden (footballer) (born 1953), see List of Oldham Athletic A.F.C. players
- Chris Ogden (born 1980), American college basketball coach
