= 1933–34 Brentford F.C. season =

English football team season

Brentford
1933–34 season
- Chairman: Louis P. Simon
- Manager: Harry Curtis
- Stadium: Griffin Park
- Second Division: 4th
- FA Cup: Third round
- Top goalscorer: League: Holliday (27); All: Holliday (27)
- Highest home attendance: 26,934
- Lowest home attendance: 12,017
- Average home league attendance: 16,377
Home colours

During the 1933–34 English football season, Brentford competed in the Football League Second Division for the first time in the club's history. A strong run in the middle of the season saw the Bees hold the second promotion place throughout March 1934, before a drop in form led the club to a 4th-place finish.

== Season summary ==
In preparation for Brentford's first-ever Second Division season and after a loss of £932 on the previous season (equivalent to £57,700 in 2025), manager Harry Curtis brought in a number of younger players to replace ageing full backs Tom Adamson, Alexander Stevenson and half back captain Jimmy Bain. Curtis stuck with the same free-scoring strikeforce of the previous season, electing to add only outside left Charlie Fletcher from Clapton Orient. Despite winning just 6 of the opening 16 matches of the season, Brentford found themselves in 8th place, before a run of 8 wins in 11 matches put the club into the second promotion place on 3 February 1934. Manager Curtis had made an astute purchase in the transfer market in January, recruiting Southend United's full back Arthur Bateman as a replacement for Tom Adamson.

2nd place was held until a defeat to Bradford City on 24 March dropped Brentford back to 3rd and results in the following four matches dropped the club to 4th. A 2–0 win over Swansea Town on 14 April saw the Bees rise back to the one remaining promotion place, with just three matches to play. Defeat to Millwall in the first of those matches dropped Brentford back to 4th, but a resounding 5–0 victory over Lincoln City in the penultimate match of the season left the Bees knowing that a draw and favourable results for 2nd-place Preston North End and 3rd-place Bolton Wanderers on the final day would be enough to secure promotion to the First Division. Despite Brentford's 2–1 victory over Bury at Gigg Lane on the final day, victory for Preston North End saw the Lilywhites pip Bolton Wanderers into the second promotion place. Brentford finished 4th in the club's first season in the second tier of English football.

Just one of Brentford's 85 goals during the season came from a player who was not a forward, centre half Joe James and the tally of 8 goalscorers for the season was at that time the lowest in club history. Jack Holliday top-scored with an impressive 27 goals and Idris Hopkins flourished at the higher level, scoring 21 times. Ernest Muttitt, Billy Scott and Charlie Fletcher ably supported Holliday and Hopkins by also scoring in double-figures.

== League table ==
Pos	Team	Pld	W	D	L	GF	GA	GAv	Pts	Promotion or relegation
2	Preston North End (P)	42	23	6	13	71	52	1.365	52	Promotion to the First Division
3	Bolton Wanderers	42	21	9	12	79	55	1.436	51	
4	Brentford	42	22	7	13	85	60	1.417	51	
5	Bradford (Park Avenue)	42	23	3	16	86	67	1.284	49	
6	Bradford City	42	20	6	16	73	67	1.090	46	

Rules for classification: 1) Points; 2) Goal average; 3) Goals scored
(P) Promoted

== Results ==
Brentford's goal tally listed first.

=== Legend ===
Win	Draw	Loss

=== Football League Second Division ===
No.	Date	Opponent	Venue	Result	Attendance	Scorer(s)
1	26 August 1933	Nottingham Forest	A	1–1	12,702	Hopkins
2	31 August 1933	Bradford Park Avenue	H	2–0	13,667	Holliday (2)
3	2 September 1933	West Ham United	H	4–1	19,918	Holliday (2), Hopkins (2)
4	6 September 1933	Bradford Park Avenue	A	2–5	11,982	Hopkins, Muttitt
5	9 September 1933	Plymouth Argyle	A	1–1	20,945	Watson
6	16 September 1933	Manchester United	H	3–4	17,180	Fletcher, Holliday, Muttitt
7	23 September 1933	Bolton Wanderers	A	2–3	9,894	Fletcher, Hopkins
8	30 September 1933	Hull City	H	2–2	14,570	Fletcher, Holliday
9	7 October 1933	Burnley	H	5–2	14,797	Hopkins (2), Holliday (2), Muttitt
10	14 October 1933	Oldham Athletic	A	4–1	9,831	James, Hopkins (2), Holliday
11	21 October 1933	Fulham	A	1–1	35,421	Holliday (pen)
12	28 October 1933	Southampton	H	2–0	15,611	Hopkins (2)
13	4 November 1933	Blackpool	A	1–3	14,229	Muttitt
14	11 November 1933	Bradford City	H	2–1	12,932	Muttitt, Holliday
15	18 November 1933	Port Vale	A	0–1	11,349	
16	25 November 1933	Notts County	H	2–2	12,110	Holliday, Scott
17	2 December 1933	Swansea Town	A	3–2	4,269	Fletcher (2), Muttitt
18	9 December 1933	Millwall	H	3–0	12,017	Scott (2), Holliday
19	16 December 1933	Lincoln City	A	2–0	6,080	Holliday (2, 1 pen)
20	23 December 1933	Bury	H	2–3	12,761	Muttitt, Fletcher
21	25 December 1933	Preston North End	H	3–2	20,662	Fletcher, Hopkins (2)
22	26 December 1933	Preston North End	A	2–3	24,451	Scott (2)
23	30 December 1933	Nottingham Forest	H	2–1	12,795	Hopkins, Scott
24	6 January 1934	West Ham United	A	2–3	24,108	Muttitt, Holliday
25	20 January 1934	Plymouth Argyle	H	3–0	17,566	Scott, Fletcher, Holliday
26	27 January 1934	Manchester United	A	3–1	16,891	Muttitt (2), Fletcher
27	3 February 1934	Bolton Wanderers	H	3–1	16,037	Holliday (2), Scott
28	10 February 1934	Hull City	A	1–0	10,566	Hopkins
29	17 February 1934	Burnley	A	1–3	11,666	Holliday
30	24 February 1934	Oldham Athletic	H	2–1	15,927	Scott, Muttitt
31	3 March 1934	Fulham	H	1–2	25,184	Holliday (pen)
32	10 March 1934	Southampton	A	0–0	10,349	
33	17 March 1934	Blackpool	H	1–0	16,461	Hopkins
34	24 March 1934	Bradford City	A	1–2	12,394	Hopkins
35	30 March 1934	Grimsby Town	A	2–2	23,233	Hopkins, Holliday
36	31 March 1934	Port Vale	H	2–0	19,758	Holliday, Scott
37	2 April 1934	Grimsby Town	H	1–2	26,934	Holliday
38	7 April 1934	Notts County	A	2–1	11,657	Allen, Hopkins
39	14 April 1934	Swansea Town	H	2–0	14,848	Hopkins, Muttitt
40	21 April 1934	Millwall	A	0–2	21,671	
41	28 April 1934	Lincoln City	H	5–0	12,184	Scott, Holliday (3), Hopkins
42	5 May 1934	Bury	A	2–1	9,461	Fletcher, Scott

=== FA Cup ===
Round	Date	Opponent	Venue	Result	Attendance
3R	13 January 1934	Hull City	A	0–1	18,000

- Sources: Statto, 11v11, 100 Years of Brentford

== Playing squad ==
Players' ages are as of the opening day of the 1933–34 season.

Pos.	Name	Nat.	Date of birth (age)	Signed from	Signed in	Notes
Goalkeepers
GK	Tom Baker	(England)	17 August 1905 (aged 28)	Southport	1932	
GK	Jack Clough	(England)	4 November 1898 (aged 34)	Mansfield Town	1933	
Defenders
DF	Tom Adamson	(Scotland)	12 February 1901 (aged 32)	Bury	1929	
DF	Jack Astley	(England)	3 December 1909 (aged 23)	Southport	1933	
DF	Arthur Bateman	(England)	1 April 1909 (aged 24)	Southend United	1934	
DF	William Hodge	(Scotland)	31 August 1904 (aged 28)	Rangers	1927	
DF	Alexander Stevenson	(Scotland)	24 October 1903 (aged 29)	Armadale	1927	
Midfielders
HB	Jimmy Bain	(Scotland)	6 February 1899 (aged 34)	Manchester Central	1928	
HB	Jackie Burns	(England)	27 November 1906 (aged 26)	Queens Park Rangers	1931	Amateur
HB	Joe James	(England)	13 January 1910 (aged 23)	Battersea Church	1929	
HB	Joe McClure	(England)	3 November 1907 (aged 25)	Everton	1933	
HB	Duncan McKenzie	(Scotland)	10 August 1912 (aged 21)	Albion Rovers	1932	
HB	Cecil Smith	(England)	16 June 1907 (aged 26)	Brentford Market	1931	
HB	Herbert Watson (c)	(England)	20 November 1908 (aged 24)	Middlesbrough	1932	
Forwards
FW	Ralph Allen	(England)	30 June 1906 (aged 27)	Fulham	1930	
FW	Charlie Fletcher	(England)	28 October 1905 (aged 27)	Clapton Orient	1933	
FW	Jack Holliday	(England)	19 December 1908 (aged 24)	Middlesbrough	1932	
FW	Idris Hopkins	(Wales)	11 October 1910 (aged 22)	Crystal Palace	1932	
FW	Ernest Muttitt	(England)	24 July 1908 (aged 25)	Middlesbrough	1932	
FW	George Robson	(England)	17 June 1908 (aged 25)	West Ham United	1931	
FW	Billy Scott	(England)	6 December 1907 (aged 25)	Middlesbrough	1932	
Players who left the club mid-season
HB	William Smith	(England)	22 October 1903 (aged 29)	Sheffield Wednesday	1933	Transferred to Crystal Palace

- Sources: 100 Years of Brentford, Timeless Bees, Football League Players' Records 1888 to 1939

== Coaching staff ==
Name	Role
(England) Harry Curtis	Manager
(England) Bob Kane	Trainer
(England) Jack Cartmell	Assistant Trainer
(England) Fred Keatch	Secretary

== Statistics ==
=== Appearances and goals ===

Brentford's highest appearance-makers in each position during the Football League season.

Pos	Nat	Name	League		FA Cup		Total	
Pos	Nat	Name	Apps	Goals	Apps	Goals	Apps	Goals
GK	(England)	Tom Baker	22	0	0	0	22	0
GK	(England)	Jack Clough	20	0	1	0	21	0
DF	(Scotland)	Tom Adamson	8	0	0	0	8	0
DF	(England)	Jack Astley	40	0	1	0	41	0
DF	(England)	Arthur Bateman	18	0	—		18	0
DF	(Scotland)	William Hodge	15	0	1	0	16	0
DF	(Scotland)	Alexander Stevenson	3	0	0	0	3	0
HB	(Scotland)	Jimmy Bain	8	0	0	0	8	0
HB	(England)	Jackie Burns	35	0	1	0	36	0
HB	(England)	Joe James	34	1	1	0	35	1
HB	(England)	Joe McClure	1	0	0	0	1	0
HB	(Scotland)	Duncan McKenzie	11	0	1	0	12	0
HB	(England)	Cecil Smith	1	0	0	0	1	0
HB	(England)	William Smith	1	0	0	0	1	0
HB	(England)	Herbert Watson	35	0	1	0	36	0
FW	(England)	Ralph Allen	1	1	0	0	1	1
FW	(England)	Charlie Fletcher	42	10	1	0	43	10
FW	(England)	Jack Holliday	41	27	1	0	42	27
FW	(Wales)	Idris Hopkins	42	21	1	0	43	21
FW	(England)	Ernest Muttitt	39	12	1	0	40	12
FW	(England)	George Robson	4	0	0	0	4	0
FW	(England)	Billy Scott	41	12	1	0	42	12

- Players listed in italics left the club mid-season.
- Source: 100 Years of Brentford

=== Goalscorers ===
Pos.	Nat	Player	FL2	FAC	Total
FW	(England)	Jack Holliday	27	0	27
FW	(Wales)	Idris Hopkins	21	0	21
FW	(England)	Ernest Muttitt	12	0	12
FW	(England)	Billy Scott	12	0	12
FW	(England)	Charlie Fletcher	10	0	10
FW	(England)	Ralph Allen	1	0	1
HB	(England)	Joe James	1	0	1
Total			85	0	85

- Players listed in italics left the club mid-season.
- Source: 100 Years of Brentford

=== Amateur international caps ===
Pos.	Nat	Player	Caps	Goals	Ref
FW	(England)	Jackie Burns	3	1	

=== Management ===
Name	Nat	From	To	Record All Comps					Record League				
Name	Nat	From	To	P	W	D	L	W %	P	W	D	L	W %
Harry Curtis	(England)	26 August 1933	5 May 1933	43	22	7	14	51.16|	42	22	7	13	52.38

=== Summary ===
Games played	43 (42 Second Division, 1 FA Cup)
Games won	22 (22 Second Division, 0 FA Cup)
Games drawn	7 (7 Second Division, 0 FA Cup)
Games lost	14 (13 Second Division, 1 FA Cup)
Goals scored	85 (85 Second Division, 0 FA Cup)
Goals conceded	61 (60 Second Division, 1 FA Cup)
Clean sheets	11 (11 Second Division, 0 FA Cup)
Biggest league win	5–0 versus Lincoln City, 28 April 1934
Worst league defeat	5–2 versus Bradford Park Avenue, 6 September 1933
Most appearances	43, Charlie Fletcher, Idris Hopkins (42 Second Division, 1 FA Cup)
Top scorer (league)	27, Jack Holliday
Top scorer (all competitions)	27, Jack Holliday

== Transfers & loans ==
Cricketers are not included in this list.

Players transferred in
Date	Pos.	Name	Previous club	Fee	Ref.
June 1933	DF	(England) Jack Astley	(England) Southport	Free	
June 1933	GK	(England) Jack Clough	(England) Mansfield Town	£100	
June 1933	HB	(England) Joe McClure	(England) Everton	Free	
17 August 1933	FW	(England) Charlie Fletcher	(England) Clapton Orient	Part-exchange	
1933	FW	Maurice Batchelor	(England) Gillingham	Amateur	
1933	FW	(Scotland) Peter Clarke	(Scotland) Edinburgh University	Amateur	
1933	FW	R. E. Gibbons	(England) Tunbridge Wells Rangers	n/a	
1933	FW	(England) George Goddard	(England) Queens Park Rangers	n/a	
1933	FW	(England) Bob Mortimer	(England) Northampton Town	n/a	
1933	FW	(England) William Smith	(England) Sheffield Wednesday	Free	
January 1934	DF	(England) Arthur Bateman	(England) Southend United	n/a	
March 1934	DF	(England) Walter Metcalf	(England) Sunderland	n/a	
April 1934	HB	(England) James Raven	(England) Folkestone	Amateur	
Players transferred out
Date	Pos.	Name	Subsequent club	Fee	Ref.
17 August 1933	HB	(England) Teddy Ware	(England) Clapton Orient	Part-exchange	
27 October 1933	FW	(England) William Smith	(England) Crystal Palace	n/a	
1933	FW	(England) George Goddard	(England) Wolverhampton Wanderers	n/a	
Players released
Date	Pos.	Name	Subsequent club	Join date	Ref.
September 1933	FW	Maurice Batchelor	(England) Hounslow Town	Amateur	
May 1934	DF	(Scotland) Tom Adamson	(England) Stockport County	1934	
May 1934	HB	(Scotland) Jimmy Bain	Retired		
May 1934	GK	(England) Tom Baker	(England) Northampton Town	1934	
May 1934	GK	(England) Jack Clough	(England) Rotherham United	May 1934	
May 1934	DF	(England) Jack French	(England) Tunbridge Wells Rangers	n/a	
May 1934	HB	(England) Joe McClure	(England) Exeter City	1934	
May 1934	FW	(England) Bob Mortimer	(England) Bournemouth & Boscombe Athletic	1934	
May 1934	FW	(Scotland) Alexander Stevenson	(England) Southend United	1934	
