= Joe McClure =

English footballer and manager

Personal information
- Full name: Joseph Henry McClure
- Date of birth: 3 November 1907
- Place of birth: Cockermouth, England
- Date of death: 1973 (aged 65–66)
- Place of death: Derbyshire, England
- Height: 5 ft 9 1/2 in (1.77 m)
- Position: Wing half

Senior career*
Years	Team	Apps	(Gls)
- Egremont
- Workington
1926	Preston North End	0	(0)
- Whitehaven Athletic
- Preston North End
- Leamington Town
- Wallsend
1929–1933	Everton	29	(1)
1933–1934	Brentford	1	(0)
1934–1936	Exeter City	5	(0)
1936–1937	Nuneaton Town		(3)

International career
1931	The FA XI	1	

Managerial career
- 1936–1937: Nuneaton Town (player-manager)
- * Club domestic league appearances and goals

Joseph Henry McClure (3 November 1907 – 1973) was an English footballer who played in the Football League and is remembered for his four years as a wing half with Everton. He later became a manager in non-League football with Nuneaton Town.

== Personal life ==
McClure grew up in Workington with 10 siblings and his uncle was footballer Alec McClure. He had four children with his wife Martha, before he "virtually abandoned" the family in the 1920s when his football career took off and later had four children with another woman. Martha, who refused to divorce him, died in 1968. While with Wallsend, McClure trained to be a welder and he worked as a bar steward in later life. McClure's son Peter went on to play football for local Workington non-League club Salterbeck. His great-nephew is Jon McClure, lead singer of Sheffield band Reverend and the Makers.

== Career statistics ==
Appearances and goals by club, season and competition
Club	Season	League			FA Cup		Total	
Club	Season	Division	Apps	Goals	Apps	Goals	Apps	Goals
Everton	1929–30	First Division	2	0	0	0	2	0
Everton	1930–31	Second Division	15	1	5	0	20	1
Everton	1931–32	First Division	7	0	0	0	7	0
Everton	1932–33	First Division	5	0	0	0	5	0
Everton	Total		29	1	5	0	34	1
Brentford	1933–34	Second Division	1	0	0	0	1	0
Career total			30	1	5	0	35	1

== Honours ==
Everton

- Football League Second Division: 1930–31

Nuneaton Town

- Nuneaton Hospital Cup: 1937
