= Dennis Sullivan (cricketer) =

English cricketer

Personal information
- Born: 28 January 1883; Mitcham, Surrey, England
- Died: 28 November 1968 (aged 85); Harold Wood, Essex, England
- Batting: Right-handed
- Role: Wicket-keeper

Domestic team information
- Years: Team
- 1914 to 1921: Surrey
- 1922 to 1928: Glamorgan

Career statistics
Competition	First-class
Matches	136
Runs scored	971
Batting average	7.52
100s/50s	0/0
Top score	47*
Catches/stumpings	148/94
- Source: CricketArchive

Dennis Sullivan (28 January 1883 – 28 December 1968) was an English cricketer who played first-class cricket for Surrey and Glamorgan from 1914 to 1928. A wicketkeeper, he also represented Wales in first-class cricket.

Dennis Sullivan did not establish himself in the first-class game until he became Glamorgan's wicket-keeper in 1924, when he was 41. He continued as Glamorgan's chief wicket-keeper until 1928. He also made two first-class tours of Jamaica in 1926/27 and 1927/28 in teams led by Lionel Tennyson.

Sullivan's son Les became a footballer.
