= Matt Johnson (English footballer) =

English footballer

Personal information
- Full name: Matthew Harrison Johnson
- Date of birth: 26 July 1910
- Place of birth: South Shields, England
- Date of death: 1988 (aged 77–78)
- Height: 5 ft 9 1/2 in (1.77 m)
- Positions: Outside left; centre forward

Youth career
- White Lea Juniors

Senior career*
| Years | Team | Apps | (Gls) |
| –1932 | Harton Colliery | | |
| 1932–1933 | Sheffield Wednesday | 0 | (0) |
| 1933–1934 | Hartlepools United | 6 | (0) |
| 1934–1935 | Northwich Victoria | | |
| 1934–1935 | Brentford | 0 | (0) |
| 1935–1936 | Rochdale | 19 | (5) |
| 1936–1937 | Darwen | | |
| 1937–1939 | Crewe Alexandra | 83 | (25) |
- * Club domestic league appearances and goals

Matthew Harrison Johnson (26 July 1910 – 1988) was an English professional footballer who played as a forward in the Football League for Crewe Alexandra, Rochdale and Hartlepools United.

== Career statistics ==
Appearances and goals by club, season and competition
| Club | Season | League | | | National cup (Note: Includes FA Cup) | | Other | | Total | |
| Club | Season | Division | Apps | Goals | Apps | Goals | Apps | Goals | Apps | Goals |
|---|---|---|---|---|---|---|---|---|---|---|
| Hartlepools United | 1933–34 | Third Division North | 6 | 0 | 0 | 0 | 0 | 0 | 6 | 0 |
| Rochdale | 1935–36 | Third Division North | 15 | 5 | 1 | 0 | 1 (Note: Appearance in Third Division North Cup) | 1 | 17 | 6 |
| Rochdale | 1936–37 | Third Division North | 4 | 0 | 0 | 0 | 1 | 0 | 5 | 0 |
| Rochdale | Total | | 19 | 5 | 1 | 0 | 2 | 1 | 22 | 6 |
| Career total | | | 25 | 5 | 1 | 0 | 2 | 1 | 28 | 6 |
