= Alexander Stevenson (footballer) =

Scottish footballer

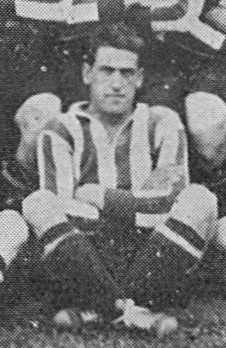
- Stevenson while with Brentford in 1927.

Personal information
- Full name: Alexander Stevenson
- Date of birth: 24 October 1903
- Place of birth: Airdrie, Scotland
- Positions: Right back; centre forward

Senior career*
Years	Team	Apps	(Gls)
1926–1927	Airdrieonians	14	(2)
1927	Detroit		
1927	Armadale	11	(2)
1927–1934	Brentford	125	(0)
1934–1935	Southend United	11	(0)
- Ards
- Ross County
- * Club domestic league appearances and goals

Alexander Stevenson was a Scottish professional footballer who made over 120 Football League appearances as a right back for Brentford. He also played in the United States and Northern Ireland.

== Career ==
=== Early years ===
Starting as a centre forward, Stevenson began his career with hometown Scottish League First Division club Airdrieonians. He later dropped down to the Second Division to sign for Armadale and also played in the United States for Detroit.

=== Brentford ===
Stevenson moved to England to sign for Third Division South club Brentford during the 1927 off-season. After converting to a right back, he broke into the team during the 1928–29 season and made 21 appearances. He was an integral part of the team and was part of the team which was promoted as champions to the Second Division in the 1932–33 season. Stevenson lost his right back position to new signing Jack Astley during the 1933–34 season and made just three appearances before departing the club at the end of the campaign. In seven years at Griffin Park, Stevenson made 134 appearances.

=== Southend United ===
Stevenson joined Third Division South club Southend United during the 1934 off-season. He made just 12 appearances for the struggling club and departed at the end of the 1934–35 season.

=== Later career ===
Stevenson moved to Northern Ireland for a spell with Irish League club Ards, managed by former Brentford full back partner Tom Adamson. He ended his career back in Scotland with Highland League club Ross County.

== Honours ==
Brentford

- Football League Third Division South: 1932–33

== Career statistics ==
Appearances and goals by club, season and competition
Club	Season	League			National Cup		Other		Total	
Club	Season	Division	Apps	Goals	Apps	Goals	Apps	Goals	Apps	Goals
Airdrieonians	1926–27	Scottish First Division	14	2	2	0	—		16	2
Armadale	1926–27	Scottish Second Division	11	2	0	0	—		11	2
Brentford	1927–28	Third Division South	2	0	0	0	—		2	0
Brentford	1928–29	Third Division South	21	0	0	0	—		21	0
Brentford	1929–30	Third Division South	32	0	1	0	—		33	0
Brentford	1930–31	Third Division South	26	0	5	0	—		31	0
Brentford	1931–32	Third Division South	14	0	2	0	—		16	0
Brentford	1932–33	Third Division South	27	0	1	0	—		28	0
Brentford	1933–34	Second Division	3	0	0	0	—		3	0
Brentford	Total		125	0	9	0	—		134	0
Southend United	1934–35	Third Division South	11	0	0	0	1 (Note: Appearance in Third Division South Cup)	0	12	0
Career total			161	4	11	0	1	0	173	4
