= Reuben Woolhouse =

English footballer

Personal information
- Date of birth: 25 November 1904
- Place of birth: Brightside, England
- Date of death: 1986 (aged 81)
- Place of death: Walsall, England
- Height: 5 ft 11 in (1.80 m)
- Position: Outside left

Senior career*
Years	Team	Apps	(Gls)
- Ecclesfield United
- Birmingham
- Southend United
- Loughborough Corinthians
1930–1932	Bradford City	26	(5)
- Coventry City
- Walsall
- Swindon Town
- * Club domestic league appearances and goals

Reuben Woolhouse (25 November 1904 – 1986) was an English professional footballer who played as an outside left.

== Career ==
Born in Birmingham, Woolhouse spent his early career with Ecclesfield United, Birmingham, Southend United and Loughborough Corinthians. He signed for Bradford City from Loughborough Corinthians in May 1930. He made 26 league appearances for the club, scoring 5 goals, before joining Coventry City in July 1932. He later played for Walsall and Swindon Town.

== Sources ==
- Frost, Terry (1988). Bradford City A Complete Record 1903-1988. Breedon Books Sport. ISBN 0-907969-38-0.
