= Charlie Fletcher (footballer) =

English footballer

Personal information
- Full name: Charles Alfred Fletcher
- Date of birth: 28 October 1905
- Place of birth: Homerton, England
- Date of death: 22 August 1980 (aged 74)
- Place of death: Hither Green, England
- Height: 5 ft 11 in (1.80 m)
- Position: Outside left

Senior career*
Years	Team	Apps	(Gls)
–1928	Clapton Orient	0	(0)
1928–1929	Crystal Palace	7	(0)
1929–1930	Merthyr Town	24	(1)
1930–1933	Clapton Orient	120	(32)
1933–1936	Brentford	103	(24)
1936–1937	Burnley	62	(21)
1937–1938	Plymouth Argyle	23	(6)
1938–1945	Ipswich Town	29	(9)
1945	Leyton Orient		
Total		321	(93)
- * Club domestic league appearances and goals

Charles Alfred Fletcher (28 October 1905 – 22 August 1980) was an English professional footballer, best remembered for his spells as an outside left in the Football League with Clapton Orient and Brentford.

== Career ==
An outside left, Fletcher began his career at Clapton Orient and failed trials with Football League clubs Aston Villa and Plymouth Argyle, before signing with Third Division South club Crystal Palace in 1928. He made seven league appearances during the 1928–29 season, before moving to division rivals Merthyr Town in August 1929. Fletcher returned to Clapton Orient, who had by then been relegated to the basement division, in 1930. He became a regular at the Lea Bridge Stadium and scored 32 goals in 120 league matches to earn the nickname "Thunderboots".

In August 1933, Fletcher moved across London to sign for newly promoted Second Division club Brentford in a swap deal for Percy Whipp. He was a virtual ever-present for the Bees during the 1933–34 and 1934–35 seasons and won promotion to the First Division with the club. He fell out with manager Harry Curtis in November 1935 and dropped to the Second Division to sign for Burnley in February 1936 and then Plymouth Argyle in November 1937. Fletcher transferred to Ipswich Town in November 1938 (during the club's debut league season) and remained registered at Portman Road during the Second World War. After the war, Fletcher returned to the now-renamed Leyton Orient in December 1945, but at age 40, he failed to make an appearance.

== Personal life ==
Fletcher attended Colegrave School and Stratford School in London. Prior to becoming a professional footballer, he worked as a timber grinder. During the Second World War, Fletcher worked as a lorry driver and then as a foreman in a munitions factory.

== Career statistics ==
Appearances and goals by club, season and competition
Club	Season	League			FA Cup		Total	
Club	Season	Division	Apps	Goals	Apps	Goals	Apps	Goals
Brentford	1933–34	Second Division	41	10	1	0	42	10
Brentford	1934–35	Second Division	42	9	1	0	43	9
Brentford	1935–36	First Division	20	5	0	0	20	5
Brentford	Total		103	24	2	0	105	24
Plymouth Argyle	1937–38	Second Division	18	5	1	0	19	5
Plymouth Argyle	1938–39	Second Division	5	1	0	0	5	1
Plymouth Argyle	Total		23	6	1	0	24	6
Ipswich Town	1938–39	Third Division South	29	9	5	1	34	10
Career total			155	39	8	1	163	40

== Honours ==
Brentford

- Football League Second Division: 1934–35
