= Les Sullivan =

English footballer

Personal information
- Full name: Leslie Gordon Sullivan
- Date of birth: 6 August 1912
- Place of birth: Croydon, England
- Date of death: January 1996 (aged 83)
- Place of death: Stockport, England
- Height: 5 ft 8 in (1.73 m)
- Position(s): Outside left

Senior career*
Years	Team	Apps	(Gls)
1932	Gillingham		
1932	Burn Naze		
1932–1933	Fleetwood		
1933	Blackburn Rovers	0	(0)
1933–1934	Lytham		
1934–1935	Rochdale	32	(9)
1935–1936	Brentford	0	(0)
1936–1937	Bristol Rovers	39	(10)
1938–1939	Chesterfield	7	(0)
1939	Stockport County	0	(0)
1939	Macclesfield	0	(0)
- *Club domestic league appearances and goals

Leslie Gordon Sullivan (6 August 1912 – January 1996) was an English professional footballer who played as an outside left in the Football League for Bristol Rovers, Rochdale and Chesterfield.

== Personal life ==
Sullivan was the son of cricketer Dennis Sullivan.

== Career statistics ==
Appearances and goals by club, season and competition
Club	Season	League			FA Cup		Other		Total	
Club	Season	Division	Apps	Goals	Apps	Goals	Apps	Goals	Apps	Goals
Rochdale	1934–35	Third Division North	32	9	0	0	1 (Note: Appearance in Third Division North Cup)	0	33	9
Bristol Rovers	1935–36	Third Division South	0	0	―		1 (Note: Appearance in Bristol Hospitals Cup)		1	0
Bristol Rovers	1936–37	Third Division South	25	6	1	0	1 (Note: Appearance in Gloucestershire Senior Cup)		27	6
Bristol Rovers	1937–38	Third Division South	14	4	1	0	2 (Note: Appearances in Third Division South Cup)		17	4
Bristol Rovers	Total		39	10	2	0	4		45	10
Chesterfield	1938–39	Second Division	7	0	2	0	―		9	0
Career total			78	19	4	0	5	0	87	19
