= William Smith (footballer, born 1903) =

English footballer

Personal information
- Full name: William Shiel Smith
- Date of birth: 22 October 1903
- Place of birth: South Shields, England
- Height: 5 ft 9 in (1.75 m)
- Position: Wing half

Senior career*
Years	Team	Apps	(Gls)
1929–1932	Sheffield Wednesday	29	(1)
1933	Brentford	1	(0)
1933–1936	Crystal Palace	41	(1)
1936–1938	Burnley	53	(0)
1939	Accrington Stanley	1	(0)
- * Club domestic league appearances and goals

William Shiel Smith (22 October 1903 – ?) was an English professional footballer who played as a wing half in the Football League for Burnley, Crystal Palace and Sheffield Wednesday.

== Career statistics ==
Appearances and goals by club, season and competition
Club	Season	League			FA Cup		Total	
Club	Season	Division	Apps	Goals	Apps	Goals	Apps	Goals
Sheffield Wednesday	1929–30	First Division	4	0	0	0	4	0
Sheffield Wednesday	1930–31	First Division	7	0	0	0	7	0
Sheffield Wednesday	1931–32	First Division	17	1	0	0	17	1
Sheffield Wednesday	1932–33	First Division	1	0	0	0	1	0
Sheffield Wednesday	Total		29	1	0	0	29	1
Brentford	1933–34	Second Division	1	0	0	0	1	0
Career total			30	1	0	0	30	1
