= Joe Wiggins =

English footballer

Personal information
- Full name: Joseph Albert Wiggins
- Date of birth: 1 April 1909
- Place of birth: Alperton, England
- Date of death: 1982 (aged 72–73)
- Height: 6 ft 0 in (1.83 m)
- Positions: Centre forward; full back

Senior career*
Years	Team	Apps	(Gls)
- Hanwell Town
–1927	Grays Thurrock United		
1927–1928	Brentford	4	(2)
1928–1934	Leicester City	9	(0)
1934–1935	Gillingham	12	(0)
1935–1936	Rochdale	27	(14)
1936	Oldham Athletic	3	(0)
- Stalybridge Celtic
- Hurst
- Rhyl
- * Club domestic league appearances and goals

Joseph Albert Wiggins (1 April 1909 – 1982) was an English professional footballer who played as a centre forward and full back for Brentford, Leicester City, Gillingham, Rochdale and Oldham Athletic in the Football League. He also played for Hanwell Town, Grays Thurrock, Stalybridge Celtic, Hurst and Rhyl.

== Career statistics ==
Appearances and goals by club, season and competition
Club	Season	League			FA Cup		Total	
Club	Season	Division	Apps	Goals	Apps	Goals	Apps	Goals
Brentford	1927–28	Third Division South	4	2	0	0	4	2
Leicester City	1930–31	First Division	2	0	0	0	2	0
Leicester City	1931–32	First Division	3	0	0	0	3	0
Leicester City	1932–33	First Division	4	0	0	0	4	0
Leicester City	Total		9	0	0	0	9	0
Gillingham (loan)	1934–35	Third Division South	12	0	0	0	12	0
Rochdale	1935–36	Third Division North	27	14	0	0	27	14
Career total			52	16	0	0	52	16
