= Tom Adamson =

Scottish footballer and manager

Personal information
- Full name: Thomas Kay Adamson
- Date of birth: 12 February 1897
- Place of birth: Mossend, Scotland
- Date of death: 21 October 1959 (aged 62)
- Place of death: Kettering, Northamptonshire
- Height: 5 ft 11 in (1.80 m)
- Position: Left back

Youth career
- 1913–1914: Craighead
- 1914–: Cambuslang Rangers

Senior career*
Years	Team	Apps	(Gls)
1919–1920	Blantyre Celtic		
1920–1928	Bury	271	(0)
1929–1934	Brentford	141	(0)
1934–1935	Stockport County	0	(0)
1935	Ards		

Managerial career
- 1935: Ards (player-manager)
- * Club domestic league appearances and goals

Thomas Kay Adamson (12 February 1897 – 21 October 1959) was a Scottish professional footballer, best remembered for his time as a left back in the Football League with Bury and Brentford. He later had a short tenure as player-manager of Irish League club Ards.

== Playing career ==
=== Early years and Bury ===
A left back, Adamson began his career at Scottish junior clubs Craighead, Cambuslang Rangers, Blantyre Celtic and moved to England to join Second Division club Bury in 1920. Over the course of 9 years at Gigg Lane, Adamson made 286 appearances and helped the Shakers to promotion back to the First Division in the 1923–24 season.

=== Brentford ===
Adamson dropped down to the Third Division South to sign for Brentford prior to the beginning of the 1929–30 season. He immediately broke into the team and made 36 appearances during his debut season, a campaign memorable for the Bees' record-breaking 21 home wins.

Adamson was a mainstay of the team for the following two seasons and made 28 appearances to help the Bees to the Third Division South title in the 1932–33 season. Age caught up to Adamson and he made just eight appearances during the 1933–34 Second Division season, before departing Griffin Park at the end of the campaign. Adamson made 153 appearances in five seasons with the Bees.

=== Stockport County ===
Adamson returned to the Manchester area to sign for Third Division North club Stockport County in 1934. He failed to make an appearance for the club and ended his Football League career in 1935, having failed to score in over 400 professional matches.

== Managerial career ==
Adamson had a short spell as player-manager of Irish League club Ards in 1935. Former Brentford full back partner Alexander Stevenson was one of his signings.

== Personal life ==
While growing up, Adamson went to school with future Scottish internationals Hughie Gallacher and Alex James.

== Career statistics ==
Appearances and goals by club, season and competition
Club	Season	League			FA Cup		Total	
Club	Season	Division	Apps	Goals	Apps	Goals	Apps	Goals
Brentford	1929–30	Third Division South	35	0	1	0	36	0
Brentford	1930–31	Third Division South	36	0	5	0	41	0
Brentford	1931–32	Third Division South	35	0	5	0	40	0
Brentford	1932–33	Third Division South	27	0	1	0	28	0
Brentford	1933–34	Second Division	8	0	0	0	8	0
Career total			141	0	12	0	153	0

== Honours ==
Blantyre Celtic

- Lanarkshire Cup: 1919–20

Brentford

- Football League Third Division South: 1932–33
