= Harry Marshall (English footballer) =

English footballer (1905-1959)

Personal information
- Full name: William Harry Marshall
- Date of birth: 16 February 1905
- Place of birth: Hucknall, England
- Date of death: 9 March 1959 (aged 54)
- Place of death: Linby, England
- Height: 5 ft 8 in (1.73 m)
- Position: Inside forward

Youth career
- Hucknall Primitives
- Bromley's Athletic

Senior career*
| Years | Team | Apps | (Gls) |
| 1923–1925 | Nottingham Forest | 19 | (3) |
| 1925–1927 | Southport | 54 | (27) |
| 1927–1930 | Wolverhampton Wanderers | 52 | (13) |
| 1930–1932 | Port Vale | 55 | (7) |
| 1932 | Tottenham Hotspur | 1 | (0) |
- Kidderminster Harriers
- Brierley Hill Alliance
| 1935–1937 | Rochdale | 95 | (22) |
- Linfield
| Total | | 276+ | (72+) |
- * Club domestic league appearances and goals

William Henry Marshall (16 February 1905 – 9 March 1959) was an English footballer who played at inside-forward. He scored 71 goals in 276 league appearances in the Football League, playing for Nottingham Forest, Southport, Wolverhampton Wanderers, Port Vale, Tottenham Hotspur, and Rochdale.

== Career ==
Marshall played for Hucknall Primitives and Bromley's Athletic before joining Nottingham Forest in 1923. Forest finished just one place above the First Division relegation zone in 1923–24, finishing ahead of Chelsea on goal average. They were then relegated in last place in 1924–25, and Marshall moved on to Southport of the Third Division North. He scored 27 goals in 54 league games for the "Sandgrounders" and was sold to Wolverhampton Wanderers at the end of 1926–27. Wolves finished 16th in the Second Division in 1927–28 and 17th in 1928–29.

He signed with Port Vale for a sizeable outlay in March 1930. He was initially a roaring success at Vale, scoring on his debut in a 2–0 win at Accrington Stanley on 15 March 1930, though only made three further appearances in 1929–30 as the club raced to the Third Division North title. He regularly made the first team from October 1930, though he scored just twice in 24 Second Division appearances in 1930–31. He scored three goals in 29 games in 1931–32, including two against Potteries derby rivals Stoke City at the Old Recreation Ground.

He was sold to league rivals Tottenham Hotspur in March 1932. After leaving "Spurs" he played for Birmingham & District League clubs Kidderminster Harriers and Brierley Hill Alliance, before joining Third Division North side Rochdale in 1935. The club finished just one place and two points above the re-election zone in 1935–36 and were just three points above the (potential) drop zone in 1936–37. He later ended his career in Northern Ireland with Linfield.

== Career statistics ==
Appearances and goals by club, season and competition
| Club | Season | League | | | FA Cup | | N/S Cup | | Total | |
| Club | Season | Division | Apps | Goals | Apps | Goals | Apps | Goals | Apps | Goals |
|---|---|---|---|---|---|---|---|---|---|---|
| Nottingham Forest | 1923–24 | First Division | 7 | 2 | 0 | 0 | — | | 7 | 2 |
| Nottingham Forest | 1924–25 | First Division | 9 | 0 | 0 | 0 | — | | 9 | 0 |
| Nottingham Forest | 1925–26 | Second Division | 3 | 1 | 0 | 0 | — | | 3 | 1 |
| Nottingham Forest | Total | | 19 | 3 | 0 | 0 | 0 | 0 | 19 | 3 |
| Southport | 1926–27 | Third Division North | 30 | 14 | 2 | 0 | — | | 32 | 14 |
| Southport | 1927–28 | Third Division North | 24 | 13 | 4 | 2 | — | | 28 | 15 |
| Southport | Total | | 54 | 27 | 6 | 2 | 0 | 0 | 60 | 29 |
| Wolverhampton Wanderers | 1927–28 | Second Division | 11 | 3 | 0 | 0 | — | | 11 | 3 |
| Wolverhampton Wanderers | 1928–29 | Second Division | 17 | 3 | 1 | 0 | — | | 18 | 3 |
| Wolverhampton Wanderers | 1929–30 | Second Division | 24 | 7 | 1 | 0 | — | | 25 | 7 |
| Wolverhampton Wanderers | Total | | 52 | 13 | 2 | 0 | 0 | 0 | 54 | 13 |
| Port Vale | 1929–30 | Third Division North | 4 | 1 | 0 | 0 | — | | 4 | 1 |
| Port Vale | 1930–31 | Second Division | 24 | 2 | 0 | 0 | — | | 24 | 2 |
| Port Vale | 1931–32 | Second Division | 27 | 4 | 2 | 0 | — | | 29 | 4 |
| Port Vale | Total | | 55 | 7 | 2 | 0 | 0 | 0 | 57 | 7 |
| Tottenham Hotspur | 1931–32 | Second Division | 1 | 0 | 0 | 0 | — | | 1 | 0 |
| Rochdale | 1935–36 | Third Division North | 31 | 9 | 0 | 0 | 0 | 0 | 31 | 9 |
| Rochdale | 1936–37 | Third Division North | 34 | 7 | 1 | 0 | 0 | 0 | 35 | 7 |
| Rochdale | 1937–38 | Third Division North | 30 | 6 | 1 | 0 | 1 | 0 | 32 | 6 |
| Rochdale | Total | | 95 | 22 | 2 | 0 | 1 | 0 | 98 | 22 |
| Career total | | | 276 | 72 | 12 | 2 | 1 | 0 | 289 | 74 |

== Honours ==
Port Vale

- Football League Third Division North: 1929–30
