= Cecil Smith (footballer, born 1907) =

English footballer

Personal information
- Full name: Cecil Sydney Frank Smith
- Date of birth: 16 June 1907
- Place of birth: Hounslow, England
- Date of death: 1990 (aged 82–83)
- Height: 5 ft 9 in (1.75 m)
- Position: Left half

Senior career*
Years	Team	Apps	(Gls)
- Brentford Market
1931–1936	Brentford	3	(0)
1936–1939	Doncaster Rovers	68	(2)
- * Club domestic league appearances and goals

Cecil Sydney Frank Smith (16 June 1907 – 1990) was an English footballer who played in the Football League for Brentford and Doncaster Rovers as a left half.

== Club career ==
=== Brentford ===
Smith began his career at non-League club Brentford Market and joined local Football League Third Division South club Brentford in August 1931. He failed to make an appearance during the 1931–32 and 1932–33 seasons, by which time the Bees had been promoted to the Second Division. Smith finally made his debut midway through the 1933–34 season, in a 3–2 defeat to West Ham United on 6 January 1934. He missed the entire 1934–35 season, in which Brentford were promoted to the First Division for the first time in the club's history, though he did win the London Challenge Cup with the reserve team. Smith departed Griffin Park in November 1936, after making just three first team appearances in five years with Brentford.

=== Doncaster Rovers ===
Smith joined Second Division strugglers Doncaster Rovers in November 1936. He made 68 league appearances and scored two goals before leaving at the end of the 1938–39 season.

== Career statistics ==
Appearances and goals by club, season and competition
Club	Season	League			FA Cup		Total	
Club	Season	Division	Apps	Goals	Apps	Goals	Apps	Goals
Brentford	1933–34	Second Division	1	0	0	0	1	0
Brentford	1935–36	First Division	1	0	0	0	1	0
Brentford	1936–37	First Division	1	0	—		1	0
Career total			3	0	0	0	3	0

== Honours ==
Brentford

- London Challenge Cup: 1934–35
