= Teddy Ivill =

English footballer (1898–1979)

Personal information
- Full name: Edward Ivill
- Date of birth: 7 December 1898
- Place of birth: Little Hulton, England
- Date of death: 1979 (aged 80–81)
- Position: Full-back

Senior career*
Years	Team	Apps	(Gls)
1914–1919	New Lester Colliery		
1919–1920	Brookhouses		
1920–1921	Williams Temperance		
1921–1922	Boothstown		
1922–1923	Bolton Wanderers	0	(0)
1923–1924	Atherton		
1924–1932	Oldham Athletic	276	(2)
1932–1933	Wolverhampton Wanderers	4	(0)
1933–1935	Charlton Athletic	35	(0)
1935–1937	Accrington Stanley	16	(0)
1937	Clitheroe		
Total		331	(2)
- * Club domestic league appearances and goals

Edward Ivill (7 December 1898 – 1979) was an English footballer who played in the Football League for Accrington Stanley, Charlton Athletic, Oldham Athletic and Wolverhampton Wanderers.
