= Brian Jarvis =

Welsh footballer

Personal information
- Full name: John Brian Jarvis
- Date of birth: 26 August 1933
- Place of birth: Bangor-on-Dee, Wales
- Date of death: 2004 (aged 70–71)
- Place of death: Shrewsbury, England
- Position: Wing half

Senior career*
Years	Team	Apps	(Gls)
1952–1959	Wrexham	64	(3)
1959–1963	Oldham Athletic	88	(2)
- Altrincham
- * Club domestic league appearances and goals

John Brian Jarvis (26 August 1933 – January 2004) was a Welsh professional footballer who played as a wing half. He played in the English Football League for Wrexham and Oldham Athletic.
