= Bill Ratcliffe (footballer) =

English footballer (1909–2003)

Personal information
- Full name: Beaumont Ratcliffe
- Date of birth: 24 April 1909
- Place of birth: Bolton upon Dearne
- Date of death: 2003 (aged 93–94)
- Height: 5 ft 10 1/2 in (1.79 m)
- Position: Central defender

Senior career*
Years	Team	Apps	(Gls)
1928	Mexborough Athletic		
1929	Thurnscoe Victoria		
1930	Bolton Albion		
1930-1931	Bradford Park Avenue		
1931-1932	Charlton Athletic		
1931-1935	New Brighton	131	(4)
1935	Le Havre		
1935-1939	Oldham Athletic	156	(1)
1946-1949	Reading	32	(0)
1948-1949	Watford	24	(0)
1949	Runcorn		
1951	Earlestown		
Total		343	(5)
- * Club domestic league appearances and goals

Beaumont Ratcliffe (1909-2003) was an English footballer who played as a central defender for New Brighton, Oldham Athletic, Reading and Watford.
