= Syd Protheroe =

Welsh footballer (1910–1982)

Personal information
- Full name: Sydney Protheroe
- Date of birth: 16 December 1910
- Place of birth: Dowlais, Wales
- Date of death: 19 February 1982 (aged 71)
- Place of death: Nottingham, England
- Position: Winger

Senior career*
Years	Team	Apps	(Gls)
1930	Dowlais Welfare		
1931–1932	Charlton Athletic	0	(0)
1932	Machynlleth		
1932	Merthyr Town		
1933–1934	Wolverhampton Wanderers	0	(0)
1934–1936	Torquay United	38	(3)
1936–1938	Rochdale	63	(13)
1938–1939	Notts County	2	(0)
Total		103	(16)
- * Club domestic league appearances and goals

Sydney Protheroe (16 December 1910 – 1982) was a Welsh footballer who played as a winger for Merthyr Town, Torquay United, Rochdale and Notts County, as well as for various other non-league football clubs, during the 1930s.

== Career ==
After beginning his football career at Dowlais Welfare in 1930, Protheroe joined Charlton Athletic, but played no first team games. In 1932, he played for Machynlleth then turned professional with Merthyr Town. In May 1933, he joined Wolverhampton Wanderers but again played no first team games.

In August 1934, he made his Football League debut playing for Torquay United at Gillingham, but after a series of regular starts he became a fringe player. He moved to Rochdale in June 1936, where he played regularly over two seasons, scoring 14 goals in 66 appearances. However, he was not retained by Rochdale and was put on the transfer list (initially for £250, later reduced to £100), and in June 1938 he signed for Notts County, but, after suffering a broken fibula in September 1938, made just two appearances.

The 1939 England and Wales Register, taken in September 1939, recorded Protheroe living back in Wales, in Merthyr Tydfil, described as a "professional footballer". During World War II, Protheroe served with the RAF in the Middle East.

== Personal life ==
Protheroe married Vera Thorpe in Basford, Nottingham in 1941. She died in 1975 after jumping into a water-filled gravel pit. At the subsequent inquest in March 1975, Protheroe testified that his wife had suffered from a nervous complaint and had twice previously tried to take her own life. The inquest concluded she had taken her own life while mentally disturbed. Protheroe died on 19 February 1982 in Nottingham, aged 71.
