= Albert Thompson (footballer, born 1912) =

Welsh footballer

Personal information
- Full name: Albert Thompson
- Date of birth: 1912
- Place of birth: Llanbradach, Wales
- Height: 5 ft 10 in (1.78 m)
- Position: Striker

Senior career*
Years	Team	Apps	(Gls)
	Barry Town	?	(?)
1934–1936	Bradford Park Avenue	11	(2)
1936–1937	York City	24	(24)
1937	Swansea Town	4	(0)
	Wellington Town	?	(?)
- * Club domestic league appearances and goals

Albert Thompson (born 1912, date of death unknown) was a Welsh footballer.

== Career ==
Thompson was born in Llanbradach, Wales, and joined Bradford Park Avenue from Barry Town in 1934. After making 11 appearances and scoring two goals in the league for Bradford, he joined York City in 1936. He was York City's top scorer for the 1936–37 season, with 28 goals. He joined Swansea Town in 1937, after making 29 appearances and scoring 28 goals for York. After making 4 appearances in the league for Swansea, he joined Wellington Town.
