= Duncan Lindsay (Scottish footballer) =

Scottish footballer

Duncan Morton Lindsay (21 March 1903 in Cambuslang – 1972) was a Scottish professional football centre-forward.

Lindsay began his career with his local side Cambuslang Rangers. In 1925 he moved to East Fife and in April 1926 joined Cowdenbeath where he was converted from a winger to a centre-forward.

In May 1930, after 82 goals in 126 league games, Lindsay moved to Newcastle United for a fee of £2,700 as a potential replacement for Hughie Gallacher. Despite only playing 19 times in his only season with Newcastle (1930–31) he was top scorer with 12 goals. He moved to Bury in 1931 where he scored 17 times in 45 league games. After a loan spell with Ashton National, he joined Northampton Town, but played just once before joining Hurst and playing six Cheshire League Games towards the end of the 1933–34 season. He moved back to the Football League with Hartlepools United in 1934 and scored 26 times in 43 games for United during the 1934–35 season, but left at the end of the season to join Barrow. He played just eight games, scoring 3 times, for Barrow, before moving to York City in 1935. He left at the end of the season, after a further 8 goals in 25 games and returned to the Cheshire League with Ashton National then towards the end of the 1937–38 campaign rejoined Hurst for a second spell, now aged 36, playing in the last 9 games of the season and scoring three times.
