= Andrew Carr (footballer) =

English footballer (1908–1983)

Personal information
- Full name: Andrew Hughes Carr
- Date of birth: 13 March 1908
- Place of birth: Burradon, England
- Date of death: 1983 (aged 74–75)
- Height: 5 ft 10 1/2 in (1.79 m)
- Position: Defender

Senior career*
| Years | Team | Apps | (Gls) |
| 1926–1927 | Percy Main Amateurs | | |
| 1927–1928 | Washington Colliery | | |
| 1928–1929 | Burradon Colliery Welfare | | |
| 1930–1934 | Middlesbrough | 5 | (0) |
| 1934–1935 | Mansfield Town | 12 | (0) |
| 1935–1936 | Crewe Alexandra | 36 | (2) |
| 1936–1937 | Rochdale | 32 | (0) |
- * Club domestic league appearances and goals

Andrew Hughes Carr (13 March 1908 – 1983) was an English professional footballer who played in the Football League for Crewe Alexandra, Mansfield Town, Middlesbrough and Rochdale. Carr was the brother of Wilfred Carr, a centre forward for Newcastle United.
