= Charlie MacCartney =

English footballer

Personal information
- Full name: Charles William MacCartney
- Date of birth: 4 February 1910
- Place of birth: Stamford, Lincolnshire, England
- Date of death: 1982 (aged 71–72)
- Position: Centre forward

Senior career*
Years	Team	Apps	(Gls)
192?–1932	Stamford Town		
1932–1935	Notts County	50	(19)
1935–1937	Wrexham	28	(26)
1937	Carlisle United	4	(0)
1937–1938	York City	1	(0)
1938	Darlington	2	(0)
1938–1946	Peterborough United	42	(29)
–	Grantham		
- * Club domestic league appearances and goals

Charles William MacCartney (4 February 1910 – 1982) was an English footballer who played as a centre forward. He scored 45 goals from 85 appearances in the Football League playing for Notts County, Wrexham, Carlisle United, York City and Darlington. He also played non-league football for Stamford Town, Peterborough United and Grantham.
