= Harry Barley =

English footballer (1905–1958)

Personal information
- Full name: Henry Frank Barley
- Date of birth: 2 January 1905
- Place of birth: Grimsby, England
- Date of death: 1958 (aged 52–53)
- Position: Winger

Senior career*
Years	Team	Apps	(Gls)
1928	Humber United		
1928–1931	Grimsby Town	5	(1)
1931–1932	Hull City	13	(2)
1932–1934	New Brighton	21	(4)
1934	Notts County	11	(1)
1934–1935	Scunthorpe & Lindsey United		
1935–1936	Bristol Rovers	17	(5)
1936–1937	Barrow	40	(8)
1937–1938	Kidderminster Harriers		
1938–1939	Frickley Colliery		
1939–19??	Bath City		
- * Club domestic league appearances and goals

Henry Frank Barley (2 January 1905 – 1958) was an English professional footballer who played as a winger.
