= Charlie Robinson (footballer) =

English footballer (1907–1990)

Personal information
- Full name: Charles Robinson
- Date of birth: 8 June 1907
- Place of birth: Pegswood, England
- Date of death: 1990 (aged 82–83)
- Height: 5 ft 11 in (1.80 m)
- Position: Wing-half

Senior career*
Years	Team	Apps	(Gls)
1924–1925	Pegswood United		
1925	Amble		
1925	Stakeford United		
1926–1927	Ashington	1	(0)
1927–1928	Bedlington United		
1928–1929	Blackpool	5	(0)
1930–1933	Exeter City	8	(0)
1933–1935	Gillingham	34	(0)
1935–1936	Accrington Stanley	24	(0)
1936–1938	Rochdale	18	(0)
1938	Blyth Spartans		
Total		90	(0)
- * Club domestic league appearances and goals

Charles Robinson (8 June 1907 – 1990) was an English footballer who played in the Football League for Accrington Stanley, Ashington, Blackpool, Exeter City, Gillingham and Rochdale.
