= Tommy Bell (footballer, born 1923) =

English footballer

Personal information
- Full name: Thomas Anthony Peter Bell
- Date of birth: 30 December 1923
- Place of birth: Crompton, Lancashire, England
- Date of death: 21 November 1988 (aged 64)
- Place of death: Chadderton, Lancashire, England
- Position: Full back

Senior career*
Years	Team	Apps	(Gls)
????–1946	Glossop		
1946	Mossley		
1946–1952	Oldham Athletic	170	(0)
1952–1953	Stockport County	31	(0)
1953–1956	Halifax Town	117	(1)
1956–1958	Chorley		
1958–1959	Mossley		
1959–1960	Ashton United		
- * Club domestic league appearances and goals

Thomas Anthony Peter Bell (30 December 1923 – 21 November 1988) was an English professional footballer. A left-back, he played in 318 Football League matches for three clubs, most notably for hometown club Oldham Athletic. Bell features, along with his son Graham, amongst 'The Legends of Oldham Athletic'.

== Career ==
Born in Crompton near Oldham, Bell signed for Mossley from Glossop in 1946. Playing as a right-back, his performances during his 16 matches led to him signing for Third Division North club Oldham Athletic in late 1946. The fee of £550 was a record for a Mossley player.

Bell made his Oldham debut in their 1946–47 FA Cup second-round defeat by Doncaster Rovers on 14 December 1946. He appears to have played well: the Daily Mirror wrote that Bell "left the field thinking out the miserable tale he'd have to tell at home. Outside the ground was the usual mob of autograph hunters. Waiting, not for the stars of Doncaster's successful team, but for Tommy Bell, the man who played a 'blinder'."

After playing 170 league matches for Oldham, he signed for Stockport County in 1952. However, the following year he left to join Halifax Town, where he remained until 1956, making 117 appearances and scoring his only goal in the Football League. After leaving Halifax, he signed for Chorley, where he remained until rejoining Mossley during the 1958–59 season. The final season of his playing career, 1959–60, saw him join Ashton United, where he was appointed captain.
