= Philip Bartley =

English footballer

Personal information
- Full name: Philip James Bartley
- Date of birth: 23 December 1914
- Place of birth: Bentley, West Riding of Yorkshire, England
- Date of death: 1978 (aged 63–64)
- Position: Centre forward

Senior career*
Years	Team	Apps	(Gls)
1932–1933	Bentley Colliery		
1933–1934	Norwich City	0	(0)
1934–1935	Rochdale	14	(3)
1935–1936	Mansfield Town	2	(0)
1936	Scunthorpe & Lindsey United		
1936	Ollerton Colliery		
Total		16	(3)
- * Club domestic league appearances and goals

Philip James Bartley (23 December 1914 – 1978) was an English professional footballer who played in the Football League for Mansfield Town and Rochdale.
