= Tommy Seymour (footballer) =

English footballer (1906–1983)

Personal information
- Full name: Thomas Gilbert Seymour
- Date of birth: 2 May 1906
- Place of birth: Yarm
- Date of death: 1983 (aged 76–77)
- Position: Full-back

Senior career*
Years	Team	Apps	(Gls)
1919	Langley Park		
1922	Crook Town		
1923	Faversham United		
1924–1925	Bury		
1925	Crook Town		
1927–1928	Swansea City Town		
1928	Connah's Quay & Shotton		
1929–1936	Oldham Athletic	127	(0)
1936	Shrewsbury Town		
Total		127	(0)
- * Club domestic league appearances and goals

Thomas Gilbert Seymour (1906–1983) was an English footballer who played as a full-back for Oldham Athletic and also played non league football for several other clubs. He ended his playing career at Shrewsbury Town, where he later became a trainer and physiotherapist, while also running a business as a publican in Shrewsbury.
