= Graham Bell (footballer) =

English footballer (born 1955)

Personal information
- Full name: Graham Thomas Bell
- Date of birth: 30 March 1955 (age 71)
- Place of birth: Middleton, Lancashire, England
- Height: 5 ft 9 in (1.75 m)
- Position: Midfielder

Senior career*
Years	Team	Apps	(Gls)
- Chadderton
1974–1979	Oldham Athletic	170	(9)
1974	→ Denver Dynamos (loan)	17	(1)
1979–1983	Preston North End	143	(9)
1982	→ Huddersfield Town (loan)	2	(0)
1983–1984	Carlisle United	14	(0)
1984–1986	Bolton Wanderers	92	(3)
1986–1987	Tranmere Rovers	42	(4)
1987–1988	Hyde United	33	(0)
1988–1989	Mossley		
1989–1991	Hyde United	108	(1)
1991–1992	Mossley		
1992	Horwich RMI		

Managerial career
- 1988: Mossley
- 1989–1990: Hyde United
- * Club domestic league appearances and goals as of 18 August 2007

Graham Thomas Bell (born 30 March 1955 in Middleton, Lancashire) is an English former professional footballer who made more than 450 appearances in the English Football League representing Oldham Athletic, Preston North End, Huddersfield Town, Carlisle United, Bolton Wanderers and Tranmere Rovers, and played in the North American Soccer League for the Denver Dynamos.

== Career ==
After playing for non-League Chadderton, Bell started his professional career with Oldham Athletic, where his father Tommy had been a stalwart full back in the years after World War 2. Before he was spotted by the Oldham club at the age of 17, he had been working as an apprentice coach builder and playing for local club Chadderton F.C. Two years after signing amateur forms for Oldham, he made his entry into professional league football on 31 August 1974, in a 2–0 win over Bristol City. This was right at the beginning of Oldham's first season in the old 2nd Division for 40 years, and he was to play regularly from then on. During his first season in professional football Graham's performances caught the eye of England manager Don Revie, who placed him on standby for the full England squad. Never the biggest player around, his workrate and stamina couldn't be faulted, and his red hair also helped to make made him stand out in the Oldham midfield for the next five years, before he was transferred to Preston North End in March 1979 for what was then the considerable fee of £80,000.

After 143 games for Preston, which were interrupted by a brief loan spell at Huddersfield Town, he moved to Carlisle United in 1983, but was soon back in Lancashire with Bolton Wanderers. His two years at Bolton were followed by a season at Tranmere Rovers, before he moved into non-league football with Hyde United in 1987, having played in a total of 463 matches in the Football League.

Following a short stay at Hyde, in January 1988 he again followed his father's footsteps when he moved to Mossley. as player-assistant manager – his father having played there before joining Oldham in 1946 then returning again for the 1958–59 season. He served as caretaker manager in September and October 1988.

Bell returned to Hyde after the 1988–89 season for a two-season stint which would see him briefly serving as player-manager, returned to Mossley for the 1991–92 season and finished his playing career with a brief spell at Horwich RMI in 1992.

Graham features amongst both 'The Legends of Oldham Athletic' and 'The 100 Greatest PNE Post War Players'.

== Honours ==
Bolton Wanderers

- Associate Members' Cup runner-up: 1985–86
