= John Middleton (footballer, born 1910) =

English footballer (1910–1971

Personal information
- Full name: John Middleton
- Date of birth: 15 April 1910
- Place of birth: Mickley, England
- Date of death: 3 August 1971 (aged 61)
- Place of death: Darlington, England
- Height: 5 ft 8 in (1.73 m)
- Position: Inside right

Senior career*
Years	Team	Apps	(Gls)
- Mickley
1929–1930	Swansea Town	1	(0)
- Mickley
- Walker Celtic
1933–1935	Darlington	77	(22)
1935–1937	Blackpool	6	(3)
1937–1938	Norwich City	3	(0)
- South Shields
- * Club domestic league appearances and goals

John Middleton (15 April 1910 – 3 August 1971) was an English footballer who made 179 appearances in the Football League playing for Swansea Town, Darlington, Blackpool and Norwich City in the 1920s and 1930s. An inside right, he also played non-league football for clubs including Mickley, Walker Celtic and South Shields.
