= Harry Rowbotham =

English footballer

Personal information
- Full name: Henry Rowbotham
- Date of birth: 22 April 1911
- Place of birth: Willington Quay, Wallsend, England
- Date of death: 1979 (aged 67–68)
- Place of death: England
- Height: 5 ft 8 in (1.73 m)
- Position: Inside right

Youth career
- Cheddleton Mental Hospital

Senior career*
Years	Team	Apps	(Gls)
1931–1932	Port Vale	7	(2)
1932–1933	Hyde United	35	(10)
1933–1934	Accrington Stanley	4	(0)
1934–1936	Barrow	59	(14)
1936–1937	Rochdale	19	(1)
1937–1938	Tunbridge Wells Rangers		
Total		124+	(27+)
- * Club domestic league appearances and goals

Henry Rowbotham (22 April 1911 – 1979) was an English footballer who played at inside-right.

== Career ==
Rowbotham played for Cheddleton Mental Hospital before joining Port Vale in April 1931. He scored on his debut in a 1–0 win over Bradford City at the Old Recreation Ground on the last day of the season on 2 May 1931. The next season he was only used as a backup player however, and he scored one goal in a 4–1 win over Preston North End at Deepdale on 24 October, making six Second Division appearances. He was released upon the end of the season and moved on to Cheshire County League club Hyde United. He scored 12 goals in 41 matches for Hyde in the 1932–33 campaign. He moved on to Accrington Stanley, playing four Third Division North games in 1933–34. He then scored 14 goals in 59 Third Division North games for Barrow in 1934–35 and 1935–36. Rowbotham played 19 Third Division North games for Rochdale in 1936–37, scoring one goal, before he joined non-League Tunbridge Wells Rangers.

== Career statistics ==
Appearances and goals by club, season and competition
Club	Season	League			FA Cup		Other		Total	
Club	Season	Division	Apps	Goals	Apps	Goals	Apps	Goals	Apps	Goals
Port Vale	1930–31	Second Division	1	1	0	0	0	0	1	1
Port Vale	1931–32	Second Division	6	1	0	0	0	0	6	1
Port Vale	Total		7	2	0	0	0	0	7	2
Hyde United	1932–33	Cheshire County League	35	10	0	0	7	2	42	12
Accrington Stanley	1933–34	Third Division North	4	0	0	0	0	0	4	0
Barrow	1934–35	Third Division North	32	7	2	0	0	0	34	7
Barrow	1935–36	Third Division North	27	7	2	0	2	0	31	7
Barrow	Total		59	14	4	0	2	0	65	14
Rochdale	1936–37	Third Division North	19	1	1	0	0	0	20	1
Career total			124	27	5	0	9	2	138	29
