= Ehud Rogers =

Welsh footballer

Personal information
- Full name: Ehud Rogers
- Date of birth: 15 October 1909
- Place of birth: Chirk, Wales
- Date of death: 25 January 1996 (aged 86)
- Place of death: Chirk, Wales
- Height: 5 ft 6 in (1.68 m)
- Position: Outside right

Senior career*
Years	Team	Apps	(Gls)
- Weston Rhyn
- Llanerch Celts
- Chirk
- Oswestry Town
1934–1935	Wrexham	11	(2)
1935–1936	Arsenal	16	(5)
1936–1939	Newcastle United	56	(10)
1939–194?	Swansea Town	0	(0)
194?–1947	Wrexham	1	(0)
1947–19??	Oswestry Town		

International career
1934	Wales Amateur XI		
1941–1944	Wales wartime XI	2	(0)
- * Club domestic league appearances and goals

Ehud Rogers (15 October 1909 – 25 January 1996), commonly known as Tim Rogers, was a Welsh footballer who scored 17 goals from 84 appearances in the Football League playing for Wrexham, Arsenal and Newcastle United in the 1930s and 1940s. An outside right, Rogers appeared for Swansea Town in the abandoned 1939–40 Football League season, and played non-league football for Weston Rhyn, Llanerch Celts, Chirk, and Oswestry Town. Internationally, Rogers was capped for the Wales Amateur XI and played twice for his country in wartime internationals.

== Life and career ==
Rogers was born in Chirk, Wales, on 15 October 1909. His younger brother Joe also played League football, for Manchester City and Shrewsbury Town. Rogers played football in Wales for Weston Rhyn, Llanerch Celts, Chirk and Oswestry Town. He represented his country in an amateur international against Scotland in March 1934, and earned himself a reputation as "one of the finest Welsh amateur wingers playing [in the 1933–34] season", before turning professional with Football League Third Division North club Wrexham in May. By mid-season he had scored twice from eleven league appearances.

He signed for Arsenal in January 1935, and, with Joe Hulme and Alf Kirchen both injured, played in the last five First Division matches of the 1934–35 season. He scored twice on his debut, in an 8–0 win at home to Middlesbrough, and two matches later, was a member of the team that won 1–0 in the reverse fixture to ensure Arsenal won the 1934–35 Football League title – their third in a row. He played intermittently during the latter part of the following season, sometimes on the left wing rather than his more normal right, and took his appearance total to 16, all in league competition. He scored another three times, including both goals in a 2–0 home win against Middlesbrough.

Rogers signed for Second Division club Newcastle United in June 1936 for a £2,500 fee. He played in 38 matches in his first season, scoring 8 goals, but appeared in only 13 in the following campaign and just 5 in 1938–39. He joined Swansea Town in May 1939, and made three appearances before the 1939–40 Football League season was abandoned when war broke out.

During the war, Rogers served in the Royal Air Force and made guest appearances for clubs including Everton and Lovells Athletic. He played twice for his country in wartime internationals, both against England, in 1941 at Cardiff and in 1944 at Liverpool. He rejoined Wrexham between his two international appearances, and played once for them in the post-war Football League – at the age of nearly 38 – before returning to Oswestry Town.

After retiring as a player, Rogers returned to his native Chirk, where he worked as a newsagent and coached at his former club. He died in the town on 25 January 1996 at the age of 86.
