= Willie Jessop (footballer) =

English footballer

Personal information
- Full name: William Jessop
- Date of birth: 2 April 1922
- Place of birth: Preston, England
- Date of death: May 1994 (aged 72)
- Place of death: Stafford, England
- Position: Winger

Youth career
- 1940–1946: Preston North End

Senior career*
| Years | Team | Apps | (Gls) |
| 1946–1947 | Preston North End | 4 | (0) |
| 1947–1948 | Stockport County | 17 | (4) |
| 1948–1951 | Oldham Athletic | 94 | (16) |
| 1951–1952 | Wrexham | 14 | (2) |
- Bloxwich Strollers
- * Club domestic league appearances and goals

William Jessop (2 April 1922 – May 1994) was an English professional footballer who played as a winger. He made appearances in the English Football League for Preston North End, Stockport County, Oldham Athletic and Wrexham. He also played non-league football for Bloxwich Strollers.
