= Bert Humpish =

English footballer (1902–1986)

Personal information
- Full name: Albert Edward Humpish
- Date of birth: 3 March 1902
- Place of birth: Heaton, Newcastle, England
- Date of death: 26 September 1986 (aged 84)
- Place of death: Chester, England
- Height: 5 ft 7 in (1.70 m)
- Position: Half back

Senior career*
Years	Team	Apps	(Gls)
1921–1924	Halifax Town	8	(1)
1924–1925	Bury	2	(0)
1925–1929	Wigan Borough	161	(15)
1929–1930	Arsenal	3	(0)
1930–1932	Bristol City	36	(1)
1932–1934	Stockport County	58	(11)
1934–1936	Rochdale	31	(2)
1936–1937	Wigan Athletic	35	(10)
Total		334	(40)
- * Club domestic league appearances and goals

Albert Edward Humpish (3 March 1902 – 26 September 1986) was an English footballer who played in The Football League for Halifax Town, Bury, Wigan Borough, Arsenal, Bristol City, Stockport County and Rochdale. He also appeared for Wigan Athletic in the Cheshire League, appearing in 35 league games and scoring ten goals.
