= Jack Fryer (footballer, born 1911) =

English footballer

Personal information
- Full name: John Leavy Fryer
- Date of birth: 23 September 1911
- Place of birth: Runcorn, England
- Height: 5 ft 10 in (1.78 m)
- Position: Inside forward

Senior career*
Years	Team	Apps	(Gls)
	Runcorn	?	(?)
1930	Everton	0	(0)
1933–1937	Wrexham	82	(26)
1937–1938	Hull City	40	(23)
1938–1939	Nottingham Forest	22	(8)
Total		144	(57)
- * Club domestic league appearances and goals

John Leavy Fryer (23 September 1911) was an English footballer who played for Wrexham, Hull City and Nottingham Forest in the Football League.
