= Jack Clough (footballer) =

English footballer (1898–??)

Personal information
- Full name: John H. Clough
- Date of birth: 4 November 1898
- Place of birth: Murton, England
- Height: 5 ft 9 1/2 in (1.77 m)
- Position: Goalkeeper

Senior career*
Years	Team	Apps	(Gls)
1921–1922	Fatfield Albion		
1922–1926	Middlesbrough	124	(0)
1926–1932	Bradford Park Avenue	208	(0)
1932–1933	Mansfield Town	30	(0)
1933–1934	Brentford	20	(0)
1934–1937	Rotherham United	91	(0)
- * Club domestic league appearances and goals

John H. Clough MM & Bar was an English professional footballer who made nearly 500 appearances as a goalkeeper in the Football League, most notably for Bradford Park Avenue. After retiring as a player, he served Mansfield Town as a trainer between 1939 and 1949.

== Personal life ==
Clough served in the Royal Army Medical Corps during the First World War. He was awarded the Military Medal for "rendering first aid and bringing in wounded comrades from the front lines under continuous enemy shell fire" during the Battle of the Somme in September 1916. In October 1918, Clough was awarded a bar to his Military Medal for gallantry and devotion to duty in action.

== Career statistics ==
Appearances and goals by club, season and competition
Club	Season	League			FA Cup		Total	
Club	Season	Division	Apps	Goals	Apps	Goals	Apps	Goals
Middlesbrough	1922–23	First Division	12	0	0	0	12	0
Middlesbrough	1923–24	First Division	31	0	1	0	32	0
Middlesbrough	1924–25	Second Division	42	0	1	0	43	0
Middlesbrough	1925–26	Second Division	39	0	2	0	41	0
Middlesbrough	Total		124	0	4	0	128	0
Brentford	1933–34	Second Division	20	0	1	0	21	0
Rotherham United	1934–35	Third Division North	46	0	0	0	46	0
Career total			190	0	5	0	195	0

== Honours ==
Bradford Park Avenue

- Football League Third Division North: 1927–28
