= George Mathison =

English footballer

Personal information
- Full name: George Mathison
- Date of birth: 24 November 1909
- Place of birth: Walker, Newcastle upon Tyne, England
- Date of death: 19 April 1989 (aged 79)
- Height: 5 ft 10 1/2 in (1.79 m)
- Positions: Wing half; centre half

Senior career*
Years	Team	Apps	(Gls)
- Ilkeston United
1926–1933	Newcastle United	20	(0)
1933–1934	Lincoln City	37	(0)
1934–1937	Gateshead	83	(5)
1937–1938	Burnley	0	(0)
1938–19??	Hartlepools United	0	(0)
- * Club domestic league appearances and goals

George Mathison (24 November 1909 – 19 April 1989) was an English footballer who made 140 appearances in the Football League playing for Newcastle United, Lincoln City and Gateshead. He began his career with his local team, Walker Celtic, and was also on the books of Burnley and Hartlepools United without representing either in the league. He did play one competitive match for Hartlepools, in the Third Division North Cup in 1938. He played as a wing half or centre half.
