= Harold Howe =

English footballer (1906–1976)

Personal information
- Full name: Harold George Howe
- Date of birth: 6 October 1906
- Place of birth: Hemel Hempstead, England
- Date of death: 27 April 1976 (aged 69)

Senior career*
Years	Team	Apps	(Gls)
- Apsley
1928–1929	Watford	0	(0)
1929–1933	Queens Park Rangers	69	(13)
1933–1934	Crystal Palace	2	(0)
1934–1935	Rochdale	24	(3)
- Tunbridge Wells Rangers
- * Club domestic league appearances and goals

Harold George Howe (6 October 1906 – 27 April 1976) was an English professional footballer.

Howe was one of Hemel Hempstead's first professional footballers. He started his playing career with Apsley and signed professional forms for Watford at the age of 20. At the height of his career, he played for Queens Park Rangers and later Crystal Palace. After a spell with Rochdale, he finished his playing career with Tunbridge Wells Rangers in the Southern League.

After retiring from football, Howe remained a keen sportsman taking up golf and darts. He became a prominent darts player winning the News of the World individual area championship.
