= Bill Hasson =

Scottish footballer (1905–1979)

Personal information
- Full name: William Craig Hasson
- Date of birth: 12 June 1905
- Place of birth: Glasgow, Scotland
- Date of death: 1979 (aged 83–84)
- Position: Winger

Senior career*
Years	Team	Apps	(Gls)
1925–1926	Shettleston		
1926–1928	Clyde		
1928–1934	Oldham Athletic	134	(22)
1934–1935	Millwall	13	(2)
1935–1936	Chesterfield	2	(0)
Total		149	(24)
- * Club domestic league appearances and goals

William Craig Hasson (12 June 1905 – 1979) was a Scottish footballer who played in the Football League for Chesterfield, Millwall and Oldham Athletic.
