= Garry Hoolickin =

English footballer

Personal information
- Full name: Garry John Hoolickin
- Date of birth: 28 November 1958 (age 67)
- Place of birth: Middleton, England
- Height: 5 ft 11 in (1.80 m)
- Position: Defender

Senior career*
Years	Team	Apps	(Gls)
1976–1987	Oldham Athletic	211	(2)
- * Club domestic league appearances and goals

Garry John Hoolickin (born 29 October 1957) is an English former footballer who played in the Football League for Oldham Athletic.
