= Cliff Eaton =

English footballer (1910–1979)

Clifford Eaton (15 October 1910 – 1979) was an English footballer who played as an inside forward for Portsmouth, Rochdale, and Oldham Athletic. He was the youngest child of Charles Eaton.
