= Bert Hales =

English footballer

Personal information
- Full name: Herbert Hales
- Date of birth: 21 November 1908
- Place of birth: Kettering, England
- Date of death: 1982 (aged 74)
- Position: Outside left

Senior career*
Years	Team	Apps	(Gls)
1927	Desborough Town		
1928–1929	Nottingham Forest	3	(0)
1929	Northampton Town	0	(0)
1929–1930	Peterborough & Fletton United		
1930–1931	Stoke City	1	(0)
1931–1932	Preston North End	57	(10)
1933–1934	Chesterfield	42	(10)
1934–1935	Stockport County	16	(0)
1935–1936	Rochdale	38	(4)
1936	Burton Town		
1937	Kidderminster Harriers		
Total		157	(24)
- * Club domestic league appearances and goals

Herbert Hales (21 November 1908 – 1982) was a footballer who played in the Football League for Nottingham Forest, Preston North End, Chesterfield, Stockport County, Rochdale and Stoke City.

== Career ==
Hales was born in Kettering and began his career with local side Desborough Town. He joined Nottingham Forest in 1928 and played three matches before playing for Northampton Town and Peterborough & Fletton United. In December 1930 he joined Stoke City and played in a 1–1 draw with Bradford City on boxing day. It turned out to be his only senior match for Stoke and he left for Preston North End. After two seasons at Deepdale he had another two at Chesterfield and then one season spells with Stockport County and Rochdale. He finished his career with non-league teams Burton Town and Kidderminster Harriers.

== Career statistics ==
Appearances and goals by club, season and competition
Club	Season	League			FA Cup		Other		Total	
Club	Season	Division	Apps	Goals	Apps	Goals	Apps	Goals	Apps	Goals
Nottingham Forest	1928–29	Second Division	3	0	0	0	—		3	0
Stoke City	1930–31	Second Division	1	0	0	0	—		1	0
Preston North End	1931–32	Second Division	38	5	4	0	—		42	5
Preston North End	1932–33	Second Division	19	5	0	0	—		19	5
Chesterfield	1933–34	Third Division North	33	9	2	0	2	2	37	11
Chesterfield	1934–35	Third Division North	9	1	0	0	0	0	9	1
Stockport County	1934–35	Third Division North	16	0	5	0	1	0	22	0
Rochdale	1935–36	Third Division North	38	4	1	0	1	0	40	4
Career total			157	24	12	0	4	2	173	26
