= John Bollands =

English footballer

Personal information
- Full name: John Frederick Bollands
- Date of birth: 11 July 1935
- Place of birth: Middlesbrough, England
- Date of death: 15 September 2022 (aged 87)
- Position: Goalkeeper

Youth career
- South Bank

Senior career*
Years	Team	Apps	(Gls)
1953–1956	Oldham Athletic	23	(0)
1956–1960	Sunderland	61	(0)
1960–1961	Bolton Wanderers	13	(0)
1961–1966	Oldham Athletic	131	(0)
- * Club domestic league appearances and goals

John Frederick Bollands (11 July 1935 – 15 September 2022) was an English professional footballer who played as a goalkeeper for Sunderland. Bollands died on 15 September 2022 at the age of 87.
