= John Stanger =

English footballer

Personal information
- Full name: John Stanger
- Date of birth: 18 July 1912
- Place of birth: Carlisle, England
- Date of death: 1997 (aged 84–85)
- Height: 5 ft 7 1/2 in (1.71 m)
- Position: Outside right

Senior career*
Years	Team	Apps	(Gls)
–1934	Workington		
1934–1936	Stockport County	14	(2)
1936–1937	Darlington	21	(5)
- * Club domestic league appearances and goals

John Stanger (18 July 1912 – 1997) was an English footballer who played as an outside right in the Football League for Stockport County and Darlington. He also played for North-Eastern League club Workington.

== Life and career ==
John Stanger was born on 18 July 1912 in Carlisle, in what was then Cumberland.

He was a member of the Workington team that in the 1933–34 season won eight games in a row in the North-Eastern League and reached the fourth round of the 1933–34 FA Cup. He scored one of the goals as Workington came back from 3–1 down to beat Manchester North End in the fourth qualifying round replay, scored the only goal of the first round match against Southport, and in the fourth round, against Second Division club Preston North End, he indirectly gave his team the lead when from his corner kick, Preston's goalkeeper, Harry Holdcroft, could only punch the ball into his own net. He moved on to Third Division North club Stockport County, but played infrequently: over two seasons, he scored twice from 14 league matches, and played one FA Cup and two Third Division North Cup matches. He then spent the 1936–37 season with divisional rivals Darlington, playing more regularly, with five goals from 21 league matches.

Stanger died in 1997, aged 84 or 85.
