= Ecclesfield United F.C. =

Ecclesfield United
- Full name: Ecclesfield United Football Club

Ecclesfield United F.C. was an English association football club based in Ecclesfield, South Yorkshire.

== History ==
Little is known of the club other than that it competed in the FA Cup in the 1927–28 season.

=== League and cup history ===
Ecclesfield United League and Cup history
Season	Division	Position	FA Cup
1926–27	Sheffield Association League	/14	-
1927–28	Sheffield Association League	/14	1st qualifying round
1928–29	Sheffield Association League	/15	-

== Records ==
- Best FA Cup performance: 1st qualifying round, 1927–28
