= John Towers (footballer) =

English footballer

Personal information
- Full name: John Towers
- Date of birth: 21 December 1913
- Place of birth: Willington, County Durham, England
- Date of death: 3 January 1979 (aged 65)
- Place of death: Middlesbrough, England
- Height: 5 ft 6 1/2 in (1.69 m)
- Positions: Inside right; wing half

Senior career*
Years	Team	Apps	(Gls)
1931–1934	Willington		
1934–1939	Darlington	94	(22)
- Willington
1945–1947	Darlington	13	(0)
- * Club domestic league appearances and goals

John Towers (21 December 1913 – 3 January 1979) was an English footballer who scored 22 goals from 107 appearances in the Football League playing as an inside right or wing half for Darlington either side of the Second World War. A schoolteacher by profession, he played as an amateur.
