= Arthur Jones (footballer, born 1912) =

Welsh footballer

Personal information
- Full name: Arthur Jones
- Date of birth: 22 August 1912
- Place of birth: Gwersyllt, Wales
- Date of death: 2002 (aged 89–90)
- Height: 5 ft 8 in (1.73 m)
- Position: Winger

Senior career*
Years	Team	Apps	(Gls)
- Cross Street
- Holyhead
1931–1933	Wrexham	7	(0)
1933–1935	Hyde United		
1935–1939	Oldham Athletic	98	(29)
- * Club domestic league appearances and goals

Arthur Jones (22 August 1912 – 2002) was a Welsh professional footballer who played as a winger. He made over 100 appearances in the English Football League in the 1930s for Wrexham and Oldham Athletic.
