= Albert Wood (footballer) =

English association football player

Personal information
- Full name: Albert Wood
- Date of birth: 25 April 1903
- Place of birth: Seaham Harbour, England
- Date of death: 1965 (aged 61–62)
- Height: 5 ft 11 in (1.80 m)
- Position: Inside forward

Senior career*
Years	Team	Apps	(Gls)
1926–1927	Seaham Harbour		
1927–1931	Sunderland	30	(11)
1931–1935	Fulham	22	(9)
1935–1936	Crewe Alexandra	42	(14)
1936–1938	Tranmere Rovers	37	(11)
1938–1939	New Brighton	46	(11)
1939	Hartlepools United	0	(0)
- * Club domestic league appearances and goals

Albert Wood (25 April 1903 – 1965) was an English professional footballer who played as an inside forward for Sunderland.
