= Len Clarke (footballer, born 1908) =

English footballer (1908–1985)

Personal information
- Full name: Leonard Clarke
- Date of birth: 1 September 1908
- Place of birth: Manchester, England
- Date of death: 1985 (aged 76–77)
- Position: Centre-forward

Senior career*
Years	Team	Apps	(Gls)
1929	Fleetwood		
1930	Bacup Borough		
1931	Burnley	0	(0)
1931	Bacup Borough		
1933	Accrington Stanley	0	(0)
1933	Ashton National		
1934	Macclesfield		
1934	Fleetwood		
1934-1936	Rochdale	29	(17)
1936	Folkestone		
1936	Droylsden		
- * Club domestic league appearances and goals

Leonard Clarke (1 September 1908 – 1985) was an English footballer who played as a centre-forward for Rochdale, as well as non league football for several other clubs. He was top goalscorer for Rochdale in the 1934–35 season.
