= Billy Dickinson =

English footballer

Personal information
- Full name: William Dickinson
- Date of birth: 18 February 1906
- Place of birth: Wigan, England
- Date of death: 17 August 1968 (aged 62)
- Height: 5 ft 9 1/2 in (1.77 m)
- Position: Forward

Senior career*
Years	Team	Apps	(Gls)
1924–1928	Wigan Borough	104	(61)
1928–1934	Nottingham Forest	136	(68)
1934–1936	Rotherham United	70	(43)
1936–1938	Southend United	59	(26)
1938–1939	Hull City	18	(5)
Total		387	(203)
- * Club domestic league appearances and goals

William Dickinson (18 February 1906 – 17 August 1968) was an English footballer who played in The Football League for Wigan Borough, Nottingham Forest, Rotherham United, Southend United, and Hull City.
