= Bob Mortimer (footballer) =

English footballer

Personal information
- Full name: Robert Mortimer
- Date of birth: 16 March 1908
- Place of birth: Bolton, England
- Date of death: 1965 (aged 56–57)
- Positions: Striker; outside right; inside left

Senior career*
Years	Team	Apps	(Gls)
- Park Street Wesleyans
1925	Bolton Wanderers	0	(0)
	Connah's Quay & Shotton	?	(?)
	Darwen	?	(?)
1926–1928	Barrow	24	(10)
1928–1931	Bolton Wanderers	0	(0)
1931–1933	Northampton Town	62	(22)
1933–1934	Brentford	0	(0)
1934–1935	Bournemouth & Boscombe Athletic	18	(3)
1935	Accrington Stanley	25	(19)
1935–1936	Portsmouth	0	(0)
1936–1937	Accrington Stanley	45	(37)
1937–1938	Blackburn Rovers	16	(4)
1938–1939	York City	35	(22)
- Bacup Borough
- Horwich RMI
- * Club domestic league appearances and goals

Robert Mortimer (16 March 1908 – 26 June 1965) was an English footballer.

== Career ==
Mortimer joined Barrow in 1926, after playing for non-league clubs Connah's Quay & Shotton and Darwen and a non-playing spell with Bolton Wanderers. After making 24 appearances and scoring 10 goals in the league for Barrow, he rejoined Bolton Wanderers in 1928. He again made no league appearances for Wanderers before joining Northampton Town in 1931. He joined Brentford in 1933 after making 62 appearances and scoring 22 goals in the league for Northampton. He made no league appearances for Brentford, and joined Bournemouth & Boscombe Athletic in 1934. He made 18 appearances and scored three goals in the league for Bournemouth, and joined Accrington Stanley in 1935. He made 25 appearances and scored 19 goals in the league for them, and moved to Portsmouth in the same year. He made no league appearances for the club and re-joined Accrington in 1936. During this spell with the club, he made 45 appearances and scored 39 goals in the league before, until eventually joining Blackburn Rovers in 1937 for a four-figure fee. He made 16 appearances and scored four goals in the league for Blackburn before joining York City in the summer of 1938, which was reportedly their biggest fee. He was York City's top scorer for the 1938–39 season, with 22 goals. He made 36 appearances and scored 22 goals for the club before joining Horwich RMI.
