= Albert Worthy =

English footballer

Personal information
- Full name: Albert Worthy
- Date of birth: 1 November 1905
- Place of birth: Pilsley, England
- Date of death: 1 February 1978 (aged 72)
- Place of death: Lower Pilsley, England
- Height: 5 ft 9 1/2 in (1.77 m)
- Position: Right back

Senior career*
Years	Team	Apps	(Gls)
- Danesmoor
1926–1927	Chesterfield	7	(0)
1927–1933	Lincoln City	198	(5)
1933–1934	Southend United	28	(0)
1934–1937	Rochdale	99	(1)
–	Gainsborough Trinity		
–	Shrewsbury Town		
Total		332	(6)
- * Club domestic league appearances and goals

Albert Worthy (1 November 1905 – 1 February 1978) was an English professional footballer who made 332 appearances in the Football League playing for Chesterfield, Lincoln City, Southend United and Rochdale. He played as a right back.

== Life and career ==
Worthy was born in Pilsley, Derbyshire, and played football for Danesmoor before joining Chesterfield. He played seven league games during the 1926–27 season before moving on to Third Division North rivals Lincoln City. He scored his first Football League goal from a free kick in a 5–0 defeat of Barrow in October 1928. He rarely missed a match in his first five seasons with the club, at the end of which they won the Third Division North title and consequent promotion. Worthy was not a regular first choice in the Second Division, and left the club for Southend United of the Third Division South in the 1933 close season. After one season in which he played 30 games in all competitions, he returned to the Northern Section for three years with Rochdale, after which he played non-league football for Gainsborough Trinity and Shrewsbury Town.

Worthy died in Lower Pilsley, Derbyshire, in 1978 at the age of 72.
