= 1930–31 Brentford F.C. season =

English football team season

Brentford F.C.
1930–31 season
- Chairman: Louis P. Simon
- Manager: Harry Curtis
- Stadium: Griffin Park
- Third Division South: 3rd
- FA Cup: Fourth round
- Top goalscorer: League: W. Lane (27); All: W. Lane (32)
- Highest home attendance: 23,544
- Lowest home attendance: 2,306
- Average home league attendance: 8,236
Home colours

During the 1930–31 English football season, Brentford competed in the Football League Third Division South. Despite failing to challenge for promotion, the Bees finished in 3rd place and advanced to the fourth round of the FA Cup for the first time in four years.

== Season summary ==
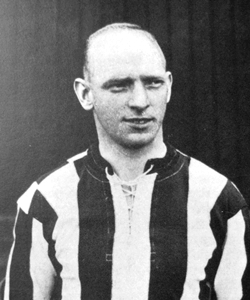
Inside right Jack Lane, one of Brentford's great players of the 1920s and early 1930s, transferred out of the club in January 1931.

Brentford entered the 1930–31 Third Division South season with largely the same personnel which secured a runners-up finish the previous year. The only significant signing was goalkeeper Edward Nash from Swindon Town in September 1930, to cover for Freddie Fox, from whom Nash would take over the goalkeeping position during the second half of the season. The previous season's prolific forward line of Billy Lane, Jack Lane and Cecil Blakemore again showed excellent goalscoring form during the first half of the season, with Bill Berry returning to the fold after a season in the reserve team and replacing the out-of-form John Payne.

Despite the large number of goals, the team's form was patchy, though a run of 8 defeats in 15 league matches between 27 September and 27 December 1930 only dropped the Bees from 5th to 7th position. An 8–2 victory over Crystal Palace on Christmas Day was Brentford's biggest win of the season and equalled the club record for highest aggregate score in a Football League match. The Bees also embarked on a run to the fourth round of the FA Cup, falling to First Division Portsmouth at Griffin Park. Despite the transfer of 19-goal Jack Lane to Crystal Palace in January 1931, Brentford's form improved, with Billy Lane continuing to score and new forward signings George Robson and Les Wilkins making a contribution. 9 wins in the final 31 matches saw the Bees finish the season in 3rd place, 9 points behind champions Notts County.

Brentford's 1930–31 season is notable for the amount of hat-tricks scored, with Billy Lane claiming three, Jack Lane two and Frederick Gamble one, which convinced West Ham United to sign Gamble in exchange for Les Wilkins in February 1931, despite Gamble having made only 13 appearances in just under two years. During the season, Billy Lane and Jack Lane each scored a hat-trick in the same match twice during a one-month period – in the 6–1 FA Cup first round victory over Ilford on 29 November 1930 and in the 8–2 league victory over Crystal Palace on Christmas Day. Jack Lane's only goal of the game versus Norwich City in the FA Cup second round on 13 December 1930 marked the first time in the club's Football League history that three players had reached 10 goals for the season prior to Christmas Day. The other goalscorers then on double figures were Billy Lane and Cecil Blakemore.

== League table ==
Pos	Team	Pld	W	D	L	GF	GA	GAv	Pts	Promotion or relegation
1	Notts County (C, P)	42	24	11	7	97	46	2.109	59	Promotion to the Second Division
2	Crystal Palace	42	22	7	13	107	71	1.507	51	
3	Brentford	42	22	6	14	90	64	1.406	50	
4	Brighton & Hove Albion	42	17	15	10	68	53	1.283	49	
5	Southend United	42	22	5	15	76	60	1.267	49	

(C) Division Champions; (P) Promoted

== Results ==
Brentford's goal tally listed first.

=== Legend ===
Win	Draw	Loss

=== Football League Third Division South ===
No.	Date	Opponent	Venue	Result	Attendance	Scorer(s)	Notes
1	30 August 1930	Luton Town	A	1–1	11,686	Foster	
2	3 September 1930	Northampton Town	H	0–4	11,356		
3	6 September 1930	Bristol Rovers	H	4–0	9,919	Blakemore (2), W. Lane (2)	
4	8 September 1930	Fulham	A	1–1	12,248	W. Lane	
5	13 September 1930	Newport County	A	2–0	2,758	W. Lane	
6	17 September 1930	Fulham	H	4–1	9,564	W. Lane (2), J. Lane, Payne	
7	20 September 1930	Gillingham	H	1–1	9,407	Payne	
8	24 September 1930	Notts County	H	2–2	9,999	Blakemore (pen), W. Lane	
9	27 September 1930	Exeter City	A	0–4	5,352		
10	4 October 1930	Brighton & Hove Albion	H	3–2	9,348	W. Lane, Blakemore, J. Lane	
11	11 October 1930	Torquay United	A	3–0	6,944	J. Lane, Hill (og), W. Lane	
12	18 October 1930	Coventry City	H	1–2	10,244	W. Lane	
13	25 October 1930	Walsall	A	4–1	2,943	J. Lane, W. Lane, Berry	
14	1 November 1930	Queens Park Rangers	H	5–3	10,857	Berry (2), J. Lane, Blakemore (2, 1 pen)	
15	8 November 1930	Norwich City	A	0–3	9,172		
16	15 November 1930	Thames	H	6–1	7,211	Berry (2), J. Lane, Blakemore (2), W. Lane (2)	
17	22 November 1930	Clapton Orient	N	0–3	8,319		(Note: Match played at Wembley Stadium, London due to Clapton Orient's Lea Bridge Stadium being temporarily closed due it failing to satisfy Football League requirements. This is the only occasion on which Brentford have played a league match on neutral territory.)
18	6 December 1930	Watford	A	3–1	6,775	W. Lane, Berry, Blakemore (pen)	
19	18 December 1930	Bournemouth & Boscombe Athletic	H	1–2	2,306	J. Lane	
20	20 December 1930	Swindon Town	A	2–3	4,728	Blakemore, J. Lane	
21	25 December 1930	Crystal Palace	H	8–2	11,770	J. Lane (3), Berry (2), W. Lane (3)	
22	26 December 1930	Crystal Palace	A	1–5	15,853	W. Lane	
23	27 December 1930	Luton Town	H	0–1	7,353		
24	3 January 1931	Bristol Rovers	A	5–2	7,449	W. Lane (3), Berry (2)	
25	17 January 1931	Newport County	H	3–2	7,170	J. Lane, Berry, W. Lane	
26	28 January 1931	Gillingham	A	1–1	2,547	J. Lane	
27	31 January 1931	Exeter City	H	2–1	7,575	Gamble, Berry	
28	7 February 1931	Brighton & Hove Albion	A	0–1	9,451		
29	14 February 1931	Torquay United	H	0–0	6,464		
30	21 February 1931	Coventry City	A	1–0	9,651	Blakemore	
31	28 February 1931	Walsall	H	6–1	7,117	Berry (2), Gamble (3), John (og)	
32	7 March 1931	Queens Park Rangers	A	1–3	10,331	Sherlaw	
33	14 March 1931	Norwich City	H	3–1	9,013	Hannah (og), Robson, Wilkins	
34	21 March 1931	Thames	A	0–2	3,675		
35	28 March 1931	Clapton Orient	H	3–0	7,757	W. Lane, Robson, Berry	
36	3 April 1931	Southend United	H	3–1	6,027	W. Lane, Blakemore, Robson	
37	4 April 1931	Notts County	A	0–1	14,759		
38	6 April 1931	Southend United	A	1–0	9,969	Berry	
39	11 April 1931	Watford	H	2–1	8,163	W. Lane, Blakemore (pen)	
40	18 April 1931	Bournemouth & Boscombe Athletic	A	0–1	3,662		
41	25 April 1931	Swindon Town	H	5–2	4,327	Berry (2), W. Lane, Robson	
42	2 May 1931	Northampton Town	A	2–1	3,698	Sherlaw, Berry	

=== FA Cup ===
Round	Date	Opponent	Venue	Result	Attendance	Scorer(s)
1R	29 November 1930	Ilford	A	6–1	5,718	W. Lane (3), J. Lane (3)
2R	13 December 1930	Norwich City	H	1–0	12,000	J. Lane
3R	10 January 1931	Cardiff City	H	2–2	16,500	Berry, W. Lane
3R (replay)	14 January 1931	Cardiff City	A	2–1	25,000	W. Lane, J. Lane
4R	24 January 1931	Portsmouth	H	0–1	23,544	

- Sources: Statto, 11v11, 100 Years of Brentford

== Playing squad ==
Players' ages are as of the opening day of the 1930–31 season.

Pos.	Name	Nat.	Date of birth (age)	Signed from	Signed in	Notes
Goalkeepers
GK	Freddie Fox	(England)	22 November 1898 (aged 31)	Halifax Town	1928	
GK	Frank McDonough	(England)	24 December 1899 (aged 30)	Annfield Plain	1930	
GK	Edward Nash	(England)	12 April 1902 (aged 28)	Swindon Town	1930	
Defenders
DF	Tom Adamson	(Scotland)	12 February 1901 (aged 29)	Bury	1929	
DF	Bill Bann	(Scotland)	15 August 1902 (aged 28)	Tottenham Hotspur	1930	
DF	William Hodge	(Scotland)	31 August 1904 (aged 25)	Rangers	1927	
DF	Alexander Stevenson	(Scotland)	24 October 1903 (aged 26)	Armadale	1927	
Midfielders
HB	Jimmy Bain	(Scotland)	6 February 1899 (aged 31)	Manchester Central	1928	
HB	Reginald Davies (c)	(England)	30 September 1897 (aged 32)	Portsmouth	1928	
HB	Harry Salt	(England)	20 January 1899 (aged 31)	Crystal Palace	1929	
HB	Teddy Ware	(England)	17 September 1906 (aged 23)	Chatham Town	1928	
Forwards
FW	Ralph Allen	(England)	30 June 1906 (aged 24)	Fulham	1930	
FW	Bill Berry	(England)	18 August 1904 (aged 26)	Gillingham	1926	
FW	Cecil Blakemore	(England)	8 December 1897 (aged 32)	Bristol City	1929	
FW	Jackie Foster	(England)	21 March 1903 (aged 27)	Bristol City	1929	
FW	Billy Lane	(England)	23 October 1904 (aged 25)	Reading	1929	
FW	Herbert Lawson	(England)	12 April 1905 (aged 25)	Arsenal	1927	
FW	George Robson	(England)	17 June 1908 (aged 22)	West Ham United	1931	
FW	James Shaw	(England)	8 August 1904 (aged 26)	Arsenal	1930	
FW	David Sherlaw	(Scotland)	17 September 1901 (aged 28)	Charlton Athletic	1928	
FW	Norman Thomson	(Scotland)	20 February 1901 (aged 29)	Norwich City	1930	
FW	Les Wilkins	(Wales)	21 January 1907 (aged 23)	West Ham United	1931	
Players who left the club mid-season
FW	Frederick Gamble	(England)	29 May 1905 (aged 25)	Southall	1928	Transferred to West Ham United
FW	Jack Lane	(England)	29 May 1898 (aged 32)	Chesterfield	1925	Transferred to Crystal Palace
FW	John Payne	(England)	3 January 1906 (aged 24)	West Ham United	1929	Transferred to Manchester City
FW	Les Roberts	(England)	28 February 1901 (aged 29)	Swindon Town	1930	Transferred to Manchester City

- Sources: 100 Years of Brentford, Timeless Bees, Football League Players' Records 1888 to 1939

== Coaching staff ==
Name	Role
(England) Harry Curtis	Manager
(England) Bob Kane	Trainer
(England) Jack Cartmell	Assistant trainer

== Statistics ==
=== Appearances and goals ===

Brentford's highest appearance-makers in each position during the Football League season.

Pos	Nat	Name	League		FA Cup		Total	
Pos	Nat	Name	Apps	Goals	Apps	Goals	Apps	Goals
GK	(England)	Freddie Fox	19	0	2	0	21	0
GK	(England)	Frank McDonough	2	0	0	0	2	0
GK	(England)	Edward Nash	21	0	3	0	24	0
DF	(Scotland)	Tom Adamson	36	0	5	0	41	0
DF	(Scotland)	Bill Bann	3	0	0	0	3	0
DF	(Scotland)	William Hodge	19	0	0	0	19	0
DF	(Scotland)	Alexander Stevenson	26	0	5	0	31	0
HB	(Scotland)	Jimmy Bain	42	0	5	0	47	0
HB	(England)	Reginald Davies	38	0	4	0	42	0
HB	(England)	Harry Salt	25	0	5	0	30	0
HB	(England)	Teddy Ware	17	0	0	0	17	0
FW	(England)	Ralph Allen	2	0	—		2	0
FW	(England)	Bill Berry	32	18	5	1	37	19
FW	(England)	Cecil Blakemore	35	13	5	0	40	13
FW	(England)	Jackie Foster	39	1	5	0	44	1
FW	(England)	Frederick Gamble	6	4	0	0	6	4
FW	(England)	Billy Lane	33	27	5	5	38	32
FW	(England)	Jack Lane	25	14	5	5	30	19
FW	(England)	Herbert Lawson	4	0	1	0	5	0
FW	(England)	John Payne	10	2	0	0	10	2
FW	(England)	Les Roberts	5	0	0	0	5	0
FW	(England)	George Robson	13	5	—		13	5
FW	(England)	James Shaw	1	0	0	0	1	0
FW	(Scotland)	David Sherlaw	6	2	0	0	6	2
FW	(Scotland)	Norman Thomson	1	0	0	0	1	0
FW	(Wales)	Les Wilkins	2	1	—		2	1

- Players listed in italics left the club mid-season.
- Source: 100 Years of Brentford

=== Goalscorers ===
Pos.	Nat	Player	FL3	FAC	Total
FW	(England)	Billy Lane	27	5	32
FW	(England)	Bill Berry	18	1	19
FW	(England)	Jack Lane	14	5	19
FW	(England)	Cecil Blakemore	13	0	13
FW	(England)	George Robson	5	—	5
FW	(England)	Frederick Gamble	4	0	4
FW	(England)	John Payne	2	0	2
FW	(Scotland)	David Sherlaw	2	0	2
FW	(Wales)	Les Wilkins	1	—	1
FW	(England)	Jackie Foster	1	0	1
Opponents			3	0	3
Total			90	11	101

- Players listed in italics left the club mid-season.
- Source: 100 Years of Brentford

=== Management ===
Name	Nat	From	To	Record All Comps					Record League				
Name	Nat	From	To	P	W	D	L	W %	P	W	D	L	W %
Harry Curtis	(England)	30 August 1930	2 May 1931	47	25	7	15	53.19|	42	22	6	14	52.38

=== Summary ===
Games played	47 (42 Third Division South, 5 FA Cup)
Games won	25 (22 Third Division South, 3 FA Cup)
Games drawn	7 (6 Third Division South, 1 FA Cup)
Games lost	15 (14 Third Division South, 1 FA Cup)
Goals scored	101 (90 Third Division South, 11 FA Cup)
Goals conceded	69 (64 Third Division South, 5 FA Cup)
Clean sheets	8 (7 Third Division South, 1 FA Cup)
Biggest league win	8–2 versus Crystal Palace, 25 December 1930
Worst league defeat	4–0 on two occasions
Most appearances	47, Jimmy Bain (42 Third Division South, 5 FA Cup)
Top scorer (league)	27, Billy Lane
Top scorer (all competitions)	32, Billy Lane

== Transfers & loans ==
Cricketers are not included in this list.

Players transferred in
Date	Pos.	Name	Previous club	Fee	Ref.
May 1930	FW	(England) James Shaw	(England) Arsenal	Free	
2 June 1930	FW	(England) Les Roberts	(England) Swindon Town	Free	
3 June 1930	DF	(Scotland) Bill Bann	(England) Tottenham Hotspur	Free	
August 1930	FW	(Scotland) Norman Thomson	(England) Norwich City	Nominal	
19 September 1930	GK	(England) Edward Nash	(England) Swindon Town	n/a	
February 1931	FW	(England) George Robson	(England) West Ham United	n/a	
February 1931	FW	(England) Bert Stephens	(England) Ealing Association	Free	
February 1931	FW	(Wales) Les Wilkins	(England) West Ham United	Exchange	
March 1931	FW	(England) Ralph Allen	(England) Fulham	Free	
Players transferred out
Date	Pos.	Name	Subsequent club	Fee	Ref.
May 1930	DF	(England) George Dumbrell	(England) Leicester City	£1,750	
29 January 1931	FW	(England) Jack Lane	(England) Crystal Palace	n/a	
January 1931	FW	(England) John Payne	(England) Manchester City	n/a	
January 1931	FW	(England) Les Roberts	(England) Manchester City	n/a	
February 1931	FW	(England) Frederick Gamble	(England) West Ham United	Exchange	
Players released
Date	Pos.	Name	Subsequent club	Join date	Ref.
May 1931	GK	(England) Freddie Fox	(England) Truro City	n/a	
May 1931	GK	(England) Frank McDonough	(England) Thames	May 1931	
May 1931	FW	(England) James Shaw	(England) Gillingham	May 1931	
May 1931	HB	(Wales) Martin Woosnam	(England) Thames	May 1931	
