= 1931–32 Brentford F.C. season =

English football team season

Brentford
1931–32 season
- Chairman: Louis P. Simon
- Manager: Harry Curtis
- Stadium: Griffin Park
- Third Division South: 5th
- FA Cup: Fourth round
- Top goalscorer: League: Lane (22); All: Lane (27)
- Highest home attendance: 26,139
- Lowest home attendance: 4,902
- Average home league attendance: 11,347
Home colours

During the 1931–32 English football season, Brentford competed in the Football League Third Division South. Despite leading the division for two months in mid-season, the Bees fell away and finished 5th.

== Season summary ==
Brentford manager Harry Curtis' additions to his squad for the 1931–32 Third Division South season were minor – backup goalkeeper Dave Smith, amateur half back Jackie Gibbons and forwards George Cook, George Robson and Bert Stephens. The team had a very strong first half of the season, rising to the top of the table by 5 December 1931 and staying there until 13 February 1932, when a run of just five defeats in 31 matches in all competitions came to an end. Billy Lane kept up his prolific goalscoring form from the previous two seasons, scoring 20 goals in a 27 match spell, with Jackie Foster, Bill Berry and Jackie Gibbons also supporting with regular goals.

As in the previous two seasons, Brentford's suffered a slump in the second half of the campaign, losing 9 of 14 matches between mid-February and late April to drop to as low as 9th, though two wins from the final two matches of the season elevated the side to a 5th-place finish. Brentford had also reached the fourth round of the FA Cup for the second successive season, exiting the competition after a heavy 6–1 defeat at the hands of top-flight Manchester City at Maine Road. It had been rumoured in April 1932 that manager Curtis had tendered his resignation, but chairman Louis P. Simon recognised his good work over the previous six years and persuaded him to stay. A run of four successive home Football League draws during the season equalled the club record, while Billy Lane's seventh and final Brentford hattrick (scored versus Coventry City on 12 September 1931) set a new club record.

=== Reserve team ===
Brentford's reserve team finished as champions of the London Combination for the first time. The team went undefeated at home from 21 November 1931, setting off a run which extended until 4 November 1933. Ralph Allen captained the team and scored a large percentage of the goals.

== League table ==
Pos	Team	Pld	W	D	L	GF	GA	GAv	Pts
3	Southend United	42	21	11	10	77	53	1.453	53
4	Crystal Palace	42	20	11	11	74	63	1.175	51
5	Brentford	42	19	10	13	68	52	1.308	48
6	Luton Town	42	20	7	15	95	70	1.357	47
7	Exeter City	42	20	7	15	77	62	1.242	47

== Results ==
Brentford's goal tally listed first.

=== Legend ===
Win	Draw	Loss

=== Football League Third Division South ===
No.	Date	Opponent	Venue	Result	Attendance	Scorer(s)
1	29 August 1931	Queens Park Rangers	H	1–0	20,739	Robson
2	3 September 1931	Thames	A	1–1	4,217	Cook
3	5 September 1931	Exeter City	A	1–4	7,093	Lane
4	9 September 1931	Reading	A	2–1	9,155	Lane, Foster
5	12 September 1931	Coventry City	H	4–2	8,017	Lane (3), Foster
6	19 September 1931	Gillingham	A	2–1	7,225	Lane, Foster
7	24 September 1931	Reading	H	3–0	8,942	Lane (2), Foster
8	26 September 1931	Luton Town	H	1–0	12,540	Burns
9	3 October 1931	Cardiff City	A	2–3	9,521	Burns, Lane
10	10 October 1931	Northampton Town	H	2–0	12,694	Lane (pen), Robson
11	17 October 1931	Bristol Rovers	H	4–2	11,338	Burns, Robson (2 pens), Berry
12	24 October 1931	Torquay United	A	1–1	4,650	Robson (pen)
13	31 October 1931	Clapton Orient	H	3–0	11,295	Berry (2), Burns
14	7 November 1931	Swindon Town	A	3–1	6,415	Lane, Foster (2)
15	14 November 1931	Norwich City	H	0–1	11,484	
16	21 November 1931	Brighton & Hove Albion	A	2–1	9,582	Lane, Berry
17	5 December 1931	Watford	A	4–1	12,086	Robson, Foster, Lane (2)
18	19 December 1931	Bournemouth & Boscombe Athletic	A	3–1	5,000	Lane, Foster, Burns
19	25 December 1931	Fulham	H	0–0	26,139	
20	26 December 1931	Fulham	A	1–2	29,253	Robson
21	2 January 1932	Queens Park Rangers	A	2–1	33,553	Lane (2)
22	13 January 1932	Mansfield Town	H	1–1	4,902	Lane
23	16 January 1932	Exeter City	H	2–2	11,981	Lane, Foster
24	28 January 1932	Coventry City	A	1–0	6,172	Berry
25	30 January 1932	Gillingham	H	1–1	11,361	Berry
26	6 February 1932	Luton Town	A	1–1	7,402	Lane
27	13 February 1932	Cardiff City	H	2–3	16,239	Crompton, Gibbins
28	20 February 1932	Northampton Town	A	0–3	6,533	
29	27 February 1932	Bristol Rovers	A	0–2	6,114	
30	5 March 1932	Torquay United	H	3–2	11,293	Webster (og), Burns, Gibbins
31	12 March 1932	Clapton Orient	A	2–2	10,700	Crompton, Foster
32	19 March 1932	Swindon Town	H	2–0	10,179	Robson (pen), Foster
33	25 March 1932	Southend United	H	2–3	15,237	Crompton, Gibbins
34	26 March 1932	Norwich City	A	0–1	10,422	
35	28 March 1932	Southend United	A	0–1	17,313	
36	2 April 1932	Brighton & Hove Albion	H	2–2	9,107	Gibbins (2)
37	9 April 1932	Mansfield Town	A	0–2	4,932	
38	13 April 1932	Crystal Palace	H	1–1	5,816	Lane
39	16 April 1932	Watford	H	1–2	6,723	Burns
40	23 April 1932	Crystal Palace	A	0–1	12,138	
41	30 April 1932	Bournemouth & Boscombe Athletic	H	4–2	5,906	Foster (2), Cook, Lane
42	7 May 1932	Thames	H	1–0	6,364	Robson

=== FA Cup ===
Round	Date	Opponent	Venue	Result	Attendance	Scorer(s)
1R	28 November 1931	Tunbridge Wells Rangers	A	1–1	5,680	Burns
1R (replay)	2 December 1931	Tunbridge Wells Rangers	H	2–1	10,000	Lane (pen), Burns
2R	12 December 1931	Norwich City	H	4–1	17,050	Lane (2), Robson, Berry
3R	9 January 1932	Bath City	H	2–0	15,700	Lane, Berry
4R	23 January 1932	Manchester City	A	1–6	56,190	Lane

- Sources: Statto, 11v11, 100 Years of Brentford

== Playing squad ==
Players' ages are as of the opening day of the 1931–32 season.

Pos.	Name	Nat.	Date of birth (age)	Signed from	Signed in	Notes
Goalkeepers
GK	Edward Nash	(England)	12 April 1902 (aged 29)	Swindon Town	1930	
GK	Dave Smith	(Scotland)	6 July 1903 (aged 28)	Gillingham	1931	
Defenders
DF	Tom Adamson	(Scotland)	12 February 1901 (aged 30)	Bury	1929	
DF	Bill Bann	(Scotland)	15 August 1902 (aged 29)	Tottenham Hotspur	1930	
DF	William Hodge	(Scotland)	31 August 1904 (aged 26)	Rangers	1927	
DF	Alexander Stevenson	(Scotland)	24 October 1903 (aged 27)	Armadale	1927	
DF	George Weeks	(England)	5 August 1902 (aged 29)	Southall	1929	
Midfielders
HB	Jimmy Bain (c)	(Scotland)	6 February 1899 (aged 32)	Manchester Central	1928	
HB	Joe James	(England)	13 January 1910 (aged 21)	Battersea Church	1929	
HB	Harry Salt	(England)	20 January 1899 (aged 32)	Crystal Palace	1929	
HB	Teddy Ware	(England)	17 September 1906 (aged 24)	Chatham Town	1928	
HB	Les Wilkins	(Wales)	21 January 1907 (aged 24)	West Ham United	1931	
Forwards
FW	Ralph Allen	(England)	30 June 1906 (aged 25)	Fulham	1930	
FW	Bill Berry	(England)	18 August 1904 (aged 27)	Gillingham	1926	
FW	Jackie Burns	(England)	27 November 1906 (aged 24)	Queens Park Rangers	1931	Amateur
FW	George Cook	(England)	27 February 1895 (aged 36)	Tottenham Hotspur	1931	
FW	Arthur Crompton	(England)	9 January 1903 (aged 28)	Southend United	1932	
FW	Jackie Foster	(England)	21 March 1903 (aged 28)	Bristol City	1929	
FW	Vivian Gibbins	(England)	10 August 1901 (aged 30)	Clapton	1932	Amateur
FW	Billy Lane	(England)	23 October 1904 (aged 26)	Reading	1929	
FW	Herbert Lawson	(England)	12 April 1905 (aged 26)	Arsenal	1927	
FW	George Robson	(England)	17 June 1908 (aged 23)	West Ham United	1931	
FW	Bert Stephens	(England)	13 May 1909 (aged 22)	Ealing Association	1931	

- Sources: 100 Years of Brentford, Timeless Bees, Football League Players' Records 1888 to 1939

== Coaching staff ==
Name	Role
(England) Harry Curtis	Manager
(England) Bob Kane	Trainer
(England) Jack Cartmell	Assistant trainer

== Statistics ==
=== Appearances and goals ===

Brentford's highest appearance-makers in each position during the Football League season.

Pos	Nat	Name	League		FA Cup		Total	
Pos	Nat	Name	Apps	Goals	Apps	Goals	Apps	Goals
GK	(England)	Edward Nash	35	0	5	0	40	0
GK	(Scotland)	Dave Smith	7	0	0	0	7	0
DF	(Scotland)	Tom Adamson	35	0	5	0	40	0
DF	(Scotland)	Bill Bann	4	0	0	0	4	0
DF	(Scotland)	William Hodge	29	0	3	0	32	0
DF	(Scotland)	Alexander Stevenson	14	0	2	0	16	0
DF	(England)	George Weeks	2	0	0	0	2	0
HB	(Scotland)	Jimmy Bain	37	0	3	0	40	0
HB	(England)	Joe James	5	0	2	0	7	0
HB	(England)	Harry Salt	13	0	0	0	13	0
HB	(England)	Teddy Ware	41	0	5	0	46	0
HB	(Wales)	Les Wilkins	17	0	4	0	21	0
FW	(England)	Ralph Allen	2	0	0	0	2	0
FW	(England)	Bill Berry	31	6	5	2	36	8
FW	(England)	Jackie Burns	36	7	5	2	41	7
FW	(England)	George Cook	14	3	1	0	15	3
FW	(England)	Arthur Crompton	12	3	—		12	3
FW	(England)	Jackie Foster	40	12	5	0	45	12
FW	(England)	Vivian Gibbins	8	5	—		8	5
FW	(England)	Billy Lane	37	22	5	5	42	27
FW	(England)	Herbert Lawson	3	0	0	0	3	0
FW	(England)	George Robson	38	9	5	1	43	10
FW	(England)	Bert Stephens	2	0	0	0	2	0

- Players listed in italics left the club mid-season.
- Source: 100 Years of Brentford

=== Goalscorers ===
Pos.	Nat	Player	FL3	FAC	Total
FW	(England)	Billy Lane	22	5	27
FW	(England)	Jackie Foster	12	0	12
FW	(England)	George Robson	9	1	10
FW	(England)	Bill Berry	6	2	8
FW	(England)	Jackie Burns	7	2	5
FW	(England)	Vivian Gibbins	5	—	5
FW	(England)	Arthur Crompton	3	—	3
FW	(England)	George Cook	3	0	3
Opponents			1	0	1
Total			68	10	78

- Players listed in italics left the club mid-season.
- Source: 100 Years of Brentford

=== Amateur international caps ===
Pos.	Nat	Player	Caps	Goals	Ref
FW	(England)	Jackie Burns	3	0	
FW	(England)	Vivian Gibbins	2	0	

=== Management ===
Name	Nat	From	To	Record All Comps					Record League				
Name	Nat	From	To	P	W	D	L	W %	P	W	D	L	W %
Harry Curtis	(England)	9 August 1931	7 May 1932	47	22	11	14	46.81|	42	19	10	13	45.24

=== Summary ===
Games played	47 (42 Third Division South, 5 FA Cup)
Games won	22 (19 Third Division South, 3 FA Cup)
Games drawn	11 (10 Third Division South, 1 FA Cup)
Games lost	14 (13 Third Division South, 1 FA Cup)
Goals scored	78 (68 Third Division South, 10 FA Cup)
Goals conceded	61 (52 Third Division South, 9 FA Cup)
Clean sheets	10 (9 Third Division South, 1 FA Cup)
Biggest league win	3–0 on two occasions; 4–1 versus Watford, 5 December 1931
Worst league defeat	3–0 versus Northampton Town, 20 February 1932; 4–1 versus Exeter City, 5 September 1931
Most appearances	46, Teddy Ware (41 Third Division South, 5 FA Cup)
Top scorer (league)	22, Billy Lane
Top scorer (all competitions)	27, Billy Lane

== Transfers & loans ==
Cricketers are not included in this list.

Players transferred in
Date	Pos.	Name	Previous club	Fee	Ref.
May 1931	FW	(England) Andy Anderson	(England) Blyth Spartans	n/a	
May 1931	FW	(England) Jackie Burns	(England) Queens Park Rangers	Amateur	
May 1931	FW	(Scotland) Malcolm Comrie	(Scotland) Denny Hibernians	n/a	
May 1931	FW	(Scotland) Johnny McPhee	(England) Sunderland	n/a	
May 1931	GK	(Scotland) Dave Smith	(England) Gillingham	Free	
August 1931	FW	(England) George Cook	(England) Tottenham Hotspur	n/a	
August 1931	FW	S. Fieldus	(England) Millwall	n/a	
August 1931	HB	(England) Cecil Smith	(England) Brentford Market	Free	
1931	LH	(England) Albert Woods	(England) Gillingham	n/a	
11 February 1932	FW	(England) Vivian Gibbins	(England) Clapton	Amateur	
February 1932	FW	(England) Arthur Crompton	(England) Southend United	n/a	
Players transferred out
Date	Pos.	Name	Subsequent club	Fee	Ref.
August 1931	FW	(England) Cecil Blakemore	(England) Norwich City	£200	
Players released
Date	Pos.	Name	Subsequent club	Join date	Ref.
May 1932	FW	(England) Andy Anderson	n/a	n/a	
May 1932	DF	(Scotland) Bill Bann	(England) Bristol Rovers	4 June 1932	
May 1932	FW	(Scotland) Malcolm Comrie	(England) Manchester City	July 1932	
May 1932	FW	(England) George Cook	(Wales) Colwyn Bay United	1932	
May 1932	HB	(England) Reginald Davies	(England) Mansfield Town	1932	
May 1932	FW	(England) Vivian Gibbins	(England) Bristol Rovers	9 June 1932	
May 1932	GK	(England) Edward Nash	(England) Crystal Palace	August 1932	
May 1932	HB	(England) Harry Salt	(England) Walsall	May 1932	
May 1932	FW	(Scotland) David Sherlaw	(Scotland) St Johnstone	6 July 1932	
May 1932	GK	(Scotland) Dave Smith	(Scotland) Nithsdale Wanderers	1932	
May 1932	DF	(England) George Weeks	(England) Watford	July 1932	
May 1932	FW	(Wales) Les Wilkins	(England) Swindon Town	25 August 1932	
