= 1929–30 Brentford F.C. season =

English football team season

Brentford F.C.
1929–30 season
- Chairman: Louis P. Simon
- Manager: Harry Curtis
- Stadium: Griffin Park
- Third Division South: 2nd
- FA Cup: First round
- London Challenge Cup: Runners-up
- Top goalscorer: League: W. Lane (33); All: W. Lane (33)
- Highest home attendance: 21,966
- Lowest home attendance: 5,041
- Average home league attendance: 12,123
Home colours

During the 1929–30 English football season, Brentford competed in the Football League Third Division South. Brentford finished as runners-up, the club's highest finish in the pyramid at that time and statistically it is the club's best-ever season. Brentford became the fifth club to win all their home Football League matches in a season and as of the end of the 2015–16 season, the Bees' total of 21 home victories from 21 matches has never been bettered. Billy Lane set a new club record of 33 goals in all competitions, which would stand for three years and the club also reached the final of the London Challenge Cup for the first time.

== Season summary ==
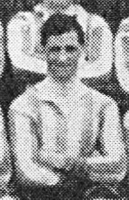
Right half Reginald Davies was named as captain for the 1929–30 season.

Brentford manager Harry Curtis tinkered with his squad in the 1929 off-season, releasing half backs Jack Beacham, Stephen Dearn and a number of young forwards who failed to make the grade during the previous season. In came full back Tom Adamson, half backs Reginald Davies (the new captain), Harry Salt and forwards Cecil Blakemore, Jackie Foster, Billy Lane and John Payne. Brentford went on to have their best season at that time in the Football League, ending 1929 in second place and ascending to the top of the Third Division South on 25 January 1930. The good results were due to a consistently fit starting XI, which went unchanged for 21 consecutive matches in all competitions between 2 November 1929 and 15 March 1930, a club record. Top spot was held onto until a 0–0 draw with Exeter City on 29 March saw Plymouth Argyle overtake the Bees and automatic promotion was effectively conceded after successive defeats in mid-April. Brentford finished as runners-up and would remain in the Third Division South for 1930–31. The Bees finished the season with four players scoring 15 goals or more – Billy Lane (33), Jack Lane (19), John Payne (16) and Cecil Blakemore (15).

Brentford became the fifth club to win all their home league matches in a season and as of the end of the 2015–16 season, the club's achievement of 21 wins from 21 matches is still a national record. Billy Lane's 33 goals smashed Brentford's record for goals scored in a season, which stood until surpassed by Jack Holliday in 1933. A club record was also set for most league victories in a season (28, which would not be equalled until the Bees' promotion from League One in 2013–14), most home league goals scored in a season (66) and owing to the 100% winning home record, fewest home league draws and defeats (0). The 6–0 victory over Merthyr Town on 14 September 1929 set a new club record for highest winning margin in a Football League match, while the 5–1 victory over West London rivals Fulham on 22 February 1930 attracted a 21,966 crowd to Griffin Park, then a club record for a home match. Brentford also reached the final of the London Challenge Cup for the first time, but lost 2–1 to West Ham United. In 2013, 1929–30 was voted by the Brentford supporters as the club's fourth-best season.

In recognition of the club's unbeaten home record, at the club's annual meeting in July 1930, chairman Louis P. Simon presented a silver shield, on which were inscribed the names of the principle XI which achieved the feat – Fox, Stevenson, Adamson, Davies, Bain, Salt, Foster, J. Lane, W. Lane, Blackmore and Payne.

== League table ==
Pos	Team	Pld	W	D	L	GF	GA	GAv	Pts	Promotion or relegation
1	Plymouth Argyle (C, P)	42	30	8	4	98	38	2.579	68	Promotion to the Second Division
2	Brentford	42	28	5	9	94	44	2.136	61	
3	Queens Park Rangers	42	21	9	12	80	68	1.176	51	
4	Northampton Town	42	21	8	13	82	58	1.414	50	
5	Brighton & Hove Albion	42	21	8	13	87	63	1.381	50	

(C) Champions; (P) Promoted

== Results ==
Brentford's goal tally listed first.

=== Legend ===
Win	Draw	Loss

=== Football League Third Division South ===
No.	Date	Opponent	Venue	Result	Attendance	Scorer(s)
1	31 August 1929	Swindon Town	H	3–2	11,084	Blakemore, Payne (2)
2	4 September 1929	Clapton Orient	H	3–1	9,346	Blakemore, Galbraith (og), W. Lane
3	7 September 1929	Plymouth Argyle	A	1–1	12,161	W. Lane
4	14 September 1929	Merthyr Town	H	6–0	11,040	Whipp, W. Lane (4), Blakemore
5	16 September 1929	Clapton Orient	A	1–1	6,854	Payne
6	21 September 1929	Torquay United	A	1–2	5,012	W. Lane
7	25 September 1929	Bristol Rovers	H	2–1	6,265	Foster, W. Lane
8	28 September 1929	Newport County	H	1–0	11,073	Payne
9	5 October 1929	Watford	A	2–1	10,814	Payne, Bain
10	12 October 1929	Coventry City	H	3–1	11,957	Blakemore, J. Lane, Bain
11	19 October 1929	Fulham	A	0–2	25,891	
12	26 October 1929	Norwich City	H	3–0	11,052	W. Lane (2), Blakemore
13	2 November 1929	Crystal Palace	A	1–2	16,939	J. Lane
14	9 November 1929	Gillingham	H	2–1	9,603	W. Lane (2)
15	16 November 1929	Northampton Town	A	1–1	6,165	Foster
16	23 November 1929	Exeter City	H	2–1	6,502	Blakemore, J. Lane
17	7 December 1929	Luton Town	H	2–0	7,167	J. Lane (2)
18	21 December 1929	Walsall	H	6–2	5,041	Payne (2), W. Lane (2), J. Lane, Blakemore (pen)
19	25 December 1929	Brighton & Hove Albion	H	5–2	14,612	J. Lane (2), Payne, W. Lane, Blakemore
20	26 December 1929	Brighton & Hove Albion	A	0–2	19,193	
21	28 December 1929	Swindon Town	A	2–0	4,317	Blakemore (2)
22	4 January 1930	Plymouth Argyle	H	3–0	20,511	Foster, J. Lane
23	11 January 1930	Southend United	A	0–2	6,456	
24	18 January 1930	Merthyr Town	A	3–2	2,103	Blakemore, J. Lane (2)
25	25 January 1930	Torquay United	H	5–0	10,497	J. Lane, Foster, W. Lane (3)
26	1 February 1930	Newport County	A	3–1	3,827	W. Lane (2), Foster
27	8 February 1930	Watford	H	5–0	11,356	Payne, Blakemore, W. Lane (2), J. Lane
28	15 February 1930	Coventry City	A	1–2	12,146	Blakemore
29	22 February 1930	Fulham	H	5–1	21,966	Blakemore, W. Lane, J. Lane (3)
30	1 March 1930	Norwich City	A	2–2	14,081	Foster (2)
31	8 March 1930	Crystal Palace	H	2–0	19,555	W. Lane, Payne
32	15 March 1930	Gillingham	A	3–1	6,749	Payne (2), W. Lane
33	22 March 1930	Northampton Town	H	2–0	16,460	W. Lane (2)
34	26 March 1930	Bournemouth & Boscombe Athletic	A	2–1	5,494	W. Lane, Payne (pen)
35	29 March 1930	Exeter City	A	0–0	7,219	
36	5 April 1930	Southend United	H	2–1	13,255	Payne (2)
37	12 April 1930	Luton Town	A	1–2	11,150	W. Lane
38	18 April 1930	Queens Park Rangers	A	1–2	22,179	Blakemore
39	19 April 1930	Bournemouth & Boscombe Athletic	H	1–0	7,694	J. Lane
40	21 April 1930	Queens Park Rangers	H	3–0	18,549	W. Lane (3)
41	26 April 1930	Walsall	A	2–1	2,917	W. Lane, Sherlaw
42	3 May 1930	Bristol Rovers	A	1–4	6,402	J. Lane

=== FA Cup ===
Round	Date	Opponent	Venue	Attendance	Result
1R	30 November 1929	Southend United	A	n/a	0–1

- Sources: Statto, 11v11, 100 Years of Brentford

== Playing squad ==
Players' ages are as of the opening day of the 1929–30 season.

Pos.	Name	Nat.	Date of birth (age)	Signed from	Signed in	Notes
Goalkeepers
GK	Freddie Fox	(England)	22 November 1898 (aged 30)	Halifax Town	1928	
Defenders
DF	Tom Adamson	(Scotland)	12 February 1901 (aged 28)	Bury	1929	
DF	George Dumbrell	(England)	23 September 1906 (aged 22)	Dartford	1928	
DF	William Hodge	(Scotland)	31 August 1904 (aged 25)	Rangers	1927	
DF	Alexander Stevenson	(Scotland)	24 October 1903 (aged 25)	Armadale	1927	
Midfielders
HB	Jimmy Bain	(Scotland)	6 February 1899 (aged 30)	Manchester Central	1928	
HB	Bill Caesar	(England)	25 November 1899 (aged 29)	Dulwich Hamlet	1929	Amateur
HB	Reginald Davies (c)	(England)	30 September 1897 (aged 31)	Portsmouth	1928	
HB	Harry Salt	(England)	20 January 1899 (aged 30)	Crystal Palace	1929	
HB	Teddy Ware	(England)	17 September 1906 (aged 22)	Chatham Town	1928	
Forwards
FW	Cecil Blakemore	(England)	8 December 1897 (aged 31)	Bristol City	1929	
FW	Jackie Foster	(England)	21 March 1903 (aged 26)	Bristol City	1929	
FW	Billy Lane	(England)	23 October 1904 (aged 24)	Reading	1929	
FW	Jack Lane	(England)	29 May 1898 (aged 31)	Chesterfield	1925	
FW	John Payne	(England)	3 January 1906 (aged 23)	West Ham United	1929	
FW	David Sherlaw	(Scotland)	17 September 1901 (aged 27)	Charlton Athletic	1928	
FW	Percy Whipp	(Scotland)	28 June 1897 (aged 32)	Airdrieonians	1929	
Players who left the club mid-season
FW	Ernie Watkins	(England)	3 April 1898 (aged 31)	Southend United	1926	Transferred to Millwall

- Sources: 100 Years of Brentford, Timeless Bees, Football League Players' Records 1888 to 1939

== Coaching staff ==
Name	Role
(England) Harry Curtis	Manager
(England) Bob Kane	Trainer
(England) Jack Cartmell	Assistant Trainer

== Statistics ==
=== Appearances and goals ===

Brentford's starting lineup for 21 consecutive matches in all competitions during the season.

Pos	Nat	Name	League		FA Cup		Total	
Pos	Nat	Name	Apps	Goals	Apps	Goals	Apps	Goals
GK	(England)	Freddie Fox	42	0	1	0	43	0
DF	(Scotland)	Tom Adamson	35	0	1	0	36	0
DF	(England)	George Dumbrell	9	0	0	0	9	0
DF	(Scotland)	William Hodge	8	0	0	0	8	0
DF	(Scotland)	Alexander Stevenson	32	0	1	0	33	0
HB	(Scotland)	Jimmy Bain	41	2	1	0	42	2
HB	(England)	Bill Caesar	1	0	0	0	1	0
HB	(England)	Reginald Davies	42	0	1	0	43	0
HB	(England)	Harry Salt	40	0	1	0	41	0
HB	(England)	Teddy Ware	2	0	0	0	2	0
FW	(England)	Cecil Blakemore	42	15	1	0	43	15
FW	(England)	Jackie Foster	41	6	1	0	42	6
FW	(England)	Billy Lane	42	33	1	0	43	33
FW	(England)	Jack Lane	34	19	1	0	35	19
FW	(England)	John Payne	42	16	1	0	43	16
FW	(Scotland)	David Sherlaw	1	1	0	0	1	1
FW	(England)	Ernie Watkins	1	0	0	0	1	0
FW	(Scotland)	Percy Whipp	7	1	0	0	7	1

- Players listed in italics left the club mid-season.
- Source: 100 Years of Brentford

=== Goalscorers ===
Pos.	Nat	Player	FL3	FAC	Total
FW	(England)	Billy Lane	33	0	33
FW	(England)	Jack Lane	19	0	19
FW	(England)	John Payne	16	0	16
FW	(England)	Cecil Blakemore	15	0	15
FW	(England)	Jackie Foster	6	0	6
HB	(Scotland)	Jimmy Bain	2	0	2
FW	(Scotland)	David Sherlaw	1	0	1
FW	(Scotland)	Percy Whipp	1	0	1
Opponents			1	0	1
Total			94	0	94

- Players listed in italics left the club mid-season.
- Source: 100 Years of Brentford

=== Management ===
Name	Nat	From	To	Record All Comps					Record League				
Name	Nat	From	To	P	W	D	L	W %	P	W	D	L	W %
Harry Curtis	(England)	31 August 1929	3 May 1930	43	28	5	10	65.12|	42	28	5	9	66.67

=== Summary ===
Games played	43 (42 Third Division South, 1 FA Cup)
Games won	28 (28 Third Division South, 0 FA Cup)
Games drawn	5 (5 Third Division South, 0 FA Cup)
Games lost	10 (9 Third Division South, 1 FA Cup)
Goals scored	94 (94 Third Division South, 0 FA Cup)
Goals conceded	45 (44 Third Division South, 1 FA Cup)
Clean sheets	13 (13 Third Division South, 0 FA Cup)
Biggest league win	6–0 versus Merthyr Town, 14 September 1929
Worst league defeat	4–1 versus Bristol Rovers, 3 May 1930
Most appearances	43, Freddie Fox, Reginald Davies, Cecil Blakemore, Billy Lane, John Payne (42 Third Division South, 1 FA Cup)
Top scorer (league)	33, Billy Lane
Top scorer (all competitions)	33, Billy Lane

== Transfers & loans ==
Cricketers are not included in this list.

Players transferred in
Date	Pos.	Name	Previous club	Fee	Ref.
2 May 1929	FW	(England) Cecil Blakemore	(England) Bristol City	£250	
2 May 1929	FW	(England) Jackie Foster	(England) Bristol City	£250	
May 1929	FW	(England) Billy Lane	(England) Reading	Exchange	
May 1929	FW	(England) John Payne	(England) West Ham United	Free	
May 1929	HB	(England) Harry Salt	(England) Crystal Palace	Free	
May 1929	DF	(England) George Weeks	(England) Southall	Free	
May 1929	FW	(Scotland) Percy Whipp	(Scotland) Airdrieonians	Free	
July 1929	DF	(Scotland) Tom Adamson	(England) Bury	Free	
1929	HB	(England) Joe James	(England) Battersea Church	Free	
1929	FW	G. Preston	Unattached	n/a	
March 1930	FW	(England) George Barnes	(England) Chesham United	Amateur	
April 1930	GK	(England) Frank McDonough	(England) Annfield Plain	Free	
Players transferred out
Date	Pos.	Name	Subsequent club	Fee	Ref.
May 1929	FW	(England) Alfred Douglas	(England) Reading	Exchange	
October 1929	FW	(Scotland) Andy Durnion	(England) Gillingham	n/a	
February 1930	FW	(England) Ernie Watkins	(England) Millwall	n/a	
Players released
Date	Pos.	Name	Subsequent club	Join date	Ref.
19 October 1929	DF	(England) Ted Winship	Died of yellow jaundice		
May 1930	FW	(England) George Barnes	(England) Chesham United	1930	
May 1930	FW	G. Preston	Unattached	n/a	
May 1930	HB	(Scotland) Charlie Reddock	(England) Thames	1930	
May 1930	FW	(Scotland) Percy Whipp	(England) Swindon Town	14 May 1930	
