= 1932–33 Brentford F.C. season =

English football team season

Brentford
1932–33 season
- Chairman: Louis P. Simon
- Manager: Harry Curtis
- Stadium: Griffin Park
- Third Division South: 1st (promoted)
- FA Cup: First round
- Top goalscorer: League: Holliday (38); All: Holliday (39)
- Highest home attendance: 20,693
- Lowest home attendance: 8,377
- Average home league attendance: 13,300
Home colours

During the 1932–33 English football season, Brentford competed in the Football League Third Division South. Brentford won the division championship and secured promotion to the second tier of English football for the first time in the club's history. Jack Holliday set a new club goalscoring record of 39 goals in a season, which as of 2025 has yet to be broken. It is statistically Brentford's second-best season, after 1929–30.

== Season summary ==
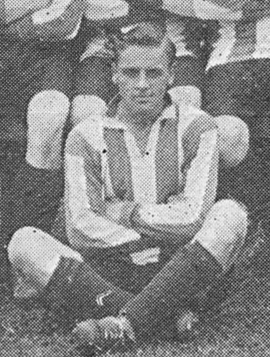
Brentford's then-longest serving player Bill Berry was transferred to Crystal Palace in part-exchange for Idris Hopkins in November 1932.

Brentford manager Harry Curtis made a number of signings in the 1932 off-season, but none would prove more crucial to the club's future success than the acquisition of forwards Jack Holliday, Billy Scott and half back Herbert Watson from First Division Middlesbrough for a combined £1,500 fee in May 1932. The majority of the money was raised from the sale of record goalscorer Billy Lane to Watford earlier that month. The club entered the season with one of its youngest-ever squads.

Brentford had a dream start to the Third Division South season, going undefeated and winning 12 of the opening 14 matches. A new club record of 16 consecutive undefeated Football League matches was established, with the run stretching back to wins in the final two matches of the 1931–32 season. The record stood until it was overtaken during 2013–14. The Bees topped the table after the second match of the season. After briefly dropping back to 2nd on goal difference, they quickly rose back to the summit and remained there until a 5–5 draw with Luton Town (which set a new club record for highest aggregate score in an away Football League match) on 1 February 1933 dropped the club back to 2nd. Manager Curtis signed a new three-year contract in January 1933 and forward Jack Holliday was in prolific scoring form, hitting 26 goals in his first 20 appearances of the season, including four hat-tricks. One of the hat-tricks comprised five goals in the draw with Luton Town, which made Holliday the first player to score five goals for Brentford in a Football League match.

Brentford went back to the top of the table after a 6–0 victory over Newport County on 4 February, the team's biggest victory of the season. Aside from a minor blip in mid-March through to early-April, the Bees held onto top spot and clinched the Third Division South championship after a 2–1 victory over Brighton & Hove Albion on 26 April 1933, with nearest rivals Exeter City five points behind with only two matches to play. Brentford drew the remaining three matches of the season and were promoted to the Second Division for the first time in the club's history.

Jack Holliday broke Billy Lane's three-year old club record for most goals in a season with four strikes in a 7–3 mauling of Cardiff City on 1 April and he finished the season with 39 goals in all competitions. Despite his exploits, Holliday did not finish as the Third Division South's top scorer, due to Coventry City's Clarrie Bourton bettering Holliday's total of 38 by two goals. A number of Football League club records were set during the season, including fewest away defeats (4), fewest defeats (6), most away goals scored (45) and most points (62 – two points for a win). Brentford's average Football League home attendance of 13,300 was the highest in the Third Division South. 1932–33 is statistically Brentford's second-best season, with the club having acquired 2.10 points per game under the current ruling of three points for a win.

=== Reserve team ===
Brentford's reserve team finished as champions of the London Combination for the second successive season. The team won all their home matches during the season, which formed a large chunk of the reserve team club record of 43 consecutive home victories, a run which ran from November 1931 to November 1933. Ralph Allen captained the team, scored a large chunk of the goals and the final match of the season versus Aldershot Reserves was played in front of a crowd of 9,000, a club record for a reserve team fixture.

== League table ==
Pos	Team	Pld	W	D	L	GF	GA	GAv	Pts	Promotion
1	Brentford (C, P)	42	26	10	6	90	49	1.837	62	Promotion to the Second Division
2	Exeter City	42	24	10	8	88	48	1.833	58	
3	Norwich City	42	22	13	7	88	55	1.600	57	
4	Reading	42	19	13	10	103	71	1.451	51	
5	Crystal Palace	42	19	8	15	78	64	1.219	46	

(C) Champions; (P) Promoted

== Results ==
Brentford's goal tally listed first.

=== Legend ===
Win	Draw	Loss

=== Football League Third Division South ===
No.	Date	Opponent	Venue	Result	Attendance	Scorer(s)
1	27 August 1932	Queens Park Rangers	A	3–2	24,381	Holliday (2), Crompton
2	29 August 1932	Coventry City	A	3–2	18,909	Foster, Allen (2)
3	3 September 1932	Torquay United	H	3–1	12,567	Holliday, Foster, Scott
4	8 September 1932	Coventry City	H	2–1	8,377	Holliday (2)
5	10 September 1932	Exeter City	A	2–1	8,184	Holliday (2)
6	17 September 1932	Luton Town	H	1–0	15,409	Robson
7	24 September 1932	Newport County	A	6–1	7,343	Holliday (3), Scott (2), Robson
8	1 October 1932	Bournemouth & Boscombe Athletic	H	1–1	12,963	Crompton
9	8 October 1932	Swindon Town	A	0–0	6,659	
10	15 October 1932	Clapton Orient	H	4–2	14,440	Holliday (3), Robson
11	22 October 1932	Southend United	A	1–0	9,453	Crompton
12	29 October 1932	Crystal Palace	H	2–0	17,827	Robson, Holliday
13	5 November 1932	Gillingham	A	3–1	12,880	Holliday (3)
14	12 November 1932	Watford	H	2–1	14,661	Robson, Scott
15	19 November 1932	Cardiff City	A	1–2	5,274	Scott
16	3 December 1932	Norwich City	A	0–3	14,180	
17	17 December 1932	Bristol Rovers	A	4–2	15,355	Burns, Scott (2), Allen
18	24 December 1932	Aldershot	H	2–0	11,972	Crompton (2)
19	26 December 1932	Northampton Town	A	0–1	14,210	
20	27 December 1932	Northampton Town	H	1–0	18,747	Scott
21	31 December 1932	Queens Park Rangers	H	2–1	14,981	Beecham (og), Crompton
22	7 January 1933	Torquay United	A	1–1	4,882	Holliday
23	21 January 1933	Exeter City	H	0–2	10,769	
24	1 February 1933	Luton Town	A	5–5	3,044	Holliday (5, 1 pen)
25	4 February 1933	Newport County	H	6–0	10,060	Hopkins (2), Holliday (2), Walsh, Scott
26	11 February 1933	Bournemouth & Boscombe Athletic	A	1–1	6,853	Crompton
27	18 February 1933	Swindon Town	H	1–0	11,559	Walsh
28	25 February 1933	Clapton Orient	A	5–1	7,814	Scott, Crompton, Holliday (2), Hopkins
29	4 March 1933	Southend United	H	3–1	14,288	Holliday (2), Scott
30	11 March 1933	Crystal Palace	A	1–2	20,261	Scott
31	18 March 1933	Gillingham	H	1–2	11,445	Robson
32	25 March 1933	Watford	A	1–1	10,057	Holliday
33	1 April 1933	Cardiff City	H	7–3	10,831	Muttitt, Holliday (4, 1 pen), Crompton (2)
34	8 April 1933	Reading	A	3–1	16,089	Muttitt, Holliday, Crompton
35	14 April 1933	Bristol City	A	2–1	19,326	Muttitt, Scott
36	14 April 1933	Norwich City	H	2–2	20,693	Stephens, Hopkins
37	17 April 1933	Bristol City	H	2–1	15,212	Hopkins, Scott
38	22 April 1933	Brighton & Hove Albion	A	2–1	8,659	Holliday, Hopkins
39	26 April 1933	Brighton & Hove Albion	H	2–1	12,638	Muttitt, Holliday
40	29 April 1933	Bristol Rovers	H	0–0	10,355	
41	3 May 1933	Reading	H	1–1	9,511	Walsh
42	6 May 1933	Aldershot	A	1–1	5,145	Holliday

=== FA Cup ===
Round	Date	Opponent	Venue	Result	Attendance	Scorer(s)
1R	26 November 1932	Reading	A	2–3	18,000	Scott, Holliday

- Sources: Statto, 11v11, 100 Years of Brentford

== Playing squad ==
Players' ages are as of the opening day of the 1932–33 season.

Pos.	Name	Nat.	Date of birth (age)	Signed from	Signed in	Notes
Goalkeepers
GK	Tom Baker	(England)	17 August 1905 (aged 27)	Southport	1932	
Defenders
DF	Tom Adamson	(Scotland)	12 February 1901 (aged 31)	Bury	1929	
DF	Jack French	(England)	1903 (aged 28–29)	Southend United	1932	
DF	William Hodge	(Scotland)	31 August 1904 (aged 27)	Rangers	1927	
DF	Alexander Stevenson	(Scotland)	24 October 1903 (aged 28)	Armadale	1927	
Midfielders
HB	Jimmy Bain (c)	(Scotland)	6 February 1899 (aged 33)	Manchester Central	1928	
HB	Jackie Burns	(England)	27 November 1906 (aged 25)	Queens Park Rangers	1931	Amateur
HB	Joe James	(England)	13 January 1910 (aged 22)	Battersea Church	1929	
HB	Duncan McKenzie	(Scotland)	10 August 1912 (aged 20)	Albion Rovers	1932	
HB	Teddy Ware	(England)	17 September 1906 (aged 25)	Chatham Town	1928	
HB	Herbert Watson	(England)	20 November 1908 (aged 23)	Middlesbrough	1932	
Forwards
FW	Ralph Allen	(England)	30 June 1906 (aged 26)	Fulham	1930	
FW	Arthur Crompton	(England)	9 January 1903 (aged 29)	Southend United	1932	
FW	Jackie Foster	(England)	21 March 1903 (aged 29)	Bristol City	1929	
FW	Jack Holliday	(England)	19 December 1908 (aged 23)	Middlesbrough	1932	
FW	Idris Hopkins	(Wales)	11 October 1910 (aged 21)	Crystal Palace	1932	
FW	Ernest Muttitt	(England)	24 July 1908 (aged 24)	Middlesbrough	1932	
FW	George Robson	(England)	17 June 1908 (aged 24)	West Ham United	1931	
FW	Billy Scott	(England)	6 December 1907 (aged 24)	Middlesbrough	1932	
FW	Bert Stephens	(England)	13 May 1909 (aged 23)	Ealing Association	1931	
FW	Charlie Walsh	(England)	27 October 1910 (aged 21)	Arsenal	1933	
FW	Alf Wheeler	(England)	4 April 1910 (aged 22)	Mossley	1932	
Players who left the club mid-season
FW	Bill Berry	(England)	18 August 1904 (aged 28)	Gillingham	1926	Transferred to Crystal Palace

- Sources: 100 Years of Brentford, Timeless Bees, Football League Players' Records 1888 to 1939

== Coaching staff ==
Name	Role
(England) Harry Curtis	Manager
(England) Bob Kane	Trainer
(England) Jack Cartmell	Assistant trainer
(England) Fred Keatch	Secretary

== Statistics ==
=== Appearances and goals ===

Brentford's highest appearance-makers in each position during the Football League season.

Pos	Nat	Name	League		FA Cup		Total	
Pos	Nat	Name	Apps	Goals	Apps	Goals	Apps	Goals
GK	(England)	Tom Baker	42	0	1	0	43	0
DF	(Scotland)	Tom Adamson	27	0	1	0	28	0
DF	(England)	Jack French	5	0	0	0	5	0
DF	(Scotland)	William Hodge	25	0	0	0	25	0
DF	(Scotland)	Alexander Stevenson	27	0	1	0	28	0
HB	(Scotland)	Jimmy Bain	37	0	1	0	38	0
HB	(England)	Jackie Burns	37	1	1	0	37	1
HB	(England)	Joe James	5	0	0	0	5	0
HB	(Scotland)	Duncan McKenzie	2	0	0	0	2	0
HB	(England)	Teddy Ware	11	0	1	0	12	0
HB	(England)	Herbert Watson	34	0	0	0	34	0
FW	(England)	Ralph Allen	8	3	0	0	8	3
FW	(England)	Bill Berry	1	0	—		1	0
FW	(England)	Arthur Crompton	31	11	1	0	32	11
FW	(England)	Jackie Foster	21	2	1	0	22	2
FW	(England)	Jack Holliday	34	38	1	1	35	39
FW	(Wales)	Idris Hopkins	21	6	0	0	21	6
FW	(England)	Ernest Muttitt	14	4	0	0	14	4
FW	(England)	George Robson	24	6	1	0	25	6
FW	(England)	Billy Scott	41	14	1	1	42	15
FW	(England)	Bert Stephens	4	1	0	0	4	1
FW	(England)	Charlie Walsh	10	3	—		10	3
FW	(England)	Alf Wheeler	1	0	0	0	1	0

- Players listed in italics left the club mid-season.
- Source: 100 Years of Brentford

=== Goalscorers ===
Pos.	Nat	Player	FL3	FAC	Total
FW	(England)	Jack Holliday	38	1	39
FW	(England)	Billy Scott	14	1	15
FW	(England)	Arthur Crompton	11	0	11
FW	(Wales)	Idris Hopkins	6	0	6
FW	(England)	George Robson	6	0	6
FW	(England)	Ernest Muttitt	4	0	4
FW	(England)	Ralph Allen	3	0	3
FW	(England)	Charlie Walsh	3	0	3
FW	(England)	Jackie Foster	2	0	2
HB	(England)	Jackie Burns	1	0	1
FW	(England)	Bert Stephens	1	0	1
Opponents			1	0	1
Total			90	2	92

- Players listed in italics left the club mid-season.
- Source: 100 Years of Brentford

=== Amateur international caps ===
Pos.	Nat	Player	Caps	Goals	Ref
FW	(England)	Jackie Burns	3	1	

=== Management ===
Name	Nat	From	To	Record All Comps					Record League				
Name	Nat	From	To	P	W	D	L	W %	P	W	D	L	W %
Harry Curtis	(England)	27 August 1932	6 May 1933	43	26	10	7	60.47|	42	26	10	6	61.90

=== Summary ===
Games played	43 (42 Third Division South, 1 FA Cup)
Games won	26 (26 Third Division South, 0 FA Cup)
Games drawn	10 (10 Third Division South, 0 FA Cup)
Games lost	7 (6 Third Division South, 1 FA Cup)
Goals scored	92 (90 Third Division South, 2 FA Cup)
Goals conceded	52 (49 Third Division South, 3 FA Cup)
Clean sheets	9 (9 Third Division South, 0 FA Cup)
Biggest league win	6–0 versus Newport County, 4 February 1933
Worst league defeat	3–0 versus Norwich City, 3 December 1932
Most appearances	43, Tom Baker (42 Third Division South, 1 FA Cup)
Top scorer (league)	38, Jack Holliday
Top scorer (all competitions)	39, Jack Holliday

== Transfers & loans ==
Cricketers are not included in this list.

Players transferred in
Date	Pos.	Name	Previous club	Fee	Ref.
May 1932	FW	(England) Jack Holliday	(England) Middlesbrough	n/a	
May 1932	HB	(England) Herbert Watson	(England) Middlesbrough	n/a	
May 1932	FW	(England) Billy Scott	(England) Middlesbrough	n/a	
1 August 1932	HB	(Scotland) Duncan McKenzie	(Scotland) Albion Rovers	£350	
August 1932	DF	(England) Jack French	(England) Southend United	Free	
October 1932	FW	(England) Ernest Muttitt	(England) Middlesbrough	n/a	
November 1932	FW	(Wales) Idris Hopkins	(England) Crystal Palace	£200	
1932	GK	(England) Tom Baker	(England) Southport	Free	
1932	DF	(Scotland) Robert Fulton	(Scotland) Glasgow Perthshire	n/a	
1932	FW	(Scotland) Fred Pope	(Scotland) Partick Thistle	n/a	
1932	FW	(England) Alf Wheeler	(England) Mossley	Free	
January 1933	FW	(England) Charlie Walsh	(England) Arsenal	n/a	
Players transferred out
Date	Pos.	Name	Subsequent club	Fee	Ref.
11 August 1932	FW	(Scotland) Norman Thomson	(England) Swindon Town	n/a	
May 1932	FW	(England) Billy Lane	(England) Watford	£1,500	
November 1932	FW	(England) Bill Berry	(England) Crystal Palace	Part-exchange	
Players released
Date	Pos.	Name	Subsequent club	Join date	Ref.
May 1933	FW	(England) Arthur Crompton	(England) Crystal Palace	1933	
May 1933	FW	(England) Jackie Foster	(England) Barrow	July 1933	
May 1933	FW	(England) Herbert Lawson	(England) Luton Town	1933	
May 1933	HB	(England) Robert Morris	(England) Norwich City	1933	
May 1933	FW	(England) Alf Wheeler	(England) Northampton Town	1933	
