= John Payne (footballer, born 1906) =

English footballer

Personal information
- Full name: John Frederick Payne
- Date of birth: 3 January 1906
- Place of birth: Southall, England
- Date of death: 1981 (aged 74–75)
- Position: Outside left

Senior career*
Years	Team	Apps	(Gls)
- Botwell Mission
- Lyons Athletic
- Southall
1926–1929	West Ham United	4	(1)
1929–1931	Brentford	52	(18)
1931–1934	Manchester City	4	(1)
1934	Brighton & Hove Albion	8	(1)
1935	Millwall	7	(0)
- Yeovil & Petters United
Total		75+	(21+)
- * Club domestic league appearances and goals

John Frederick Payne (3 January 1906 – 1981) was an English professional footballer who played as an outside left in the Football League for Brentford, Brighton & Hove Albion, Millwall, West Ham United and Manchester City.

== Playing career ==
=== Early years ===
An outside left, Payne began his career in non-League football, playing for Botwell Mission, Lyons Athletic and hometown club Southall. Payne got his big break when he signed for First Division club West Ham United in 1926, but he managed just four appearances, scoring one goal, before departing in 1929.

=== Brentford ===
Payne dropped down to the Third Division South to sign for Brentford in 1929. He scored 16 goals in 43 appearances during the 1929–30 season and was the club's third-leading scorer behind Jack Lane and Billy Lane. Payne began the 1930–31 season as a first choice on the wing, but he fell out of favour and was dropped to the reserves, before leaving in January 1931. Payne made 53 appearances and scored 18 goals during 18 months with the Bees.

=== Manchester City ===
Payne joined First Division club Manchester City in January 1931. As at West Ham United, Payne struggled to break into the first team and made just four appearances, scoring one goal, before departing Maine Road in 1934.

=== Later career ===
Payne's made his final Football League appearances with Third Division South clubs Brighton & Hove Albion and Millwall.

== Career statistics ==
Appearances and goals by club, season and competition
Club	Season	League			FA Cup		Total	
Club	Season	Division	Apps	Goals	Apps	Goals	Apps	Goals
West Ham United	1926–27	First Division	1	0	0	0	1	0
West Ham United	1928–29	First Division	3	1	0	0	3	1
West Ham United	Total		4	1	0	0	4	1
Brentford	1929–30	Third Division South	42	16	1	0	43	16
Brentford	1930–31	Third Division South	10	2	0	0	10	2
Brentford	Total		52	18	1	0	53	18
Manchester City	1931–32	First Division	2	1	0	0	2	1
Manchester City	1933–34	First Division	2	0	0	0	2	0
Manchester City	Total		4	1	0	0	4	1
Millwall	1935–36	Third Division South	7	0	0	0	7	0
Career Total			67	20	1	0	68	20
