= Frederick Gamble =

Frederick or Fred Gamble may refer to:

- Frederick Gamble (cricketer) (1905–1965), English cricketer and footballer
- Frederick William Gamble (1869–1926), British zoologist and author
- Fred Gamble (actor) (1868–1939), American film actor
- Fred Gamble (racing driver) (1932–2024), American racing driver
