= Dave Hannam =

English footballer (born 1944)

Personal information
- Full name: David Vincent Hannam
- Date of birth: 10 May 1944 (age 82)
- Place of birth: Islington, England
- Height: 5 ft 7 in (1.70 m)
- Position: Outside right

Senior career*
Years	Team	Apps	(Gls)
1961–1963	Brighton & Hove Albion	5	(2)
1963–1964	Tunbridge Wells Rangers		
1964	Slavia		
- Crawley Town
- Hastings United
- Southwick
- * Club domestic league appearances and goals

David Vincent Hannam (born 10 May 1944) is an English former professional footballer who played as an outside right in the Football League for Brighton & Hove Albion., making his debut against Portsmouth in 1962.

He was signed by Billy Lane and played under George Curtis. Albion failed to ward off relegation, however, and were demoted to the Fourth Division of English football at the end of the 1962-1963 season. He was sold by new manager Archie McCaulay as part of an end-of-season clear out.

He went on to play non-league football for Tunbridge Wells Rangers, Crawley Town, Hastings United and Southwick and in Australia for Victorian State League club Slavia. After twice breaking a leg while with Southwick, he retired from football and later went into business in Florida, where he currently resides.
