= Percy Whipp =

Scottish footballer

Personal information
- Full name: Percy Leonard Whipp
- Date of birth: 28 June 1897
- Place of birth: Glasgow, Scotland
- Date of death: 18 October 1962 (aged 65)
- Place of death: Ealing, England
- Height: 5 ft 11 in (1.80 m)
- Position: Forward

Youth career
- West London Old Boys

Senior career*
Years	Team	Apps	(Gls)
1919–1920	Western Athletic		
1920–1921	Ton Pentre		
1921–1922	Clapton Orient	20	(8)
1922	Sunderland	1	(0)
1922–1927	Leeds United	145	(44)
1927–1929	Clapton Orient	68	(17)
1929–1930	Brentford	7	(1)
1930–1931	Swindon Town	9	(5)
1931–1932	Bath City		
- Worcester City
- * Club domestic league appearances and goals

Percy Leonard Whipp (28 June 1897 – 18 October 1962) was a Scottish professional footballer who played as a forward in the Football League for Leeds United and Clapton Orient. He also played League football for Swindon Town, Brentford and Sunderland.

== Personal life ==
Whipp served as a gunner in the Royal Field Artillery during the First World War.

== Career statistics ==
Appearances and goals by club, season and competition
Club	Season	League			FA Cup		Total	
Club	Season	Division	Apps	Goals	Apps	Goals	Apps	Goals
Sunderland	1922–23	First Division	1	0	0	0	1	0
Leeds United	1922–23	Second Division	29	15	3	1	32	16
Leeds United	1923–24	Second Division	39	11	4	2	43	13
Leeds United	1924–25	First Division	35	10	1	0	36	10
Leeds United	1925–26	First Division	27	5	1	0	28	5
Leeds United	1926–27	First Division	15	3	0	0	15	3
Leeds United	Total		145	44	9	3	154	47
Brentford	1929–30	Third Division South	7	1	0	0	7	1
Swindon Town	1930–31	Third Division South	9	5	0	0	9	5
Career total			162	50	9	3	171	53

== Honours ==
Leeds United

- Football League Second Division: 1923–24
