= Dave Smith (footballer, born 1903) =

Scottish footballer

Personal information
- Full name: David Lamont McQueen Smith
- Date of birth: 6 July 1903
- Place of birth: Coatbridge, Scotland
- Position: Goalkeeper

Senior career*
Years	Team	Apps	(Gls)
- Pollok
1922–1924	Albion Rovers	11	(0)
1923–1924	→ Mid-Annandale (loan)	20	(0)
1924–1925	Mid-Annandale	6	(0)
1925–1928	Queen of the South	106	(0)
1928–1929	Hamilton Academical	34	(0)
1929–1931	Gillingham	26	(0)
1931–1932	Brentford	7	(0)
- Nithsdale Wanderers
- * Club domestic league appearances and goals

David Lamont McQueen Smith (born 6 July 1903, date of death unknown) was a Scottish professional football goalkeeper who made over 100 appearances in the Scottish League for Queen of the South. He also played in the Scottish League for Hamilton Academical, Mid-Annandale and Albion Rovers and in the Football League for Gillingham and Brentford.

== Career statistics ==
Club	Season	League			National Cup		Other		Total	
Club	Season	Division	Apps	Goals	Apps	Goals	Apps	Goals	Apps	Goals
Albion Rovers	1923–24	Scottish Second Division	1	0	0	0	—		1	0
Albion Rovers	1924–25	Scottish Second Division	10	0	0	0	—		10	0
Albion Rovers	Total		11	0	0	0	—		11	0
Mid-Annandale (loan)	1923–24	Scottish Third Division	20	0	5	0	—		25	0
Mid-Annandale	1924–25	Scottish Third Division	6	0	—		—		6	0
Mid-Annandale	Mid-Annandale total		26	0	5	0	—		31	0
Queen of the South	1924–25	Scottish Third Division	10	0	2	0	—		12	0
Queen of the South	1925–26	Scottish Second Division	38	0	2	0	—		40	0
Queen of the South	1926–27	Scottish Second Division	37	0	2	0	—		39	0
Queen of the South	1927–28	Scottish Second Division	21	0	0	0	—		21	0
Queen of the South	Total		106	0	6	0	—		112	0
Hamilton Academical	1928–29	Scottish First Division	34	0	3	0	1 (Note: Appearance in Lanarkshire Cup.)	0	38	0
Gillingham	1929–30	Third Division South	20	0	1	0	—		21	0
Gillingham	1930–31	Third Division South	6	0	0	0	—		6	0
Gillingham	Total		26	0	1	0	—		27	0
Brentford	1931–32	Third Division South	7	0	0	0	—		7	0
Career total			210	0	15	0	1	0	226	0
