= Les Roberts (footballer) =

English footballer

Personal information
- Full name: Charles Leslie Roberts
- Date of birth: 28 February 1901
- Place of birth: Halesowen, England
- Date of death: 29 May 1980 (aged 79)
- Place of death: Christchurch, England
- Height: 5 ft 10 1/2 in (1.79 m)
- Position: Inside forward

Senior career*
Years	Team	Apps	(Gls)
- Kidderminster Harriers
1921	Aston Villa		
- Cradley Heath St. Luke's
1921–1922	Redditch		
1922	Bristol Rovers	0	(0)
1922–1923	Chesterfield	6	(4)
1923–1924	Sheffield Wednesday	0	(0)
1924	Bristol Rovers	0	(0)
1924	Merthyr Town	12	(2)
1924–1926	Bournemouth & Boscombe Athletic	51	(11)
1926–1927	Bolton Wanderers	6	(2)
1927–1930	Swindon Town	106	(34)
1930–1931	Brentford	5	(0)
1931	Manchester City	8	(2)
1931	Exeter City	11	(4)
1932–1934	Crystal Palace	50	(19)
1933	Chester	5	(2)
1934	Rotherham United	9	(5)
- Scunthorpe & Lindsey United
1936–1937	New Brighton	40	(11)
- South Liverpool
Total		306	(92)
- * Club domestic league appearances and goals

Charles Leslie Roberts (28 February 1901 – 29 May 1980), sometimes known as Charles Roberts, was an English professional footballer who made over 300 appearances as an inside forward in the Football League. He is best remembered for his three years with Swindon Town, for whom he made 119 appearances and scored 35 goals.

== Career statistics ==
Appearances and goals by club, season and competition
Club	Season	League			FA Cup		Total	
Club	Season	Division	Apps	Goals	Apps	Goals	Apps	Goals
Chesterfield	1922–23	Third Division North	6	4	0	0	6	4
Merthyr Town	1924–25	Third Division South	12	2	1	0	13	2
Bournemouth & Boscombe Athletic	1924–25	Third Division South	26	6	―		26	6
Bournemouth & Boscombe Athletic	1925–26	Third Division South	25	5	5	2	30	7
Bournemouth & Boscombe Athletic	Total		51	11	5	2	56	13
Bolton Wanderers	1925–26	First Division	4	2	―		4	2
Bolton Wanderers	1926–27	First Division	2	0	0	0	2	0
Bolton Wanderers	Total		6	2	0	0	6	2
Swindon Town	1927–28	Third Division South	37	14	5	0	42	14
Swindon Town	1928–29	Third Division South	41	10	5	0	46	10
Swindon Town	1929–30	Third Division South	28	10	3	1	31	11
Swindon Town	Total		106	34	13	1	119	35
Brentford	1930–31	Third Division South	5	0	0	0	5	0
Manchester City	1930–31	First Division	8	2	0	0	8	2
Career total			194	55	19	3	213	58
