= Jackie Foster =

English footballer and coach

Personal information
- Full name: John Thomas Foster
- Date of birth: 21 March 1903
- Place of birth: Southwick, England
- Height: 5 ft 6 1/2 in (1.69 m)
- Position: Outside right

Senior career*
Years	Team	Apps	(Gls)
- Murton Colliery Welfare
1920–1921	Sunderland	5	(0)
1921–1923	Ashington	68	(5)
1923–1925	Halifax Town	73	(2)
1925–1926	Grimsby Town	10	(1)
1926–1929	Bristol City	47	(4)
1929–1933	Brentford	141	(21)
1933–1936	Barrow	87	(21)
1936–1937	Colwyn Bay United		
1937	Ashford		
Total		431	(54)
- * Club domestic league appearances and goals

John Thomas Foster (21 March 1903 – after 1936) was an English professional footballer and coach who played as an outside right. He made over 430 appearances in the Football League over sixteen seasons for a total of seven clubs, most notably for Brentford, Halifax Town, Ashington, Barrow and Bristol City.

== Playing career ==
An outside right, Foster began his Football League career with hometown First Division club Sunderland, joining them from Murton Colliery Welfare in August 1920. He made his league debut for "The Black Cats" aged 17 on 25 September 1920 in an away match against Huddersfield Town, but made only a further 4 league appearances for the club.

After a solitary season with Sunderland he then dropped through the leagues and had two successive two-season spells in the Third Division North with firstly Ashington and then Halifax Town. In his first season with Ashington (which was the club's first in the Football League, with Foster playing in their inaugural match) he missed only eight league games and was an ever-present in the second season appearing in all 38 of their league matches in the 1922–23 campaign. He scored his first Football League goal on 18 February 1922, one of a brace, in Ashington's 7–3 defeat of Rochdale. He had a similar appearance record with Halifax for whom he signed in September 1923, in his two campaigns with "The Shaymen" he played in 73 of the 80 league games available to him.

He next moved to Grimsby Town, signing with them in May 1925. During his single season with "The Mariners", in which he made ten league appearances, they won the 1925–26 season Third Division North title. In June 1926 Foster transferred to Third Division South club Bristol City. They won the league title in his first season however, Foster only played in one match and did not receive a champions medal. After a further two seasons with "The Robins", now in the Second Division, he had played in a total of 51 games scoring 5 goals (including 47 games with 4 goals in the league) before he departed Ashton Gate at the end of the 1928–29 season.

In May 1929 Foster and Bristol City teammate Cyril Blakemore joined Third Division South club Brentford, for a combined fee of £500. He was a virtual ever-present until the 1932–33 season, when he made just 22 appearances, but still contributed to the Bees' Third Division South title. Foster departed Griffin Park in 1933 having made a total of 153 league and cup appearances and scoring 21 goals.

Foster signed for Third Division North club Barrow in July 1933 and in the 1933–34 season he played in all 42 of the club's league matches scoring a personal best 14 league goals during the season. He played in 36 matches in the league the next season but in 1935–36, Foster's final season playing in the Football League, he made only nine league appearances for the Holker Street club. Of the total of his 21 goals scored in the league for Barrow, four were scored from the penalty spot (his only career Football League penalty goals) – his last goal for Barrow, and his final one in the Football League scored on 16 November 1936 was a penalty against Rotherham United.

In 1936 he moved into non-league football and joined Birmingham & District League club Colwyn Bay United. In the summer of 1937 he signed with Ashford of the Kent League.

== Coaching career ==
After retiring from football, Foster had a spell coaching in Belgium.

== Personal life ==
Foster's brother Jimmy was also a footballer and was on the books at Brentford, but failed to make an appearance for the first team. Late in his career, whilst with Barrow, in addition to playing Foster was involved in the licensed trade.

== Honours ==
Grimsby Town

- Football League Third Division North: 1925–26

Bristol City

- Football League Third Division South: 1926–27

Brentford

- Football League Division Three South: 1932–33

== Football League career statistics ==
Appearances and goals by club, season and competition
Club	Season	League			FA Cup		Total	
Club	Season	Division	Apps	Goals	Apps	Goals	Apps	Goals
Sunderland	1920–21	First Division	5	0	1	0	6	0
Ashington	1921–22	Third Division North	30	3	1	1	31	4
Ashington	1922–23	Third Division North	38	2	1	0	39	2
Ashington	Total		68	5	2	1	70	6
Halifax Town	1923–24	Third Division North	38	2	8	1	46	3
Halifax Town	1924–25	Third Division North	35	0	1	0	36	0
Halifax Town	Total		73	2	9	1	82	3
Grimsby Town	1925–26	Third Division North	10	1	0	0	10	1
Bristol City
Bristol City	1926–27	Third Division South	1	0	3	1	4	1
Bristol City	1927–28	Second Division	29	3	0	0	29	3
Bristol City	1928–29	Second Division	17	1	1	0	18	1
Bristol City	Total		47	4	4	1	51	5
Brentford
Brentford	1929–30	Third Division South	41	6	1	0	42	6
Brentford	1930–31	Third Division South	39	1	5	0	44	1
Brentford	1931–32	Third Division South	40	12	5	0	45	12
Brentford	1932–33	Third Division South	21	2	1	0	22	2
Brentford	Total		141	21	12	0	153	21
Barrow
Barrow	1933–34	Third Division North	42	14	2	0	44	14
Barrow	1934–35	Third Division North	36	6	2	0	38	6
Barrow	1935–36	Third Division North	9	1	2	1	11	2
Barrow	Total		87	21	6	1	93	22
Career total			431	54	34	4	465	58
