= William Hodge (footballer) =

Scottish footballer

Personal information
- Full name: William Hodge
- Date of birth: 31 August 1904
- Place of birth: Croy, Scotland
- Positions: Full back; wing half

Youth career
- –1924: Baillieston

Senior career*
Years	Team	Apps	(Gls)
1924–1927	Rangers	2	(0)
1927–1935	Brentford	118	(1)
- * Club domestic league appearances and goals

William Hodge was a Scottish professional footballer who played for Rangers and Brentford as a full back.

== Career ==
Hodge began his career in Scotland with Scottish Division One club Rangers, but was behind Tommy Muirhead in the half back pecking order and made only two appearances for the club. He moved to England to join Third Division South club Brentford in August 1927. An injury to Tom Adamson in October 1929 allowed Hodge to blossom as a full back. Hodge was part of the Bees team which was crowned Third Division South champions at the end of the 1932–33 season, making 25 appearances. In the Second Division, Hodge lost his place at full back to Arthur Bateman and departed the club in 1935. Hodge made 125 appearances and scored one goal during his seven years at Griffin Park.

== Personal life ==
Hodge was born in Croy and grew up in Twechar. His brother Robert was also a footballer.

== Career statistics ==
Appearances and goals by club, season and competition
Club	Season	League			National Cup		Total	
Club	Season	Division	Apps	Goals	Apps	Goals	Apps	Goals
Rangers	1925–26	Scottish Division One	2	0	0	0	2	0
Brentford	1927–28	Third Division South	19	1	1	0	20	1
Brentford	1928–29	Third Division South	3	0	2	0	5	0
Brentford	1929–30	Third Division South	8	0	0	0	8	0
Brentford	1930–31	Third Division South	19	0	0	0	19	0
Brentford	1931–32	Third Division South	29	0	3	0	32	0
Brentford	1932–33	Third Division South	25	0	0	0	25	0
Brentford	1933–34	Second Division	15	0	1	0	16	0
Brentford	Total		118	1	7	0	125	1
Career total			120	1	7	0	127	1

== Honours ==
Brentford

- Football League Third Division South: 1932–33
- London Charity Fund: 1928
