= Teddy Ware =

English footballer

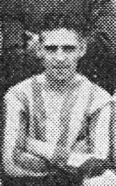
- Ware while with Brentford in 1928.

Personal information
- Full name: Edward Alfred George Ware
- Date of birth: 17 September 1906
- Place of birth: Chatham, England
- Date of death: September 1976 (aged 69–70)
- Place of death: Chatham, England
- Height: 5 ft 7 in (1.70 m)
- Position: Wing half

Youth career
- Rainham

Senior career*
Years	Team	Apps	(Gls)
1925–1928	Chatham Town		
1928–1933	Brentford	96	(0)
1933–1936	Clapton Orient	106	(3)
1936–1937	Swindon Town	5	(0)
1937–1939	Crewe Alexandra	62	(0)
1939	Shorts Sports		
- * Club domestic league appearances and goals

Edward Alfred George Ware (17 September 1906 – September 1976) was an English professional footballer, best remembered for his time as a wing half in the Football League with Clapton Orient and Brentford.

== Career ==
=== Chatham Town ===
Ware began his career at Rainham and moved to Kent League club Chatham Town in 1925. He won the division title with the club in the 1926–27 season and departed in March 1928.

=== Brentford ===
Ware and Chatham Town teammate Len Ramsell earned moves to Third Division South club Brentford in March 1928. Ware quickly became a first team regular at wing half and his "never-say-die attitude" won him plaudits from the Brentford supporters. Ware was also a part of the team which was promoted as champions to the Second Division in the 1932–33 season. Ware departed Griffin Park at the end of the 1932–33 season, after making 102 appearances for the club.

=== Later years ===
Ware signed for Third Division South club Clapton Orient in August 1933 and made 106 league appearances for the Os, scoring three goals. He had a short spell at Third Division South club Swindon Town during the 1936–37 season and made five appearances. Ware joined Third Division North club Crewe Alexandra in 1937 and made league 62 appearances before the breakout of the Second World War in 1939 brought his League career to an end.

== Career statistics ==
Appearances and goals by club, season and competition
Club	Season	League			FA Cup		Total	
Club	Season	Division	Apps	Goals	Apps	Goals	Apps	Goals
Brentford	1928–29	Third Division South	25	0	0	0	25	0
Brentford	1929–30	Third Division South	2	0	0	0	2	0
Brentford	1930–31	Third Division South	17	0	0	0	17	0
Brentford	1931–32	Third Division South	41	0	5	0	46	0
Brentford	1932–33	Third Division South	11	0	1	0	12	0
Brentford	Total		96	0	6	0	102	0
Swindon Town	1936–37	Third Division South	5	0	0	0	5	0
Career total			101	0	6	0	107	0

== Honours ==
Chatham Town

- Kent League: 1926–27

Brentford

- Football League Third Division South: 1932–33
