= Les Wilkins =

Welsh footballer (1907–1979)

Personal information
- Full name: Leslie Wilkins
- Date of birth: 21 July 1907
- Place of birth: Swansea, Wales
- Date of death: 1979 (aged 71–72)
- Positions: Inside forward; wing half

Youth career
- Hafod United Methodists
- Swansea Red Triangle

Senior career*
Years	Team	Apps	(Gls)
1928	Swansea Town	0	(0)
1929	Merthyr Town	7	(4)
1929	Sunderland	2	(0)
1930	West Ham United	0	(0)
1931–1932	Brentford	19	(1)
1932–1933	Swindon Town	20	(8)
1933–1934	Stockport County	3	(1)
1935	Yeovil & Petters United		
- * Club domestic league appearances and goals

Leslie Wilkins (21 July 1907 – 1979) was a Welsh footballer who played as a inside forward and wing half in the Football League, most notably for Swindon Town and Brentford.

== Career statistics ==
Appearances and goals by club, season and competition
Club	Season	League			FA Cup		Total	
Club	Season	Division	Apps	Goals	Apps	Goals	Apps	Goals
Sunderland	1929–30	First Division	2	0	0	0	2	0
Brentford	1930–31	Third Division South	2	1	—		2	1
Brentford	1931–32	Third Division South	17	0	4	0	21	0
Brentford	Total		19	1	4	0	23	1
Swindon Town	1932–33	Third Division South	20	8	0	0	20	8
Stockport County	1933–34	Third Division North	3	1	0	0	3	1
Career total			44	10	4	0	48	10
