= Robert Hodge (footballer) =

Scottish footballer

Personal information
- Full name: Robert Hodge
- Position: Outside left

Senior career*
Years	Team	Apps	(Gls)
–1923	Kirkintilloch Rob Roy		
1923–1924	Clyde	2	(0)
- * Club domestic league appearances and goals

Robert Hodge was a Scottish professional footballer who played in the Scottish League for Clyde as an outside left.

== Personal life ==
Hodge's brother William also became a footballer.

== Career statistics ==
Appearances and goals by club, season and competition
Club	Season	League			Scottish Cup		Total	
Club	Season	Division	Apps	Goals	Apps	Goals	Apps	Goals
Clyde	1923–24	Scottish Division One	2	0	0	0	2	0
Career total			2	0	0	0	2	0
