= George Cook (footballer, born 1895) =

English footballer

Personal information
- Full name: George William Cook
- Date of birth: 27 February 1895
- Place of birth: Evenwood, England
- Date of death: 31 December 1980 (aged 85)
- Place of death: Colwyn Bay, Wales
- Height: 5 ft 7 1/2 in (1.71 m)
- Position: Inside left

Youth career
- 1912–1914: Evenwood Juniors
- 1914–1916: Trindle Juniors
- Royal Artillery

Senior career*
Years	Team	Apps	(Gls)
1919–1922	Bishop Auckland		
1922–1923	Rotherham County	42	(8)
1923–1927	Huddersfield Town	87	(35)
1927–1929	Aston Villa	57	(35)
1929–1931	Tottenham Hotspur	63	(22)
1931–1932	Brentford	14	(3)
1932–1934	Colwyn Bay United		
1934–1935	Rhyl		
- * Club domestic league appearances and goals

George William Cook (27 February 1895 – 31 December 1980), sometimes known as Billy Cook, was an English professional footballer, best remembered for his spells as an inside left in the Football League with Huddersfield Town and Aston Villa.

== Career ==
=== Early years ===
Cook began his career with spells as a youth at Evenwood Juniors and Trindle Juniors and played for the Royal Artillery during the First World War. He joined Northern League club Bishop Auckland in 1919 and won the FA Amateur Cup in 1920–21 and 1921–22. A move to Second Division club Rotherham County followed in 1922.

=== Huddersfield Town ===
Cook transferred to First Division club Huddersfield Town in 1923. He was a part of the most successful period in the club's history, winning the First Division championship in the 1923–24, 1924–25 and 1925–26 seasons. He scored 35 goals in 91 appearances before departing the Terriers in February 1927.

=== Aston Villa ===
Cook transferred to First Division club Aston Villa in February 1927. While he failed to win any silverware, Cook was in prolific goalscoring form, scoring 40 goals in 61 matches before departing at the end of the 1928–29 season.

=== Tottenham Hotspur ===
Cook transferred to Second Division club Tottenham Hotspur during the 1929 off-season. Now aged 34, he scored 30 goals in 73 appearances before his release in April 1931.

=== Brentford ===
Cook moved across London to sign for Third Division South club Brentford during the 1931 off-season. In a mediocre season for the club, he scored three goals in 15 appearances. With the arrival of forwards Jack Holliday and Billy Scott, Cook departed Brentford at the end of the 1931–32 season.

=== Colwyn Bay United ===
Cook ended his career in non-League football with spells at Birmingham & District League clubs Colwyn Bay United and Rhyl.

== Career statistics ==
Appearances and goals by club, season and competition
Club	Season	League			FA Cup		Total	
Club	Season	Division	Apps	Goals	Apps	Goals	Apps	Goals
Huddersfield Town	1923–24	First Division	25	9	1	0	26	9
Huddersfield Town	1924–25	First Division	25	9	1	0	26	9
Huddersfield Town	1925–26	First Division	29	14	1	0	30	14
Huddersfield Town	1926–27	First Division	8	3	1	0	9	3
Huddersfield Town	Total		87	35	4	0	91	35
Aston Villa	1926–27	First Division	13	9	―		13	9
Aston Villa	1927–28	First Division	35	23	3	4	38	27
Aston Villa	1928–29	First Division	9	3	1	1	10	4
Aston Villa	Total		57	35	4	5	61	40
Tottenham Hotspur	1929–30	First Division	32	9	2	1	34	10
Tottenham Hotspur	1930–31	First Division	31	13	2	1	33	14
Tottenham Hotspur	Total		63	22	4	2	67	24
Brentford	1931–32	Third Division South	14	3	1	0	15	3
Career total			221	95	13	7	234	102

== Honours ==
Bishop Auckland

- FA Amateur Cup: 1920–21, 1921–22

Huddersfield Town

- Football League First Division: 1923–24, 1924–25, 1925–26
