= Jack Lane =

English footballer (1898–1984)

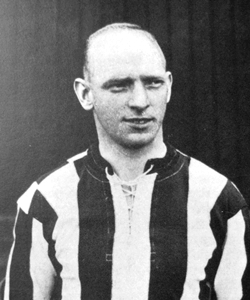
- Lane with Brentford in 1926.

Personal information
- Full name: John William Lane
- Date of birth: 29 May 1898
- Place of birth: Cradley Heath, England
- Date of death: June 1984 (aged 86)
- Place of death: Hammersmith, England
- Height: 5 ft 6 in (1.68 m)
- Position: Inside forward

Senior career*
Years	Team	Apps	(Gls)
–1920	Cradley Heath		
1920–1923	Burnley	5	(0)
1923–1925	Chesterfield	65	(19)
1925–1931	Brentford	216	(74)
1931–1932	Crystal Palace	34	(10)
1932–1933	Aldershot	36	(8)
Total		356	(111)
- * Club domestic league appearances and goals

John William Lane (29 May 1898 – June 1984) was an English professional footballer who played as an inside right. He is best remembered for his five years in the Football League with Brentford, for whom he made 234 appearances and was club captain. He was posthumously inducted into the Brentford Hall of Fame in 2015.

== Club career ==
=== Burnley ===
An inside forward, Lane began his career at hometown non-League club Cradley Heath. He secured a move to the top flight of English football with Burnley in December 1920 and made his professional debut during the club's Championship-winning 1920–21 season. He failed to make an impression at Turf Moor and departed in 1923, having made just five league appearances for the Clarets.

=== Chesterfield ===
Lane dropped down to the Third Division North to sign for Chesterfield in 1923, in part-exchange for Philip Pedlar. The Spireites pushed hard for promotion during his time with the club and he departed in March 1925. Lane made 70 appearances and scored 19 goals during his time at Saltergate.

=== Brentford ===
Lane transferred to Third Division South strugglers Brentford in March 1925. He got off to a good start at Griffin Park, scoring on his debut versus Swansea Town and scoring a further three goals in his final eight appearances of the season. He established himself as a first team regular in the following season, making 40 appearances and scoring 9 goals. The arrival of Harry Curtis as manager in 1926 saw Lane appointed as captain and was he was an automatic pick when fit. His final two seasons were his best at Griffin Park, when he scored 19 goals in each of the 1929–30 and 1930–31 seasons. As a recognition of his service to the club, Lane was awarded the proceeds from a London Combination match versus Southampton in 1930. He departed Brentford in January 1931 and at the time was the club's record Football League goalscorer, having amassed 234 appearances and 86 goals during just under six years at Griffin Park. Lane was posthumously inducted into the Brentford Hall of Fame in 2015.

=== Crystal Palace ===
Lane transferred to Third Division South club Crystal Palace on 29 January 1931. As with his time at Brentford, he narrowly missed out on promotion from the division and left the club in September 1932, having scored 10 goals in 34 appearances.

=== Aldershot ===
Lane transferred to Third Division South club Aldershot in September 1932. He played for one season at the Recreation Ground before retiring, having scored eight goals in 36 appearances.

== Personal life ==
After retiring from football in 1933, Lane was licensee of the Royal Horse Guardsmen pub in Ealing Road, Brentford until 1980. He lived in Brentford and died in 1984.

== Career statistics ==
Appearances and goals by club, season and competition
Club	Season	League			FA Cup		Total	
Club	Season	Division	Apps	Goals	Apps	Goals	Apps	Goals
Burnley	1920–21	First Division	1	0	0	0	1	0
Burnley	1921–22	First Division	2	0	0	0	2	0
Burnley	1922–23	First Division	2	0	0	0	2	0
Burnley	Total		5	0	0	0	5	0
Chesterfield	1923–24	Third Division North	39	11	3	0	42	11
Chesterfield	1924–25	Third Division North	26	8	2	0	28	8
Chesterfield	Total		65	19	5	0	70	19
Brentford	1924–25	Third Division South	9	4	—		9	4
Brentford	1925–26	Third Division South	38	8	2	1	40	9
Brentford	1926–27	Third Division South	41	9	8	4	49	13
Brentford	1927–28	Third Division South	37	11	1	0	38	11
Brentford	1928–29	Third Division South	32	9	1	2	33	11
Brentford	1929–30	Third Division South	34	19	1	0	35	19
Brentford	1930–31	Third Division South	25	14	5	5	30	19
Brentford	Total		216	74	18	12	234	86
Career total			286	93	23	12	309	105

== Honours ==
- Brentford Hall of Fame
