= Charlie Walsh (footballer) =

English footballer

Personal information
- Full name: Charles Henry Walsh
- Date of birth: 27 October 1910
- Place of birth: London, England
- Date of death: 24 April 1954 (aged 43)
- Place of death: London, England
- Position: Inside forward

Youth career
- Hampstead Town

Senior career*
Years	Team	Apps	(Gls)
1930–1933	Arsenal	0	(0)
1933–1935	Brentford	10	(3)
- * Club domestic league appearances and goals

Charles Henry Walsh (27 October 1910 – 24 April 1954) was an English footballer who played as an inside forward in the Football League for Brentford. He made one FA Cup appearance for Arsenal in 1933. Injury forced Walsh into early retirement in 1935.

== Honours ==
Brentford

- Football League Third Division South: 1932–33

== Career statistics ==
Appearances and goals by club, season and competition
Club	Season	League			FA Cup		Total	
Club	Season	Division	Apps	Goals	Apps	Goals	Apps	Goals
Arsenal	1932–33	First Division	0	0	1	0	1	0
Brentford	1932–33	Third Division South	10	3	—		10	3
Career total			10	3	1	0	11	3
