= Reginald Davies (footballer, born 1897) =

English footballer

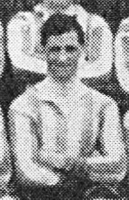
- Davies while with Brentford in 1928.

Personal information
- Full name: Reginald Davies
- Date of birth: 30 September 1897
- Place of birth: Stanton Hill, England
- Date of death: 7 January 1977 (aged 79)
- Place of death: Sutton-in-Ashfield, England
- Position: Wing half

Senior career*
Years	Team	Apps	(Gls)
–1922	Sutton Town		
1922–1928	Portsmouth	201	(3)
1928–1932	Brentford	116	(0)
1932–1933	Mansfield Town	18	(0)
- Rufford Colliery
Total		335	
- * Club domestic league appearances and goals

Reginald Davies (30 September 1897 – 7 January 1977) was an English professional footballer who made over 330 appearances in the Football League for Portsmouth, Brentford and Mansfield Town as a wing half.

== Career ==
=== Early years ===
A wing half, Davies began his career in non-League football with local club Sutton Town.

=== Portsmouth ===
Davies began his league career at Third Division South club Portsmouth in July 1922 and captained the team which rose from the basement to the First Division in four seasons. He departed Fratton Park at the end of the 1927–28 season, after making 216 appearances and scoring three goals for Pompey.

=== Brentford ===
Aged almost 30, Davies dropped back down to the Third Division South to sign for Brentford during the 1928 off-season for a £250 fee. Despite his age, he was a virtual ever-present for the team at wing half and played in all 42 league games of the 1929–30 season, when the Bees won all 21 home games at Griffin Park to set a record which has never been equalled. He dropped down into the reserves in 1931 and helped the team win the 1931–32 London Combination. Davies left the Bees at the end of the 1931–32 season and made 123 appearances for the club.

=== Later years ===
Davies returned to his native Nottinghamshire and played for Third Division North club Mansfield Town during the 1932–33 season, before ending his career back in non-League football with Rufford Colliery.

== Career statistics ==
Appearances and goals by club, season and competition
Club	Season	League			FA Cup		Total	
Club	Season	Division	Apps	Goals	Apps	Goals	Apps	Goals
Portsmouth	1922–23	Third Division South	21	0	0	0	21	0
Portsmouth	1923–24	Third Division South	33	0	4	0	37	0
Portsmouth	1924–25	Second Division	41	0	4	0	45	0
Portsmouth	1925–26	Second Division	40	0	3	0	43	0
Portsmouth	1926–27	Second Division	42	2	3	0	45	2
Portsmouth	1927–28	First Division	24	1	1	0	25	1
Portsmouth	Total		201	3	15	0	216	3
Brentford	1928–29	Third Division South	36	0	2	0	38	0
Brentford	1929–30	Third Division South	42	0	1	0	43	0
Brentford	1930–31	Third Division South	38	0	4	0	42	0
Brentford	Total		116	0	7	0	123	0
Career total			317	3	22	0	339	3

== Honours ==
Portsmouth

- Football League Second Division second-place promotion: 1926–27
- Football League Third Division South: 1923–24

Brentford Reserves

- London Combination: 1931–32
