= Jack French (footballer) =

English footballer

Personal information
- Full name: John Proctor French
- Date of birth: 1903
- Place of birth: Stockton-on-Tees, England
- Date of death: 1952 (aged 48–49)
- Position: Right back

Senior career*
Years	Team	Apps	(Gls)
1924–1925	Middlesbrough	1	(0)
1925–1932	Southend United	174	(2)
1932–1934	Brentford	5	(0)
- Tunbridge Wells Rangers
- * Club domestic league appearances and goals

John Proctor French (1903–1952) was an English professional footballer who made over 170 appearances as a right back in the Football League for Southend United. He later captained the Brentford reserve team to a London Combination title.

== Personal life ==
French's grandson, Trevor Hoffman, is a former professional baseball relief pitcher who was inducted into the Baseball Hall of Fame in 2018.

== Career statistics ==
Appearances and goals by club, season and competition
Club	Season	League			FA Cup		Total	
Club	Season	Division	Apps	Goals	Apps	Goals	Apps	Goals
Middlesbrough	1924–25	Second Division	1	0	0	0	1	0
Southend United	Total		174	2	10	0	184	2
Brentford	1932–33	Third Division South	5	0	0	0	5	0
Career total			180	2	10	0	190	2

== Honours ==
Brentford Reserves

- London Combination: 1932–33
