= Matthew Smailes =

English footballer

Personal information
- Date of birth: 25 March 1899
- Place of birth: Lancaster, England
- Date of death: 1978 (aged 78–79)

Senior career*
Years	Team	Apps	(Gls)
- Annfield Plain
1925–1928	Blackburn Rovers	4	(0)
1928–1929	West Ham United	7	(0)
1930–1931	Coventry City	11	(0)
1931–?	Ashington		
- * Club domestic league appearances and goals

Matthew Smailes (25 March 1899 – 1978) was an English footballer who played for Blackburn Rovers, West Ham United and Coventry City as a half-back.

Born in Lancaster, Lancashire, Smailes began his career at Annfield Plain before moving to Blackburn Rovers, where he made four league appearances.

Signed as an understudy to Jimmy Collins, Jim Barrett or Albert Cadwell, Smailes made his debut for West Ham United on 9 February 1929, in a game that saw Vic Watson smash six goals past Leeds United. He played 10 league and cup games for the east London club.

Smailes played 11 Third Division South games for Coventry after leaving West Ham. He joined Ashington in August 1931.
