= Bill Bann =

Scottish footballer

Personal information
- Full name: William Edward Bann
- Date of birth: 15 August 1902
- Place of birth: Broxburn, Scotland
- Date of death: 16 March 1973 (aged 70)
- Place of death: Haringey, England
- Height: 5 ft 10 1/2 in (1.79 m)
- Position: Full back

Senior career*
Years	Team	Apps	(Gls)
–1922	Winchburgh Thistle		
1922–1923	Broxburn United	8	(0)
1923–1929	Tottenham Hotspur	12	(0)
1929–1930	Tottenham Hotspur	0	(0)
1930–1932	Brentford	7	(0)
1932–1933	Bristol Rovers	1	(0)
1933–1934	Aldershot	7	(0)
1934	Northfleet United		
- * Club domestic league appearances and goals

William Edward Bann (15 August 1902 – 16 March 1973) was a Scottish professional footballer who played as a full back in the Football League for Tottenham Hotspur, Brentford, Bristol Rovers and Aldershot. He also played in the Scottish League for Broxburn United.

== Career ==
A full back, Bann's senior career began at Scottish League Second Division club Broxburn United. He moved to England to join First Division club Tottenham Hotspur in February 1923 and made 12 appearances before his release in May 1929. He was then re-signed, but failed to make any further appearances before departing White Hart Lane for the final time at the end of the 1929–30 season. Bann joined Third Division South club Brentford in June 1930 and made seven appearances before joining Bristol Rovers in 1932, where he made just a solitary league appearance. He finished his career with spells at Aldershot and Northfleet United.

== Career statistics ==
Appearances and goals by club, season and competition
Club	Season	League			National cup (Note: Includes Scottish Cup, FA Cup)		Total	
Club	Season	Division	Apps	Goals	Apps	Goals	Apps	Goals
Broxburn United	1922–23	Scottish Second Division	8	0	0	0	8	0
Tottenham Hotspur	1925–26	First Division	8	0	0	0	8	0
Tottenham Hotspur	1928–29	Second Division	4	0	0	0	4	0
Tottenham Hotspur	Total		12	0	0	0	12	0
Brentford	1930–31	Third Division South	3	0	0	0	3	0
Brentford	1931–32	Third Division South	4	0	0	0	4	0
Brentford	Total		7	0	0	0	7	0
Bristol Rovers	1932–33	Third Division South	1	0	0	0	1	0
Career total			28	0	0	0	28	0
