= Johnny McPhee =

Scottish footballer

Personal information
- Full name: John McPhee
- Date of birth: 1909
- Place of birth: Stirling, Scotland
- Date of death: 1986 (aged 76–77)
- Height: 5 ft 7 in (1.70 m)
- Position: Winger

Youth career
- 1928–1929: Cowie Thistle Juveniles

Senior career*
Years	Team	Apps	(Gls)
1929–1930	Sunderland	4	(0)
1930–1931	Brentford	0	(0)
1931–193?	Albion Rovers		
- * Club domestic league appearances and goals

John McPhee (1909–1986) was a Scottish professional footballer who played as a winger for Sunderland.
