= Norman Thomson =

Scottish footballer

Personal information
- Full name: Norman Shaw Thomson
- Date of birth: 20 February 1901
- Place of birth: Greenock, Scotland
- Date of death: 6 June 1984 (aged 83)
- Place of death: Ferring, England
- Position: Inside forward

Youth career
- 1920–1922: St Anthony's

Senior career*
Years	Team	Apps	(Gls)
1922–1924	Dumbarton	64	(15)
1924–1925	Hibernian	5	(0)
1925–1926	Luton Town	43	(10)
1926	Clapton Orient	10	(2)
1927–1928	Brighton & Hove Albion	11	(5)
1928–1929	Walsall	38	(13)
1929–1930	Norwich City	15	(0)
1930–1932	Brentford	1	(0)
1932–1933	Swindon Town	3	(0)
1933	Folkestone		
- * Club domestic league appearances and goals

Norman Shaw Thomson (20 February 1901 – 6 June 1984) was a Scottish professional footballer, best remembered for his three-year spell as an inside forward with Dumbarton in the Scottish League. He also played in the Football League, most notably for Luton Town and Walsall.

== Career statistics ==
Appearances and goals by club, season and competition
Club	Season	League			National cup (Note: Includes Scottish Cup, FA Cup)		Total	
Club	Season	Division	Apps	Goals	Apps	Goals	Apps	Goals
Dumbarton	1921–22	Scottish First Division	7	2	—		7	2
Dumbarton	1922–23	Scottish Second Division	33	7	1	0	34	7
Dumbarton	1923–24	Scottish Second Division	21	5	1	0	22	5
Dumbarton	Total		61	14	2	0	63	14
Hibernian	1924–25	Scottish First Division	5	0	0	0	5	0
Luton Town	1925–26	Third Division South	26	5	0	0	26	5
Luton Town	1926–27	Third Division South	17	5	1	0	18	5
Luton Town	Total		43	10	1	0	44	10
Clapton Orient	1926–27	Second Division	10	2	—		10	2
Brighton & Hove Albion	1927–28	Third Division South	11	5	0	0	11	5
Walsall	1928–29	Third Division South	38	13	4	2	42	15
Norwich City	1929–30	Third Division South	15	0	0	0	15	0
Brentford	1930–31	Third Division South	1	0	0	0	1	0
Swindon Town	1932–33	Third Division South	3	0	0	0	3	0
Career total			187	44	7	2	194	46
