= Bert Stephens =

English footballer

Personal information
- Full name: Herbert James Stephens
- Date of birth: 13 May 1909
- Place of birth: Chatham, England
- Date of death: August 1987 (aged 78)
- Place of death: Thanet, England
- Height: 5 ft 8 in (1.73 m)
- Position: Outside forward

Senior career*
Years	Team	Apps	(Gls)
–1931	Ealing Association		
1931–1935	Brentford	6	(1)
1935–1948	Brighton & Hove Albion	180	(86)
- * Club domestic league appearances and goals

Herbert James Stephens (13 May 1909 – September 1987) was an English professional footballer, best remembered for his time as an outside forward in the Football League with Brighton & Hove Albion. At the time of his retirement in 1948, Stephens was Brighton's second-highest goalscorer.

== Career ==
=== Brentford ===
An outside forward, Stephens began his career at amateur club Ealing Association and joined Third Division South club Brentford in February 1931. He made just six appearances for the club and scored one goal, before his departure at the end of the 1934–35 season. Stephens spent much of his time with the club in the reserve team, with whom he won two London Combination titles and the 1934–35 London Challenge Cup.

=== Brighton & Hove Albion ===
Stephens joined Third Division South club Brighton & Hove Albion in June 1935. He was Brighton's top scorer in the 1936–37 season, with 26 goals in all competitions and again in 1938–39, with 17 goals. After competitive football was suspended in 1939 due to the outbreak of the Second World War, Stephens remained with the Gulls. He retired in 1948, after scoring 86 goals in 180 league games and at the time he was Brighton's second-highest goalscorer. Including his tally in wartime matches, Stephens scored 174 goals for the Gulls.

== Personal life ==
A Kent native, Stephens was born in Chatham and died in Thanet.

== Career statistics ==
Appearances and goals by club, season and competition
Club	Season	League			FA Cup		Total	
Club	Season	Division	Apps	Goals	Apps	Goals	Apps	Goals
Brentford	1931–32	Third Division South	2	0	0	0	2	0
Brentford	1932–33	Third Division South	4	1	0	0	4	1
Career total			6	1	0	0	6	1

== Honours ==
Brentford Reserves

- London Combination (2): 1931–32, 1932–33
- London Challenge Cup (1): 1934–35
