= Bert Watson =

Australian rules footballer

Personal information
- Full name: Cecil Herbert Marriott Watson
- Born: 23 October 1878; Horsham, Victoria
- Died: 5 March 1961 (aged 82); Johannesburg, South Africa
- Original team: Melbourne Grammar

Playing career^{1}
Years	Club	Games (Goals)
1897	Melbourne	11 (0)
- ^{1} Playing statistics correct to the end of 1897.

Cecil Herbert Marriott Watson (23 October 1878 – 5 March 1961) was a former Australian rules footballer who played with Melbourne in the Victorian Football League (VFL).
