= George Weeks (footballer) =

English footballer

Personal information
- Full name: George Bartholomew Weeks
- Date of birth: 5 August 1902
- Place of birth: Poplar, England
- Date of death: 28 June 1982 (aged 79)
- Place of death: Folkestone, England
- Position: Full back

Senior career*
| Years | Team | Apps | (Gls) |
| 1925–1927 | Millwall United | | |
| 1927–1928 | Sittingbourne | | |
| 1928–1929 | Southall | | |
| 1929–1932 | Brentford | 2 | (0) |
| 1932–1933 | Watford | 1 | (0) |
- Ford Motors
- Dagenham

International career
- Athenian League XI
- * Club domestic league appearances and goals

George Bartholomew Weeks (5 August 1902 – 28 June 1982) was an English footballer who played as a full back in the Football League for Brentford and Watford.

== Career statistics ==
Appearances and goals by club, season and competition
| Club | Season | League | | | FA Cup | | Total | |
| Club | Season | Division | Apps | Goals | Apps | Goals | Apps | Goals |
|---|---|---|---|---|---|---|---|---|
| Brentford | 1931–32 | Third Division South | 2 | 0 | 0 | 0 | 2 | 0 |
| Watford | 1932–33 | Third Division South | 1 | 0 | 0 | 0 | 1 | 0 |
| Career total | | | 3 | 0 | 0 | 0 | 3 | 0 |
