= Richard Hill (footballer, born 1893) =

English footballer

Personal information
- Full name: Richard Henry Hill
- Date of birth: 26 November 1893
- Place of birth: Mapperley, England
- Date of death: 1971 (aged 77–78)
- Position: Left back

Senior career*
Years	Team	Apps	(Gls)
1919–1930	Millwall	366	(0)
1930	Torquay United	28	(1)
Total		394	(1)

International career
1926	England	1	(0)
- * Club domestic league appearances and goals

Richard Henry Hill (26 November 1893 – 1971) was an English international footballer who played as a left back.

== Career ==
Born in Mapperley, former Grenadier Guard Hill played professionally for Millwall and Torquay United, and earned one cap for England on 24 May 1926 against Belgium in Antwerp.

Dick played mainly as a left back, but also played at centre half and right back. He played 314 Football League games, 24 Southern League games and 28 FA Cup games for Millwall. His total of 366 games leaves him sixth in the list of most appearances for Millwall.

He joined Torquay United in July 1930 and made 28 appearances scoring his only senior goal.
