= Bill Caesar =

English cricketer and footballer

Personal information
- Full name: William Cecil Caesar
- Born: 25 November 1899; Clapham, London, England
- Died: 5 April 1988 (aged 88); Richmond-upon-Thames, Surrey, England
- Batting: Right-handed
- Bowling: Right-arm medium-fast
- Role: Bowler

Domestic team information
- Years: Team
- 1922: Surrey
- 1946: Somerset
- FC debut: 1 June 1922 Surrey v Scotland
- Last FC: 6 August 1946 Somerset v Gloucestershire

Career statistics
Competition	First-class
Matches	4
Runs scored	14
Batting average	4.66
100s/50s	0/0
Top score	7
Balls bowled	606
Wickets	10
Bowling average	25.20
5 wickets in innings	0
10 wickets in match	0
Best bowling	4/59
Catches/stumpings	3/–
- Source: CricketArchive, 1 January 2010

William Cecil Caesar (25 November 1899 – 5 April 1988) was an English first-class cricketer who played for Surrey in one match in 1922 and then, 24 years later, in three matches for Somerset in 1946.

== Cricket career ==
Caesar was a lower-order right-handed batsman and a right-arm medium fast bowler, "distinctly quick" in his younger days, said his obituary in Wisden. He was picked in a reduced-strength Surrey side for a first-class match against Scotland in June 1922, not batting and failing to take a wicket in 14 overs. Across the following years, he played on occasion for Surrey's second eleven in the Minor Counties Championship and for the Civil Service cricket team in minor matches.

Then, in 1946, "no more than military medium and of comfortable build by then", says one account, he played three matches for Somerset. Wisden described him at this stage as a "Bath amateur". In his first game for Somerset, against Leicestershire at Melton Mowbray, he scored 5 not out and then 7, and these were his highest batting scores in first-class cricket; in Leicestershire's innings, he took two for 11 and four for 59, and these were the best bowling returns of his career.

== Football career ==
Caesar was also a well-known amateur football player and played for the England international team, as well as for Football League teams such as Darlington, Fulham and Brentford.
