= Ernie Beecham =

English footballer

Personal information
- Full name: Ernest Cromwell Beecham
- Date of birth: 23 July 1906
- Place of birth: Hertford, England
- Date of death: 14 August 1985 (aged 79)
- Place of death: Hertford, England
- Position: Goalkeeper

Senior career*
Years	Team	Apps	(Gls)
- Ward End Works
- Hertford Town
1925–1932	Fulham	174	(0)
1932–1935	Queens Park Rangers	86	(0)
1935	Brighton & Hove Albion	0	(0)
1935–1936	Swindon Town	8	(0)
- * Club domestic league appearances and goals

Ernest Cromwell Beecham (23 July 1906 – 1985) was an English professional footballer who made over 170 appearances in the Football League for Fulham as a goalkeeper. He holds for the club record for consecutive appearances after a debut (130) and his run was only halted by a cervical fracture of his spine, which he suffered in 1928. Beecham also played league football for Queens Park Rangers and Swindon Town.

== Personal life ==
Beecham attended Cowper School, Hertford.

== Career statistics ==
Appearances and goals by club, season and competition
Club	Season	League			FA Cup		Total	
Club	Season	Division	Apps	Goals	Apps	Goals	Apps	Goals
Fulham	1925–26	Second Division	25	0	5	0	30	0
Fulham	1926–27	Second Division	42	0	2	0	44	0
Fulham	1927–28	Second Division	42	0	1	0	43	0
Fulham	1928–29	Third Division South	13	0	0	0	13	0
Fulham	1929–30	Third Division South	37	0	5	0	42	0
Fulham	1930–31	Third Division South	6	0	0	0	6	0
Fulham	1931–32	Third Division South	9	0	0	0	9	0
Fulham	Total		174	0	13	0	187	0
Queens Park Rangers	1932–33	Third Division South	42	0	5	0	47	0
Queens Park Rangers	1933–34	Third Division South	34	0	4	0	38	0
Queens Park Rangers	1934–35	Third Division South	10	0	0	0	10	0
Queens Park Rangers	Total		86	0	9	0	95	0
Swindon Town	1935–36	Third Division South	8	0	0	0	8	0
Career total			268	0	22	0	290	0
