= Arthur Crompton =

English footballer

Personal information
- Date of birth: 9 January 1903
- Place of birth: Birmingham, England
- Date of death: 1987 (aged 83–84)
- Position: Winger

Senior career*
Years	Team	Apps	(Gls)
1928–1929	Tottenham Hotspur	15	(3)
1930–1932	Southend United	58	(20)
1932–1933	Brentford	43	(14)
1933–1934	Crystal Palace	26	(6)
1935–?	Tranmere Rovers	12	(2)
	Northwich Victoria	?	(?)
- * Club domestic league appearances and goals

Arthur Crompton (9 January 1903 – 1987) was a professional footballer who played for Tottenham Hotspur, Southend United, Brentford, Crystal Palace, Tranmere Rovers and Northwich Victoria.

== Football career ==
Crompton began his career playing for Devon County, and later he represented the British Army football team.

The versatile winger who could play on either flank, joined Tottenham Hotspur in 1928. He scored on his 'Lilywhites' debut in a 2–1 defeat to Bristol City at Ashton Gate in November 1928 in the old Second Division. Crompton featured in 15 matches, netting three goals in his time at White Hart Lane.

Crompton signed for Southend United in 1930 where he went on to make 58 appearances, scoring on 20 occasions.

In 1932, Crompton joined Brentford and notched up a further 14 goals in 43 matches before signing for Crystal Palace.

Crompton featured in 26 games, scoring six goals in his spell at Selhurst Park.

He moved onto Tranmere Rovers in 1935, before finally ending his career at Northwich Victoria.

== Honours ==
Brentford

- Football League Third Division South: 1932–33
