= James Shaw (footballer) =

English footballer

Personal information
- Date of birth: 8 August 1904
- Place of birth: Goldenhill, England
- Height: 5 ft 6 1/4 in (1.68 m)
- Position: Inside forward

Youth career
- Goldenhill Wanderers

Senior career*
Years	Team	Apps	(Gls)
–1925	Bolton Wanderers	0	(0)
1925–1926	Frickley Colliery		
1926–1930	Arsenal	11	(4)
1930–1931	Brentford	1	(0)
1931	Gillingham	9	(0)
- * Club domestic league appearances and goals

James Shaw (8 August 1904 – after 1930) was an English professional footballer who played as an inside forward. He scored 4 goals in 11 appearances in the Football League playing for Arsenal.

== Playing career ==
Shaw was born in Goldenhill, Staffordshire and began his football career with Bolton then moved to Frickley Colliery in the Midland League, before turning professional with Arsenal. He spent four seasons with Arsenal before moving to Brentford in 1930 where he only made limited first team appearances before joining Gillingham in 1931, where he made 10 first team appearances.
