= Albert Woods (footballer) =

English footballer

Personal information
- Full name: Albert Woods
- Date of birth: 1907
- Place of birth: Faversham, England
- Position: Left half

Senior career*
Years	Team	Apps	(Gls)
1931	Gillingham	2	(0)
	Brentford	0	(0)
- * Club domestic league appearances and goals

Albert Woods was an English footballer who played in the Football League for Gillingham as a left half.

== Career statistics ==
Appearances and goals by club, season and competition
Club	Season	League			FA Cup		Total	
Club	Season	Division	Apps	Goals	Apps	Goals	Apps	Goals
Gillingham	1930–31	Third Division South	2	0	―		2	0
Career total			2	0	0	0	2	0
