= George Barnes (footballer, born 1899) =

English footballer

Personal information
- Full name: George Henry Barnes
- Date of birth: 22 May 1899
- Place of birth: Chesham, England
- Date of death: 1 June 1961 (aged 62)
- Place of death: Chesham, England
- Position: Forward

Senior career*
Years	Team	Apps	(Gls)
1919–1923	Watford	6	(1)
- Chesham United
1930	Brentford	0	(0)
- Chesham United
- * Club domestic league appearances and goals

George Henry Barnes (22 May 1899 – 1 June 1961) was an English amateur footballer who played in the Football League for Watford as a forward. He is probably best remembered for his time in non-League football with Chesham United, captaining the club and later presiding as chairman.

== Personal life ==
Barnes' brother Maurice was killed during a Chesham United match in which both brothers were playing. He worked as a boot manufacturer in Chesham.

== Career statistics ==
Appearances and goals by club, season and competition
Club	Season	League			FA Cup		Total	
Club	Season	Division	Apps	Goals	Apps	Goals	Apps	Goals
Watford	1919–20	Southern League First Division	1	0	0	0	1	0
Watford	1921–22	Third Division South	1	1	0	0	1	1
Watford	1922–23	Third Division South	3	0	0	0	3	0
Watford	1923–24	Third Division South	1	0	0	0	1	0
Career total			6	1	0	0	6	1
