= Fred Pope =

Scottish footballer (1909–1983)

Personal information
- Full name: Frederick Daniel Pope
- Date of birth: 20 August 1909
- Place of birth: Govanhill, Scotland
- Date of death: 1983 (aged 73)
- Place of death: Renfrewshire, Scotland
- Height: 5 ft 9 in (1.75 m)
- Positions: Inside right; outside right

Senior career*
Years	Team	Apps	(Gls)
1930–1932	Partick Thistle	10	(2)
1932–	Brentford	0	(0)
	Blackpool	0	(0)
	Stockport County	0	(0)
–1936	Beith		
1936	Ayr United	11	(2)
- Beith
- * Club domestic league appearances and goals

Frederick Daniel Pope (20 August 1909 – 1983) was a Scottish professional footballer who played in the Scottish League for Partick Thistle and Ayr United as a forward.

== Career statistics ==
Appearances and goals by club, season and competition
Club	Season	League			National Cup		Total	
Club	Season	Division	Apps	Goals	Apps	Goals	Apps	Goals
Partick Thistle	1930–31	Scottish First Division	6	1	2	2	8	3
Partick Thistle	1931–32	Scottish First Division	4	1	0	0	4	1
Partick Thistle	Total		10	2	2	2	12	4
Ayr United	1935–36	Scottish First Division	11	2	1	0	12	2
Career total			187	44	7	2	194	46
