= Philip Pedlar =

Welsh footballer

Personal information
- Full name: Philip Pedlar
- Date of birth: 30 April 1899
- Place of birth: Merthyr Tydfil, Wales
- Height: 5 ft 7 1/2 in (1.71 m)
- Position: Wing half

Senior career*
| Years | Team | Apps | (Gls) |
- Merthyr Town
- Rhymney
| 1922–1923 | Chesterfield | 15 | (0) |
| 1923–1924 | Burnley | 0 | (0) |
| 1925–1928 | Merthyr Town | 86 | (6) |
- Ebbw Vale
- * Club domestic league appearances and goals

Philip Pedlar (born 30 April 1899, date of death unknown) was a Welsh professional footballer who played as a full back.
