= Cecil Blakemore =

English footballer

Personal information
- Full name: Cecil Blakemore
- Date of birth: 8 December 1897
- Place of birth: Stourbridge, England
- Date of death: September 1963 (aged 65)
- Place of death: Stourbridge, England
- Height: 5 ft 10 in (1.78 m)
- Position: Inside forward

Senior career*
Years	Team	Apps	(Gls)
1920–1921	Heath Villa		
1921	Aston Villa		
1921–	Stourbridge		
- Fairfield Villa
1922	Redditch		
1922–1927	Crystal Palace	133	(54)
1927–1929	Bristol City	42	(20)
1929–1931	Brentford	77	(28)
1931–1933	Norwich City	70	(29)
1933–1934	Swindon Town	26	(8)
1934	Brierley Hill Alliance		
- * Club domestic league appearances and goals

Cecil Blakemore (8 December 1897 – September 1963) sometimes known as Cyril Blakemore, was an English professional footballer who played as an inside forward in the Football League, most notably for Crystal Palace, Brentford and Norwich City. He also played League football for Bristol City and Swindon Town.

== Career ==
=== Early years ===
An inside forward, Blakemore began his career as an amateur in non-League football in his native West Midlands, playing for Heath Villa, Redditch, Stourbridge and Fairfield Villa. He had a spell with First Division club Aston Villa during the 1921–22 season, but did not make a first team appearance.

=== Crystal Palace ===
Blakemore got his second chance at League football when he signed for Second Division club Crystal Palace in December 1922. He had a slow start to life at Selhurst Park, making just 24 appearances during the 1922–23 and 1923–24 seasons, though he managed five goals in his 12 appearances during 1923–24. Blakemore broke into the team during the 1924–25 season, making 24 appearances and scoring 12 goals in a disastrous season which saw the Eagles relegated to the Third Division South. He was a near ever-present for two seasons in the Third Division South, scoring 36 goals as Palace pushed for promotion back to the Second Division. Blakemore departed Palace in May 1927, having made 141 appearances and scored 56 goals during five years with the club.

=== Bristol City ===
Blakemore moved back up to the Second Division to sign for Bristol City in May 1927. He failed to hold down a regular place in the team, but still managed 20 goals in 42 appearances before departing Ashton Gate in May 1929.

=== Brentford ===
Blakemore and Bristol City teammate Jackie Foster signed for Third Division South club Brentford on 2 May 1929. He quickly established himself in the team, scoring 15 goals in 43 appearances during the 1929–30 season, a campaign in which the Bees set a record of 21 home wins. Blakemore made another 40 appearances the following year, scoring 13 goals, before leaving Brentford in May 1931. Blakemore scored 28 goals in 83 games during two seasons at Griffin Park.

=== Norwich City ===
Blakemore moved to Third Division South club Norwich City in August 1931. He made 70 appearances over the course of two seasons, as the Canaries pushed for promotion to the Second Division.

=== Swindon Town ===
At age 35, Blakemore was brought in by manager Ted Vizard to replace Third Division South club Swindon Town's record goalscorer Harry Morris in June 1933. He scored eight goals in 27 appearances before being released at the end of the 1933–34 season.

=== Brierley Hill Alliance ===
Blakemore ended his career with a spell at Birmingham & District League club Brierley Hill Alliance.

== Career statistics ==
Appearances and goals by club, season and competition
Club	Season	League			FA Cup		Total	
Club	Season	Division	Apps	Goals	Apps	Goals	Apps	Goals
Brentford	1929–30	Third Division South	42	15	1	0	43	15
Brentford	1930–31	Third Division South	35	13	5	0	40	13
Brentford	Total		77	28	6	0	83	28
Swindon Town	1933–34	Third Division South	26	8	1	0	27	8
Career Total			103	36	7	0	110	36
