= Frank McDonough (footballer) =

English footballer

Personal information
- Full name: Francis John Bernard McDonough
- Date of birth: 24 December 1899
- Place of birth: Easington, England
- Date of death: March 1976 (aged 76)
- Place of death: Stockport, England
- Height: 5 ft 10 in (1.78 m)
- Position: Goalkeeper

Youth career
- Haswell

Senior career*
Years	Team	Apps	(Gls)
- Durham City
- Horden Athletic
- Wheatley Hill Colliery
- Shotton Colliery Welfare
- Annfield Plain
1930–1931	Brentford	2	(0)
1931	Thames	26	(0)
1931–1934	Blackpool	82	(0)
1934–1937	Stockport County	132	(0)
1938–1939	Macclesfield	40	(0)
1939	Stockport County	0	(0)
- * Club domestic league appearances and goals

Francis John Bernard McDonough (24 December 1899 – March 1976) was an English professional footballer who played as a goalkeeper in the Football League for Stockport County, Blackpool, Brentford and Thames. He captained Stockport County and Macclesfield.

== Career statistics ==
Appearances and goals by club, season and competition
Club	Season	League			FA Cup		Other		Total	
Club	Season	Division	Apps	Goals	Apps	Goals	Apps	Goals	Apps	Goals
Brentford	1930–31	Third Division South	2	0	0	0	—		2	0
Blackpool	1931–32	First Division	18	0	0	0	—		18	0
Blackpool	1932–33	First Division	40	0	0	0	—		40	0
Blackpool	Total		58	0	0	0	—		58	0
Stockport County	1934–35	Third Division North	24	0	5	0	—		29	0
Stockport County	1935–36	Third Division North	39	0	1	0	—		40	0
Stockport County	1936–37	Third Division North	41	0	1	0	—		42	0
Stockport County	1937–38	Second Division	28	0	1	0	—		29	0
Stockport County	Total		132	0	8	0	—		140	0
Macclesfield	1938–39	Cheshire County League	40	0	3	0	3 (Note: 2 appearances in Cheshire Challenge Cup, 1 appearance in Cheshire Senior Cup)	0	46	0
Career total			232	0	11	0	3	0	246	0

== Honours ==
Stockport County

- Football League Third Division North: 1936–37
