= Frederick Gamble (cricketer) =

English cricketer (1905–1965)

Personal information
- Full name: Frederick Charles Gamble
- Born: 29 May 1905; Charing Cross, London, England
- Died: 15 May 1965 (aged 59); Lambeth, London, England
- Batting: Right-handed
- Bowling: Right-arm medium

Domestic team information
- Years: Team
- 1939: Devon
- 1933–1935: Surrey

Career statistics
Competition	First-class
Matches	19
Runs scored	132
Batting average	8.80
100s/50s	–/–
Top score	29
Balls bowled	3,043
Wickets	40
Bowling average	38.87
5 wickets in innings	–
10 wickets in match	–
Best bowling	4/82
Catches/stumpings	10/–
- Source: Cricinfo, 21 March 2011

Frederick Charles Gamble (29 May 1905 – 15 May 1965) was an English footballer and cricketer. Gamble was a right-handed batsman who bowled right-arm medium pace. He was born in Charing Cross, London.

Gamble originally played Minor Counties Championship cricket for the Leicestershire Second XI. He later made his first-class debut for Surrey in the 1933 County Championship against Oxford University at The Oval. Gamble played first-class cricket for Surrey from 1933 to 1935, making 19 first-class appearances, the last of which came against Oxford University. A bowler, he took 40 first-class wickets at a bowling average of 38.87, with best figures of 4/82. After being an infrequent member of the Surrey team, Gamble was relegated to the Second XI, who he played for until 1937. He later played for Devon in the 1939 Minor Counties Championship.

Prior to playing for Surrey, he had played football for Southall, Brentford, West Ham, Aldershot and Reading.

He died in Lambeth, London on 15 May 1965.
