= Freddie Fox (footballer) =

English footballer

Personal information
- Full name: Frederick Samuel Fox
- Date of birth: 22 November 1898
- Place of birth: Highworth, England
- Date of death: 15 May 1968 (aged 69)
- Place of death: High Wycombe, England
- Height: 5 ft 11 in (1.80 m)
- Position: Goalkeeper

Youth career
- Swindon Town

Senior career*
Years	Team	Apps	(Gls)
- Abertillery
1921–1922	Preston North End	3	(0)
1922–1925	Gillingham	106	(0)
1925–1927	Millwall	28	(0)
1927–1928	Halifax Town	13	(0)
1928–1931	Brentford	74	(0)
- Truro City

International career
1925	England	1	(0)
- * Club domestic league appearances and goals

Frederick Samuel Fox (22 November 1898 – 15 May 1968) was an English football goalkeeper.

He played for several clubs, including Gillingham (where he played over 100 Football League matches) and Brentford during the 1920s and 1930s, and also gained one cap for England.

In 1925 he played for England against France. He was injured and had to withdraw from the game after France's second goal on 75 minutes, but England, finishing the match with nine men, hung on to win 3–2.

Later in life, Fox served as a director at hometown club Swindon Town.
