= Annfield Plain F.C. =

Association football club in England

Annfield Plain
- Full name: Annfield Plain Association Football Club
- Nickname: Plainsmen
- Founded: 1890
- Ground: Derwent Park, Annfield Plain
- Capacity: 2,900
- Chairman: Derek Kemp
- Manager: Don Naylor
- League: Wearside League Premier Division
- 2024–25: Wearside League Premier Division, 16th of 17
Home colours	Away colours

Annfield Plain Football Club is an amateur association football club based in Annfield Plain, near Stanley, County Durham, England. The club are currently members of the Wearside League Premier Division and play at Derwent Park. They are the highest ranked club in the Stanley area, and second only to Consett A.F.C. in Derwentside.

== History ==
The first team joined the North Eastern League for the 1925–26 season and played in the league until 1964, when they joined the Wearside Football League. In 1947, they also applied to join the Football League, though due to geographical concerns, the vote was never held. The home strip of Annfield Plain is claret and blue, while the away kit is sky blue.

For many years, the club competed in the English national cup competition, the FA Cup. They first entered in the 1926–27 season and reached the first round proper, before losing 2–4 to Chilton Colliery Recreation. Annfield Plain also reached the first round in the 1928–29 and 1964–65 seasons, but were defeated by Southport on both occasions. The club also competed in the FA Trophy on three occasions between 1969 and 1976, but never progressed past the first qualifying round. In the FA Vase the team has fared slightly better, reaching the second round twice and appearing in the first round on several occasions.

In the early years of the club's existence, Annfield Plain fielded a number of players who went on to play professionally in the Football League. Examples include John Keers, who was signed by Football League Third Division North side Nelson for a fee of £150 in 1926.

== Honours ==
- Wearside Football League
  - Champions 1986–87, 1997–98

== Records ==
- FA Cup
  - First Round 1928–29, 1964–65
- FA Trophy
  - First Qualifying Round 1969–70, 1974–75
- FA Vase
  - Second Round 1976–77, 1978–79

== Former players ==
1. Players that have played/managed in the Football League or any foreign equivalent to this level (i.e. fully professional league).
2. Players with full international caps.
3. Players that hold a club record or have captained the club.

- (England) Billy Brown
- (England) Frank McDonough
- (England) Matthew Smailes
- (England) Joe Wilson
