= Harry Salt =

English footballer

Personal information
- Full name: Harry Salt
- Date of birth: 20 November 1899
- Place of birth: Ecclesfield, England
- Date of death: 1971 (aged 71–72)
- Place of death: London, England
- Positions: Wing half; outside left

Youth career
- Ecclesfield United

Senior career*
Years	Team	Apps	(Gls)
1921	Brighton & Hove Albion	6	(2)
- Mexborough Town
- Peterborough & Fletton United
1926–1927	Queens Park Rangers	5	(0)
- Grays Thurrock
1928–1929	Crystal Palace	44	(1)
1929–1932	Brentford	78	(0)
1932–1933	Walsall	10	(0)
- Yeovil & Petters United
- Tunbridge Wells Rangers
- * Club domestic league appearances and goals

Harry Salt (20 November 1899 – 1971) was an English professional footballer who played in the Football League for Brighton & Hove Albion, Queens Park Rangers, Crystal Palace, Brentford and Walsall.

== Career ==
Salt played for Brighton & Hove Albion, Mexborough Town, Peterborough & Fletton United, Queens Park Rangers, Grays Thurrock, Crystal Palace and then Brentford. Salt made 84 appearances for the "Bees" between 1929 and 1932, helping the club to finish second in the Third Division South in 1929–30. He later played for Walsall, Yeovil & Petters United and Tunbridge Wells Rangers.
