= Edward Nash (sportsman) =

English sportsman

Personal information
- Full name: Edward Montague Nash
- Born: 12 April 1902; Swindon, Wiltshire, England
- Died: 9 May 1985 (aged 83); Swindon, Wiltshire, England
- Batting: Right-handed
- Role: Wicket-keeper

Domestic team information
- Years: Team
- 1936–1937: Minor Counties
- 1923–1950: Wiltshire

Career statistics
Competition	First-class
Matches	2
Runs scored	62
Batting average	62.00
100s/50s	–/–
Top score	45*
Catches/stumpings	3/–
- Source: Cricinfo, 3 May 2012

Edward Montague Nash (12 April 1902 – 9 May 1985) was an English cricketer and footballer. In cricket, Nash was a right-handed batsman who fielded as a wicket-keeper, while in football he played as a goalkeeper. He was born at Swindon, Wiltshire and died there on 9 May 1985.

== Cricket ==
Nash made his debut in county cricket for Wiltshire in the 1923 Minor Counties Championship against the Surrey Second XI. Prior to the start of World War II in 1939, Nash made 110 appearances for Wiltshire in the Minor Counties Championship. In 1936, Nash made his first-class for a combined Minor Counties team against Oxford University at the University Parks. In a drawn match, Nash made scores of 45 not out in the Minor Counties first-innings, while in their second-innings he was dismissed for a duck by Peter Whitehouse. The following season, he made a second first-class appearance in a repeat of the previous season's fixture. Nash made scores of 9 not out in the Minor Counties first-innings, while in their second-innings he ended not out on 8. Oxford University won the match by 6 wickets. Following the war, Nash made five further appearances in the Minor Counties Championship for Wiltshire, the last of which came against the Hampshire Second XI in 1950.

== Football ==
Nash played football in his youth for Gorse Hill Boys and North End Albion. He signed for Swindon Town on a youth contract in 1916, signing a professional contract with the club four years later in 1920. Nash played for Swindon Town from the 1919/20 season to the 1929/30 season, making a total of 253 appearances in both league and cup competitions. Following the 1920/30 season, Nash left Swindon Town and signed for Brentford for the following season. Nash played for Brentford for two seasons, before moving to Crystal Palace, where he played for the club in the 1932/33 season, making a single appearance. He retired at the end of that season.
