= Billy Lane (footballer) =

English footballer and manager

Personal information
- Full name: William Henry Charles Lane
- Date of birth: 23 October 1904
- Place of birth: Tottenham, England
- Date of death: 10 November 1985 (aged 81)
- Place of death: Chelmsford, England
- Height: 5 ft 9 in (1.75 m)
- Position: Centre forward

Senior career*
Years	Team	Apps	(Gls)
- London City Mission
- Gnome Athletic
–1923	Park Avondale		
1923–1926	Tottenham Hotspur	26	(7)
1923	Summerstown		
1924	Barnet		
1924	Northfleet United		
1926–1928	Leicester City	5	(2)
1928–1929	Reading	6	(2)
1929–1932	Brentford	112	(82)
1932–1936	Watford	124	(68)
1936–1937	Bristol City	30	(11)
1937–1938	Clapton Orient	12	(1)
1938–1939	Gravesend United		
Total		315	(173)

Managerial career
- 1947–1950: Guildford City
- 1951–1961: Brighton & Hove Albion
- 1961–1963: Gravesend and Northfleet
- * Club domestic league appearances and goals

For other people of the same name, see Billy Lane, Billy Lane (angler), and Billy Lane Lauffer.

William Henry Charles Lane (23 October 1904 – 10 November 1985) was an English football centre forward, best remembered for his time in the Football League with Watford and Brentford, making over 120 appearances for each club.

== Club career ==
After playing for the London City Mission, Gnome Athletic and Park Avondale, Lane joined Tottenham Hotspur in 1922 for the first time but left the club without appearing in a senior match. He went on to play for Summerstown and Barnet before re-joining Tottenham after a spell with the club's "nursery" team Northfleet United. Lane, a centre forward, went on to feature in 36 matches and found the net on 12 occasions between 1924 and 1926. Lane's time with Spurs came to an end after manager Peter McWilliam dropped him after Lane kicked the ball into the crowd after having a goal disallowed in a match versus Preston North End. Lane had been courting the attention of the England selectors at the time, who were present at the match, but unimpressed with his behaviour. The incident ended Lane's chances of an international call-up and his Tottenham career.

After leaving White Hart Lane, Lane appeared for Leicester City (joining for £2250), Reading and Brentford, where he scored 89 goals in 123 appearances. As of 2015, his record of seven league hat-tricks is second behind club record-holder Jack Holliday and his 33-goal haul in the 1929–30 season was a club record until Holliday broke it in 1932–33. Despite his excellent form for the Bees, Lane was transfer-listed by manager Harry Curtis, who needed the money from Lane's sale to fund the transfer of Middlesbrough players Jack Holliday, Bert Watson and Billy Scott. Lane signed for Watford in a £1500 deal in 1932 and the following year scored a hat-trick in the Football League in under three minutes against Clapton Orient on 20 December 1933, then a record. He featured in a total of 136 matches for Watford in all competitions, scoring 77 goals and went on to have spells at Bristol City, Clapton Orient and finally Gravesend United.

== Managerial and coaching career ==
In 1945, Lane turned down the manager's job at Clapton Orient to return to Brentford as a coach under Harry Curtis. He remained with the Bees before going into management with Guildford City. He later moved on to manage Brighton & Hove Albion and Gravesend & Northfleet. He managed Brighton & Hove Albion to its first ever Football League title, as 1957–58 Third Division South champions. After leaving Gravesend & Northfleet, Lane became a scout for Arsenal and later returned to Brighton & Hove Albion in a similar role. He was still working for Albion at the time of his death in 1985.

== Personal life ==
Lane served as a PT instructor during the Second World War.
