= 1922 in association football =

The following are the football (soccer) events of the year 1922 throughout the world.

== Winners club national championship ==
- Belgium: Germinal Beerschot
- Denmark: Kjøbenhavns Boldklub
- England: Liverpool F.C.
- Germany: The 1922 championship was not awarded. Hamburger SV and 1. FC Nürnberg had qualified for the final and played two matches, which finished 2–2 and 1–1, both after extra time. The second match was abandoned after Nürnberg had only seven players left (eight were at the time required); initially the title was awarded to HSV (since Nürnberg had caused the abandonment), but this was revoked after an appeal by Nürnberg; another appeal by HSV followed, and at an extraordinary general meeting of the German FA they were awarded the title again, but they declined to accept it.
- Greece: 1913 to 1922 – no championship titles due to the First World War and the Greco-Turkish War of 1919–1922.
- Hungary: MTK Hungária FC
- Iceland: Fram
- Italy: U.S. Novese
- Poland: Pogoń Lwów
- Scotland: For fuller coverage, see 1921–22 in Scottish football.
  - Scottish Division One – Celtic
  - Scottish Division Two – Alloa Athletic
  - Scottish Cup – Greenock Morton

== International tournaments ==
- 1922 British Home Championship (October 22, 1921 – April 8, 1922)

Scotland

- South American Championship 1922 in Brazil (September 17, 1922 – October 22, 1922)

Brazil

== Events ==
- German association football club SV Brackel 06 is formed from the merger of two older clubs (1906 and 1909).
- The Saint Helena Football League is founded on Saint Helena.

== Births ==
- January 6 – Eusebio Tejera, Uruguayan international footballer (died 2002)
- January 8 – Charles Bumstead, English professional footballer (died 1974)
- January 14 – Miodrag Jovanović, Serbian footballer (died 2009)
- January 19 – Tommy McLain, English professional footballer (died 1995)
- January 31 – Paddy Waters, Irish soccer player (died 2004)
- February 13 – Jean Lechantre, French international footballer and coach (died 2015)
- March 3 – Nándor Hidegkuti, Hungarian footballer (died 2002)
- March 20 – Luigi Bosco, Italian professional footballer (died 2006)
- March 25 – Ted Pole, English footballer (died 2010)
- April 5 – Tom Finney, English international footballer (died 2014)
- May 7: Ingvar Rydell, Swedish international footballer (died 2013)
- June 22:
  - Osvaldo Fattori, Italian international footballer (died 2017)
  - Armando Tre Re, Italian footballer (died 2003)
- July 2: Don Kelly, English professional footballer
- July 3: Theo Brokmann Jr., Dutch footballer (died 2003)
- July 10: Fred Furniss, English club footballer (died 2017)
- July 14: Julio Cozzi, Argentine international goalkeeper (died 2011)
- July 19: Stig Sundqvist, Swedish international footballer (died 2011)
- July 30: Les Donaldson, Scottish professional footballer (died 1995)
- July 31: Mario Boyé, Argentine international footballer (died 1992)
- August 6: Stan Tolliday, English professional footballer (died 1951)
- October 8: Nils Liedholm, Swedish international footballer (died 2007)
- November 18: Agustin Gomez Pagola (died 1975)
- November 29: Raimundo Pérez Lezama, Spanish international footballer (died 2007)
- December 14: Dougald Campbell, Scottish professional footballer (died 1996)
- December 18: Ivor Broadis, English international footballer (died 2019)

== Deaths ==
- July 5 – Alfred Thompson, English club footballer (born 1891)
