= 1921–22 Football League =

30th season of the Football League

The Football League
- Season: 1921–22
- Champions: Liverpool
- New clubs in League: 20 (see tables)

The 1921–22 season was the 30th season of The Football League.

This year the Third Division was divided into North and South sections. Third Division South continued the single new Third Division of the previous season. Two new clubs were placed in Third Division South, while 18 of 20 newcomers were placed in Third Division North, as the number of Football League clubs increased from 66 to 86.

== Final league tables ==
The tables and results below are reproduced here in the exact form that they can be found at The Rec.Sport.Soccer Statistics Foundation website and in Rothmans Book of Football League Records 1888–89 to 1978–79, with home and away statistics separated.

== First Division ==
First Division
- Season: 1921–22
- Champions: Liverpool; 3rd English title
- Relegated: Bradford City; Manchester United
- Matches: 462
- Top goalscorer: Andy Wilson (31 goals)

Pos	Team	Pld	W	D	L	GF	GA	GAv	Pts	Relegation
1	Liverpool (C)	42	22	13	7	63	36	1.750	57	
2	Tottenham Hotspur	42	21	9	12	65	39	1.667	51	
3	Burnley	42	22	5	15	72	54	1.333	49	
4	Cardiff City	42	19	10	13	61	53	1.151	48	
5	Aston Villa	42	22	3	17	74	55	1.345	47	
6	Bolton Wanderers	42	20	7	15	68	59	1.153	47	
7	Newcastle United	42	18	10	14	59	45	1.311	46	
8	Middlesbrough	42	16	14	12	79	69	1.145	46	
9	Chelsea	42	17	12	13	40	43	0.930	46	
10	Manchester City	42	18	9	15	65	70	0.929	45	
11	Sheffield United	42	15	10	17	59	54	1.093	40	
12	Sunderland	42	16	8	18	60	62	0.968	40	
13	West Bromwich Albion	42	15	10	17	51	63	0.810	40	
14	Huddersfield Town	42	15	9	18	53	54	0.981	39	
15	Blackburn Rovers	42	13	12	17	54	57	0.947	38	
16	Preston North End	42	13	12	17	42	65	0.646	38	
17	Arsenal	42	15	7	20	47	56	0.839	37	
18	Birmingham	42	15	7	20	48	60	0.800	37	
19	Oldham Athletic	42	13	11	18	38	50	0.760	37	
20	Everton	42	12	12	18	57	55	1.036	36	
21	Bradford City (R)	42	11	10	21	48	72	0.667	32	Relegation to the Second Division
22	Manchester United (R)	42	8	12	22	41	73	0.562	28	Relegation to the Second Division

Source: World Football
Rules for classification: 1) Points; 2) Goal average; 3) Goals scored
(C) Champions; (R) Relegated

=== Results ===
Home \ Away	ARS	AST	BIR	BLB	BOL	BRA	BUR	CAR	CHE	EVE	HUD	LIV	MCI	MUN	MID	NEW	OLD	PNE	SHU	SUN	TOT	WBA
Arsenal		2–0	5–2	1–1	1–1	1–0	0–0	0–0	1–0	1–0	1–3	1–0	0–1	3–1	2–2	2–1	0–1	1–0	1–2	1–2	1–0	2–2
Aston Villa	2–0		1–1	1–1	2–1	7–1	2–0	2–1	1–4	2–1	2–0	1–1	4–0	3–1	6–2	1–0	2–0	2–0	5–3	2–0	2–1	0–1
Birmingham	0–1	1–0		1–0	1–1	1–0	2–3	0–1	5–1	1–1	0–2	0–2	3–1	0–1	4–3	0–4	3–0	0–2	2–1	1–0	0–3	0–2
Blackburn Rovers	0–1	1–2	1–1		1–2	3–1	3–2	1–3	1–1	2–2	2–0	0–0	3–1	3–0	2–2	0–2	3–2	3–0	2–3	1–2	1–1	2–3
Bolton Wanderers	1–0	1–0	1–2	1–1		3–3	0–1	1–2	0–2	1–0	3–1	1–3	5–0	1–0	4–2	3–2	5–1	2–2	3–1	1–1	1–0	2–0
Bradford City	0–2	3–2	1–2	1–1	4–3		0–4	1–0	0–1	3–1	4–0	0–0	1–2	2–1	0–2	2–3	3–0	1–0	1–1	0–0	0–4	1–1
Burnley	1–0	2–1	3–1	1–2	2–0	4–0		1–1	5–0	2–0	1–0	1–1	5–2	4–2	3–1	2–0	0–1	3–3	2–1	2–0	1–0	4–2
Cardiff City	4–3	0–4	3–1	1–3	1–2	6–3	4–2		2–0	2–1	0–0	2–0	0–2	3–1	3–1	1–0	0–1	3–0	1–1	2–0	0–1	2–0
Chelsea	0–2	1–0	1–2	1–0	0–3	1–0	4–1	1–0		1–0	1–0	0–1	0–0	0–0	1–1	1–1	1–0	0–0	0–2	1–0	1–2	1–1
Everton	1–1	3–2	2–1	2–0	1–0	2–0	2–0	0–1	2–3		6–2	1–1	2–2	5–0	4–1	2–3	2–2	0–0	1–1	3–0	0–0	1–2
Huddersfield Town	2–0	1–0	1–0	3–0	3–0	1–2	1–0	0–1	2–0	1–2		0–1	2–0	1–1	2–1	1–2	1–0	6–0	1–1	1–2	1–1	2–0
Liverpool	4–0	2–0	1–0	2–0	0–2	2–1	2–1	5–1	1–1	1–1	2–0		3–2	2–1	4–0	1–0	2–0	4–0	1–1	2–1	1–1	1–2
Manchester City	2–0	2–1	1–0	1–1	2–3	3–2	2–0	1–1	0–0	2–1	2–1	1–1		4–1	2–2	1–0	2–1	2–0	2–2	3–0	3–3	6–1
Manchester United	1–0	1–0	1–1	0–1	0–1	1–1	0–1	1–1	0–0	2–1	1–1	0–0	3–1		3–5	0–1	0–3	1–1	3–2	3–1	2–1	2–3
Middlesbrough	4–2	5–0	1–1	0–1	4–2	1–2	4–1	0–0	0–1	3–1	5–1	3–1	4–1	2–0		1–1	1–1	1–0	1–1	3–0	0–0	3–2
Newcastle United	3–1	1–2	0–1	2–0	2–1	1–2	2–1	0–0	1–0	3–0	1–2	1–1	5–1	3–0	0–0		1–1	3–1	2–1	2–2	0–2	3–0
Oldham Athletic	2–1	3–1	0–1	1–1	0–0	0–0	0–1	2–1	0–3	0–0	1–1	4–0	0–1	1–1	0–1	0–0		2–0	0–2	3–0	1–0	1–0
Preston North End	3–2	1–0	2–2	2–1	3–1	2–1	2–1	1–1	2–0	1–0	1–1	1–1	1–0	3–2	1–1	2–0	0–0		3–0	1–1	1–2	0–3
Sheffield United	4–1	2–3	1–2	0–1	1–0	1–0	0–1	0–2	1–2	1–0	1–1	0–1	1–0	3–0	6–1	1–1	1–0	3–0		4–1	1–0	0–0
Sunderland	1–0	1–4	2–1	3–1	6–2	0–0	3–2	4–1	1–2	1–2	2–2	3–0	2–3	2–1	1–1	0–0	5–1	1–0	1–0		2–0	5–0
Tottenham Hotspur	2–0	3–1	2–1	2–1	1–2	1–0	1–1	4–1	0–0	2–0	1–0	0–1	3–1	2–2	2–4	4–0	3–1	5–0	2–1	1–0		2–0
West Bromwich Albion	0–3	0–1	1–0	0–2	0–1	1–1	2–0	2–2	2–2	1–1	3–2	1–4	2–0	0–0	0–0	1–2	0–1	2–0	3–0	2–1	3–0	

Updated to match(es) played on unknown. Source:
Legend: Blue = home team win; Yellow = draw; Red = away team win.

=== First Division maps ===
Locations of the Football League First Division London teams
Locations of the Football League First Division teams

== Second Division ==
Football League Second Division
- Season: 1921–22
- Champions: Nottingham Forest (2nd title)
- Relegated: Bradford Park Avenue; Bristol City
- Matches: 462
- Goals: 1,061 (2.3 per match)
- Top goalscorer: Jimmy Broad (Stoke), 25

Pos	Team	Pld	W	D	L	GF	GA	GAv	Pts	Promotion or relegation
1	Nottingham Forest (C, P)	42	22	12	8	51	30	1.700	56	Promotion to the First Division
2	Stoke (P)	42	18	16	8	60	44	1.364	52	Promotion to the First Division
3	Barnsley	42	22	8	12	67	52	1.288	52	
4	West Ham United	42	20	8	14	52	39	1.333	48	
5	Hull City	42	19	10	13	51	41	1.244	48	
6	South Shields	42	17	12	13	43	38	1.132	46	
7	Fulham	42	18	9	15	57	38	1.500	45	
8	Leeds United	42	16	13	13	48	38	1.263	45	
9	Leicester City	42	14	17	11	39	34	1.147	45	
10	The Wednesday	42	15	14	13	47	50	0.940	44	
11	Bury	42	15	10	17	54	55	0.982	40	
12	Derby County	42	15	9	18	60	64	0.938	39	
13	Notts County	42	12	15	15	47	51	0.922	39	
14	Crystal Palace	42	13	13	16	45	51	0.882	39	
15	Clapton Orient	42	15	9	18	43	50	0.860	39	
16	Rotherham County	42	14	11	17	32	43	0.744	39	
17	Wolverhampton Wanderers	42	13	11	18	44	49	0.898	37	
18	Port Vale	42	14	8	20	43	57	0.754	36	
19	Blackpool	42	15	5	22	44	57	0.772	35	
20	Coventry City	42	12	10	20	51	60	0.850	34	
21	Bradford (Park Avenue) (R)	42	12	9	21	46	62	0.742	33	Relegation to the Third Division North
22	Bristol City (R)	42	12	9	21	37	58	0.638	33	Relegation to the Third Division South

(C) Champions; (P) Promoted; (R) Relegated

=== Results ===
Home \ Away	BAR	BLP	BPA	BRI	Bury	CLA	COV	CRY	DER	FUL	HUL	LEE	LEI	NOT	NTC	PTV	ROT	SSH	STK	WED	WHU	WOL
Barnsley		3–2	2–0	1–1	3–0	4–0	0–1	3–1	2–1	2–1	4–1	2–2	0–0	2–0	3–0	3–2	0–1	2–1	2–2	2–0	1–1	2–1
Blackpool	1–0		1–1	2–0	0–1	2–0	2–1	1–3	4–2	0–2	0–1	1–3	2–0	2–1	1–2	0–1	3–1	4–0	3–2	0–2	3–1	1–3
Bradford Park Avenue	2–3	0–0		2–1	1–1	3–1	1–2	0–0	5–1	1–2	1–1	0–1	0–1	1–0	2–1	2–0	4–2	1–0	2–4	2–1	2–0	0–0
Bristol City	3–0	0–1	1–0		2–0	2–1	0–2	1–2	1–2	1–0	1–0	0–0	1–1	0–1	2–2	2–1	1–2	0–1	2–0	3–1	0–1	2–0
Bury	1–2	3–0	2–2	5–0		0–0	3–2	1–2	2–0	1–0	4–0	2–1	0–1	1–2	1–0	5–2	0–0	1–0	0–1	1–2	0–1	2–1
Clapton Orient	2–1	3–0	1–0	0–1	3–1		4–0	0–0	3–2	4–2	0–2	4–2	0–0	1–2	2–1	2–0	1–2	0–1	1–0	1–1	0–0	1–0
Coventry City	0–1	0–1	2–2	1–1	1–2	1–2		1–1	1–2	2–0	2–0	1–0	0–0	0–1	4–2	4–1	4–0	0–1	0–1	2–2	2–0	3–1
Crystal Palace	0–1	1–0	1–1	1–1	4–1	1–0	1–1		3–1	2–0	0–2	1–2	1–0	4–1	1–0	0–0	2–0	1–2	0–2	2–2	1–2	1–1
Derby County	1–0	1–0	1–3	5–1	1–0	3–0	1–0	2–0		1–1	0–0	2–0	0–1	1–2	1–1	3–2	4–0	0–2	2–4	0–1	3–1	2–3
Fulham	0–0	1–0	2–1	0–0	0–1	2–0	5–0	1–1	2–2		6–0	0–1	0–0	2–0	4–0	1–0	4–0	3–0	2–1	3–1	2–0	1–0
Hull City	1–3	2–0	3–0	1–0	1–1	2–1	2–0	1–0	1–1	2–1		1–0	5–2	0–1	2–0	2–0	0–1	1–1	7–1	0–0	0–0	2–0
Leeds United	4–0	0–0	3–0	3–0	2–0	2–0	5–2	0–0	2–1	2–0	0–2		3–0	0–0	1–1	2–1	0–2	0–0	1–2	1–1	0–0	0–0
Leicester City	1–0	1–0	2–1	4–1	0–0	1–0	1–1	2–0	1–1	1–2	0–1	0–0		2–2	3–0	3–0	1–0	1–0	3–4	1–1	2–1	0–1
Nottingham Forest	1–1	0–0	4–1	1–0	1–2	2–0	1–0	2–1	3–0	0–0	3–2	1–0	0–0		0–0	1–1	1–0	1–0	3–1	2–0	2–0	0–0
Notts County	1–4	2–1	3–0	0–2	1–1	0–0	1–1	3–2	1–2	3–0	2–0	4–1	0–0	1–1		1–2	2–0	2–0	0–0	2–0	1–1	4–0
Port Vale	2–3	1–0	1–0	3–1	5–2	3–0	1–2	3–0	1–1	1–1	1–0	0–1	1–1	0–2	0–0		1–0	1–1	0–1	1–0	2–1	0–2
Rotherham County	0–0	0–1	2–0	0–0	1–1	2–0	0–0	1–1	2–0	1–0	2–0	1–0	0–0	0–1	3–0	0–1		1–1	0–0	0–0	0–1	1–0
South Shields	5–2	2–1	1–0	2–0	1–1	1–1	2–1	1–1	3–1	1–0	1–0	0–1	1–0	0–0	0–0	0–1	2–0		1–1	0–0	1–0	0–2
Stoke	1–0	1–1	0–1	3–0	1–0	0–0	2–2	5–1	1–1	3–0	0–0	3–0	1–1	1–1	0–0	0–0	1–1	2–1		1–1	2–0	3–0
The Wednesday	2–3	5–1	2–1	1–0	4–1	0–0	3–2	1–0	1–1	1–4	0–0	2–1	1–0	0–4	0–0	2–0	1–0	0–3	0–1		2–1	3–1
West Ham United	4–0	0–2	1–0	3–0	3–2	1–2	3–0	2–0	3–1	1–0	1–1	1–1	1–0	1–0	2–1	3–0	1–2	1–1	3–0	2–0		2–0
Wolverhampton Wanderers	2–0	4–0	5–0	2–2	1–1	0–2	1–0	0–1	0–3	0–0	0–2	0–0	1–1	2–0	1–2	2–0	3–1	3–2	1–1	0–0	0–1	

Updated to match(es) played on unknown. Source: Ian Laschke: Rothmans Book of Football League Records 1888–89 to 1978–79. Macdonald and Jane’s, London & Sydney, 1980.
Legend: Blue = home team win; Yellow = draw; Red = away team win.

=== Second Division maps ===
Locations of the Football League Second Division London teams
Locations of the Football League Second Division teams

== Third Division North ==
The 20 teams were sourced from:

- 1 relegated from the Football League Second Division: Stockport County
- 1 transferred from the original Third Division (South): Grimsby Town
- 6 from the Central League: Stalybridge Celtic, Nelson, Crewe Alexandra, Southport, Tranmere Rovers, Rochdale
- 4 from the North Eastern League: Ashington, Durham City, Darlington, Hartlepools United
- 3 from the Lancashire Combination: Accrington Stanley, Barrow, Wigan Borough
- 2 from the Birmingham & District League: Walsall, Wrexham
- 3 from the Midland Football League: Chesterfield, Lincoln City, Halifax Town

Football League Third Division North
- Season: 1921–22
- Champions: Stockport County (1st title)
- Failed re-election: None
- Matches: 380
- Goals: 1,150 (3.03 per match)
- Top goalscorer: Jimmy Carmichael (Grimsby Town), 37

Pos	Team	Pld	W	D	L	GF	GA	GAv	Pts	Qualification or relegation
1	Stockport County (C, P)	38	24	8	6	60	21	2.857	56	Promotion to the Second Division
2	Darlington	38	22	6	10	81	37	2.189	50	
3	Grimsby Town	38	21	8	9	72	47	1.532	50	
4	Hartlepools United	38	17	8	13	52	39	1.333	42	
5	Accrington Stanley	38	19	3	16	73	57	1.281	41	
6	Crewe Alexandra	38	18	5	15	60	56	1.071	41	
7	Stalybridge Celtic	38	18	5	15	62	63	0.984	41	
8	Walsall	38	18	3	17	66	65	1.015	39	
9	Southport	38	14	10	14	55	44	1.250	38	
10	Ashington	38	17	4	17	59	66	0.894	38	
11	Durham City	38	17	3	18	68	67	1.015	37	
12	Wrexham	38	14	9	15	51	56	0.911	37	
13	Chesterfield	38	16	3	19	48	67	0.716	35	
14	Lincoln City	38	14	6	18	48	59	0.814	34	
15	Barrow	38	14	5	19	42	54	0.778	33	
16	Nelson	38	13	7	18	48	66	0.727	33	
17	Wigan Borough	38	11	9	18	46	72	0.639	31	
18	Tranmere Rovers	38	9	11	18	51	61	0.836	29	
19	Halifax Town	38	10	9	19	56	76	0.737	29	Re-elected
20	Rochdale	38	11	4	23	52	77	0.675	26	Re-elected

Source: rsssf.com
(C) Champions; (P) Promoted

=== Results ===
Home \ Away	ACC	ASH	BRW	CHF	CRE	DAR	DUR	GRI	HAL	HAR	LIN	NEL	ROC	SOU	STL	STP	TRA	WAL	WIG	WRE
Accrington Stanley		3–0	3–0	3–1	2–0	1–0	5–1	1–0	1–2	4–1	2–0	4–1	4–0	1–2	4–1	1–3	3–0	3–3	4–0	1–0
Ashington	2–1		0–2	1–0	0–1	1–0	1–0	1–0	3–1	4–1	4–2	4–0	7–3	2–2	2–3	2–0	1–0	2–3	3–1	2–2
Barrow	3–1	2–0		1–0	1–2	0–2	0–1	2–2	1–1	0–1	2–0	0–2	1–0	2–1	2–1	0–2	2–0	3–0	2–0	5–2
Chesterfield	0–1	0–1	2–0		1–1	0–3	2–1	4–1	2–0	2–1	3–0	1–2	2–1	2–1	4–0	0–1	3–0	1–0	1–1	3–0
Crewe Alexandra	2–1	1–2	2–1	1–3		7–3	3–2	1–2	2–1	2–0	0–2	2–1	2–0	1–0	5–1	0–1	1–1	2–0	2–1	3–0
Darlington	3–0	5–0	3–0	7–0	0–1		2–2	2–0	2–0	0–0	4–2	0–1	2–1	3–0	3–0	1–0	4–0	5–0	3–0	3–0
Durham City	3–1	1–0	2–0	3–1	4–2	3–7		1–2	3–1	0–1	2–0	2–0	0–2	2–0	3–1	0–2	3–0	2–0	6–0	3–0
Grimsby Town	2–1	6–1	4–0	2–2	3–0	3–1	5–2		4–1	2–0	3–1	3–1	3–0	0–0	1–1	2–1	5–1	3–1	1–1	2–0
Halifax Town	2–1	2–0	3–2	1–2	5–5	5–1	3–2	2–0		3–0	1–2	3–1	1–1	1–1	2–3	1–0	0–2	1–3	1–2	0–0
Hartlepools United	2–1	2–1	3–1	7–0	1–0	0–0	0–1	0–0	4–0		1–1	6–1	5–3	1–0	0–1	0–0	0–0	1–0	0–0	0–1
Lincoln City	1–1	4–1	1–0	2–1	2–3	0–2	3–0	0–2	3–1	1–1		0–2	1–2	3–1	2–1	0–1	4–1	1–0	3–0	1–0
Nelson	0–1	0–2	1–1	2–0	1–2	1–1	3–5	3–0	0–0	0–4	0–0		4–1	3–2	1–0	2–2	0–0	1–0	1–2	4–0
Rochdale	6–3	2–1	0–1	0–1	2–0	0–2	1–0	0–2	3–3	0–1	0–2	2–2		0–1	2–1	0–1	2–1	7–0	4–2	3–0
Southport	1–1	0–0	1–0	3–0	2–0	3–1	1–1	7–1	3–0	3–0	0–0	0–1	2–1		5–1	2–1	1–1	3–0	1–1	1–2
Stalybridge Celtic	3–1	2–0	3–0	6–0	2–2	1–0	4–3	3–0	2–1	1–3	2–0	2–0	1–0	0–0		0–4	4–0	2–0	0–0	4–1
Stockport County	2–1	3–2	2–0	2–1	1–1	1–0	4–0	0–1	0–0	1–0	2–2	3–0	3–0	2–1	4–0		0–0	3–1	3–0	0–0
Tranmere Rovers	2–4	2–3	2–2	2–0	4–1	0–1	3–3	2–2	2–2	1–2	4–0	4–0	7–0	0–1	4–1	0–2		0–1	2–0	0–0
Walsall	6–1	6–2	3–1	2–1	1–0	0–1	2–0	2–1	4–1	3–1	3–0	2–0	4–0	4–1	2–2	0–2	2–0		4–1	2–2
Wigan Borough	0–1	1–1	1–2	1–2	2–0	3–3	2–0	1–1	4–3	1–0	3–1	1–4	3–2	3–2	0–2	0–1	0–0	4–2		2–1
Wrexham	2–1	2–0	0–0	6–1	1–0	1–1	3–1	0–1	5–1	0–2	3–1	4–2	1–1	2–0	2–0	0–0	1–3	4–0	3–2	

Legend: Blue = home team win; Yellow = draw; Red = away team win.

=== Third Division North map ===
Locations of the Football League Third Division North teams

== Third Division South ==
2 clubs were added to the new Third Division South, both from the Southern League: Charlton Athletic and Aberdare Athletic.

Football League Third Division South
- Season: 1921–22
- Champions: Southampton (1st title)
- Failed re-election: None
- Matches: 462
- Goals: 1,118 (2.42 per match)
- Top goalscorer: Frank Richardson (Plymouth Argyle), 31

Pos	Team	Pld	W	D	L	GF	GA	GAv	Pts	Qualification or relegation
1	Southampton (C, P)	42	23	15	4	68	21	3.238	61	Promotion to the Second Division
2	Plymouth Argyle	42	25	11	6	63	24	2.625	61	
3	Portsmouth	42	18	17	7	62	39	1.590	53	
4	Luton Town	42	22	8	12	64	35	1.829	52	
5	Queens Park Rangers	42	18	13	11	53	44	1.205	49	
6	Swindon Town	42	16	13	13	72	60	1.200	45	
7	Watford	42	13	18	11	54	48	1.125	44	
8	Aberdare Athletic	42	17	10	15	57	51	1.118	44	
9	Brentford	42	16	11	15	52	43	1.209	43	
10	Swansea Town	42	13	15	14	50	47	1.064	41	
11	Merthyr Town	42	17	6	19	45	56	0.804	40	
12	Millwall	42	10	18	14	38	42	0.905	38	
13	Reading	42	14	10	18	40	47	0.851	38	
14	Bristol Rovers	42	14	10	18	52	67	0.776	38	
15	Norwich City	42	12	13	17	50	62	0.806	37	
16	Charlton Athletic	42	13	11	18	43	56	0.768	37	
17	Northampton Town	42	13	11	18	47	71	0.662	37	
18	Gillingham	42	14	8	20	47	60	0.783	36	
19	Brighton & Hove Albion	42	13	9	20	45	51	0.882	35	
20	Newport County	42	11	12	19	44	61	0.721	34	
21	Exeter City	42	11	12	19	38	59	0.644	34	Re-elected
22	Southend United	42	8	11	23	34	74	0.459	27	Re-elected

(C) Champions; (P) Promoted

=== Results ===
Home \ Away	ADE	BRE	B&HA	BRR	CHA	EXE	GIL	LUT	MER	MIL	NPC	NOR	NWC	PLY	POR	QPR	REA	SOU	STD	SWA	SWI	WAT
Aberdare Athletic		2–0	2–0	2–0	3–3	0–2	6–1	2–0	0–0	0–0	3–0	4–2	1–2	0–0	0–0	4–2	0–1	0–1	1–1	2–1	3–2	3–0
Brentford	2–1		4–0	4–2	0–2	5–2	0–1	0–2	0–1	1–0	1–0	1–0	2–1	3–1	2–2	5–1	2–0	1–0	1–0	3–0	3–0	1–1
Brighton & Hove Albion	1–2	2–1		3–1	2–0	3–1	0–1	1–1	1–3	0–1	3–0	7–0	0–2	1–1	3–0	2–1	1–1	0–1	0–0	0–0	2–1	1–1
Bristol Rovers	5–1	0–0	1–2		4–2	1–3	0–3	2–0	2–0	0–0	3–4	2–0	4–2	1–3	1–1	1–1	2–0	0–0	1–0	0–0	1–1	1–1
Charlton Athletic	2–1	1–1	1–0	2–0		1–0	0–0	0–1	1–0	2–1	1–1	2–2	2–1	0–0	1–2	1–1	0–1	1–2	4–0	1–0	4–5	1–0
Exeter City	0–1	1–0	0–3	2–2	1–0		1–1	0–1	1–0	1–0	2–2	2–0	2–0	0–2	1–4	0–1	1–3	0–0	4–1	1–1	1–4	1–3
Gillingham	3–1	0–0	1–0	3–2	2–0	3–0		0–1	5–0	0–1	0–2	3–2	5–2	1–2	1–2	1–2	2–0	2–0	1–0	0–0	2–2	1–1
Luton Town	1–2	3–0	2–0	1–2	2–0	4–0	7–0		3–0	1–0	4–0	3–0	2–1	1–0	1–0	3–1	0–1	0–0	3–0	3–0	2–1	1–1
Merthyr Town	0–1	2–0	2–1	0–2	1–0	0–0	2–0	2–0		3–1	2–1	2–1	3–0	0–1	2–1	2–0	2–0	0–1	2–2	1–0	4–1	1–2
Millwall	0–0	1–1	2–0	4–1	0–1	1–0	1–0	1–1	4–0		1–1	0–0	2–2	1–1	1–1	0–0	3–0	0–1	0–0	0–0	0–0	0–0
Newport County	1–0	2–1	0–1	0–1	2–1	1–1	1–1	2–2	0–2	1–0		2–2	1–0	0–0	0–0	0–1	1–0	0–1	2–1	2–3	4–0	0–0
Northampton Town	2–0	2–0	2–0	2–2	1–0	2–3	3–1	2–0	2–0	0–3	2–0		3–0	1–3	0–0	1–0	2–1	0–0	0–2	0–1	2–1	1–0
Norwich City	0–0	0–0	1–1	0–1	2–0	0–0	2–0	0–1	2–0	3–1	2–2	2–0		1–1	2–1	0–0	4–1	2–2	1–1	3–2	1–2	1–1
Plymouth Argyle	3–0	4–1	3–1	1–0	3–0	0–0	3–0	2–0	0–0	2–0	1–0	2–0	1–1		0–0	4–0	2–0	1–0	4–0	3–1	1–0	3–0
Portsmouth	2–2	1–0	0–0	1–0	1–0	2–0	4–1	1–1	2–1	2–2	4–3	1–1	0–1	3–1		1–0	1–0	0–2	6–0	3–0	1–3	2–0
Queens Park Rangers	1–0	1–1	3–0	1–2	3–1	2–1	1–0	1–0	0–0	6–1	2–1	4–0	2–0	2–0	1–1		1–1	2–2	1–0	1–0	0–0	1–1
Reading	0–1	0–3	0–0	4–0	1–2	0–0	2–1	2–1	5–0	1–0	1–0	0–0	2–1	0–1	1–1	0–1		0–1	4–0	2–0	1–1	2–1
Southampton	1–0	0–0	3–0	1–0	6–0	2–0	2–0	2–1	1–1	4–2	5–0	8–0	2–0	0–0	1–1	1–1	0–0		5–0	1–1	3–1	2–0
Southend United	3–2	1–1	1–2	3–0	1–1	0–1	2–0	0–1	2–1	1–1	0–1	1–1	0–1	1–0	1–2	1–2	2–0	0–0		1–0	1–2	1–4
Swansea Town	1–2	1–0	2–1	8–1	0–0	2–1	2–0	1–1	3–2	3–0	2–2	2–2	1–1	3–0	2–2	1–0	0–0	1–0	1–1		1–3	3–0
Swindon Town	2–2	2–1	1–0	0–1	0–0	1–1	0–0	1–1	3–0	1–1	3–2	4–2	6–1	1–2	0–0	2–0	4–0	2–3	6–1	1–0		0–3
Watford	3–0	0–0	1–0	1–0	2–2	0–0	1–0	4–1	4–1	0–1	1–0	2–2	4–2	0–1	0–3	2–2	2–2	1–1	4–1	0–0	2–2	

Updated to match(es) played on unknown. Source: Ian Laschke: Rothmans Book of Football League Records 1888–89 to 1978–79. Macdonald and Jane’s, London & Sydney, 1980.
Legend: Blue = home team win; Yellow = draw; Red = away team win.

=== Maps ===
Locations of the Football League Third Division South London teams
Locations of the Football League Third Division South teams

== Attendances ==
=== Division One ===
No.	Club	Average
1	Chelsea FC	37,545
2	Tottenham Hotspur FC	36,485
3	Liverpool FC	36,105
4	Newcastle United FC	34,860
5	Cardiff City FC	32,760
6	Aston Villa FC	31,700
7	Everton FC	31,175
8	Arsenal FC	29,170
9	Manchester United	28,510
10	Birmingham City FC	26,875
11	Sheffield United FC	25,445
12	Bolton Wanderers FC	25,295
13	Manchester City FC	24,200
14	Sunderland AFC	24,150
15	Burnley FC	23,640
16	Blackburn Rovers FC	23,580
17	Middlesbrough FC	23,230
18	West Bromwich Albion FC	22,490
19	Bradford City AFC	21,815
20	Preston North End FC	20,490
21	Huddersfield Town AFC	17,870
22	Oldham Athletic FC	16,680

== See also ==
- 1921 in association football
- 1922 in association football
