= Tolliday =

Tolliday is a surname. Notable people with the surname include:

- Steven W. Tolliday, professor of economic and social history at the University of Leeds
- John Tolliday (born 1947), English cricketer
- Stan Tolliday (1922–1951), English professional footballer
