= Alfred Thompson =

Alfred Thompson may refer to:

- Alfred Thompson (Yukon politician) (1869–1940), Canadian physician and politician in the Yukon
- Alfred Burke Thompson (1862–1942), Ontario barrister and political figure
- Alfred Thompson (footballer, died 1922) (1891–1922), English footballer (Grimsby Town)
- Alfred Thompson (footballer, born 1891) (1891–1969), English footballer (Brentford FC)
- Alfred Thompson (librettist) (1831–1895), British musical theatre librettist
- Alfred B. Thompson (1916–1985), member of the Royal Canadian Air Force
- Alfred Hill Thompson (1839–1874), English architect
- Alfred Wordsworth Thompson (1840–1896), American landscape and history painter
- Stan Thompson (Alfred Stanley Thompson, 1908–1980), English professional footballer
