= Paddy Waters =

Paddy Waters may refer to:

- Paddy Waters (footballer), Irish soccer player
- Paddy Waters (hurler), Irish hurler
