= 1922–23 Football League =

31st season of the Football League

The Football League
- Season: 1922–23
- Champions: Liverpool
- Resigned: Stalybridge Celtic

The 1922–23 season was the 31st season of The Football League.

== Final league tables ==
The tables and results below are reproduced here in the exact form that they can be found at The Rec.Sport.Soccer Statistics Foundation website and in Rothmans Book of Football League Records 1888–89 to 1978–79, with home and away statistics separated.

Beginning with the season 1894–95, clubs finishing level on points were separated according to goal average (goals scored divided by goals conceded), or more properly put, goal ratio. In case one or more teams had the same goal difference, this system favoured those teams who had scored fewer goals. The goal average system was eventually scrapped beginning with the 1976–77 season. From the 1922–23 season on, Re-election was required of the bottom two teams of both Third Division North and Third Division South.

== First Division ==
First Division
- Season: 1922–23
- Champions: Liverpool; 4th English title
- Relegated: Stoke; Oldham Athletic
- Matches: 462
- Goals: 1,215 (2.63 per match)
- Top goalscorer: Charlie Buchan (30 goals)
- Biggest home win: Burnley 8–2 Nottingham Forest (4 November 1922); Aston Villa 6–0 Stoke (17 February 1923); Sheffield United 7–1 Birmingham (17 February 1923)
- Biggest away win: Blackburn Rovers 0–5 Arsenal (1 January 1923)
- Highest scoring: Burnley 8–2 Nottingham Forest (4 November 1922)

| Pos | Team | Pld | W | D | L | GF | GA | GAv | Pts | Relegation |
|---|---|---|---|---|---|---|---|---|---|---|
| 1 | Liverpool (C) | 42 | 26 | 8 | 8 | 70 | 31 | 2.258 | 60 | |
| 2 | Sunderland | 42 | 22 | 10 | 10 | 72 | 54 | 1.333 | 54 | |
| 3 | Huddersfield Town | 42 | 21 | 11 | 10 | 60 | 32 | 1.875 | 53 | |
| 4 | Newcastle United | 42 | 18 | 12 | 12 | 45 | 37 | 1.216 | 48 | |
| 5 | Everton | 42 | 20 | 7 | 15 | 63 | 59 | 1.068 | 47 | |
| 6 | Aston Villa | 42 | 18 | 10 | 14 | 64 | 51 | 1.255 | 46 | |
| 7 | West Bromwich Albion | 42 | 17 | 11 | 14 | 58 | 49 | 1.184 | 45 | |
| 8 | Manchester City | 42 | 17 | 11 | 14 | 50 | 49 | 1.020 | 45 | |
| 9 | Cardiff City | 42 | 18 | 7 | 17 | 73 | 59 | 1.237 | 43 | |
| 10 | Sheffield United | 42 | 16 | 10 | 16 | 68 | 64 | 1.063 | 42 | |
| 11 | Arsenal | 42 | 16 | 10 | 16 | 61 | 62 | 0.984 | 42 | |
| 12 | Tottenham Hotspur | 42 | 17 | 7 | 18 | 50 | 50 | 1.000 | 41 | |
| 13 | Bolton Wanderers | 42 | 14 | 12 | 16 | 50 | 58 | 0.862 | 40 | |
| 14 | Blackburn Rovers | 42 | 14 | 12 | 16 | 47 | 62 | 0.758 | 40 | |
| 15 | Burnley | 42 | 16 | 6 | 20 | 58 | 59 | 0.983 | 38 | |
| 16 | Preston North End | 42 | 13 | 11 | 18 | 60 | 64 | 0.938 | 37 | |
| 17 | Birmingham | 42 | 13 | 11 | 18 | 41 | 57 | 0.719 | 37 | |
| 18 | Middlesbrough | 42 | 13 | 10 | 19 | 57 | 63 | 0.905 | 36 | |
| 19 | Chelsea | 42 | 9 | 18 | 15 | 45 | 53 | 0.849 | 36 | |
| 20 | Nottingham Forest | 42 | 13 | 8 | 21 | 41 | 70 | 0.586 | 34 | |
| 21 | Stoke (R) | 42 | 10 | 10 | 22 | 47 | 67 | 0.701 | 30 | Relegation to the Second Division |
| 22 | Oldham Athletic (R) | 42 | 10 | 10 | 22 | 35 | 65 | 0.538 | 30 | Relegation to the Second Division |

Source: World Football
Rules for classification: 1) Points; 2) Goal average; 3) Goals scored
(C) Champions; (R) Relegated

=== Results ===
| Home \ Away | ARS | AST | BIR | BLB | BOL | BUR | CAR | CHE | EVE | HUD | LIV | MCI | MID | NEW | NOT | OLD | PNE | SHU | STK | SUN | TOT | WBA |
|---|---|---|---|---|---|---|---|---|---|---|---|---|---|---|---|---|---|---|---|---|---|---|
| Arsenal | | 2–0 | 1–0 | 1–1 | 5–0 | 1–1 | 2–1 | 3–1 | 1–2 | 1–1 | 1–0 | 1–0 | 3–0 | 1–2 | 2–0 | 2–0 | 1–1 | 2–0 | 3–0 | 2–3 | 0–2 | 3–1 |
| Aston Villa | 1–1 | | 3–0 | 2–0 | 2–0 | 3–1 | 1–3 | 1–0 | 3–0 | 2–1 | 0–1 | 2–0 | 2–2 | 1–1 | 4–0 | 3–0 | 1–0 | 0–1 | 6–0 | 1–0 | 2–0 | 2–0 |
| Birmingham | 3–2 | 1–0 | | 1–1 | 2–0 | 1–0 | 0–0 | 0–1 | 1–1 | 0–0 | 0–1 | 0–1 | 2–0 | 0–2 | 2–0 | 2–3 | 1–0 | 4–2 | 2–0 | 1–2 | 2–1 | 0–2 |
| Blackburn Rovers | 0–5 | 4–2 | 1–1 | | 1–0 | 2–1 | 3–1 | 0–0 | 5–1 | 0–0 | 1–0 | 0–0 | 2–0 | 1–1 | 2–0 | 1–0 | 1–1 | 1–0 | 1–5 | 0–0 | 1–0 | 5–1 |
| Bolton Wanderers | 4–1 | 3–0 | 3–0 | 3–0 | | 2–1 | 0–0 | 1–1 | 0–2 | 1–0 | 1–1 | 2–1 | 1–1 | 1–0 | 4–2 | 3–1 | 1–1 | 1–1 | 1–1 | 1–1 | 0–2 | 3–0 |
| Burnley | 4–1 | 1–1 | 0–2 | 3–1 | 2–1 | | 1–5 | 1–0 | 0–1 | 0–2 | 2–0 | 2–0 | 3–0 | 0–0 | 8–2 | 1–1 | 2–0 | 1–4 | 3–2 | 2–0 | 0–1 | 3–0 |
| Cardiff City | 4–1 | 3–0 | 1–1 | 5–0 | 1–0 | 2–2 | | 6–1 | 0–2 | 0–1 | 3–0 | 3–1 | 2–0 | 5–0 | 3–1 | 2–0 | 1–0 | 1–0 | 2–1 | 2–4 | 2–3 | 3–0 |
| Chelsea | 0–0 | 1–1 | 1–1 | 1–1 | 3–0 | 0–1 | 1–1 | | 3–1 | 2–2 | 0–0 | 1–1 | 1–1 | 3–0 | 2–2 | 4–0 | 0–1 | 0–0 | 3–2 | 1–3 | 0–0 | 2–2 |
| Everton | 1–0 | 2–1 | 2–1 | 2–0 | 1–1 | 1–0 | 3–1 | 3–1 | | 0–3 | 0–1 | 0–0 | 5–3 | 3–2 | 4–2 | 0–0 | 1–0 | 5–1 | 4–0 | 1–1 | 3–1 | 0–1 |
| Huddersfield Town | 4–0 | 3–5 | 4–0 | 0–2 | 0–2 | 2–0 | 1–0 | 3–0 | 1–0 | | 0–0 | 0–0 | 0–2 | 2–0 | 2–1 | 3–0 | 2–0 | 2–1 | 1–0 | 0–1 | 1–0 | 4–1 |
| Liverpool | 5–2 | 3–0 | 0–0 | 3–0 | 3–0 | 3–0 | 3–1 | 1–0 | 5–1 | 1–1 | | 2–0 | 2–0 | 0–2 | 2–1 | 2–1 | 5–2 | 2–1 | 1–0 | 5–1 | 0–0 | 2–0 |
| Manchester City | 0–0 | 1–1 | 0–1 | 2–1 | 2–0 | 1–0 | 5–1 | 3–0 | 2–1 | 3–1 | 1–0 | | 2–1 | 0–0 | 1–1 | 3–2 | 2–1 | 3–3 | 2–1 | 1–0 | 3–0 | 1–1 |
| Middlesbrough | 2–0 | 2–2 | 2–1 | 1–2 | 1–2 | 4–1 | 0–1 | 2–1 | 2–4 | 2–2 | 0–2 | 5–0 | | 1–1 | 4–0 | 2–1 | 1–1 | 3–2 | 3–1 | 2–0 | 2–0 | 0–1 |
| Newcastle United | 1–1 | 0–0 | 0–0 | 5–1 | 1–0 | 0–2 | 3–1 | 0–0 | 2–0 | 1–0 | 0–1 | 3–1 | 1–1 | | 1–0 | 1–0 | 3–1 | 3–0 | 1–0 | 2–1 | 1–1 | 2–0 |
| Nottingham Forest | 2–1 | 3–1 | 1–1 | 1–0 | 1–1 | 1–0 | 3–2 | 0–4 | 2–1 | 0–1 | 1–3 | 2–0 | 2–1 | 0–1 | | 1–0 | 3–0 | 1–0 | 0–1 | 1–0 | 0–1 | 0–4 |
| Oldham Athletic | 0–0 | 0–2 | 2–0 | 1–0 | 3–1 | 1–1 | 3–1 | 2–0 | 1–0 | 0–3 | 0–2 | 0–3 | 0–0 | 0–0 | 2–0 | | 2–1 | 0–2 | 4–1 | 0–0 | 0–3 | 0–0 |
| Preston North End | 1–2 | 3–2 | 2–3 | 1–0 | 3–1 | 3–1 | 3–0 | 2–0 | 2–2 | 1–0 | 1–3 | 0–2 | 1–2 | 1–0 | 2–2 | 5–1 | | 2–3 | 4–2 | 2–0 | 2–0 | 0–0 |
| Sheffield United | 2–1 | 1–1 | 7–1 | 1–1 | 2–2 | 2–1 | 0–0 | 0–2 | 0–1 | 0–2 | 4–1 | 2–0 | 4–1 | 2–0 | 0–0 | 2–2 | 2–2 | | 2–0 | 3–1 | 2–0 | 3–1 |
| Stoke | 1–0 | 1–1 | 0–0 | 1–1 | 2–0 | 0–1 | 3–1 | 1–2 | 4–1 | 2–2 | 0–0 | 1–1 | 0–0 | 1–0 | 0–1 | 2–2 | 4–2 | 4–0 | | 1–2 | 0–0 | 0–2 |
| Sunderland | 3–3 | 2–0 | 5–3 | 4–3 | 5–1 | 3–1 | 2–1 | 1–1 | 3–1 | 1–1 | 1–0 | 2–0 | 2–1 | 2–0 | 0–0 | 2–0 | 2–2 | 3–5 | 2–0 | | 2–0 | 3–2 |
| Tottenham Hotspur | 1–2 | 1–2 | 2–0 | 2–0 | 0–1 | 1–3 | 1–1 | 3–1 | 2–0 | 0–0 | 2–4 | 3–1 | 2–0 | 0–1 | 2–1 | 3–0 | 1–1 | 2–1 | 3–1 | 0–1 | | 3–1 |
| West Bromwich Albion | 7–0 | 3–0 | 1–0 | 3–0 | 1–1 | 2–1 | 3–0 | 0–0 | 0–0 | 0–2 | 0–0 | 2–0 | 1–0 | 2–1 | 0–0 | 1–0 | 2–2 | 4–0 | 0–1 | 1–1 | 5–1 | |

Legend: Blue = home team win; Yellow = draw; Red = away team win.

=== Maps ===
Locations of the Football League First Division teams
Locations of the Football League First Division London teams

== Second Division ==
Football League Second Division
- Season: 1922–23
- Champions: Notts County (3rd title)
- Relegated: Rotherham County; Wolverhampton Wanderers
- Matches: 462
- Goals: 1,055 (2.28 per match)
- Top goalscorer: Harry Bedford (Blackpool), 32
- Biggest home win: Leicester City – Wolverhampton Wanderers 7–0 (10 Mar 1923)
- Biggest away win: Leicester City – West Ham United 0–6 (15 Feb 1923)
- Highest scoring: Stockport County – Leicester City 4–5 (26 Apr 1923)

| Pos | Team | Pld | W | D | L | GF | GA | GAv | Pts | Promotion or relegation |
|---|---|---|---|---|---|---|---|---|---|---|
| 1 | Notts County (C, P) | 42 | 23 | 7 | 12 | 46 | 34 | 1.353 | 53 | Promotion to the First Division |
| 2 | West Ham United (P) | 42 | 20 | 11 | 11 | 63 | 38 | 1.658 | 51 | Promotion to the First Division |
| 3 | Leicester City | 42 | 21 | 9 | 12 | 65 | 44 | 1.477 | 51 | |
| 4 | Manchester United | 42 | 17 | 14 | 11 | 51 | 36 | 1.417 | 48 | |
| 5 | Blackpool | 42 | 18 | 11 | 13 | 60 | 43 | 1.395 | 47 | |
| 6 | Bury | 42 | 18 | 11 | 13 | 55 | 46 | 1.196 | 47 | |
| 7 | Leeds United | 42 | 18 | 11 | 13 | 43 | 36 | 1.194 | 47 | |
| 8 | The Wednesday | 42 | 17 | 12 | 13 | 54 | 47 | 1.149 | 46 | |
| 9 | Barnsley | 42 | 17 | 11 | 14 | 62 | 51 | 1.216 | 45 | |
| 10 | Fulham | 42 | 16 | 12 | 14 | 43 | 32 | 1.344 | 44 | |
| 11 | Southampton | 42 | 14 | 14 | 14 | 40 | 40 | 1.000 | 42 | |
| 12 | Hull City | 42 | 14 | 14 | 14 | 43 | 45 | 0.956 | 42 | |
| 13 | South Shields | 42 | 15 | 10 | 17 | 35 | 44 | 0.795 | 40 | |
| 14 | Derby County | 42 | 14 | 11 | 17 | 46 | 50 | 0.920 | 39 | |
| 15 | Bradford City | 42 | 12 | 13 | 17 | 41 | 45 | 0.911 | 37 | |
| 16 | Crystal Palace | 42 | 13 | 11 | 18 | 54 | 62 | 0.871 | 37 | |
| 17 | Port Vale | 42 | 14 | 9 | 19 | 39 | 51 | 0.765 | 37 | |
| 18 | Coventry City | 42 | 15 | 7 | 20 | 46 | 63 | 0.730 | 37 | |
| 19 | Clapton Orient | 42 | 12 | 12 | 18 | 40 | 50 | 0.800 | 36 | |
| 20 | Stockport County | 42 | 14 | 8 | 20 | 43 | 58 | 0.741 | 36 | |
| 21 | Rotherham County (R) | 42 | 13 | 9 | 20 | 44 | 63 | 0.698 | 35 | Relegation to the Third Division North |
| 22 | Wolverhampton Wanderers (R) | 42 | 9 | 9 | 24 | 42 | 77 | 0.545 | 27 | Relegation to the Third Division North |

(C) Champions; (P) Promoted; (R) Relegated

=== Results ===
| Home \ Away | BAR | BLP | BRA | Bury | CLA | COV | CRY | DER | FUL | HUL | LEE | LEI | MUN | NTC | PTV | ROT | SOU | SSH | STP | WED | WHU | WOL |
|---|---|---|---|---|---|---|---|---|---|---|---|---|---|---|---|---|---|---|---|---|---|---|
| Barnsley | | 2–2 | 3–1 | 2–1 | 2–1 | 6–2 | 1–2 | 5–0 | 0–1 | 1–0 | 1–0 | 0–1 | 2–2 | 1–0 | 0–1 | 2–2 | 3–0 | 5–0 | 1–1 | 2–4 | 2–0 | 1–0 |
| Blackpool | 0–1 | | 3–0 | 5–1 | 0–0 | 0–1 | 4–0 | 3–2 | 3–0 | 0–0 | 1–0 | 1–2 | 1–0 | 1–1 | 0–2 | 1–0 | 1–2 | 3–0 | 0–0 | 3–0 | 4–1 | 3–1 |
| Bradford City | 2–0 | 0–2 | | 4–0 | 1–2 | 4–0 | 1–1 | 0–0 | 2–1 | 2–1 | 0–2 | 2–2 | 1–1 | 1–2 | 2–0 | 0–1 | 0–0 | 1–0 | 2–0 | 1–1 | 0–1 | 1–1 |
| Bury | 2–1 | 3–0 | 1–0 | | 5–1 | 1–1 | 2–1 | 4–1 | 0–1 | 1–0 | 1–1 | 2–0 | 2–2 | 2–2 | 2–0 | 1–0 | 0–0 | 1–0 | 2–0 | 4–0 | 2–5 | 3–0 |
| Clapton Orient | 0–1 | 0–1 | 1–0 | 0–2 | | 0–0 | 3–1 | 0–0 | 0–2 | 2–0 | 3–0 | 2–0 | 1–1 | 2–1 | 0–0 | 5–1 | 1–0 | 0–0 | 0–2 | 2–2 | 0–2 | 4–1 |
| Coventry City | 3–0 | 1–2 | 2–1 | 3–0 | 2–1 | | 2–1 | 1–0 | 1–0 | 0–1 | 1–2 | 1–1 | 2–0 | 1–2 | 1–2 | 2–1 | 2–0 | 0–2 | 1–0 | 1–1 | 1–3 | 7–1 |
| Crystal Palace | 2–0 | 1–1 | 2–0 | 1–1 | 2–0 | 0–0 | | 2–2 | 0–0 | 1–1 | 1–0 | 0–1 | 2–3 | 0–1 | 2–0 | 4–0 | 1–0 | 1–1 | 3–0 | 2–0 | 1–5 | 5–0 |
| Derby County | 0–1 | 1–0 | 0–2 | 1–0 | 0–0 | 4–0 | 6–0 | | 2–0 | 0–2 | 0–1 | 2–0 | 1–1 | 0–0 | 1–2 | 1–0 | 0–2 | 1–0 | 1–2 | 1–1 | 2–1 | 1–1 |
| Fulham | 0–1 | 1–1 | 0–0 | 3–0 | 0–0 | 4–0 | 2–1 | 3–1 | | 0–0 | 3–0 | 2–0 | 0–0 | 2–1 | 1–1 | 1–2 | 1–1 | 0–1 | 3–0 | 1–0 | 0–2 | 2–0 |
| Hull City | 2–1 | 0–0 | 0–0 | 2–2 | 2–1 | 1–1 | 1–1 | 4–2 | 1–0 | | 3–1 | 1–3 | 2–1 | 0–2 | 3–0 | 2–3 | 1–3 | 2–0 | 1–0 | 0–0 | 1–1 | 0–0 |
| Leeds United | 1–1 | 1–1 | 1–0 | 0–0 | 0–0 | 1–0 | 4–1 | 1–0 | 1–1 | 2–2 | | 0–0 | 0–1 | 3–0 | 2–1 | 2–0 | 1–0 | 0–1 | 2–0 | 0–0 | 3–1 | 1–0 |
| Leicester City | 2–2 | 1–2 | 2–0 | 2–0 | 2–0 | 2–1 | 3–0 | 0–1 | 1–1 | 0–1 | 2–1 | | 0–1 | 2–1 | 3–0 | 3–0 | 2–1 | 3–0 | 2–0 | 3–1 | 0–6 | 7–0 |
| Manchester United | 1–0 | 2–1 | 1–1 | 0–1 | 0–0 | 2–1 | 2–1 | 0–0 | 1–1 | 3–2 | 0–0 | 0–2 | | 1–1 | 1–2 | 3–0 | 1–2 | 3–0 | 1–0 | 1–0 | 1–2 | 1–0 |
| Notts County | 1–0 | 2–0 | 0–0 | 1–0 | 3–1 | 2–0 | 0–4 | 1–2 | 1–0 | 0–1 | 1–0 | 1–0 | 1–6 | | 1–0 | 2–0 | 1–0 | 2–0 | 2–0 | 1–0 | 2–0 | 4–1 |
| Port Vale | 1–1 | 2–0 | 1–2 | 2–0 | 3–1 | 0–1 | 2–0 | 2–3 | 0–1 | 1–0 | 1–2 | 0–0 | 1–0 | 0–0 | | 0–0 | 0–0 | 3–0 | 0–2 | 2–2 | 1–3 | 1–0 |
| Rotherham County | 1–1 | 1–0 | 0–2 | 0–0 | 0–0 | 2–0 | 4–1 | 3–0 | 1–3 | 0–1 | 3–1 | 0–0 | 1–1 | 1–0 | 3–1 | | 0–0 | 2–1 | 2–1 | 1–2 | 2–2 | 3–2 |
| Southampton | 2–2 | 1–1 | 2–0 | 0–3 | 2–0 | 3–0 | 0–2 | 0–4 | 2–0 | 2–1 | 0–1 | 0–0 | 0–0 | 0–1 | 3–1 | 4–2 | | 0–2 | 1–0 | 1–1 | 2–0 | 3–0 |
| South Shields | 2–0 | 1–0 | 0–0 | 0–2 | 3–0 | 0–0 | 2–0 | 3–1 | 2–0 | 0–0 | 0–2 | 2–1 | 0–3 | 1–0 | 3–1 | 2–0 | 0–0 | | 3–0 | 1–1 | 0–0 | 1–1 |
| Stockport County | 3–1 | 2–2 | 1–0 | 1–0 | 0–2 | 5–1 | 2–2 | 2–1 | 0–2 | 1–1 | 2–1 | 4–5 | 1–0 | 0–0 | 0–2 | 1–0 | 3–0 | 1–1 | | 0–1 | 2–1 | 1–1 |
| The Wednesday | 2–3 | 2–3 | 2–2 | 2–0 | 4–1 | 3–0 | 3–1 | 0–0 | 1–0 | 1–0 | 3–1 | 2–1 | 1–0 | 0–1 | 2–0 | 1–0 | 0–0 | 2–0 | 4–1 | | 0–2 | 1–0 |
| West Ham United | 0–0 | 2–0 | 1–2 | 0–0 | 1–0 | 1–0 | 1–1 | 0–0 | 1–0 | 3–0 | 0–0 | 2–2 | 0–2 | 0–1 | 0–0 | 4–0 | 1–1 | 1–0 | 0–1 | 2–1 | | 1–0 |
| Wolverhampton Wanderers | 3–3 | 3–4 | 4–1 | 1–1 | 1–3 | 1–2 | 1–0 | 0–1 | 0–0 | 3–0 | 0–1 | 1–2 | 0–1 | 1–0 | 3–0 | 3–2 | 0–0 | 1–0 | 3–1 | 2–0 | 1–4 | |

Source: Ian Laschke: Rothmans Book of Football League Records 1888–89 to 1978–79. Macdonald and Jane’s, London & Sydney, 1980.
Legend: Blue = home team win; Yellow = draw; Red = away team win.

=== Maps ===
Locations of the Football League Second Division teams
Locations of the Football League Second Division London teams

== Third Division North ==
Football League Third Division North
- Season: 1922–23
- Champions: Nelson (1st title)
- Failed re-election: None
- Matches: 380
- Goals: 1,019 (2.68 per match)
- Top goalscorer: George Beel (Chesterfield), 23; Jimmy Carmichael (Grimsby Town), 23

| Pos | Team | Pld | W | D | L | GF | GA | GAv | Pts | Promotion or relegation |
|---|---|---|---|---|---|---|---|---|---|---|
| 1 | Nelson (C, P) | 38 | 24 | 3 | 11 | 61 | 41 | 1.488 | 51 | Promotion to the Second Division |
| 2 | Bradford (Park Avenue) | 38 | 19 | 9 | 10 | 67 | 38 | 1.763 | 47 | |
| 3 | Walsall | 38 | 19 | 8 | 11 | 51 | 44 | 1.159 | 46 | |
| 4 | Chesterfield | 38 | 19 | 7 | 12 | 68 | 52 | 1.308 | 45 | |
| 5 | Wigan Borough | 38 | 18 | 8 | 12 | 64 | 39 | 1.641 | 44 | |
| 6 | Crewe Alexandra | 38 | 17 | 9 | 12 | 48 | 38 | 1.263 | 43 | |
| 7 | Halifax Town | 38 | 17 | 7 | 14 | 53 | 46 | 1.152 | 41 | |
| 8 | Accrington Stanley | 38 | 17 | 7 | 14 | 59 | 65 | 0.908 | 41 | |
| 9 | Darlington | 38 | 15 | 10 | 13 | 59 | 46 | 1.283 | 40 | |
| 10 | Wrexham | 38 | 14 | 10 | 14 | 38 | 48 | 0.792 | 38 | |
| 11 | Stalybridge Celtic (R) | 38 | 15 | 6 | 17 | 42 | 47 | 0.894 | 36 | Resigned from the league |
| 12 | Rochdale | 38 | 13 | 10 | 15 | 42 | 53 | 0.792 | 36 | |
| 13 | Lincoln City | 38 | 13 | 10 | 15 | 39 | 55 | 0.709 | 36 | |
| 14 | Grimsby Town | 38 | 14 | 5 | 19 | 55 | 52 | 1.058 | 33 | |
| 15 | Hartlepools United | 38 | 10 | 12 | 16 | 48 | 54 | 0.889 | 32 | |
| 16 | Tranmere Rovers | 38 | 12 | 8 | 18 | 49 | 59 | 0.831 | 32 | |
| 17 | Southport | 38 | 12 | 7 | 19 | 32 | 46 | 0.696 | 31 | |
| 18 | Barrow | 38 | 13 | 4 | 21 | 50 | 60 | 0.833 | 30 | |
| 19 | Ashington | 38 | 11 | 8 | 19 | 51 | 77 | 0.662 | 30 | Re-elected |
| 20 | Durham City | 38 | 9 | 10 | 19 | 43 | 59 | 0.729 | 28 | Re-elected |

Source: rsssf.com
(C) Champions; (P) Promoted; (R) Relegated

=== Results ===
| Home \ Away | ACC | ASH | BRW | BPA | CHF | CRE | DAR | DUR | GRI | HAL | HAR | LIN | NEL | ROC | SOU | STL | TRA | WAL | WIG | WRE |
|---|---|---|---|---|---|---|---|---|---|---|---|---|---|---|---|---|---|---|---|---|
| Accrington Stanley | | 4–1 | 3–4 | 4–3 | 0–4 | 0–0 | 2–1 | 3–1 | 4–0 | 4–1 | 2–1 | 1–0 | 0–1 | 2–1 | 3–1 | 1–0 | 4–1 | 2–1 | 0–0 | 1–0 |
| Ashington | 2–5 | | 2–6 | 2–1 | 2–0 | 2–4 | 3–1 | 0–0 | 2–1 | 3–2 | 4–2 | 0–2 | 0–2 | 2–0 | 1–1 | 0–3 | 3–1 | 3–0 | 2–1 | 1–1 |
| Barrow | 5–2 | 3–0 | | 1–2 | 3–1 | 2–0 | 0–1 | 2–1 | 2–0 | 0–1 | 0–0 | 1–3 | 1–0 | 4–1 | 2–0 | 0–1 | 2–1 | 0–0 | 2–3 | 1–0 |
| Bradford Park Avenue | 5–1 | 3–0 | 3–0 | | 1–0 | 3–0 | 2–1 | 4–1 | 2–1 | 2–2 | 1–1 | 4–1 | 6–2 | 3–0 | 5–1 | 1–0 | 3–0 | 2–2 | 1–1 | 0–1 |
| Chesterfield | 3–1 | 2–2 | 2–1 | 2–2 | | 2–1 | 0–0 | 3–1 | 3–2 | 3–0 | 1–1 | 3–3 | 1–2 | 4–0 | 3–0 | 1–0 | 5–0 | 6–0 | 3–1 | 2–1 |
| Crewe Alexandra | 1–1 | 3–1 | 1–0 | 0–1 | 2–0 | | 3–0 | 4–0 | 3–0 | 2–1 | 2–1 | 3–1 | 1–0 | 0–1 | 1–0 | 4–1 | 2–0 | 0–0 | 0–1 | 0–0 |
| Darlington | 4–0 | 1–1 | 3–2 | 2–0 | 4–1 | 5–0 | | 1–0 | 1–3 | 0–1 | 4–0 | 0–0 | 2–3 | 1–1 | 2–1 | 1–0 | 4–0 | 2–0 | 2–0 | 4–1 |
| Durham City | 4–1 | 1–1 | 4–1 | 0–0 | 1–1 | 2–0 | 0–0 | | 0–3 | 2–2 | 3–2 | 7–1 | 0–1 | 1–1 | 1–1 | 0–0 | 1–0 | 0–2 | 2–2 | 2–0 |
| Grimsby Town | 7–1 | 7–4 | 2–0 | 0–1 | 3–1 | 2–3 | 0–1 | 1–0 | | 0–1 | 1–0 | 1–0 | 0–2 | 1–1 | 2–1 | 3–0 | 0–0 | 1–2 | 0–0 | 4–0 |
| Halifax Town | 0–0 | 0–0 | 3–0 | 3–0 | 2–0 | 1–0 | 2–1 | 1–3 | 1–0 | | 3–0 | 3–1 | 2–2 | 1–0 | 0–1 | 2–1 | 3–1 | 1–2 | 0–1 | 1–1 |
| Hartlepools United | 0–0 | 3–1 | 2–0 | 0–1 | 5–0 | 1–1 | 1–0 | 2–1 | 2–0 | 3–2 | | 2–0 | 5–1 | 0–2 | 1–1 | 4–0 | 0–1 | 2–2 | 0–0 | 1–1 |
| Lincoln City | 0–0 | 2–0 | 1–1 | 0–0 | 0–0 | 1–0 | 1–1 | 3–1 | 1–2 | 0–0 | 2–1 | | 1–0 | 0–1 | 2–0 | 1–1 | 2–0 | 0–2 | 2–1 | 2–0 |
| Nelson | 2–1 | 1–3 | 2–1 | 1–0 | 4–0 | 0–0 | 3–0 | 4–0 | 1–1 | 2–0 | 4–1 | 2–1 | | 1–2 | 2–0 | 1–0 | 1–0 | 3–0 | 1–0 | 2–0 |
| Rochdale | 1–1 | 2–0 | 3–1 | 0–3 | 0–2 | 1–1 | 2–2 | 2–0 | 0–1 | 0–1 | 4–0 | 1–1 | 0–3 | | 3–2 | 2–0 | 0–0 | 0–2 | 3–2 | 5–0 |
| Southport | 1–2 | 1–0 | 2–0 | 0–0 | 0–2 | 2–0 | 2–1 | 1–0 | 3–1 | 1–3 | 1–0 | 3–0 | 0–1 | 0–1 | | 0–0 | 0–0 | 2–1 | 1–0 | 1–0 |
| Stalybridge Celtic | 1–0 | 2–1 | 2–0 | 1–0 | 1–2 | 0–1 | 4–2 | 1–0 | 3–2 | 4–3 | 1–1 | 0–1 | 2–0 | 0–0 | 1–0 | | 4–1 | 2–0 | 0–2 | 3–2 |
| Tranmere Rovers | 4–1 | 1–0 | 3–0 | 0–0 | 2–3 | 1–2 | 2–2 | 5–1 | 3–2 | 2–1 | 1–1 | 2–0 | 0–2 | 2–0 | 2–0 | 1–1 | | 2–3 | 4–2 | 4–0 |
| Walsall | 0–2 | 2–1 | 3–1 | 1–0 | 0–1 | 1–1 | 2–2 | 2–0 | 1–0 | 2–1 | 2–2 | 2–0 | 5–0 | 0–0 | 1–0 | 2–1 | 2–1 | | 3–1 | 1–0 |
| Wigan Borough | 2–0 | 6–1 | 2–1 | 3–2 | 1–0 | 1–1 | 3–0 | 0–2 | 1–0 | 0–1 | 2–0 | 9–1 | 3–1 | 6–0 | 1–0 | 3–0 | 0–0 | 1–0 | | 1–1 |
| Wrexham | 2–0 | 0–0 | 0–0 | 3–0 | 3–1 | 2–1 | 0–0 | 1–0 | 1–1 | 2–1 | 2–0 | 0–2 | 2–1 | 3–1 | 1–1 | 2–1 | 2–1 | 1–0 | 2–1 | |

Source: Ian Laschke: Rothmans Book of Football League Records 1888–89 to 1978–79. Macdonald and Jane’s, London & Sydney, 1980.
Legend: Blue = home team win; Yellow = draw; Red = away team win.

=== Maps ===
Locations of the Football League Third Division North teams

== Third Division South ==
Football League Third Division South
- Season: 1922–23
- Champions: Bristol City (1st title)
- Failed re-election: None
- Matches: 462
- Goals: 1,141 (2.47 per match)
- Top goalscorer: Fred Pagnam (Watford), 30

| Pos | Team | Pld | W | D | L | GF | GA | GAv | Pts | Promotion or relegation |
|---|---|---|---|---|---|---|---|---|---|---|
| 1 | Bristol City (C, P) | 42 | 24 | 11 | 7 | 66 | 40 | 1.650 | 59 | Promotion to the Second Division |
| 2 | Plymouth Argyle | 42 | 23 | 7 | 12 | 61 | 29 | 2.103 | 53 | |
| 3 | Swansea Town | 42 | 22 | 9 | 11 | 78 | 45 | 1.733 | 53 | |
| 4 | Brighton & Hove Albion | 42 | 20 | 11 | 11 | 52 | 34 | 1.529 | 51 | |
| 5 | Luton Town | 42 | 21 | 7 | 14 | 68 | 49 | 1.388 | 49 | |
| 6 | Millwall | 42 | 14 | 18 | 10 | 45 | 40 | 1.125 | 46 | |
| 7 | Portsmouth | 42 | 19 | 8 | 15 | 58 | 52 | 1.115 | 46 | |
| 8 | Northampton Town | 42 | 17 | 11 | 14 | 54 | 44 | 1.227 | 45 | |
| 9 | Swindon Town | 42 | 17 | 11 | 14 | 62 | 56 | 1.107 | 45 | |
| 10 | Watford | 42 | 17 | 10 | 15 | 57 | 54 | 1.056 | 44 | |
| 11 | Queens Park Rangers | 42 | 16 | 10 | 16 | 54 | 49 | 1.102 | 42 | |
| 12 | Charlton Athletic | 42 | 14 | 14 | 14 | 55 | 51 | 1.078 | 42 | |
| 13 | Bristol Rovers | 42 | 13 | 16 | 13 | 35 | 36 | 0.972 | 42 | |
| 14 | Brentford | 42 | 13 | 12 | 17 | 41 | 51 | 0.804 | 38 | |
| 15 | Southend United | 42 | 12 | 13 | 17 | 49 | 54 | 0.907 | 37 | |
| 16 | Gillingham | 42 | 15 | 7 | 20 | 51 | 59 | 0.864 | 37 | |
| 17 | Merthyr Town | 42 | 11 | 14 | 17 | 39 | 48 | 0.813 | 36 | |
| 18 | Norwich City | 42 | 13 | 10 | 19 | 51 | 71 | 0.718 | 36 | |
| 19 | Reading | 42 | 10 | 14 | 18 | 36 | 55 | 0.655 | 34 | |
| 20 | Exeter City | 42 | 13 | 7 | 22 | 47 | 84 | 0.560 | 33 | |
| 21 | Aberdare Athletic | 42 | 9 | 11 | 22 | 42 | 70 | 0.600 | 29 | Re-elected |
| 22 | Newport County | 42 | 8 | 11 | 23 | 40 | 70 | 0.571 | 27 | Re-elected |

(C) Champions; (P) Promoted

=== Results ===
| Home \ Away | ADE | BRE | B&HA | BRI | BRR | CHA | EXE | GIL | LUT | MER | MIL | NPC | NOR | NWC | PLY | POR | QPR | REA | STD | SWA | SWI | WAT |
|---|---|---|---|---|---|---|---|---|---|---|---|---|---|---|---|---|---|---|---|---|---|---|
| Aberdare Athletic | | 0–0 | 0–1 | 0–1 | 0–0 | 3–1 | 3–1 | 2–0 | 2–1 | 0–0 | 0–1 | 6–2 | 0–2 | 0–3 | 2–2 | 0–2 | 0–0 | 0–0 | 1–1 | 0–1 | 3–3 | 3–1 |
| Brentford | 0–1 | | 1–2 | 4–0 | 0–1 | 0–3 | 0–1 | 2–0 | 3–2 | 3–1 | 1–1 | 0–0 | 2–1 | 1–4 | 2–0 | 1–0 | 1–3 | 1–1 | 0–0 | 0–1 | 3–0 | 2–1 |
| Brighton & Hove Albion | 3–1 | 2–1 | | 2–1 | 2–1 | 1–0 | 3–0 | 3–0 | 0–1 | 0–0 | 2–0 | 2–1 | 1–0 | 0–0 | 1–0 | 7–1 | 2–0 | 3–1 | 0–1 | 1–3 | 1–1 | 3–0 |
| Bristol City | 0–0 | 1–1 | 3–1 | | 0–1 | 3–1 | 1–1 | 2–1 | 1–0 | 3–0 | 1–1 | 2–0 | 1–0 | 4–0 | 2–0 | 2–1 | 3–2 | 2–1 | 5–0 | 1–0 | 3–1 | 3–1 |
| Bristol Rovers | 1–0 | 1–1 | 0–0 | 1–2 | | 1–1 | 3–3 | 1–0 | 1–1 | 3–0 | 0–0 | 3–1 | 0–0 | 3–2 | 0–1 | 0–1 | 1–3 | 1–1 | 2–0 | 0–0 | 2–0 | 1–2 |
| Charlton Athletic | 1–1 | 1–1 | 0–1 | 1–0 | 0–0 | | 0–0 | 3–1 | 2–1 | 0–1 | 0–2 | 6–0 | 2–0 | 3–0 | 1–0 | 0–2 | 1–1 | 1–0 | 5–1 | 3–1 | 3–1 | 0–0 |
| Exeter City | 1–0 | 0–2 | 1–0 | 0–0 | 0–0 | 0–0 | | 0–1 | 1–2 | 2–1 | 2–1 | 4–0 | 1–2 | 2–0 | 0–0 | 2–3 | 1–2 | 4–0 | 2–1 | 1–0 | 2–1 | 1–2 |
| Gillingham | 4–0 | 2–0 | 2–0 | 1–1 | 0–1 | 2–2 | 2–1 | | 1–0 | 2–0 | 3–0 | 3–0 | 0–3 | 5–0 | 1–0 | 4–2 | 0–1 | 2–1 | 1–0 | 2–2 | 0–0 | 1–4 |
| Luton Town | 4–1 | 4–0 | 1–1 | 1–1 | 1–0 | 2–2 | 6–0 | 2–0 | | 2–1 | 2–2 | 1–0 | 2–1 | 4–0 | 2–1 | 0–2 | 1–0 | 1–2 | 2–0 | 6–1 | 3–2 | 0–1 |
| Merthyr Town | 0–2 | 1–0 | 2–0 | 0–1 | 1–1 | 3–0 | 3–1 | 1–0 | 0–1 | | 1–1 | 1–0 | 3–0 | 0–1 | 0–1 | 3–0 | 0–1 | 1–1 | 2–1 | 2–1 | 1–1 | 2–3 |
| Millwall | 1–0 | 1–1 | 2–1 | 1–1 | 1–0 | 1–1 | 3–0 | 3–1 | 0–0 | 1–0 | | 0–0 | 2–0 | 3–0 | 0–0 | 1–3 | 0–0 | 0–0 | 1–1 | 0–2 | 1–1 | 5–1 |
| Newport County | 0–0 | 0–1 | 1–0 | 0–1 | 4–1 | 4–0 | 6–2 | 2–1 | 0–3 | 1–1 | 0–0 | | 1–1 | 1–3 | 1–0 | 0–0 | 1–0 | 3–0 | 0–2 | 1–2 | 2–2 | 0–1 |
| Northampton Town | 3–1 | 1–1 | 0–0 | 2–1 | 1–0 | 0–0 | 3–0 | 1–0 | 2–0 | 1–1 | 2–1 | 2–1 | | 1–1 | 1–0 | 3–0 | 4–2 | 5–0 | 5–2 | 1–3 | 1–2 | 1–1 |
| Norwich City | 1–4 | 0–2 | 1–0 | 2–2 | 0–0 | 2–3 | 6–0 | 1–1 | 1–2 | 1–1 | 3–2 | 1–1 | 1–0 | | 1–0 | 0–2 | 1–1 | 2–0 | 2–1 | 1–4 | 0–0 | 2–0 |
| Plymouth Argyle | 2–0 | 3–0 | 2–2 | 5–1 | 3–0 | 2–0 | 5–1 | 2–0 | 4–0 | 2–0 | 1–0 | 1–0 | 1–0 | 1–1 | | 2–0 | 2–0 | 3–0 | 1–1 | 2–0 | 2–0 | 1–0 |
| Portsmouth | 1–0 | 3–0 | 1–2 | 1–2 | 0–0 | 3–0 | 3–4 | 6–1 | 1–2 | 1–1 | 2–0 | 2–0 | 0–0 | 2–1 | 1–2 | | 1–1 | 1–0 | 0–0 | 0–3 | 4–1 | 1–0 |
| Queens Park Rangers | 4–1 | 1–1 | 0–0 | 1–2 | 3–1 | 1–2 | 2–0 | 2–1 | 4–0 | 1–1 | 2–3 | 1–1 | 3–2 | 2–0 | 2–3 | 0–1 | | 1–0 | 1–0 | 2–1 | 0–2 | 1–2 |
| Reading | 1–0 | 1–0 | 0–0 | 0–0 | 0–1 | 2–1 | 1–3 | 1–1 | 3–0 | 1–0 | 1–2 | 2–0 | 0–0 | 4–1 | 0–1 | 0–0 | 0–0 | | 1–1 | 4–4 | 1–0 | 1–0 |
| Southend United | 4–0 | 1–2 | 0–0 | 0–3 | 0–0 | 0–0 | 5–0 | 1–1 | 1–3 | 1–1 | 4–0 | 3–1 | 1–2 | 3–1 | 2–1 | 0–0 | 2–0 | 3–1 | | 0–1 | 2–0 | 2–1 |
| Swansea Town | 5–1 | 0–0 | 0–0 | 4–1 | 0–1 | 3–2 | 5–1 | 1–0 | 1–0 | 1–1 | 0–1 | 5–1 | 4–0 | 3–1 | 1–1 | 2–1 | 3–0 | 2–2 | 1–0 | | 5–0 | 0–0 |
| Swindon Town | 5–4 | 3–0 | 3–0 | 0–1 | 1–0 | 2–1 | 2–1 | 0–1 | 1–1 | 4–0 | 0–0 | 2–2 | 2–0 | 1–2 | 2–1 | 3–0 | 1–0 | 3–1 | 3–0 | 2–1 | | 1–1 |
| Watford | 6–0 | 2–0 | 1–2 | 1–1 | 0–1 | 2–2 | 4–0 | 5–2 | 2–1 | 1–1 | 0–0 | 2–1 | 0–0 | 2–1 | 1–0 | 2–3 | 0–3 | 1–0 | 1–1 | 2–1 | 0–3 | |

Updated to match(es) played on unknown. Source: Ian Laschke: Rothmans Book of Football League Records 1888–89 to 1978–79. Macdonald and Jane’s, London & Sydney, 1980.
Legend: Blue = home team win; Yellow = draw; Red = away team win.

=== Maps ===
Locations of the Football League Third Division South teams
Locations of the Football League Third Division South London teams

== Attendances ==
=== Division One ===
| No. | Club | Average |
|---|---|---|
| 1 | Liverpool FC | 33,495 |
| 2 | Tottenham Hotspur FC | 31,425 |
| 3 | Everton FC | 30,905 |
| 4 | Arsenal FC | 30,245 |
| 5 | Chelsea FC | 30,000 |
| 6 | Aston Villa FC | 28,550 |
| 7 | Cardiff City FC | 27,475 |
| 8 | Birmingham City FC | 27,470 |
| 9 | Newcastle United FC | 27,085 |
| 10 | Manchester City FC | 23,850 |
| 11 | Sunderland AFC | 23,070 |
| 12 | Bolton Wanderers FC | 21,870 |
| 13 | Sheffield United FC | 20,145 |
| 14 | Stoke City FC | 19,450 |
| 15 | Preston North End FC | 19,065 |
| 16 | Blackburn Rovers FC | 18,755 |
| 17 | West Bromwich Albion FC | 18,315 |
| 18 | Middlesbrough FC | 17,855 |
| 19 | Burnley FC | 16,885 |
| 20 | Nottingham Forest FC | 15,930 |
| 21 | Huddersfield Town AFC | 14,885 |
| 22 | Oldham Athletic FC | 13,965 |

== See also ==
- 1922-23 in English football
- 1922 in association football
- 1923 in association football
