= 1922–23 in English football =

Football in England
- Season: 1922–23

Men's football
- Football League: Liverpool
- Football League Second Division: Notts County
- FA Cup: Bolton Wanderers

The 1922–23 season was the 48th season of competitive football in England.

== Overview ==
Liverpool retained the First Division title, but halfway through the season their manager David Ashworth left the club to take over at Oldham Athletic, who ended the season relegated.

== Honours ==
| Competition | Winner | Runner-up |
|---|---|---|
| First Division | Liverpool (4) | Sunderland |
| Second Division | Notts County | West Ham United |
| Third Division North | Nelson | Bradford Park Avenue |
| Third Division South | Bristol City | Plymouth Argyle |
| FA Cup | Bolton Wanderers (1) | West Ham United |
| Charity Shield | Huddersfield Town | Liverpool |
| Home Championship | Scotland | England |

Notes = Number in parentheses is the times that club has won that honour. * indicates new record for competition

== Football League ==
=== First Division ===
| Pos | Team | Pld | W | D | L | GF | GA | GAv | Pts | Relegation |
|---|---|---|---|---|---|---|---|---|---|---|
| 1 | Liverpool (C) | 42 | 26 | 8 | 8 | 70 | 31 | 2.258 | 60 | |
| 2 | Sunderland | 42 | 22 | 10 | 10 | 72 | 54 | 1.333 | 54 | |
| 3 | Huddersfield Town | 42 | 21 | 11 | 10 | 60 | 32 | 1.875 | 53 | |
| 4 | Newcastle United | 42 | 18 | 12 | 12 | 45 | 37 | 1.216 | 48 | |
| 5 | Everton | 42 | 20 | 7 | 15 | 63 | 59 | 1.068 | 47 | |
| 6 | Aston Villa | 42 | 18 | 10 | 14 | 64 | 51 | 1.255 | 46 | |
| 7 | West Bromwich Albion | 42 | 17 | 11 | 14 | 58 | 49 | 1.184 | 45 | |
| 8 | Manchester City | 42 | 17 | 11 | 14 | 50 | 49 | 1.020 | 45 | |
| 9 | Cardiff City | 42 | 18 | 7 | 17 | 73 | 59 | 1.237 | 43 | |
| 10 | Sheffield United | 42 | 16 | 10 | 16 | 68 | 64 | 1.063 | 42 | |
| 11 | Arsenal | 42 | 16 | 10 | 16 | 61 | 62 | 0.984 | 42 | |
| 12 | Tottenham Hotspur | 42 | 17 | 7 | 18 | 50 | 50 | 1.000 | 41 | |
| 13 | Bolton Wanderers | 42 | 14 | 12 | 16 | 50 | 58 | 0.862 | 40 | |
| 14 | Blackburn Rovers | 42 | 14 | 12 | 16 | 47 | 62 | 0.758 | 40 | |
| 15 | Burnley | 42 | 16 | 6 | 20 | 58 | 59 | 0.983 | 38 | |
| 16 | Preston North End | 42 | 13 | 11 | 18 | 60 | 64 | 0.938 | 37 | |
| 17 | Birmingham | 42 | 13 | 11 | 18 | 41 | 57 | 0.719 | 37 | |
| 18 | Middlesbrough | 42 | 13 | 10 | 19 | 57 | 63 | 0.905 | 36 | |
| 19 | Chelsea | 42 | 9 | 18 | 15 | 45 | 53 | 0.849 | 36 | |
| 20 | Nottingham Forest | 42 | 13 | 8 | 21 | 41 | 70 | 0.586 | 34 | |
| 21 | Stoke (R) | 42 | 10 | 10 | 22 | 47 | 67 | 0.701 | 30 | Relegation to the Second Division |
| 22 | Oldham Athletic (R) | 42 | 10 | 10 | 22 | 35 | 65 | 0.538 | 30 | Relegation to the Second Division |

Source: World Football
Rules for classification: 1) Points; 2) Goal average; 3) Goals scored
(C) Champions; (R) Relegated

=== Second Division ===
| Pos | Team | Pld | W | D | L | GF | GA | GAv | Pts | Promotion or relegation |
|---|---|---|---|---|---|---|---|---|---|---|
| 1 | Notts County (C, P) | 42 | 23 | 7 | 12 | 46 | 34 | 1.353 | 53 | Promotion to the First Division |
| 2 | West Ham United (P) | 42 | 20 | 11 | 11 | 63 | 38 | 1.658 | 51 | Promotion to the First Division |
| 3 | Leicester City | 42 | 21 | 9 | 12 | 65 | 44 | 1.477 | 51 | |
| 4 | Manchester United | 42 | 17 | 14 | 11 | 51 | 36 | 1.417 | 48 | |
| 5 | Blackpool | 42 | 18 | 11 | 13 | 60 | 43 | 1.395 | 47 | |
| 6 | Bury | 42 | 18 | 11 | 13 | 55 | 46 | 1.196 | 47 | |
| 7 | Leeds United | 42 | 18 | 11 | 13 | 43 | 36 | 1.194 | 47 | |
| 8 | The Wednesday | 42 | 17 | 12 | 13 | 54 | 47 | 1.149 | 46 | |
| 9 | Barnsley | 42 | 17 | 11 | 14 | 62 | 51 | 1.216 | 45 | |
| 10 | Fulham | 42 | 16 | 12 | 14 | 43 | 32 | 1.344 | 44 | |
| 11 | Southampton | 42 | 14 | 14 | 14 | 40 | 40 | 1.000 | 42 | |
| 12 | Hull City | 42 | 14 | 14 | 14 | 43 | 45 | 0.956 | 42 | |
| 13 | South Shields | 42 | 15 | 10 | 17 | 35 | 44 | 0.795 | 40 | |
| 14 | Derby County | 42 | 14 | 11 | 17 | 46 | 50 | 0.920 | 39 | |
| 15 | Bradford City | 42 | 12 | 13 | 17 | 41 | 45 | 0.911 | 37 | |
| 16 | Crystal Palace | 42 | 13 | 11 | 18 | 54 | 62 | 0.871 | 37 | |
| 17 | Port Vale | 42 | 14 | 9 | 19 | 39 | 51 | 0.765 | 37 | |
| 18 | Coventry City | 42 | 15 | 7 | 20 | 46 | 63 | 0.730 | 37 | |
| 19 | Clapton Orient | 42 | 12 | 12 | 18 | 40 | 50 | 0.800 | 36 | |
| 20 | Stockport County | 42 | 14 | 8 | 20 | 43 | 58 | 0.741 | 36 | |
| 21 | Rotherham County (R) | 42 | 13 | 9 | 20 | 44 | 63 | 0.698 | 35 | Relegation to the Third Division North |
| 22 | Wolverhampton Wanderers (R) | 42 | 9 | 9 | 24 | 42 | 77 | 0.545 | 27 | Relegation to the Third Division North |

(C) Champions; (P) Promoted; (R) Relegated

=== Third Division North ===
| Pos | Team | Pld | W | D | L | GF | GA | GAv | Pts | Promotion or relegation |
|---|---|---|---|---|---|---|---|---|---|---|
| 1 | Nelson (C, P) | 38 | 24 | 3 | 11 | 61 | 41 | 1.488 | 51 | Promotion to the Second Division |
| 2 | Bradford (Park Avenue) | 38 | 19 | 9 | 10 | 67 | 38 | 1.763 | 47 | |
| 3 | Walsall | 38 | 19 | 8 | 11 | 51 | 44 | 1.159 | 46 | |
| 4 | Chesterfield | 38 | 19 | 7 | 12 | 68 | 52 | 1.308 | 45 | |
| 5 | Wigan Borough | 38 | 18 | 8 | 12 | 64 | 39 | 1.641 | 44 | |
| 6 | Crewe Alexandra | 38 | 17 | 9 | 12 | 48 | 38 | 1.263 | 43 | |
| 7 | Halifax Town | 38 | 17 | 7 | 14 | 53 | 46 | 1.152 | 41 | |
| 8 | Accrington Stanley | 38 | 17 | 7 | 14 | 59 | 65 | 0.908 | 41 | |
| 9 | Darlington | 38 | 15 | 10 | 13 | 59 | 46 | 1.283 | 40 | |
| 10 | Wrexham | 38 | 14 | 10 | 14 | 38 | 48 | 0.792 | 38 | |
| 11 | Stalybridge Celtic (R) | 38 | 15 | 6 | 17 | 42 | 47 | 0.894 | 36 | Resigned from the league |
| 12 | Rochdale | 38 | 13 | 10 | 15 | 42 | 53 | 0.792 | 36 | |
| 13 | Lincoln City | 38 | 13 | 10 | 15 | 39 | 55 | 0.709 | 36 | |
| 14 | Grimsby Town | 38 | 14 | 5 | 19 | 55 | 52 | 1.058 | 33 | |
| 15 | Hartlepools United | 38 | 10 | 12 | 16 | 48 | 54 | 0.889 | 32 | |
| 16 | Tranmere Rovers | 38 | 12 | 8 | 18 | 49 | 59 | 0.831 | 32 | |
| 17 | Southport | 38 | 12 | 7 | 19 | 32 | 46 | 0.696 | 31 | |
| 18 | Barrow | 38 | 13 | 4 | 21 | 50 | 60 | 0.833 | 30 | |
| 19 | Ashington | 38 | 11 | 8 | 19 | 51 | 77 | 0.662 | 30 | Re-elected |
| 20 | Durham City | 38 | 9 | 10 | 19 | 43 | 59 | 0.729 | 28 | Re-elected |

Source: rsssf.com
(C) Champions; (P) Promoted; (R) Relegated

=== Third Division South ===
| Pos | Team | Pld | W | D | L | GF | GA | GAv | Pts | Promotion or relegation |
|---|---|---|---|---|---|---|---|---|---|---|
| 1 | Bristol City (C, P) | 42 | 24 | 11 | 7 | 66 | 40 | 1.650 | 59 | Promotion to the Second Division |
| 2 | Plymouth Argyle | 42 | 23 | 7 | 12 | 61 | 29 | 2.103 | 53 | |
| 3 | Swansea Town | 42 | 22 | 9 | 11 | 78 | 45 | 1.733 | 53 | |
| 4 | Brighton & Hove Albion | 42 | 20 | 11 | 11 | 52 | 34 | 1.529 | 51 | |
| 5 | Luton Town | 42 | 21 | 7 | 14 | 68 | 49 | 1.388 | 49 | |
| 6 | Millwall | 42 | 14 | 18 | 10 | 45 | 40 | 1.125 | 46 | |
| 7 | Portsmouth | 42 | 19 | 8 | 15 | 58 | 52 | 1.115 | 46 | |
| 8 | Northampton Town | 42 | 17 | 11 | 14 | 54 | 44 | 1.227 | 45 | |
| 9 | Swindon Town | 42 | 17 | 11 | 14 | 62 | 56 | 1.107 | 45 | |
| 10 | Watford | 42 | 17 | 10 | 15 | 57 | 54 | 1.056 | 44 | |
| 11 | Queens Park Rangers | 42 | 16 | 10 | 16 | 54 | 49 | 1.102 | 42 | |
| 12 | Charlton Athletic | 42 | 14 | 14 | 14 | 55 | 51 | 1.078 | 42 | |
| 13 | Bristol Rovers | 42 | 13 | 16 | 13 | 35 | 36 | 0.972 | 42 | |
| 14 | Brentford | 42 | 13 | 12 | 17 | 41 | 51 | 0.804 | 38 | |
| 15 | Southend United | 42 | 12 | 13 | 17 | 49 | 54 | 0.907 | 37 | |
| 16 | Gillingham | 42 | 15 | 7 | 20 | 51 | 59 | 0.864 | 37 | |
| 17 | Merthyr Town | 42 | 11 | 14 | 17 | 39 | 48 | 0.813 | 36 | |
| 18 | Norwich City | 42 | 13 | 10 | 19 | 51 | 71 | 0.718 | 36 | |
| 19 | Reading | 42 | 10 | 14 | 18 | 36 | 55 | 0.655 | 34 | |
| 20 | Exeter City | 42 | 13 | 7 | 22 | 47 | 84 | 0.560 | 33 | |
| 21 | Aberdare Athletic | 42 | 9 | 11 | 22 | 42 | 70 | 0.600 | 29 | Re-elected |
| 22 | Newport County | 42 | 8 | 11 | 23 | 40 | 70 | 0.571 | 27 | Re-elected |

(C) Champions; (P) Promoted

=== Top goalscorers ===
First Division

- Charlie Buchan (Sunderland) – 30 goals

Second Division

- Harry Bedford (Blackpool) – 32 goals

Third Division North

- George Beel (Chesterfield) and Jimmy Carmichael (Grimsby Town) – 23 goals

Third Division South

- Fred Pagnam (Watford) – 30 goals
