= Donald Kelly =

Donald or Don Kelly may refer to:

- Donald G. Kelly (born 1941), American politician, attorney and horse breeder
- Donald P. Kelly (1922–2010), Chicago businessman
- Don Kelly (footballer) (1922–2009), English footballer
- Don Kelly (baseball) (born 1980), American Major League Baseball manager and former player
- Don O'Kelly (1924–1966), also Don Kelly, American actor

== See also ==
- Donald E. Kelley (1908–1995), associate justice of the Colorado Supreme Court
