= Stan Thompson =

English footballer

Personal information
- Full name: Alfred Stanley Thompson
- Date of birth: 11 May 1908
- Place of birth: Durham, England
- Date of death: 23 July 1980 (aged 72)
- Place of death: Scarborough, England
- Height: 5 ft 4 in (1.63 m)
- Position: Outside forward

Senior career*
Years	Team	Apps	(Gls)
19??–1929	Durham City		
1929–1935	Brighton & Hove Albion	58	(14)
1935–1936	Hartlepools United	34	(11)
1936	Exeter City	3	(0)
1937–1938	Hartlepools United	0	(0)
- * Club domestic league appearances and goals

Alfred Stanley Thompson (11 May 1908 – 23 July 1980) was an English professional footballer who played as an outside right in the Football League for Brighton & Hove Albion, Hartlepools United and Exeter City.

== Life and career ==
Thompson was born in Durham in 1908. He played football for Durham City before signing for Brighton & Hove Albion in late 1929. He stayed with the club for nearly six seasons, but was never able to establish himself in the side. He returned to the north-east to join Third Division club Hartlepools United. In the opening match of the season, against Halifax Town, he scored a late winner when his corner kick "completely bamboozled" the opposing goalkeeper who could only succeed in pushing the ball into the net via the post. Thompson continued as a regular at outside right, scoring 11 goals from 34 league appearances, but was given a free transfer at the end of the season. He finished his Football League career with three matches for Exeter City as part of a month's trial. Although he returned to Hartlepools for the 1937–38 season, he played no more first-team football. Thompson died in Scarborough in 1980 at the age of 72.
