= Luigi Bosco =

Italian footballer

Personal information
- Date of birth: 20 March 1922
- Place of birth: Montechiaro d'Asti, Italy
- Date of death: 13 October 2006 (aged 84)
- Place of death: Turin, Italy
- Position: Defender

Senior career*
Years	Team	Apps	(Gls)
1946–1947	Juventus	4	(0)
1947–1951	Como	104	(1)
1951–1952	Catania	3	(0)
- * Club domestic league appearances and goals

Luigi Bosco (20 March 1922 – 13 October 2006) was an Italian professional footballer.
