= Armando Tre Re =

Italian footballer (1922-2003)

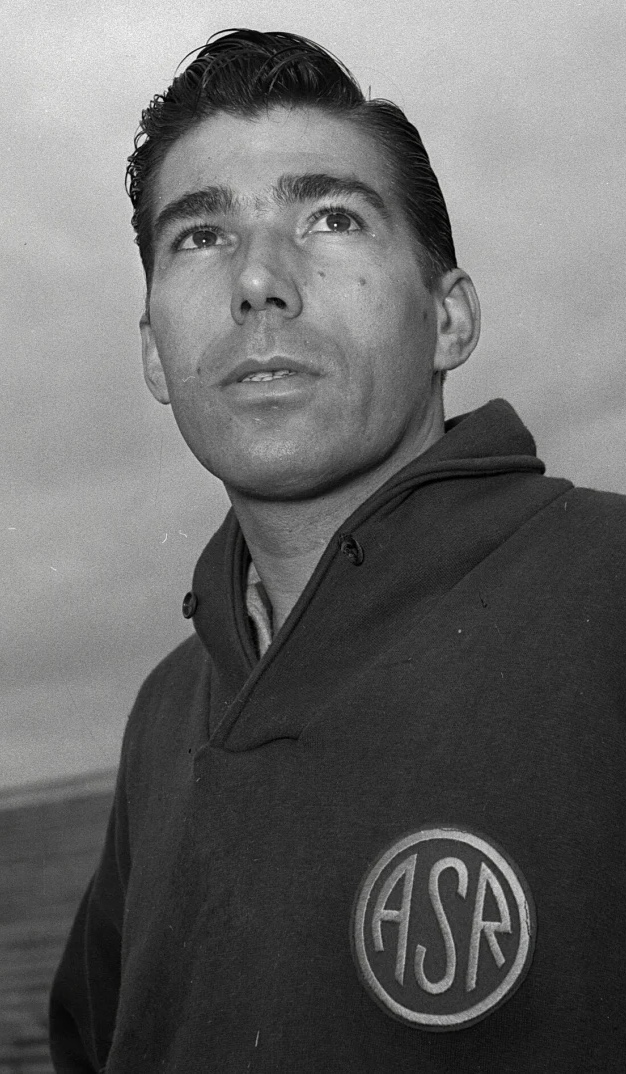
- Armando Tre Re, 1950s

Personal information
- Date of birth: 22 June 1922
- Place of birth: Florence, Kingdom of Italy
- Date of death: 31 December 2003 (aged 81)
- Place of death: Florence, Italy
- Positions: Defender; striker (Note: Tre Re played a striker earlier in his career.)

Senior career*
Years	Team	Apps	(Gls)
1945–1947	Massese	63	(7)
1947–1949	Livorno	36	(4)
1949–1954	Roma	149	(6)
1954–1956	Napoli	66	(0)
1957–1958	Massese	1	(0)
Total		315	(17)
- * Club domestic league appearances and goals

Armando Tre Re (22 June 1922 – 31 December 2003) was an Italian professional footballer who played as a defender or forward. He played for 8 seasons (218 games, 9 goals) in the Serie A for A.S. Livorno Calcio, A.S. Roma and S.S.C. Napoli. For three seasons (from 1950 to 1953) he was Roma's captain. Tre Re died in 2003.
