= Paddy Waters (hurler) =

Irish hurler

Patrick Waters was an Irish hurler. At club level he played for Mount Sion, winning several Waterford Senior Championship titles, and was sub-goalkeeper on the Waterford senior hurling team that won the 1948 All-Ireland Championship.
