= Saint Helena Football League =

- Founded: 1922
- Country: Saint Helena
- Number of clubs: 6
- Level on pyramid: 1
- Current champions: Bellboys (2023 (11th title))
- Most championships: Rovers (19 titles)

The Saint Helena Football League is the top division of football on Saint Helena.

== History ==
The Saint Helena Football League is regarded as one of the most remote football leagues in the world. It was founded in 1922. It starts in May and finishes in the winter. Games are played on Francis Plain Playing Field.
