= Steven W. Tolliday =

Steven W. Tolliday is professor of economic and social history at the University of Leeds. He is a specialist in the 20th century industrial history of Britain and the motor industry in particular. He was the editor of Business History Review from 1988 to 1993 and was a founding editor and co-editor of Enterprise & Society from 1999 to 2007.
