= Ted Pole =

English footballer

Personal information
- Full name: Harold Edward William Pole
- Date of birth: 25 March 1922
- Place of birth: Kessingland, England
- Date of death: 13 December 2010 (aged 88)
- Place of death: Felixstowe, England
- Position: Centre forward

Senior career*
Years	Team	Apps	(Gls)
- Gorleston
1946–1950	Ipswich Town	39	(13)
1951–1953	Leyton Orient	12	(0)
- Chelmsford City
- * Club domestic league appearances and goals

Harold Edward William Pole (25 March 1922 — 13 December 2010) was an English footballer who played as a centre forward.

== Career ==
In 1946, Pole signed for Ipswich Town from Gorleston. Pole scored 13 times in 39 Football League games for Ipswich. In 1951, Pole signed for Leyton Orient, where he made 13 appearances, before joining Chelmsford City.
