= Tommy McLain (footballer) =

English footballer

Personal information
- Full name: Thomas McLain
- Date of birth: 19 January 1922
- Place of birth: Morpeth, Northumberland, England
- Date of death: December 1995 (aged 73)
- Height: 5 ft 9 in (1.75 m)
- Position: Wing half

Senior career*
Years	Team	Apps	(Gls)
1945–1946	Ashington		
1946–1952	Sunderland	67	(1)
1952–1956	Northampton Town	96	(11)
1956–1957	Headington United		
1957–19??	Wellingborough Town		
- * Club domestic league appearances and goals

Thomas McLain (19 January 1922 – December 1995) was an English professional footballer who played as a wing half for Sunderland.
