= SV Brackel 06 =

German football club

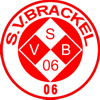
- Full name: Sportverein Brackel 06
- Founded: 1906 (as Viktoria Brackel); 1922 (merger)
- Ground: Sportplatz Oesterstraße
- League: Westfalenliga 2 (VI)
- 2015–16: 12th

Sportverein Brackel 06 is a German association football club from the Brackel quarter of Dortmund, North Rhine-Westphalia.

== History ==
The club was founded in February 1922 from the merger of predecessors Sportverein Viktoria Brackel bei Dortmund and Fußball-Club Fortuna 09 Brackel, formed in 1906 and 1909 respectively. These clubs absorbed Brackeler TV Turnklub in May 1920 to form TSK Dortmund-Brackel, but the merger was undone within that year. After World War II SV was dissolved like many sports clubs and later refounded in February 1946.

The men's team first qualified for the Landesliga Westfalen (III) in 1955 after a decisive 2–1 win over Alemannia Dortmund for promotion from the Bezirksklasse (IV). By virtue of a second-to-last position SV remained in the new fourth-tier Landesliga when the Verbandsliga Westfalen was introduced in 1956 as the highest league in Westphalia. The club was relegated in 1958 then entered a period of obscurity in the lower leagues for the next decades. In 2000 SV returned to the Landesliga (VI) but went down once again to spend the next 13 years in the Bezirksliga. Two titles and promotions in three preceding seasons put the men's players back to the Westfalenliga in 2015.

=== Women's team ===
SV was joined by the women's team of neighboring TSC Eintracht Dortmund in 1975 after they seceded from that club over internal disputes. They first won promotion to the Regionalliga West (I) in 1986 and remained there after the Frauen-Bundesliga was created in 1990. In 1994 they finished runners-up to champions SG Wattenscheid 09 Frauen and qualified in the promotion round against FTSV Lorbeer Rothenburgsort, but financial shortcomings forced them to withdraw from participation. The next seasons saw them shuffle between mediocrity and relegation battles until a last place dropped them to the Frauen-Westfalenliga (III) in 2000, but the club folded its women's side. A new women's team was refounded in 2010 and it now plays in the Kreisliga A Dortmund (VII).

SV won the women's Westphalia Cup in 1996 and finished runners-up five times. Three of those runners-up finishes qualified them for the women's German Cup where they had three appearances and their best finish in the cup was the second round in 1993–94 when they were smothered by TSV Siegen 0–9, after tripping Bundesliga side KBC Duisburg 2–0. The last two campaigns ended in hapless first round routs to Grun-Weiß Brauweiler and FC Rumeln-Kaldenhausen.

== Honors ==
Men

- Landesliga Westfalen 3
  - Winners: 2015
- Bezirksliga Staffel 8
  - Winners: 2013

Women

- Frauen-Westfalenpokal
  - Winners: 1996
