= Les Donaldson =

Scottish footballer

Personal information
- Full name: Leslie Darcy Robert Donaldson
- Date of birth: 30 July 1922
- Place of birth: Glasgow, Scotland
- Date of death: 8 January 1995 (aged 72)
- Place of death: Rhyl, Denbighshire, Wales
- Position: Inside forward

Senior career*
Years	Team	Apps	(Gls)
1943–1946	Heart of Midlothian		
1946–1948	Clyde	5	(1)
1948–1950	Rhyl		
1950–1952	Wrexham	30	(6)
- Holyhead Town
- * Club domestic league appearances and goals

Leslie Darcy Robert Donaldson (30 July 1922 – 8 January 1995) was a Scottish professional footballer who played as an inside-forward. He made appearances in the English Football League with Wrexham, and also played in the Scottish League for Heart of Midlothian and Clyde.
