= Charles Bumstead =

English footballer (1922–1974)

Personal information
- Full name: Charles Henry Bumstead
- Date of birth: 8 January 1922
- Place of birth: Croydon, England
- Date of death: 6 May 1974 (aged 52)
- Place of death: Lambeth, England
- Position: Goalkeeper

Senior career*
| Years | Team | Apps | (Gls) |
| 1946–1948 | Millwall | 12 | (0) |
| 1948–1951 | Crystal Palace | 53 | (0) |
| 1951–1953 | Dover Town | ? | (?) |
| 1953–1954 | Bedford Town | ? | (0) |
- * Club domestic league appearances and goals

Charles Henry Bumstead (8 January 1922 – 6 May 1974) was an English professional footballer who played as a goalkeeper in the Football League for Millwall and Crystal Palace. He also played non-league football for Dover Town and Bedford Town.

== Playing career ==
Bumstead was born in Croydon, and began his career with Millwall, making 12 appearances between 1946 and 1948. In August 1948, he signed for Crystal Palace but did not make his debut until December, in a 1–0 home defeat to Newport County, going on to make 16 appearances that season. Dick Graham was the first-choice 'keeper at the time and Bumstead was restricted to three games in 1949–50, but made 24 appearances in 1950–51 when Graham's career was coming to an end. Graham retired through injury in 1951 and Bumstead began the next season as first-choice, but played only 10 times before signing for Dover Town (a forerunner of Dover Athletic) in November that year. He had made 53 League appearances (55 in all competitions) for Palace.

== Later career ==
Bumstead signed for Bedford Town in 1953 and went on to make 87 appearances in all competitions for the club. By 1957–58 he was known to have retired as a player and was youth team coach at Millwall.

Charles Bumstead died in 1974 aged 52.
