= Dougald Campbell =

Scottish footballer

Personal information
- Full name: Dougald Campbell
- Date of birth: 14 December 1922
- Place of birth: Kirkintilloch, Scotland
- Date of death: 9 April 1996 (aged 73)
- Place of death: Victoria, British Columbia, Canada
- Height: 5 ft 10 in (1.78 m)
- Position: Right winger

Senior career*
Years	Team	Apps	(Gls)
1948–1949	Queens Park Rangers	0	(0)
1949–1950	Crewe Alexandra	33	(0)
1950–1951	Barrow	29	(3)
1951–1952	Grimsby Town	6	(0)
1952–195?	Peterborough United		
- * Club domestic league appearances and goals

Dougald Campbell (14 December 1922 – 9 April 1996) was a Scottish professional footballer who played as a right winger. He died in Victoria, British Columbia, Canada in April 1996 at the age of 73.
