= Don Kelly (footballer) =

English footballer (1922–2009)

Donald Joseph Kelly (2 July 1922 – 24 May 2009) was an English professional footballer who played in the Football League for Torquay United.

Don Kelly, a centre-forward born in Market Harborough, began his career as an amateur with Coventry City, but joined Torquay United for the resumption of league football in 1946. He scored twice on his debut, a 2–2 draw away to Reading on 11 September 1946, but made only three further appearances that season. Kelly had remained an amateur when joining Torquay, but turned professional in July 1947. However, due to the form of Jack Conley, he was to play just once the following season, scoring in the 2–0 win away to local rivals Exeter City on 17 January 1948.

He left Torquay and league football at the end of the season, joining Symington's. From there he moved to Stafford Rangers where he was top scorer in the 1949–50, 1950–51 and 1951–52 seasons. He later returned to play for Symington's and subsequently moved to Rugby Town where he ended his career.
