= Liverpool F.C.–Manchester City F.C. rivalry =

English football club rivalry

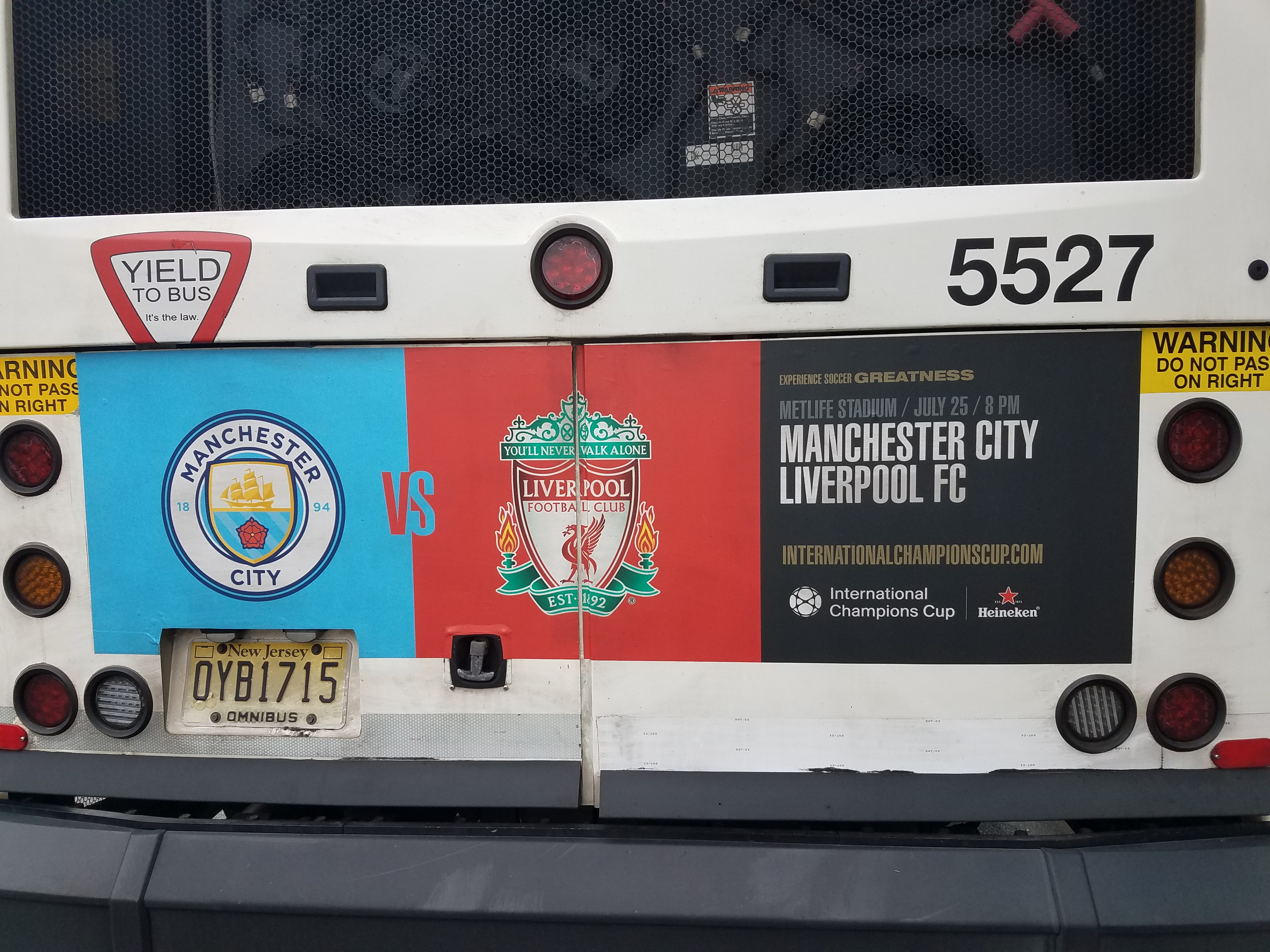
- American bus poster promoting the fixture in the International Champions Cup of 2018
- Location: North West England
- Teams: Liverpool; Manchester City
- First meeting: 16 September 1893; Football League Second Division; Ardwick 0–1 Liverpool
- Latest meeting: 11 October 2026; Premier League; Liverpool 0–3 Manchester City
- Next meeting: 8 May 2027; Premier League; Manchester City v Liverpool
- Stadiums: Anfield (Liverpool); Etihad Stadium (Manchester City)

Statistics
- Total meetings: 202
- All-time series: Liverpool: 95; Drawn: 53; Manchester City: 54
- Largest victory: Liverpool 6–0 Manchester City (28 October 1995); Manchester City 6–0 Liverpool (11 September 1935)
- Largest goal scoring: Liverpool 5–4 Manchester City (27 October 1906)
- Longest win streak: 7 games Liverpool (1978–1981)
- Longest unbeaten streak: 10 games Liverpool (2005–2010)
- Current win streak: 4 games Manchester City (2025–present)
- Current unbeaten streak: 4 games Manchester City (2025–present)

The Liverpool F.C.–Manchester City F.C. rivalry is an inter-city rivalry between English professional football clubs Liverpool and Manchester City. Liverpool play their home games at Anfield, while Manchester City play their home games at the Etihad Stadium.

Although Liverpool and Manchester City were first involved in a title race in the 1976–77 season, their modern-day rivalry began in the mid-2010s, since which time the clubs have been in three close title races with each other and reached five UEFA Champions League finals, winning one each. Between the 2017–18 season and the 2024–25 season, during which time Liverpool were managed by Jürgen Klopp and Arne Slot, and Manchester City by Pep Guardiola, the two clubs dominated English football, with one of the two winning every Premier League title, three out of eight FA Cups, six out of eight EFL Cups, and one UEFA Champions League title each. During this period, the two clubs set six of the eight highest Premier League points totals since 1995, when the number of games for each team per season was reduced to 38. Players and managers from Liverpool and City also dominated the individual awards in English football in this period: every Premier League Player of the Season, PFA Players' Player of the Year and FWA Footballer of the Year awards, and all but one Premier League Young Player of the Season award, went to players from the two clubs, and all Premier League Manager of the Season award went to the manager of either club.

The quality of the rivalry has been praised, with pundit and former Liverpool and England player Jamie Carragher describing it in 2022 as "the best we've ever had in English football... We've never had the two best teams and managers in the world together fighting it out." In 2022, the BBC noted that the two clubs "have produced a rivalry in recent years that has taken the standard of English football to another level."

== Inter-city rivalry ==
Locations of the cities, in England

The cities of Liverpool and Manchester are located in the north west of England, 35 miles (56 km) apart. Since the industrial revolution there has been a consistent theme of rivalry between the two cities based around economic and industrial competition. Manchester through to the 18th century was the far more populous city, and held a position of significance and notability as representative of the north. By the late 18th century, Liverpool had grown as a major sea port – critical to the growth and success of the northern cotton mills. Over the next century, Liverpool grew to supersede Manchester and throughout the late 19th and early 20th century was often described as the British Empire's second city. The links between the two cities were strengthened with the construction of the Bridgewater Canal, the Mersey and Irwell Navigation, and the world's first inter-city railway, the Liverpool and Manchester Railway, for the transport of raw materials inland.

The construction of the Manchester Ship Canal, funded by Manchester merchants, was opposed by Liverpool politicians and bred resentment between the two cities. Tension between working class Liverpool dockers and labourers in Manchester was heightened after its completion in 1894, just three months prior to the first meeting between Liverpool and Newton Heath in a play-off match that would see Newton Heath relegated to the Second Division.

Today, the crests of both the city of Manchester and Manchester City include stylised ships representing the Manchester Ship Canal and Manchester's trade roots. The ship is also included on the crest of many other Mancunian institutions such as Manchester City Council and rivals Manchester United.

Post-war shifts in economic ties, reliance on regional coal, and shifts in transatlantic trade patterns caused by the growth of Asian labour markets caused the gradual decline of British manufacturing. While the city of Liverpool suffered the loss of its primary source of income to southern port cities, Manchester maintained some of its manufacturing heritage. This reversal of fortunes happened against the backdrop of shifting political backgrounds and significant events in British culture and society in the second half of the 20th century.

Both cities were part of the county of Lancashire until March 1974, upon the enactment of the Local Government Act 1972. Since then, Liverpool and Manchester each respectively anchor the neighbouring metropolitan counties of Merseyside and Greater Manchester.

The two cities continue to be strong regional rivals, vying for influence of surrounding areas. Their continued importance to the UK economy has been reflected with the awarding of the 2002 Commonwealth Games to Manchester, while Liverpool was awarded the title of 2008 European Capital of Culture as part of its ongoing regeneration.

More recent projects by Peel Ports have sought to re-establish the economic links between the Port of Liverpool and Port of Manchester, including re-developing trade links via the Manchester Ship Canal.

== Football rivalry ==
Liverpool and Manchester City were not traditional rivals, with Liverpool having had much more success historically. At the time of the Abu Dhabi United Group takeover of City in 2008, Liverpool had won five European Cups, a record eighteen domestic top-flight league titles, seven FA cups and a record seven Football League Cups; City, conversely had won zero European Cups, two domestic top-flight league titles, four FA Cups and two Football League Cups. By 2008, however, neither team were dominant domestically, with Liverpool having not won a top-flight league title since 1990, and City since 1968.

The modern rivalry began in the 2013–14 Premier League season. Liverpool, under Brendan Rodgers, and Manchester City, in their first season under Manuel Pellegrini, engaged in a three-way title race with Jose Mourinho's Chelsea, with each team leading at various points in the season. Ultimately, City won the title on the last day of the season, finishing two points ahead of Liverpool.

Neither Liverpool nor Manchester City made a serious challenge for the league title in the next three seasons, though during the 2015–16 season – Liverpool's first under manager Jürgen Klopp – the two met in the final of the League Cup. After a 1–1 draw in normal time and no goals scored in extra time, City won the penalty shoot-out 3–1.

In the 2017–18 season, Manchester City – now managed by Pep Guardiola – comfortably won the league title with a top-flight record of 100 points, as well as winning the League Cup. They met Liverpool in the quarter-finals of the Champions League, with Liverpool winning 5–1 on aggregate. Liverpool would go on to reach the Champions League final, losing to Real Madrid.

In the 2018–19 season, the rivalry between the two clubs reached new heights, as both Liverpool and Manchester City were involved in a very close title race. City won the league title on the final day, finishing on 98 points to Liverpool's 97 – the third- and fourth- highest points totals in English top-flight history. City also won the 2018–19 FA Cup and League Cup for an unprecedented 'domestic treble', while Liverpool won their English record-extending sixth European Cup with victory over Tottenham Hotspur in the final.

In the 2019–20 season, Manchester City defeated Liverpool on penalties in the 2019 FA Community Shield and also won their third League Cup in a row. Liverpool, however, dominated the league season, and after City's defeat to Chelsea in June, Liverpool mathematically won their nineteenth league title (and first in the Premier League era), finishing on 99 points, the second-highest total in English top-flight history. City finished in second, 18 points behind.

In the 2020–21 season, Liverpool had a less successful season, losing many key players to injury. Manchester City won the league title comfortably, along with their fourth League Cup in a row. They also reached their first European Cup final, losing to Chelsea.

In the 2021–22 season, Liverpool and Manchester City were once more involved in a close title race. City again won the league title on the final day, finishing on 93 points to Liverpool's 92. Liverpool won the League Cup and the FA Cup, knocking City out in the semi-finals of the latter competition. They also reached the final of the Champions League, losing again to Real Madrid.

In the 2022–23 season, Liverpool beat Manchester City 3–1 in the 2022 FA Community Shield, but could not repeat the previous season's form in the league, ultimately finishing fifth. City enjoyed their most successful season to date, becoming just the second English side to win a 'continental treble' – the Premier League, FA Cup and their first Champions League, which they won by defeating Inter Milan in the final. They also knocked Liverpool out in the fourth round of the League Cup, before being knocked out themselves in the quarter-finals.

In the 2023-24 season, City won their record fourth consecutive league title after a close race with Arsenal. Klopp announced in January that this would be his final season with Liverpool, who won their record-extending tenth League Cup.

In the 2024–25 season, Liverpool won their record-equalling twentieth English top flight league title under new manager Arne Slot. City did not win a major trophy for the first time since the 2016–17 season, despite doing slightly better by winning the Community Shield.

In the 2025–26 season, for the first time since the 2016–17 season neither of them won the Premier League title. Arsenal won the league for the first time in 22 years instead. Manchester City won the League Cup and the FA Cup in what was Guardiola's last season at Manchester City.

It was in this season that the Premier League Player of the Season, FWA Footballer of the Year, PFA Players' Player of the Year, and Premier League Manager of the Season awards were not won by players of either club. However, City won the Premier League Young Player of the Season award through Nico O'Reilly.

== Rivalry between managers ==
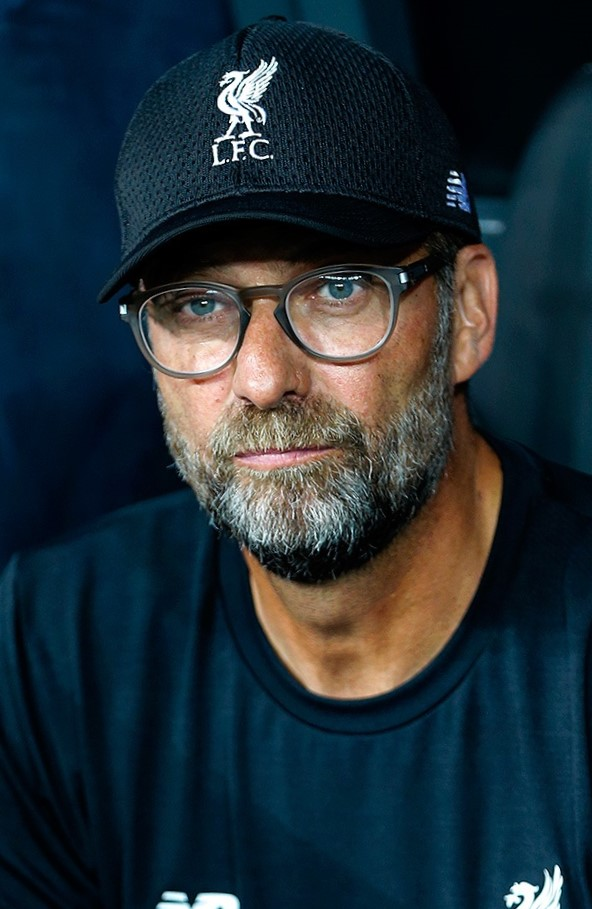
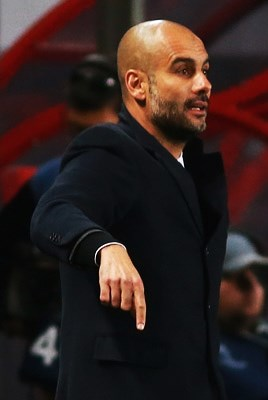
Jürgen Klopp and Pep Guardiola, rival managers since their days partaking in Der Klassiker of Germany. Klopp took charge at Anfield in 2015, while Guardiola became City boss the following year.

A large part of the rivalry between Liverpool and Manchester City which has developed since the late 2010s has been that of the rivalry of their managers, Jürgen Klopp and Pep Guardiola respectively.

Though the majority of journalism on the rivalry of the two has been around their time in England, it was formed originally in Germany. With Guardiola managing Bayern Munich and Klopp leading Borussia Dortmund — collectively the two most successful German clubs, contesting a rivalry known as Der Klassiker — the two faced off eight times in under two years, including three cup finals. They each won four of those eight matches, with Klopp taking two of the three trophies they contested. Both men would move directly from Germany to England at the end of their contracts; Klopp joined Liverpool on 8 October 2015, while on 1 February 2016 it was announced that Guardiola would join City for the 2016–17 season.

At the end of the 2018–19 season, Guardiola described his relationship with Klopp as a "beautiful rivalry" and called Klopp's Liverpool team "the strongest opponents I have faced in my career as a manager". In September 2019, Klopp hailed Guardiola for being his 'greatest rival ever', after both the two were nominated for the FIFA Men's Coach of the Year award in 2019, which Klopp won.

=== Tactical contrast ===
The two managers approached the game from opposite directions. Klopp's Liverpool pressed high, won the ball back quickly and attacked at speed, while Guardiola's City kept possession and worked the ball through carefully arranged positions. Over the years, each side changed in response to the other: Guardiola reshaped his team to survive Liverpool's press, and Klopp's later sides became more patient and controlled with the ball.

=== Notable meetings ===
Liverpool won the first of the rivalry's landmark games, beating City 4–3 at Anfield on 14 January 2018. It was City's first domestic defeat of the 2017–18 season. A few months later, Liverpool knocked City out of the Champions League quarter-finals.

City returned the favour a year later. Their 2–1 win at the Etihad Stadium on 3 January 2019 was Liverpool's first defeat of the 2018–19 season.

Neither side could beat the other in the league in 2021–22. The match at Anfield on 3 October 2021 finished 2–2, and so did the return fixture at the Etihad on 10 April 2022, which left City just one point clear at the top. The teams met again six days later in the FA Cup semi-final at Wembley Stadium, where Liverpool won 3–2.

=== End of the managerial rivalry ===
In January 2024, Klopp announced that he would leave Liverpool at the end of the season. Guardiola responded by calling him "the best rival I ever had in my life". The two managers faced each other in the Premier League for the last time on 10 March 2024, a 1–1 draw at Anfield.

== Reaction ==
Journalists and pundits have praised the quality of Liverpool and Manchester City's rivalry. Pundit and former Liverpool and England player Jamie Carragher describing it in 2022 as "the best we’ve ever had in English football... We've never had the two best teams and managers in the world together fighting it out." Pundit and former England player Gary Neville described it as "an exceptional rivalry in the terms of excellence and consistency". In the same year, the BBC noted that the two clubs "have produced a rivalry in recent years that has taken the standard of English football to another level." In 2023, the Manchester Evening News noted the particularly "heated" and "hostile" nature of the rivalry, and that "the clashes between the two clubs were now becoming season defining".

Current players for the two clubs have also commented on the rivalry with each other. In 2023, Manchester City player Rodri said that "The rivalry is always there, no matter what the situation is of each team. It has always been a big rivalry in the last few years".

A survey conducted in 2019 found that a large number of City fans consider Liverpool, not Manchester United, to be their club's biggest rivals. However, a survey conducted in 2023 found that Liverpool fans consider Manchester City to be their third biggest rivals, behind Manchester United and Chelsea, but ahead of Everton.

A 19-year-old man, Kian Holt, was charged with tragedy chanting following a Premier League match between Liverpool and Manchester City at Anfield on 1 December 2024. Eight other men were also arrested on similar charges but released on bail. The chants referenced the 1989 Hillsborough disaster, which claimed 97 Liverpool fans' lives.

== Honours ==
As of 16 May 2026

Team	League	FA Cup	League Cup	Community Shield	FL Super Cup	European Cup/ Champions League	UEFA Cup Winners' Cup	UEFA Cup/ Europa League	UEFA Super Cup	FIFA Club World Cup	Total
Liverpool	20	8	10	16	1	6	0	3	4	1	69
Manchester City	10	8	8	7	0	1	1	0	1	1	37
Combined	30	16	18	23	1	7	1	3	5	2	106

== Head-to-head ==
The below table demonstrates the competitive results, excluding extra time/penalties, between the two sides (not indicative of titles won). League includes the Premier League, League Division One and League Division Two. The Lancashire Section and the War Leagues are not included.

As of 11 October 2026

Competition	Played	Liverpool wins	Draws	Manchester City wins
Premier League	59	23	21	15
First Division	118	59	25	34
Second Division	4	3	1	0
FA Cup	9	4	2	3
EFL Cup	8	3	3	2
UEFA Champions League	2	2	0	0
FA Community Shield	2	1	1	0
Total	202	95	53	54

== Matches ==
The table below shows the matches played between Liverpool and Manchester City, separated by home, as in matches played in Liverpool's home stadium (Anfield) are shown in the left hand table and matches played at Manchester City's home stadium (following a nomadic embryonic existence, City resided at Hyde Road from 1887 to 1923, then Maine Road until 2003, and finally the City of Manchester Stadium from the 2003–04 season onwards) are shown on the right. Cup finals are typically played at a neutral location such as the England national football team home stadium (Wembley).

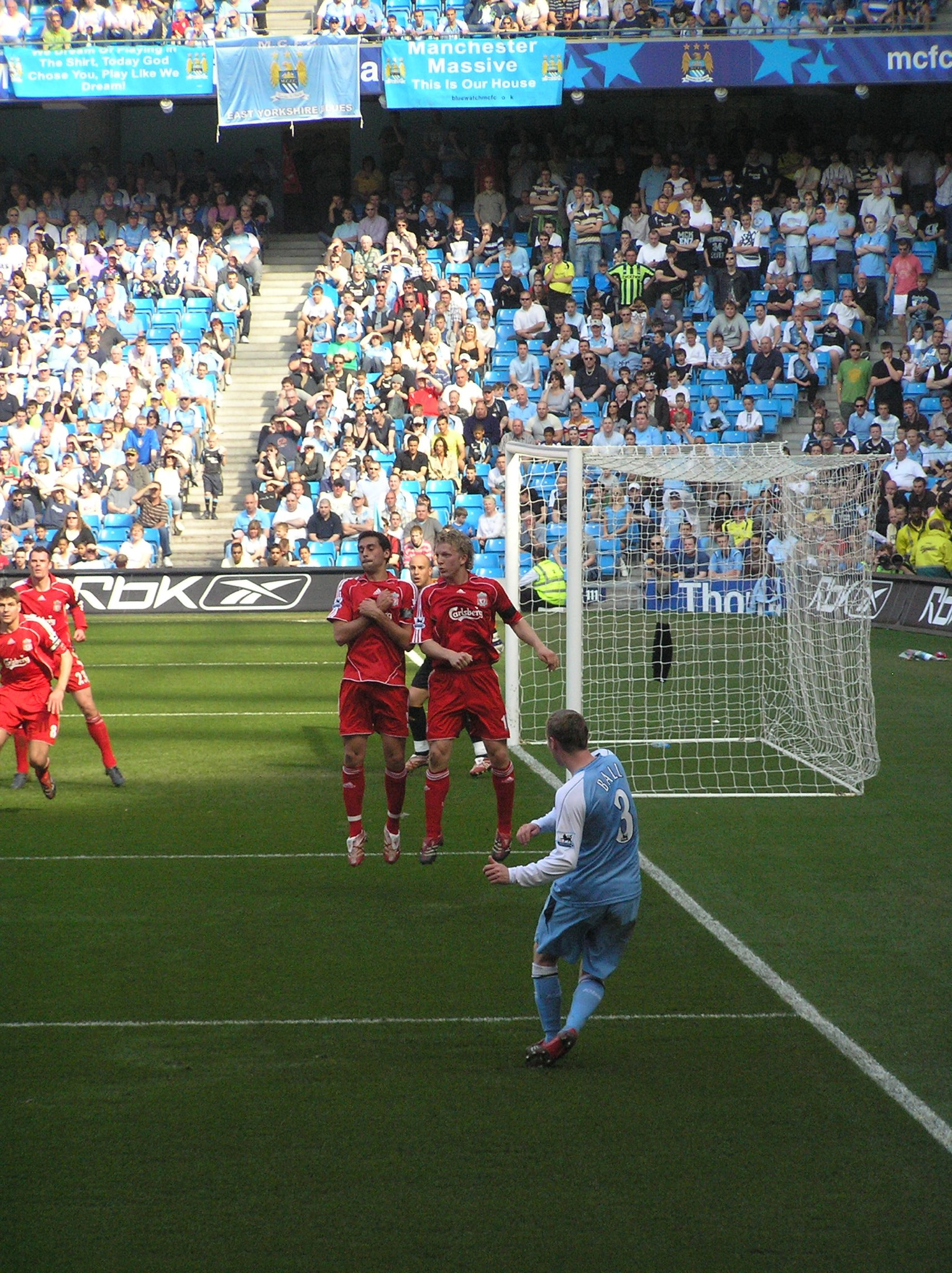
City's Michael Ball takes a free kick against Liverpool in the Premier League match in April 2007, at the City of Manchester Stadium.

Liverpool at home
Date	Score	Competition
1 January 1896	3–1	League Division Two
3 March 1900	5–2	League Division One
13 April 1901	3–1	League Division One
1 March 1902	4–0	League Division One
27 February 1904	2–2	League Division One
3 March 1906	0–1	League Division One
27 October 1906	5–4	League Division One
14 March 1908	0–1	League Division One
28 November 1908	1–3	League Division One
28 January 1911	1–1	League Division One
9 September 1911	2–2	League Division One
21 September 1912	1–2	League Division One
25 December 1913	4–2	League Division One
13 March 1915	3–2	League Division One
11 September 1915	0–1	Lancashire Section - Principal Tournament
15 April 1916	0–2	Lancashire Section - Subsidiary Tournament (South)
10 March 1917	3–0	Lancashire Section - Principal Tournament
10 November 1917	2–0	Lancashire Section - Principal Tournament
23 November 1918	2–0	Lancashire Section - Principal Tournament
20 March 1920	1–0	League Division One
28 August 1920	4–2	League Division One
31 August 1921	3–2	League Division One
24 March 1923	2–0	League Division One
26 January 1924	0–0	League Division One
13 September 1924	5–3	League Division One
17 October 1925	2–1	League Division One
4 May 1929	1–1	League Division One
26 October 1929	1–6	League Division One
1 November 1930	0–2	League Division One
21 November 1931	4–3	League Division One
11 March 1933	1–1	League Division One
2 May 1934	3–2	League Division One
5 September 1934	2–1	League Division One
4 September 1935	0–2	League Division One
26 March 1937	0–5	League Division One
26 March 1938	2–0	League Division One
25 May 1940	3–2	West Region War League
19 October 1940	0–4	North Region War League
20 September 1941	4–2	North Region War League
31 October 1942	3–1	North Region War League
20 February 1943	4–2	North Region War League (Second Championship)
28 August 1943	4–1	North Region War League
25 March 1944	2–2	North Region War League (Second Championship)
9 September 1944	2–2	North Region War League
7 April 1945	3–0	North Region War League (Second Championship)
27 October 1945	0–5	North Region War League
17 April 1948	1–1	League Division One
9 April 1949	0–1	League Division One
5 November 1949	4–0	League Division One
14 April 1952	1–2	League Division One
17 January 1953	0–1	League Division One
7 November 1953	2–2	League Division One
22 February 1956	1–2	FA Cup
29 August 1962	4–1	League Division One
30 August 1966	3–2	League Division One
16 December 1967	1–1	League Division One
10 August 1968	2–1	League Division One
12 August 1969	3–2	League Division One
12 January 1971	0–0	League Division One
26 February 1972	3–0	League Division One
12 August 1972	2–0	League Division One
3 February 1973	0–0	FA Cup
16 April 1974	4–0	League Division One
26 December 1974	4–1	League Division One
27 December 1975	1–0	League Division One
9 April 1977	2–1	League Division One
1 May 1978	4–0	League Division One
18 November 1978	1–0	League Division One
11 March 1980	2–0	League Division One
10 February 1981	1–1	League Cup
19 May 1981	1–0	League Division One
26 December 1981	1–3	League Division One
27 December 1982	5–2	League Division One
31 March 1986	2–0	League Division One
25 August 1986	0–0	League Division One
19 August 1989	3–1	League Division One
24 November 1990	2–2	League Division One
21 December 1991	2–2	League Division One
28 December 1992	1–1	Premier League
22 January 1994	2–1	Premier League
28 December 1994	2–0	Premier League
25 October 1995	4–0	League Cup
28 October 1995	6–0	Premier League
9 September 2000	3–2	Premier League
18 February 2001	4–2	FA Cup
3 May 2003	1–2	Premier League
11 February 2004	2–1	Premier League
21 August 2004	2–1	Premier League
26 February 2006	1–0	Premier League
25 November 2006	1–0	Premier League
4 May 2008	1–0	Premier League
22 February 2009	1–1	Premier League
21 November 2009	2–2	Premier League
11 April 2011	3–0	Premier League
27 November 2011	1–1	Premier League
25 January 2012	2–2	League Cup
26 August 2012	2–2	Premier League
13 April 2014	3–2	Premier League
1 March 2015	2–1	Premier League
2 March 2016	3–0	Premier League
31 December 2016	1–0	Premier League
14 January 2018	4–3	Premier League
4 April 2018	3–0	UEFA Champions League
7 October 2018	0–0	Premier League
10 November 2019	3–1	Premier League
7 February 2021	1–4	Premier League
3 October 2021	2–2	Premier League
16 October 2022	1–0	Premier League
10 March 2024	1–1	Premier League
1 December 2024	2–0	Premier League
8 February 2026	1–2	Premier League
11 October 2026	0–3	Premier League

Manchester City at home
Date	Score	Competition
3 April 1896	1–1	League Division Two
28 October 1899	0–1	League Division One
8 December 1900	3–4	League Division One
2 November 1901	2–3	League Division One
31 October 1903	3–2	League Division One
28 October 1905	0–1	League Division One
2 March 1907	1–0	League Division One
16 November 1907	1–1	League Division One
3 April 1909	4–0	League Division One
24 September 1910	1–2	League Division One
6 January 1912	2–3	League Division One
18 January 1913	4–1	League Division One
26 December 1913	1–0	League Division One
5 December 1914	1–1	League Division One
11 December 1915	1–2	Lancashire Section - Principal Tournament
11 March 1916	1–1	Lancashire Section - Subsidiary Tournament (South)
25 November 1916	1–1	Lancashire Section - Principal Tournament
17 November 1917	1–1	Lancashire Section - Principal Tournament
16 November 1918	0–2	Lancashire Section - Principal Tournament
27 March 1920	2–1	League Division One
4 September 1920	3–2	League Division One
7 September 1921	1–1	League Division One
17 March 1923	1–0	League Division One
19 January 1924	0–1	League Division One
17 January 1925	5–0	League Division One
27 February 1926	1–1	League Division One
22 December 1928	2–3	League Division One
1 March 1930	4–3	League Division One
7 March 1931	1–1	League Division One
2 April 1932	0–1	League Division One
29 October 1932	1–1	League Division One
16 December 1933	2–1	League Division One
29 August 1934	3–1	League Division One
11 September 1935	6–0	League Division One
29 March 1937	5–1	League Division One
13 November 1937	1–3	League Division One
6 January 1940	3–7	West Region War League
9 November 1940	5–1	North Region War League
13 September 1941	3–4	North Region War League
24 October 1942	1–4	North Region War League
27 February 1943	3–1	North Region War League (Second Championship)
4 September 1943	2–1	North Region War League
18 March 1944	1–1	North Region War League (Second Championship)
16 September 1944	2–2	North Region War League
14 April 1945	1–3	North Region War League (Second Championship)
20 October 1945	1–0	North Region War League
29 November 1947	2–0	League Division One
13 November 1948	2–4	League Division One
29 March 1950	1–2	League Division One
11 April 1952	1–2	League Division One
6 September 1952	0–2	League Division One
7 April 1954	0–2	League Division One
18 February 1956	0–0	FA Cup
22 August 1962	2–2	League Division One
24 August 1966	2–1	League Division One
19 August 1967	0–0	League Division One
12 May 1969	1–0	League Division One
20 August 1969	0–2	League Division One
24 September 1969	3–2	League Cup
26 April 1971	2–2	League Division One
1 September 1971	1–0	League Division One
7 February 1973	2–0	FA Cup
17 February 1973	1–1	League Division One
12 April 1974	1–1	League Division One
14 September 1974	2–0	League Division One
19 April 1976	0–3	League Division One
29 December 1976	1–1	League Division One
29 October 1977	3–1	League Division One
26 August 1978	1–4	League Division One
27 October 1979	0–4	League Division One
4 October 1980	0–3	League Division One
14 January 1981	0–1	League Cup
10 April 1982	0–5	League Division One
4 April 1983	0–4	League Division One
26 December 1985	1–0	League Division One
17 January 1987	0–1	League Division One
13 March 1988	0–4	FA Cup
2 December 1989	1–4	League Division One
9 March 1991	0–3	League Division One
21 August 1991	2–1	League Division One
12 April 1993	1–1	Premier League
23 October 1993	1–1	Premier League
14 April 1995	2–1	Premier League
5 May 1996	2–2	Premier League
31 January 2001	1–1	Premier League
28 September 2002	0–3	Premier League
5 January 2003	0–1	FA Cup
28 December 2003	2–2	Premier League
9 April 2005	1–0	Premier League
26 November 2005	0–1	Premier League
14 April 2007	0–0	Premier League
30 December 2007	0–0	Premier League
5 October 2008	2–3	Premier League
21 February 2010	0–0	Premier League
23 August 2010	3–0	Premier League
3 January 2012	3–0	Premier League
11 January 2012	0–1	League Cup
3 February 2013	2–2	Premier League
26 December 2013	2–1	Premier League
25 August 2014	3–1	Premier League
21 November 2015	1–4	Premier League
19 March 2017	1–1	Premier League
9 September 2017	5–0	Premier League
10 April 2018	1–2	UEFA Champions League
3 January 2019	2–1	Premier League
2 July 2020	4–0	Premier League
8 November 2020	1–1	Premier League
10 April 2022	2–2	Premier League
22 December 2022	3–2	EFL Cup
1 April 2023	4–1	Premier League
25 November 2023	1–1	Premier League
23 February 2025	0–2	Premier League
9 November 2025	3–0	Premier League
4 April 2026	4–0	FA Cup
8 May 2027		Premier League

At neutral venues
Date	Team 1	Score	Team 2	Competition	Venue
28 February 2016	Liverpool	1–1 (a.e.t.) (1–3 p)	Manchester City	League Cup	Wembley Stadium
4 August 2019	Liverpool	1–1 (4–5 p)	Manchester City	FA Community Shield	Wembley Stadium
16 April 2022	Manchester City	2–3	Liverpool	FA Cup	Wembley Stadium
30 July 2022	Liverpool	3–1	Manchester City	FA Community Shield	King Power Stadium

== Shared player history ==
Player	Liverpool career			Manchester City career		
Player	Span	League apps	League goals	Span	League apps	League goals
(Scotland) Jim McBride	1892–1894	50	7	1894–1897	70	1
(England) Pat Finnerhan	1897–1898	8	5	1894–1897	85	27
(Scotland) Jimmy Ross	1894–1896	73	27	1898–1901	67	21
(England) George Livingstone	1902–1903	31	4	1903–1906	81	19
(England) Augustus Beeby	1912–1912	16	4	1911–1912	11	0
(England) Tommy Johnson	1934–1936	36	8	1919–1930	328	158
(Scotland) Matt Busby	1936–1945	115	3	1928–1936	204	11
(England) Fred Howe	1935–1938	89	36	1938	6	5
(England) David Johnson	1976–1982	148	55	1984	6	1
(England) Michael Robinson	1983–1984	30	6	1979–1980	30	8
(England) Mark Seagraves	1983–1987	0	0	1987–1990	42	0
(England) Paul Walsh	1984–1988	77	25	1994–1995	53	16
(England) Steve McMahon	1985–1991	204	29	1991–1994	87	1
(England) Peter Beardsley	1987–1991	131	46	1998	6	0
(England) Paul Stewart	1992–1996	32	1	1987–1988	51	26
(England) Steve McManaman	1990–1999	272	46	2003–2005	35	0
(England) David James	1992–1999	214	0	2004–2006	93	0
(England) Nigel Clough	1993–1996	39	7	1996–1998	39	4
(England) Robbie Fowler	1993–2001; 2006–2007	266	128	2003–2006	80	21
(Republic of Ireland) Mark Kennedy	1995–1998	16	0	1999–2001	66	8
(Germany) Dietmar Hamann	1999–2006	191	8	2006–2009	54	1
(France) Nicolas Anelka	2001–2002	20	4	2002–2005	89	37
(England) Scott Carson	2005–2008	4	0	2019–2025	1	0
(Spain) Albert Riera	2008–2010	40	3	2006	15	1
(Wales) Craig Bellamy	2006–2007; 2011–2012	51	13	2009–2011	40	12
(England) Daniel Sturridge	2013–2019	116	50	2006–2009	21	5
(Ivory Coast) Kolo Touré	2013–2016	46	1	2009–2013	82	2
(England) James Milner	2015–2023	230	19	2010–2015	147	13
(Italy) Mario Balotelli	2014–2016	16	1	2010–2013	54	20
(Germany) Loris Karius	2016–2021	29	0	2011–2012	0	0
(England) Raheem Sterling	2012–2015	95	18	2015–2022	225	91

== See also ==
- List of association football club rivalries in Europe
- 1915 British football betting scandal
- Liverpool–Manchester rivalry
