= Paddy Waters (footballer) =

Irish footballer

Patrick Mary Waters (31 January 1922 – 2 March 2004) was an Irish soccer player during the 1940s and 1950s.

Waters began his career at Donore before moving to Bohemians in 1941. Paddy was a member of the 1945 Bohemian Inter City Cup winning team against Belfast Celtic at Dalymount Park. He made 117 senior appearances for the club and scored 13 goals.

In 1946 he moved to Glentoran and from there to Preston North End. He spent 3 years at Deepdale before moving to Carlisle United under the management of his former Preston team-mate, Bill Shankly. Shankly once said of Waters that "he could run like a hare, and tackle like a bear, he was as good a defender as there was." Waters retired from professional football in February 1958.

== Honours ==
- Inter City Cup
  - Bohemians - 1945
