= Stan Tolliday =

English footballer

Personal information
- Full name: Stanley Albert Tolliday
- Date of birth: 6 August 1922
- Place of birth: Hackney, England
- Date of death: 26 June 1951 (aged 28)
- Place of death: Northampton, England
- Position: Goalkeeper

Senior career*
| Years | Team | Apps | (Gls) |
| 1946–1948 | Leyton Orient | 68 | (0) |
| 1950–1951 | Walsall | 0 | (0) |
- * Club domestic league appearances and goals

Stanley Albert Tolliday (6 August 1922 – 26 June 1951) was an English professional footballer who played as a goalkeeper in the Football League for Leyton Orient and Walsall. Tolliday died in a lorry accident in 1951.
