= Alfred Thompson (footballer, died 1922) =

English footballer

Personal information
- Date of birth: 1891
- Place of birth: Padiham, England
- Date of death: 5 July 1922 (aged 30–31)
- Height: 5 ft 10 in (1.78 m)
- Position: Forward

Senior career*
Years	Team	Apps	(Gls)
1911–1912	Grimsby Rovers		
1912–1913	Grimsby Town	0	(0)
1913–1914	Grimsby Rovers		
1914–1920	Grimsby Town	3	(1)
1920–1921	Cleethorpes Town		
1921–1922	Charlton's		
- * Club domestic league appearances and goals

Alfred Thompson (1891 – 5 July 1922) was an English professional footballer who played as a forward.
