= Jimmy Carmichael (footballer) =

Scottish footballer

Personal information
- Date of birth: 14 December 1894
- Place of birth: Bridgeton, Scotland
- Date of death: 1967 (aged 72–73)
- Height: 5 ft 9 1/2 in (1.77 m)
- Position: Forward

Senior career*
Years	Team	Apps	(Gls)
- Strathclyde
- Mid Rhondda
1920–1926	Grimsby Town	227	(137)
- Worksop Town
- * Club domestic league appearances and goals

James Carmichael (14 December 1894 – 1967) was a Scottish footballer who played in the Football League for Grimsby Town.
