= 1924–25 Gillingham F.C. season =

English football club season

Gillingham
1924–25 season
- Chairman: Jack Knight
- Manager: Harry Curtis
- Third Division South: 13th
- FA Cup: Sixth qualifying round
- Top goalscorer: League: Frank Marshall (9); All: Frank Marshall (11)
- Highest home attendance: 9,000 vs Barrow (13 December 1924)
- Lowest home attendance: 1,000 vs Luton Town (27 December 1924)
Home colours

During the 1924–25 English football season, Gillingham F.C. competed in the Football League Third Division South, the third tier of the English football league system. It was the fifth season in which the club competed in the Football League. The team began the season in poor form, scoring only two goals in the first seven games of the campaign, after which they were in 22nd and last place in the league table. In November and December, however, they achieved five wins in nine games and had risen to 15th place by the end of 1924. In the second half of the season, Gillingham again struggled to score goals, at one point scoring only once in a run of seven games. Despite this, a sequence of five games without defeat in the closing weeks of the campaign helped Gillingham to finish the season in 13th place, meaning that they had improved their final position for a fourth consecutive season.

Gillingham also competed in the FA Cup, reaching the sixth and final qualifying round; they were defeated by Barrow in a match that had to be replayed four times before Barrow emerged victorious after a total of nine hours of football. Gillingham played 49 competitive matches during the season, winning 14, drawing 18, and losing 17. Frank Marshall made the most appearances, being absent for only one game, and was also top goalscorer with 11 goals. The highest recorded attendance at the club's home ground, Priestfield Road, was 9,000 for the first FA Cup match against Barrow.

== Background and pre-season ==
The 1924–25 season was Gillingham's fifth season playing in the Football League. The club had been one of the founder members of the Third Division in 1920. A year later, the division was re-branded the Third Division South when a parallel Third Division North was created. Gillingham had finished in 22nd and last place in the league table at the end of their first season in the division, but improved their final position each season since; in the 1923–24 season, they had finished in 15th place.

Harry Curtis was the team's manager for a second season. He was the first Gillingham manager to be given full control of all team-related affairs; previously some of these matters had come under the remit of the club's secretary. The club also employed a Mr Kane as trainer. Gillingham signed a number of new players prior to the season, including four forwards: Frank Marshall and Thomas Wilkinson joined the club from the Scottish teams Shettleston and Maryhill respectively, and Fred Brown and George Chance were signed from fellow Third Division South clubs Brighton & Hove Albion and Bristol Rovers respectively. Two new half-backs also joined the club: Albert Hook from fellow Kent-based club Maidstone United and Charles Davis from Liverpool. The team wore Gillingham's usual kit of black and white striped shirts with white shorts and black socks. At the time, pre-season friendlies between Football League teams were not permitted, and clubs instead generally prepared for the season with a public trial match between two teams chosen from within their own squad of players. Gillingham staged such a match a week before the start of the season and Wilkinson and Brown each scored two goals as the "Probables" beat the "Possibles".

== Third Division South ==
=== August–December ===
Tommy Hall was the only player to score for Gillingham in the first seven games of the season.

Gillingham's first match of the season was away to Luton Town on 30 August; Marshall, Davis, Hook, Chance, Brown and Wilkinson all made their club debuts in a match which was played in heavy rain and ended in a goalless draw. Four days later, the team played their first game of the season at their home ground, Priestfield Road; a goal from Tommy Hall gave Gillingham a 1–0 victory over Brentford. The Daily Telegraph wrote that Gillingham could have scored more goals but that their forwards "lost many opportunities owing to over-eagerness". The victory was followed by a run of eight games without a win. Gillingham drew 0–0 at home to Watford on 6 September, again missing many goalscoring chances; the Athletic News said that if they had "won by three clear goals little surprise could have been felt". Gillingham played Brentford again on 8 September; Hall gave them the lead but Brentford scored twice to win. Gillingham finished the game with only ten players after Hook was injured.^{[a]} Following a goalless draw at home to Bournemouth & Boscombe Athletic, Gillingham lost 2–0 away to Brighton & Hove Albion and 3–0 at home to Plymouth Argyle. At the end of September, Gillingham were in 22nd and last place in the Third Division South league table; they had won only once in seven matches and recorded only two goals, both scored by Hall.

Gillingham's winless run continued in the first game of October with a 2–1 defeat away to Bristol City. The home team scored the winning goal in the final ten minutes; Freddie Fox, Gillingham's goalkeeper, appeared to have kept the ball out of the goal but, after being confronted by the Bristol City players in what the Western Daily Press called a "most discreditable scene", the referee consulted both linesmen and ruled that it had in fact crossed the goal line. A week later, Gillingham played Swindon Town; the Athletic News reported that "better football has seldom been seen played by Gillingham than during the opening half", but after leading at half-time Gillingham had to settle for a 1–1 draw. After a 2–1 defeat to Aberdare Athletic, Gillingham ended their winless run by beating Millwall 1–0 on 22 October with a goal from Hall. Gillingham lost 1–0 away to Northampton Town on 25 October, despite Fox saving a penalty kick, but began November by beating Charlton Athletic 2–0 at Priestfield Road. Brown scored both goals, the first time during the season that a Gillingham player had scored more than once in a game. It was the first in a run of five consecutive league games without defeat for the team. A goal from Hall secured a 1–1 draw with fellow strugglers Queens Park Rangers on 8 November, after which Gillingham were in 19th place in the league table.

On 15 November, Gillingham extended their unbeaten run to three games with a 2–1 victory over Merthyr Town. Brown and Marshall scored in the second half, although the Athletic News reported that Gillingham would have scored at least three times before half-time if their forwards had not "missed some easy chances". After a 1–0 victory away to Reading on 22 November, Gillingham were in 15th place. On 6 December, Gillingham conceded two early goals against Exeter City but Brown and Bill Berry scored to bring the scores level by half-time. Gillingham took the lead after the interval but Exeter scored again and the game ended in a 3–3 draw. The team's unbeaten run came to an end with a 2–0 defeat away to Newport County on 20 December. Beginning on 25 December, Gillingham played three games on consecutive days. On Christmas Day, they beat Southend United 3–1 at Priestfield Road, but a day later they lost 4–0 to the same opponents at the Kursaal in Southend. On 27 December, Gillingham won 4–1 at home to Luton Town; Len Ramsell scored twice, his only goals of the season. The Sunday Dispatch wrote that "the playing conditions were wretched" due to high winds; as a result no half-time break was taken. At the end of 1924, Gillingham were in 15th place in the Third Division South league table.

=== January–May ===
Gillingham's goalkeeper Freddie Fox conceded a goal in unusual circumstances in the first game of February.

Gillingham's first match of 1925 was away to Watford. Berry gave Gillingham an early lead but Watford equalised shortly after half-time. Brown scored a second goal for Gillingham and Fox made a late save to preserve his team's 2–1 lead. The victory took Gillingham up to 14th place in the table, but they fell back to 15th after a 3–0 defeat to Bournemouth & Boscombe Athletic. Although prior to the game Bournemouth had not won at home for nearly three months, the Athletic News reported that "the margin of three clear goals in no way flatter[ed] them". Gillingham secured their third victory in four league games with a 2–0 defeat of Brighton & Hove Albion on 24 January. Chance, who had scored only once in more than 20 games since joining Gillingham, scored both goals; Hall had three shots which hit the goalposts. Gillingham's final game of January ended in a 2–0 defeat to 4th-placed Plymouth Argyle. In the first two games of February, Gillingham drew with both of the division's teams from the city of Bristol. Chance scored again to secure a 1–1 draw at home to Bristol City on 7 February after Fox had conceded a goal when a cross-field kick by a City player was caught by a strong wind and swerved past him; four days later Gillingham drew 0–0 with Bristol Rovers in a game affected by high winds. Gillingham lost 2–0 to Swindon Town on 14 February in a game in which both teams played well despite very muddy conditions.

Following a 2–0 victory over Aberdare Athletic at Priestfield Road on 21 February, in which Brown scored what would prove to be his final goal of the season, Gillingham began a run of seven games in which they scored only one goal. In the final match of February, they lost 1–0 at home to Northampton Town, after Fox slipped over and allowed a soft shot on goal to get past him. The Athletic News noted that in the closing stages "the Northampton defence was often in difficulty, but the ball could not be forced into the net". Gillingham lost 2–0 away to Charlton Athletic on 7 March, but then beat Queens Park Rangers 1–0 at Priestfield Road a week later. Harold Crockford, a forward who had made his debut against Charlton after joining Gillingham from Chesterfield, scored the winner against Queens Park Rangers, but it would prove to be his only Football League goal for Gillingham. The team's next three games all ended in goalless draws. On 18 March, Gillingham secured a 0–0 draw against Swansea Town, who were in 2nd place in the league table going into the game. The result was the same away to Merthyr Town and at home to Reading; the Athletic News reported that in the latter match Arthur Sykes, deputising for Fox in goal, only handled the ball three times in the entire game. At the end of March, Gillingham were in 12th place in the table.

In their first match of April, Gillingham lost 2–0 to Swansea Town, who were chasing the divisional championship and were dominant even with four reserve players in the team due to injuries. Gillingham ended their four-match goalless run with a 3–1 victory over Norwich City on 10 April; Joe Craddock debuted in the forward line after impressing with his performances for the club's reserve team. After Norwich led at half-time, Marshall scored twice for Gillingham and Berry added a third. After the victory, Gillingham drew three consecutive games for the second time in 1925. The run began one day after the match against Norwich, as Marshall scored a late equaliser after Gillingham had fallen behind to Exeter City; the next two games resulted in goalless draws with Norwich City and Bristol Rovers. The Athletic News reported that the quality of play in the latter game was so poor that many spectators left before the end. In the penultimate game of the season, Craddock scored his first Football League goal to give Gillingham a 1–0 victory at home to Newport County. Gillingham's five-match unbeaten run came to an end with a 2–0 defeat away to Millwall in the final game of the season; both goals were scored in the final ten minutes of the game. Gillingham finished the season in 13th place in the league table, meaning that they had improved their final position for a fourth consecutive season.

=== League match details ===
Key

- In the result column, Gillingham's score is shown first
- H = Home match
- A = Away match
- pen. = Penalty kick

Results^{[b]}

Date	Opponents	Result	Goalscorers	Attendance
30 August 1924	Luton Town (A)	0–0		8,000
3 September 1924	Brentford (H)	1–0	Hall	5,500
6 September 1924	Watford (H)	0–0		6,000
8 September 1924	Brentford (A)	1–2	Hall	6,000
13 September 1924	Bournemouth & Boscombe Athletic (H)	0–0		5,500
20 September 1924	Brighton & Hove Albion (A)	0–2		11,000
27 September 1924	Plymouth Argyle (H)	0–3		8,000
4 October 1924	Bristol City (A)	1–2	Marshall	9,000
11 October 1924	Swindon Town (H)	1–1	Hall	7,000
18 October 1924	Aberdare Athletic (A)	1–2	Brown	3,000
22 October 1924	Millwall (H)	1–0	Hall	3,000
25 October 1924	Northampton Town (A)	0–1		7,000
1 November 1924	Charlton Athletic (H)	2–0	Brown (2)	2,000
8 November 1924	Queens Park Rangers (A)	1–1	Hall	9,000
15 November 1924	Merthyr Town (H)	2–1	Brown, Marshall	6,000
22 November 1924	Reading (A)	1–0	Hall	6,000
6 December 1924	Exeter City (A)	3–3	Brown, Berry, Hall	6,000
20 December 1924	Newport County (A)	0–2		8,000
25 December 1924	Southend United (H)	3–1	Hook, Marshall (2)	8,000
26 December 1924	Southend United (A)	0–4		9,000
27 December 1924	Luton Town (H)	4–1	Marshall, Ramsell (2), Chance	1,000
3 January 1925	Watford (A)	2–1	Berry, Brown	5,000
17 January 1925	Bournemouth & Boscombe Athletic (A)	0–3		6,000
24 January 1925	Brighton & Hove Albion (H)	2–0	Chance (2)	6,000
31 January 1925	Plymouth Argyle (A)	0–2		10,401
7 February 1925	Bristol City (H)	1–1	Chance	5,000
11 February 1925	Bristol Rovers (H)	0–0		4,000
14 February 1925	Swindon Town (A)	0–2		5,000
21 February 1925	Aberdare Athletic (H)	2–0	Marshall (pen.), Brown	5,000
28 February 1925	Northampton Town (H)	0–1		6,000
7 March 1925	Charlton Athletic (A)	0–2		7,000
14 March 1925	Queens Park Rangers (H)	1–0	Crockford	5,000
18 March 1925	Swansea Town (H)	0–0		3,800
21 March 1925	Merthyr Town (A)	0–0		4,000
28 March 1925	Reading (H)	0–0		5,000
4 April 1925	Swansea Town (A)	0–2		11,300
10 April 1925	Norwich City (H)	3–1	Marshall (2), Berry	6,000
11 April 1925	Exeter City (H)	1–1	Marshall	6,500
13 April 1925	Norwich City (A)	0–0		12,000
18 April 1925	Bristol Rovers (A)	0–0		6,000
25 April 1925	Newport County (H)	1–0	Craddock	5,000
2 May 1925	Millwall (A)	0–2		10,000

=== Partial league table ===
Football League Third Division South final table, positions 11 to 15
Pos	Team	Pld	W	D	L	GF	GA	GAv	Pts
11	Watford	42	17	9	16	38	47	0.809	43
12	Norwich City	42	14	13	15	53	51	1.039	41
13	Gillingham	42	13	14	15	35	44	0.795	40
14	Reading	42	14	10	18	37	38	0.974	38
15	Charlton Athletic	42	13	12	17	46	48	0.958	38

== FA Cup ==
The Daily News published a cartoon lamenting the bad weather conditions during the third replay between Gillingham and Barrow.

Gillingham entered the 1924–25 FA Cup in the fifth qualifying round and were drawn to play Kettering Town of the Southern League. The match took place at Rockingham Road, Kettering's home ground, and ended in a 1–1 draw, meaning that a replay at Priestfield Road was required. In the second match, Gillingham scored four goals in the first half and went on to win 6–2, despite having to play with only ten men for much of the second half after Davis was injured.^{[a]}

In the sixth and final qualifying round, Gillingham played Barrow of the Football League Third Division North at Priestfield Road. A game in which both teams' defences were dominant ended in a 0–0 draw. Barrow took the lead in the replay at their home ground, Holker Street, but Norman Jones scored an equaliser for Gillingham; unlike in the first match, scores being level at the end of the regulation 90 minutes meant that 30 minutes of extra time were played, but no further goals were scored. The second replay took place at a neutral venue, Molineux Stadium, the home ground of Wolverhampton Wanderers. Syd Smith gave Gillingham the lead but Barrow equalised; extra time was again played but once again the match finished with scores level.

The third replay took place at Arsenal Stadium in London on 30 December and was played in heavy rain; the Birmingham Gazette reported that the pitch was "scarcely fit for play" and that "mud and slush reduced everything down to a game of chance". Barrow took the lead from a penalty kick but Hall equalised for Gillingham and the game ended in another draw, setting up a fourth replay. The two teams thus equalled the record for the greatest number of replays required to settle an FA Cup tie; Gillingham themselves (then known as New Brompton) had been involved in the record-setting tie 25 seasons earlier when they had needed four replays to defeat Woolwich Arsenal. One day after the third replay, Gillingham and Barrow met again at The Den, the home ground of Millwall. Barrow scored twice in the first half and, although Marshall pulled a goal back from a penalty kick in the second half, Gillingham lost 2–1 and were eliminated from the competition; the teams had played for a total of nine hours before Barrow achieved victory.

=== Cup match details ===
Key

- In result column, Gillingham's score shown first
- H = Home match
- A = Away match
- N = Match played at a neutral venue
- pen. = Penalty kick

Results

Date	Round	Opponents	Result	Goalscorers	Attendance
29 November 1924	Fifth qualifying	Kettering Town (A)	1–1	Brown	8,986
3 December 1924	Fifth qualifying (replay)	Kettering Town (H)	6–2	Brown (2), Hall (2), Marshall, Berry	8,202
13 December 1924	Sixth qualifying	Barrow (H)	0–0		9,000
18 December 1924	Sixth qualifying (replay)	Barrow (A)	1–1 (a.e.t.)	Jones	3,600
22 December 1924	Sixth qualifying (second replay)	Barrow (N)	1–1 (a.e.t.)	Smith	2,342
30 December 1924	Sixth qualifying (third replay)	Barrow (N)	1–1 (a.e.t.)	Hall	2,325
31 December 1924	Sixth qualifying (fourth replay)	Barrow (N)	1–2	Marshall (pen.)	4,242

== Players ==
Jock Robertson missed only four games.

During the season, 24 players made at least one appearance for Gillingham. Marshall made the most, missing only one game. Chance, Brown, Jones and Jock Robertson all played in at least 45 of the team's 49 games, and three other players made more than 40 appearances. At the other end of the scale, Charles Orford was the only player to make just one appearance; it was the only game he played for Gillingham's first team and the only appearance he made in the Football League for any club during his career. Marshall was top goalscorer with 11; Hall and Brown both also reached double figures, scoring 10 times. No other player scored more than five goals.

Player statistics^{[b]}
Player	Position	Third Division South		FA Cup		Total	
Player	Position	Apps	Goals	Apps	Goals	Apps	Goals
Bill Berry	FW	37	3	6	1	43	4
Fred Brown	FW	39	7	7	3	46	10
Charlie Butler	FB	21	0	4	0	25	0
George Chance	FW	40	4	7	0	47	4
George Cook	HB	7	0	1	0	8	0
Joe Craddock	FW	3	1	0	0	3	1
Harold Crockford	FW	7	1	0	0	7	1
Charles Davis	HB	5	0	2	0	7	0
Dick Edmed	FW	3	0	1	0	4	0
Freddie Fox	GK	36	0	7	0	43	0
Tommy Hall	FW	37	7	7	3	44	10
Dick Hendrie	FB	25	0	3	0	28	0
Albert Hook	HB	20	1	7	0	27	1
Norman Jones	HB	39	0	7	1	46	1
Jimmy Keegan	FW	4	0	0	0	4	0
Frank Marshall	FW	41	9	7	2	48	11
Charles Orford	HB	1	0	0	0	1	0
Len Ramsell	FW	10	2	1	0	11	2
Jock Robertson	FB	38	0	7	0	45	0
Jack Rutherford	HB	29	0	0	0	29	0
Syd Smith	FW	4	0	3	1	7	1
Arthur Sykes	GK	6	0	0	0	6	0
Alf Vango	HB	5	0	0	0	5	0
Thomas Wilkinson	FW	5	0	0	0	5	0

FW = Forward, HB = Half-back, GK = Goalkeeper, FB = Full-back

== Aftermath ==
Less than three weeks after the final match of the domestic season, Fox played for England in an international match against France; the club has at times listed him as the first player to gain an international cap while on Gillingham's books, but although he was still with Gillingham when the team selection was announced on 24 April, he was transferred to Millwall before the match actually took place.

Gillingham improved their final position again in the 1925–26 season, ending the campaign in 10th place, the first time the team had finished in the top half of the league table since entering the Football League. Curtis left the club at the end of that campaign to become manager of Brentford; after his departure, it would be seven seasons before Gillingham finished in the top half again.

== Footnotes ==
a. The concept of substitutes was not introduced to English football until the 1960s; previously, an injured player had to play on or else the team had to continue with a reduced number of players.
b. Brown records that Marshall scored once and Berry twice against Norwich City on 10 April, but contemporary newspaper reports indicate that it was the opposite way round.
