= 1922–23 Birmingham F.C. season =

Birmingham F.C.
1922–23 season
- Chairman: Howard Cant
- Secretary-manager: Frank Richards
- Ground: St Andrew's
- Football League First Division: 17th
- FA Cup: First round (eliminated by Huddersfield Town)
- Top goalscorer: League: Joe Bradford (18); All: Joe Bradford (19)
- Highest home attendance: 50,000 vs Aston Villa, 17 March 1923
- Lowest home attendance: 8,542 vs Oldham Athletic, 10 February 1923
- Average home league attendance: 27,233
Home colours

The 1922–23 Football League season was Birmingham Football Club's 27th in the Football League and their 10th in the First Division. They finished in 17th position in the 22-team division, and set an unwanted record sequence of eight league defeats, since equalled but as of 2012 not beaten. They also competed in the 1922–23 FA Cup, entering at the first round proper and losing to Huddersfield Town in that round.

Twenty-six players made at least one appearance in nationally organised first-team competition, and there were ten different goalscorers. Full-back Jack Jones played in 41 matches over the 43-match season; goalkeeper Dan Tremelling and forward Joe Bradford appeared in one fewer. Bradford was leading scorer for the second year running, with 19 goals, of which 18 came in the league.

Off the field, the club made a £13,000 saving on wages and general expenses to end the season with a profit of £3,000. This was Frank Richards' last season as secretary-manager. He was succeeded by Billy Beer, who as a player made 250 appearances for the club in the 1900s.

== Football League First Division ==
Date	League position	Opponents	Venue	Result	Score F–A	Scorers	Attendance
26 August 1922	9th	Chelsea	A	D	1–1	Bradford	40,000
28 August 1922	17th	Newcastle United	H	L	0–2		35,000
2 September 1922	22nd	Chelsea	H	L	0–1		35,000
6 September 1922	21st	Newcastle United	A	D	0–0		35,000
9 September 1922	15th	Manchester City	A	W	1–0	Bradford	25,000
13 September 1922	8th	Stoke	H	W	2–0	Bradford 2	20,000
16 September 1922	13th	Manchester City	H	L	0–1		30,000
23 September 1922	19th	Bolton Wanderers	A	L	0–3		17,680
30 September 1922	14th	Bolton Wanderers	H	W	2–0	Bradford 2	25,000
7 October 1922	13th	Blackburn Rovers	A	D	1–1	Bradford	25,000
14 October 1922	15th	Blackburn Rovers	H	D	1–1	Whitehouse	30,000
21 October 1922	17th	Middlesbrough	A	L	1–2	Whitehouse	15,000
28 October 1922	13th	Middlesbrough	H	W	2–0	Bradford, Foxall	25,000
4 November 1922	14th	Cardiff City	H	D	0–0		30,000
11 November 1922	13th	Cardiff City	A	D	1–1	Watkins	25,000
18 November 1922	9th	Nottingham Forest	H	W	2–0	Bradford, Linley	30,000
25 November 1922	9th	Nottingham Forest	A	D	1–1	Bradford	15,000
2 December 1922	7th	Arsenal	H	W	3–2	Foxall, Linley	29,772
9 December 1922	10th	Arsenal	A	L	0–1		30,000
16 December 1922	9th	Everton	H	D	1–1	Foxall	20,000
23 December 1922	11th	Everton	A	L	1–2	Bradford	20,000
25 December 1922	11th	Huddersfield Town	H	D	0–0		20,000
26 December 1922	12th	Huddersfield Town	A	L	0–4		20,000
30 December 1922	14th	Sunderland	A	L	3–5	Bradford, Whitehouse 2	12,000
6 January 1923	16th	Sunderland	H	L	1–2	Barratt	30,000
20 January 1923	18th	West Bromwich Albion	H	L	0–2		32,180
27 January 1923	19th	West Bromwich Albion	A	L	0–1		25,123
3 February 1923	20th	Oldham Athletic	A	L	0–2		9,000
10 February 1923	21st	Oldham Athletic	H	L	2–3	Bradford 2	8,542
17 February 1923	21st	Sheffield United	A	L	1–7	Rawson	12,000
3 March 1923	21st	Preston North End	A	W	3–2	Rawson, Bradford, Crosbie	12,000
10 March 1923	19th	Preston North End	H	W	1–0	Rawson	30,000
12 March 1923	19th	Sheffield United	H	W	4–2	Rawson 2, Daws, Bradford	12,000
17 March 1923	17th	Aston Villa	H	W	1–0	Rawson	50,000
24 March 1923	18th	Aston Villa	A	L	0–3		40,000
31 March 1923	19th	Liverpool	H	L	0–1		35,000
2 April 1923	19th	Stoke	A	D	0–0		22,000
7 April 1923	18th	Liverpool	A	D	0–0		28,000
14 April 1923	18th	Tottenham Hotspur	H	W	2–1	Rawson, McClure	25,000
21 April 1923	20th	Tottenham Hotspur	A	L	0–2		16,355
28 April 1923	19th	Burnley	H	W	1–0	Bradford	19,405
5 May 1923	17th	Burnley	A	W	2–0	Bradford, Rawson	10,000

=== League table (part) ===
Final First Division table (part)
Pos	Club	Pld	W	D	L	F	A	GA	Pts
15th	Burnley	42	16	6	20	58	59	0.98	38
16th	Preston North End	42	13	11	18	60	64	0.94	37
17th	Birmingham	42	13	11	18	41	57	0.72	37
18th	Middlesbrough	42	13	10	19	57	63	0.91	36
19th	Chelsea	42	9	18	15	45	53	0.85	36
Key	Pos = League position; Pld = Matches played; W = Matches won; D = Matches drawn; L = Matches lost; F = Goals for; A = Goals against; GA = Goal average; Pts = Points								
Source									

== FA Cup ==
Round	Date	Opponents	Venue	Result	Score F–A	Scorers	Attendance
First round	13 January 1923	Huddersfield Town	A	L	1–2	Joe Bradford	27,300

== Appearances and goals ==
This table includes appearances and goals in nationally organised competitive matches – the Football League and FA Cup – only.
For a description of the playing positions, see Formation (association football)#2–3–5 (Pyramid).
Players marked † left the club during the playing season.

Players' appearances and goals by competition
Name	Position	League		FA Cup		Total	
Name	Position	Apps	Goals	Apps	Goals	Apps	Goals
Arthur Samson	Goalkeeper	2	0	0	0	2	0
Dan Tremelling	Goalkeeper	40	0	1	0	40	0
Eli Ashurst	Full back	16	0	1	0	16	0
Jack Jones	Full back	41	0	1	0	41	0
Frank Womack	Full back	27	0	0	0	27	0
Percy Barton	Half back	31	0	1	0	32	0
Dickie Dale	Half back	22	0	1	0	23	0
Jimmy Daws	Half back	15	1	0	0	15	1
Bill Hunter	Half back	1	0	0	0	1	0
George Liddell	Half back	19	0	0	0	19	0
Alec McClure	Half back	38	1	1	0	39	1
George Waddell	Half back	2	0	0	0	2	0
Joe Barratt	Forward	18	1	1	0	19	1
Charlie Bosbury	Forward	15	0	0	0	15	0
Joe Bradford	Forward	39	18	1	1	40	19
Wally Clark	Forward	7	0	0	0	7	0
Johnny Crosbie	Forward	32	1	1	0	33	1
Fred Foxall	Forward	17	3	0	0	17	3
Bill Harvey	Forward	9	0	0	0	9	0
Moses Lane	Forward	2	0	0	0	2	0
Ted Linley	Forward	26	3	1	0	27	3
Albert Rawson	Forward	13	8	0	0	13	8
Frank Sharp †	Forward	5	0	0	0	5	0
Leonard Thompson	Forward	1	0	0	0	1	0
Ernie Watkins	Forward	8	1	0	0	8	1
Jackie Whitehouse	Forward	16	4	1	0	17	4

== See also ==
- Birmingham City F.C. seasons
