= 1927–28 Brentford F.C. season =

English football team season

Brentford
1927–28 season
- Chairman: Louis P. Simon
- Manager: Harry Curtis
- Stadium: Griffin Park
- Third Division South: 12th
- FA Cup: Third round
- Top goalscorer: League: Phillips (18); All: Phillips (18)
- Highest home attendance: 12,513
- Lowest home attendance: 2,024
- Average home league attendance: 7,331
Home colours

During the 1927–28 English football season, Brentford competed in the Football League Third Division South. A season of transition saw the Bees finish in mid-table and score 76 goals, which was at that time the club's best goalscoring tally since joining the Football League in 1920.

== Season summary ==
Brentford's 1927–28 team photograph.

Despite a sizeable amount of money in the bank after the previous season's cup exploits and big money sales of Jack Allen, Archie Clark and George Anderson, Brentford manager Harry Curtis elected to add to, rather than rebuild, his squad for the 1927–28 season. He invested in Scottish youngsters John Cairns, Jimmy Drinnan, William Hodge, Alexander Stevenson, Samuel Ward and English teenager Joe Wiggins.

Three defeats in the opening 10 matches of the season put the Bees as high as second place, with off-season signing Jack Phillips scoring 9 goals, Herbert Lawson five and Ernie Watkins four. By mid-October 1927, the goals had dried up and the club dropped to mid-table. During this period, Brentford suffered a club record 7–1 FA Cup defeat to Manchester United. A 3–2 victory over Walsall at Griffin Park on 5 December (one of just two wins in the midst of the bad run) was witnessed by 2,024, the club record lowest for a home Football League match. The Bees' form picked up again late January 1928 and the team secured a 12th-place finish. Jack Phillips finished the season as he began it, with 9 goals in 10 matches, to finish as top-scorer with 18 goals. Brentford's 76 goals was the highest since joining the Football League in 1920 and the club finished the season £171 in profit (equivalent to £9,300 in 2025).

== League table ==
Pos	Team	Pld	W	D	L	GF	GA	GAv	Pts
10	Queens Park Rangers	42	17	9	16	72	71	1.014	43
11	Charlton Athletic	42	15	13	14	60	70	0.857	43
12	Brentford	42	16	8	18	76	74	1.027	40
13	Luton Town	42	16	7	19	94	87	1.080	39
14	Bournemouth & Boscombe Athletic	42	13	12	17	72	79	0.911	38

== Results ==
Brentford's goal tally listed first.

=== Legend ===
Win	Draw	Loss

=== Football League Third Division South ===
No.	Date	Opponent	Venue	Result	Attendance	Scorer(s)
1	27 August 1927	Brighton & Hove Albion	A	2–5	13,164	Phillips, Drinnan
2	29 August 1927	Northampton Town	H	3–0	8,280	Phillips (3)
3	3 September 1927	Bournemouth & Boscombe Athletic	H	2–1	11,108	Fletcher, Douglas
4	5 September 1927	Northampton Town	A	2–3	7,220	Lane, Watkins
5	10 September 1927	Queens Park Rangers	A	3–2	18,826	Watkins, Phillips, Lane
6	14 September 1927	Bristol Rovers	A	3–1	2,578	Phillips, Lawson, Watkins
7	17 September 1927	Luton Town	A	2–5	9,182	Lawson (2)
8	24 September 1927	Millwall	H	6–1	12,513	Douglas, Watkins (pen), Lawson (2), Phillips
9	1 October 1927	Crystal Palace	A	2–0	11,552	Phillips, Lane
10	8 October 1927	Exeter City	H	1–1	11,326	Lawson
11	15 October 1927	Torquay United	A	1–2	4,185	Lawson
12	22 October 1927	Coventry City	H	4–1	4,666	Craddock (2), Hodge, Lane
13	29 October 1927	Newport County	A	0–3	5,790	
14	5 November 1927	Swindon Town	H	1–4	9,527	Lane
15	12 November 1927	Gillingham	A	1–2	3,293	Lawson
16	3 December 1927	Plymouth Argyle	H	0–2	7,537	
17	5 December 1927	Walsall	H	3–2	2,024	Watkins, Dearn (pen), Lane
18	10 December 1927	Merthyr Town	A	1–3	2,465	Craddock
19	17 December 1927	Charlton Athletic	H	1–1	5,245	Berry
20	24 December 1927	Watford	A	1–1	5,226	Craddock
21	26 December 1927	Southend United	A	2–3	3,540	Craddock (2)
22	31 December 1927	Brighton & Hove Albion	H	1–3	6,061	Lane
23	7 January 1928	Bournemouth & Boscombe Athletic	A	0–1	4,796	
24	21 January 1928	Queens Park Rangers	H	0–3	10,430	
25	28 January 1928	Luton Town	H	4–2	3,291	Watkins (4)
26	4 February 1928	Millwall	A	0–3	16,885	
27	11 February 1928	Crystal Palace	H	2–1	7,580	Beacham, Drinnan
28	18 February 1928	Exeter City	A	1–0	7,420	Drinnan
29	25 February 1928	Torquay United	H	1–2	8,355	Lane
30	3 March 1928	Coventry City	A	0–0	8,188	
31	10 March 1928	Newport County	H	3–1	5,759	Berry (2), Phillips
32	17 March 1928	Swindon Town	A	1–1	6,500	Phillips
33	24 March 1928	Gillingham	H	2–0	6,107	Lane (2)
34	31 March 1928	Walsall	A	2–4	4,750	Phillips, Drinnan
35	6 April 1928	Norwich City	H	3–1	11,814	Berry, Price, Wiggins
36	7 April 1928	Bristol Rovers	H	5–1	7,894	Wiggins, Cairns, Drinnan (2), Lawson
37	9 April 1928	Norwich City	A	1–1	10,848	Berry (pen)
38	14 April 1928	Plymouth Argyle	A	0–1	5,940	
39	21 April 1928	Merthyr Town	H	4–0	4,583	Phillips (2), Berry, Lane
40	23 April 1928	Southend United	H	2–2	4,889	Phillips (2)
41	28 April 1928	Charlton Athletic	A	2–3	7,122	Watkins, Phillips
42	5 May 1928	Watford	H	1–1	4,775	Phillips

=== FA Cup ===
Round	Date	Opponent	Venue	Result	Attendance	Scorer(s)
3R	14 January 1928	Manchester United	A	1–7	18,538	Jones (og)

- Sources: Statto, 11v11, 100 Years of Brentford

== Playing squad ==
Players' ages are as of the opening day of the 1927–28 season.

Pos.	Name	Nat.	Date of birth (age)	Signed from	Signed in	Notes
Goalkeepers
GK	Henry Bailey	(England)	2 December 1897 (aged 29)	Exeter City	1927	
Defenders
DF	Charlie Butler	(England)	10 October 1897 (aged 29)	Gillingham	1926	
DF	James Donnelly	(Republic of Ireland)	18 December 1893 (aged 33)	Southend United	1925	
DF	Dick Hendrie	(Scotland)	22 November 1895 (aged 31)	Grays Thurrock United	1927	Assistant trainer
DF	Alexander Stevenson	(Scotland)	24 October 1903 (aged 23)	Armadale	1927	
DF	Ted Winship	(England)	1900 (aged 26–27)	Kidderminster Harriers	1926	
Midfielders
HB	Jack Beacham	(England)	15 August 1902 (aged 25)	Weymouth	1925	
HB	Stephen Dearn (c)	(England)	March 1901 (aged 26)	Portsmouth	1926	
HB	Albert Fletcher	(England)	1898 (aged 28–29)	West Ham United	1927	
HB	William Hodge	(Scotland)	31 August 1904 (aged 22)	Rangers	1927	
HB	Samuel Ward	(Scotland)	1 June 1906 (aged 21)	Morton	1927	
Forwards
FW	Bill Berry	(England)	18 August 1904 (aged 23)	Gillingham	1926	
FW	John Cairns	(Scotland)	14 November 1902 (aged 24)	Charlton Athletic	1927	
FW	Alfred Douglas	(England)	26 March 1899 (aged 28)	Washington Colliery	1925	
FW	Jimmy Drinnan	(Scotland)	28 May 1906 (aged 21)	Newport County	1927	
FW	Jack Lane	(England)	29 May 1898 (aged 29)	Chesterfield	1925	
FW	Herbert Lawson	(England)	12 April 1905 (aged 22)	Arsenal	1927	
FW	Jim McCafferty	(Scotland)	November 1900 (aged 26)	Halifax Town	1927	
FW	Jack Phillips	(Wales)	28 May 1903 (aged 24)	Merthyr Town	1927	
FW	William Price	(England)	4 December 1903 (aged 23)	Woking Town	1928	Amateur
FW	Ernie Watkins	(England)	3 April 1898 (aged 29)	Southend United	1926	
FW	Joe Wiggins	(England)	1 April 1909 (aged 18)	Grays Thurrock United	1927	
Players who left the club mid-season
GK	Jim Ferguson	(Scotland)	30 August 1896 (aged 30)	St Roch's	1926	Transferred to Notts County
FW	Joe Craddock	(England)	3 August 1902 (aged 25)	Gillingham	1926	Transferred to Dundee

- Sources: Timeless Bees, Football League Players' Records 1888 to 1939, 100 Years Of Brentford

== Coaching staff ==
Name	Role
(England) Harry Curtis	Manager
(Scotland) Dick Hendrie	Assistant manager
(England) Jack Cartmell	Trainer

== Statistics ==
=== Appearances and goals ===

Brentford's highest appearance-makers in each position during the Football League season.

Pos	Nat	Name	League		FA Cup		Total	
Pos	Nat	Name	Apps	Goals	Apps	Goals	Apps	Goals
GK	(England)	Henry Bailey	15	0	0	0	15	0
GK	(Scotland)	Jim Ferguson	27	0	1	0	28	0
DF	(England)	Charlie Butler	40	0	0	0	40	0
DF	(Republic of Ireland)	James Donnelly	1	0	0	0	1	0
DF	(Scotland)	Dick Hendrie	0	0	1	0	1	0
DF	(Scotland)	Alexander Stevenson	2	0	0	0	2	0
DF	(England)	Ted Winship	41	0	1	0	42	0
HB	(England)	Jack Beacham	29	1	1	0	30	1
HB	(England)	Stephen Dearn	40	1	1	0	41	1
HB	(England)	Albert Fletcher	33	1	0	0	33	1
HB	(Scotland)	William Hodge	19	1	1	0	20	1
HB	(Scotland)	Samuel Ward	7	0	0	0	7	0
FW	(England)	Bill Berry	25	6	1	0	26	6
FW	(Scotland)	John Cairns	1	1	0	0	1	1
FW	(England)	Joe Craddock	11	6	1	0	12	6
FW	(England)	Alfred Douglas	24	2	1	0	25	2
FW	(Scotland)	Jimmy Drinnan	18	6	0	0	18	6
FW	(England)	Jack Lane	37	11	1	0	38	11
FW	(England)	Herbert Lawson	34	9	0	0	34	9
FW	(Scotland)	Jim McCafferty	1	0	0	0	1	0
FW	(Wales)	Jack Phillips	23	18	0	0	23	18
FW	(England)	William Price	1	1	0	0	1	1
FW	(England)	Ernie Watkins	29	10	1	0	30	10
FW	(England)	Joe Wiggins	4	2	0	0	4	2

- Players listed in italics left the club mid-season.
- Source: 100 Years of Brentford

=== Goalscorers ===
Pos.	Nat	Player	FL3	FAC	Total
FW	(Wales)	Jack Phillips	18	0	18
FW	(England)	Jack Lane	11	0	11
FW	(England)	Ernie Watkins	10	0	10
FW	(England)	Herbert Lawson	9	0	9
FW	(England)	Bill Berry	6	0	6
FW	(England)	Joe Craddock	6	0	6
FW	(Scotland)	Jimmy Drinnan	6	0	6
FW	(England)	Alfred Douglas	2	0	2
FW	(England)	Joe Wiggins	2	0	2
HB	(England)	Jack Beacham	1	0	1
FW	(Scotland)	John Cairns	1	0	1
HB	(England)	Stephen Dearn	1	0	1
HB	(England)	Albert Fletcher	1	0	1
HB	(Scotland)	William Hodge	1	0	1
FW	(England)	William Price	1	0	1
Opponent			0	1	1
Total			76	1	77

- Players listed in italics left the club mid-season.
- Source: 100 Years of Brentford

=== Management ===
Name	Nat	From	To	Record All Comps					Record League				
Name	Nat	From	To	P	W	D	L	W %	P	W	D	L	W %
Harry Curtis	(England)	27 August 1927	5 May 1928	43	16	8	19	37.21|	42	16	8	18	38.10

=== Summary ===
Games played	43 (42 Third Division South, 1 FA Cup)
Games won	16 (16 Third Division South, 0 FA Cup)
Games drawn	8 (8 Third Division South, 0 FA Cup)
Games lost	19 (18 Third Division South, 1 FA Cup)
Goals scored	77 (76 Third Division South, 1 FA Cup)
Goals conceded	81 (74 Third Division South, 7 FA Cup)
Clean sheets	6 (6 Third Division South, 0 FA Cup)
Biggest league win	6–1 versus Millwall, 24 September 1927
Worst league defeat	3–0 on two occasions; 4–1 versus Swindon Town, 5 November 1927; 5–2 on two occasions
Most appearances	42, Ted Winship (41 Third Division South, 1 FA Cup)
Top scorer (league)	18, Jack Phillips
Top scorer (all competitions)	18, Jack Phillips

== Transfers & loans ==
Cricketers are not included in this list.

Players transferred in
Date	Pos.	Name	Previous club	Fee	Ref.
July 1927	FW	(Wales) Jack Phillips	(Wales) Merthyr Town	Free	
August 1927	HB	(Scotland) William Hodge	(Scotland) Rangers	Free	
1 September 1927	HB	(Scotland) Stewart Low	(Scotland) Montrose	Free	
1927	GK	(England) Henry Bailey	(England) Exeter City	Free	
1927	FW	(Scotland) John Cairns	(England) Charlton Athletic	Free	
1927	DF	(England) Bill Dempsey	(England) London Prison OS	Free	
1927	FW	(Scotland) Jimmy Drinnan	(Wales) Newport County	Exchange	
1927	HB	(England) Albert Fletcher	(England) West Ham United	Free	
1927	FW	(Scotland) Dick Hendrie	(England) Grays Thurrock United	Free	
1927	FW	(Scotland) Jim McCafferty	(England) Halifax Town	Free	
1927	DF	(Scotland) Alexander Stevenson	(Scotland) Armadale	Free	
1927	HB	(Scotland) Samuel Ward	(Scotland) Morton	Free	
1927	FW	(England) Joe Wiggins	(England) Grays Thurrock United	n/a	
March 1928	FW	(Scotland) Thomas Brennan	(Scotland) Longriggend Rob Roy	n/a	
March 1928	FW	(Scotland) Andy Durnion	(Scotland) St Joseph's	n/a	
March 1928	GK	(England) Freddie Fox	(England) Halifax Town	n/a	
March 1928	FW	(England) Len Ramsell	(England) Chatham Town	n/a	
March 1928	HB	(England) Teddy Ware	(England) Chatham Town	Amateur	
1928	FW	(England) William Price	(England) Woking Town	Amateur	
Players transferred out
Date	Pos.	Name	Subsequent club	Fee	Ref.
May 1927	FW	(Scotland) George Anderson	(England) Chelsea	n/a	
May 1927	HB	(England) Archie Clark	(England) Arsenal	£700	
24 November 1927	HB	(Scotland) Harry Rae	(Scotland) Hamilton Academical	n/a	
January 1928	HB	(Wales) Evan Evans	(England) Chatham Town	n/a	
11 February 1928	FW	(England) Joe Craddock	(Scotland) Dundee	n/a	
March 1928	GK	(Scotland) Jim Ferguson	(England) Notts County	n/a	
Players released
Date	Pos.	Name	Subsequent club	Join date	Ref.
May 1928	DF	(England) Charlie Butler	(Canada) Montreal Carsteel	1928	
May 1928	FW	(Scotland) John Cairns	(England) Leicester City	1928	
May 1928	DF	(England) Bill Dempsey	(England) Queens Park Rangers	1928	
May 1928	DF	(Republic of Ireland) James Donnelly	(England) Thames	1928	
May 1928	HB	(England) Albert Fletcher	(England) Norwich City	1928	
May 1928	HB	(Scotland) Stewart Low	n/a		
May 1928	FW	(England) William Price	(England) Fulham	June 1928	
May 1928	HB	(Scotland) Samuel Ward	Retired		
