= Bill Berry (footballer, born 1904) =

English footballer and manager (1904–1972)

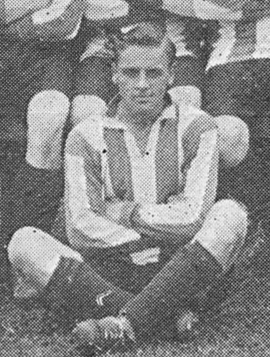
- Berry while with Brentford in 1926

Personal information
- Full name: William George Berry
- Date of birth: 18 August 1904
- Place of birth: Hackney, England
- Date of death: 15 September 1972 (aged 68)
- Place of death: Manor Park, England
- Position: Outside left

Youth career
- Royal Naval Depot

Senior career*
Years	Team	Apps	(Gls)
1923–1924	Charlton Athletic	11	(2)
1924–1926	Gillingham	79	(9)
1926–1932	Brentford	134	(40)
1932–1933	Crystal Palace	17	(4)
1933–1934	Bournemouth & Boscombe Athletic	12	(2)
1934–1937	SC Fives		

Managerial career
- 1934–1944: SC Fives
- 1944–1946: Lille
- 1946–1948: Lierse
- 1949–1950: Kjøbenhavns Boldklub
- 1953–1955: Nice
- 1955–1956: Club de Hammam-Lif
- 1956–1958: Étoile du Sahel
- 1958–1961: Jeunesse Esch
- 1961–1965: Union Luxembourg
- * Club domestic league appearances and goals

William George Berry (18 August 1904 – 15 September 1972), known in England as Bill Berry and in Francophone nations as George Berry or Georges Berry, was an English professional footballer who made over 130 appearances as an outside left in the Football League for Brentford. He also played league football for Gillingham, Charlton Athletic, Crystal Palace and Bournemouth & Boscombe Athletic and after his retirement he had a 30-year management career with clubs in France, Belgium, Tunisia and Luxembourg.

== Playing career ==
=== Early years ===
An outside left, Berry began his career with the Royal Naval Depot team in Chatham, before joining Third Division South club Charlton Athletic in 1923. He made 11 league appearances and scored two goals for the club before moving to Gillingham, of the same division, in February 1924. Berry remained at Priestfield for two-and-a-half seasons and made 87 appearances, scoring 11 goals.

=== Brentford ===
Together with Gillingham teammates Wally Barnard, Charlie Reddock, Charlie Butler and Joe Craddock, Berry followed former Gillingham manager Harry Curtis to Third Division South club Brentford in May 1926. He failed to fully make the outside left berth his own and was dropped to the reserve team for the 1929–30 season. He returned to the first team in good form during the 1930–31 season, scoring 19 goals in 37 appearances. The signing of Arthur Crompton in February 1932 signalled the beginning of the end of Berry's time at Griffin Park and after making just one appearance during the early months of the 1932–33 season, he left the club in November 1932. He made 148 appearances and scored 44 goals in just over five seasons with the Bees.

=== Later career ===
In November 1932, Berry joined Third Division South club Crystal Palace in a part-exchange deal which saw Idris Hopkins move to Brentford. In what remained of the 1932–33 season, Berry scored four goals in 17 appearances, but in an unlucky twist, he lost his place to new signing Arthur Crompton, whose signing had cost him his place at Brentford a year earlier. He closed out his Football League career with a short spell at Bournemouth & Boscombe Athletic, before moving to France to join National club SC Fives in 1934, where he remained until his retirement as a player in 1937.

== Managerial career ==
Berry had a long and successful management career in France, Belgium, Denmark, Tunisia and Luxembourg. He won the double with Lille OSC in the 1945–46 season and a Coupe de France with OGC Nice in 1953–54. Berry won the Tunisian National Championship twice, in 1955–56 with CS Hammam-Lif and in 1957–58 with Étoile Sportive du Sahel. He twice won the Luxembourg National Division with Jeunesse Esch (1958–59 and 1959–60) and once with Union Luxembourg (1961–62), in addition to one Luxembourg Cup with the latter club.

== Career statistics ==
Appearances and goals by club, season and competition
Club	Season	League			FA Cup		Total	
Club	Season	Division	Apps	Goals	Apps	Goals	Apps	Goals
Gillingham	1923–24	Third Division South	16	1	—		16	1
Gillingham	1924–25	Third Division South	37	3	6	1	43	4
Gillingham	1925–26	Third Division South	26	5	2	1	28	6
Gillingham	Total		79	9	8	2	87	11
Brentford	1926–27	Third Division South	22	5	2	0	24	5
Brentford	1927–28	Third Division South	25	6	1	0	26	6
Brentford	1928–29	Third Division South	23	5	1	0	24	5
Brentford	1930–31	Third Division South	32	18	5	1	37	19
Brentford	1931–32	Third Division South	31	6	5	2	36	8
Brentford	1932–33	Third Division South	1	0	—		1	0
Brentford	Total		134	40	14	3	148	44
Crystal Palace	1932–33	Third Division South	17	4	0	0	17	4
Career total			230	53	22	5	252	59

== Honours ==
Lille

- Division 1: 1945–46
- Coupe de France: 1945–46

Kjøbenhavns Boldklub

- Division 1: 1949–50

Nice

- Coupe de France: 1953–54

CS Hammam-Lif

- Tunisian National Championship: 1955–56

Étoile Sportive du Sahel

- Tunisian National Championship: 1957–58

Jeunesse Esch

- Luxembourg National Division: 1958–59, 1959–60

Union Luxembourg

- Luxembourg National Division: 1961–62
- Luxembourg Cup: 1962–63
