= Arthur Sykes =

Arthur Sykes may refer to:

- Arthur Sykes (footballer, born 1902) (1902–?), English football player
- Arthur Sykes (footballer, born 1897) (1897–1978), English football winger
- Arthur Ashley Sykes (1684–1756), Anglican religious writer
- Art Sykes (1913–1996), American boxer
