= Herbert Lawson =

English footballer (1905–1987)

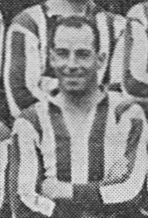
- Lawson while with Brentford in 1927.

Personal information
- Full name: Herbert Lawson
- Date of birth: 12 April 1905
- Place of birth: Luton, England
- Date of death: 1987 (aged 81–82)
- Place of death: Stevenage, England
- Position: Outside right

Youth career
- Frickers Athletic

Senior career*
Years	Team	Apps	(Gls)
–1924	Luton Clarence		
1924–1927	Arsenal	13	(2)
1927–1933	Brentford	62	(12)
1933–1934	Luton Town	1	(0)
1934–1935	Bedford Town	39	(9)
1936	Vauxhall Motors		
1939	Letchworth		
- * Club domestic league appearances and goals

Herbert Lawson (12 April 1905 – 1987) was an English professional footballer who played in the Football League as an outside right, most notably for Brentford and Arsenal.

== Career ==
=== Arsenal ===
After beginning his career as an amateur with hometown Athenian League club Luton Clarence, Lawson joined First Division strugglers Arsenal in 1924. Lawson had to wait until February 1926 to make his professional debut and he enjoyed a run in the team until the end of the 1925–26 season, making 13 appearances and scoring two goals. He failed to make an appearance during the 1926–27 season and departed Highbury in March 1927.

=== Brentford ===
Lawson dropped down to the Third Division South to sign for fellow London club Brentford in May 1927, as a replacement for retired outside forward Patsy Hendren. After making 13 appearances in what remained of the 1926–27 season, Lawson broke into the team the following year and made 34 appearances, scoring 9 goals. He was mostly confined to the reserves for the following three seasons at Griffin Park and helped the team to London Combination titles in 1931–32 and 1932–33. Lawson left Brentford in 1933, having made 64 appearances and scored 12 goals in six years with the club.

=== Later career ===
After a short spell with Third Division South club Luton Town, Lawson finished his career in non-League football with Bedford Town, Vauxhall Motors and Letchworth.

== Personal life ==
Lawson's father Billy was trainer at Luton Town for 30 years.

== Career statistics ==
Appearances and goals by club, season and competition
Club	Season	League			FA Cup		Total	
Club	Season	Division	Apps	Goals	Apps	Goals	Apps	Goals
Arsenal	1925–26	First Division	13	2	3	0	15	2
Brentford	1926–27	Third Division South	13	2	—		13	2
Brentford	1927–28	Third Division South	34	9	0	0	34	9
Brentford	1928–29	Third Division South	8	1	1	0	9	1
Brentford	1930–31	Third Division South	4	0	1	0	5	0
Brentford	1931–32	Third Division South	3	0	0	0	3	0
Brentford	Total		62	12	2	0	64	12
Luton Town	1933–34	Third Division South	1	0	0	0	1	0
Career Total			76	14	5	0	80	14

== Honours ==
Brentford Reserves

- London Combination: 1931–32, 1932–33
