= Albert Fletcher =

Albert Fletcher may refer to:

- Albert Fletcher (footballer, born 1867), English footballer for England and Wolverhampton Wanderers
- Albert Fletcher (footballer, born 1898), English footballer for Brentford and West Ham
- Albert Lewis Fletcher, American prelate of the Roman Catholic Church
