= Ernie Watkins (footballer, born 1898) =

English footballer (1898–1976)

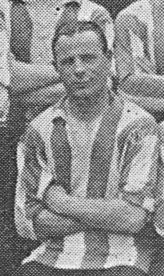
- Watkins while with Brentford in 1926

Personal information
- Full name: Ernest Thomas Watkins
- Date of birth: 3 April 1898
- Place of birth: Finchley, England
- Date of death: 10 October 1976 (aged 78)
- Place of death: Finchley, England
- Height: 5 ft 8 in (1.73 m)
- Position: Forward

Senior career*
Years	Team	Apps	(Gls)
1920–1921	Barnet		
1921–1922	Finchley		
1922–1924	Birmingham	8	(1)
1924–1926	Southend United	32	(15)
1926–1930	Brentford	120	(55)
1930	Millwall	6	(0)
1930–1931	Fulham	17	(10)
1931	Gillingham	4	(0)
1931–1932	Charlton Athletic	15	(6)
- * Club domestic league appearances and goals

Ernest Thomas Watkins (3 April 1898 – 10 October 1976) was an English professional footballer who scored 87 goals from 202 appearances in the Football League playing for Birmingham, Southend United, Brentford, Millwall, Fulham, Gillingham and Charlton Athletic.

== Playing career ==
Watkins was born in Finchley, which was then part of Middlesex. He began his playing career in local football with Barnet and Finchley before joining Birmingham in October 1922. He went straight into the starting XI for his debut in the First Division on 4 November in a goalless draw at home to Cardiff City. He scored in the return fixture the following week, and kept his place for a few more games before dropping to the reserves. After that he played only twice more for the first team, standing in for the unavailable Jackie Whitehouse, then returned to the south-east of England in February 1924 to join Southend United.

Watkins scored at a rate of a goal every other game for Southend, with 17 goals from 34 games in all competitions, including 15 from 32 in the Third Division South, but late in 1925 he was required to play for the reserves. He scored four goals as Southend beat Chelsea reserves 5–1 in the London Combination on New Year's Eve, but a "breach of club rules" occurring later that day brought the player a two-week suspension and a place on the transfer list. A few days later he signed for fellow Third Division club Brentford in a £1000 transfer, at the time the club's record fee paid.

Described as "a goal poacher whose best work was done inside the area", Watkins was Brentford's leading scorer in both the 1926–27 and 1928–29 seasons (becoming the first Bees player to hit 20 league goals in a season) and, as of 2014, lay eighth in the club's all-time scorers list with 59 goals from 130 appearances. In February 1930 he joined Millwall of the Second Division, and then completed his tour of London- and Kent-based Third Division clubs which took in spells with Fulham, Gillingham and Charlton Athletic. In February 1932, while a Charlton player, he sustained a knee injury which forced his retirement from the game at the end of the 1931–32 season.

Watkins died in his native Finchley on 10 October 1976 at the age of 78.

== Career statistics ==
Appearances and goals by club, season and competition
Club	Season	League			FA Cup		Total	
Club	Season	Division	Apps	Goals	Apps	Goals	Apps	Goals
Birmingham	1922–23	First Division	8	1	0	0	8	1
Southend United	1923–24	Third Division South	15	4	0	0	15	4
Southend United	1924–25	Third Division South	2	0	0	0	2	0
Southend United	1925–26	Third Division South	15	11	2	2	17	13
Southend United	Total		32	15	2	2	34	17
Brentford	1925–26	Third Division South	19	11	—		19	11
Brentford	1926–27	Third Division South	35	20	7	4	42	24
Brentford	1927–28	Third Division South	29	10	1	0	30	10
Brentford	1928–29	Third Division South	36	14	2	0	38	14
Brentford	1929–30	Third Division South	1	0	0	0	1	0
Brentford	Total		120	55	10	4	130	59
Millwall	1929–30	Second Division	6	0	0	0	6	0
Fulham	1930–31	Third Division South	17	10	3	2	20	12
Gillingham	1931–32	Third Division South	4	0	—		4	0
Charlton Athletic	1931–32	Second Division	15	6	1	0	16	6
Career totals			202	87	16	8	218	95

== Honours ==
Brentford

- London Charity Fund: 1928
