= Stephen Dearn =

English footballer

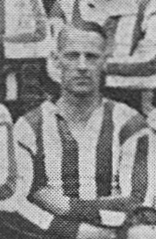
- Dearn while with Brentford in 1927.

Personal information
- Full name: Stephen Dearn
- Date of birth: March 1901
- Place of birth: Halesowen, England
- Date of death: 1947 (aged 45–46)
- Height: 5 ft 8 in (1.73 m)
- Positions: Inside forward; left half

Youth career
- Halesowen Town

Senior career*
Years	Team	Apps	(Gls)
	Aston Villa	0	(0)
1924–1926	Portsmouth	20	(2)
1926–1929	Brentford	82	(9)
- * Club domestic league appearances and goals

Stephen Dearn (March 1901 – 1947) was an English professional footballer who made over 100 appearances as an inside forward and left half in the Football League for Brentford and Portsmouth.

== Career statistics ==
Appearances and goals by club, season and competition
Club	Season	League			FA Cup		Total	
Club	Season	Division	Apps	Goals	Apps	Goals	Apps	Goals
Portsmouth	1923–24	Third Division South	1	2	1	0	2	2
Portsmouth	1924–25	Second Division	17	2	0	0	17	2
Portsmouth	1925–26	Second Division	3	0	0	0	3	0
Portsmouth	Total		21	4	1	0	22	4
Brentford	1926–27	Third Division South	30	8	6	1	36	9
Brentford	1927–28	Third Division South	40	1	1	0	41	1
Brentford	1928–29	Third Division South	12	0	0	0	12	0
Brentford	Total		82	9	7	1	89	10
Career Total			103	13	8	1	111	14
