= Charlie Bosbury =

English footballer (1897–1929)

Personal information
- Full name: Charles Edwin Bosbury
- Date of birth: 5 December 1897
- Place of birth: Newhaven, England
- Date of death: 14 July 1929 (aged 31)
- Place of death: Lincoln, England
- Height: 6 ft 0 in (1.83 m)
- Position: Outside right

Senior career*
Years	Team	Apps	(Gls)
1914–19xx	Pemberton Billings		
1921–1922	Southampton	0	(0)
1922–1925	Birmingham	15	(0)
1925–1926	Preston North End	2	(0)
1926–1929	Lincoln City	85	(30)
- * Club domestic league appearances and goals

Charles Edwin Bosbury (5 December 1897 – 14 July 1929) was an English professional footballer who made more than 100 appearances in the Football League playing for Birmingham, Preston North End and Lincoln City. He played as an outside right.

== Football career ==
Bosbury was born in Newhaven, East Sussex. He joined Southampton in 1921, but did not appear for the first team before he moved on to First Division club Birmingham the following year. A tall, strongly built man with a talent for sprinting, Bosbury made his debut on 11 November 1922 in a 1–1 draw at Cardiff City. He played 15 times in the 1922–23 season, but lost his place to Bill Harvey and never regained it. In the 1925 close season he joined Preston North End, but played only twice in a year before moving on again, this time to Lincoln City. Described as able to "beat a man and centre on the run ... capable of cutting in and shooting with deadly effect", Bosbury scored 33 goals in 94 league and FA Cup games in two and a half years with Lincoln. He played his final game for the club in January 1929, despite feeling unwell. Diagnosed as suffering from tuberculosis, he died a few months later in Lincoln aged only 31.
