= Jimmy Drinnan =

Scottish footballer

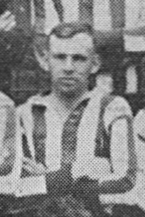
- Drinnan while with Brentford in 1927.

Personal information
- Full name: James McKay Drinnan
- Date of birth: 28 May 1906
- Place of birth: Harthill, Scotland
- Date of death: 1936 (aged 29–30)
- Place of death: London, England
- Height: 5 ft 6 in (1.68 m)
- Position: Inside forward

Youth career
- Larkhall Thistle

Senior career*
Years	Team	Apps	(Gls)
1923–1924	Bristol City	2	(0)
- Aberaman Athletic
1924–1925	Merthyr Town	15	(2)
1925–1927	Newport County	42	(11)
1927–1929	Brentford	43	(11)
1929–1930	Luton Town	31	(12)
1930–1931	Burnley	6	(2)
- Worcester City
- * Club domestic league appearances and goals

James McKay Drinnan (28 May 1906 – 1936) was a Scottish professional footballer who played as an inside forward in the Football League, most notably for Brentford, Newport County and Luton Town.

== Career statistics ==
Appearances and goals by club, season and competition
Club	Season	League			FA Cup		Total	
Club	Season	Division	Apps	Goals	Apps	Goals	Apps	Goals
Brentford	1927–28	Third Division South	18	6	0	0	18	6
Brentford	1928–29	Third Division South	25	5	2	1	27	6
Brentford	Total		43	11	2	1	45	12
Luton Town	1929–30	Third Division South	31	12	1	0	32	12
Career Total			74	23	3	1	77	24
