= Harold Crockford =

English footballer

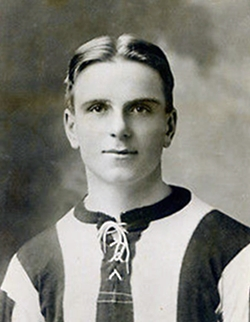
- Crockford while with Exeter City in 1922.

Personal information
- Full name: Harold Arthur Crockford
- Date of birth: 25 September 1893
- Place of birth: Derby, England
- Date of death: 15 December 1983 (aged 90)
- Place of death: Tunbridge Wells, England
- Height: 5 ft 11 in (1.80 m)
- Positions: Centre forward; inside forward

Senior career*
Years	Team	Apps	(Gls)
- Chatham
1916	→ Brentford (guest)	3	(0)
–1917	Vicar of Wakefield		
1919–1922	Fulham	26	(9)
1922–1923	Exeter City	30	(17)
1923	Port Vale	6	(2)
1923–1925	Chesterfield	52	(28)
1925	Gillingham	7	(1)
1925	Accrington Stanley	11	(5)
1925–1926	Walsall	24	(17)
1926–1927	Darlington	18	(8)
1927–1928	Norwich City	2	(0)
1928–1929	Bedford Town	31	(28)
1929	Tunbridge Wells Rangers		
Total		176+	(87+)
- * Club domestic league appearances and goals

Harold Arthur Crockford (25 September 1893 – 15 December 1983) was an English professional footballer who played as a forward in the Football League for Fulham, Exeter City, Port Vale, Chesterfield, Gillingham, Accrington Stanley, Walsall, Darlington and Norwich City.

== Career ==
Before and during the First World War, Crockford played for Chatham, Vicar of Wakefield and as a guest for Watford, Clapton Orient, Brentford and Southampton. Crockford joined Fulham in 1919 and scored 9 goals in 26 appearances during the 1919–20 and 1920–21 Second Division seasons, though he once missed the team bus for an away match at bury in April 1920. Crockford transferred to Exeter City during the 1922 off-season and scored 17 goals in 30 Third Division South appearances to finish as the club's top-scorer. He scored hat-tricks in matches against Reading and Newport County.

Crockford transferred to Port Vale in May 1923. He scored on his debut on 25 August, in a 2–1 victory over Crystal Palace at the Nest and scored again two days later in a 2–0 win over Sheffield Wednesday at the Old Recreation Ground. However, Vale lost the next four Second Division matches of the 1923–24 season and he left by mutual consent the next month due to his poor form, to be replaced by Tom Butler. Crockford moved on to play for Chesterfield, where he scored on his debut in a 4–0 win over Southport on 6 October 1923. He later played for Gillingham, Accrington Stanley, Walsall, Darlington, Norwich City, Bedford Town and Tunbridge Wells Rangers between 1925 and 1929.

== Personal life ==
Crockford served in the Royal Field Artillery during the First World War. After retiring as a player, he worked as a turf accountant near Stamford Bridge.

== Career statistics ==
Appearances and goals by club, season and competition
Club	Season	League			FA Cup		Other		Total	
Club	Season	Division	Apps	Goals	Apps	Goals	Apps	Goals	Apps	Goals
Fulham	1919–20	Second Division	11	7	0	0	—		11	7
Fulham	1920–21	Second Division	15	2	0	0	—		15	2
Fulham	Total		26	9	0	0	—		26	9
Exeter City	1922–23	Third Division South	30	17	1	0	—		31	17
Port Vale	1923–24	Second Division	6	2	—		—		6	2
Chesterfield	1923–24	Third Division North	33	19	2	0	3 (Note: 2 appearances and 2 goals in Derbyshire Senior Cup, 1 appearance in Chesterfield Hospital Senior Cup)	2	38	21
Chesterfield	1924–25	Third Division North	19	9	2	2	—		21	11
Chesterfield	Total		52	28	4	2	3	2	59	32
Gillingham	1924–25	Third Division South	7	1	—		—		7	1
Accrington Stanley	1925–26	Third Division North	11	5	—		—		11	5
Walsall	1925–26	Second Division	24	17	1	0	—		25	17
Darlington	1926–27	Second Division	18	8	2	0	—		20	8
Norwich City	1927–28	Third Division South	2	0	0	0	—		2	0
Career total			176	87	8	2	3	2	187	91
