= Jim Ferguson (footballer) =

Scottish footballer

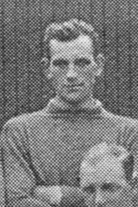
- Ferguson while with Brentford in 1926.

Personal information
- Full name: James Stirling Ferguson
- Date of birth: 13 August 1896
- Place of birth: Longriggend, Scotland
- Date of death: 21 September 1952 (aged 56)
- Place of death: Glasgow, Scotland
- Height: 6 ft 2 in (1.88 m)
- Position: Goalkeeper

Youth career
- 1915–1916: Airdriehall Shamrock

Senior career*
Years	Team	Apps	(Gls)
1916–1919	Partick Thistle	0	(0)
1919–1926	St Roch's		
1926–1928	Brentford	65	(0)
1928–1932	Notts County	158	(0)
1932–1933	Ayr United	3	(0)
- * Club domestic league appearances and goals

James Stirling Ferguson (13 August 1896 – 21 September 1952) was a Scottish professional footballer who made over 220 appearances as a goalkeeper in the Football League for Notts County and Brentford.

== Personal life ==
Ferguson's younger brother, Alex, was also a goalkeeper.

== Honours ==
Notts County

- Football League Third Division South: 1930–31

== Career statistics ==
Appearances and goals by club, season and competition
Club	Season	League			National Cup		Total	
Club	Season	Division	Apps	Goals	Apps	Goals	Apps	Goals
Brentford	1926–27	Third Division South	38	0	8	0	46	0
Brentford	1927–28	Third Division South	27	0	1	0	28	0
Brentford	Total		65	0	9	0	74	0
Ayr United	1932–33	Scottish First Division	3	0	0	0	3	0
Career total			68	0	9	0	77	0
