= 1926–27 Brentford F.C. season =

English football team season

Brentford
1926–27 season
- Chairman: W. Flewitt
- Manager: Harry Curtis
- Stadium: Griffin Park
- Third Division South: 11th
- FA Cup: Fifth round
- Top goalscorer: League: Watkins (20); All: Watkins (24)
- Highest home attendance: 20,799
- Lowest home attendance: 4,775
- Average home league attendance: 9,713
Home colours

During the 1926–27 English football season, Brentford competed in the Football League Third Division South. In Harry Curtis' first season as manager, the club finished 11th and advanced to the fifth round of the FA Cup for the first time.

== Season summary ==
Brentford's 1926–27 team photograph.

After just one top-half finish in the Third Division South since entering the Football League in 1920, Brentford appointed former Gillingham manager Harry Curtis to the position on a one-year contract in May 1926. The club was still seeking a winning formula, after generally poor league placings from previous managers Fred Halliday and Archie Mitchell. The directors of the club cleared the decks and retained just 9 of the previous season's squad. Curtis brought with him assistant trainer Jack Cartmell (an ex-Brentford player) and five Gillingham players – full backs Wally Barnard and Charlie Butler, half back Charlie Reddock and forwards Bill Berry and Joe Craddock. Former Gillingham half back Frank Marshall later signed in January 1927. Jim Ferguson replaced the departed John Thomson in goal and defenders John Hodgson, Ted Winship, half backs Bert Bellamy, Joe Hodnett and forwards George Anderson and Stephen Dearn were also signed.

A 4–0 victory over Brighton & Hove Albion on the opening day put Brentford at the top of the Third Division South table, which was the first time since joining the Football League that the club had occupied the top spot in the division. Defeat in the following match to Luton Town dropped the Bees back to 6th, but three successive wins in the following matches saw the club rise back to the top and they stayed there until 15 September. 10 goals in the first 9 matches from Ernie Watkins was a factor in the bright start. By early December, the team's league form was affected by a fixture pile-up, caused by a run to the fifth round of the FA Cup. The 8 FA Cup matches played in a single season is the most ever by the club. The run was a financial success and generated enough money for the club to build a new grandstand on the Braemar Road side of Griffin Park.

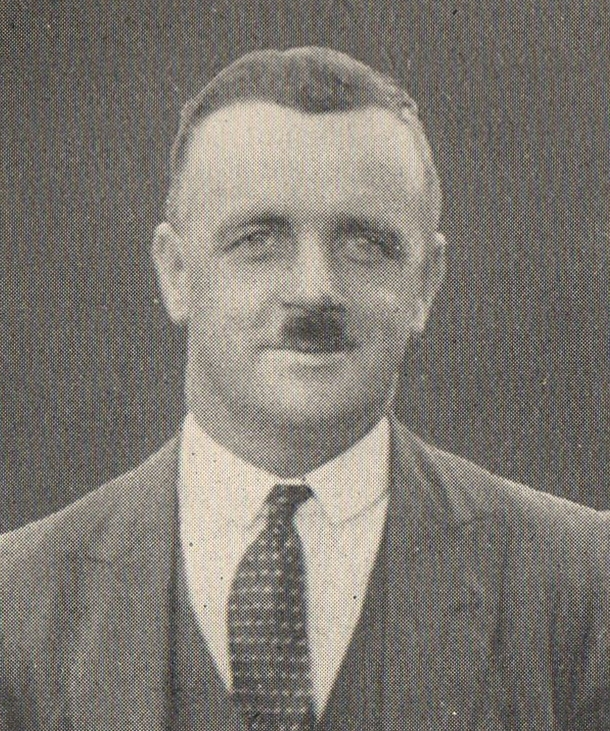
Harry Curtis would go on to become Brentford's longest-serving and most successful manager.

A goal drought suffered by forwards Ernie Watkins, Jack Lane, Stephen Dearn and the departure of Jack Allen to The Wednesday in March 1927 saw Brentford limp through the final three months of the season. The Bees finished the season in 11th place and had been rooted in mid-table since 5 February 1927. Ernie Watkins top-scored with 24 goals, then the highest tally for a Brentford player since the club joined the Football League. Four consecutive home league draws between 2 and 30 April 1927 equalled the club record.

A notable departure after the season was that of 38-year old cricketer Patsy Hendren, who had played intermittently as an outside forward for Brentford since 1907. During the season he had become the first Bees player since the club joined the Football League to score four goals in a match (during a 7–3 rout of Coventry City on 23 October 1926) and an 11,000 crowd turned up to see his final match against Newport County on Easter Saturday 1927. Upon his departure, Hendren's 400-plus Brentford appearances was then the club record and he was posthumously inducted into the club's Hall of Fame in May 2015.

== League table ==
Pos	Team	Pld	W	D	L	GF	GA	GAv	Pts
9	Newport County	42	19	6	17	57	71	0.803	44
10	Bristol Rovers	42	16	9	17	78	80	0.975	41
11	Brentford	42	13	14	15	70	61	1.148	40
12	Exeter City	42	15	10	17	76	73	1.041	40
13	Charlton Athletic	42	16	8	18	60	61	0.984	40

== Results ==
Brentford's goal tally listed first.

=== Legend ===
Win	Draw	Loss

=== Football League Third Division South ===
No.	Date	Opponent	Venue	Result	Attendance	Scorer(s)
1	28 August 1926	Brighton & Hove Albion	H	4–0	12,057	Rae (pen), Berry, Watkins (2)
2	30 August 1926	Luton Town	A	1–2	9,090	Dearn
3	4 September 1926	Northampton Town	A	3–2	10,082	Berry (2), Douglas
4	6 September 1926	Southend United	H	3–1	7,996	Watkins (2), Dearn
5	11 September 1926	Queens Park Rangers	H	4–2	17,380	Lane, Watkins (2), Douglas
6	15 September 1926	Southend United	A	1–3	6,512	Dearn
7	18 September 1926	Millwall	H	0–0	14,125	
8	25 September 1926	Bristol Rovers	A	3–1	8,311	Lane, Watkins (2)
9	2 October 1926	Swindon Town	H	2–2	15,404	Watkins (2)
10	9 October 1926	Exeter City	A	1–3	7,152	Lane
11	16 October 1926	Crystal Palace	A	3–4	14,860	Berry (2), Lane
12	23 October 1926	Coventry City	H	7–3	9,099	Hendren (4, 2 pens), Watkins, Dearn (2)
13	30 October 1926	Charlton Athletic	A	1–1	8,058	Rae
14	6 November 1926	Bristol City	H	3–0	11,457	Anderson (2), Dearn
15	20 November 1926	Plymouth Argyle	H	0–0	8,481	
16	4 December 1926	Aberdare Athletic	H	1–4	9,485	Baynham (og)
17	18 December 1926	Watford	H	3–0	9,631	Watkins, Dearn, Douglas
18	25 December 1926	Norwich City	A	1–2	10,743	Hendren
19	27 December 1926	Norwich City	H	3–0	17,002	Allen, Watkins, Douglas
20	1 January 1927	Luton Town	H	2–2	9,116	Lane, Dearn
21	15 January 1927	Brighton & Hove Albion	A	1–1	9,517	Hendren
22	22 January 1927	Northampton Town	H	1–1	4,775	Allen
23	5 February 1927	Millwall	A	0–3	19,178	
24	12 February 1927	Bristol Rovers	H	0–2	6,630	
25	26 February 1927	Exeter City	H	6–1	6,986	Watkins (2), Lane (2), Craddock, Douglas
26	5 March 1927	Crystal Palace	H	3–0	8,205	Watkins, Allen, Lane
27	9 March 1927	Swindon Town	A	2–4	4,659	Craddock, Hendren
28	12 March 1927	Coventry City	A	1–3	11,910	Watkins
29	16 March 1927	Bournemouth & Boscombe Athletic	A	1–3	3,195	Watkins
30	19 March 1927	Charlton Athletic	H	2–0	6,755	Donnelly (pen), Craddock
31	26 March 1927	Bristol City	A	0–1	14,062	
32	30 March 1927	Gillingham	A	2–1	2,947	Watkins, Lawson
33	2 April 1927	Bournemouth & Boscombe Athletic	H	0–0	6,766	
34	9 April 1927	Plymouth Argyle	A	1–2	9,556	Craddock
35	15 April 1927	Merthyr Town	H	1–1	9,031	Lane
36	16 April 1927	Newport County	H	1–1	7,801	Watkins
37	19 April 1927	Merthyr Town	A	0–1	3,910	
38	23 April 1927	Aberdare Athletic	A	1–3	1,227	Craddock
39	25 April 1927	Newport County	A	0–0	1,721	
40	30 April 1927	Gillingham	H	0–0	5,793	
41	5 May 1927	Queens Park Rangers	A	1–1	11,355	Lawson
42	7 May 1927	Watford	A	0–0	4,999	

=== FA Cup ===
Round	Date	Opponent	Venue	Result	Attendance	Scorer(s)
1R	27 November 1926	Clapton	A	1–1	4,412	Anderson
1R (replay)	1 December 1926	Clapton	H	7–3	5,936	Lane (2), Watkins (3), Hendren (2)
2R	11 December 1926	Gillingham	A	1–1	10,076	Hendren
2R (replay)	15 December 1926	Gillingham	H	1–0	6,695	Dearn
3R	10 January 1927	Oldham Athletic	A	4–2	10,670	Allen (3), Watkins
4R	29 January 1927	West Ham United	A	1–1	35,000	Lane
4R (replay)	2 February 1927	West Ham United	H	2–0	20,799	Lane, Allen
5R	19 February 1927	Reading	A	0–1	33,042	

- Sources: Statto, 11v11, 100 Years of Brentford

== Playing squad ==
Players' ages are as of the opening day of the 1926–27 season.

Pos.	Name	Nat.	Date of birth (age)	Signed from	Signed in	Notes
Goalkeepers
GK	Arthur Collins	(England)	16 September 1902 (aged 23)	Derby County	1926	
GK	Jim Ferguson	(Scotland)	30 August 1896 (aged 29)	St Roch's	1926	
Defenders
DF	Charlie Butler	(England)	10 October 1897 (aged 28)	Gillingham	1926	
DF	James Donnelly	(Republic of Ireland)	18 December 1893 (aged 32)	Southend United	1925	
DF	John Hodgson	(England)	28 September 1900 (aged 25)	Sunderland	1926	
DF	Ted Winship	(England)	1900 (aged 25–26)	Kidderminster Harriers	1926	
Midfielders
HB	Jack Beacham	(England)	15 August 1902 (aged 24)	Weymouth	1925	
HB	Bert Bellamy	(England)	7 April 1896 (aged 30)	Swansea Town	1926	
HB	Archie Clark	(England)	4 April 1902 (aged 24)	Aylesford Paper Mills	1927	
HB	Joe Hodnett	(England)	18 July 1896 (aged 30)	Merthyr Town	1926	
HB	Frank Marshall	(Scotland)	1904 (aged 21–22)	Gillingham	1927	
HB	Alan Noble	(England)	19 June 1900 (aged 26)	Leeds United	1925	
HB	Harry Rae	(Scotland)	22 October 1895 (aged 30)	Clyde	1925	
HB	Charlie Reddock	(Scotland)	1902 (aged 23–24)	Gillingham	1926	
Forwards
FW	George Anderson	(Scotland)	24 October 1904 (aged 21)	Airdrieonians	1926	
FW	Bill Berry	(England)	18 August 1904 (aged 22)	Gillingham	1926	
FW	Joe Craddock	(England)	3 August 1902 (aged 24)	Gillingham	1926	
FW	Stephen Dearn	(England)	March 1901 (aged 25)	Portsmouth	1926	
FW	Alfred Douglas	(England)	26 March 1899 (aged 27)	Washington Colliery	1925	
FW	Patsy Hendren	(England)	5 February 1889 (aged 37)	Queens Park Rangers	1911	Played when his cricket commitments allowed
FW	Jack Lane (c)	(England)	29 May 1898 (aged 28)	Chesterfield	1925	
FW	Herbert Lawson	(England)	12 April 1905 (aged 21)	Arsenal	1927	
FW	Ernie Watkins	(England)	3 April 1898 (aged 28)	Southend United	1926	
Players who left the club mid-season
FW	Jack Allen	(England)	31 January 1903 (aged 23)	Leeds United	1924	Transferred to The Wednesday

- Sources: 100 Years of Brentford, Timeless Bees, Football League Players' Records 1888 to 1939

== Coaching staff ==
Name	Role
(England) Harry Curtis	Manager
(England) Tom Ratcliff	Trainer
(England) Jack Cartmell	Assistant trainer

== Statistics ==
=== Appearances and goals ===

Brentford's highest appearance-makers in each position during the Football League season.

Pos	Nat	Name	League		FA Cup		Total	
Pos	Nat	Name	Apps	Goals	Apps	Goals	Apps	Goals
GK	(England)	Arthur Collins	4	0	0	0	4	0
GK	(Scotland)	Jim Ferguson	38	0	8	0	46	0
DF	(England)	Charlie Butler	27	0	8	0	35	0
DF	(Republic of Ireland)	James Donnelly	39	1	5	0	44	1
DF	(England)	John Hodgson	4	0	0	0	4	0
DF	(England)	Ted Winship	11	0	3	0	14	0
HB	(England)	Jack Beacham	14	0	6	0	20	0
HB	(England)	Bert Bellamy	33	0	6	0	39	0
HB	(England)	Archie Clark	1	0	—		1	0
HB	(England)	Joe Hodnett	9	0	0	0	9	0
HB	(Scotland)	Frank Marshall	21	0	—		21	0
HB	(England)	Alan Noble	10	0	2	0	12	0
HB	(Scotland)	Harry Rae	30	2	8	0	38	2
HB	(Scotland)	Charlie Reddock	6	0	0	0	6	0
FW	(England)	Jack Allen	7	3	4	4	11	7
FW	(Scotland)	George Anderson	8	2	1	1	9	3
FW	(England)	Bill Berry	22	5	2	0	24	5
FW	(England)	Joe Craddock	12	5	0	0	12	5
FW	(England)	Stephen Dearn	30	8	6	1	36	9
FW	(England)	Alfred Douglas	26	5	6	0	32	5
FW	(England)	Patsy Hendren	21	7	8	3	29	10
FW	(England)	Jack Lane	41	9	8	4	49	13
FW	(England)	Herbert Lawson	13	2	—		13	2
FW	(England)	Ernie Watkins	35	20	7	4	42	24

- Players listed in italics left the club mid-season.
- Source: 100 Years of Brentford

=== Goalscorers ===
Pos.	Nat	Player	FL3	FAC	Total
FW	(England)	Ernie Watkins	20	4	24
FW	(England)	Jack Lane	9	4	13
FW	(England)	Patsy Hendren	7	3	10
FW	(England)	Stephen Dearn	8	1	9
FW	(England)	Jack Allen	3	4	7
FW	(England)	Bill Berry	5	0	5
FW	(England)	Joe Craddock	5	0	5
FW	(England)	Alfred Douglas	5	0	5
FW	(Scotland)	George Anderson	2	1	3
FW	(England)	Herbert Lawson	2	0	2
HB	(Scotland)	Harry Rae	2	0	2
DF	(Republic of Ireland)	James Donnelly	1	0	1
Opponent			1	0	1
Total			70	17	87

- Players listed in italics left the club mid-season.
- Source: 100 Years of Brentford

=== Management ===
Name	Nat	From	To	Record All Comps					Record League				
Name	Nat	From	To	P	W	D	L	W %	P	W	D	L	W %
Harry Curtis	(England)	28 August 1926	7 May 1927	50	17	17	16	34.00|	42	13	14	15	30.95

=== Summary ===
Games played	50 (42 Third Division South, 8 FA Cup)
Games won	17 (13 Third Division South, 4 FA Cup)
Games drawn	17 (14 Third Division South, 3 FA Cup)
Games lost	16 (15 Third Division South, 1 FA Cup)
Goals scored	87 (70 Third Division South, 17 FA Cup)
Goals conceded	70 (61 Third Division South, 9 FA Cup)
Clean sheets	14 (12 Third Division South, 2 FA Cup)
Biggest league win	6–1 versus Exeter City, 26 February 1927
Worst league defeat	3–0 versus Millwall, 5 February 1927; 4–1 versus Aberdare Athletic, 4 December 1926
Most appearances	48, Jim Ferguson (38 Third Division South, 8 FA Cup)
Top scorer (league)	20, Ernie Watkins
Top scorer (all competitions)	24, Ernie Watkins

== Transfers & loans ==
Cricketers are not included in this list.

Players transferred in
Date	Pos.	Name	Previous club	Fee	Ref.
May 1926	HB	(England) Bert Bellamy	(Wales) Swansea Town	Free	
May 1926	GK	(England) Arthur Collins	(England) Derby County	Free	
June 1926	DF	(England) Wally Barnard	(England) Gillingham	Free	
June 1926	FW	(England) Bill Berry	(England) Gillingham	Free	
June 1926	GK	(Scotland) Jim Ferguson	(Scotland) St Roch's	Free	
June 1926	DF	(England) John Hodgson	(England) Sunderland	Free	
June 1926	HB	(Scotland) Charlie Reddock	(England) Gillingham	Free	
August 1926	DF	(England) Ted Winship	(England) Kidderminster Harriers	Free	
September 1926	DF	(England) Charlie Butler	(England) Gillingham	Free	
1926	FW	(Scotland) George Anderson	(Scotland) Airdrieonians	Free	
1926	FW	(England) James Birch	(England) Queens Park Rangers	Free	
1926	FW	(England) Joe Craddock	(England) Gillingham	Free	
1926	FW	(England) Stephen Dearn	(England) Portsmouth	Free	
1926	HB	(England) Joe Hodnett	(Wales) Merthyr Town	Free	
January 1927	HB	(Scotland) Frank Marshall	(England) Gillingham	£500	
March 1927	HB	(England) Archie Clark	(England) Aylesford Paper Mills	Free	
March 1927	FW	(England) Herbert Lawson	(England) Arsenal	Free	
Players transferred out
Date	Pos.	Name	Subsequent club	Fee	Ref.
August 1926	FW	(England) Bert Young	(Wales) Bangor City	n/a	
8 March 1927	FW	(England) Jack Allen	(England) The Wednesday	£750	
Players released
Date	Pos.	Name	Subsequent club	Join date	Ref.
September 1926	FW	(Scotland) Bill Finlayson	(United States) Springfield Babes	1926	
May 1927	DF	(England) Wally Barnard	Retired		
May 1927	HB	(England) Bert Bellamy	(England) Wellingborough Town	May 1927	
May 1927	GK	(England) Arthur Collins	(England) Scarborough	August 1927	
May 1927	HB	(England) Jimmy Elliott	Retired		
May 1927	DF	(England) John Hodgson	(England) Hartlepools United	1927	
May 1927	HB	(England) Joe Hodnett	(England) Gillingham	August 1927	
May 1927	HB	(England) Alan Noble	(England) Millwall	May 1927	
May 1927	DF	(England) Jack Price	(England) Torquay United	28 June 1927	
May 1927	DF	(England) Percival Whitton	Retired		
May 1927	FW	(England) Bert Young	(Wales) Newport County	1927	
