= Harry White (footballer, born 1901) =

English footballer

Personal information
- Full name: Harold Barns White
- Date of birth: 15 January 1901
- Place of birth: Manor Park, Essex, England
- Date of death: 1983 (aged 81–82)
- Positions: Left-half; centre-forward

Senior career*
Years	Team	Apps	(Gls)
–1921	Leigh Ramblers		
1921–1923	Southend United	4	(0)
1925–?	Grays Thurrock United		

Managerial career
- 1929–?: Grays Thurrock United
- * Club domestic league appearances and goals

Harold Barns White (15 January 1901 – 1983) (Note: Joyce, 2012, gives his name as J. Harold White, born in Leyton. Mason, 1993, also gives his birthplace as Leyton.) was an English footballer who played in the Football League for Southend United. He played mainly at left-half, but also appeared as a centre-forward.

Born in Manor Park, London, White played cricket and football in Leigh-on-Sea, the latter with Southend and District League club Leigh Ramblers, where he scored 50 goals during the 1920–21 season.

White joined Southend United for the 1921–22 season. He made four appearances in the Third Division South in his two seasons with the club. He joined Grays Thurrock United in 1925. He was appointed as Grays Thurrock manager in June 1929.
