= John Cairns (footballer) =

Scottish footballer (1902–1965)

Personal information
- Full name: John Cairns
- Date of birth: 14 November 1902
- Place of birth: Glasgow, Scotland
- Date of death: June 1965 (aged 62)
- Place of death: Woolwich, England
- Position: Forward

Senior career*
| Years | Team | Apps | (Gls) |
- St Bernard's
- Broxburn United
- Dunfermline Athletic
- Kettering Town
| 1926 | Charlton Athletic | 7 | (2) |
| 1927–1928 | Brentford | 1 | (1) |
| 1928 | Leicester City | 0 | (0) |
| 1929 | Portsmouth | 0 | (0) |
- Kettering Town
- Margate
| 1932 | Toronto Scottish | 1 | (0) |
| 1933 | Rochdale | 5 | (0) |
- Ramsgate
- * Club domestic league appearances and goals

John Cairns (14 November 1902 – June 1965) was a Scottish professional football forward who played in the Football League for Charlton Athletic, Rochdale and Brentford.

== Career statistics ==
Appearances and goals by club, season and competition
| Club | Season | League | | | National Cup | | Total | |
| Club | Season | Division | Apps | Goals | Apps | Goals | Apps | Goals |
|---|---|---|---|---|---|---|---|---|
| Brentford | 1927–28 | Third Division South | 1 | 1 | 0 | 0 | 1 | 1 |
| Toronto Scottish | 1932 | Canadian National Soccer League | 1 | 0 | — | | 1 | 0 |
| Rochdale | 1932–33 | Third Division North | 5 | 0 | 0 | 0 | 5 | 0 |
| Career total | | | 7 | 1 | 0 | 0 | 7 | 1 |
