= Frank Marshall (footballer, born 1904) =

Scottish footballer

Personal information
- Full name: Francis Marshall
- Date of birth: 1904
- Place of birth: Shettleston, Scotland
- Date of death: 14 July 1928 (aged 24)
- Place of death: Glasgow, Scotland
- Positions: Inside forward; right half

Youth career
- Shawfield

Senior career*
Years	Team	Apps	(Gls)
- Shettleston
	Rangers	0	(0)
	Falkirk	15	(4)
1924–1927	Gillingham	101	(17)
1927–1928	Brentford	21	(0)
- * Club domestic league appearances and goals

Francis Marshall (1904 – 14 July 1928) was a Scottish professional footballer who played in the Football League for Brentford and Gillingham as an inside forward. He made over 100 appearances for the latter club.

== Career ==
Marshall began his career in Scotland as a youth with Shawfield Juniors and progressed to play for hometown club Shettleston. He had trial spells with Scottish league clubs Rangers, Falkirk and Partick Thistle, before moving to England to join Third Division South club Gillingham in 1924. He flourished under Harry Curtis's management and made over 100 appearances for the Gills. Curtis departed Priestfield in May 1926 to take over the manager's job at league rivals Brentford and Marshall followed in January 1927 for a £500 fee. He took over as the team's right half for the remainder of the 1926–27 season and made 21 appearances. He failed to make an appearance during the 1927–28 season due to illness.

== Personal life ==
Marshall was a freemason. He returned to Glasgow for a summer holiday in 1927 and caught tuberculosis, from which he died in July 1928.

== Career statistics ==
Appearances and goals by club, season and competition
Club	Season	League			FA Cup		Total	
Club	Season	Division	Apps	Goals	Apps	Goals	Apps	Goals
Gillingham	1924–25	Third Division South	41	9	7	2	48	2
Gillingham	1925–26	Third Division South	39	5	2	1	41	6
Gillingham	1926–27	Third Division South	21	3	4	1	25	4
Gillingham	Total		101	17	13	4	114	20
Brentford	1926–27	Third Division South	21	0	—		21	0
Career total			122	17	13	4	135	20
