= Frank Sharp (footballer, born 1899) =

English footballer

Personal information
- Full name: Frank William Sharp
- Date of birth: 26 April 1899
- Place of birth: Tintwistle, Cheshire, England
- Date of death: 15 March 1963 (aged 63) (Note: A different death date, 20 February 1963, is listed on a personal genealogy page.)
- Place of death: Maghull, Lancashire, England
- Height: 5 ft 7 in (1.70 m)
- Position: Inside forward

Senior career*
Years	Team	Apps	(Gls)
191?–1919	Barton BSC		
1919–1922	Mossley		
1922–1923	Birmingham	5	(0)
1923–1924	Chesterfield	22	(7)
1924–192?	Stourbridge		
–	Stalybridge Celtic		
1926–1927	Mossley		
- * Club domestic league appearances and goals

Frank William Sharp (26 April 1899 – 15 March 1963) was an English professional footballer who played in the Football League for Birmingham and Chesterfield. He played as an inside forward.

Sharp was born in Tintwistle, which was then part of Cheshire. He worked in a steelworks and played football part-time for Barton BSC and for Mossley before turning professional with Birmingham in 1922. He made his debut in the First Division on 6 September 1922, deputising for Jackie Whitehouse in an away game against Newcastle United which finished goalless. He kept his place until Whitehouse regained fitness, but did not play again; a creative player, he was uncomfortable with a more attacking role. He moved on to Chesterfield of the Third Division North in 1923, for whom he scored seven goals in 22 league appearances. He then returned to non-league football with Stourbridge, Stalybridge Celtic, and a second spell with Mossley; over his Mossley career he scored 28 goals in 60 appearances.
