= Jack Phillips (footballer, born 1903) =

Welsh footballer

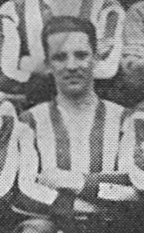
- Phillips while with Brentford in 1927.

Personal information
- Full name: John Phillips
- Date of birth: 28 May 1903
- Place of birth: Barry, Wales
- Date of death: 1985 (aged 81–82)
- Place of death: Merthyr Tydfil, Wales
- Height: 5 ft 10 in (1.78 m)
- Position: Forward

Youth career
- –1923: Barry Brooklands
- 1923: Burton All Saints

Senior career*
Years	Team	Apps	(Gls)
1923	West Bromwich Albion	0	(0)
1923	Rochdale	0	(0)
1924–1925	Southend United	8	(1)
1925–1927	Merthyr Town	57	(31)
1927–1928	Brentford	29	(22)
1928–1929	Bristol Rovers	65	(36)
1930–1931	Coventry City	25	(17)
1931–1932	Merthyr Town		
- Barry
–1937	Troedyrhiw		
Total		179	(107)
- * Club domestic league appearances and goals

John Phillips (28 May 1903 – 1985) was a Welsh professional footballer who played as a forward in the Football League, most notably for Bristol Rovers and Merthyr Town. He finished his league career with 107 goals in 179 appearances.

== Career ==
Phillips began his Football League career with spells at West Bromwich Albion, Rochdale and Southend United and with all of whom he received little playing time. He returned to Wales to sign for Third Division South club Merthyr Town in 1925 and scored 31 goals in 57 league appearances during two seasons with the club. Phillips joined Third Division South club Brentford for a £650 fee in July 1927. Despite missing 19 league games, he showed prolific form, scoring 18 goals in 23 matches during the 1927–28 season. He began the 1928–29 season in similar form, scoring four goals in his six four games, before being sold on 26 September 1928. He again scored prolifically in spells with Bristol Rovers and Coventry City, before ending his career in Wales with Merthyr Town, Barry and Troedyrhiw.

== Personal life ==
As of 1939, Phillips was club steward at a Labour Club in Barry, at which he also resided.

== Career statistics ==
Appearances and goals by club, season and competition
Club	Season	League			FA Cup		Total	
Club	Season	Division	Apps	Goals	Apps	Goals	Apps	Goals
Southend United	1924–25	Third Division South	8	1	0	0	8	1
Brentford	1927–28	Third Division South	23	18	0	0	23	18
Brentford	1928–29	Third Division South	6	4	—		6	4
Brentford	Total		29	22	0	0	29	22
Coventry City	1930–31	Third Division South	25	17	3	1	28	18
Career Total			62	40	3	1	65	41
