= Dick Hendrie =

Scottish footballer

- Hendrie while with Brentford in 1927

Personal information
- Full name: Richard Hendrie
- Date of birth: 22 November 1895
- Place of birth: Airdrie, Scotland
- Date of death: 15 April 1964 (aged 71)
- Place of death: Maidstone, England
- Position: Left back

Senior career*
Years	Team	Apps	(Gls)
–1916	Petershill		
1916–1917	Heart of Midlothian	0	(0)
1917–1920	Queen's Park	2	(0)
1919	→ Airdrieonians (loan)	1	(0)
1920–1923	Maidstone United		
1923–1925	Gillingham	71	(0)
- Margate
–1927	Grays Thurrock United		
1927–1929	Brentford	0	(0)

Managerial career
- 1929–1931: Gillingham
- Tunbridge Wells Rangers
- * Club domestic league appearances and goals

Richard Hendrie (22 November 1895 – 15 April 1964) was a Scottish professional footballer, best remembered for his spells as left back and manager in the Football League with Gillingham.

== Playing career ==
Hendrie played for Petershill, Queen's Park and Airdrieonians in his native Scotland. Either side of a two-year spell with Third Division South club Gillingham, Hendrie played English non-League football for Maidstone United, Margate and Grays Thurrock United. He ended his career with Third Division South club Brentford and retired in 1929.

== Managerial and coaching career ==
While a player at Brentford between 1927 and 1929, Hendrie served as assistant to manager Harry Curtis. He returned to Gillingham in 1929 and managed the club until 1931, when he returned to the Southern League to manage Tunbridge Wells Rangers.

== Personal life ==
Hendrie served as a signalman in the Royal Naval Volunteer Reserve during the First World War.

== Career statistics ==
Appearances and goals by club, season and competition
Club	Season	League			National cup (Note: Includes Scottish Cup, FA Cup)		Total	
Club	Season	Division	Apps	Goals	Apps	Goals	Apps	Goals
Queen's Park	1916–17	Scottish First Division	2	0	—		2	0
Airdrieonians (loan)	1918–19	Scottish First Division	1	0	—		1	0
Gillingham	1923–24	Third Division South	40	0	4	0	44	0
Gillingham	1924–25	Third Division South	25	0	3	0	28	0
Gillingham	1925–26	Third Division South	6	0	0	0	6	0
Gillingham	Total		71	0	7	0	78	0
Brentford	1927–28	Third Division South	0	0	1	0	1	0
Career total			74	0	8	0	82	0
