= Henry Bailey (footballer) =

English footballer (1897–1965)

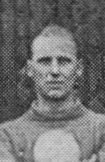
- Bailey while with Brentford in 1927.

Personal information
- Full name: Henry Bailey
- Date of birth: 2 December 1897
- Place of birth: Macclesfield, England
- Date of death: 1965 (aged 67–68)
- Place of death: Hammersmith, England
- Position: Goalkeeper

Senior career*
Years	Team	Apps	(Gls)
1912–1913	St Albans		
–1920	Millwall Athletic		
1920–1923	Luton Town	82	(0)
1923–1927	Exeter City	143	(0)
1927–1929	Brentford	44	(0)
1929–1932	Thames	29	(0)
- * Club domestic league appearances and goals

Henry Bailey (2 December 1897 – 1965), sometimes known as Harry Bailey, was an English professional footballer who made over 140 appearances as a goalkeeper in the Football League for Exeter City. He also played league football for Luton Town, Brentford and Thames.

== Personal life ==
Bailey enlisted in the Grenadier Guards in 1913 and served with the regiment during the First World War.

== Career statistics ==
Appearances and goals by club, season and competition
Club	Season	League			FA Cup		Total	
Club	Season	Division	Apps	Goals	Apps	Goals	Apps	Goals
Luton Town	1920–21	Third Division	38	0	4	0	42	0
Luton Town	1921–22	Third Division South	42	0	3	0	45	0
Luton Town	1922–23	Third Division South	2	0	0	0	2	0
Luton Town	Total		82	0	7	0	89	0
Brentford	1927–28	Third Division South	15	0	0	0	15	0
Brentford	1928–29	Third Division South	29	0	1	0	30	0
Brentford	Total		44	0	1	0	45	0
Career Total			126	0	8	0	134	0
