= Alex Ferguson (footballer, born 1903) =

Scottish footballer

Personal information
- Full name: Alexander Stirling Brown Ferguson
- Date of birth: 5 August 1903
- Place of birth: Lochore, Scotland
- Date of death: 23 November 1974 (aged 71)
- Place of death: Swansea, Wales
- Height: 6 ft 0 in (1.83 m)
- Position: Goalkeeper

Youth career
- Vale of Clyde

Senior career*
Years	Team	Apps	(Gls)
1924–1925	Wigan Borough	1	(0)
1925–1927	Gillingham	73	(0)
1927–1936	Swansea Town	280	(0)
1936–1938	Bury	63	(0)
1938–1946	Newport County	44	(0)
1946–1947	Bristol City	32	(0)
1947–1949	Swindon Town	7	(0)
- * Club domestic league appearances and goals

Alexander Stirling Brown Ferguson (5 August 1903 – 23 November 1974) was a Scottish professional footballer. Born in Lochore, he played for Wigan Borough, Gillingham, Swansea Town, Bury, Newport County, Bristol City and Swindon Town between 1924 and 1949.

== Personal life ==
Ferguson's older brother Jim was also a professional goalkeeper.
