= Bill Dempsey (footballer) =

English footballer

Personal information
- Full name: William Watson Dempsey
- Date of birth: 10 September 1896
- Place of birth: St Germans, England
- Date of death: 1967 (aged 70–71)
- Place of death: Weymouth, England
- Positions: Inside forward; left back

Senior career*
Years	Team	Apps	(Gls)
- Cawsand
- Portland United
- RAF Felixstowe
1924–1925	Ipswich Town	14	(13)
1925–	Norwich City	8	(0)
- London Prison OS
1927–1928	Brentford	0	(0)
1928–1929	Queens Park Rangers	0	(0)
- Tunbridge Wells Rangers
- Grays Thurrock
- Canterbury Waverley
1933–1936	Weymouth	106	(13)
- * Club domestic league appearances and goals

William Watson Dempsey (10 September 1896 – 1967) was an English professional footballer who played in the Football League for Norwich City as an inside forward and left back.

== Career statistics ==
Appearances and goals by club, season and competition
Club	Season	League			FA Cup		Other		Total	
Club	Season	Division	Apps	Goals	Apps	Goals	Apps	Goals	Apps	Goals
Ipswich Town	1924–25	Southern Amateur League	14	13	―		3 (Note: 2 appearances and 3 goals in AFA Cup, 1 appearance and 4 goals in Suffolk Senior Cup)	7	17	20
Career total			14	13	0	0	3	7	17	20
