= Freddy Wood =

English footballer

Personal information
- Full name: Frederick W. Raymond Wood
- Date of birth: 21 September 1889
- Place of birth: Southfleet, England
- Date of death: 1954 (aged 64–65)
- Position: Goalkeeper

Senior career*
Years	Team	Apps	(Gls)
- Tufnell Park
- Clapton
- Crystal Palace
1920–1921	Millwall Athletic	4	(0)
1922–1925	Charlton Athletic	92	(0)
1925–?	Grays Thurrock United		
- Bostall Heath
- * Club domestic league appearances and goals

Frederick W. Raymond Wood (21 September 1889 – 1954) was a footballer who played as a goalkeeper for Millwall Athletic and Charlton Athletic in the Football League. He also played for Clapton and Crystal Palace, before joining Grays Thurrock United in 1925.
