= Arthur Collins (footballer, born 1902) =

English footballer

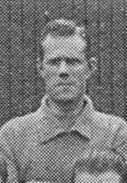
- Collins while with Brentford in 1926.

Personal information
- Full name: Arthur Henry Collins
- Date of birth: 16 September 1902
- Place of birth: Smethwick, England
- Date of death: March 1974 (aged 71)
- Place of death: Chesterfield, England
- Position: Goalkeeper

Senior career*
Years	Team	Apps	(Gls)
- Clay Cross Town
1924	Derby County	0	(0)
1926–1927	Brentford	4	(0)
- Scarborough
- Mansfield Town
- * Club domestic league appearances and goals

Arthur Henry Collins (16 September 1902 – March 1974) was an English professional footballer who played as a goalkeeper in the Football League for Brentford.

== Career statistics ==
Appearances and goals by club, season and competition
Club	Season	League			FA Cup		Total	
Club	Season	Division	Apps	Goals	Apps	Goals	Apps	Goals
Brentford	1926–27	Third Division South	4	0	0	0	4	0
Career total			4	0	0	0	4	0
