= John Hodgson (footballer, born 1900) =

English footballer

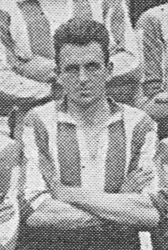
- Hodgson while with Brentford in 1926

Personal information
- Date of birth: 28 September 1900
- Place of birth: Binchester, England
- Date of death: 3 January 1959 (aged 58)
- Place of death: Palmerston North, New Zealand
- Height: 5 ft 9 in (1.75 m)
- Position: Full back

Youth career
- Horden Colliery Welfare

Senior career*
Years	Team	Apps	(Gls)
1925	Sunderland	0	(0)
1926–1927	Brentford	4	(0)
1927	Hartlepools United	0	(0)
- Montreal C.N.R.
- * Club domestic league appearances and goals

John William R. Hodgson (28 September 1900 – 3 January 1959) was an English professional footballer who played as a full back for Brentford in the Football League.

== Career statistics ==
Appearances and goals by club, season and competition
Club	Season	League			FA Cup		Total	
Club	Season	Division	Apps	Goals	Apps	Goals	Apps	Goals
Brentford	1926–27	Third Division South	4	0	0	0	4	0
Career total			4	0	0	0	4	0
