= Samuel Ward (footballer) =

Scottish footballer

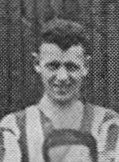
- Ward while with Brentford in 1927.

Personal information
- Full name: Samuel Ward
- Date of birth: 1 June 1906
- Place of birth: Dennistoun, Scotland
- Position: Centre half

Youth career
- –1926: Shawfield

Senior career*
Years	Team	Apps	(Gls)
1926–1927	Morton	18	(0)
1927–1928	Brentford	7	(0)
- * Club domestic league appearances and goals

Samuel Ward was a Scottish professional footballer who played as a centre half in the Scottish League for Morton. He also played in the Football League for Brentford.

== Career statistics ==
Appearances and goals by club, season and competition
Club	Season	League			National cup (Note: Includes Scottish Cup, FA Cup)		Total	
Club	Season	Division	Apps	Goals	Apps	Goals	Apps	Goals
Morton	1926–27	Scottish First Division	18	0	0	0	18	0
Brentford	1927–28	Third Division South	7	0	0	0	7	0
Career total			25	0	0	0	25	0
