= Jimmy Pipe =

English footballer

Personal information
- Full name: James Joyce Pipe
- Date of birth: 1 March 1909
- Place of birth: Blackheath, England
- Date of death: 1987 (aged 77–78)
- Position: Left back

Senior career*
Years	Team	Apps	(Gls)
1925–1926	Grays Thurrock		
1926–1933	Millwall	196	(0)
- * Club domestic league appearances and goals

James Joyce Pipe (1 March 1909 – 1987) was an English footballer who played as a left back for Millwall in the Football League making 196 appearances. He also played for Grays Thurrock United.
