= Joe Hodnett =

English footballer

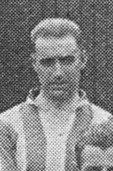
- Hodnett with Brentford in 1926.

Personal information
- Full name: Joseph Edward Hodnett
- Date of birth: 18 July 1896
- Place of birth: Bilston, England
- Date of death: 8 December 1943 (aged 47)
- Place of death: Willenhall, England
- Height: 5 ft 8 1/2 in (1.74 m)
- Position: Half back

Senior career*
Years	Team	Apps	(Gls)
1914–	Willenhall		
1919–1923	Wolverhampton Wanderers	75	(5)
1923–1934	Pontypridd		
1924–1925	Chesterfield	12	(1)
1925–1926	Merthyr Town	22	(0)
1926–1927	Brentford	9	(0)
1927–1928	Gillingham	16	(0)
1928–1929	Stafford Rangers		
1929–1930	Stourbridge		
1930–1931	Halesowen Town		
1931–1932	Dudley Town		
- Brierley Hill Alliance
Total		134	(7)
- * Club domestic league appearances and goals

Joseph Edward Hodnett (18 July 1896 – 8 December 1943) was an English professional footballer who played as a half back in the Football League for Brentford, Chesterfield, Gillingham, Merthyr Town and Wolverhampton Wanderers.

== Career statistics ==
Appearances and goals by club, season and competition
Club	Season	League			FA Cup		Total	
Club	Season	Division	Apps	Goals	Apps	Goals	Apps	Goals
Wolverhampton Wanderers	1919–20	Second Division	12	1	0	0	12	1
Wolverhampton Wanderers	1920–21	Second Division	26	3	8	0	34	3
Wolverhampton Wanderers	1921–22	Second Division	14	0	0	0	14	0
Wolverhampton Wanderers	1922–23	Second Division	23	1	2	0	25	1
Wolverhampton Wanderers	Total		75	5	10	0	85	5
Chesterfield	1924–25	Third Division North	12	1	0	0	12	1
Brentford	1926–27	Third Division South	9	0	0	0	9	0
Gillingham	1927–28	Third Division South	16	0	1	0	17	0
Career total			112	6	11	0	123	6

== Honours ==
Wolverhampton Wanderers

- FA Cup runner-up: 1920–21
