= Ted Winship =

English footballer

- Winship while with Brentford in 1926.

Personal information
- Full name: Edward Winship
- Date of birth: 1901
- Place of birth: Prudhoe, England
- Date of death: 19 October 1929 (aged 27–28)
- Place of death: Brentford, England
- Height: 5 ft 9 in (1.75 m)
- Position: Full back

Youth career
- –1921: Prudhoe Castle

Senior career*
Years	Team	Apps	(Gls)
1920–1921	Crystal Palace	0	(0)
1921–1922	Prudhoe Castle		
1922–1925	Coventry City	79	(0)
1925–1926	Kidderminster Harriers		
1926–1929	Brentford	86	(0)
- * Club domestic league appearances and goals

Edward Winship (1901 – 19 October 1929) was an English professional footballer who played in the Football League for Brentford and Coventry City as a full back.

== Career ==
As a youth, Winship played for Northern Alliance club Prudhoe Castle. At age 19, he was signed by Second Division club Crystal Palace, but failed to make a senior appearance. He returned to Prudhoe Castle and moved back to the Second Division to join Coventry City in 1922. After making 84 appearances, he dropped back into non-League football with Birmingham & District League club Kidderminster Harriers in 1925, before returning to the Football League to join Third Division South club Brentford in August 1926, where he played the next three seasons.

== Illness and death ==
Winship was struck down with yellow jaundice and kidney problems in June 1929, but failed to recover and died five months later in Brentford Hospital. At the time of his death, he and his family lived around the corner from Brentford's Griffin Park ground and the club's directors donated the proceeds from a reserve team match to his widow Sarah and children. A week after his death, Brentford faced Norwich City at Griffin Park and prior to kick off, the 15,000 crowd stood in silence while a band played 'Abide with Me'. Winship was buried in Coventry after a service at St George's Church, Brentford.

== Career statistics ==
Appearances and goals by club, season and competition
Club	Season	League			FA Cup		Total	
Club	Season	Division	Apps	Goals	Apps	Goals	Apps	Goals
Coventry City	1922–23	Second Division	35	0	1	0	36	0
Coventry City	1923–24	Second Division	29	0	2	0	31	0
Coventry City	1924–25	Second Division	15	0	2	0	17	0
Coventry City	Total		79	0	5	0	84	0
Brentford	1926–27	Third Division South	11	0	3	0	14	0
Brentford	1927–28	Third Division South	41	0	1	0	42	0
Brentford	1928–29	Third Division South	34	0	2	0	36	0
Brentford	Total		86	0	6	0	92	0
Career Total			165	0	11	0	176	0
