= John Page (footballer, born 1901) =

English footballer

Personal information
- Full name: John Elliot Page
- Date of birth: 23 September 1901
- Place of birth: Grays, England
- Date of death: 1979 (aged 77–78)
- Positions: Inside forward; left-half

Senior career*
Years	Team	Apps	(Gls)
- Grays Thurrock United
1926–1930	Millwall	16	(3)
1930–1931	Luton Town	4	(1)
- Chatham Town
- * Club domestic league appearances and goals

John Elliot Page (23 September 1901 – 1979) was an English footballer who played in the Football League for Millwall and Luton Town. He played in either inside-forward position, or as a left-half.

Born in Grays, Essex, Page played for Grays Thurrock United before joining Millwall in April 1926. The move represented the highest transfer fee paid for a Kent League player. He made 16 appearances, scoring three goals, over four seasons with Millwall, before joining Luton Town in 1930. He spent a single season at Luton, making four appearances and scoring one goal. He then moved to Chatham Town.
