= Bert Bellamy =

English footballer

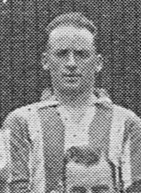
- Bellamy while with Brentford in 1926.

Personal information
- Full name: Herbert Bellamy
- Date of birth: 7 April 1896
- Place of birth: Kettering, England
- Date of death: 16 November 1978 (aged 82)
- Place of death: Grimsby, England
- Position: Wing half

Youth career
- Kettering Fuller Institute
- –1919: Kettering White Cross

Senior career*
| Years | Team | Apps | (Gls) |
| 1919–1921 | Kettering | | |
| 1921–1923 | Watford | 36 | (2) |
| 1923–1926 | Swansea Town | 90 | (2) |
| 1926–1927 | Brentford | 33 | (0) |
| 1927–1928 | Wellingborough | | |
| 1928 | Irthlingborough Town | | |
| 1928 | United Counties Bus Company | | |
| 1928 | Kidderminster Harriers | | |
| Total | | 159 | (4) |

Managerial career
- 1927–1928: Wellingborough (player-manager)
- 1929–1930: GBK Kokkola
- 1935–1937: HVV Den Haag
- 1937–1938: DHC Delft
- 1938–1939: Blauw-Wit Amsterdam
- * Club domestic league appearances and goals

Herbert Bellamy (7 April 1896 – 16 November 1978) was an English professional footballer who played as a wing half in the Football League for Watford, Swansea Town, and Brentford. He later managed Wellingborough, and in the Netherlands, and Finland.

== Personal life ==
Herbert was born in Kettering, the son of Edward Bellamy and Allen Barnes. He was married to Daisy York and had a daughter, Lucy Florence, and two sons, Herbert and Robert. Bellamy served in the British Army during the First World War before start of his professional career, served again during the Second World War with rank of sergeant, and after retirement from soccer play, he ran a pub in Folkestone, Kent.

== Career statistics ==
Appearances and goals by club, season and competition
| Club | Season | League | | | FA Cup | | Total | |
| Club | Season | Division | Apps | Goals | Apps | Goals | Apps | Goals |
|---|---|---|---|---|---|---|---|---|
| Watford | 1921–22 | Third Division South | 21 | 2 | 0 | 0 | 21 | 2 |
| Watford | 1922–23 | Third Division South | 15 | 0 | 1 | 0 | 16 | 0 |
| Watford | Total | | 36 | 2 | 1 | 0 | 37 | 2 |
| Brentford | 1926–27 | Third Division South | 33 | 0 | 6 | 0 | 39 | 0 |
| Career Total | | | 69 | 2 | 7 | 0 | 76 | 2 |

== Honours ==
Swansea Town

- Football League Third Division South: 1924–25
