= Jim McCafferty (footballer) =

Scottish footballer

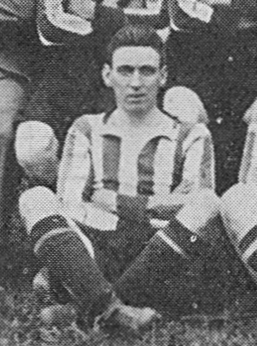
- McCafferty while with Brentford in 1927.

Personal information
- Full name: James McCafferty
- Date of birth: November 1900
- Place of birth: Stevenston, Scotland
- Date of death: March 1981 (aged 80)
- Place of death: Bromley, England
- Position: Outside forward

Youth career
- Wishaw

Senior career*
Years	Team	Apps	(Gls)
- Larkhall Thistle
- Duntocher Hibernian
–1924	Shieldmuir Celtic		
1924–1926	Motherwell	19	(0)
1925–1926	Halifax Town	20	(5)
1927–1929	Brentford	1	(0)
- Shieldmuir Celtic
1929–1930	Gillingham	14	(0)
- Vale of Leithen
- * Club domestic league appearances and goals

James McCafferty (November 1900 – March 1981), sometimes known as Joe McCafferty, was a Scottish professional footballer who played as an outside forward in the Football League for Halifax Town, Gillingham and Brentford.

== Career statistics ==
Appearances and goals by club, season and competition
Club	Season	League			National cup (Note: Includes Scottish Cup, FA Cup)		Total	
Club	Season	Division	Apps	Goals	Apps	Goals	Apps	Goals
Motherwell	1924–25	Scottish First Division	8	0	0	0	8	0
Motherwell	1925–26	Scottish First Division	11	0	0	0	11	0
Motherwell	Total		19	0	0	0	19	0
Brentford	1927–28	Third Division South	1	0	0	0	1	0
Gillingham	1929–30	Third Division South	14	0	1	0	15	0
Career total			34	0	1	0	35	0
