= Albert Rawson =

English footballer

Personal information
- Full name: Albert Noble Rawson
- Date of birth: 27 November 1896
- Place of birth: West Melton, England
- Date of death: 10 August 1949 (aged 52)
- Place of death: Sheffield, Yorkshire, England
- Height: 5 ft 11 1/2 in (1.82 m)
- Position: Forward

Senior career*
Years	Team	Apps	(Gls)
- Darnall Old Boys
1919–1923	Sheffield United	18	(7)
1923–1924	Birmingham	19	(9)
1924–1925	Barnsley	15	(6)
- * Club domestic league appearances and goals

Albert Noble Rawson (27 November 1896 – 10 August 1949) was an English professional footballer who played as a forward in the Football League for Sheffield United, Birmingham and Barnsley.

Rawson was born in West Melton, which was then in the West Riding of Yorkshire. He made his Football League debut with Sheffield United. He joined Birmingham in February 1923, and scored in each of his first five games, making a significant contribution to the club's remaining in the First Division. In 1924 he returned to Yorkshire and signed for Barnsley.

He later worked as a foreign and colonial correspondent. He died in 1949 and was survived by his widow, Lorna.
