= Stewart Low =

Scottish footballer

Personal information
- Full name: Stewart Low
- Place of birth: Scotland
- Position: Centre half

Senior career*
Years	Team	Apps	(Gls)
–1924	Broomhall Juniors		
1924	Lochgelly United	13	(0)
1924–1927	Montrose	38	(2)
1927–1928	Brentford	0	(0)
- * Club domestic league appearances and goals

Stewart Low was a Scottish professional footballer who played as a centre half in the Scottish League for Montrose and Lochgelly United.

== Career statistics ==
Appearances and goals by club, season and competition
Club	Season	League			National Cup		Total	
Club	Season	Division	Apps	Goals	Apps	Goals	Apps	Goals
Lochgelly United	1923–24	Scottish Second Division	13	0	1	0	14	0
Montrose	1924–25	Scottish Third Division	14	0	2	0	16	0
Montrose	1925–26	Scottish Third Division	24	2	8	0	32	2
Montrose	1926–27	Scottish Football Alliance	0	0	11	0	11	0
Montrose	Total		38	2	21	0	59	2
Career total			51	2	22	0	73	2
