= Fred Brown (footballer, born 1895) =

English footballer

Personal information
- Full name: Frederick Brown
- Date of birth: 28 June 1895
- Place of birth: Gainsborough, Lincolnshire, England
- Date of death: 6 November 1960 (aged 65)
- Place of death: Gainsborough, England
- Height: 5 ft 7 in (1.70 m)
- Position: Inside forward

Senior career*
Years	Team	Apps	(Gls)
1913–1919	Gainsborough Trinity		
1919–1923	Sheffield United	38	(8)
1923–1924	Brighton & Hove Albion	19	(3)
1924–1927	Gillingham	95	(26)
1927–1928	Gainsborough Trinity		
- * Club domestic league appearances and goals

Frederick Brown (28 June 1895 – 6 November 1960) was an English professional footballer who played as an inside forward. His clubs included Sheffield United, Brighton & Hove Albion and Gillingham.

== Career ==
The younger brother of former Sheffield United and England striker Arthur Brown Fred started his career with his hometown club of Gainsborough Trinity. During the war he would regularly guest for Sheffield United as he had taken up a job in a munitions factory in the city. After a spell in the army he joined the Blades on a full-time basis after the end of World War I where he played for four seasons. Never a regular first choice he made only 44 appearances for the club before moving to Brighton & Hove Albion and Gillingham.
