= Syd Smith (footballer, born 1895) =

English footballer

Sydney Joseph Smith (11 July 1895 – ?) was an English footballer of the 1920s. Born in Aston, he played professionally for Derby County, Norwich City, and Gillingham, making a total of eight appearances in The Football League.
