= Charlie Butler (English footballer) =

English footballer

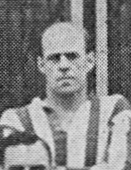
- Butler while with Brentford in 1927.

Personal information
- Full name: Charles Joseph Wells Butler
- Date of birth: 10 October 1897
- Place of birth: Watford, England
- Date of death: September 1963 (aged 65)
- Place of death: Harrow, England
- Position: Full back

Senior career*
Years	Team	Apps	(Gls)
- Ton Pentre
1922–1923	Manchester United	0	(0)
1923	Gillingham	13	(0)
1924	→ Grays Thurrock (loan)		
1924–1926	Gillingham	63	(0)
1926–1928	Brentford	67	(0)
1928	Montreal Carsteel		

International career
1912	England Schoolboys	1	(0)
- * Club domestic league appearances and goals

Charles Joseph Wells Butler (10 October 1897 – September 1963), sometimes known as Joe Butler, was an English professional footballer who played as a full back. After a brief spell with Manchester United in which he failed to break into the first-team, he played for Brentford and Gillingham between 1923 and 1928.

== Career statistics ==
Appearances and goals by club, season and competition
Club	Season	League			FA Cup		Total	
Club	Season	Division	Apps	Goals	Apps	Goals	Apps	Goals
Gillingham	1923–24	Third Division South	13	0	0	0	13	0
Gillingham	1924–25	Third Division South	21	0	4	0	25	0
Gillingham	1925–26	Third Division South	36	0	2	0	38	0
Gillingham	1926–27	Third Division South	6	0	—		6	0
Gillingham	Total		76	0	6	0	82	0
Brentford	1926–27	Third Division South	27	0	8	0	35	0
Brentford	1927–28	Third Division South	40	0	0	0	40	0
Brentford	Total		67	0	8	0	75	0
Career total			143	0	14	0	157	0
