= George Chance (footballer) =

English footballer

George Harold Chance (25 December 1896 – 11 July 1952) was an English professional footballer of the 1920s. Born in Stourbridge, he joined Gillingham from Bristol Rovers in 1924 and went on to make 40 appearances for the club in The Football League, scoring four goals. He joined Millwall in 1925, making 191 appearances and scoring 24 goals.
