= Arthur Sykes (footballer, born 1897) =

English footballer

Personal information
- Full name: Arthur Broughton Sykes
- Date of birth: 16 June 1897
- Place of birth: Grimsby, England
- Date of death: 1978 (aged 80–81)
- Position: Winger

Senior career*
Years	Team	Apps	(Gls)
1919–1920	Grimsby Rovers		
1920–1921	Grimsby Town	1	(0)
1921–1922	Grimsby Rovers		
1922–192?	Louth Town		
- * Club domestic league appearances and goals

Arthur Broughton Sykes (16 June 1897 – 1978) was an English professional footballer who played as a winger.
