= 1925–26 Arsenal F.C. season =

English football club season

Arsenal
1925–26 season
- Chairman: Henry Norris
- Manager: Herbert Chapman
- Stadium: Highbury
- First Division: 2nd
- FA Cup: Sixth round
- Top goalscorer: League: Jimmy Brain (34); All: Jimmy Brain (37)
- Highest home attendance: 71,446 vs. Aston Villa (24 February 1926)
- Lowest home attendance: 3,897 vs. Fulham (12 October 1925)

The 1925–26 season was Arsenal's seventh season in the top division of English football.

== Results ==
Arsenal's score comes first

=== Legend ===
Win	Draw	Loss

=== Football League First Division ===
Date	Opponent	Venue	Result	Attendance	Scorers
29 August 1925	Tottenham Hotspur	H	0–1		
31 August 1925	Leicester City	H	2–2		
5 September 1925	Manchester United	A	1–0		
7 September 1925	Leicester City	A	1–0		
12 September 1925	Liverpool	H	1–1		
19 September 1925	Burnley	A	2–2		
21 September 1925	West Ham United	H	3–2		
26 September 1925	Leeds United	H	4–1		
3 October 1925	Newcastle United	A	0–7		
5 October 1925	West Ham United	A	4–0		
10 October 1925	Bolton Wanderers	H	2–3		
17 October 1925	Cardiff City	H	5–0		
24 October 1925	Sheffield United	A	0–4		
31 October 1925	Everton	H	4–1		
7 November 1925	Manchester City	A	5–2		
14 November 1925	Bury	H	6–1		
21 November 1925	Blackburn Rovers	A	3–2		
28 November 1925	Sunderland	H	2–0		
5 December 1925	Huddersfield Town	A	2–2		
12 December 1925	West Bromwich Albion	H	1–0		
19 December 1925	Birmingham	A	0–1		
25 December 1925	Notts County	H	3–0		
26 December 1926	Notts County	A	1–4		
2 January 1926	Tottenham Hotspur	A	1–1		
16 January 1926	Manchester United	H	3–2		
23 January 1926	Liverpool	A	0–3		
3 February 1926	Burnley	H	1–2		
6 February 1926	Leeds United	A	2–4		
13 February 1926	Newcastle United	H	3–0		
27 February 1926	Cardiff City	A	0–0		
13 March 1926	Everton	A	3–2		
17 March 1926	Sheffield United	H	4–0		
20 March 1926	Manchester City	H	1–0		
27 March 1926	Bury	A	2–2		
2 April 1926	Aston Villa	A	0–2		
3 April 1926	Blackburn Rovers	H	2–1		
5 April 1926	Aston Villa	H	2–0		
10 April 1926	Sunderland	A	1–2		
17 April 1926	Huddersfield Town	H	3–1		
24 April 1926	West Bromwich Albion	A	1–2		
28 April 1926	Bolton Wanderers	A	1–1		
1 May 1926	Birmingham	H	3–0		

==== Final League table ====
Pos	Team	Pld	W	D	L	GF	GA	GAv	Pts
1	Huddersfield Town (C)	42	23	11	8	92	60	1.533	57
2	Arsenal	42	22	8	12	87	63	1.381	52
3	Sunderland	42	21	6	15	96	80	1.200	48
4	Bury	42	20	7	15	85	77	1.104	47
5	Sheffield United	42	19	8	15	102	82	1.244	46

Source: World Football
Rules for classification: 1) Points; 2) Goal average; 3) Goals scored
(C) Champions

=== FA Cup ===
Arsenal entered the FA Cup in the third round, in which they were drawn to face Wolverhampton Wanderers.

Round	Date	Opponent	Venue	Result	Attendance	Goalscorers
R3	9 January 1926	Wolverhampton Wanderers	A	1–1	42,083	Brain
R3 R	13 January 1926	Wolverhampton Wanderers	H	1–0	42,823	Baker
R4	30 January 1926	Blackburn Rovers	H	3–1	44,836	Brain, Haden, own goal
R5	20 February 1926	Aston Villa	A	1–1	55,400	Buchan
R5 R	24 February 1926	Aston Villa	H	2–0	71,446	Brain, Paterson
R6	6 March 1926	Swansea Town	A	1–2	25,198	Mackie

== See also ==
- 1925–26 in English football
- List of Arsenal F.C. seasons
