= Joe Craddock (footballer) =

English footballer

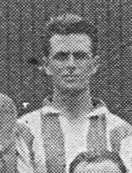
- Craddock with Brentford in 1926.

Personal information
- Full name: Claude William Craddock
- Date of birth: 3 August 1902
- Place of birth: Grimsby, England
- Date of death: October 1976 (aged 74)
- Place of death: Chatham, England
- Position: Forward

Senior career*
| Years | Team | Apps | (Gls) |
- Chatham Central
| 1920–1926 | Gillingham | 16 | (3) |
- → Sittingbourne (loan)
- → Grays Thurrock (loan)
| 1926–1928 | Brentford | 23 | (11) |
| 1928–1929 | Dundee | 20 | (7) |
- Sheppey United
| 1930–1931 | Rochdale | 34 | (10) |
| 1931 | Darlington | 10 | (2) |
- Tunbridge Wells Rangers
- * Club domestic league appearances and goals

Claude William Craddock (3 August 1902 – October 1976) was an English professional footballer who played as a forward in the Football League for Rochdale, Brentford, Gillingham and Darlington. He also played in the Scottish League for Dundee.

== Career statistics ==
Appearances and goals by club, season and competition
| Club | Season | League | | | National Cup | | Other | | Total | |
| Club | Season | Division | Apps | Goals | Apps | Goals | Apps | Goals | Apps | Goals |
|---|---|---|---|---|---|---|---|---|---|---|
| Gillingham | 1924–25 | Third Division South | 3 | 1 | 0 | 0 | — | | 3 | 1 |
| Gillingham | 1925–26 | Third Division South | 13 | 2 | 0 | 0 | — | | 13 | 2 |
| Gillingham | Total | | 16 | 3 | 0 | 0 | — | | 16 | 3 |
| Brentford | 1926–27 | Third Division South | 12 | 5 | 0 | 0 | — | | 12 | 5 |
| Brentford | 1927–28 | Third Division South | 11 | 6 | 1 | 0 | — | | 12 | 6 |
| Brentford | Total | | 23 | 11 | 1 | 0 | — | | 24 | 11 |
| Dundee | 1927–28 | Scottish First Division | 2 | 2 | 1 | 0 | — | | 3 | 2 |
| Dundee | 1928–29 | Scottish First Division | 18 | 5 | 3 | 1 | — | | 21 | 6 |
| Dundee | Total | | 20 | 7 | 4 | 1 | — | | 24 | 8 |
| Rochdale | 1930–31 | Third Division North | 34 | 10 | 1 | 0 | 4 (Note: 2 appearances in Lancashire Senior Cup, 2 appearances in Manchester Senior Cup) | 0 | 39 | 10 |
| Career total | | | 93 | 31 | 6 | 1 | 4 | 0 | 103 | 32 |
