= Tom Jones (footballer, born 1899) =

Welsh footballer

Personal information
- Full name: Thomas Jones
- Date of birth: 6 December 1899
- Place of birth: Penycae, Wales
- Date of death: 20 February 1978 (aged 78)
- Place of death: Cefn, Wales
- Height: 5 ft 8 in (1.73 m)
- Position: Defender

Senior career*
Years	Team	Apps	(Gls)
- Rhosymedre
1921–1922	Acrefair		
1922	Druids		
1922–1924	Oswestry Town		
1924–1937	Manchester United	189	(0)
1937–1939	Scunthorpe & Lindsey United		

International career
1926–1930	Wales	4	(0)
- * Club domestic league appearances and goals

Thomas Jones (6 December 1899 – 20 February 1978) was a Welsh professional footballer who played as a fullback for various clubs, as well as making four appearances for Wales between 1926 and 1930.

He played for Acrefair, Druids and Oswestry Town before moving to Manchester United where he made more than 150 appearances the Football League. He later played for Scunthorpe & Lindsey United.

== Club career ==
Born in Penycae, near Wrexham, Jones was the oldest of 14 children, He began his career playing amateur football for local sides Rhosymadre and Acrefair before signing for Druids, and later, Birmingham & District League side Oswestry Town in 1922.

Jones was spotted playing for Oswestry by Football League side Manchester United who promptly signed him. He made his debut for United at Portsmouth on 8 November 1924, and was part of the side that won promotion from the Second Division in his first season, deputising for the injured Frank Barson. He went on to make over 200 appearances for the club in all competitions during a 13-year spell. His last Football League appearance for United was during the 1936–37 season. His subsequent club was Scunthorpe & Lindsay United, where he was appointed club captain and helped the side win the Midland Football League in 1939.

== International career ==
Jones won his first cap for Wales in a 3–0 defeat to Ireland in the 1925–26 British Home Championship. He won further caps against Ireland and England the following year before winning his fourth and final cap in 1930 against Ireland.

== Later life ==
When the Second World War broke out, Jones returned to live in Wrexham where he guested for Chirk during the hostilities. After the war, he worked for the Monsanto Chemical Company and also worked as a coach for his former side Druids.
