= Norman Jones (footballer) =

English footballer

Personal information
- Full name: Norman Edward Jones
- Place of birth: Liverpool, England
- Position: Wing half

Senior career*
Years	Team	Apps	(Gls)
- Walker Celtic
1922–1923	Derby County	3	(0)
1923–1927	Gillingham	98	(2)
- * Club domestic league appearances and goals

Norman Edward Jones was an English professional footballer of the 1920s.

A native of Liverpool, Jones is known to have briefly played for Derby County in 1922–23, but subsequently spent four seasons of his career at Gillingham (1923–27).
