= George Anderson (footballer, born 1904) =

Scottish footballer

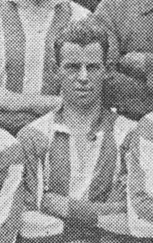
- Anderson while with Brentford in 1926.

Personal information
- Full name: George Russell Anderson
- Date of birth: 24 October 1904
- Place of birth: Saltcoats, Scotland
- Date of death: December 1974 (aged 70)
- Place of death: Cottenham, England
- Height: 5 ft 9 in (1.75 m)
- Position: Forward

Senior career*
Years	Team	Apps	(Gls)
–1925	Dalry Thistle		
1925–1926	Airdrieonians	10	(9)
1926–1927	Brentford	8	(2)
1927–1929	Chelsea	9	(0)
1929–1930	Norwich City	28	(12)
1930	Carlisle United	2	(1)
1930	Gillingham	0	(0)
1930–1932	Cowdenbeath	35	(7)
1932–1933	Yeovil & Petters United		
1933–1934	Bury	25	(10)
1934–1935	Huddersfield Town	14	(4)
1935–1936	Mansfield Town	36	(16)
- Newark
- Ayr United
- Saltcoats Victoria
- * Club domestic league appearances and goals

George Russell Anderson (24 October 1904 – December 1974) was a Scottish professional footballer who played in the Football League for a number of clubs as a forward.

== Career statistics ==
Appearances and goals by club, season and competition
Club	Season	League			National Cup		Total	
Club	Season	Division	Apps	Goals	Apps	Goals	Apps	Goals
Airdrieonians	1925–26	Scottish First Division	10	9	3	4	13	13
Brentford	1926–27	Third Division South	8	2	1	1	9	3
Chelsea	1927–28	First Division	5	0	0	0	5	0
Chelsea	1928–29	First Division	4	0	0	0	4	0
Chelsea	Total		9	0	0	0	9	0
Cowdenbeath	1930–31	Scottish First Division	16	2	4	2	20	4
Cowdenbeath	1931–32	Scottish First Division	19	5	2	1	21	6
Cowdenbeath	Total		35	7	6	3	41	10
Huddersfield Town	1934–35	First Division	14	4	0	0	14	4
Career total			76	22	10	8	86	30

== Sources ==
- Canary Citizens by Mike Davage, John Eastwood, Kevin Platt, published by Jarrold Publishing, (2001), ISBN 0-7117-2020-7
- 99 Years & Counting – Stats & Stories – Huddersfield Town History
