= Albert Fletcher (footballer, born 1898) =

English footballer

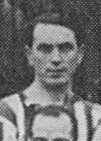
- Fletcher while with Brentford in 1927.

Personal information
- Full name: Albert William Fletcher
- Date of birth: 1898
- Place of birth: Wolverhampton, England
- Position: Half back

Senior career*
Years	Team	Apps	(Gls)
1922–1927	West Ham United	8	(1)
1927–1928	Brentford	33	(1)
- * Club domestic league appearances and goals

Albert William Fletcher, sometimes known as Bert Fletcher, was an English professional footballer who played as a half back in the Football League for Brentford and West Ham United.

== Career ==
=== West Ham United ===
Fletcher began his career with West Ham United and made his professional debut towards the end of the 1922–23 season, a successful campaign in which the Hammers won promotion to the First Division. Fletcher had a run in the team in September 1923, but managed just seven appearances during the whole of the 1923–24 season, scoring once. He was confined to the reserve team thereafter and departed Upton Park at the end of the 1926–27 season.

=== Brentford ===
Fletcher dropped down to the Third Division South to sign for Brentford in 1927. He was a regular pick at wing half and centre half during the 1927–28 season and made 33 appearances and scored one goal in his solitary season at Griffin Park.

=== Norwich City ===
After his departure from Brentford, Fletcher joined Third Division South club Norwich City on a trial basis, but he did not make a league appearance for the Canaries.

== Career statistics ==
Appearances and goals by club, season and competition
Club	Season	League			FA Cup		Total	
Club	Season	Division	Apps	Goals	Apps	Goals	Apps	Goals
West Ham United	1922–23	Second Division	1	0	0	0	1	0
West Ham United	1923–24	First Division	7	1	0	0	7	1
West Ham United	Total		8	1	0	0	8	1
Brentford	1927–28	Third Division South	33	1	0	0	33	1
Career Total			41	1	0	0	41	1
