= Charlie Reddock =

Scottish footballer (born 1902)

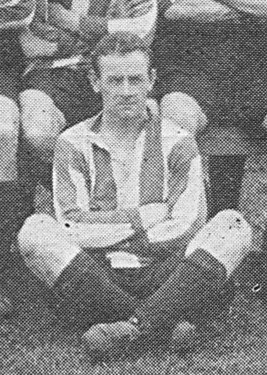
- Reddock while with Brentford in 1926.

Personal information
- Full name: Charles Reddock
- Date of birth: 1902
- Place of birth: Rutherglen, Scotland
- Position: Left half

Senior career*
Years	Team	Apps	(Gls)
1925–1926	Gillingham	29	(0)
1926–1930	Brentford	9	(0)
1930–1931	Thames	34	(0)
- * Club domestic league appearances and goals

Charles Reddock was a Scottish professional football left half of the 1920s. Born in Rutherglen, he joined Gillingham from Shettleston in 1925 and went on to make 29 appearances for the club in The Football League. He left to join Brentford in 1926 and made 9 appearances in a four-year spell, before finishing his career with Thames.

== Career statistics ==
Club statistics
Club	Season	League			FA Cup		Total	
Club	Season	Division	Apps	Goals	Apps	Goals	Apps	Goals
Gillingham	1925–26	Third Division South	29	0	1	0	30	0
Brentford	1926–27	Third Division South	6	0	0	0	6	0
Brentford	1928–29	Third Division South	3	0	0	0	3	0
Brentford	Total		9	0	0	0	9	0
Career total			38	0	1	0	39	0
