= Wally Barnard =

English footballer

Personal information
- Full name: Walter Eric Barnard
- Date of birth: 9 October 1898
- Place of birth: Tottenham, England
- Date of death: 1982 (aged 83–84)
- Position: Right back

Senior career*
Years	Team	Apps	(Gls)
–1922	Clapton		
1922–1923	Tottenham Hotspur	0	(0)
1923–1926	Gillingham	3	(0)
1926–1927	Brentford	0	(0)
- * Club domestic league appearances and goals

Walter Eric Barnard (9 October 1898 – 1982) was an English professional footballer who played in the Football League for Gillingham as a right back.

== Career statistics ==
Appearances and goals by club, season and competition
Club	Season	League			National Cup		Total	
Club	Season	Division	Apps	Goals	Apps	Goals	Apps	Goals
Gillingham	1923–24	Third Division South	3	0	0	0	3	0
Career total			3	0	0	0	3	0
