= Bill Harvey (footballer, born 1896) =

English footballer and cricketer

Personal information
- Full name: William Henry Harvey
- Date of birth: 22 December 1896
- Place of birth: Netley, England
- Date of death: 1972 (aged 75–76)
- Place of death: North Shields, England
- Height: 5 ft 9 in (1.75 m)
- Position: Outside right

Senior career*
Years	Team	Apps	(Gls)
- Yorkshire Amateurs
- West Riding Regiment
1919–1920	The Wednesday	19	(1)
1921–1925	Birmingham	78	(2)
1925–1926	Southend United	0	(0)

International career
- England Amateur

Managerial career
- 1927–1928: Birmingham
- 1932–1938: Chesterfield
- 1938–1939: Gillingham
- * Club domestic league appearances and goals

William Henry Harvey (12 April 1896 – 1972) was an English association football player and manager. He played as an outside right in the Football League for The Wednesday and Birmingham. He also played first-class cricket for Border and Warwickshire.

== Early life ==
Harvey was born at the Royal Victoria Hospital in Netley, near Southampton, in 1896.

== Playing career ==
Harvey played for The Wednesday, Birmingham and Southend United. His most successful spell was at Birmingham, where he made over 70 Football League appearances.

== Managerial career ==
Harvey managed Birmingham from 1927 to 1928, Chesterfield from 1932 to 1938 and Gillingham from 1938 to 1939.

He died in North Shields, Northumberland, in 1972.
