= Arthur Sykes (footballer, born 1902) =

English footballer

Personal information
- Full name: Arthur Victor Sykes
- Position: Goalkeeper

Senior career*
Years	Team	Apps	(Gls)
1924–1926	Gillingham	7	(0)
- * Club domestic league appearances and goals

Arthur Victor Sykes (born Swindon, 1902) was an English professional footballer. He played for Gillingham between 1924 and 1926, making seven appearances in the Football League.
