= Jackie Whitehouse =

English footballer

Personal information
- Full name: John Charles Whitehouse
- Date of birth: 4 March 1897
- Place of birth: Smethwick, England
- Date of death: 1 March 1948 (aged 50)
- Place of death: Halesowen, England
- Height: 5 ft 7 in (1.70 m)
- Position: Forward

Senior career*
Years	Team	Apps	(Gls)
- Blackheath Town
1915–1916	Redditch		
1916–1923	Birmingham	110	(31)
1923–1929	Derby County	186	(82)
1929–1930	Sheffield Wednesday	10	(1)
1930–1933	Bournemouth & Boscombe Athletic	105	(17)
1933–1934	Folkestone Town		
1934–1935	Worcester City		

Managerial career
- 1934–1935: Worcester City (player-manager)
- * Club domestic league appearances and goals

John Charles Whitehouse (4 March 1897 – 1 March 1948) was an English professional footballer who played as a forward. He made more than 400 appearances in the Football League for Birmingham, Derby County, Sheffield Wednesday and Bournemouth & Boscombe Athletic.

== Playing career ==
Whitehouse was born in Smethwick, Staffordshire. He signed for Birmingham from Redditch in 1916, and scored 48 goals in 87 games for the club in three seasons of wartime competition. He was one of many local players given a first team opportunity during the First World War at a younger age than would have been the case if regular players had not been away on military service. He was a combative forward who scored goals for Birmingham at a rate of about one every three games, which helped them win the championship of the Second Division in 1920–21.

He moved to Derby County in 1923, and formed a prolific partnership with Harry Storer and Randolph Galloway. He missed the last two games of the 1923–24 season with injury, otherwise he would have been ever-present, and Derby missed promotion to the First Division on goal average by one goal. When two years later Derby were promoted, Whitehouse was equally at home in the top flight, scoring 47 goals in less than three seasons. In a six-year career at Derby he made exactly 200 appearances, scoring 86 goals at a rate of nearly a goal every two games.

In February 1929 he moved to Sheffield Wednesday. The club won two successive league championships in 1928–29 and 1929–30, but Whitehouse's contribution was small. He failed to settle, and played only ten games in all. He then spent three seasons with Bournemouth & Boscombe Athletic, playing more than 100 times for the club in the Third Division South. He then moved into non-League football with Folkestone Town and spent a further year as player-manager of Worcester City. He later scouted for Derby County.

Whitehouse died in 1948 in Halesowen, Worcestershire, at the age of 50.

== Sources ==
- Matthews, Tony (1995). Birmingham City: A Complete Record. Derby: Breedon Books. ISBN 978-1-85983-010-9.
- Matthews, Tony (2000). The Encyclopedia of Birmingham City Football Club 1875–2000. Cradley Heath: Britespot. ISBN 978-0-9539288-0-4.
