= Grays Thurrock United F.C. =

- Full name: Grays Thurrock United Football Club
- Founded: 1924
- Dissolved: c. 1932
- Ground: The Lawn, Little Thurrock (1924–1925); Recreation Ground (1925–1929); The Lawn, Little Thurrock (1929–)

Grays Thurrock United Football Club were an association football club from Grays, Essex, England.

They were formed in 1924 to represent transport workers of the area, and had initially been formed as Grays Transport Football Club, but this was changed before the start of the 1924–25 season due to objection from other clubs. Grays Thurrock competed in the Kent League during their initial season and played at the Lawn in Little Thurrock. They ended the season fifth in the Kent League and were semi-finalists in the Kent Senior Cup. They drew crowds of up to 5,000 spectators.

The club were accepted into the Southern League for the 1925–26 season, but due to their failure to withdraw from the Kent League, they played in both competitions. Although they had spent over £350 on work to their ground, they made the decision to instead groundshare with Grays Athletic at the Recreation Ground. Their secretary-manager was Arthur Johnson, a local man who had played in the Football League for Sheffield United. Frank Burton, a former West Ham United and Charlton Athletic player, was recruited as player-trainer, along with goalkeeper Freddy Wood, a teammate at Charlton. Jimmy Pipe of Millwall, Harry White, who had played for Southend United, and Charles Orford of Gillingham, were also signed.

In April 1926, the club sold Jack Page to Millwall for the highest fee received for a Kent League player. In June 1929, the club appointed former player Harry White as manager. In August of that year, they returned to their original ground at the Lawn.

The club resigned from the Southern League in 1930. They appeared in FA Cup preliminary competition in September of that year, and continued to play in the Kent League until 1931–32, ending that season 11th in Division One.
