= 1923–24 Football League =

32nd season of the Football League

The Football League
- Season: 1923–24
- Champions: Huddersfield Town
- New Teams in League: Bournemouth & Boscombe Athletic; Doncaster Rovers; New Brighton

The 1923–24 season was the 32nd season of The Football League. It began on 25 August 1923 and ended on 3 May 1924.

== Final league tables ==
The tables and results below are reproduced here in the exact form that they can be found at The Rec.Sport.Soccer Statistics Foundation website and in Rothmans Book of Football League Records 1888–89 to 1978–79, with home and away statistics separated.

Beginning with the season 1894–95, clubs finishing level on points were separated according to goal average (goals scored divided by goals conceded), or more properly put, goal ratio. In case one or more teams had the same goal difference, this system favoured those teams who had scored fewer goals. The goal average system was eventually scrapped beginning with the 1976–77 season. From the 1922–23 season on, re-election was required of the bottom two teams of both Third Division North and Third Division South.

== First Division ==
First Division
- Season: 1923–24
- Champions: Huddersfield Town; 1st English title
- Relegated: Chelsea; Middlesbrough
- Matches: 462
- Goals: 1,143 (2.47 per match)
- Top goalscorer: Wilf Chadwick (28 goals)
- Biggest home win: Bolton Wanderers 7–1 Notts County (15 December 1923)
- Biggest away win: Chelsea 0–6 Notts County (9 February 1924)
- Highest scoring: Bolton Wanderers 7–1 Notts County (15 December 1923); Sheffield United 6–2 Tottenham Hotspur (8 March 1924); Liverpool 6–2 Birmingham (29 April 1924)

Pos	Team	Pld	W	D	L	GF	GA	GAv	Pts	Relegation
1	Huddersfield Town (C)	42	23	11	8	60	33	1.818	57	
2	Cardiff City	42	22	13	7	61	34	1.794	57	
3	Sunderland	42	22	9	11	71	54	1.315	53	
4	Bolton Wanderers	42	18	14	10	68	34	2.000	50	
5	Sheffield United	42	19	12	11	69	49	1.408	50	
6	Aston Villa	42	18	13	11	52	37	1.405	49	
7	Everton	42	18	13	11	62	53	1.170	49	
8	Blackburn Rovers	42	17	11	14	54	50	1.080	45	
9	Newcastle United	42	17	10	15	60	54	1.111	44	
10	Notts County	42	14	14	14	44	49	0.898	42	
11	Manchester City	42	15	12	15	54	71	0.761	42	
12	Liverpool	42	15	11	16	49	48	1.021	41	
13	West Ham United	42	13	15	14	40	43	0.930	41	
14	Birmingham	42	13	13	16	41	49	0.837	39	
15	Tottenham Hotspur	42	12	14	16	50	56	0.893	38	
16	West Bromwich Albion	42	12	14	16	51	62	0.823	38	
17	Burnley	42	12	12	18	55	60	0.917	36	
18	Preston North End	42	12	10	20	52	67	0.776	34	
19	Arsenal	42	12	9	21	40	63	0.635	33	
20	Nottingham Forest	42	10	12	20	42	64	0.656	32	
21	Chelsea (R)	42	9	14	19	31	53	0.585	32	Relegation to the Second Division
22	Middlesbrough (R)	42	7	8	27	37	60	0.617	22	Relegation to the Second Division

Source: World Football
Rules for classification: 1) Points; 2) Goal average; 3) Goals scored
(C) Champions; (R) Relegated

=== Results ===
Home \ Away	ARS	AST	BIR	BLB	BOL	BUR	CAR	CHE	EVE	HUD	LIV	MCI	MID	NEW	NOT	NTC	PNE	SHU	SUN	TOT	WBA	WHU
Arsenal		0–1	0–0	2–2	0–0	2–0	1–2	1–0	0–1	1–3	3–1	1–2	2–1	1–4	1–0	0–0	1–2	1–3	2–0	1–1	1–0	4–1
Aston Villa	2–1		0–0	1–0	1–0	1–1	2–1	0–0	1–1	3–1	0–0	2–0	0–0	6–1	2–0	0–0	5–1	2–2	0–1	0–0	4–0	1–1
Birmingham	0–2	3–0		1–1	0–3	2–1	0–0	1–0	0–1	0–1	2–1	3–0	2–1	4–1	0–2	0–0	2–0	0–1	0–2	3–2	0–0	2–0
Blackburn Rovers	2–0	3–1	4–1		3–1	1–1	2–1	3–0	2–0	1–0	0–0	0–1	2–0	2–1	1–1	4–1	2–0	1–1	3–2	0–1	4–0	0–0
Bolton Wanderers	1–2	1–0	1–1	3–0		0–0	2–2	4–0	2–0	3–1	4–1	0–0	2–0	0–1	4–0	7–1	0–0	4–2	1–0	3–1	2–0	1–1
Burnley	4–1	1–2	1–2	1–2	1–0		1–2	2–0	2–2	1–1	2–0	3–2	0–0	3–2	2–4	1–1	1–0	2–0	0–3	2–2	4–0	5–1
Cardiff City	4–0	0–2	2–0	2–0	3–2	2–0		1–1	0–0	0–0	2–0	1–1	1–0	1–0	4–1	0–2	1–1	3–1	2–1	2–1	3–0	1–0
Chelsea	0–0	0–0	1–1	2–0	0–0	3–2	1–2		1–1	0–1	2–1	3–1	2–0	1–0	1–1	0–6	1–2	1–1	4–1	0–1	0–0	0–0
Everton	3–1	2–0	2–0	0–0	2–2	3–3	0–0	2–0		1–1	1–0	6–1	1–0	2–2	2–1	3–0	1–1	2–0	2–3	4–2	2–0	2–1
Huddersfield Town	6–1	1–0	1–0	1–0	1–0	1–0	2–0	0–1	2–0		3–1	1–1	1–0	1–1	3–0	0–0	4–0	1–0	3–2	2–1	0–0	1–1
Liverpool	0–0	0–1	6–2	0–0	3–1	1–0	0–2	3–1	1–2	1–1		0–0	3–1	0–1	4–2	1–0	3–1	2–3	4–2	1–0	0–0	2–0
Manchester City	1–0	1–2	1–0	3–1	1–1	2–2	1–1	1–0	2–1	1–1	0–1		3–2	1–1	1–3	1–0	2–2	2–1	4–1	1–0	3–3	2–1
Middlesbrough	0–0	0–2	0–1	2–0	1–2	3–0	0–1	2–0	1–1	2–0	1–1	1–1		1–0	5–2	2–3	1–2	0–1	1–3	0–1	0–1	0–1
Newcastle United	1–0	4–1	2–1	2–1	1–0	2–0	1–1	2–1	3–1	0–1	2–1	4–1	3–2		4–0	1–2	3–1	2–2	0–2	2–2	1–1	0–0
Nottingham Forest	2–1	0–0	1–1	0–0	1–0	0–0	0–1	2–0	1–0	1–1	0–1	1–2	3–1	0–0		1–0	1–1	1–2	1–2	0–0	1–1	2–1
Notts County	1–2	0–1	1–1	3–0	1–1	2–1	1–0	0–0	1–1	1–0	1–2	2–0	1–0	1–0	2–1		0–0	0–2	1–2	0–0	1–0	1–1
Preston North End	0–2	2–2	1–0	0–1	0–2	5–0	3–1	1–1	0–1	1–3	0–1	4–1	4–0	1–2	3–1	2–1		1–1	1–2	2–2	1–2	2–1
Sheffield United	3–1	2–1	0–2	4–0	0–0	2–1	1–1	1–0	4–0	0–1	1–1	3–0	0–1	2–1	0–0	3–1	4–0		1–1	6–2	2–0	0–2
Sunderland	1–1	2–0	1–1	5–1	2–2	0–1	0–3	2–0	3–0	2–1	0–0	5–2	3–2	3–2	1–0	1–1	2–1	2–2		1–0	2–0	0–0
Tottenham Hotspur	3–0	2–3	1–1	2–1	0–0	1–0	1–1	0–1	2–5	1–0	1–1	4–1	2–1	2–0	3–0	1–3	2–0	1–2	1–1		0–0	0–1
West Bromwich Albion	4–0	1–0	0–0	3–3	0–5	0–3	2–4	2–2	5–0	2–4	2–0	2–1	1–1	0–0	3–2	5–0	1–2	3–1	3–1	4–1		0–0
West Ham United	1–0	1–0	4–1	0–1	0–1	0–0	0–0	2–0	2–1	2–3	1–0	1–2	1–1	1–0	3–2	1–1	3–1	2–2	0–1	0–0	1–0	

Legend: Blue = home team win; Yellow = draw; Red = away team win.

=== Maps ===
Locations of the Football League First Division teams
Locations of the Football League First Division London teams

== Second Division ==
Football League Second Division
- Season: 1923–24
- Champions: Leeds United (1st title)
- Relegated: Bristol City; Nelson
- Matches: 462
- Goals: 1,125 (2.44 per match)
- Top goalscorer: Harry Bedford (Blackpool), 34
- Biggest home win: Blackpool – Port Vale 6–1 (22 Mar 1923)
- Biggest away win: Bristol City – Derby County 0–8 (29 Sept 1923)
- Highest scoring: Bristol City – Derby County 0–8 (29 Sept 1923)

Pos	Team	Pld	W	D	L	GF	GA	GAv	Pts	Promotion or relegation
1	Leeds United (C, P)	42	21	12	9	61	35	1.743	54	Promotion to the First Division
2	Bury (P)	42	21	9	12	63	35	1.800	51	Promotion to the First Division
3	Derby County	42	21	9	12	75	42	1.786	51	
4	Blackpool	42	18	13	11	72	47	1.532	49	
5	Southampton	42	17	14	11	52	31	1.677	48	
6	Stoke	42	14	18	10	44	42	1.048	46	
7	Oldham Athletic	42	14	17	11	45	52	0.865	45	
8	The Wednesday	42	16	12	14	54	51	1.059	44	
9	South Shields	42	17	10	15	49	50	0.980	44	
10	Clapton Orient	42	14	15	13	40	36	1.111	43	
11	Barnsley	42	16	11	15	57	61	0.934	43	
12	Leicester City	42	17	8	17	64	54	1.185	42	
13	Stockport County	42	13	16	13	44	52	0.846	42	
14	Manchester United	42	13	14	15	52	44	1.182	40	
15	Crystal Palace	42	13	13	16	53	65	0.815	39	
16	Port Vale	42	13	12	17	50	66	0.758	38	
17	Hull City	42	10	17	15	46	51	0.902	37	
18	Bradford City	42	11	15	16	35	48	0.729	37	
19	Coventry City	42	11	13	18	52	68	0.765	35	
20	Fulham	42	10	14	18	45	56	0.804	34	
21	Nelson (R)	42	10	13	19	40	74	0.541	33	Relegation to the Third Division North
22	Bristol City (R)	42	7	15	20	32	65	0.492	29	Relegation to the Third Division South

(C) Champions; (P) Promoted; (R) Relegated

=== Results ===
Home \ Away	BAR	BLP	BRA	BRI	BRY	CLA	COV	CRY	DER	FUL	HUL	LEE	LEI	MUN	NEL	OLD	PTV	SOU	SSH	STP	STK	WED
Barnsley		3–1	2–1	3–1	2–0	1–0	1–1	5–2	1–3	2–1	0–0	1–3	3–1	1–0	0–0	4–1	3–0	1–1	1–0	0–0	0–0	0–0
Blackpool	0–2		2–1	2–0	3–1	3–0	5–0	2–0	4–0	3–0	0–0	1–1	3–1	1–0	1–1	2–2	6–1	2–0	1–1	0–0	1–1	1–0
Bradford City	3–2	0–2		1–1	2–2	0–0	0–0	0–1	1–2	1–0	2–1	0–0	2–2	0–0	0–2	2–1	2–0	2–1	0–1	0–1	2–1	4–1
Bristol City	1–1	1–1	0–1		4–1	0–2	2–2	0–0	0–8	0–1	1–0	0–1	0–1	1–2	1–0	0–0	0–0	1–1	1–0	3–0	1–1	2–3
Bury	1–1	2–0	3–0	6–0		0–0	5–0	1–1	1–0	2–1	1–0	3–0	2–0	2–0	2–0	2–2	0–0	1–0	0–1	2–1	1–0	5–0
Clapton Orient	2–1	1–0	1–1	2–0	1–0		4–0	1–0	2–0	0–0	0–0	0–1	1–0	1–0	5–1	1–2	1–1	0–0	3–0	1–1	0–2	0–0
Coventry City	2–3	3–1	1–0	1–1	1–0	1–1		0–0	0–1	3–0	0–2	2–1	2–4	1–1	4–0	5–2	1–3	0–0	1–0	0–0	1–2	5–1
Crystal Palace	3–1	3–1	3–0	1–0	1–0	2–1	3–1		0–1	1–1	0–0	1–1	4–3	1–1	1–1	2–3	1–2	0–0	1–0	1–1	5–1	3–0
Derby County	2–1	2–0	0–0	2–3	0–2	1–0	1–0	5–0		3–3	4–1	2–0	4–0	3–0	6–0	2–1	2–0	1–0	6–1	4–1	1–1	1–1
Fulham	3–0	2–3	1–1	1–1	0–2	0–0	1–1	1–0	3–2		1–1	0–2	1–0	3–1	0–0	0–0	0–0	3–2	2–3	1–0	3–0	4–1
Hull City	1–2	2–1	2–0	5–0	0–1	2–2	3–2	2–2	0–1	4–2		1–2	1–1	1–1	2–1	0–0	1–2	0–0	1–0	1–2	2–0	1–1
Leeds United	3–1	0–0	1–0	0–0	1–2	1–0	3–1	3–0	1–1	3–0	5–2		1–2	0–0	1–0	5–0	3–0	3–0	2–1	4–0	0–0	1–0
Leicester City	2–0	1–2	0–1	5–1	3–0	1–2	2–0	1–0	3–0	2–1	1–1	2–0		2–2	3–1	1–1	2–0	0–1	4–1	1–1	5–0	2–1
Manchester United	1–2	0–0	3–0	2–1	0–1	2–2	1–2	5–1	0–0	0–0	1–1	3–1	3–0		0–1	2–0	5–0	1–0	1–1	3–0	2–2	2–0
Nelson	4–3	2–3	1–1	2–1	0–5	1–1	3–0	4–2	2–1	1–1	1–1	3–1	1–1	0–2		2–1	1–3	0–0	0–2	1–1	2–0	1–1
Oldham Athletic	1–1	1–1	0–0	0–0	0–0	1–0	1–1	1–0	2–0	2–1	0–0	2–2	0–0	3–2	1–0		2–0	1–3	1–0	3–1	0–0	2–0
Port Vale	4–1	2–6	2–2	0–2	2–1	1–0	1–1	3–4	2–0	3–1	2–2	0–1	2–1	0–1	0–0	3–0		1–0	1–1	0–1	2–4	2–0
Southampton	6–0	3–2	2–0	1–0	3–0	5–0	1–3	1–0	0–0	1–0	2–0	0–1	1–0	0–0	3–0	3–1	1–1		0–0	0–0	0–1	3–0
South Shields	2–0	1–0	0–0	1–1	1–0	1–1	4–2	2–0	3–2	1–0	0–1	2–0	1–2	1–0	3–0	2–0	3–3	1–2		3–1	1–0	1–1
Stockport County	1–1	2–1	1–2	0–0	3–2	2–0	0–0	2–2	0–0	2–1	5–1	1–1	3–1	3–2	1–0	0–1	0–0	2–3	3–2		0–1	1–0
Stoke	2–0	2–2	2–0	3–0	0–0	0–1	2–1	1–1	1–1	0–0	1–0	1–1	1–0	3–0	4–0	1–1	1–0	1–1	0–0	0–0		1–1
The Wednesday	1–0	2–2	0–0	1–0	1–1	1–0	2–0	6–0	1–0	2–1	1–0	0–0	2–1	2–0	5–0	1–2	2–1	1–1	5–0	3–0	3–0	

Source: Ian Laschke: Rothmans Book of Football League Records 1888–89 to 1978–79. Macdonald and Jane’s, London & Sydney, 1980.
Legend: Blue = home team win; Yellow = draw; Red = away team win.

=== Maps ===
Locations of the Football League Second Division teams
Locations of the Football League Second Division London teams

== Third Division North ==
Football League Third Division North
- Season: 1923–24
- Champions: Wolverhampton Wanderers (1st title)
- Failed re-election: None
- Matches: 462
- Goals: 1,150 (2.49 per match)
- Top goalscorer: David Brown (Darlington), 27

Pos	Team	Pld	W	D	L	GF	GA	GAv	Pts	Promotion
1	Wolverhampton Wanderers (C, P)	42	24	15	3	76	27	2.815	63	Promotion to the Second Division
2	Rochdale	42	25	12	5	60	26	2.308	62	
3	Chesterfield	42	22	10	10	70	39	1.795	54	
4	Rotherham County	42	23	6	13	70	43	1.628	52	
5	Bradford (Park Avenue)	42	21	10	11	69	43	1.605	52	
6	Darlington	42	20	8	14	70	53	1.321	48	
7	Southport	42	16	14	12	44	42	1.048	46	
8	Ashington	42	18	8	16	59	61	0.967	44	
9	Doncaster Rovers	42	15	12	15	59	53	1.113	42	
10	Wigan Borough	42	14	14	14	55	53	1.038	42	
11	Grimsby Town	42	14	13	15	49	47	1.043	41	
12	Tranmere Rovers	42	13	15	14	51	60	0.850	41	
13	Accrington Stanley	42	16	8	18	48	61	0.787	40	
14	Halifax Town	42	15	10	17	42	59	0.712	40	
15	Durham City	42	15	9	18	59	60	0.983	39	
16	Wrexham	42	10	18	14	37	44	0.841	38	
17	Walsall	42	14	8	20	44	59	0.746	36	
18	New Brighton	42	11	13	18	40	53	0.755	35	
19	Lincoln City	42	10	12	20	48	59	0.814	32	
20	Crewe Alexandra	42	7	13	22	32	58	0.552	27	
21	Hartlepools United	42	7	11	24	33	70	0.471	25	Re-elected
22	Barrow	42	8	9	25	35	80	0.438	25	Re-elected

Source: rsssf.com
(C) Champions; (P) Promoted

=== Results ===
Home \ Away	ACC	ASH	BRW	BPA	CHF	CRE	DAR	DON	DUR	GRI	HAL	HAR	LIN	NWB	ROC	ROT	SOU	TRA	WAL	WIG	WOL	WRE
Accrington Stanley		0–1	3–1	2–2	2–0	1–1	2–0	0–0	5–4	2–0	1–2	2–0	3–1	0–0	0–1	3–2	2–0	3–1	0–3	2–2	1–0	1–0
Ashington	1–1		2–0	1–0	1–1	3–0	2–1	3–1	2–1	1–0	4–0	0–0	2–1	5–0	1–0	1–2	2–0	3–3	3–1	3–0	1–7	0–2
Barrow	0–0	2–2		1–1	2–0	1–2	1–0	0–0	1–2	3–1	1–0	1–2	2–1	2–1	1–2	1–2	1–3	1–1	0–1	2–1	2–2	0–0
Bradford Park Avenue	1–1	3–1	3–0		2–1	1–1	1–0	4–2	3–0	2–1	1–0	4–0	3–1	1–1	4–2	2–0	2–0	2–0	5–0	4–0	0–1	2–0
Chesterfield	3–0	2–0	2–1	2–3		2–1	5–1	2–1	1–1	4–2	1–1	5–1	2–1	1–0	1–1	3–1	4–0	5–0	7–0	1–0	0–0	1–0
Crewe Alexandra	1–2	1–3	2–0	1–1	0–1		2–1	0–2	0–2	0–0	2–2	2–1	1–2	2–0	0–2	1–0	1–1	1–1	2–0	0–2	0–0	1–1
Darlington	2–1	3–2	5–1	3–1	2–1	1–1		1–1	3–2	1–0	0–0	5–0	1–0	3–1	2–2	1–0	3–1	4–1	4–2	3–1	1–1	3–0
Doncaster Rovers	1–2	2–1	2–2	1–1	0–2	4–1	1–0		2–1	2–1	7–0	3–1	3–2	2–0	0–0	0–1	3–0	4–0	3–0	0–0	0–2	1–0
Durham City	3–0	4–0	1–2	2–0	1–1	3–1	3–2	2–1		0–1	2–2	3–0	1–0	2–1	0–0	3–2	0–1	1–1	1–0	2–2	2–3	4–3
Grimsby Town	2–0	4–0	5–0	2–0	0–0	2–0	3–0	1–1	1–0		1–1	0–1	2–2	0–0	1–0	1–1	1–0	0–0	1–0	1–1	2–0	0–0
Halifax Town	3–0	3–0	1–0	0–0	2–0	2–0	1–4	0–1	2–1	1–3		1–0	1–0	2–1	0–1	0–2	1–0	0–0	3–0	1–2	2–2	0–0
Hartlepools United	3–0	0–1	1–0	0–0	2–3	2–2	0–1	1–1	0–0	1–1	1–3		1–1	0–1	1–2	2–5	1–0	2–1	0–1	0–0	0–1	4–0
Lincoln City	0–2	2–0	4–1	2–3	0–1	0–0	2–0	1–1	3–1	1–3	1–1	1–1		1–0	0–2	2–1	1–1	1–1	2–0	1–1	0–0	4–2
New Brighton	1–2	1–1	5–0	1–0	0–0	2–1	1–1	2–0	2–0	0–0	2–0	0–0	3–1		1–1	1–2	0–0	0–0	1–0	5–0	0–1	0–0
Rochdale	4–1	1–0	3–1	3–0	3–0	1–0	0–0	2–0	2–0	4–2	3–0	1–0	1–0	6–2		1–0	2–2	1–0	1–0	1–0	0–0	0–0
Rotherham County	2–0	1–0	2–0	1–0	1–2	1–0	2–0	3–0	5–1	2–1	3–2	5–0	2–0	3–1	0–0		1–1	5–1	0–2	4–0	1–1	2–1
Southport	1–0	2–0	2–0	1–0	1–0	1–0	1–0	2–2	1–0	3–0	3–0	2–2	3–2	3–0	0–1	0–0		1–1	1–1	1–1	0–0	1–0
Tranmere Rovers	2–0	2–4	3–0	2–1	0–0	1–1	1–4	3–0	1–0	2–1	3–0	2–0	1–3	1–2	2–1	0–1	1–1		3–1	1–0	0–0	1–1
Walsall	2–0	1–1	1–1	2–3	0–1	1–0	2–1	5–2	1–1	2–0	2–0	2–0	0–0	3–0	0–1	1–1	0–1	0–4		3–0	2–1	1–2
Wigan Borough	2–0	1–1	4–0	0–1	3–1	3–0	2–2	1–0	0–1	4–0	0–1	4–1	0–0	1–0	3–0	3–1	1–1	1–2	2–1		1–1	3–1
Wolverhampton Wanderers	5–1	1–0	3–0	2–0	2–1	1–0	2–0	1–0	2–1	4–1	4–0	2–1	3–0	5–1	0–0	3–0	2–1	3–0	0–0	3–3		3–0
Wrexham	1–0	4–0	2–0	2–2	0–0	1–0	0–1	2–2	0–0	1–1	0–1	1–0	2–1	0–0	1–1	1–0	3–0	1–1	0–0	0–0	2–2	

Source: Ian Laschke: Rothmans Book of Football League Records 1888–89 to 1978–79. Macdonald and Jane’s, London & Sydney, 1980.
Legend: Blue = home team win; Yellow = draw; Red = away team win.

=== Maps ===
Locations of the Football League Third Division North teams

== Third Division South ==
Football League Third Division South
- Season: 1923–24
- Champions: Portsmouth (1st title)
- Failed re-election: None
- Matches: 462
- Goals: 1,177 (2.55 per match)
- Top goalscorer: Willie Haines (Portsmouth), 28

Pos	Team	Pld	W	D	L	GF	GA	GAv	Pts	Promotion
1	Portsmouth (C, P)	42	24	11	7	87	30	2.900	59	Promotion to the Second Division
2	Plymouth Argyle	42	23	9	10	70	34	2.059	55	
3	Millwall	42	22	10	10	64	38	1.684	54	
4	Swansea Town	42	22	8	12	60	48	1.250	52	
5	Brighton & Hove Albion	42	21	9	12	68	37	1.838	51	
6	Swindon Town	42	17	13	12	58	44	1.318	47	
7	Luton Town	42	16	14	12	50	44	1.136	46	
8	Northampton Town	42	17	11	14	64	47	1.362	45	
9	Bristol Rovers	42	15	13	14	52	46	1.130	43	
10	Newport County	42	17	9	16	56	64	0.875	43	
11	Norwich City	42	16	8	18	60	59	1.017	40	
12	Aberdare Athletic	42	12	14	16	45	58	0.776	38	
13	Merthyr Town	42	11	16	15	45	65	0.692	38	
14	Charlton Athletic	42	11	15	16	38	45	0.844	37	
15	Gillingham	42	12	13	17	43	58	0.741	37	
16	Exeter City	42	15	7	20	37	52	0.712	37	
17	Brentford	42	14	8	20	54	71	0.761	36	
18	Reading	42	13	9	20	51	57	0.895	35	
19	Southend United	42	12	10	20	53	84	0.631	34	
20	Watford	42	9	15	18	45	54	0.833	33	
21	Bournemouth & Boscombe Athletic	42	11	11	20	40	65	0.615	33	Re-elected
22	Queens Park Rangers	42	11	9	22	37	77	0.481	31	Re-elected

(C) Champions; (P) Promoted

=== Results ===
Home \ Away	ADE	B&BA	BRE	B&HA	BRR	CHA	EXE	GIL	LUT	MER	MIL	NPC	NOR	NWC	PLY	POR	QPR	REA	STD	SWA	SWI	WAT
Aberdare Athletic		1–0	1–2	3–1	2–0	4–1	0–0	1–1	0–1	0–0	1–1	2–0	2–2	0–0	1–2	0–0	1–1	1–0	5–2	4–2	2–2	4–0
Bournemouth & Boscombe Athletic	0–1		2–4	1–0	0–1	1–0	1–0	0–0	2–3	3–3	2–0	0–1	2–1	1–2	0–0	0–0	3–1	0–0	0–1	0–0	0–0	1–1
Brentford	1–1	2–0		1–2	1–2	0–0	1–0	3–2	2–1	0–0	1–3	0–0	1–0	3–0	1–1	1–1	0–1	4–1	3–1	2–2	2–2	4–1
Brighton & Hove Albion	5–0	5–0	2–0		2–1	3–0	1–0	2–2	4–0	0–0	2–2	4–0	2–0	3–0	4–1	0–4	3–0	4–0	2–0	4–1	1–1	3–0
Bristol Rovers	2–0	3–4	2–0	2–0		2–0	0–0	2–0	1–1	0–0	4–1	0–0	1–1	3–1	1–1	0–1	2–1	0–0	3–1	2–0	0–1	4–2
Charlton Athletic	3–1	1–2	3–1	0–2	1–3		1–0	0–0	1–1	1–0	0–1	2–1	0–0	0–0	0–1	1–1	3–0	0–0	4–1	1–3	3–1	1–1
Exeter City	1–1	0–2	1–0	0–1	3–1	0–0		2–1	2–1	1–0	2–0	5–0	2–1	1–2	0–4	0–0	3–0	3–2	2–0	1–0	3–1	1–0
Gillingham	3–1	1–0	6–0	1–1	1–0	0–1	1–1		0–0	2–1	0–2	2–1	1–1	3–1	1–0	0–2	0–0	1–0	3–2	0–1	1–0	0–0
Luton Town	1–0	6–2	2–1	0–0	0–0	0–1	1–0	1–1		1–1	2–0	2–0	1–1	2–1	0–2	4–1	2–0	2–0	4–4	1–2	3–2	0–0
Merthyr Town	0–0	4–2	2–0	2–1	1–1	2–1	3–0	0–2	0–0		1–0	3–3	0–0	2–3	1–0	2–2	2–0	1–1	3–2	0–0	2–0	2–1
Millwall	2–0	4–2	4–1	0–0	1–0	1–0	3–1	5–0	0–1	6–0		2–1	4–3	2–1	1–0	2–0	3–0	0–0	0–0	2–1	1–0	2–0
Newport County	0–0	2–0	3–2	0–0	1–0	0–1	2–0	2–1	1–0	4–4	2–1		1–1	1–0	1–2	2–1	2–1	2–0	5–0	4–1	3–0	1–0
Northampton Town	1–2	3–1	2–3	3–0	0–0	1–0	1–0	2–0	2–0	3–0	2–1	0–0		1–0	1–0	0–4	3–0	3–1	8–0	2–0	1–1	1–2
Norwich City	5–0	1–1	2–3	1–0	3–1	2–2	4–0	1–0	2–0	2–0	1–1	3–1	1–4		0–1	3–1	5–0	2–2	3–1	2–0	2–0	0–0
Plymouth Argyle	2–0	4–0	4–1	3–0	2–2	1–1	4–0	3–0	0–0	1–1	1–1	3–2	0–0	2–0		1–2	2–0	2–1	7–1	2–0	1–3	1–0
Portsmouth	4–0	3–0	3–0	1–3	1–1	0–0	4–0	3–0	3–0	1–0	0–1	5–0	1–3	4–0	2–1		7–0	1–1	3–0	3–0	4–1	4–0
Queens Park Rangers	3–0	0–1	1–0	1–0	1–2	0–0	2–0	1–1	0–2	3–0	1–1	0–3	3–2	2–1	3–2	0–2		1–4	0–0	2–2	2–2	2–1
Reading	0–1	1–2	1–0	0–1	3–2	3–1	1–0	4–0	0–1	3–0	2–0	1–1	1–0	3–0	1–2	1–4	4–0		1–0	3–4	1–0	1–1
Southend United	1–1	1–1	3–1	1–0	1–0	2–2	0–0	3–2	1–1	3–1	0–0	2–0	5–1	3–1	0–2	0–1	4–2	2–1		0–0	0–2	3–0
Swansea Town	1–0	1–0	4–0	1–0	3–1	1–0	1–0	3–1	1–0	5–1	1–2	2–1	2–1	1–0	1–0	0–0	2–0	5–1	2–1		1–1	1–0
Swindon Town	3–1	3–1	2–1	4–0	0–0	1–1	0–1	4–1	3–2	3–0	1–0	3–0	2–0	4–2	0–1	0–0	0–0	1–0	3–0	1–0		0–0
Watford	2–0	0–0	0–1	0–0	4–0	1–0	4–1	1–1	0–0	4–0	1–1	8–2	0–2	0–0	0–1	2–3	0–2	2–1	4–1	2–2	0–0	

Updated to match(es) played on unknown. Source: Ian Laschke: Rothmans Book of Football League Records 1888–89 to 1978–79. Macdonald and Jane’s, London & Sydney, 1980.
Legend: Blue = home team win; Yellow = draw; Red = away team win.

=== Maps ===
Locations of the Football League Third Division South teams
Locations of the Football League Third Division South London teams

== Attendances ==
=== Division One ===
No.	Club	Average
1	Chelsea FC	30,895
2	Arsenal FC	29,950
3	Everton FC	29,185
4	Tottenham Hotspur FC	28,420
5	Liverpool FC	28,390
6	Aston Villa FC	28,315
7	Manchester City FC	27,145
8	Cardiff City FC	26,920
9	Newcastle United FC	26,865
10	Sunderland AFC	23,475
11	Birmingham City FC	22,580
12	West Ham United FC	22,080
13	Sheffield United FC	21,740
14	Bolton Wanderers FC	20,290
15	Blackburn Rovers FC	18,520
16	West Bromwich Albion FC	18,290
17	Huddersfield Town AFC	17,395
18	Middlesbrough FC	17,285
19	Preston North End FC	16,300
20	Notts County FC	15,335
21	Burnley FC	14,890
22	Nottingham Forest FC	14,130

== See also ==
- 1923–24 in English football
- 1923 in association football
- 1924 in association football
