= 1924 in association football =

The following are the association football events of the year 1924 throughout the world.

== Events ==
- 24 October – English footballer Dixie Dean scores a hat-trick for Tranmere Rovers F.C. to become the youngest ever player to score three goals for The Superwhites.

=== Clubs formed in 1924 ===
- 7 August: Foundation of club Peruvian Universitario de Deportes and Colombian Junior de Barranquilla
- July: Foundation of Bulgarian FC Sportist Svoge

== Winners club national championship ==
- Belgium: Germinal Beerschot
- Denmark: B 1903
- England: Huddersfield Town
- Germany: 1. FC Nürnberg
- Greece: Regional Championships:

EPSA (Athens) Apollonas Athinon
EPSM (Thessaloniki) Aris
EPSP (Patras) Panachaiki

- Hungary: MTK Hungária
- Iceland: Víkingur
- Italy: Genoa 1893
- Kingdom of Serbs, Croats and Slovenes: SK Jugoslavija
- Netherlands: Feyenoord Rotterdam
- Poland: Championships did not take place due to preparations of national team to 1924 Paris, France Olympic Games
- Scotland: For fuller coverage, see 1923–24 in Scottish football.

Scottish Division One – Rangers
Scottish Cup – Airdrieonians

- Turkey: Harbiye Talimgah

== International tournaments ==
- 1924 British Home Championship (October 20, 1923 – April 12, 1924)

Wales

- Olympic Games in Paris, France (May 25 – June 9, 1924)
  1. Uruguay
  2. Switzerland
  3. Sweden
- 1924-28 Nordic Football Championship (June 15, 1924 – October 7, 1928) 1924: (June 15 – September 21, 1924)

Sweden (1924)
Denmark (1924–1928)

- South American Championship 1924 in Uruguay (October 12, 1924 – November 2, 1924)

Uruguay

== Births ==
- 17 February: Raimon Carrasco, Spanish businessman and 34th President of FC Barcelona (died 2022)
- 6 March: Ottmar Walter, German international footballer (died 2013)
- 13 March: Raúl Córdoba, Mexican international footballer (died 2017)
- 22 March: Bill Roost, English footballer (died 2013)
- 28 May: Johnny Carroll, Irish footballer (died 2001)
- 25 June: Dimitar Isakov, Bulgarian footballer
- 29 June: Dick Grieve, Scottish professional footballer (died 1997)

== Deaths ==
- November 20 – Ebenezer Cobb Morley, English sportsman, former FA president, regarded as the father of the FA and modern football. (93)
