= Daniel McGowan =

Daniel McGowan may refer to:

- Daniel A. McGowan, academic, and executive director of Deir Yassin Remembered
- Daniel G. McGowan (born 1974), environmental activist jailed and fined in 2006 for his involvement with Earth Liberation Front actions
- Danny McGowan (1924–1994), Irish footballer
- Daniel McGowan (kickboxer) (born 1996), British Muay Thai fighter
