= 1923–24 in English football =

Football in England
- Season: 1923–24

Men's football
- Football League: Huddersfield Town
- Football League Second Division: Leeds United
- FA Cup: Newcastle United

The 1923–24 season was the 49th season of competitive football in England, with Huddersfield Town becoming League Champions for the first time, managing to beat Cardiff City in the closest finish in the competition's history, having the same number of points and winning the title by just 0.024 on goal average.

== Overview ==
- On 11 November 1923, Aston Villa centre-half Tommy Ball was shot dead by his neighbour, thus becoming the only Football League player to have been murdered.

== Honours ==
Competition	Winner	Runner-up
First Division	Huddersfield Town (1)	Cardiff City
Second Division	Leeds United	Bury
Third Division North	Wolverhampton Wanderers	Rochdale
Third Division South	Portsmouth	Plymouth Argyle
FA Cup	Newcastle United (2)	Aston Villa
Charity Shield	Professionals XI	Amateurs XI
Home Championship	Wales	Scotland

== Football League ==
=== First Division ===
Pos	Team	Pld	W	D	L	GF	GA	GAv	Pts	Relegation
1	Huddersfield Town (C)	42	23	11	8	60	33	1.818	57	
2	Cardiff City	42	22	13	7	61	34	1.794	57	
3	Sunderland	42	22	9	11	71	54	1.315	53	
4	Bolton Wanderers	42	18	14	10	68	34	2.000	50	
5	Sheffield United	42	19	12	11	69	49	1.408	50	
6	Aston Villa	42	18	13	11	52	37	1.405	49	
7	Everton	42	18	13	11	62	53	1.170	49	
8	Blackburn Rovers	42	17	11	14	54	50	1.080	45	
9	Newcastle United	42	17	10	15	60	54	1.111	44	
10	Notts County	42	14	14	14	44	49	0.898	42	
11	Manchester City	42	15	12	15	54	71	0.761	42	
12	Liverpool	42	15	11	16	49	48	1.021	41	
13	West Ham United	42	13	15	14	40	43	0.930	41	
14	Birmingham	42	13	13	16	41	49	0.837	39	
15	Tottenham Hotspur	42	12	14	16	50	56	0.893	38	
16	West Bromwich Albion	42	12	14	16	51	62	0.823	38	
17	Burnley	42	12	12	18	55	60	0.917	36	
18	Preston North End	42	12	10	20	52	67	0.776	34	
19	Arsenal	42	12	9	21	40	63	0.635	33	
20	Nottingham Forest	42	10	12	20	42	64	0.656	32	
21	Chelsea (R)	42	9	14	19	31	53	0.585	32	Relegation to the Second Division
22	Middlesbrough (R)	42	7	8	27	37	60	0.617	22	Relegation to the Second Division

Source: World Football
Rules for classification: 1) Points; 2) Goal average; 3) Goals scored
(C) Champions; (R) Relegated

=== Second Division ===
Pos	Team	Pld	W	D	L	GF	GA	GAv	Pts	Promotion or relegation
1	Leeds United (C, P)	42	21	12	9	61	35	1.743	54	Promotion to the First Division
2	Bury (P)	42	21	9	12	63	35	1.800	51	Promotion to the First Division
3	Derby County	42	21	9	12	75	42	1.786	51	
4	Blackpool	42	18	13	11	72	47	1.532	49	
5	Southampton	42	17	14	11	52	31	1.677	48	
6	Stoke	42	14	18	10	44	42	1.048	46	
7	Oldham Athletic	42	14	17	11	45	52	0.865	45	
8	The Wednesday	42	16	12	14	54	51	1.059	44	
9	South Shields	42	17	10	15	49	50	0.980	44	
10	Clapton Orient	42	14	15	13	40	36	1.111	43	
11	Barnsley	42	16	11	15	57	61	0.934	43	
12	Leicester City	42	17	8	17	64	54	1.185	42	
13	Stockport County	42	13	16	13	44	52	0.846	42	
14	Manchester United	42	13	14	15	52	44	1.182	40	
15	Crystal Palace	42	13	13	16	53	65	0.815	39	
16	Port Vale	42	13	12	17	50	66	0.758	38	
17	Hull City	42	10	17	15	46	51	0.902	37	
18	Bradford City	42	11	15	16	35	48	0.729	37	
19	Coventry City	42	11	13	18	52	68	0.765	35	
20	Fulham	42	10	14	18	45	56	0.804	34	
21	Nelson (R)	42	10	13	19	40	74	0.541	33	Relegation to the Third Division North
22	Bristol City (R)	42	7	15	20	32	65	0.492	29	Relegation to the Third Division South

(C) Champions; (P) Promoted; (R) Relegated

=== Third Division North ===
Pos	Team	Pld	W	D	L	GF	GA	GAv	Pts	Promotion
1	Wolverhampton Wanderers (C, P)	42	24	15	3	76	27	2.815	63	Promotion to the Second Division
2	Rochdale	42	25	12	5	60	26	2.308	62	
3	Chesterfield	42	22	10	10	70	39	1.795	54	
4	Rotherham County	42	23	6	13	70	43	1.628	52	
5	Bradford (Park Avenue)	42	21	10	11	69	43	1.605	52	
6	Darlington	42	20	8	14	70	53	1.321	48	
7	Southport	42	16	14	12	44	42	1.048	46	
8	Ashington	42	18	8	16	59	61	0.967	44	
9	Doncaster Rovers	42	15	12	15	59	53	1.113	42	
10	Wigan Borough	42	14	14	14	55	53	1.038	42	
11	Grimsby Town	42	14	13	15	49	47	1.043	41	
12	Tranmere Rovers	42	13	15	14	51	60	0.850	41	
13	Accrington Stanley	42	16	8	18	48	61	0.787	40	
14	Halifax Town	42	15	10	17	42	59	0.712	40	
15	Durham City	42	15	9	18	59	60	0.983	39	
16	Wrexham	42	10	18	14	37	44	0.841	38	
17	Walsall	42	14	8	20	44	59	0.746	36	
18	New Brighton	42	11	13	18	40	53	0.755	35	
19	Lincoln City	42	10	12	20	48	59	0.814	32	
20	Crewe Alexandra	42	7	13	22	32	58	0.552	27	
21	Hartlepools United	42	7	11	24	33	70	0.471	25	Re-elected
22	Barrow	42	8	9	25	35	80	0.438	25	Re-elected

Source: rsssf.com
(C) Champions; (P) Promoted

=== Third Division South ===
Pos	Team	Pld	W	D	L	GF	GA	GAv	Pts	Promotion
1	Portsmouth (C, P)	42	24	11	7	87	30	2.900	59	Promotion to the Second Division
2	Plymouth Argyle	42	23	9	10	70	34	2.059	55	
3	Millwall	42	22	10	10	64	38	1.684	54	
4	Swansea Town	42	22	8	12	60	48	1.250	52	
5	Brighton & Hove Albion	42	21	9	12	68	37	1.838	51	
6	Swindon Town	42	17	13	12	58	44	1.318	47	
7	Luton Town	42	16	14	12	50	44	1.136	46	
8	Northampton Town	42	17	11	14	64	47	1.362	45	
9	Bristol Rovers	42	15	13	14	52	46	1.130	43	
10	Newport County	42	17	9	16	56	64	0.875	43	
11	Norwich City	42	16	8	18	60	59	1.017	40	
12	Aberdare Athletic	42	12	14	16	45	58	0.776	38	
13	Merthyr Town	42	11	16	15	45	65	0.692	38	
14	Charlton Athletic	42	11	15	16	38	45	0.844	37	
15	Gillingham	42	12	13	17	43	58	0.741	37	
16	Exeter City	42	15	7	20	37	52	0.712	37	
17	Brentford	42	14	8	20	54	71	0.761	36	
18	Reading	42	13	9	20	51	57	0.895	35	
19	Southend United	42	12	10	20	53	84	0.631	34	
20	Watford	42	9	15	18	45	54	0.833	33	
21	Bournemouth & Boscombe Athletic	42	11	11	20	40	65	0.615	33	Re-elected
22	Queens Park Rangers	42	11	9	22	37	77	0.481	31	Re-elected

(C) Champions; (P) Promoted

=== Top goalscorers ===
First Division

- Wilf Chadwick (Everton) – 28 goals

Second Division

- Harry Bedford (Blackpool) – 34 goals

Third Division North

- David Brown (Darlington) – 27 goals

Third Division South

- Willie Haines (Portsmouth) – 28 goals
