= Marc H. Ellis =

American scholar (1952–2024)

Marc Ellis
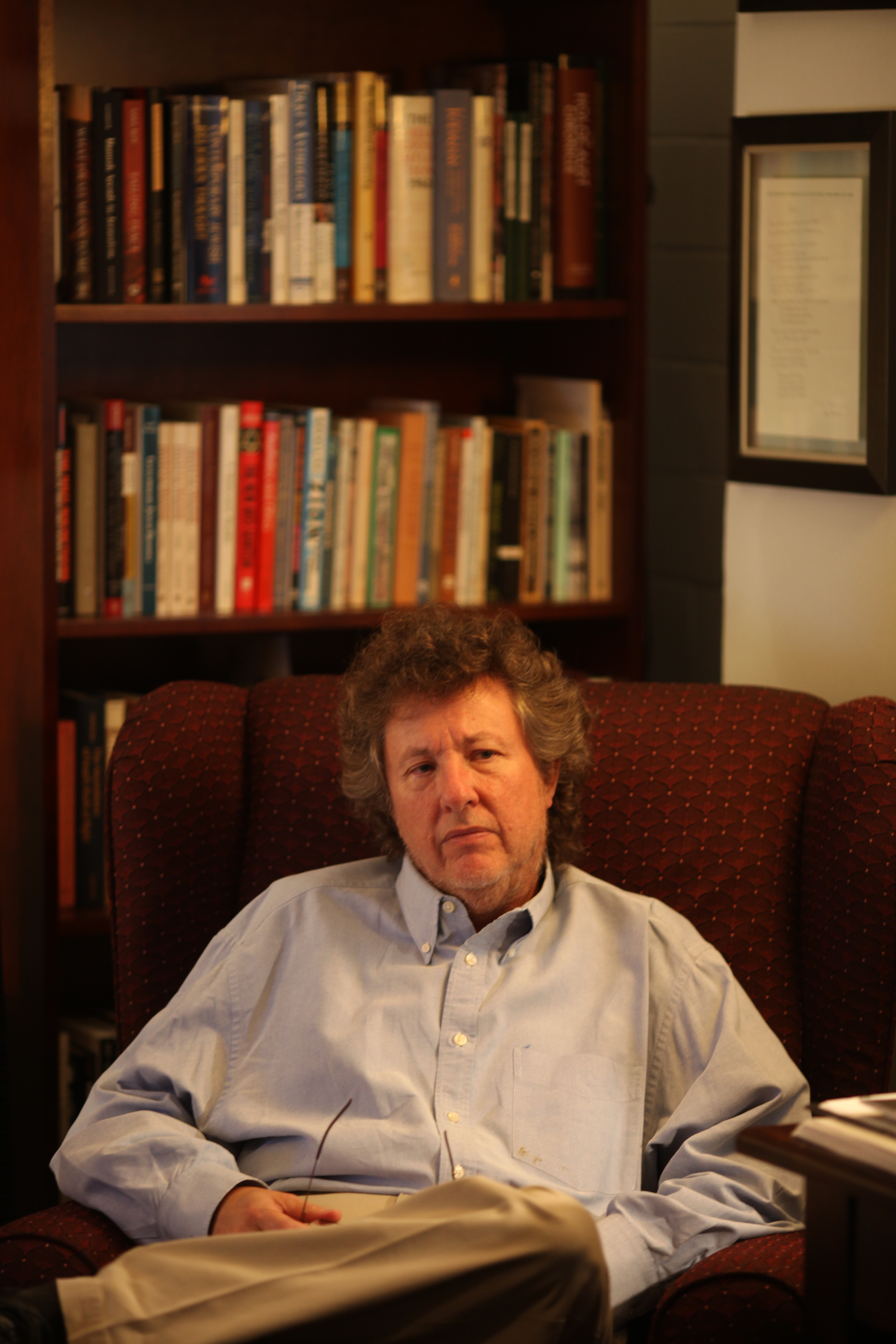
- Born: August 27, 1952; Miami, Florida, US
- Died: June 8, 2024 (aged 71)
- Education: B.A., University of Florida, 1974 M.A., University of Florida, 1976 Ph.D., Marquette University, 1980
- Occupation: Professor

Marc H. Ellis (August 27, 1952 – June 8, 2024) was an American author, liberation theologian, and a retired university professor of Jewish Studies, professor of history and director of the Center for Jewish Studies at Baylor University. He was a visiting professor of several international universities, including the University of Innsbruck, Austria and the United Nations University for Peace, Costa Rica.

== Biography ==
Ellis was Jewish and attended Orthodox and Conservative synagogues in his youth. Later in life, Ellis belonged to anti-Zionist synagogue Tzedek Chicago and befriended Rabbi Brant Rosen.

Ellis earned B.A. and M.A. degrees in Religion and American Studies at Florida State University, where he studied under Richard Rubenstein and Catholic Worker Movement historian William Miller. After meeting Dorothy Day at a gathering that Miller had arranged in 1974, he moved to New York and lived in St. Joseph House, a Catholic Worker house, for nine months; this experience became the basis for his 1976 master’s thesis and, subsequently, a 1978 book, A Year at the Catholic Worker.

In 1980 he received his doctorate in contemporary American Social and Religious Thought from Marquette University, where he again studied with William Miller. He then became a faculty member at the Maryknoll School of Theology in Maryknoll, New York, and director of the M.A. program at the Maryknoll Institute for Justice and Peace. He was made full professor in 1988, and remained at Maryknoll until 1995. He was a Senior Fellow and then visiting scholar at Harvard Divinity School's Center for the Study of World Religions and Harvard University's Center for Middle Eastern Studies, as well as a visiting professor at Florida State University.

=== Career at Baylor University ===
In 1998 he was appointed professor of American and Jewish studies at Baylor University, where the next year he was named university professor of American and Jewish Studies. In 1999 he founded Baylor University's Center for American and Jewish Studies. Early in his tenure at Baylor, the Houston Chronicle reported that the Jewish community in Waco, Texas, where Baylor is located, strongly criticized his appointment and his work, charging that Baylor had hired him as a “token Jew” to whitewash its history and that their excitement at news of his hire “quickly turned to disappointment as it became apparent ... that he was unabashedly pro-Palestinian and anti-Israel.” They further resented that he did not join either of the two synagogues in the community. In 2006, the Center was renamed The Center for Jewish Studies.

Ellis's 2012 departure from Baylor was controversial as he and his supporters, including Cornel West, Rosemary Ruether, and Desmond Tutu, stated that a concerted effort was made to remove him due to his views on Israeli-Palestinian relations. Baylor President Ken Starr and the university administration denied that Ellis was being targeted for his views but that the investigation had to do with privacy rules. Ellis responded that the privacy rules he was charged with violating were selectively enforced.

Ellis officially retired from Baylor University and later served as a visiting professor at international universities such as the United Nations-mandated University for Peace in Costa Rica and the University of Innsbruck, Austria.

== Work and ideas ==
Ellis's writings deal with contemporary Judaism, Jewish liberation theology, Jewish-Arab relations, justice, and peace. They are specifically concerned with Palestinian freedom, self-determination, and putting an end to Israeli occupation and war crimes. He believed that Jewish liberation could only be possible with Palestinian liberation.

Ellis's "Jewish prophetic" is a framework that he has described as both moral and religious, "with a political arc that bends toward justice and a profound sense of Jewish destiny. The Jewish prophetic is a deep encounter with the calling of Jewish history." Further, he argued that "the prophetic" tradition, rather than territory, is "the indigenous of Jewish history." Ellis also argued that "the Jewish tradition has this particular claim [to the prophetic] – originating and preserved in the Hebrew Bible" and at the foundation of diasporic Jewish life: "For Jews, the prophetic is local. It is the only reason to be Jewish."

Ellis considered Zionism responsible for what he called "Empire Judaism" or "Constantinian Judaism." He argued the Israeli oppression of Palestinians was to be analysed as a theological category.

Among those who have commented positively on the work of Ellis are George McGovern, Noam Chomsky, Edward Said, Professor Susannah Heschel, Elliot Dorff, Cornel West and Desmond Tutu.

In April 2018, the Perkins School of Theology in Dallas, Texas, held a Festschrift in Ellis's honor. The contributions to that event were published in a 2021 book, The New Diaspora and the Global Prophetic: Engaging the Scholarship of Marc H. Ellis.

== Later life and death ==
After a long illness, Ellis died on June 8, 2024 at the age of 71.

== Bibliography ==
- Ellis, M.H. (2023) First Light: Encountering Edward Said and the Late-Style Jewish Prophetic in the New Diaspora. ISBN 1957946105, 978-1957946108
- Ellis, M.H. (2021) I Am Who Loves the Prophets: An Exile Devotional. ISBN 1087951402, 978-1087951409
- Ellis, M.H. (2021) Traveling Jewish: Touring Lands of Dreams Deferred. ISBN 1087968704, 9781087968704
- Ellis, M.H. (2018) Finding Our Voice: Embodying the Prophetic and Other Misadventures. ISBN 153263093X, 978-1532630934
- Ellis, M.H. (2018) Jews of Conscience: Challenges and Choices (Religion in a Globalising World). ISBN 1532646933, 978-1532646935
- Ellis, M.H. (2017) Exile & the Prophetic: Images from the New Diaspora. ISBN 0986449431, 9780986449437
- Ellis, M.H. (2017) The Heartbeat of the Prophetic. ISBN 0996592407, 9780996592406
- Ellis, M.H. (2016) "Foreword" in Hamed, Adham (2016): Speaking the Unspeakable: Sounds of the Middle East Conflict. Wiesbaden, Verlag Springer.
- Ellis, M.H. (2016) The Renewal of Palestine in the Jewish Imagination. ISBN 1498296556, 9781498296557
- Ellis, M.H. (2016) Beyond innocence & Redemption: Confronting the Holocaust and Israeli power: Creating a Moral Future for the Jewish People. ISBN 1498294898, 9781498294898
- Ellis, M. H. (2014) Burning Children – A Jewish View of the War in Gaza. ISBN 0990760901, 9780990760900
- Ellis, M. H. (2011) Encountering the Jewish Future: with Wiesel, Buber, Heschel, Arendt, Levinas. Augsburg Fortress ISBN 978-0-8006-9793-8
- Ellis, M. H. (2009) Judaism Does Not Equal Israel: The Rebirth of the Jewish Prophetic. New Press ISBN 1-59558-425-0
- Ellis, M. H. (2007) Reading the Torah Out Loud: A Journey of Lament and Hope.
- Ellis, M. H. (2005) The End of Jewish History: Auschwitz, The Holocaust and Palestine. ISBN 0-7453-2426-6.
- Ellis, M. H. (2005) After Arafat: mapping a Jewish/Palestinian solidarity. ASIN B000AJQKUU.
- Ellis, M. H., & Neuberger, J.(preface) (2004) Toward a Jewish Theology of Liberation: The Challenge of the 21st Century. ISBN 1-932792-00-7
- Ellis, M. H. (2004) The Mural-Covered Wall: On Separation and the Future of Jews and Palestinians in Israel/Palestine and the Diaspora. ASIN B000BG5DE6.
- Ellis, M. H. (2003) At the end of an era: a meditation on ecumenism, exile and gratitude. ASIN B0008DMKHA.
- Ellis, M. H. (2002) Israel and Palestine – Out of the Ashes: The Search for Jewish Identity in the Twenty-first Century. ISBN 0-7453-1956-4
- Ellis, M. H. (2001) Practicing Exile: The Religious Odyssey of an American Jew. ISBN 0-8006-3443-8
- Ellis, M. H. (2000) Revolutionary Forgiveness: Essays on Judaism, Christianity, and the Future of religious Life. ISBN 0-918954-75-4
- Ellis, M. H.(2000) Indigenous minority rights, citizenship, and the new Jerusalem: a reflection on the future of Palestinians and Jews in the expanded state of Israel. ASIN B0008HBG4E.
- Ellis, M. H. (1999) O Jerusalem: The Contested Future of the Jewish Covenant. ISBN 0-8006-3159-5.
- McGowan, D., & Ellis, M. H. (1998) Remembering Deir Yassin: The Future of Israel and Palestine. ISBN 1-56656-291-0
- Ellis, M. H. (1997) Unholy Alliance: Religion and Atrocity in Our Time. ISBN 0-8006-3080-7
- Ellis, M. H. (1995) Restoring the ordinary: A reflection on the consciousness of the Holocaust in Jewish thought in the aftermath of the Israeli-Palestinian accords. ASIN B0006QR1E6.
- Ellis, M. H.(1994) Ending Auschwitz: The Future of Jewish and Christian Life. ISBN 0-664-25501-9
- Ellis, M. H. (1990) Beyond Innocence and redemption: Confronting the Holocaust and Israeli Power; Creating a Moral Future for the Jewish People. ISBN 0-06-062215-6
- Ellis, M. H. (1990) Expanding the View: Gustavo Gutierrez and the Future of Liberation Theology. ISBN 0-88344-690-1
- Ellis, M. H. (1989) The Future of Dissent: a Reflection on What Shall I Do With This People? Jews and the Fractious Politics of Judaism. ASIN B00082AJUG
- Ellis, M. H. (1987) Toward a Jewish Theology of Liberation Orbis Books, Maryknoll, New York, ISBN 0-88344-358-9
- Ellis, M. H. (1986) Faithfulness in an Age of Holocaust. ISBN 0-916349-13-6
- Ellis, M. H. (1981) Peter Maurin: Prophet in the twentieth century. ISBN 0-8091-2361-4
- Ellis, M.H. (1978, 2000) A Year at the Catholic Worker. ISBN 0809121409

== See also ==
- American philosophy
- List of American philosophers
- Supreme crime
