= Deir Yassin =

Deir Yassin دير ياسين Dayr Yasin
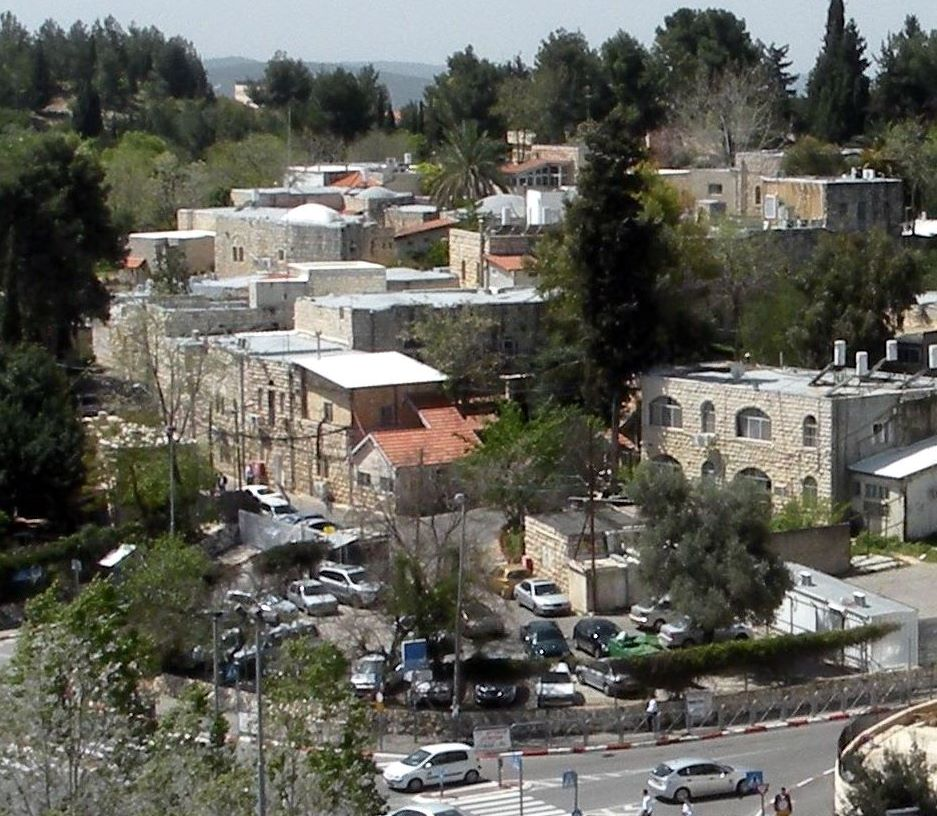
- Deir Yassin today, part of the Kfar Shaul Mental Health Center
- Etymology: "Monastery of [Sheikh] Yassin"
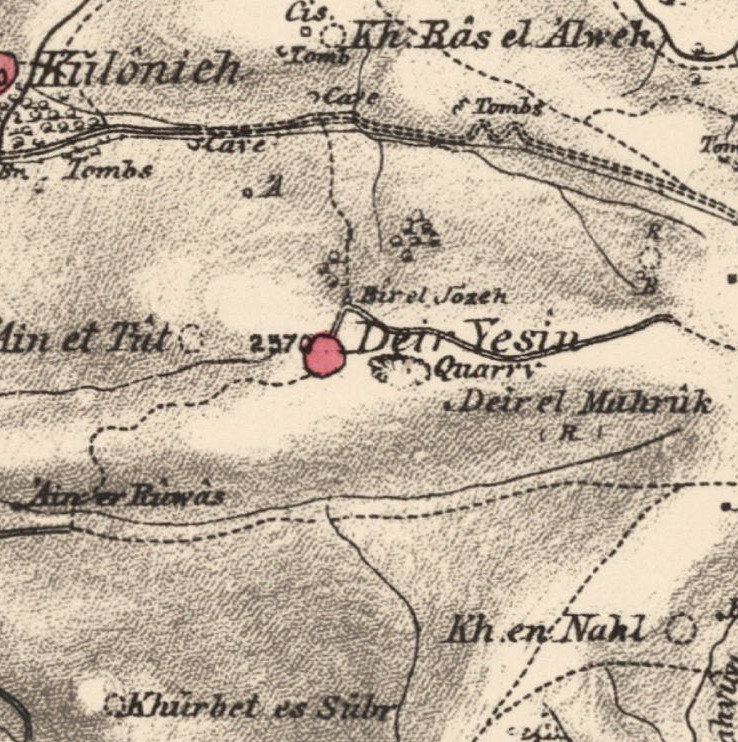
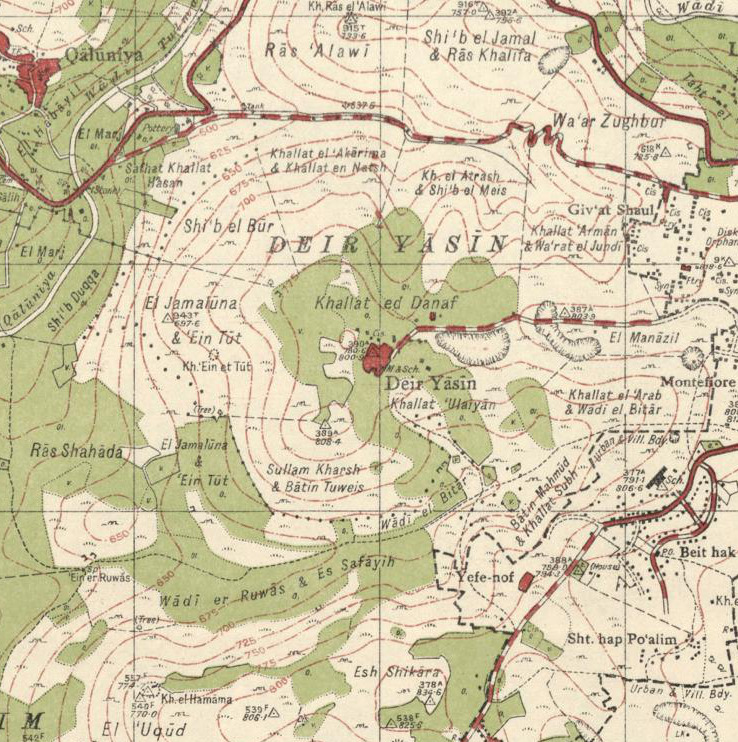
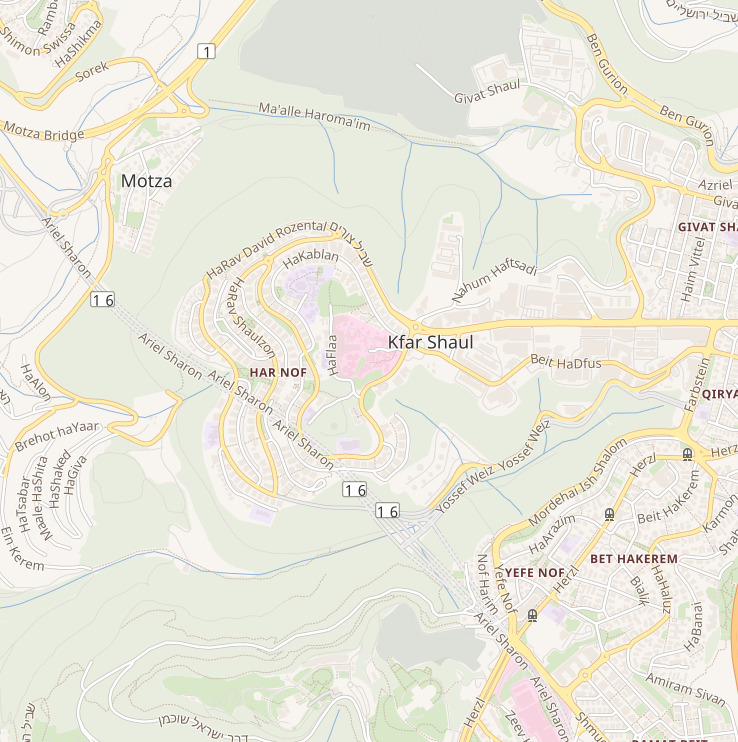
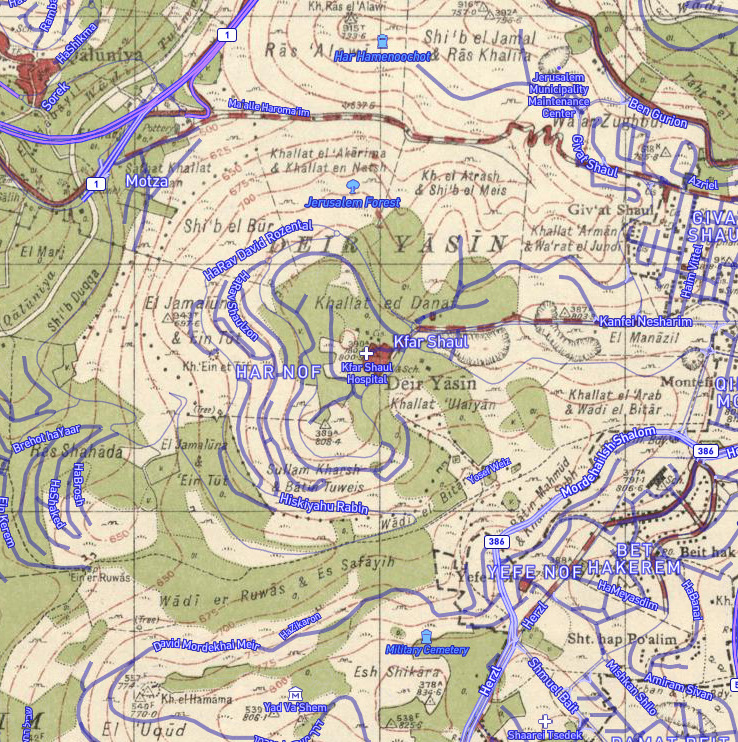
- 1870s map 1940s map modern map 1940s with modern overlay map A series of historical maps of the area around Deir Yassin (click the buttons)

- Location within Mandatory Palestine
- Coordinates: 31°47′9″N 35°10′41″E
- Palestine grid: 167/132
- Geopolitical entity: Mandatory Palestine
- Subdistrict: Jerusalem
- Date of depopulation: 9–10 April 1948

Area
  - Total: 2.6 km^{2} (1.0 sq mi)

Population (1945)
  - Total: 610
- Cause(s) of depopulation: Military assault by Yishuv forces
- Secondary cause: Expulsion by Yishuv forces
- Current Localities: Givat Shaul Beth and Har Nof neighborhoods of Jerusalem

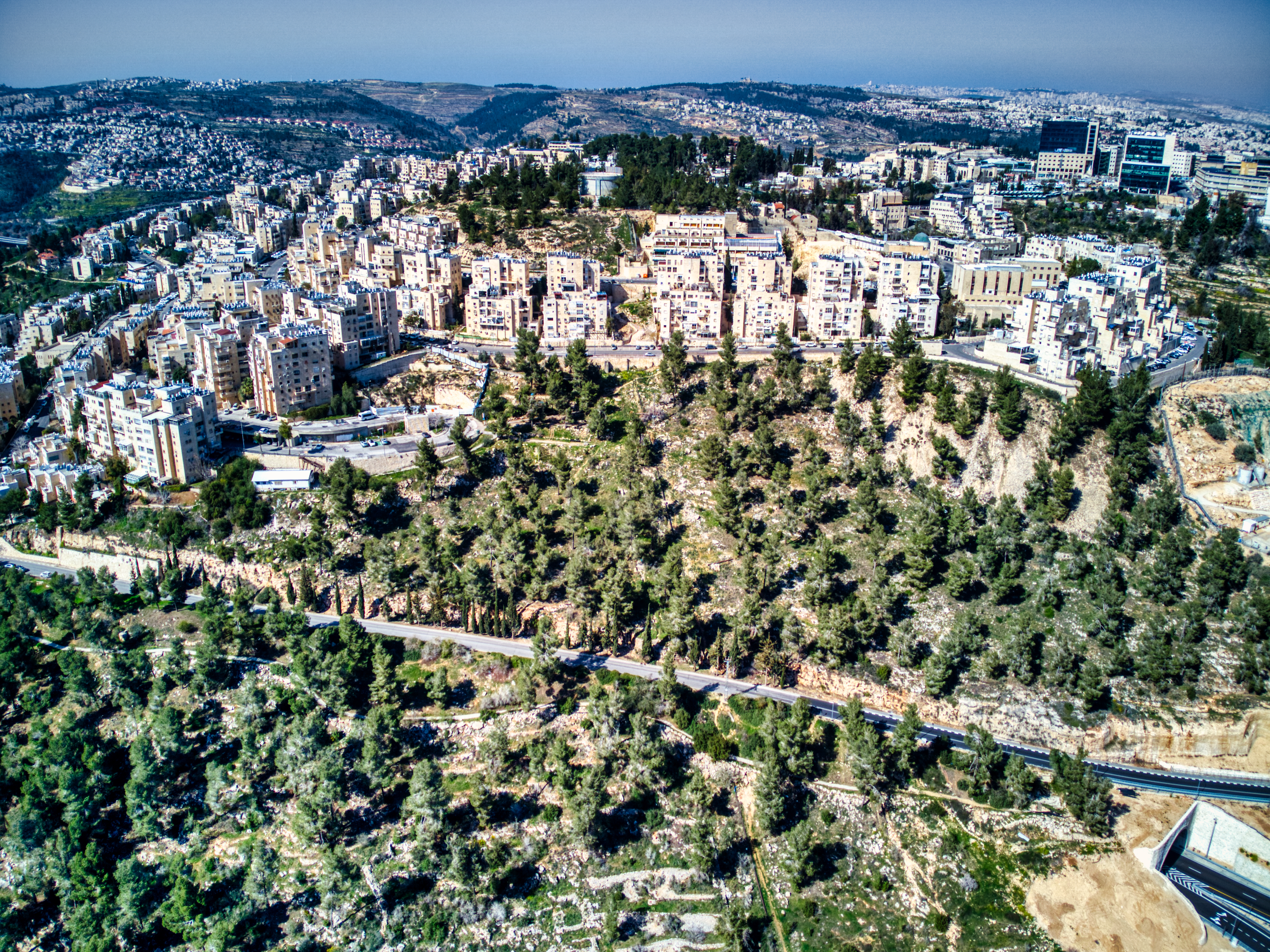
The hill of Deir Yassin, 2023

Deir Yassin (Arabic: دير ياسين, romanized: Dayr Yāsīn) was a Palestinian Arab village of around 600 inhabitants about 5 kilometers (3.1 mi) west of Jerusalem. During the 1948 Palestine war, the village was largely destroyed and its population expelled in the Deir Yassin massacre which killed around 107 of its residents on April 9, 1948. The attack on Deir Yassin was carried out by the Jewish paramilitary groups Irgun and Lehi, with support from the Haganah. In 1949 the village was resettled by Jewish Israelis, becoming part of Givat Shaul and the State of Israel. Some of Deir Yassin's former buildings are today part of the Kfar Shaul Mental Health Center, an Israeli public psychiatric hospital.

== Name ==
The first part of the village's name Deir is defined as "monastery" in Arabic. According to Palestinian historian Walid Khalidi, this was a common occurrence in Palestinian village names especially those so close to Jerusalem. A large ruin that lay at the southwestern edge of Deir Yassin was known simply as "Deir".

== History ==
=== Crusader/Ayyubid and Mamluk periods ===
Deir Yassin has been identified as one of the villages given as a fief to the Church of the Holy Sepulchre in the 12th century. However, in 1136 Fulk, King of Jerusalem confirmed it was a casale under the Knights Hospitallers. It has been suggested that a vaulted building in the center of the village could have been of Crusader or Mamluk origin.

Tawfiq Canaan noted that a yellow stone, popular in the Jerusalem Mamluk ablaq building decorations, was apparently quarried at Deir Yassin towards the end of the fifteenth century.

=== Ottoman period ===
During the Ottoman era, which began in 1517, the nucleus of settlement activity in the area was Khirbet Ayn al-Tut ("The Ruin of the Mulberry Spring")—some 500 meters (1,600 ft) west of the 1948 village site. In 1596, this village was under the administration of the nahiya (subdistrict) of Jerusalem, part of the sanjak (district) of Jerusalem. It had a population of seven Muslim households, who paid taxes on wheat, barley, and olive trees; a total of 4,522 akçe. All of the revenue went to a waqf.

The inauguration of a hospital in Deir Yassin, 1914

It is unknown precisely when settlement shifted to Deir Yassin. The village was named in honor of a certain Sheikh Yassin whose tomb was in a mosque, or shrine located just outside the village, on a high spot, dominating the surrounding area. The village guesthouse, or Madafeh, was located opposite the shrine.

Edward Robinson noted the village in 1838, and by 1870, an Ottoman village list indicated 13 houses and a population of 48, though the list only counted men. In 1896 the population of Deir Yassin was estimated to be about 138 persons.

In the late 19th century, the houses of Deir Yassin were built of stone. Two springs—one located in the north and another in the south—supplied water to the village. Most of its houses, strongly built with thick walls, were clustered in a small area known as the Hara meaning "Quarter" or "Neighborhood". All residents were Muslims. In 1906, a Jewish suburb of Jerusalem, Givat Shaul, was built across the valley from Deir Yassin. The secondary road linking the village to Jerusalem and the road to Jaffa ran through the suburb.

=== World War I and British Mandate ===
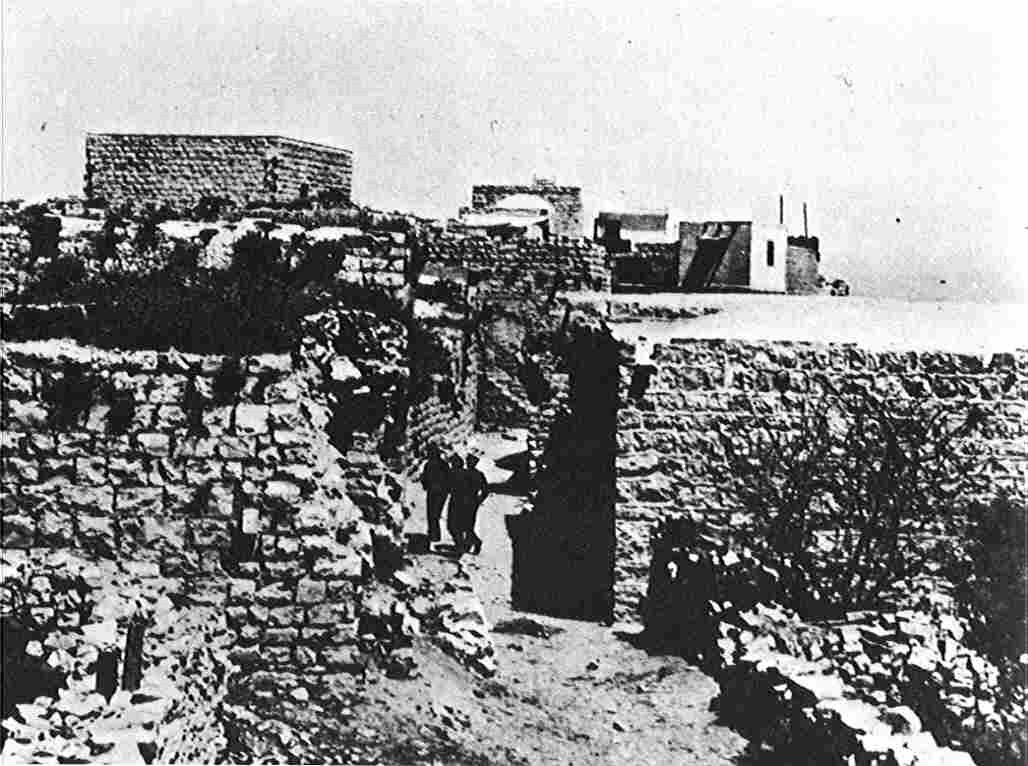
Deir Yassin in the 1930s

During World War I, the Ottomans fortified the hilltop of Deir Yassin as part of the defense system of Jerusalem, but on December 8, 1917, these fortifications were stormed by the Allied Forces under Edmund Allenby. The following day Jerusalem fell to the British. Until the 1920s, Deir Yassin's inhabitants mostly depended on agriculture and livestock for income, but the extensive building projects in Jerusalem in the British Mandate period transformed the basis of its economy.

Deir Yassin's inhabitants prospered from mining, its main source of employment. A rich vein of hard yellow limestone, known as mizi yahudi was prized for its resistance to the rigors of Jerusalem's climate. The quarry (hajar yasinik or "Yasin's stone") supplied the Jerusalem market, and the wealth allowed the village to develop spacious housing, two elementary schools and mosques. By the late 1940s, there were four stone crushers functioning in the village. The business encouraged the wealthier inhabitants to invest in trucking while others became truck drivers. In 1935, a local bus company was established in a joint venture with the neighboring Arab village of Lifta. As Deir Yassin prospered, houses radiated from the Hara uphill and eastward, towards Jerusalem.

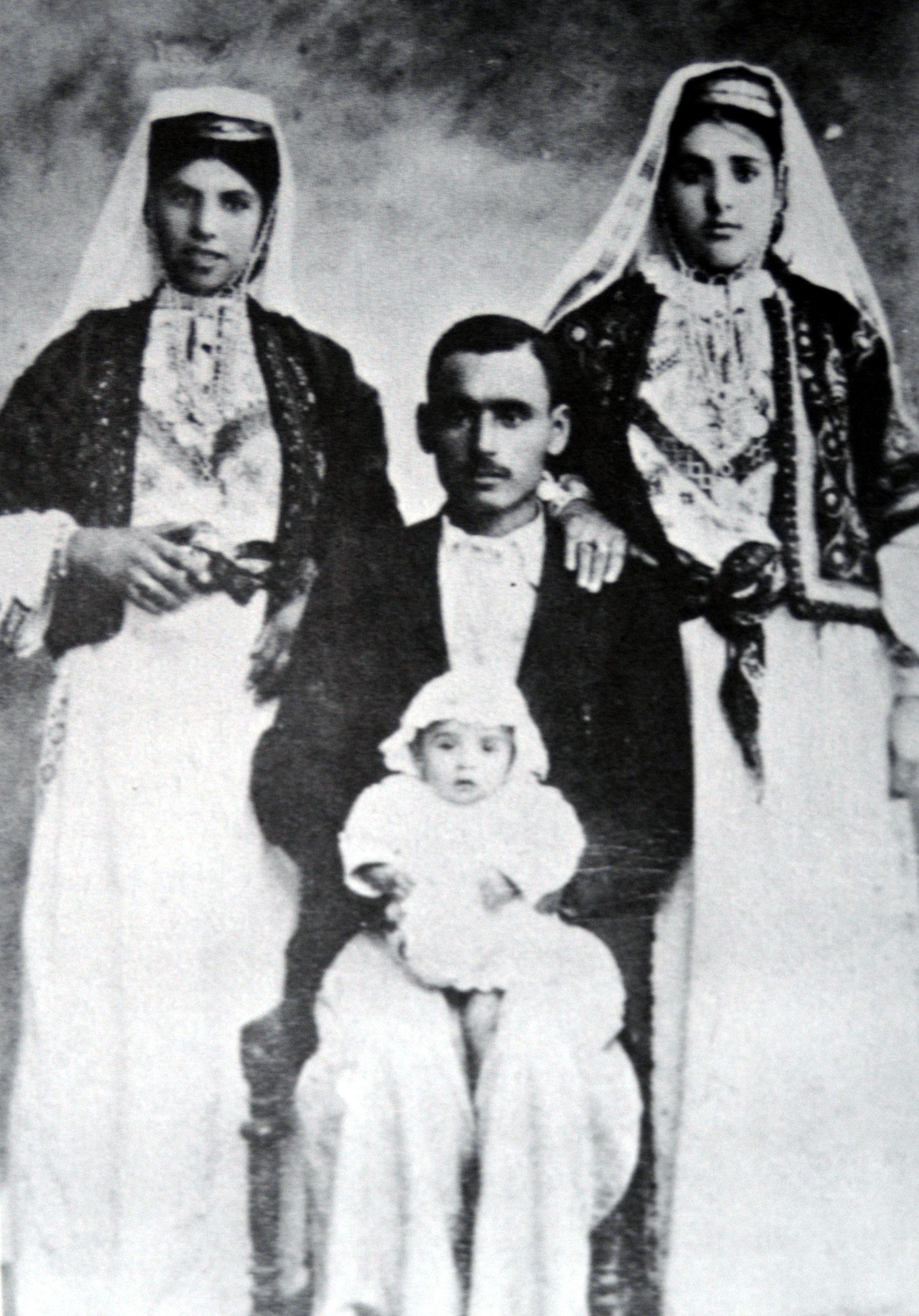
Family from Deir Yassin, 1927.

In the early days of the British Mandate, Deir Yassin had no school of its own and its children attended the school at Lifta or in Qalunya. By 1943, two elementary schools were built—one for boys and one for girls. The girls' school had a resident headmistress from Jerusalem. At that time, Deir Yassin also had a bakery, two guesthouses, and a social club—the "Renaissance Club", a thrift fund, three shops, four wells and a second mosque built by Mahmud Salah, an affluent resident. Many inhabitants were employed outside the village in the nearby British Army camps as waiters, carpenters, and foremen; others as clerks and teachers in the mandatory civil service. By this time, no more than 15% of the population was engaged in agriculture.

Relations between Deir Yassin and its Jewish neighbors had started reasonably well under the Ottomans, particularly early on when Arabic-speaking Sephardic Yemenite Jews comprised much of the surrounding population. Relations rapidly deteriorated with the growth of Zionism in Palestine and reached their apex during the Arab revolt in 1936-1939. Relations picked up again during the economic boom years of full employment of World War II. Thus, in 1948, Deir Yassin was a prosperous, expanding village at relative peace with its Jewish neighbors with whom much business was done.

=== April 1948 ===
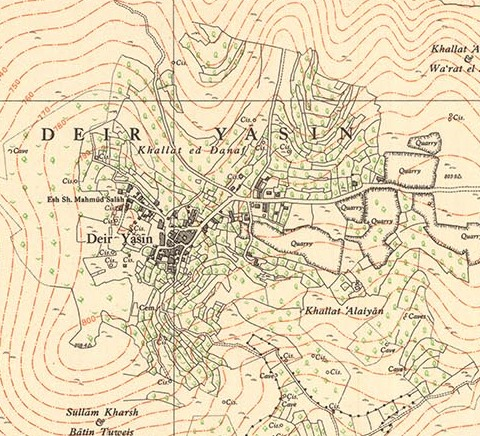
Deir Yassin in the 1940s Survey of Palestine map

When hostilities erupted in 1948, the villagers of Deir Yassin and those of the nearby Jewish village of Giv'at Shaul signed a pact, later approved at Haganah headquarters, to maintain their good relations, exchange information on movement of outsiders through village territory, and ensure the safety of vehicles from the village. The inhabitants of Deir Yassin upheld the agreement scrupulously, resisting infiltration by Arab irregulars. Though this was known to the Irgun and Lehi forces, they attacked the village on April 9, 1948. The assault was beaten off initially, with the attackers suffering 40 wounded. Only the intervention of a Palmach unit, using mortars, allowed them to occupy the village. Houses were blown up with people inside and people shot: 107 villagers, including women and children, were killed. The survivors were loaded on trucks that were driven through Jerusalem in a victory parade, with some sources describing further violence by Lehi soldiers. Four Irgun or Lehi men were killed. The incident became known as the Deir Yassin massacre.

On April 10, 1948, one day after the Deir Yassin massacre, Albert Einstein wrote a critical letter to the American Friends of Fighters for the Freedom of Israel (the U.S chapter of Lehi) refusing to assist them with aid or support to raise money for their cause in Palestine. On December 2, 1948, many prominent American Jews signed and published an op-ed article in The New York Times critical of Menachem Begin and the massacre at Deir Yassin.

=== Post-1948 ===
Following the war, the area was incorporated into the State of Israel. A year later, the Jewish neighborhood of Givat Shaul Bet was built on Deir Yassin's land, despite Israeli scholars' protests to Prime Minister David Ben-Gurion. In 1951, the Kfar Shaul Mental Health Center was built within the village itself, using some abandoned village buildings themselves. In 1980, the remaining ruins of the village were bulldozed to clear the ground for new Orthodox Jewish neighborhoods. In the early 1980s, most of the Deir Yassin cemetery was bulldozed and a new highway to Givat Shaul Bet was paved in its place.

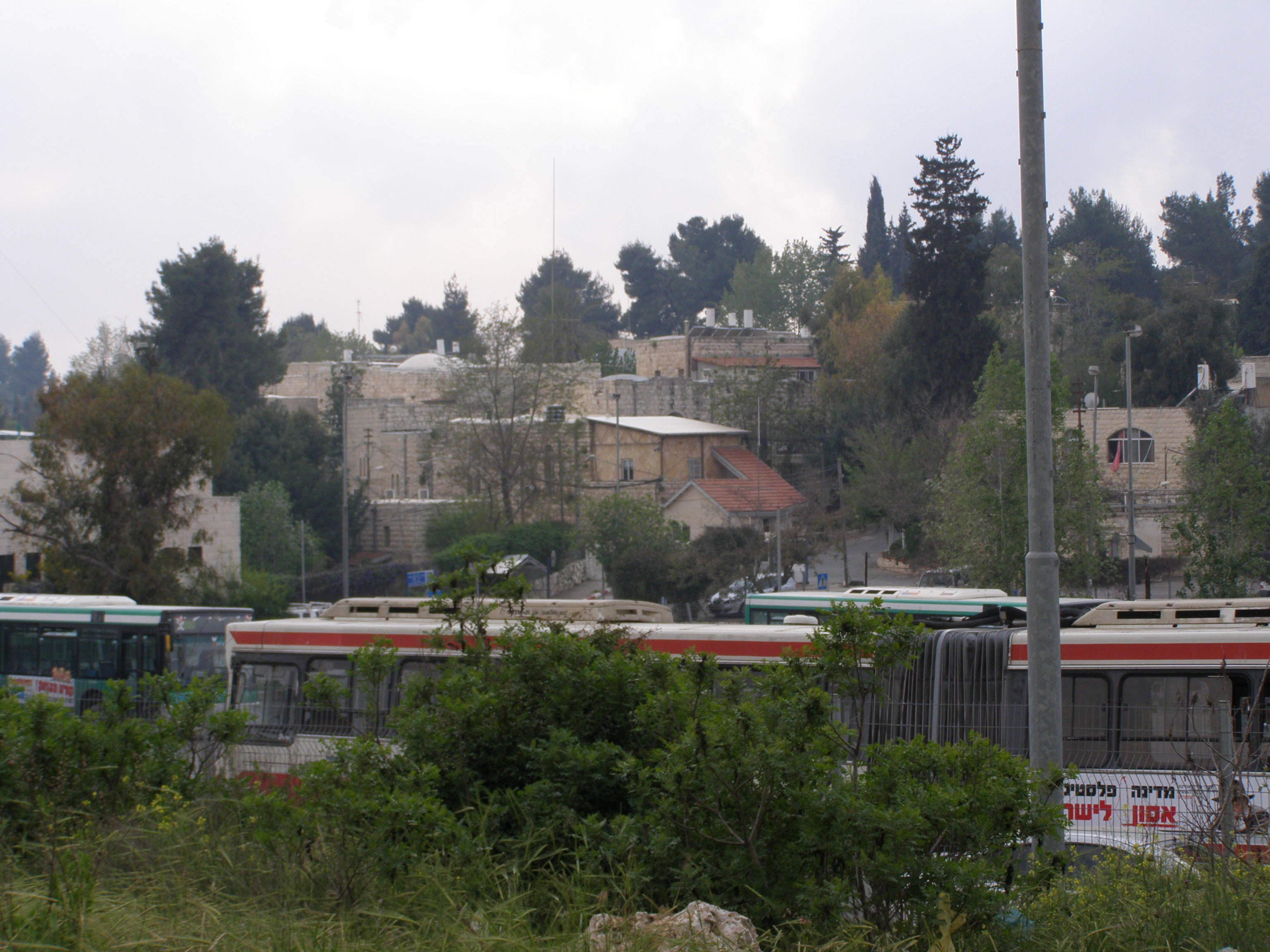
The villages' houses and its school are now used by the Kfar Shaul Mental Health Center, an Israeli public psychiatric hospital.

In 1992, Palestinian historian Walid Khalidi wrote:

Many of the village houses on the hill are still standing and have been incorporated into an Israeli hospital for the mentally ill that was established on the site. Some houses outside the fence of the hospital grounds are used for residential and commercial purposes, or as warehouses. Outside the fence, there are carob and almond trees and the stumps of olive trees. Several wells are located at the southwestern edge of the site. The old village cemetery, southeast of the site, is unkempt and threatened by debris from a ring road that has been constructed around the village hill. One tall cypress tree still stands at the center of the cemetery.

The killings at Deir Yassin are regarded as one of two pivotal events that led to the exodus of around 700,000 Palestinians from their towns and villages in 1948, along with the defeat of the Palestinians in Haifa. News of the killings, amplified by Arab media broadcasts of atrocity, triggered fear and panic among Palestinians, who in turn increasingly evacuated their homes.

== Geography ==
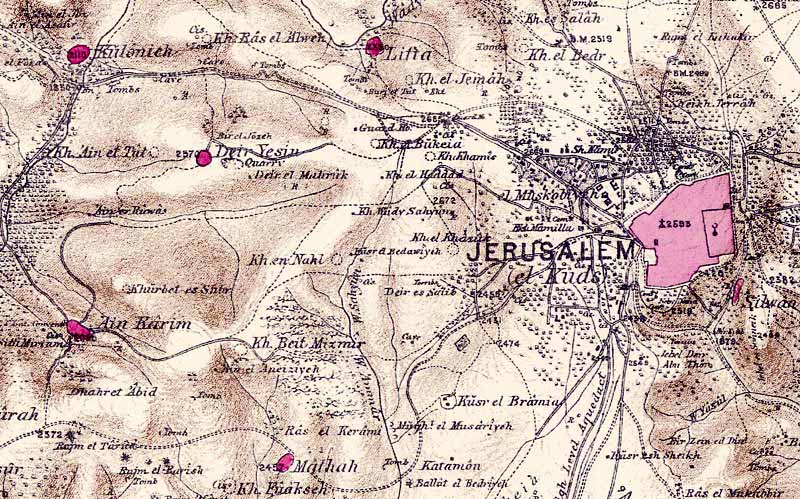
Map showing Deir Yassin in relation to Jerusalem in the 1870s

Deir Yassin was built on the eastern slopes of a hill, with an elevation of roughly 800 meters (2,600 ft) above sea level and commanding a wide view all around it. The village faced the western suburbs of Jerusalem which were 1 kilometer (0.62 mi) away. The city center of Jerusalem was about 5 kilometers (3.1 mi) to the east. It was separated from the city by a terraced valley planted with fig, almond, and olive orchards. Along the northern rim of the valley ran a secondary road linking Deir Yassin to the suburbs and to the main Jaffa Road which was about 2 kilometers (1.2 mi) to the north.

The total land area of the village consisted of 2,857 dunams (286 hectares), of which 94.5% was Arab-owned, 5.3% was Jewish-owned and the remainder was public property. Cultivable land amounted to a total of 866 dunams (30%) (87 hectares), all of which was grown with grains and owned mostly by Arabs. The built-up area of the village was 12 dunams.

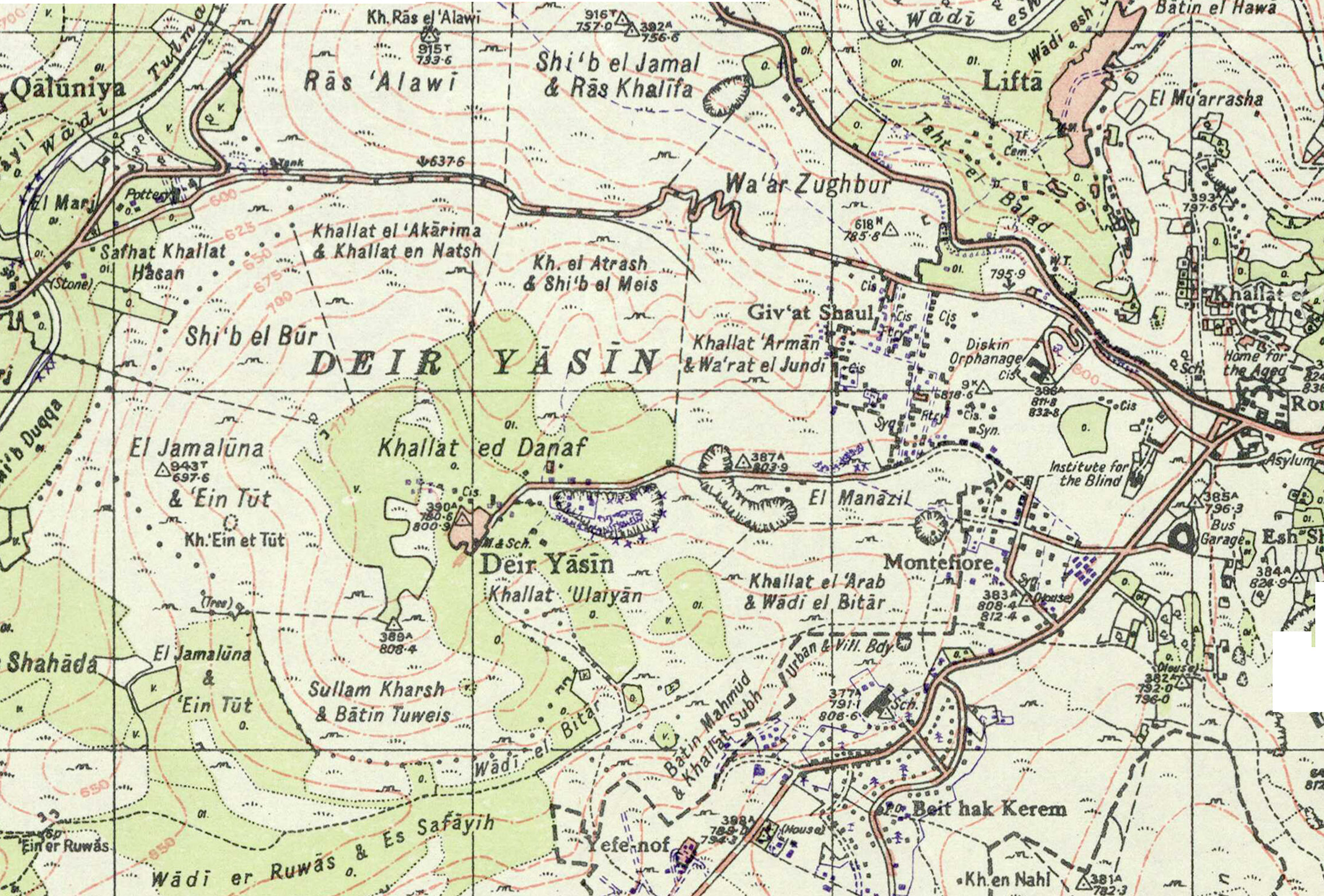
Map showing Deir Yassin and its surroundings in 1948

== Demographics ==
Khirbet Ayn al-Tut had a population of 39 in 1596, during early Ottoman rule. In the 1922 British Mandate census, Deir Yassin had a population of 254. Its population had increased from 429 in the 1931 census to 750 in 1948 and its houses from 91 in the former year to 144 in the latter. Before its ravage in 1948, it is estimated that Deir Yassin had 610 Muslim inhabitants in the 1945 statistics. The five hamulas (clans) of Deir Yassin were the Shahada, 'Aql, Hamidad, Jabir and Jundi.

== Gallery ==
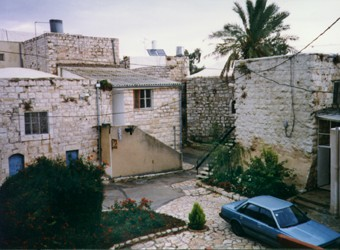
Village remains images by Daniel A. McGowan

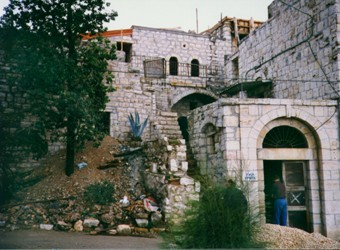

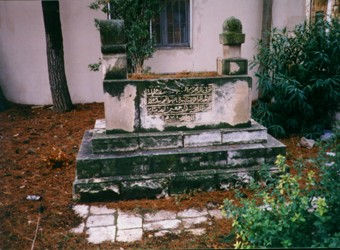

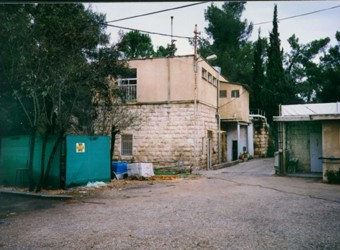

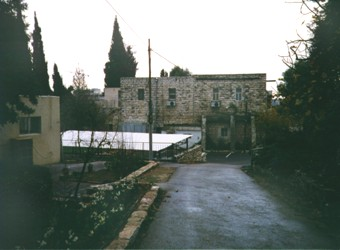

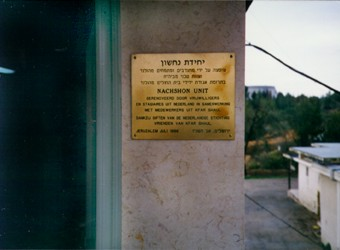

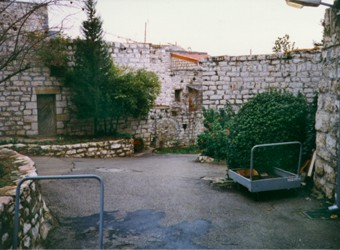

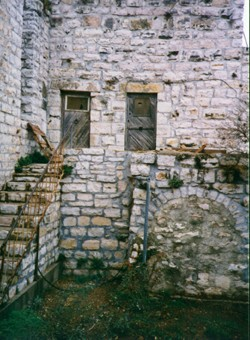

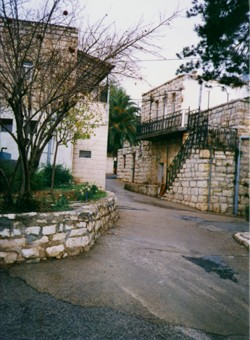

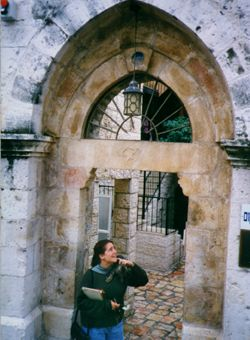

== Bibliography ==
- Barron, J.B., ed. (1923). Palestine: Report and General Abstracts of the Census of 1922. Government of Palestine.
- Benveniśtî, M. (2000). Sacred landscape: the buried history of the Holy Land since 1948 (Illustrated ed.). University of California Press. ISBN 0-520-21154-5.
- Burgoyne, Michael Hamilton (1987). Mamluk Jerusalem. British School of Archaeology in Jerusalem by the World of Islam Festival Trust. ISBN 090503533X.
- Canaan, T. (1927). Mohammedan Saints and Sanctuaries in Palestine. London: Luzac & Co.
- Canaan, T. (1933). The Palestine Arab House: Its Architecture and Folklore. Jerusalem: The Syrian Orphanage Press.
- Conder, C.R.; Kitchener, H.H. (1883). The Survey of Western Palestine: Memoirs of the Topography, Orography, Hydrography, and Archaeology. Vol. 3. London: Committee of the Palestine Exploration Fund.
- Delaville Le Roulx, J. (1894). Cartulaire général de l'Ordre des Hospitaliers (in Latin). Vol. 1. Paris.
- Delaville Le Roulx, J. (1906). Cartulaire général de l'Ordre des Hospitaliers (in Latin). Vol. 4. Paris.
- Government of Palestine, Department of Statistics (1945). Village Statistics, April, 1945.
- Hadawi, S. (1970). Village Statistics of 1945: A Classification of Land and Area ownership in Palestine. Palestine Liberation Organization Research Center.
- Hartmann, M. (1883). "Die Ortschaftenliste des Liwa Jerusalem in dem türkischen Staatskalender für Syrien auf das Jahr 1288 der Flucht (1871)". Zeitschrift des Deutschen Palästina-Vereins. 6: 102–149.
- Hütteroth, W.-D.; Abdulfattah, K. (1977). Historical Geography of Palestine, Transjordan and Southern Syria in the Late 16th Century. Erlanger Geographische Arbeiten, Sonderband 5. Erlangen, Germany: Vorstand der Fränkischen Geographischen Gesellschaft. ISBN 3-920405-41-2.
- Kark, R.; Oren-Nordheim, Michal (2001). Jerusalem and Its Environs: Quarters, Neighborhoods, Villages, 1800-1948. Wayne State University Press. ISBN 0-8143-2909-8.
- Khalidi, W. (1992). All That Remains: The Palestinian Villages Occupied and Depopulated by Israel in 1948. Washington D.C.: Institute for Palestine Studies. ISBN 0-88728-224-5.
- Mills, E., ed. (1932). Census of Palestine 1931. Population of Villages, Towns and Administrative Areas. Jerusalem: Government of Palestine.
- Moreno, J.L. (1959). Progress in Psychotherapy. Grune & Stratton.
- Morris, B. (2004). The Birth of the Palestinian Refugee Problem Revisited. Cambridge University Press. ISBN 978-0-521-00967-6.
- Palmer, E.H. (1881). The Survey of Western Palestine: Arabic and English Name Lists Collected During the Survey by Lieutenants Conder and Kitchener, R. E. Transliterated and Explained by E.H. Palmer. Committee of the Palestine Exploration Fund.
- Pringle, D. (1997). Secular buildings in the Crusader Kingdom of Jerusalem: an archaeological Gazetter. Cambridge University Press. ISBN 0521-46010-7.
- Robinson, E.; Smith, E. (1841). Biblical Researches in Palestine, Mount Sinai and Arabia Petraea: A Journal of Travels in the year 1838. Vol. 2. Boston: Crocker & Brewster.
- Röhricht, R. (1893). (RRH) Regesta regni Hierosolymitani (MXCVII-MCCXCI) (in Latin). Berlin: Libraria Academica Wageriana.
- Segev, T. (1998). 1949. The First Israelis. Owl Books by Henry Holt and Company.
- Schick, C. (1896). "Zur Einwohnerzahl des Bezirks Jerusalem". Zeitschrift des Deutschen Palästina-Vereins. 19: 120–127.
- Socin, A. (1879). "Alphabetisches Verzeichnis von Ortschaften des Paschalik Jerusalem". Zeitschrift des Deutschen Palästina-Vereins. 2: 135–163.
- Tessler, Mark A. (1994). A History of the Israeli-Palestinian Conflict. Indiana University Press. ISBN 0253208734.
- Tobler, T. (1854). Dr. Titus Toblers zwei Bucher Topographie von Jerusalem und seinen Umgebungen (in German). Vol. 2. Berlin: G. Reimer.
