= Johnny Carroll (association footballer) =

Irish footballer (1924–2001)

Personal information
- Date of birth: 28 May 1924
- Place of birth: Limerick, Ireland
- Date of death: 17 October 2001 (aged 77)
- Place of death: Limerick, Ireland
- Position: Centre-forward

Senior career*
Years	Team	Apps	(Gls)
–1948	Limerick		
1948–1949	West Ham United	5	(0)
1949–	Corby Town		
- * Club domestic league appearances and goals

John Peter Carroll (28 May 1924 – 17 October 2001) was an Irish footballer who played as a centre-forward for Limerick, West Ham United and Corby Town.

== Footballing career ==
Carroll played for Limerick before signing for West Ham in 1948 along with his fellow countrymen, Danny McGowan and Fred Kearns. He made his debut against Sheffield Wednesday on 30 August 1948. Carroll played only five times in his West Ham career in all competitions without scoring. In 1949 he moved to Corby Town.

== Personal life and death ==
Carroll was born in Limerick, Ireland on 28 May 1924. He died in Limerick on 17 October 2001, at the age of 77.
