= Raúl Córdoba =

Mexican footballer (1924–2017)

Personal information
- Full name: Raúl Córdoba Alcalá
- Date of birth: 13 March 1924
- Place of birth: León, Guanajuato, Mexico
- Date of death: 17 May 2017 (aged 93)
- Position: Goalkeeper

Senior career*
Years	Team	Apps	(Gls)
- Club San Sebastián
- Oro
- Toluca
- Club Atlas

International career
1949–1952	Mexico	5	(0)
- * Club domestic league appearances and goals

Raúl Córdoba Alcalá (13 March 1924 – 17 May 2017) was a Mexican football goalkeeper who played for Mexico in the 1950 FIFA World Cup. Córdoba played for the 1951 Club Atlas squad that won the 1951 league championship. He also played for Club San Sebastián de León, Club Deportivo Oro, and Deportivo Toluca in his career. Córdoba died May 17, 2017, at the age of 93.
