= Dick Grieve =

Scottish footballer

Personal information
- Full name: Richard Maxwell Grieve
- Date of birth: 29 June 1924
- Place of birth: Aberdeen, Scotland
- Date of death: 12 February 1997 (aged 72)
- Place of death: Aberdeen, Scotland
- Position: Inside forward

Senior career*
Years	Team	Apps	(Gls)
- Montrose
1950	Rochdale	0	(0)
1950–1951	Wrexham	1	(0)
1951	Dundee United	1	(0)
- * Club domestic league appearances and goals

Richard Maxwell Grieve (29 June 1924 – 12 February 1997) was a Scottish professional footballer, who played as an inside forward. He made 1 appearance in the English Football League with Wrexham, and also 1 appearance with at the time Scottish League Division B side Dundee United.
