= 1924–25 Football League =

33rd season of the Football League

The Football League
- Season: 1924–25
- Champions: Huddersfield Town

The 1924–25 season was the 33rd season of The Football League.

== Final league tables ==
The tables and results below are reproduced here in the exact form that they can be found at The Rec.Sport.Soccer Statistics Foundation website and in Rothmans Book of Football League Records 1888–89 to 1978–79, with home and away statistics separated.

Beginning with the season 1894–95, clubs finishing level on points were separated according to goal average (goals scored divided by goals conceded), or more properly put, goal ratio. In case one or more teams had the same goal difference, this system favoured those teams who had scored fewer goals. The goal average system was eventually scrapped beginning with the 1976–77 season. From the 1922–23 season on, Re-election was required of the bottom two teams of both Third Division North and Third Division South.

== First Division ==
First Division
- Season: 1924–25
- Champions: Huddersfield Town; 2nd English title
- Relegated: Preston North End; Nottingham Forest
- Matches: 462
- Goals: 1,192 (2.58 per match)
- Top goalscorer: Frank Roberts (31 goals)
- Biggest home win: Leeds United 6–0 Aston Villa (25 December 1924); Blackburn Rovers 7–1 Birmingham (2 April 1925); Bolton Wanderers 6–0 Blackburn Rovers (22 April 1925)
- Biggest away win: Sheffield United 0–5 Manchester City (27 September 1924); Arsenal 0–5 Huddersfield Town (14 February 1925)
- Highest scoring: Burnley 5–4 West Ham United (28 February 1925)

Pos	Team	Pld	W	D	L	GF	GA	GAv	Pts	Relegation
1	Huddersfield Town (C)	42	21	16	5	69	28	2.464	58	
2	West Bromwich Albion	42	23	10	9	58	34	1.706	56	
3	Bolton Wanderers	42	22	11	9	76	34	2.235	55	
4	Liverpool	42	20	10	12	63	55	1.145	50	
5	Bury	42	17	15	10	54	51	1.059	49	
6	Newcastle United	42	16	16	10	61	42	1.452	48	
7	Sunderland	42	19	10	13	64	51	1.255	48	
8	Birmingham	42	17	12	13	49	53	0.925	46	
9	Notts County	42	16	13	13	42	31	1.355	45	
10	Manchester City	42	17	9	16	76	68	1.118	43	
11	Cardiff City	42	16	11	15	56	51	1.098	43	
12	Tottenham Hotspur	42	15	12	15	52	43	1.209	42	
13	West Ham United	42	15	12	15	62	60	1.033	42	
14	Sheffield United	42	13	13	16	55	63	0.873	39	
15	Aston Villa	42	13	13	16	58	71	0.817	39	
16	Blackburn Rovers	42	11	13	18	53	66	0.803	35	
17	Everton	42	12	11	19	40	60	0.667	35	
18	Leeds United	42	11	12	19	46	59	0.780	34	
19	Burnley	42	11	12	19	46	75	0.613	34	
20	Arsenal	42	14	5	23	46	58	0.793	33	
21	Preston North End (R)	42	10	6	26	37	74	0.500	26	Relegation to the Second Division
22	Nottingham Forest (R)	42	6	12	24	29	65	0.446	24	Relegation to the Second Division

Source: World Football
Rules for classification: 1) Points; 2) Goal average; 3) Goals scored
(C) Champions; (R) Relegated

=== Results ===
Home \ Away	ARS	AST	BIR	BLB	BOL	BUR	BRY	CAR	EVE	HUD	LEE	LIV	MCI	NEW	NOT	NTC	PNE	SHU	SUN	TOT	WBA	WHU
Arsenal		1–1	0–1	1–0	1–0	5–0	0–1	1–1	3–1	0–5	6–1	2–0	1–0	0–2	2–1	0–1	4–0	2–0	0–0	1–0	2–0	1–2
Aston Villa	4–0		1–0	4–3	2–2	3–0	3–3	1–2	3–1	1–1	2–1	1–4	2–1	0–0	2–0	0–0	1–0	1–1	1–4	0–1	1–0	1–1
Birmingham	2–1	1–0		1–1	1–0	1–0	0–1	2–1	2–2	0–1	0–0	5–2	2–1	1–1	1–1	1–0	3–0	1–1	2–1	0–2	0–0	1–1
Blackburn Rovers	1–0	1–1	7–1		0–2	0–3	0–1	3–1	3–0	2–3	2–3	3–1	3–1	1–1	0–0	0–2	0–1	2–2	1–1	1–1	1–0	0–1
Bolton Wanderers	4–1	4–0	3–0	6–0		5–0	3–3	3–0	1–0	1–0	1–0	2–0	4–2	3–2	1–0	1–0	6–1	3–1	1–2	3–0	1–1	5–0
Burnley	1–0	1–1	3–2	3–5	0–0		4–0	0–0	0–0	1–5	1–1	2–1	1–0	1–3	0–0	1–1	1–0	1–1	1–2	1–4	0–1	5–4
Bury	2–0	4–3	1–4	1–1	1–0	1–0		4–1	1–0	0–1	1–0	0–0	0–2	0–0	3–0	2–1	1–1	1–0	3–0	5–2	0–2	4–2
Cardiff City	1–1	2–1	1–0	3–0	1–2	4–0	4–1		2–1	2–2	3–0	1–3	0–2	3–0	2–0	1–1	0–0	1–1	2–0	0–2	0–1	2–1
Everton	2–3	2–0	2–1	1–0	2–2	3–2	0–0	1–2		0–2	1–0	0–1	3–1	0–1	3–1	1–0	0–0	1–1	0–3	1–0	1–0	1–0
Huddersfield Town	4–0	4–1	0–1	0–0	0–0	2–0	2–0	0–0	2–0		2–0	1–1	1–1	0–0	3–0	0–0	1–0	2–1	4–0	1–2	1–1	1–2
Leeds United	1–0	6–0	0–1	1–1	2–1	0–2	1–0	0–0	1–0	1–1		4–1	0–3	1–1	1–1	1–1	4–0	1–1	1–1	1–0	0–1	2–1
Liverpool	2–1	2–4	1–1	0–0	0–0	3–0	4–0	1–2	3–1	2–3	1–0		5–3	1–1	3–0	1–0	3–1	4–1	3–1	1–0	1–1	2–0
Manchester City	2–0	1–0	2–2	1–3	2–2	3–3	0–0	2–2	2–2	1–1	4–2	5–0		3–1	4–2	2–1	2–1	2–1	1–3	1–0	1–2	3–1
Newcastle United	2–2	4–1	4–0	4–0	0–1	3–0	2–2	1–2	1–1	1–3	4–1	0–0	2–0		4–1	1–0	3–1	0–0	2–0	1–1	0–1	4–1
Nottingham Forest	0–2	0–2	1–1	0–2	1–1	0–0	2–0	2–1	0–1	0–1	4–0	0–1	0–3	1–1		0–0	0–1	2–3	1–1	1–0	0–1	2–1
Notts County	2–1	0–0	0–1	0–0	0–1	2–0	1–1	3–0	3–1	1–1	1–0	1–2	2–0	2–0	0–0		1–0	2–0	4–1	0–0	0–2	4–1
Preston North End	2–0	3–2	1–0	3–2	1–0	0–2	1–1	1–3	1–1	1–4	1–4	4–0	2–3	0–1	3–1	0–1		0–1	1–2	0–3	1–2	3–2
Sheffield United	2–1	2–2	4–3	2–3	2–0	4–0	0–1	1–0	1–1	1–1	1–1	0–1	0–5	1–2	1–2	2–0	3–0		2–1	2–0	2–0	1–1
Sunderland	2–0	1–1	4–0	1–0	1–0	1–1	1–1	1–0	4–1	1–1	2–1	3–0	3–2	1–1	3–1	0–1	2–0	0–1		4–1	3–0	1–1
Tottenham Hotspur	2–0	1–3	0–1	5–0	3–0	1–1	1–1	1–1	0–0	1–2	2–1	1–1	1–1	3–0	1–0	1–1	2–0	4–1	1–0		0–1	1–1
West Bromwich Albion	2–0	4–1	1–1	1–1	0–0	1–4	1–1	1–0	3–0	1–0	3–1	0–0	3–1	2–0	5–1	1–2	1–1	2–1	2–1	2–0		4–1
West Ham United	1–0	2–0	0–1	2–0	1–1	2–0	1–1	3–2	4–1	0–0	0–0	0–1	4–0	0–0	0–0	3–0	1–0	6–2	4–1	1–1	2–1	

Legend: Blue = home team win; Yellow = draw; Red = away team win.

=== Maps ===
Locations of the Football League First Division teams
Locations of the Football League First Division London teams

== Second Division ==
Football League Second Division
- Season: 1924–25
- Champions: Leicester City (1st title)
- Relegated: Coventry City; Crystal Palace
- Matches: 462
- Goals: 1,068 (2.31 per match)
- Top goalscorer: Arthur Chandler (Leicester), 33
- Biggest home win: Leicester City – Port Vale 7–0 (25 Dec 1924)
- Biggest away win: Oldham Athletic – Chelsea 0–5 (6 Sept 1924); Wolverhampton Wanderers – Portsmouth 0–5 (14 Feb 1925)
- Highest scoring: Leicester City – Port Vale 7–0 (25 Dec 1924); Derby County – Portsmouth 6–1 (3 Jan 1925); Leicester City – The Wednesday 6–1 (7 Feb 1925); South Shields – Barnsley 5–2 (24 Jan 1925); Hull City – Barnsley 5–2 (11 Oct 1924)

Pos	Team	Pld	W	D	L	GF	GA	GAv	Pts	Promotion or relegation
1	Leicester City (C, P)	42	24	11	7	90	32	2.813	59	Promotion to the First Division
2	Manchester United (P)	42	23	11	8	57	23	2.478	57	Promotion to the First Division
3	Derby County	42	22	11	9	71	36	1.972	55	
4	Portsmouth	42	15	18	9	58	50	1.160	48	
5	Chelsea	42	16	15	11	51	37	1.378	47	
6	Wolverhampton Wanderers	42	20	6	16	55	51	1.078	46	
7	Southampton	42	13	18	11	40	36	1.111	44	
8	Port Vale	42	17	8	17	48	56	0.857	42	
9	South Shields	42	12	17	13	42	38	1.105	41	
10	Hull City	42	15	11	16	50	49	1.020	41	
11	Clapton Orient	42	14	12	16	42	42	1.000	40	
12	Fulham	42	15	10	17	41	56	0.732	40	
13	Middlesbrough	42	10	19	13	36	44	0.818	39	
14	The Wednesday	42	15	8	19	50	56	0.893	38	
15	Barnsley	42	13	12	17	46	59	0.780	38	
16	Bradford City	42	13	12	17	37	50	0.740	38	
17	Blackpool	42	14	9	19	65	61	1.066	37	
18	Oldham Athletic	42	13	11	18	35	51	0.686	37	
19	Stockport County	42	13	11	18	37	57	0.649	37	
20	Stoke	42	12	11	19	34	46	0.739	35	
21	Crystal Palace (R)	42	12	10	20	38	54	0.704	34	Relegation to the Third Division South
22	Coventry City (R)	42	11	9	22	45	84	0.536	31	Relegation to the Third Division North

(C) Champions; (P) Promoted; (R) Relegated

=== Results ===
Home \ Away	BAR	BLP	BRA	CHE	CLA	COV	CRY	DER	FUL	HUL	LEI	MUN	MID	OLD	POR	PTV	SOU	SSH	STP	STK	WED	WOL
Barnsley		2–4	3–1	3–3	1–1	3–1	3–0	3–0	1–0	1–2	1–1	0–0	1–0	0–0	1–4	1–3	1–1	1–0	0–1	1–1	3–0	0–0
Blackpool	1–2		1–2	1–2	1–0	3–1	0–1	5–1	4–1	0–0	2–1	1–1	1–1	1–2	1–1	4–1	1–0	5–0	0–1	1–2	2–2	2–4
Bradford City	1–0	1–0		2–0	0–0	1–0	0–0	0–3	1–1	4–1	1–1	0–1	0–1	1–1	2–0	1–1	1–2	1–0	3–0	1–0	2–0	3–1
Chelsea	0–1	3–0	3–0		1–1	1–0	2–2	1–1	0–0	1–0	4–0	0–0	2–0	4–1	2–3	1–0	1–0	1–1	1–1	2–1	0–0	1–0
Clapton Orient	0–0	1–0	0–0	0–0		1–2	3–0	0–1	3–0	0–0	0–1	0–1	0–1	5–1	1–1	3–1	1–0	0–0	1–1	0–2	1–0	2–1
Coventry City	3–2	2–1	0–0	0–3	1–0		1–4	0–0	0–1	0–0	4–2	1–0	2–2	5–1	2–1	0–0	1–0	0–1	4–2	3–1	1–1	2–4
Crystal Palace	0–1	1–2	4–1	1–0	0–1	0–0		2–0	1–2	1–0	0–2	2–1	2–2	0–1	1–2	0–0	3–1	0–0	3–0	0–1	0–1	2–1
Derby County	1–1	2–2	2–0	1–0	3–0	5–1	3–0		5–1	4–0	0–3	1–0	3–1	1–0	6–1	4–1	3–0	0–0	2–0	1–2	2–1	0–1
Fulham	1–2	1–0	1–1	1–2	0–2	2–0	3–1	0–2		4–0	2–2	1–0	0–0	1–0	0–0	1–1	1–0	1–1	2–0	1–0	2–1	1–0
Hull City	5–2	1–1	0–0	1–0	2–1	4–1	5–0	1–1	3–0		2–1	0–1	0–0	1–0	5–0	2–1	1–1	0–1	3–0	0–0	4–2	0–1
Leicester City	6–0	0–2	1–0	4–0	4–2	5–1	3–1	0–0	4–0	1–0		3–0	0–0	3–0	4–0	7–0	0–0	1–1	4–0	0–1	6–1	2–0
Manchester United	1–0	0–0	3–0	1–0	4–2	5–1	1–0	1–1	2–0	2–0	1–0		2–0	0–1	2–0	4–0	1–1	1–0	2–0	2–0	2–0	3–0
Middlesbrough	2–0	4–1	1–0	1–1	1–1	1–1	0–0	1–3	1–3	0–1	1–5	1–1		0–0	1–1	0–1	0–0	1–1	1–1	1–0	2–0	2–0
Oldham Athletic	2–0	4–1	1–3	0–5	2–1	5–0	0–2	0–1	0–0	1–0	0–1	0–3	0–0		0–2	2–0	1–1	1–0	0–0	2–0	1–1	2–0
Portsmouth	0–0	1–1	5–0	0–0	0–2	1–0	0–0	1–1	3–0	2–0	1–1	1–1	3–1	2–2		2–0	1–1	1–0	1–1	0–0	1–1	2–2
Port Vale	2–0	1–2	1–0	1–1	4–2	4–0	3–0	2–1	0–1	1–1	1–2	2–1	2–1	1–0	0–2		1–1	0–0	4–1	2–0	1–0	1–3
Southampton	3–1	2–1	2–0	0–0	2–0	3–0	2–0	2–0	1–0	2–2	0–0	0–2	1–1	0–0	0–0	1–0		1–1	2–1	3–0	1–0	1–1
South Shields	5–2	1–3	1–0	1–1	2–0	4–1	1–1	1–0	2–1	2–0	1–1	1–2	0–1	0–0	0–2	3–0	1–1		0–1	4–0	0–1	3–3
Stockport County	1–0	1–0	3–0	4–0	0–1	1–1	1–0	0–0	4–1	0–2	0–2	2–1	1–1	2–0	1–2	0–2	1–1	0–0		2–0	1–0	1–1
Stoke	1–1	3–1	0–0	1–0	0–1	4–1	1–1	1–1	1–1	2–0	1–1	0–0	0–1	0–1	2–1	0–1	2–0	0–0	3–0		0–2	0–3
The Wednesday	1–0	2–6	3–3	2–1	0–0	2–0	0–1	0–1	3–1	5–0	1–4	1–1	2–0	1–0	5–2	0–1	1–0	0–1	3–0	2–1		2–0
Wolverhampton Wanderers	0–1	2–0	2–0	0–1	1–2	3–1	3–1	0–4	2–1	2–1	0–1	0–0	1–0	2–0	0–5	1–0	3–0	2–1	3–0	1–0	1–0	

Source: Ian Laschke: Rothmans Book of Football League Records 1888–89 to 1978–79. Macdonald and Jane’s, London & Sydney, 1980.
Legend: Blue = home team win; Yellow = draw; Red = away team win.

=== Maps ===
Locations of the Football League Second Division teams
Locations of the Football League Second Division London teams

== Third Division North ==
Football League Third Division North
- Season: 1924–25
- Champions: Darlington (1st title)
- Failed re-election: None
- Matches: 462
- Goals: 1,320 (2.86 per match)
- Top goalscorer: David Brown (Darlington), 39

Pos	Team	Pld	W	D	L	GF	GA	GAv	Pts	Qualification
1	Darlington (C, P)	42	24	10	8	78	33	2.364	58	Promotion to the Second Division
2	Nelson	42	23	7	12	79	50	1.580	53	
3	New Brighton	42	23	7	12	75	50	1.500	53	
4	Southport	42	22	7	13	59	37	1.595	51	
5	Bradford (Park Avenue)	42	19	12	11	84	42	2.000	50	
6	Rochdale	42	21	7	14	75	53	1.415	49	
7	Chesterfield	42	17	11	14	60	44	1.364	45	
8	Lincoln City	42	18	8	16	53	58	0.914	44	
9	Halifax Town	42	16	11	15	56	52	1.077	43	
10	Ashington	42	16	10	16	68	76	0.895	42	
11	Wigan Borough	42	15	11	16	62	65	0.954	41	
12	Grimsby Town	42	15	9	18	60	60	1.000	39	
13	Durham City	42	13	13	16	50	68	0.735	39	
14	Barrow	42	16	7	19	51	74	0.689	39	
15	Crewe Alexandra	42	13	13	16	53	78	0.679	39	
16	Wrexham	42	15	8	19	53	61	0.869	38	
17	Accrington Stanley	42	15	8	19	60	72	0.833	38	
18	Doncaster Rovers	42	14	10	18	54	65	0.831	38	
19	Walsall	42	13	11	18	44	53	0.830	37	
20	Hartlepools United	42	12	11	19	45	63	0.714	35	
21	Tranmere Rovers	42	14	4	24	59	78	0.756	32	Re-elected
22	Rotherham County	42	7	7	28	42	88	0.477	21	Re-elected as Rotherham United

Source: rsssf.com
(C) Champions; (P) Promoted

=== Results ===
Home \ Away	ACC	ASH	BRW	BPA	CHF	CRE	DAR	DON	DUR	GRI	HAL	HAR	LIN	NEL	NWB	ROC	ROT	SOU	TRA	WAL	WIG	WRE
Accrington Stanley		2–2	1–2	2–2	2–2	1–0	2–0	3–2	6–0	0–3	2–0	4–1	0–2	2–0	0–1	2–2	2–0	5–1	2–1	1–1	3–1	1–0
Ashington	1–2		5–2	1–0	2–1	1–1	4–2	2–0	0–2	0–2	2–0	0–3	2–1	1–1	1–1	4–3	3–1	2–0	1–0	6–1	1–1	2–0
Barrow	3–1	3–2		2–1	1–0	2–0	0–4	4–0	2–0	3–2	2–1	1–1	1–2	3–0	1–1	1–0	3–1	1–0	1–1	3–2	0–1	2–2
Bradford Park Avenue	3–0	7–1	1–1		3–0	6–1	0–0	4–1	4–1	0–1	2–1	3–0	4–0	1–1	5–2	0–0	3–0	1–0	5–1	2–0	2–2	3–0
Chesterfield	1–0	1–1	1–1	1–1		1–0	0–1	2–1	6–0	2–0	1–3	4–0	2–0	0–1	3–0	2–0	3–2	1–2	4–1	1–0	3–1	3–0
Crewe Alexandra	4–2	1–0	3–1	2–1	1–1		0–5	1–1	3–0	3–1	1–1	3–1	1–1	2–1	1–0	2–0	3–1	1–1	0–2	1–1	1–1	1–2
Darlington	2–1	2–1	3–0	2–1	3–3	5–1		1–1	0–0	0–0	3–0	2–0	0–1	3–1	3–1	2–0	4–0	2–1	2–1	3–0	5–0	3–1
Doncaster Rovers	4–1	7–3	0–0	1–0	0–1	1–1	0–2		0–0	2–2	0–1	1–0	2–1	1–1	1–0	2–1	4–1	0–1	2–0	2–1	5–0	1–0
Durham City	2–0	0–0	6–0	1–0	1–1	4–1	2–1	1–0		6–1	1–2	0–1	5–0	3–1	0–0	3–2	1–1	0–0	0–3	0–2	1–1	1–0
Grimsby Town	4–0	1–3	2–1	2–0	0–0	0–0	0–2	1–1	1–1		1–1	2–1	1–2	2–0	2–3	1–1	3–1	3–1	6–1	2–1	4–0	0–1
Halifax Town	2–2	0–0	2–0	1–3	1–0	2–2	1–1	2–0	3–0	1–0		2–0	1–0	2–4	1–2	3–1	4–0	2–0	1–3	1–1	1–2	3–1
Hartlepools United	3–0	0–1	1–0	2–2	1–0	2–0	1–1	2–2	1–0	2–1	1–1		1–1	2–4	0–2	1–1	0–0	1–2	2–1	3–1	1–0	1–1
Lincoln City	3–0	5–0	2–1	0–4	3–1	4–1	0–1	2–0	3–0	0–0	1–1	2–1		2–1	2–0	1–2	3–1	1–1	3–2	0–1	1–0	1–1
Nelson	4–1	4–0	2–0	2–2	1–0	7–0	1–1	3–0	7–1	1–0	2–1	2–0	1–0		5–0	1–0	4–1	2–1	4–1	2–1	1–0	2–4
New Brighton	4–0	4–4	3–0	0–0	2–1	3–0	1–0	0–2	4–0	3–2	3–1	2–0	4–1	5–0		5–0	3–1	1–1	1–0	3–2	3–0	2–1
Rochdale	0–1	0–0	5–1	2–2	2–1	5–0	2–1	5–2	3–0	2–0	3–1	3–1	3–0	0–1	2–0		4–1	1–0	2–1	3–0	3–2	3–1
Rotherham County	1–1	1–4	0–1	1–1	1–3	1–3	1–1	3–0	1–2	3–0	0–0	1–2	1–1	1–0	2–1	1–3		1–3	2–0	2–0	3–4	0–1
Southport	3–1	3–0	5–0	3–0	0–2	2–0	1–0	3–0	1–1	3–1	3–1	2–0	4–0	1–0	2–0	0–0	2–0		1–0	1–0	0–1	1–0
Tranmere Rovers	2–1	5–4	4–1	2–0	5–1	2–2	0–1	1–2	1–1	2–3	0–2	4–3	0–0	2–0	1–3	3–1	1–0	1–0		0–1	2–3	2–0
Walsall	1–1	1–0	1–0	0–2	0–0	0–0	2–1	4–0	2–2	2–0	0–2	1–1	2–0	1–2	2–1	0–2	0–1	0–0	2–0		3–1	3–0
Wigan Borough	1–2	2–0	2–0	1–0	0–0	3–4	1–1	2–2	0–0	3–1	2–0	0–0	4–0	1–1	0–1	2–3	4–1	2–0	4–0	0–0		5–0
Wrexham	1–0	3–1	3–0	1–3	0–0	2–1	0–2	2–1	3–1	1–2	0–0	3–1	0–1	1–1	0–0	1–0	3–1	2–3	4–0	1–1	6–2	

Source: Ian Laschke: Rothmans Book of Football League Records 1888–89 to 1978–79. Macdonald and Jane’s, London & Sydney, 1980.
Legend: Blue = home team win; Yellow = draw; Red = away team win.

=== Maps ===
Locations of the Football League Third Division North teams

== Third Division South ==
Football League Third Division South
- Season: 1924–25
- Champions: Swansea Town (1st title)
- Failed re-election: None
- Matches: 462
- Goals: 1,120 (2.42 per match)
- Top goalscorer: Jack Fowler (Swansea Town), 28

Pos	Team	Pld	W	D	L	GF	GA	GAv	Pts	Qualification
1	Swansea Town (C, P)	42	23	11	8	68	35	1.943	57	Promotion to the Second Division
2	Plymouth Argyle	42	23	10	9	77	38	2.026	56	
3	Bristol City	42	22	9	11	60	41	1.463	53	
4	Swindon Town	42	20	11	11	66	38	1.737	51	
5	Millwall	42	18	13	11	58	38	1.526	49	
6	Newport County	42	20	9	13	62	42	1.476	49	
7	Exeter City	42	19	9	14	59	48	1.229	47	
8	Brighton & Hove Albion	42	19	8	15	59	45	1.311	46	
9	Northampton Town	42	20	6	16	51	44	1.159	46	
10	Southend United	42	19	5	18	51	61	0.836	43	
11	Watford	42	17	9	16	38	47	0.809	43	
12	Norwich City	42	14	13	15	53	51	1.039	41	
13	Gillingham	42	13	14	15	35	44	0.795	40	
14	Reading	42	14	10	18	37	38	0.974	38	
15	Charlton Athletic	42	13	12	17	46	48	0.958	38	
16	Luton Town	42	10	17	15	49	57	0.860	37	
17	Bristol Rovers	42	12	13	17	42	49	0.857	37	
18	Aberdare Athletic	42	14	9	19	54	67	0.806	37	
19	Queens Park Rangers	42	14	8	20	42	63	0.667	36	
20	Bournemouth & Boscombe Athletic	42	13	8	21	40	58	0.690	34	
21	Brentford	42	9	7	26	38	91	0.418	25	Re-elected
22	Merthyr Town	42	8	5	29	35	77	0.455	21	Re-elected

(C) Champions; (P) Promoted

=== Results ===
Home \ Away	ADE	B&BA	BRE	B&HA	BRI	BRR	CHA	EXE	GIL	LUT	MER	MIL	NPC	NOR	NWC	PLY	QPR	REA	STD	SWA	SWI	WAT
Aberdare Athletic		4–2	2–1	1–2	1–2	2–1	2–0	3–1	2–1	1–1	2–0	0–1	1–3	1–1	2–1	3–1	1–1	3–0	3–0	3–1	1–1	2–0
Bournemouth & Boscombe Athletic	3–1		2–0	0–0	1–3	0–1	2–1	1–1	3–0	2–1	2–0	0–1	0–0	1–2	0–0	0–1	0–2	0–0	1–0	0–2	0–0	2–1
Brentford	2–2	1–2		2–4	1–0	1–1	1–0	2–5	2–1	3–0	2–2	1–0	2–0	1–3	1–1	1–0	0–1	0–1	2–2	3–1	0–0	0–0
Brighton & Hove Albion	4–1	0–1	4–1		1–0	1–0	0–0	2–0	2–0	2–1	3–1	3–3	4–1	0–1	3–1	2–3	5–0	0–1	2–1	0–0	3–1	2–0
Bristol City	0–1	2–1	3–0	2–1		2–0	1–1	0–1	2–1	2–0	1–0	4–1	2–0	1–0	2–0	2–2	5–0	3–0	5–0	0–0	0–0	1–1
Bristol Rovers	1–0	1–0	2–0	1–2	0–0		4–0	0–1	0–0	1–1	1–0	1–1	0–1	0–2	3–0	1–1	3–0	1–0	1–3	3–0	0–1	2–0
Charlton Athletic	5–1	2–2	3–0	1–0	0–1	1–1		1–0	2–0	2–0	3–0	0–2	1–0	0–0	3–2	2–1	2–0	1–2	0–0	0–0	1–0	1–1
Exeter City	3–1	2–1	5–1	2–0	0–2	1–1	2–1		3–3	0–1	2–1	0–0	4–3	0–0	1–0	3–0	1–3	1–0	0–1	2–0	1–0	4–0
Gillingham	2–0	0–0	1–0	2–0	1–1	0–0	2–0	1–1		4–1	2–1	1–0	1–0	0–1	3–1	0–3	1–0	0–0	3–1	0–0	1–1	0–0
Luton Town	0–0	0–2	3–1	3–1	3–0	1–1	1–0	1–1	0–0		6–0	1–1	2–2	2–0	0–0	1–1	3–0	1–0	4–0	0–0	2–2	0–3
Merthyr Town	3–1	3–1	4–0	1–2	2–3	1–0	2–1	0–1	0–0	0–0		2–1	1–0	0–2	0–2	1–2	2–3	0–0	1–0	0–2	1–5	0–1
Millwall	2–1	3–1	3–0	1–1	3–1	0–0	1–0	2–0	2–0	2–2	3–1		3–0	3–1	0–0	0–0	3–0	0–1	2–0	1–2	1–2	0–1
Newport County	1–0	2–0	1–0	0–0	0–2	4–1	2–1	2–1	2–0	1–1	3–0	2–3		1–0	3–0	0–0	0–0	1–1	1–1	3–0	3–1	3–0
Northampton Town	5–0	3–0	0–2	1–0	1–2	5–0	2–1	2–1	1–0	1–0	2–0	0–2	0–2		1–1	5–2	1–0	2–0	0–1	1–3	0–0	1–1
Norwich City	1–1	6–3	3–0	2–2	0–0	1–1	2–1	0–1	0–0	1–1	1–0	2–2	2–1	4–0		1–1	5–0	0–2	0–1	2–0	4–0	2–1
Plymouth Argyle	2–0	2–0	7–1	1–0	7–1	3–2	3–2	1–1	2–0	4–0	2–0	1–1	0–2	2–1	5–0		1–0	2–0	6–0	1–1	2–0	1–0
Queens Park Rangers	4–1	0–2	1–0	2–0	3–0	1–2	0–0	1–4	1–1	2–1	1–1	0–0	4–3	2–0	1–2	0–1		1–0	3–1	0–0	1–0	0–0
Reading	2–0	0–1	3–1	0–0	0–1	4–1	0–0	1–1	0–1	3–0	2–1	1–2	0–1	0–1	2–0	0–0	2–1		2–2	2–0	1–1	3–0
Southend United	2–1	3–0	6–1	2–0	2–0	2–1	0–3	3–0	4–0	2–1	2–1	1–0	0–1	0–1	0–1	0–3	1–0	3–0		1–0	0–0	0–4
Swansea Town	2–2	1–0	7–0	1–0	1–1	2–2	6–1	2–1	2–0	4–1	2–0	2–2	1–0	2–1	2–0	2–0	2–0	1–0	4–0		2–0	3–1
Swindon Town	2–0	4–0	2–0	3–0	3–0	3–0	2–2	1–0	2–0	4–1	5–1	1–0	2–2	5–0	1–0	1–0	5–3	2–1	3–0	0–2		0–1
Watford	0–0	2–1	3–1	0–1	1–0	1–0	0–0	3–0	1–2	1–1	3–1	1–0	0–5	1–0	0–2	1–0	1–0	1–0	0–3	1–3	1–0	

Updated to match(es) played on unknown. Source: Ian Laschke: Rothmans Book of Football League Records 1888–89 to 1978–79. Macdonald and Jane’s, London & Sydney, 1980.
Legend: Blue = home team win; Yellow = draw; Red = away team win.

=== Maps ===
Locations of the Football League Third Division South teams
Locations of the Football League Third Division South London teams

== Attendances ==
=== Division One ===
No.	Club	Average
1	Arsenal FC	29,485
2	Liverpool FC	29,185
3	Tottenham Hotspur FC	28,195
4	Aston Villa FC	27,965
5	Manchester City FC	26,915
6	Everton FC	26,030
7	Newcastle United FC	24,325
8	Bolton Wanderers FC	22,935
9	Birmingham City FC	22,780
10	Leeds United FC	22,715
11	Cardiff City FC	21,630
12	West Bromwich Albion FC	21,115
13	Sheffield United FC	20,970
14	West Ham United FC	20,885
15	Sunderland AFC	20,440
16	Bury FC	19,500
17	Huddersfield Town AFC	17,670
18	Blackburn Rovers FC	16,340
19	Burnley FC	15,890
20	Preston North End FC	15,630
21	Notts County FC	13,350
22	Nottingham Forest FC	11,450

== See also ==
- 1924–25 in English football
- 1924 in association football
- 1925 in association football
