= Wilf Chadwick =

English footballer

Personal information
- Full name: Wilfred Chadwick
- Date of birth: 7 October 1900
- Place of birth: Bury, England
- Date of death: 14 February 1973 (aged 72)
- Place of death: Bury, England
- Height: 5 ft 9 in (1.75 m)
- Position: Inside forward

Youth career
- –: Bury

Senior career*
Years	Team	Apps	(Gls)
1920–1921	Nelson		
1920–1922	Rossendale United	44	(49)
1922–1925	Everton	102	(50)
1925–1926	Leeds United	16	(3)
1926–1929	Wolverhampton Wanderers	97	(44)
1929–1930	Stoke City	7	(2)
1930–1932	Halifax Town	5	(0)
Total		227	(99)
- * Club domestic league appearances and goals

Wilfred Chadwick (7 October 1900 – 14 February 1973) was an English footballer who played in the Football League for Everton, Halifax Town, Leeds United, Stoke City and Wolverhampton Wanderers.

== Career ==
Chadwick began his Football League career when he joined Everton in February 1922 from Rossendale Utd for a fee of £340. He made his debut on 4 March 1922, scoring both goals in a 2–0 win over Bradford City. He was the club's (joint) leading scorer the following season, and in 1923–24 was the leading scorer in the First Division with 28 goals.

He moved to Leeds United in November 1925, where he failed to become a regular player, and soon left to join Wolverhampton Wanderers in August 1926. He scored on his club debut, a 2–1 defeat to Middlesbrough on 25 September 1926, and finished his season with 12 goals. He was Wolves' leading goalscorer in 1927–28, with 19 goals, and added a further 13 in the next campaign.

He was transferred to Stoke City in May 1929 for £250. He played seven matches for Stoke in 1929–30 scoring twice. He ended his league career at Halifax Town from October 1930 to May 1932.

== Career statistics ==
Appearances and goals by club, season and competition
Club	Season	League			FA Cup		Total	
Club	Season	Division	Apps	Goals	Apps	Goals	Apps	Goals
Everton	1921–22	First Division	4	3	0	0	4	3
Everton	1922–23	First Division	27	13	1	0	28	13
Everton	1923–24	First Division	42	28	2	2	44	30
Everton	1924–25	First Division	27	6	4	3	31	9
Everton	1925–26	First Division	2	0	0	0	2	0
Everton	Total		102	50	7	5	109	55
Leeds United	1925–26	First Division	14	3	0	0	14	3
Leeds United	1926–27	First Division	2	0	0	0	2	0
Leeds United	Total		16	3	0	0	16	3
Wolverhampton Wanderers	1926–27	Second Division	30	12	2	0	32	12
Wolverhampton Wanderers	1927–28	Second Division	33	19	2	0	35	19
Wolverhampton Wanderers	1928–29	Second Division	34	13	0	0	34	13
Wolverhampton Wanderers	Total		97	44	4	0	101	44
Stoke City	1929–30	Second Division	7	2	1	0	8	2
Halifax Town	1930–31	Third Division North	5	0	1	0	6	0
Career Total			227	99	13	5	240	104
