= Daniel A. McGowan =

Daniel A. McGowan is the executive director of Deir Yassin Remembered, an organization seeking to build a memorial in Deir Yassin, a former Palestinian-Arab village near Jerusalem, to commemorate the massacre there on April 9, 1948, in which 107 or more villagers were killed by forces from the Irgun and Lehi paramilitary groups.

Deir Yassin Remembered has been classified as an "active Holocaust denial hate group" by the Southern Poverty Law Center. The group was denounced by Jeremy Corbyn's campaign after Corbyn's attendance at some Deir Yassin Remembered programs was revealed.

McGowan wrote the foreword to Holocaust denier Germar Rudolf's Resistance is Obligatory, published by the Barnes Review. Although McGowan has denied charges of being a Holocaust denier, he has expressed doubts about the number of Jews killed, suggesting that the death toll was instead between three million and six million and that many of the victims died from natural causes.

McGowan is professor emeritus of economics at Hobart and William Smith Colleges. He is a columnist for Counterpunch, and the co-author, with Marc H. Ellis, of Remembering Deir Yassin: The Future of Israel and Palestine (1998). He also runs an organization called Righteous Jews, a play on the phrase righteous gentiles, for Jews willing to defend the rights of the Palestinians.

== See also ==
- Deir Yassin massacre
- Holocaust denial
