= Bill Roost =

English footballer

Personal information
- Full name: William Charles Roost
- Date of birth: 22 March 1924
- Place of birth: Bristol, England
- Date of death: 10 February 2013 (aged 88)
- Height: 5 ft 9 in (1.75 m)
- Position: Inside forward

Senior career*
Years	Team	Apps	(Gls)
1948–1948	Stonehouse		
1948–1957	Bristol Rovers	177	(49)
1957–1959	Swindon Town	18	(3)
1960–1963	Minehead		
Total		195	(52)
- * Club domestic league appearances and goals

William Charles Roost (22 March 1924 – 10 February 2013) was a professional footballer who played as an inside forward in The Football League for Bristol Rovers and Swindon Town.

Roost's footballing career had a late start, due to the Second World War, eventually making his League debut in 1948 at the age of 24. He previously played for Stonehouse in Gloucestershire where he was spotted by a Bristol Rovers scout, and he joined Rovers initially as an amateur on 10 September. He was awarded his first professional contract after less than two weeks in Bristol, signing on 23 September.

After making 177 League appearances for Rovers and scoring 49 goals he moved to Swindon Town in 1957, but he played just eighteen League games for them in two years and scored only three goals, all coming in a single game against Shrewsbury Town in December 1957. After an unsuccessful trial with Yeovil Town in 1959 he joined non-League side Minehead in January 1960 for whom he played 90 times in all competitions and scored 21 times before retiring in 1963.

Following his retirement from football he worked as a foreman in a scaffolding yard, and lived in the Whitehall area of Bristol.
