= Danny McGowan =

Irish footballer

Personal information
- Full name: Daniel McGowan
- Date of birth: 8 November 1924
- Place of birth: Dublin, Ireland
- Date of death: 25 April 1994 (aged 69)
- Positions: Wing half; inside forward

Senior career*
Years	Team	Apps	(Gls)
1946–1948	Shelbourne		
1948–1954	West Ham United	81	(8)
1954–1955	Chelmsford City		
1955–1956	Folkestone Town		

International career
1949	Ireland	3	(0)
- * Club domestic league appearances and goals as of 12 January 2010

Daniel McGowan (8 November 1924 – 25 April 1994) was an Irish footballer who played in the Football League for West Ham United.

McGowan moved from League of Ireland club Shelbourne to West Ham United in 1948, following a recommendation from Shels manager Charlie Turner, who had played for the Hammers before the war. He played as an inside forward, later converting to wing half. There, he joined an Irish contingent of players that included Tommy Moroney and Frank O'Farrell, who had been recruited from Cork United.

McGowan played 88 times for The Hammers, scoring 9 goals, before moving to Southern League club Chelmsford City in 1954. After a season, he moved on to Folkestone Town of the Kent League.

He made three international appearances for the Republic of Ireland national football team, all games in 1949.

After his retirement from football, he worked at the London Electricity Board for 22 years. He died in 1994 after suffering from Parkinson's disease. His funeral took place in Canning Town and was attended by former teammate John Dick.
