= List of Brentford F.C. players (25–99 appearances) =

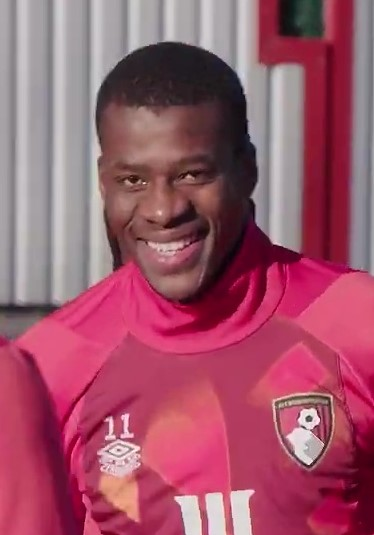
Current first team right winger Dango Ouattara is the most recent player to reach 25 appearances for Brentford.

Brentford Football Club is an English professional football club based in Brentford, Hounslow, London. Between 1897 and 1920, the first team competed in the London League, Southern League and Western League. Since 1920, the first team has competed in the Football League, the Premier League and other nationally and internationally organised competitions. All players who have played between 25 and 99 such matches are listed below.

== Records and notable players ==
Jeff Taylor finished his Brentford career on 98 appearances. John Dick is the highest scorer on this list, with 48 goals from 83 appearances. Current Brentford players who have made between 25 and 99 appearances are Sepp van den Berg, Aaron Hickey, Michael Kayode, Caoimhín Kelleher, Dango Ouattara and Igor Thiago.

== Key ==
- Appearance and goal totals include matches in the Premier League, Football League, Southern League, London League (1896–1898), FA Cup, League Cup, Football League Trophy, Anglo-Italian Cup, London Challenge Cup, Middlesex Senior Cup, London Junior Cup, Middlesex Junior Cup, West Middlesex Cup, Southern Floodlit Challenge Cup, Football League Jubilee Fund and Empire Exhibition Cup. Substitute appearances are included. Wartime matches are regarded as unofficial and are excluded.
- "Brentford career" corresponds to the year(s) in which the player made their first and last appearances.
- Players listed in **bold** won full international caps whilst with the club.
- Statistics are correct as of match played 17 October 2026.
- Starting lineups are untraced prior to the beginning of the 1893–94 season.

=== Playing positions ===
GK	Goalkeeper	RB	Right back	RW	Right winger	DF	Defender	HB	Half back	IF	Inside forward	DM	Defensive midfielder
OL	Outside left	LB	Left back	LW	Left winger	CB	Centre back	FW	Forward	FB	Full back	RM	Right midfielder
W	Winger	MF	Midfielder	ST	Striker	WH	Wing half	AM	Attacking midfielder	CM	Central midfielder	LM	Left midfielder
U	Utility player	OR	Outside right	SW	Sweeper	LH	Left half	RH	Right half				

Symbol	Meaning
‡	Brentford player in the 2026–27 season.
*	Player has left Brentford but is still playing in a professional league.
♦	Player went on to manage the club.
(c)	Player captained the club.

== Players ==
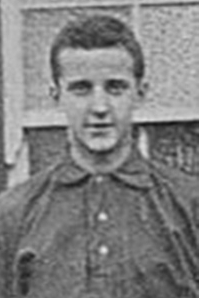
Scottish half back Arthur Charlton was described as "probably the club's first great player" for his six years with Brentford in the 1890s.

Forward Oakey Field scored 40 goals in 36 appearances in the late 19th century.

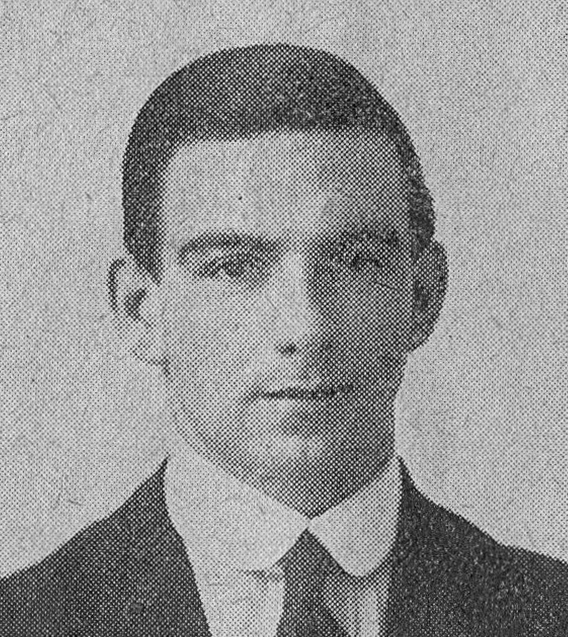
The first New Zealander to play for Brentford, Reginald Boyne scored 23 goals in 50 appearances during the first two seasons of competitive football following the First World War.

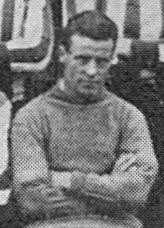
Outside left Jack Cartmell made 66 appearances between 1919 and 1921 and later gave the club nearly 30 years' service as a trainer.

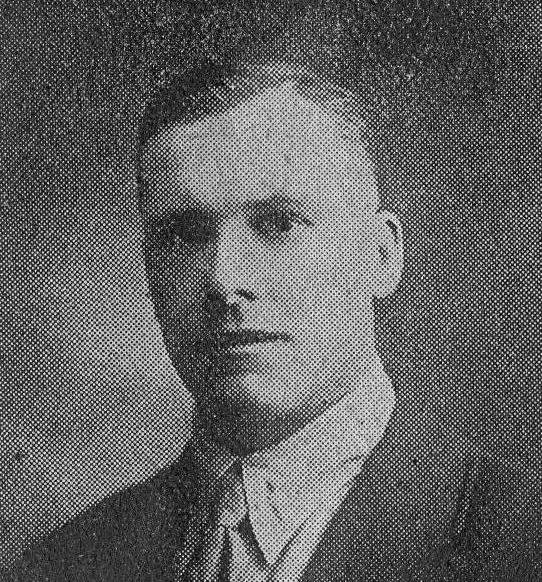
In May 1921, full back Jimmy Hodson became the oldest player to represent Brentford in a Football League match, aged 40 years, 8 months, 2 days.

Harry King was the leading goalscorer in the club's debut season in the Football League and the first Brentford player to score a league hat-trick.

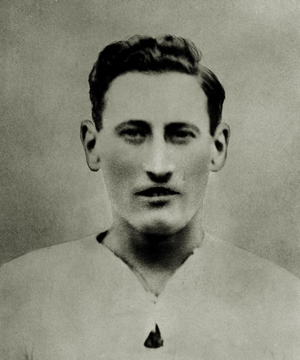
Harry Morris' 30 goals in 63 appearances were a rare cause for cheer during Brentford's early seasons in the Football League.

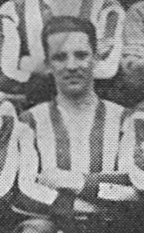
One of the most prolific goalscorers in Brentford history, Jack Phillips scored 22 goals in 29 appearances before being sold in September 1928.

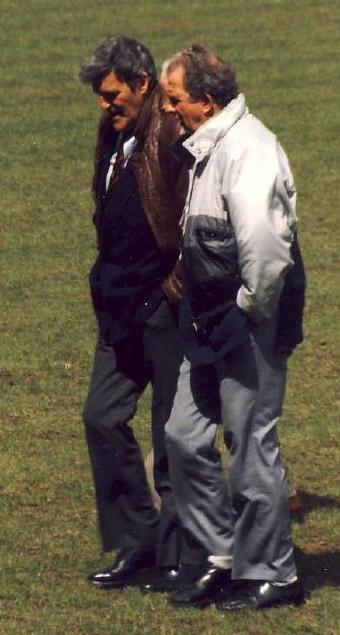
Jimmy Hill (seen left) began his professional playing career with Brentford and later became a manager and a broadcaster.

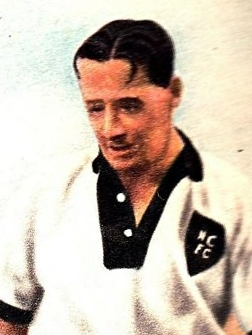
Former England international forward Tommy Lawton served as the Brentford's player-manager between January and September 1953.

Scottish wing half Matt Crowe was a vital cog in Brentford's midfield between 1962 and 1964.

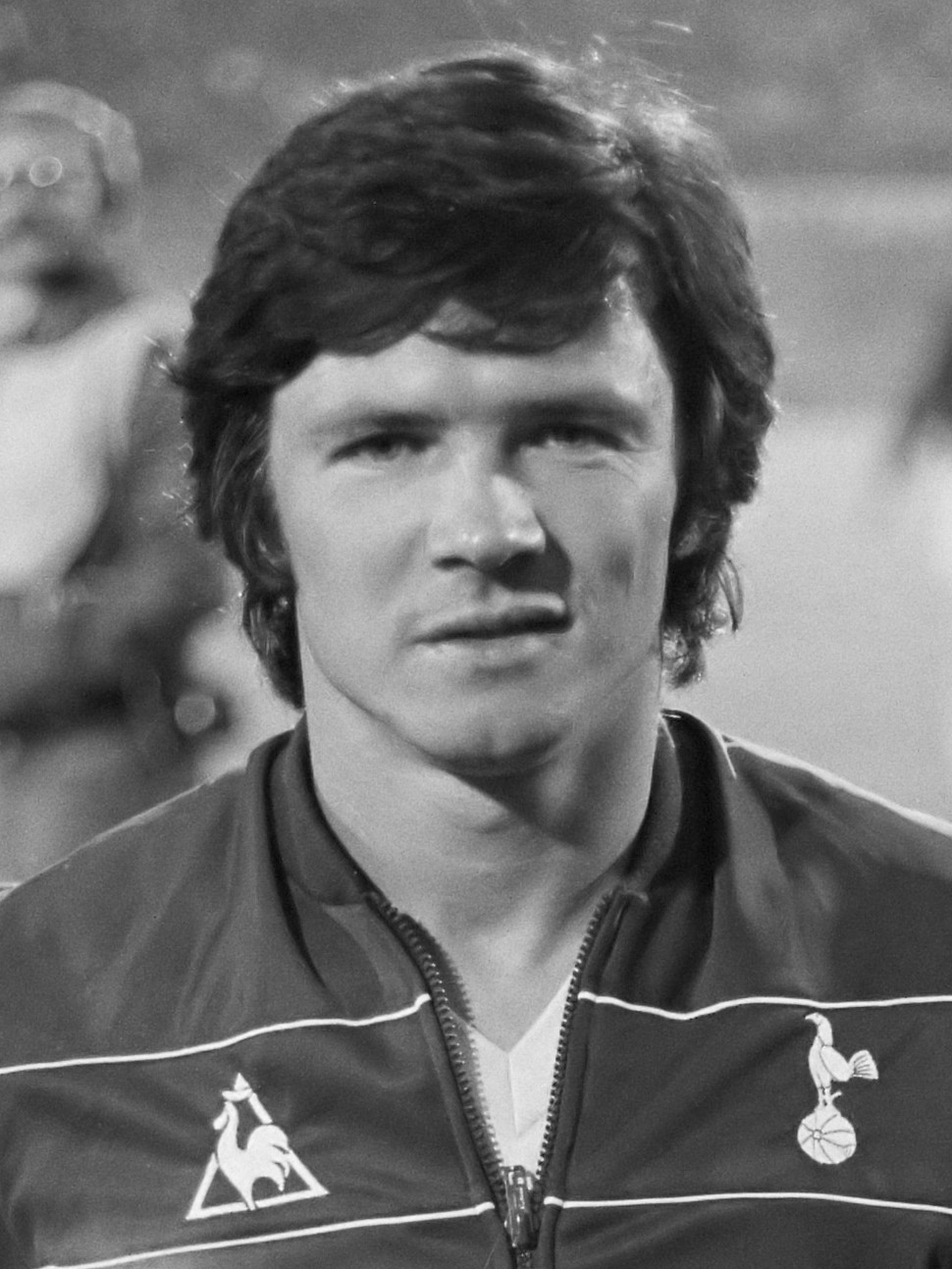
Former England international Steve Perryman joined in 1986 and soon took over as player-manager.

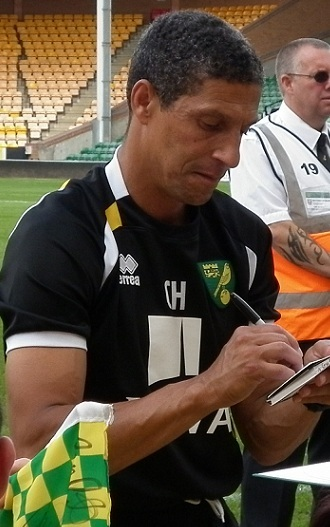
Former Republic of Ireland international Chris Hughton was a part of Brentford's 1991–92 Third Division title-winning team.

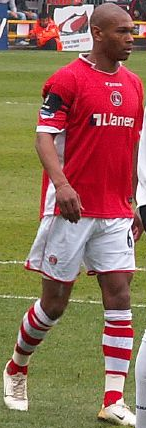
Brentford's most successful youth product of the 1990s, Marcus Bent made 91 appearances, was capped by England U21 and played for eight Premier League clubs.

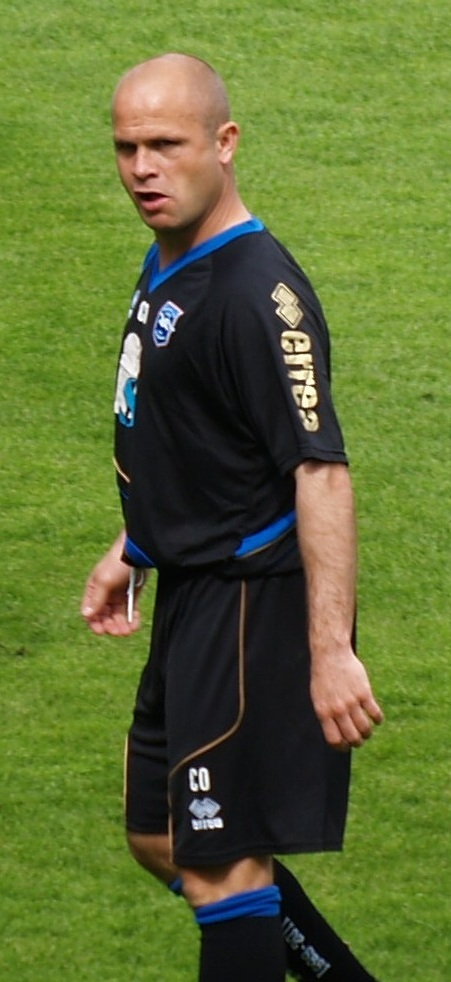
A ball-winning midfielder, Charlie Oatway made 65 appearances and was a member of the club's 1998–99 Third Division title-winning squad.

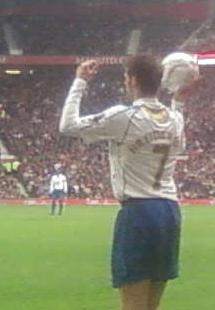
Signed for a club record fee, Hermann Hreiðarsson was named in the 1998–99 Third Division PFA Team of the Year and later played for five Premier League clubs.

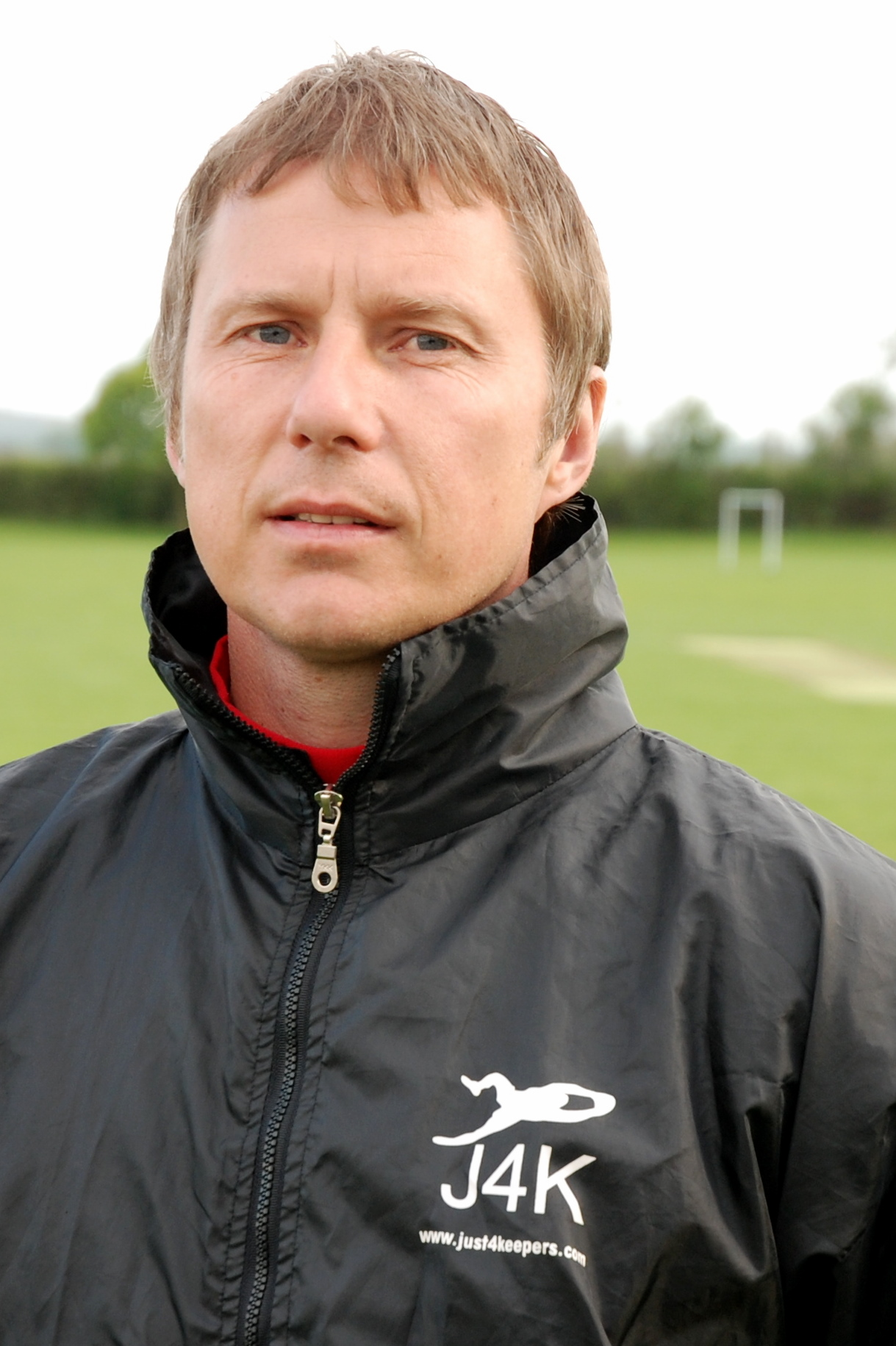
Jason Pearcey kept goal in 30 matches between 1998 and 2000, when a serious leg injury forced his retirement from professional play.

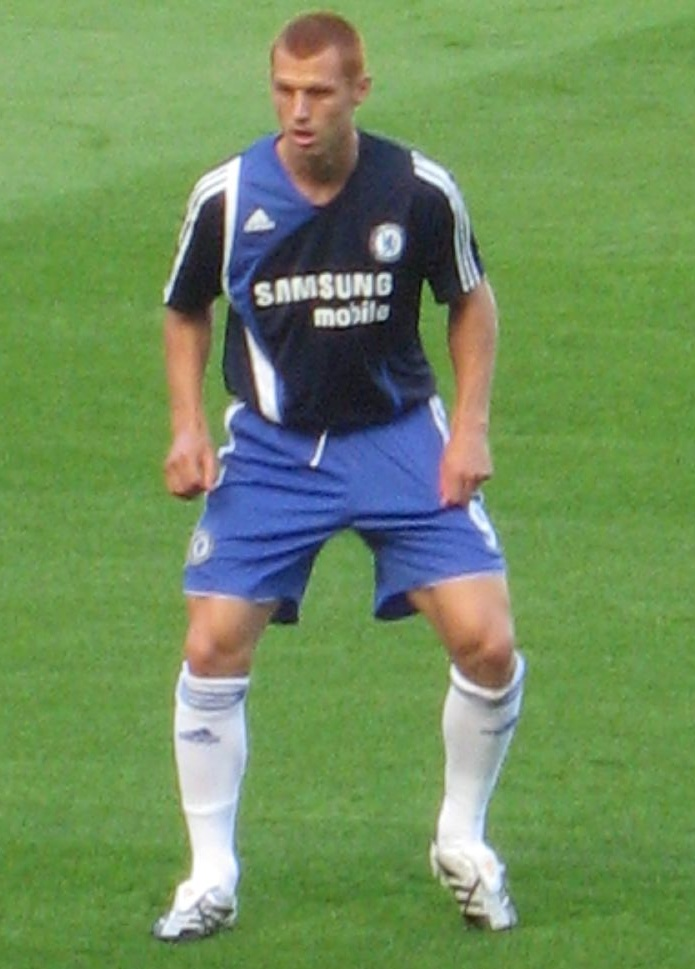
Steve Sidwell was signed on loan from Arsenal in October 2001, to boost Brentford's Second Division promotion charge.

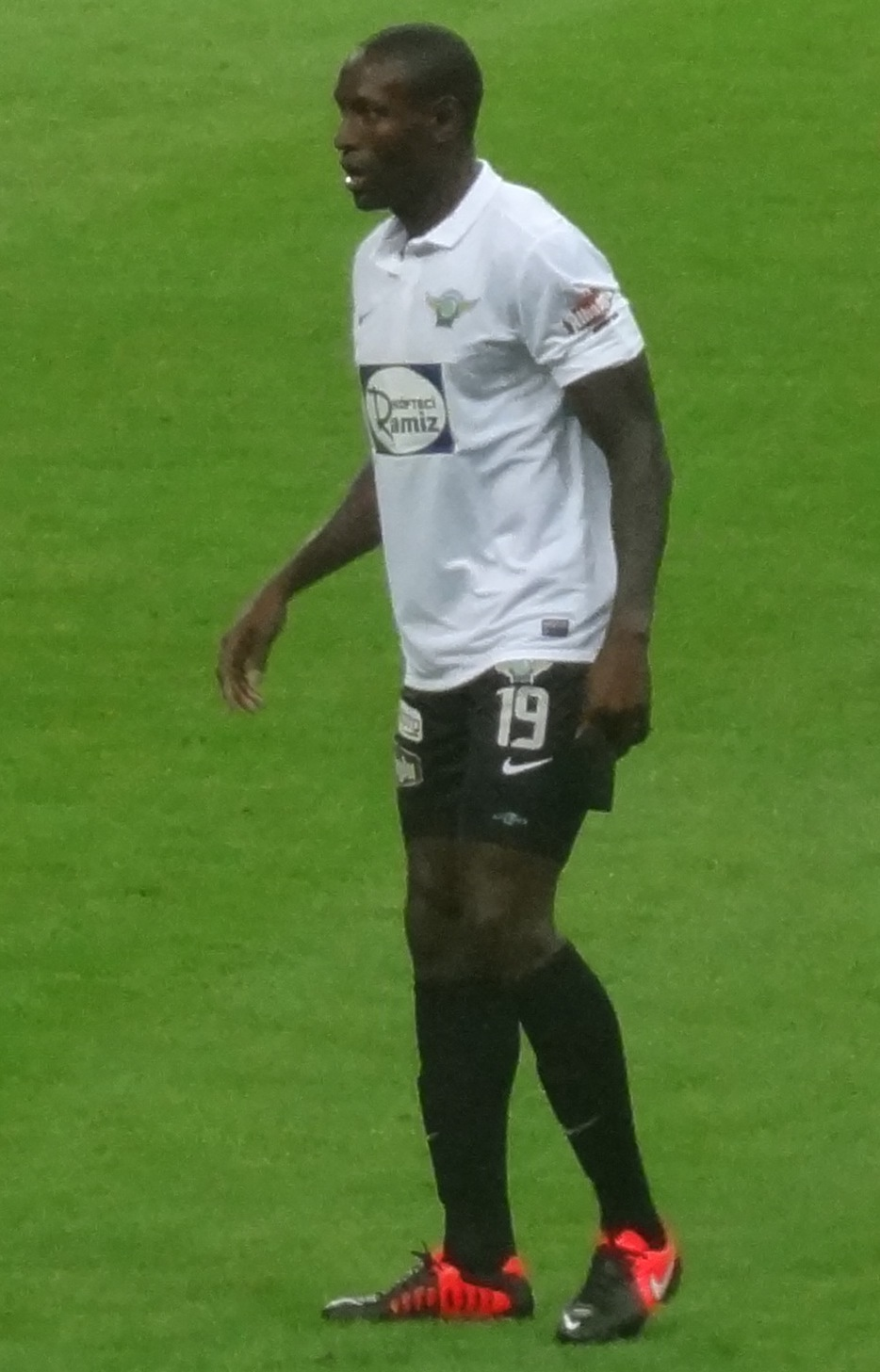
A fan-favourite, Brentford was the first of Senegalese central defender Ibrahima Sonko's six English clubs.

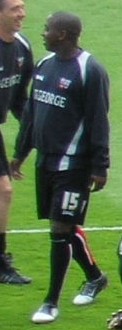
A hard-working attacking player, Isaiah Rankin scored a memorable goal away to Southampton in the fifth round of the 2004–05 FA Cup.

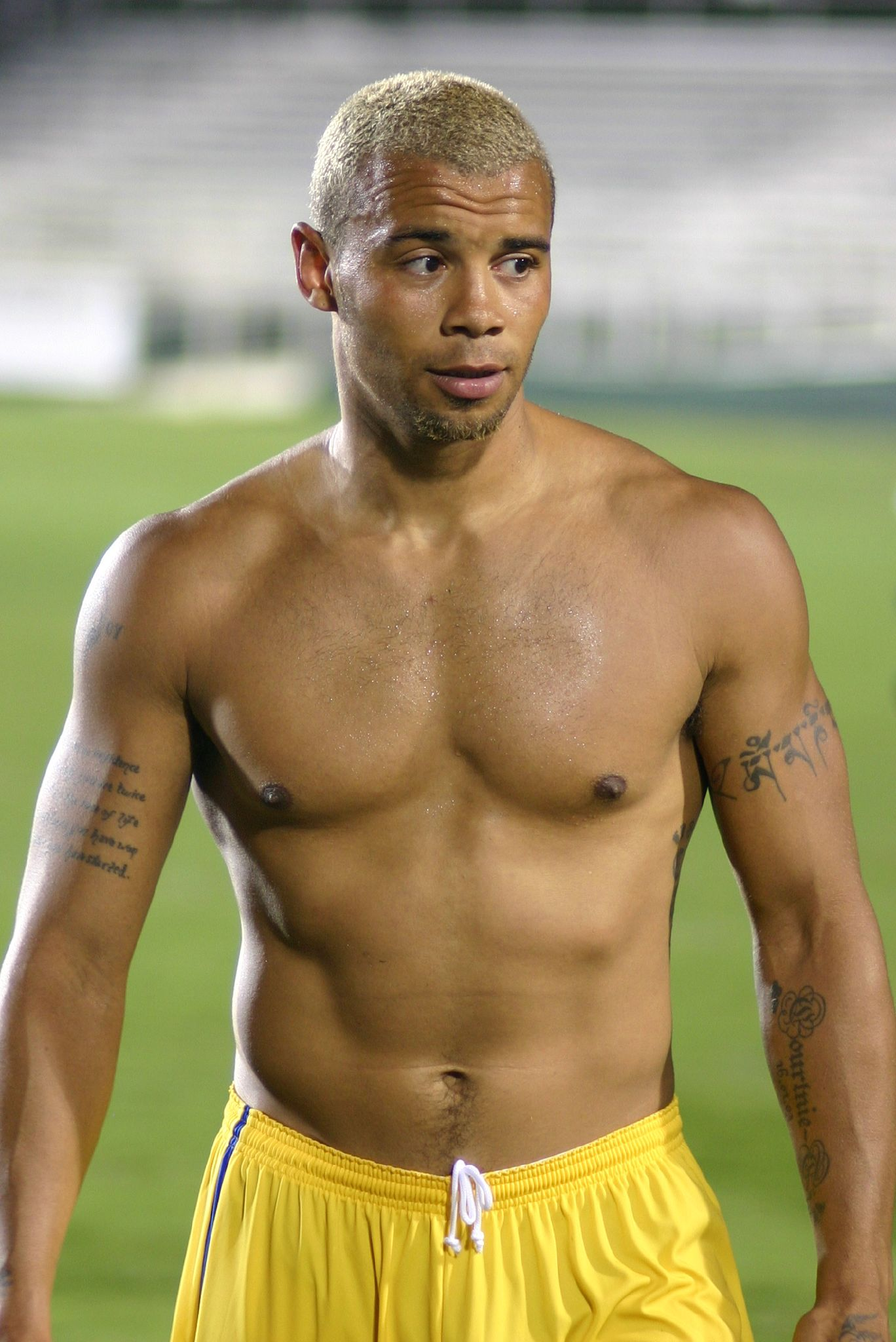
Deon Burton was top-scorer during his only season at Griffin Park in 2004–05.

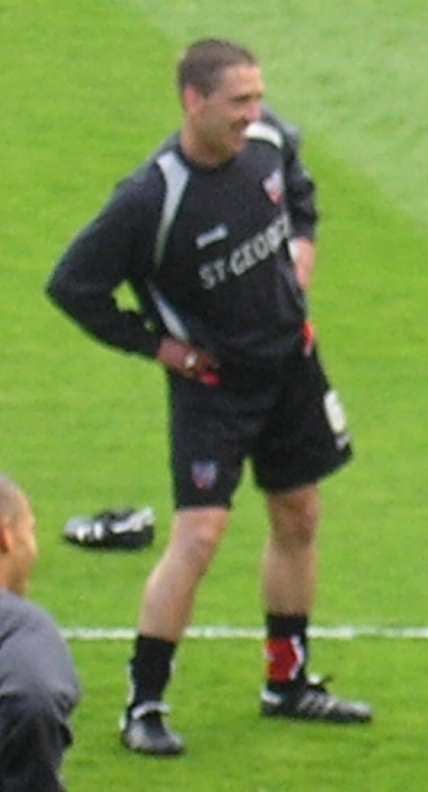
A former Premier League player with Crystal Palace, Ricky Newman captained Brentford to the 2006 League One playoff semi-finals.

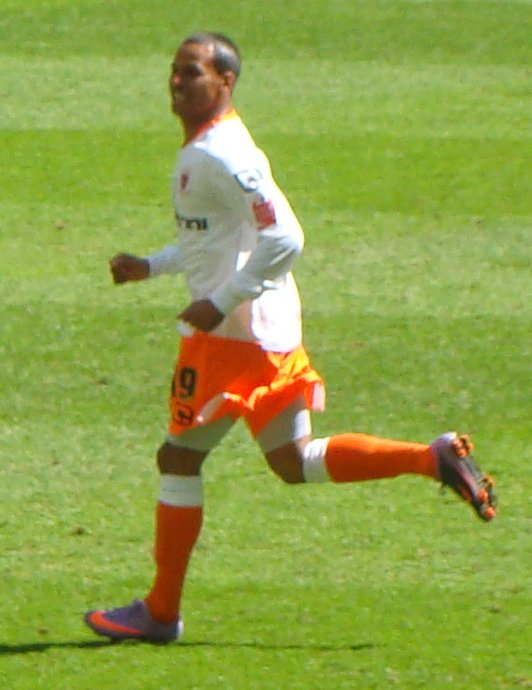
Signed from non-League Yeading, DJ Campbell earned a move to the Premier League after a run of 8 goals in 6 games in January 2006.

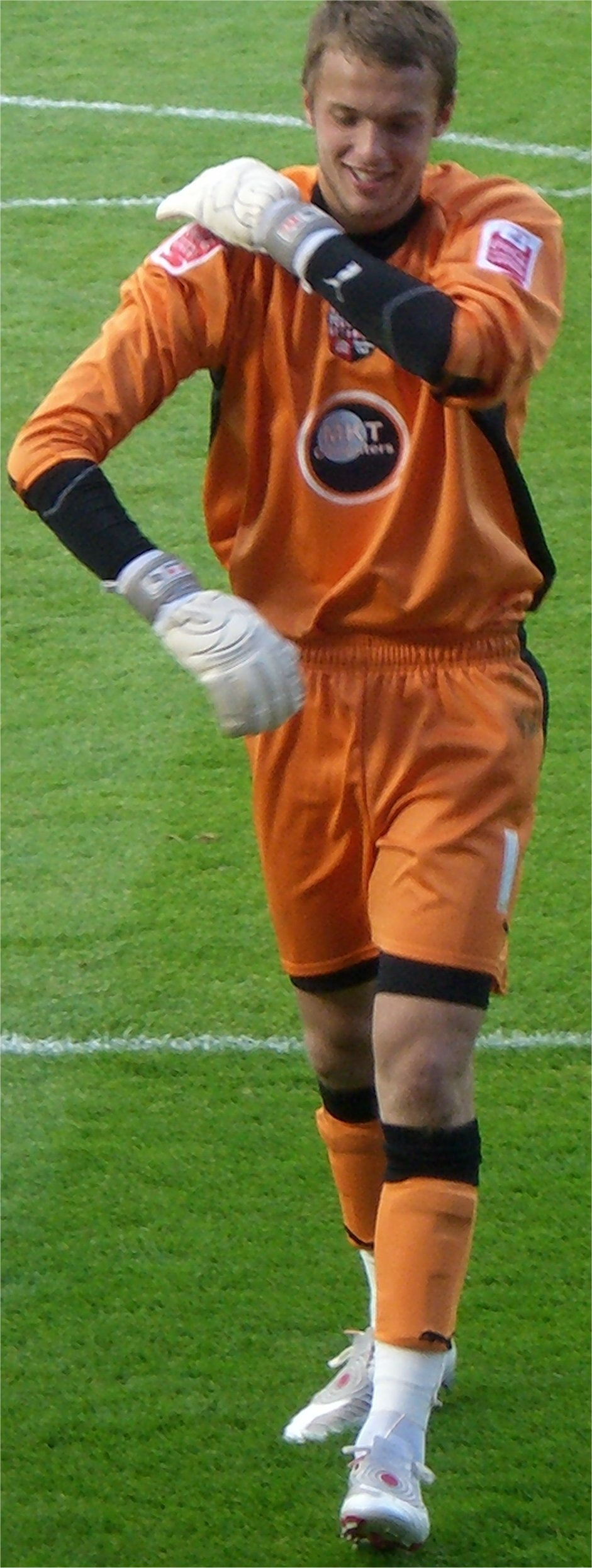
Ben Hamer made 80 appearances across four spells on loan from Reading, a club record for a loanee.

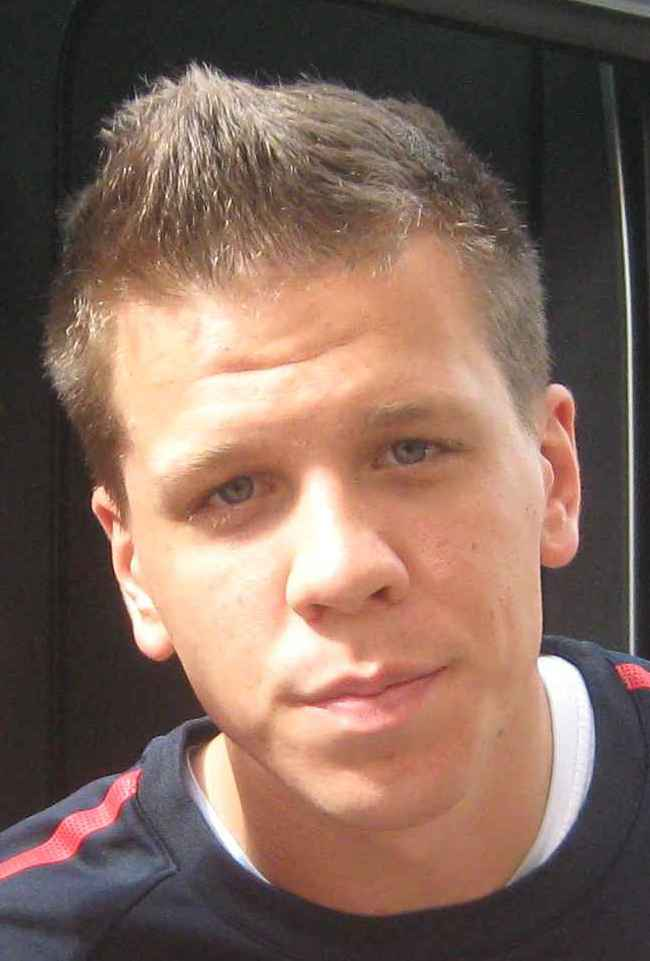
Then-Arsenal goalkeeper Wojciech Szczęsny gained experience on loan at Brentford during the 2009–10 season, making 28 appearances.

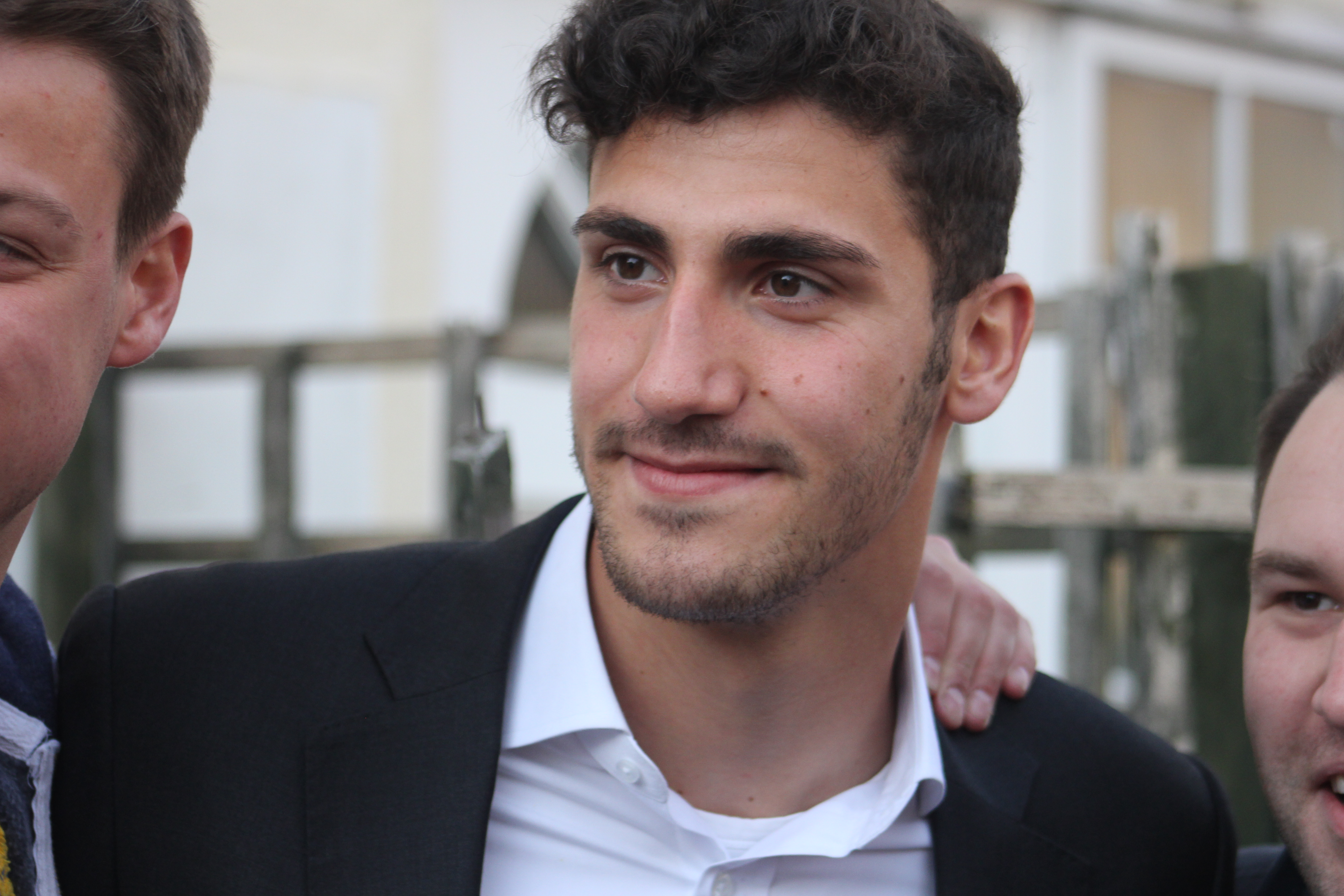
Marcello Trotta scored 22 goals in 69 appearances across two spells on loan from Fulham.

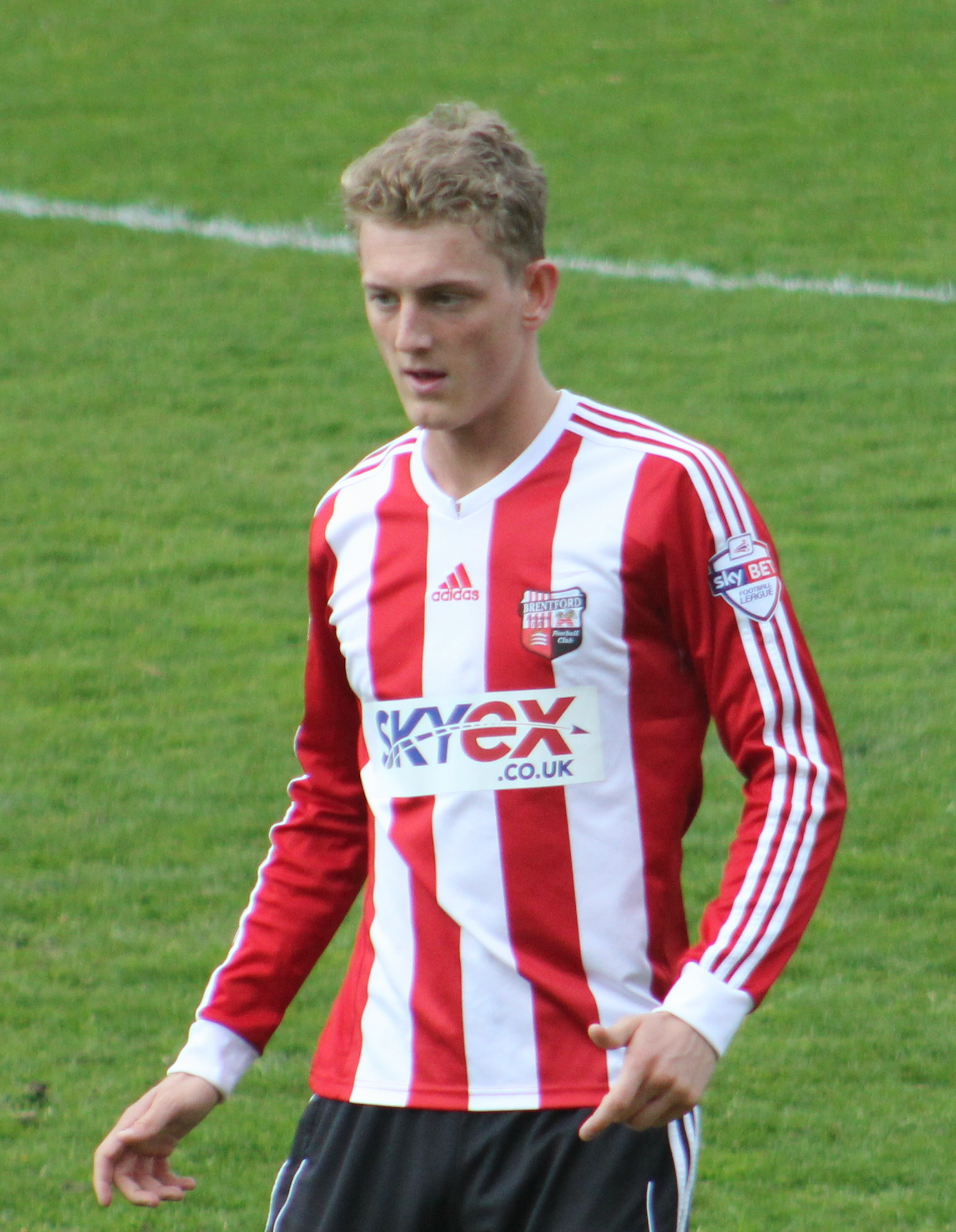
George Saville spent the 2013–14 season on loan at Griffin Park from neighbours Chelsea and won a League One runners-up medal.

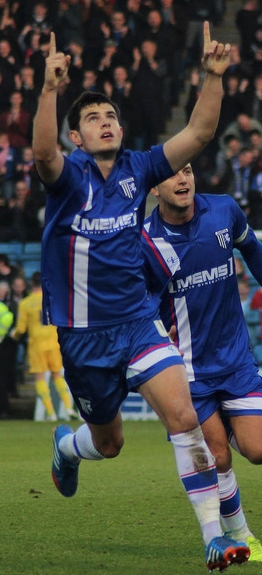
Central defender John Egan made 71 appearances, scored seven goals, captained the club and was capped by the Republic of Ireland before his departure in July 2018.

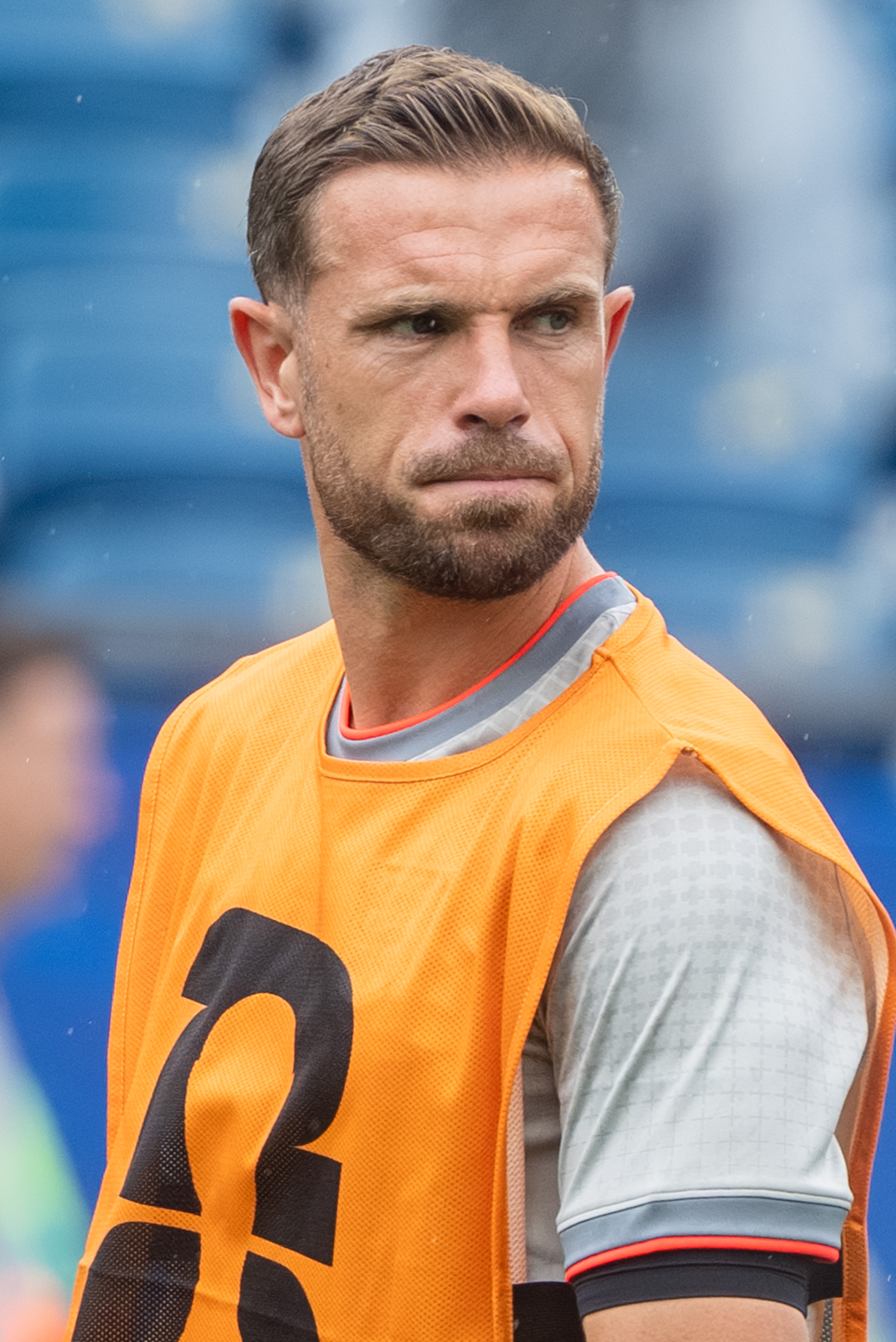
Defensive midfielder Jordan Henderson was the second Brentford player to be capped by England in the 21st century.

=== Early years (1889–1898) ===
Name	Nationality	Position	Brentford career	Appearances	Goals	Notes	Ref
Arthur Charlton (c)	Scotland	U	1893–1898	68	13	(Note: Member of the Brentford Hall of Fame.) (Note: Some appearance and goal records are untraced during the seasons in which the player played.)	
Jack Foster	England	GK	1893–1897	45	0		
H. James	n/a	LB	1893–1896	29	2		
Jimmy Ray	n/a	HB	1893–1896	28	0		
Billy Steers	England	FW	1893–1898	25	5		
Tommy Stevenson	n/a	OL	1893–1896	28	9		
Archie Williams	England	U	1893–1899	47	9		
Richard Dailley (c)	England	OR/HB	1895–1900	93	22		
Herbert Edney (c)	England	CH	1895–1900	54	1		
Charles Gillett	England	GK	1895–1899	31	0		
Percy Swann	England	RB	1895–1899; 1900	51	5		
Oakey Field	England	IL/OL	1896–1898	36	40	(Note: Field re-signed with the club in November 1907, but did not make a first team appearance before retiring at the end of the 1907–08 season.)	
Ernest Booth	England	CF	1897–1899	42	22		
Thomas Knapman	England	FW	1897–1900	53	18		
Alfred Lugg (c)	England	FB	1897–1899	51	0		
John Richardson	England	IF	1897–1900	38	9		
Alfred Mattocks	England	HB/FW	1898–1901	55	1		

=== Southern League era (1898–1920) ===
Name	Nationality	Position	Brentford career	Appearances	Goals	Notes	Ref
Charlie Evans	n/a	FW	1898–1900	25	5		
Billy Smith	England	FB/HB	1898–1900	26	0		
E. W. Andrews	England	OL	1899–1902	75	21		
Frederick Broughton	England	HB/FW	1899–1901	35	2		
Harry Gilmour	Scotland	FB	1900–1902	36	0		
Ralph McElhaney (c)	Scotland	U	1900–1902	49	13		
Peter Turnbull	Scotland	CF	1900–1901	25	17		
Charlie McEleny	Ireland	RH	1901–1902	30	1		
Bill Regan	England	WH	1901–1903	54	7		
David Robson	Scotland	FB	1901–1902	33	0		
Tommy Spicer	England	GK	1901–1904; 1905–1906	59	0		
Robert Stormont (c)	Scotland	CF	1901–1902	25	1		
Alf Gilson	England	RB	1902–1903; 1907	29	0		
Ellis Green (c)	England	CH	1902–1903	27	0		
Davie Maher	England	OR/IR	1902–1903	38	3		
Fred Nidd	England	FB	1902–1903	33	0		
Percy Turner	England	IF	1902–1903	41	2		
Tommy Atherton	England	OR	1903–1904	27	2	(Note: On loan from Grimsby Town.)	
Lawrence Bell	Scotland	FW	1903–1904	28	4		
James Bellingham	Scotland	HB/FB	1903–1905; 1906	47	1		
Dave Buchanan	Scotland	RH	1903–1904	33	6		
Alex Caie	Scotland	HB	1903–1904	25	0		
Tommy Davidson (c)	Scotland	FB	1903–1904	42	1		
Fred Hobson	England	FW	1904–1906	56	11		
Thomas Howarth	England	FB	1904–1906	36	0		
Joe Warrington	England	OR	1904–1905	33	4		
Walter Whittaker	England	GK	1904–1906	70	0		
Jimmy Hartley	Scotland	IF	1905–1906	27	5		
Tom Riley	England	FB	1905–1906	33	0		
Patrick Hagan	Scotland	FW	1906–1908	55	11		
Tom McAllister	Scotland	RH	1906–1908	68	10		
Fred Pentland	England	OR	1906–1907	39	12		
Archie Taylor	Scotland	FB	1906–1907	32	0		
Charlie Williams	England	GK	1906–1908	63	0		
Adam Bowman	Scotland	IL/CF	1907–1908; 1909	44	25		
Norman Brown	England	OR	1907–1908	26	1		
Andy Clark	Scotland	LB	1907–1908	25	0		
Bert Badger	England	WH	1908–1909; 1910–1911	54	1		
Fred Connelly	England	IL	1908–1909	34	12		
Dave Ewing	England	FB	1908–1909	34	0		
Willie McIver	England	GK	1908–1909	42	2		
Joe Ryalls	England	OR	1908–1909; 1910–1911	78	3		
Sidney Sugden	England	FW	1908–1909	32	9		
George Anderson	England	OL	1909–1912	88	6		
Albert Bartlett	England	FW	1909–1911	74	7		
Bert Hollinrake	England	FW	1909–1911	49	12		
James Riley	England	HB	1909–1910	30	1		
George Kennedy	Scotland	LH	1910–1913	78	2		
Jack Sibbald	England	FW	1910–1913	94	21		
Billy Brawn	England	IR	1911–1913	77	8		
William Hickleton	England	HB/FB	1911–1913	36	1	(Note: On loan from Coventry City.)	
Willis Rippon	England	CF	1911–1912	29	17		
Frank Bentley	England	HB	1912–1914	64	0		
Frederick Chapple	England	IF	1912–1913	30	11		
Bob McTavish	Scotland	IL	1912–1913	40	7		
Bill Smith	England	CF	1912–1913	27	12		
Jack Chapman	England	FW	1913–1914	30	17		
Bobby Jackson	England	HB	1913–1914	28	3		
Joe Johnson	England	FW	1913–1915	44	17		
Tom McGovern	Ireland	WH	1913–1920	67	2		
Henry Simons	England	FW	1913–1914	28	19		
Reginald Boyne	New Zealand	CF	1919–1921	50	23		
Jack Cartmell	England	OL	1919–1921	66	2		
Jack Durston	England	GK	1919–1921	45	0		
Jimmy Hodson	England	FB	1919–1921	69	0		
Fred Morley	England	IF	1919–1921	50	8		
Sam Morris	England	WH	1919–1921	64	0		
Alfred Thompson	England	IF	1919–1921	44	10		

=== Interwar era (1920–1945) ===
Name	Nationality	Position	Brentford career	Appearances	Goals	Notes
Harry Anstiss	England	IF	1920–1922	44	19	
Samuel Challinor	England	WH	1920–1921	32	2	
Jimmy Elliott	England	RH	1920–1922	69	2	
Harry King	England	CF	1920–1921	34	18	
Thomas Elliott	England	FW	1921–1923	55	9	
Cyril Hunter	England	CH	1921–1924	81	2	
James Kerr	Scotland	WH	1921–1924	91	1	
Harry Morris	England	CF	1921–1923	63	30	
Billy Clayson	England	IR	1922–1925	86	19	
Bill Inglis	England	HB/FB	1922–1925	87	1	
Roland James	England	IF/RH	1922–1924	36	1	
Gordon Johnstone	England	CF/WH	1922–1924	45	7	
Horace Jones	England	WH	1922–1925	32	0	
Tom Garnish	England	OF	1923–1925	46	6	
George Kell	England	FB	1923–1925	81	0	
John Pearson	England	FB	1923–1924	30	0	
Harry Williams	England	IF	1923–1925	56	8	
Jack Allen	England	CF	1924–1927	61	28	
Alex Graham (c)	Scotland	CH	1924–1926	49	11	
Jimmy Walton	England	LH	1924–1926	61	0	
Jack Beacham	England	HB	1925–1929	69	2	
James Donnelly	Ireland	FB	1925–1928	86	1	
James McClennon	England	FB	1925–1926	26	0	
Alan Noble	England	RW/RH	1925–1927	44	0	
Harry Rae	Scotland	DF	1925–1927	76	6	
John Thomson	Scotland	GK	1925–1926	42	0	
Percival Whitton	England	FB/CF	1925–1926	27	7	
Bert Young	England	OF	1925–1926	34	2	
Bert Bellamy	England	WH	1926–1927	39	0	
Charlie Butler	England	FB	1926–1928	75	0	
Stephen Dearn (c)	England	WH	1926–1929	89	10	
James Ferguson	Scotland	GK	1926–1928	74	0	
Ted Winship	England	FB	1926–1929	92	0	
Henry Bailey	England	GK	1927–1929	45	0	
Jimmy Drinnan	Scotland	IF	1927–1929	45	12	
Albert Fletcher	England	DF	1927–1928	33	1	
Herbert Lawson	England	OF	1927–1932	64	12	
Jack Phillips	Wales	CF	1927–1928	29	22	
Freddie Fox	England	GK	1928–1930	78	0	
Baden Herod	England	FB	1928–1929	30	0	
David Sherlaw	Scotland	FW	1928–1931	36	11	
Cecil Blakemore	England	IF	1929–1931	83	28	
John Payne	England	OF	1929–1930	53	18	
Harry Salt	England	WH	1929–1932	84	0	
Edward Nash	England	GK	1930–1932	64	0	
Tom Baker	England	GK	1932–1934	65	0	
Arthur Crompton	England	OF	1932–1933	44	14	
Jack Astley	England	RB	1933–1935	50	0	
Ernest Muttitt	England	U	1933–1939	94	25	
Dai Richards	Wales	WH	1935–1937	58	0	
Joe Wilson	England	FB	1935–1938	63	3	
Les Smith	England	OL	1936–1939; 1952	78	7	
George Eastham	England	IF	1937–1938	50	1	
Tally Sneddon	Scotland	WH	1937–1939	70	2	
Len Townsend	England	CF	1937–1947	41	14	
Jackie Gibbons ♦	England	IF	1938–1939; 1947–1949	72	19	(Note: Capped by England at amateur level.) (Note: Represented the FA XI.)
Gerry McAloon	Scotland	IF	1938; 1946	36	18	
George Wilkins	England	IF	1939–1947	33	7	

=== Post-war era (1945–2000) ===
Name	Nationality	Position	Brentford career	Appearances	Goals	Notes
Alec Blakeman	England	IF	1946–1948	49	7	
Archie Macaulay	Scotland	IF	1946–1947	30	2	(Note: Represented Great Britain in friendly internationals.)
Malky McDonald ♦	Scotland	RB	1946–1949	93	1	
George Paterson (c)	Scotland	WH	1946–1949	66	0	
George Smith	England	CH	1946–1947	52	1	
George Stewart	Scotland	IF	1946–1947	25	3	
Peter Buchanan	Scotland	OR	1947–1949	80	14	
Jack Chisholm	England	CH	1947–1949	55	1	
Tommy Dawson	England	IF	1947–1948	38	11	
Ted Gaskell	England	GK	1947–1952	38	0	
Dickie Girling	England	OL	1947–1950	90	10	
Peter McKennan	Scotland	IF	1948–1949	28	9	
Jimmy Hill	England	IF/WH	1949–1952	86	10	
Johnny Paton	Scotland	OL	1949–1952	94	16	
Wally Quinton	England	FB	1949–1950	43	0	
Reg Newton	England	GK	1950–1957	90	0	(Note: Newton rejoined Brentford in July 1957, but made no appearances.)
Tommy Lawton ♦	England	CF	1952–1953	53	19	
Terry Ledgerton	England	OL	1952–1954	47	9	
Alan Bassham	England	RB	1953–1957	45	0	
Frank Dudley	England	IF	1953–1957	80	35	
George Lowden	England	LB	1953–1956	29	0	
James Robertson	Scotland	OL	1953–1956	85	14	
Jimmy Bloomfield	England	IF	1954; 1964–1965	95	6	
Sonny Feehan	Republic of Ireland	GK	1954–1958	36	0	
Terry Robinson	England	CH	1954–1957	38	1	
George Stobbart	England	IF	1954–1955	64	23	
Wendell Morgan	Wales	WH	1955–1957	49	6	
Jeff Taylor (c)	England	FW	1955–1957	98	35	
Sid Tickridge	England	FB	1955–1956	67	0	
Len Newcombe	Wales	OL	1956–1958	89	8	
Ron Peplow	England	WH/IF	1956–1961	66	5	
Sid Russell	England	LB/CB	1956–1960	54	0	
Johnny Hales	Scotland	OF	1959–1964	68	7	
George Summers	Scotland	FW	1960–1964	79	27	
Jimmy Belcher	England	WH	1961–1962	36	1	
Johnny Brooks	England	IF	1961–1963	91	36	
Brian Edgley	England	IF	1961–1962	45	13	
Jimmy Gitsham	England	LB	1961–1963	61	0	
Tom Anthony	England	LB	1962–1963	36	1	
Matt Crowe	Scotland	WH	1962–1964	83	0	
John Dick	Scotland	IF	1962–1964	83	48	
Billy McAdams	Northern Ireland	CF	1962–1964	87	39	
Fred Ryecraft	England	GK	1962–1963	38	0	
John Fielding	England	IF	1963–1965	93	21	
Willie Smith	Scotland	WH/IL	1963–1966	30	0	
Dai Ward	Wales	IF	1963–1965	54	24	
Joe Bonson	England	CF	1964–1966	42	15	
Billy Cobb	England	IF	1964–1966	81	26	
Mark Lazarus	England	OR	1964–1965	69	21	
Tom Curley	Scotland	OR	1965–1967	41	6	
Eddie Reeve	England	LH	1965–1967	26	0	
John Richardson	England	DF	1966–1969	96	9	
George Dobson	England	OR	1967–1970	93	10	
Keith Hooker	England	FW/WH	1967–1968	34	2	
Ron Fenton ♦ (c)	England	IF	1968–1970	97	21	
Pat Terry	England	CF	1968–1969	31	13	
John O'Mara	England	FW	1971–1972	57	28	
Stewart Houston	Scotland	DF	1972–1973	82	9	
Alan Murray	England	MF	1972–1973	48	7	
Stan Webb	England	FW	1972–1973	41	8	
Andy Woon	England	FW	1972–1975	50	12	
Dave Metchick	England	MF	1973–1975	65	4	
Barry Salvage	England	LW	1973–1975	91	8	
Keith Lawrence	England	CB	1974–1976	89	2	
Steve Sherwood	England	GK	1974–1975	64	0	(Note: On loan from Chelsea.)
Dave Simmons	England	FW	1974–1975	58	18	
Micky French	England	FW	1975–1977	73	15	
Nigel Smith	England	CB	1975–1978	96	0	
Gordon Sweetzer	Canada	FW	1975–1978; 1982	85	45	
Allan Glover	England	IF/W	1976; 1978–1980	32	2	(Note: Joined on loan from West Bromwich Albion in October 1976 and returned to sign permanently in November 1978.)
Paul Walker	England	MF	1976–1983	80	6	
Doug Allder	England	W	1977–1980	95	3	
Willie Graham	Northern Ireland	MF	1977–1981	48	3	
Barry Lloyd	England	MF	1977–1978	31	4	
Dean Smith	England	FW	1978–1980	54	16	
Lee Holmes	England	FW	1979–1980	30	7	
David Crown	England	LW	1980–1981	53	10	
Tony Funnell	England	FW	1980–1981	35	10	
Ron Harris	England	RB/MF	1980–1984	76	0	
Mark Hill	England	LB	1980–1982	62	3	
Gary Johnson	England	FW	1980–1981	63	13	
David McKellar	Scotland	GK	1980–1982	92	0	
Keith Bowen	England	FW	1981–1983	58	12	
Stan Bowles	England	MF	1981–1983; 1983–1984	95	17	(Note: Bowles retired in May 1983 and rejoined the club on non-contract terms in December 1983.)
Terry Rowe	England	RB	1981–1984	81	1	
Tony Mahoney	England	FW	1982–1984	58	19	
Paddy Roche	Republic of Ireland	GK	1982–1984	84	0	
Graham Wilkins	England	FB	1982–1984	46	0	
Terry Bullivant	England	MF	1981–1985; 1985–1986	51	2	(Note: Bullivant was released in May 1985 and rejoined the club on a one-year contract as a free agent in August 1985.)
Tony Lynch	England	RW	1983–1986	57	5	
Paul Roberts	England	DF	1983–1985	76	2	
Trevor Swinburne	England	GK	1983–1985	69	0	
Rowan Alexander	Scotland	FW	1984–1986	59	14	
Bobby Fisher	England	RB	1984–1986	56	0	
George Torrance	Scotland	LM	1984–1986	44	3	
Steve Wignall (c)	England	CB	1984–1986	84	3	
Phil Bater	Wales	DF/MF	1986–1987	25	2	
Robbie Carroll	England	RW	1986–1988	42	10	
Ian Holloway	England	MF	1986–1987	36	2	(Note: Joined on loan from Wimbledon in March 1986 and transferred permanently in July 1986.)
Paul Maddy	Wales	MF	1986–1987	38	6	
Steve Perryman ♦	England	FB/MF	1986–1990	63	0	
Gary Stevens	England	CF	1986–1987	41	14	
Wayne Turner (c)	England	MF	1986–1988	62	2	
Andy Feeley	England	RB/MF	1987–1989	89	0	
Colin Lee	England	U	1987–1988	35	11	
Paul Buckle	England	MF	1988–1994	78	1	
John Buttigieg	Malta	SW/RB	1988–1991	47	0	
Tony Parks	England	GK	1988–1991	91	0	
Jason Cousins	England	RB	1989–1991	28	0	
Mark Fleming	England	LB	1989–1991	45	1	
Eddie May	Scotland	MF	1989–1990	62	13	
Robbie Peters	England	LB/LW	1989–1994	42	2	
Tony Sealy	England	FW	1989; 1991	36	7	
Lee Luscombe	England	LW	1991–1993	55	8	
Wilf Rostron	England	LB/MF	1991–1992	52	2	
Joe Allon	England	FW	1992–1994	56	28	
Mickey Bennett	England	RW/FW	1992–1994	59	4	
Chris Hughton	England	LB	1992	41	0	
Shane Westley	England	CB	1992–1995	80	3	
Gus Hurdle	Barbados	RB	1993–1998	93	0	
Paul Stephenson	England	W	1993–1995	83	3	
Carl Asaba	England	FW	1994–1997	67	27	
Paul Abrahams	England	RW	1995–1996	39	8	
Marcus Bent	England	FW/W	1995–1997	91	13	
Dean Martin	England	RW	1995–1996	26	1	
Joe Omigie	England	FW	1995–1997	30	2	
Scott Canham	England	MF	1996–1998	60	1	(Note: Joined on loan from West Ham United in January 1996 and transferred permanently in August 1996.)
Warren Aspinall	England	MF	1997–1999	51	5	
Derek Bryan	England	RW/FW	1997–2001	59	8	
Glenn Cockerill	England	CM	1997–1998	25	0	
Charlie Oatway	England	DM	1997–1999	65	1	
Kevin Rapley	England	FW	1997–1999	62	15	
Paul Watson	England	FB	1997–1999	42	0	
Danny Boxall	Republic of Ireland	RB	1998–2002	84	1	(Note: Capped by Republic of Ireland at U21 level.)
Tony Folan	Republic of Ireland	LW	1998–2001	60	9	
Darren Freeman	England	FW	1998–1999	30	9	
Hermann Hreiðarsson	Iceland	CB	1998–1999	48	8	
Jason Pearcey	England	GK	1998–2000	30	0	
Scott Marshall	Scotland	CB	1999–2003	94	7	
David Theobald	England	CB	1999–2002	37	0	
Andy Woodman	England	GK	1999–2000	67	0	

=== 21st century (2000–present) ===
Name	Nationality	Position	Brentford career	Appearances	Goals	Notes
Paul Gibbs	England	LB/LM	2000–2002	67	4	
Ólafur Gottskálksson	Iceland	GK	2000–2002	89	0	
Jay Lovett	England	RB	2000–2003	28	1	
Mark McCammon	Barbados	FW	2000–2003	91	15	
Lorenzo Pinamonte	Italy	FW	2000	26	3	
Mark Williams	England	RW	2000–2003	82	4	
Ben Burgess	Republic of Ireland	FW	2001–2002	51	18	(Note: On loan from Blackburn Rovers.)
Steve Sidwell	England	MF	2001–2002	35	4	(Note: On loan from Arsenal.)
Jay Smith	England	CM	2001–2004	60	0	
Matt Somner	Wales	DF	2001–2004	93	2	(Note: Capped by Wales at U21 level.)
Stephen Evans	Wales	CM	2002–2004	59	5	
Jamie Fullarton	Scotland	MF	2002–2003	32	1	
Leo Roget	England	CB	2002–2004	33	0	
Ibrahima Sonko	Senegal	CB	2002–2004	91	11	(Note: Capped by Senegal at U23 level.)
Rowan Vine	England	FW	2002–2003	50	13	(Note: On loan from Portsmouth. Vine later joined on loan from Queens Park Rangers in 2010, but made no appearances.)
Matt Harrold	England	FW	2003–2005	39	5	
Joel Kitamirike	England	CB	2003–2004	25	0	
Ben May	England	FW	2003–2004; 2004–2005	59	8	(Note: On loan from Millwall.)
Alex Rhodes	England	LW	2003–2007	65	6	
Tony Rougier	Trinidad and Tobago	RW/FW	2003–2004	34	5	
Tommy Wright	England	FW	2003–2004	29	0	(Note: On loan from Leicester City.)
Deon Burton	Jamaica	FW	2004–2005	50	10	
Chris Hargreaves	England	AM	2004–2005	39	3	
Ryan Peters	England	RW	2004–2007	47	2	
Isaiah Rankin	England	FW	2004–2006	97	19	
John Salako	England	LW/LB	2004–2005	45	5	
Stewart Talbot (c)	England	DM	2004–2005	64	4	
Paul Brooker	England	RW	2005–2007	86	4	
DJ Campbell	England	FB	2005–2006	28	12	
Darius Charles	England	LB	2005–2008	42	1	
Scott Fitzgerald	England	FW	2005–2006	26	6	(Note: Joined on loan from Watford in March 2005 and transferred permanently later that month.)
Charlie Ide	England	FW	2005–2007	54	8	
John Mousinho	England	RB	2005–2008	72	2	
Ricky Newman (c)	England	CM	2005–2006	39	3	
Darren Pratley	England	MF	2005; 2005–2006	36	1	(Note: On loan from Fulham.)
Sam Tillen	England	LB/LM	2005–2007	83	1	
Adam Griffiths	Australia	CB	2006–2007	39	1	
Matt Heywood (c)	England	CB	2006–2008	67	2	(Note: Joined on loan from Bristol City in July 2006 and transferred permanently in August 2006.)
Jo Kuffour	England	FW	2006–2007	44	13	
Thomas Pinault	France	CM	2006–2007	31	1	
Calum Willock	Saint Kitts and Nevis	FW	2006–2007	43	4	
Simon Brown	England	GK	2007–2009	30	0	
Alan Connell	England	FW	2007–2008	47	12	
Ben Hamer	England	GK	2007; 2008; 2008–2009; 2010–2011	80	0	(Note: On loan from Reading.)
Craig Pead	England	RB	2007–2008	44	0	
Glenn Poole	England	LW	2007–2009	78	21	
Ricky Shakes	Guyana	W	2007–2008	42	4	
Gary Smith	England	DM	2007–2009	36	1	
Alan Bennett (c)	Republic of Ireland	CB	2008; 2008–2010	75	2	(Note: Joined on loan from Reading for separate spells in March 2008 and August 2008 and transferred permanently in July 2009.)
Nathan Elder	England	FW	2008–2009	47	11	
Adam Newton (c)	Saint Kitts and Nevis	MF	2008–2009	39	1	
Mark Phillips	England	CB	2008–2010	60	1	
Marvin Williams	England	W	2008–2009	38	2	
James Wilson *	Wales	CB	2008; 2009	30	0	(Note: On loan from Bristol City.)
Pim Balkestein	Netherlands	CB	2009; 2010–2012	46	2	(Note: Joined on loan from Ipswich Town for separate spells in November 2009 and March 2010 and transferred permanently in August 2010.)
Carl Cort	Guyana	FW	2009–2010	34	7	
Danny Foster	England	RB	2009–2010	42	0	
David Hunt	England	MF	2009–2011	55	5	
Ben Strevens	England	FW	2009–2010	29	7	
Wojciech Szczęsny *	Poland	GK	2009–2010	28	0	
Gary Alexander (c)	England	FW	2010–2012	77	26	
Lewis Grabban	England	FW	2010; 2011	32	7	
Richard Lee (c)	England	GK	2010–2014	87	0	
Simon Moore *	England	GK	2010–2013	77	0	
Robbie Simpson	England	FW	2010–2011	36	8	
Michael Spillane	Republic of Ireland	CB	2010–2011	32	1	
Craig Woodman	England	LB	2010–2012	76	1	
Harry Forrester	England	AM	2011–2013	69	11	
Niall McGinn	Northern Ireland	RM	2011–2012	41	5	(Note: On loan from Celtic.)
Jake Reeves *	England	CM	2011–2014	46	1	
Tom Adeyemi	England	CM	2012–2013	39	3	(Note: On loan from Norwich City.)
Stuart Dallas	Northern Ireland	LW	2012–2015	75	8	
Farid El Alagui	Morocco	FW	2012–2013	30	9	
Paul Hayes	England	FW	2012–2013	33	6	
Marcello Trotta	Italy	FW	2012–2013; 2013–2014	69	22	
Josh Clarke	England	RB/RW	2013–2019	84	5	
Will Grigg	Northern Ireland	FW	2013–2014	36	5	
George Saville *	Northern Ireland	CM	2013–2014	44	4	
Andre Gray	Jamaica	FW	2014–2015	52	20	
Scott Hogan *	Republic of Ireland	FW	2014–2017	36	21	
Jota	Spain	AM	2014–2017	78	23	
Moses Odubajo *	England	RW/RB	2014–2015; 2018–2019	84	3	(Note: Capped by England at U20 level.)
Alex Pritchard	England	AM	2014–2015	47	12	(Note: On loan from Tottenham Hotspur.)
Tommy Smith	England	RW	2014–2015	32	1	
James Tarkowski *	England	CB	2014–2016	74	4	
Jon Toral *	Spain	MF	2014–2015	37	6	
Andreas Bjelland	Denmark	CB/LB	2015–2018	65	1	
Maxime Colin *	France	RB	2015–2017	66	4	
Philipp Hofmann *	Germany	FW	2015–2017	33	4	
Konstantin Kerschbaumer	Austria	CM	2015–2017	52	1	
John Swift *	England	RW	2015–2016	28	7	
Lasse Vibe	Denmark	FW/RW	2015–2018	97	37	(Note: Capped by Denmark at U23 level.)
John Egan (c) *	Republic of Ireland	CB	2016–2018	71	7	
Lewis Macleod	Scotland	MF	2016–2019	43	4	
Luke Daniels	England	GK	2017–2021	36	0	
Florian Jozefzoon	Suriname	W	2017–2018	62	8	
Chris Mepham *	Wales	CB	2017–2018	48	1	
Saïd Benrahma *	Algeria	W	2018–2020	94	27	
Marcus Forss	Finland	FW	2018–2022	74	19	(Note: Capped by Finland at U21 level.)
Julian Jeanvier	Guinea	CB	2018–2020	58	6	
Ezri Konsa *	England	CB	2018–2019	47	1	(Note: Capped by England at U21 level.)
Emiliano Marcondes *	Denmark	AM	2018–2021	97	7	
Mads Bech Sørensen *	Denmark	CB	2018–2023	72	4	(Note: Capped by Denmark at U21 level.)
Jan Žambůrek *	Czech Republic	CM	2019–2021	29	0	(Note: Capped by Czech Republic at U21 level.)
Shandon Baptiste *	Grenada	MF	2020–2024	78	2	
Tariqe Fosu	Ghana	LW	2020–2022	63	5	
Mathias Jørgensen	Denmark	CB	2021–2024	48	2	(Note: Jørgensen was released in June 2022 and rejoined the club on a two-year contract as a free agent in August 2022.)
Frank Onyeka *	Nigeria	DM	2021–2025	90	1	
Aaron Hickey ‡	Scotland	RB	2022–	74	2	
Ben Mee	England	CB	2022–2025	68	5	
Mark Flekken *	Netherlands	GK	2023–2025	77	0	
Sepp van den Berg ‡	Netherlands	CB/RB	2024–	73	0	
Fábio Carvalho ‡	Portugal	AM	2024–	36	8	
Igor Thiago ‡	Brazil	FW	2024–	57	27	
Jordan Henderson *	England	DM	2025–2026	34	1	
Michael Kayode ‡	Italy	RB	2025–	65	2	(Note: Joined on loan from Fiorentina in January 2025 and transferred permanently in May 2025.) (Note: Capped by Italy at U21 level.)
Caoimhín Kelleher ‡	Republic of Ireland	GK	2025–	45	0	
Dango Ouattara ‡	Burkina Faso	RW	2025–	46	6	
