= 1925–26 Brentford F.C. season =

English football team season

Brentford
1925–26 season
- Chairman: Alderman A.W. Bradford
- Manager: Fred Halliday
- Stadium: Griffin Park
- Third Division South: 18th
- FA Cup: Second round
- Top goalscorer: League: Watkins (11); All: Watkins (11)
- Highest home attendance: 16,893
- Lowest home attendance: 5,632
- Average home league attendance: 9,146
Home colours

During the 1925–26 English football season, Brentford competed in the Football League Third Division South and finished in 18th place, conceding a club record 94 goals.

== Season summary ==
Brentford's 1925–26 team photograph.

Brentford manager Fred Halliday overhauled the club's squad during the 1925 off-season, with all but seven players being released. Despite running a deficit of £6,000 (equivalent to £432,300 in 2023), the board of directors pledged a "substantial sum of money" for the transfer of quality players and in came new goalkeeper John Thomson, four full backs, four half backs and new forwards Bill Finlayson and Bert Young. The club's colours were changed to the now-traditional red-and-white stripes, black shorts and black socks.

9 defeats from the opening 10 matches of the season left Brentford rooted to the bottom of the Third Division South and forward Reginald Parker (one of the club's highest scorers during the previous two seasons) elected to transfer to South Shields. Griffin Park was closed by the Football League for the first and only time due to crowd disturbance during a 6–1 thrashing at the hands of Brighton & Hove Albion on 12 September 1925. The ground was reopened 14 days later. The poor run ended with the first victory of the season on 17 October, 2–1 over Bristol Rovers. Five wins in the following seven matches lifted the Bees out of the re-election places, with forwards Jack Lane, Bill Finlayson and full back Percival Whitton (who had been deployed up front by manager Halliday) all coming into form, with half back Alex Graham converting a number of penalties.

By 20 February 1926, a run of just five defeats in 19 matches lifted Brentford to 13th in the table. The signing of forward Ernie Watkins from Southend United for a then-club record fee of £1,000 in January 1928 proved to be money well-spent, with Watkins scoring 11 goals in his first 12 matches, including a hat-trick in the Bees' biggest victory of the season, 5–1 versus Norwich City on 2 April. The Bees' form petered out in the final two months of the season, winning just 3 of the final 12 matches to finish 18th with the worst defensive record in the division. The 94 goals conceded during the 1925–26 season is a club record.

== League table ==
Pos	Team	Pld	W	D	L	GF	GA	GAv	Pts
16	Norwich City	42	15	9	18	58	73	0.795	39
17	Newport County	42	14	10	18	64	74	0.865	38
18	Brentford	42	16	6	20	69	94	0.734	38
19	Bristol Rovers	42	15	6	21	66	69	0.957	36
20	Exeter City	42	15	5	22	72	70	1.029	35

== Results ==
Brentford's goal tally listed first.

=== Legend ===
Win	Draw	Loss

=== Football League Third Division South ===
No.	Date	Opponent	Venue	Result	Attendance	Scorer(s)
1	29 August 1925	Northampton Town	H	3–4	12,317	Allen (2), Graham
2	2 September 1925	Southend United	A	1–3	8,224	Allen
3	5 September 1925	Aberdare Athletic	A	0–3	4,140	
4	7 September 1925	Southend United	H	1–3	6,409	Douglas
5	12 September 1925	Brighton & Hove Albion	H	1–6	8,803	Parker
6	19 September 1925	Watford	A	2–2	4,771	Young, Parker
7	23 September 1925	Plymouth Argyle	A	0–4	8,384	
8	26 September 1925	Queens Park Rangers	H	1–2	9,719	Beacham
9	3 October 1925	Crystal Palace	A	0–2	15,724	
10	10 October 1925	Bristol City	A	0–3	11,095	
11	17 October 1925	Bristol Rovers	A	2–1	7,095	Lane, Whitton
12	24 October 1925	Swindon Town	H	3–1	8,282	Whitton, Finlayson, Graham (pen)
13	31 October 1925	Newport County	A	3–2	4,933	Lane (2), Finlayson
14	7 November 1925	Luton Town	H	1–0	7,533	Lane
15	14 November 1925	Bournemouth & Boscombe Athletic	A	2–3	4,530	Whitton (2)
16	21 November 1925	Charlton Athletic	H	4–0	8,017	Whitton, Allen, Lane, Graham (pen)
17	5 December 1925	Merthyr Town	H	1–1	6,932	Graham (pen)
18	19 December 1925	Reading	H	1–0	7,064	Graham
19	25 December 1925	Millwall	A	1–2	13,333	Hendren
20	26 December 1925	Millwall	H	2–0	16,893	Allen (2)
21	28 December 1925	Exeter City	A	1–6	5,493	Finlayson
22	2 January 1926	Northampton Town	A	1–6	4,649	Allen
23	9 January 1926	Gillingham	A	3–1	6,093	Watkins, Douglas (2)
24	16 January 1926	Aberdare Athletic	H	1–0	5,632	Douglas
25	23 January 1926	Brighton & Hove Albion	A	2–3	6,107	Lane, Watkins
26	30 January 1926	Watford	H	4–3	7,711	Graham (2), Rae, Hendren
27	6 February 1926	Queens Park Rangers	A	1–1	13,085	Plunkett (og)
28	13 February 1926	Crystal Palace	H	3–2	10,140	Watkins (2), Douglas
29	20 February 1926	Bristol City	H	2–1	11,956	Watkins, Graham
30	27 February 1926	Bristol Rovers	H	4–1	9,902	Watkins, Douglas, Graham (pen), Rae
31	6 March 1926	Swindon Town	A	1–2	4,932	Hendren
32	13 March 1926	Newport County	H	3–3	9,643	Watkins (2), Rae
33	20 March 1926	Luton Town	A	2–4	6,072	Lane, Till (og)
34	27 March 1926	Bournemouth & Boscombe Athletic	H	0–2	7,687	
35	2 April 1926	Norwich City	H	5–1	11,463	Hendren, Watkins (3)
36	3 April 1926	Charlton Athletic	A	2–0	6,812	Young, Rae
37	5 April 1926	Norwich City	A	0–1	11,694	
38	10 April 1926	Gillingham	H	0–0	7,942	
39	17 April 1926	Merthyr Town	A	0–6	2,329	
40	24 April 1926	Exeter City	H	2–0	7,889	Finlayson, Douglas
41	26 April 1926	Plymouth Argyle	H	2–2	10,123	Finlayson, Douglas
42	1 May 1926	Reading	A	1–7	17,432	Lane

=== FA Cup ===
Round	Date	Opponent	Venue	Result	Attendance	Scorer(s)
1R	28 November 1925	Barnet	H	3–1	9,480	Lane, Whitton, Graham (pen)
2R	12 December 1925	Bournemouth & Boscombe Athletic	H	1–2	8,200	Whitton

- Sources: Statto, 11v11, 100 Years Of Brentford

== Playing squad ==
Players' ages are as of the opening day of the 1925–26 season.

Pos.	Name	Nat.	Date of birth (age)	Signed from	Signed in	Notes
Goalkeepers
GK	Harry Stanford	(England)	31 May 1899 (aged 26)	Southend United	1925	
GK	John Thomson	(Scotland)	27 July 1896 (aged 29)	Aberdare Athletic	1925	
Defenders
DF	James Donnelly	(Republic of Ireland)	18 December 1893 (aged 31)	Southend United	1925	
DF	James McClennon	(England)	16 December 1900 (aged 24)	Grimsby Town	1925	
DF	Jack Price	(England)	9 June 1900 (aged 25)	Swindon Town	1925	
Midfielders
HB	Jack Beacham	(England)	15 August 1902 (aged 23)	Weymouth	1925	
HB	Tommy Cain	(England)	10 November 1892 (aged 32)	Sheppey United	1924	
HB	Evan Evans	(Wales)	25 July 1903 (aged 22)	Llanidloes Town	1925	
HB	Alex Graham (c)	(Scotland)	11 July 1889 (aged 36)	Arsenal	1924	Assistant manager
HB	Alan Noble	(England)	19 June 1900 (aged 25)	Leeds United	1925	
HB	Harry Rae	(Scotland)	22 October 1895 (aged 29)	Clyde	1925	
HB	Jimmy Walton	(England)	3 November 1898 (aged 26)	Bristol Rovers	1924	
Forwards
FW	Jack Allen	(England)	31 January 1903 (aged 22)	Leeds United	1924	
FW	Alfred Douglas	(England)	26 March 1899 (aged 26)	Washington Colliery	1925	
FW	Bill Finlayson	(Scotland)	29 March 1899 (aged 26)	Clapton Orient	1925	
FW	Patsy Hendren	(England)	5 February 1889 (aged 36)	Queens Park Rangers	1911	Played when his cricket commitments allowed
FW	Jack Lane	(England)	29 May 1898 (aged 27)	Chesterfield	1925	
FW	Ernie Watkins	(England)	3 April 1898 (aged 27)	Southend United	1926	
FW	Frank Watson	(England)	15 November 1898 (aged 26)	Leeds United	1925	
FW	Percival Whitton	(England)	14 January 1892 (aged 33)	Newport County	1925	
FW	Bert Young	(England)	4 September 1899 (aged 25)	Aberdare Athletic	1925	
Players who left the club mid-season
FW	Reginald Parker	(England)	8 July 1902 (aged 23)	Boldon Comrades	1922	Transferred to South Shields

- Sources: Timeless Bees, Football League Players' Records 1888 to 1939, 100 Years Of Brentford

== Coaching staff ==
Name	Role
(England) Fred Halliday	Manager
(England) Tom Ratcliff	Trainer
(Scotland) Alex Graham	Assistant trainer

== Statistics ==
=== Appearances and goals ===

Brentford's highest appearance-makers in each position during the Football League season.

Pos	Nat	Name	League		FA Cup		Total	
Pos	Nat	Name	Apps	Goals	Apps	Goals	Apps	Goals
GK	(England)	Harry Stanford	2	0	0	0	2	0
GK	(Scotland)	John Thomson	40	0	2	0	42	0
DF	(Republic of Ireland)	James Donnelly	39	0	2	0	41	0
DF	(England)	James McClennon	24	0	2	0	26	0
DF	(England)	Jack Price	12	0	0	0	12	0
HB	(England)	Jack Beacham	4	1	0	0	4	1
HB	(England)	Tommy Cain	2	0	0	0	2	0
HB	(Wales)	Evan Evans	7	0	1	0	8	0
HB	(Scotland)	Alex Graham	25	9	2	1	27	10
HB	(England)	Alan Noble	31	0	1	0	32	0
HB	(Scotland)	Harry Rae	37	4	1	0	38	4
HB	(England)	Jimmy Walton	36	0	1	0	37	0
FW	(England)	Jack Allen	11	7	2	0	13	7
FW	(England)	Alfred Douglas	27	8	0	0	27	8
FW	(Scotland)	Bill Finlayson	21	5	1	0	22	5
FW	(England)	Patsy Hendren	28	5	2	0	30	5
FW	(England)	Jack Lane	38	8	2	1	40	9
FW	(England)	Reginald Parker	5	2	—		5	2
FW	(England)	Ernie Watkins	19	11	—		19	11
FW	(England)	Frank Watson	7	0	0	0	7	0
FW	(England)	Percy Whitton	25	5	2	2	27	7
FW	(England)	Bert Young	22	2	1	0	23	2

- Players listed in italics left the club mid-season.
- Source: 100 Years of Brentford

=== Goalscorers ===
Pos.	Nat	Player	FL3	FAC	Total
FW	(England)	Ernie Watkins	11	—	11
HB	(Scotland)	Alex Graham	9	1	10
FW	(England)	Jack Lane	8	1	9
FW	(England)	Alfred Douglas	8	0	8
FW	(England)	Jack Allen	7	0	7
FW	(England)	Percy Whitton	5	2	7
FW	(Scotland)	Bill Finlayson	5	0	5
FW	(England)	Patsy Hendren	5	0	5
HB	(Scotland)	Harry Rae	4	0	4
FW	(England)	Reginald Parker	2	—	2
FW	(England)	Bert Young	2	0	2
HB	(England)	Jack Beacham	1	0	1
Opponents			2	0	2
Total			62	4	68

- Players listed in italics left the club mid-season.
- Source: 100 Years of Brentford

=== Management ===
Name	Nat	From	To	Record All Comps					Record League				
Name	Nat	From	To	P	W	D	L	W %	P	W	D	L	W %
Fred Halliday	(England)	29 August 1925	1 May 1926	44	17	6	21	38.64|	42	16	6	20	38.10

=== Summary ===
Games played	44 (42 Third Division South, 2 FA Cup)
Games won	17 (16 Third Division South, 1 FA Cup)
Games drawn	6 (6 Third Division South, 0 FA Cup)
Games lost	21 (20 Third Division South, 1 FA Cup)
Goals scored	73 (69 Third Division South, 4 FA Cup)
Goals conceded	97 (94 Third Division South, 3 FA Cup)
Clean sheets	8 (8 Third Division South, 0 FA Cup)
Biggest league win	5–1 versus Norwich City, 2 April 1926
Worst league defeat	6–0 versus Merthyr Town, 2 April 1926; 7–1 versus Reading, 1 May 1926
Most appearances	42, John Thomson (40 Third Division South, 2 FA Cup)
Top scorer (league)	11, Ernie Watkins
Top scorer (all competitions)	11, Ernie Watkins

== Transfers & loans ==
Cricketers are not included in this list.

Players transferred in
Date	Pos.	Name	Previous club	Fee	Ref.
May 1925	HB	(England) Alan Noble	(England) Leeds United	Free	
30 June 1925	HB	(Scotland) Harry Rae	(Scotland) Clyde	n/a	
July 1925	DF	(Republic of Ireland) James Donnelly	(England) Southend United	Free	
July 1925	FW	(England) Percival Whitton	(Wales) Newport County	Free	
26 August 1925	GK	(Scotland) John Thomson	(Wales) Aberdare Athletic	Free	
August 1925	FW	(England) Alfred Douglas	(England) Washington Colliery	Free	
August 1925	DF	(England) James McClennon	(England) Grimsby Town	Free	
16 November 1925	DF	(England) Jack Price	(England) Swindon Town	Free	
1925	HB	(England) Jack Beacham	(England) Weymouth	Free	
1925	HB	(Wales) Evan Evans	(Wales) Llanidloes Town	Amateur	
1925	FW	(Scotland) Bill Finlayson	(England) Clapton Orient	Free	
1925	GK	(England) Harry Stanford	(England) Southend United	Free	
1925	FW	(England) Frank Watson	(England) Leeds United	Free	
January 1926	FW	(England) Ernie Watkins	(England) Southend United	£1,000	
Players transferred out
Date	Pos.	Name	Subsequent club	Fee	Ref.
September 1925	FW	(England) Reginald Parker	(England) South Shields	Nominal	
Players released
Date	Pos.	Name	Subsequent club	Join date	Ref.
August 1925	FB	(England) Charles Alton	(England) Northfleet United	1925	
May 1926	HB	(England) Tommy Cain	Retired		
May 1926	HB	(Scotland) Alex Graham	(England) Folkestone	1926	
May 1926	DF	(England) James McClennon	(England) Grimsby Town	1926	
May 1926	FW	(England) William Relph	(England) Blyth Spartans	1926	
May 1926	GK	(England) Harry Stanford	(England) Bristol Rovers	1926	
May 1926	DF	(Scotland) John Steel	Retired		
May 1926	GK	(Scotland) John Thomson	(England) Plymouth Argyle	8 June 1926	
May 1926	HB	(England) Jimmy Walton	(England) Hartlepools United	November 1926	
May 1926	FW	(England) Frank Watson	(England) Southend United	1926	
