= McKeeman =

McKeeman is a surname of Irish origin, derived from the Irish Gaelic surname Mac Eamoinn, which means "son of Eamonn". Notable people with the surname include:

- Laura Rutledge (born 1988), born Laura McKeeman, American reporter
- Tiffany Steuber (born 1977), born Tiffany McKeeman, Canadian curler

== See also ==
- Robert McKeeman Oakley (1871-1927), Australian public servant
