= George Morrall (footballer, born 1893) =

English footballer

Personal information
- Full name: George Alfred Morrall
- Date of birth: 1893
- Place of birth: Birmingham, England
- Date of death: 1964 (aged 70–71)
- Position: Inside forward

Senior career*
Years	Team	Apps	(Gls)
1909–1910	Sparkhill Avondale		
1910–1914	Redditch Town		
1914–1918	Nuneaton Town		
1918–1919	Blackheath Town		
1919–1920	Hull City	37	(17)
1920–1922	Grimsby Town	65	(8)
1922–1923	Redditch Town		
1923–192?	Brierley Hill Alliance		
- * Club domestic league appearances and goals

George Alfred Morrall (1893 – 1964) was an English professional footballer who played as an inside forward.
