= Edwin Abbott (public servant) =

Australian public servant

Edwin Abbott CBE

Controller-General of the Department of Trade and Customs
- In office December 1933 – July 1944

Personal details
- Born: 21 November 1878
- Died: 1 September 1947 (aged 68) Darling Point, Sydney, Australia
- Occupation: Public servant

Edwin Abbott CBE (21 November 1878 – 1 September 1947) was a senior Australian public servant. Between 1933 and 1944, he was Controller-General of the Department of Trade and Customs.

== Life and career ==
Abbott was born on 21 November 1878. He was educated at Fort Street High School in Sydney. At the age of 15, he joined the New South Wales Customs Department as a clerk. He entered the Commonwealth Public Service in the Department of Trade and Customs when the staff of his New South Wales department was taken over at Federation.

Between 1927 and 1933, Abbott served as Deputy Controller-General of Customs. In the role he traveled to London as adviser accompanying James Scullin to the Imperial Conference. He also traveled to Canada and the United States, and he helped to prepare the 1931 Canada-Australia trade agreement. In 1932 he attended the British Empire Economic Conference in Ottawa.

He was promoted to the position of Controller-General of Customs in December 1933. Whilst comptroller, Abbott travelled overseas on official business once more, visiting Canada and London again to discuss improvements to the agreements made in Ottawa in 1932.

Abbott retired from the public service in 1944.

Abbott died at his home in Darling Point, Sydney on 1 September 1947 while listening to the radio. He was survived by five daughters; his wife had died around three years prior.

== Awards ==
In January 1933, Abbott was appointed a Commander of the Order of the British Empire in recognition of services to the Department of Trade and Customs.

Government offices
Preceded by Ernest Thomas Hall	Controller-General of the Department of Trade and Customs; 1933 – 1944	Succeeded by John Kennedy
