= Harry Stanford =

English footballer

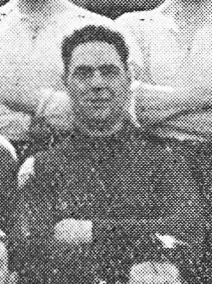
- Stanford while with Brentford in 1925.

Personal information
- Full name: Harold Stanford
- Date of birth: 31 May 1899
- Place of birth: Birmingham, England
- Date of death: 1975 (aged 75–76)
- Place of death: Birmingham, England
- Position: Goalkeeper

Youth career
- Earle Bourne

Senior career*
Years	Team	Apps	(Gls)
	Walsall	0	(0)
	Southend United	0	(0)
1925–1926	Brentford	2	(0)
1926	Bristol Rovers	0	(0)
- Brierley Hill Alliance
1927	Coventry City	11	(0)
- * Club domestic league appearances and goals

Harold Stanford (31 May 1899 – 1975) was an English professional footballer who played as a goalkeeper in the Football League for Coventry City and Brentford.

== Career statistics ==
Appearances and goals by club, season and competition
Club	Season	League			FA Cup		Total	
Club	Season	Division	Apps	Goals	Apps	Goals	Apps	Goals
Brentford	1925–26	Third Division South	2	0	0	0	2	0
Coventry City	1927–28	Third Division South	11	0	0	0	11	0
Career total			13	0	0	0	13	0
