= Bill Turner (public servant) =

Australian public servant

Bill Turner ISO

Comptroller-General of the Department of Trade and Customs
- In office 7 January 1949 – 30 December 1952

Personal details
- Born: William Terry Turner; 1 December 1887 Woolloomooloo, New South Wales
- Died: 26 January 1959 (aged 71) Canberra, Australian Capital Territory
- Spouse: Annie Isabella Griffiths (m. 1920–1959)
- Occupation: Public servant

William Terry Turner ISO (1 December 1887 – 26 January 1959) was a senior Australian public servant. He was Comptroller-General of Customs between 1949 and 1952, heading the Department of Trade and Customs.

== Life and career ==
Turner was born in Woolloomooloo, New South Wales on 1 December 1887.

Turner joined the Commonwealth Public Service in 1905 in as a clerk in the Department of Trade and Customs. He enlisted in the Australian Imperial Force in 1916, and embarked from Australia for overseas service on 24 January 1917 aboard HMAT Anchises A68. After he returned from military service, Turner returned to the customs department and was put in charge of the activities of the Commonwealth public trustee and subsequently the Clearing Office in New South Wales. During the Second World War, Turner was responsible for contraband administration and export control.

He was promoted to the role of Comptroller-General in January 1949. He retired in 1952, with plans to spend his retirement in Canberra. Colleagues and business stakeholders celebrated Turner's retirement and honoured him at a function at the Menzies Hotel. More than 100 people attended, and Turner was presented with an Australian painting and a radiogram for his wife Annie.

Turner died on 26 January 1959 at Canberra Community Hospital. His body was cremated.

== Awards ==
Turner was made a companion of the Imperial Service Order in June 1953, in recognition of his public service as Comptroller-General of Customs.

Government offices
Preceded by John Kennedy	Comptroller-General of the Department of Trade and Customs; 1949 – 1952	Succeeded by Frank Meere
