= Department of Trade and Customs =

Australian government department, 1901–1956

Department overview
- Formed: 1 January 1901
- Dissolved: 11 January 1956
- Superseding Department: Department of Customs and Excise Department of Primary Industry (I) Department of Trade (I)
- Jurisdiction: Commonwealth of Australia

The Department of Trade and Customs was an Australian government department that existed between 1901 and 1956. It was one of the inaugural government departments of Australia established at federation.

== History ==
The department was one of the first seven Commonwealth Government departments to be established in the Federation year, 1901. The first head of the department was Harry Wollaston, appointed in 1901. In that first year, Wollaston and Charles Kingston worked closely together in drafting legislation and the first Commonwealth customs tariff.

In 1956, the department was abolished and most of its functions were split between the Department of Customs and Excise and the Department of Trade.

== Scope ==
Information about the department's functions and government funding allocation could be found in the Administrative Arrangements Orders, the annual Portfolio Budget Statements and in the department's annual reports.

By 1906 the department was responsible for:

- bounties;
- copyrights;
- Customs and Excise;
- designs and patents;
- lighthouses, lightships, beacons, buoys;
- quarantine;
- trade and commerce (including navigation and shipping);
- trade marks, dumping, monopolies and combines;
- weights and measures; and the
- censorship of literature and films.

== Structure ==
The department was a Commonwealth Public Service department, staffed by officials who were responsible to the Minister for Trade and Customs.

The head of the department was the Comptroller-General, initially Harry Wollaston, and later:

- Nicholas Lockyer (1911–13);
- Stephen Mills (1913–22);
- Percy Whitton (1922–23);
- Robert McKeeman Oakley (1923–27);
- Ernest Thomas Hall (1927–33);
- Edwin Abbott (1933–44);
- John Kennedy (1944–49);
- Bill Turner (1949–52); and
- Sir Frank Meere (1952–56).
