= Alfred Douglas (footballer) =

English footballer

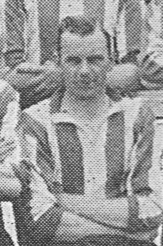
- Douglas while with Brentford in 1926.

Personal information
- Full name: Edward Alfred C Douglas
- Date of birth: 26 March 1899
- Place of birth: Hebburn, England
- Position: Outside left

Senior career*
| Years | Team | Apps | (Gls) |
- Crook Town
- Newcastle United
| 1922 | Crystal Palace | 2 | (1) |
- West Stanley
- Washington Colliery
| 1925–1929 | Brentford | 101 | (21) |
| 1929–1931 | Reading | 6 | (0) |
- Bristol Rovers
- Guildford City
- * Club domestic league appearances and goals

Edward Alfred C. Douglas, sometimes known as Eddie Douglas, was an English professional footballer who made over 100 appearances as an outside left in the Football League for Brentford.

== Career ==
Douglas began his career with Northern League club Crook Town. Following abortive spells at Football League clubs Newcastle United and Crystal Palace, he resumed his career with stints at North Eastern League clubs West Stanley and Washington Colliery. Douglas was handed another chance at league football with Third Division South club Brentford in 1925 and went on to become a regular pick as an outside left, making 109 appearances and scoring 21 goals in a four-season spell. Douglas' performances won him the attention of Second Division club Reading and he moved to Elm Park in an exchange deal for Billy Lane in 1929. He made only a handful of appearances for the Royals and ended his career with spells at Bristol Rovers and Guildford City.

== Career statistics ==
Appearances and goals by club, season and competition
| Club | Season | League | | | FA Cup | | Total | |
| Club | Season | Division | Apps | Goals | Apps | Goals | Apps | Goals |
|---|---|---|---|---|---|---|---|---|
| Crystal Palace | 1922–23 | Second Division | 2 | 1 | 0 | 0 | 2 | 1 |
| Brentford | 1925–26 | Third Division South | 27 | 8 | 0 | 0 | 27 | 8 |
| Brentford | 1926–27 | Third Division South | 26 | 5 | 6 | 0 | 32 | 5 |
| Brentford | 1927–28 | Third Division South | 24 | 2 | 1 | 0 | 25 | 2 |
| Brentford | 1928–29 | Third Division South | 24 | 6 | 1 | 0 | 25 | 6 |
| Brentford | Total | | 101 | 21 | 8 | 0 | 109 | 21 |
| Career total | | | 103 | 22 | 8 | 0 | 111 | 22 |

== Honours ==
Brentford

- London Charity Fund: 1928
