= Harry Wollaston =

Australian public servant

Sir Harry Wollaston KCMG ISO

Comptroller-General of the Department of Trade and Customs
- In office 1901–1911

Personal details
- Born: Harry Newton Phillips Wollaston; 17 January 1846 Mokine, near Clackline, Western Australia
- Died: 11 February 1921 (aged 75) Melbourne, Victoria
- Resting place: Boroondara General Cemetery
- Occupation: Public servant

Sir Harry Newton Phillips Wollaston KCMG ISO (17 January 1846 – 11 February 1921) was a senior Australian public servant. He was the first Comptroller-General of the Department of Trade and Customs, from 1901 to his retirement in 1911.

== Life and career ==
Wollaston was born on 17 January 1846 in the locality of Mokine, near Clackline, Western Australia. He was educated at St John's College, Auckland, Nelson College and the University of Melbourne.

In 1863 he joined the Victorian Department of Trade and Customs as a tide surveyor and landing waiter.

In 1891, Wollaston was appointed Secretary of the Victorian Trade and Customs Department. He was Chairman of the Committee which reported on the Federal Constitution Bill before it was adopted by the colonies and Australia was federated.

Between 1901 and 1911, Wollaston was Comptroller-General of Customs. The Department was one of the first seven Australian Government departments to be established in the Federation year, 1901.

Wollaston died in Melbourne on 11 February 1921.

== Awards ==
Wollaston was appointed a Companion of the Imperial Service Order in May 1903.

In 1907, having served as Comptroller-General of Customs for several years, he was made a Companion of the Order of St Michael and St George. He was promoted to a Knight Commander of the Order in June 1912.

Government offices
New title Department established at Federation	Comptroller-General of the Department of Trade and Customs; 1901 – 1911	Succeeded by Nicholas Lockyer
