= Walker Celtic F.C. =

Walker Celtic A.F.C.
- Full name: Walker Celtic Association Football Club
- Nickname: the Tynesiders
- Founded: 1896
- Dissolved: 1939
- Ground: Alkali Farm Ground
- Capacity: 5,060

Walker Celtic Football Club was a semi-professional association football club based in Walker, Newcastle upon Tyne, England.

== History ==
The first reference to the club is from the 1896–97 season. The club first came to prominence in 1918–19 by winning the Northumberland Senior Cup, the Tyne Charity Shield (jointly), and the Tynemouth Infirmary Cup, an unparalleled achievement for an amateur club.

It joined the North Eastern League Second Division in 1926, and was promoted to the top flight in 1930. In 1934–35, the club came 3rd overall, and won the medals for the best "non-reserve" club, only Middlesbrough and Sunderland reserves finishing higher. The club went one better the following season with a runner-up finish.

In the 1937–38 season, the team reached the First Round Proper of the FA Cup for the only time. It held Bradford City to a 1–1 draw at home, in front of a record crowd of 5,060; left-winger Hiftie gave the home side a shock lead inside five minutes, and both right-half Watson and inside-right Rooney struck the bar, before a first-half equalizer completed the scoring. The Tynesiders went down in the replay at Valley Parade by 11 goals to 3, Deakin scoring City's first three goals between the 16th and 26th minutes, although the goal of the match was Celtic right-back Cotterill's 40 yard free-kick to reduce the deficit to 4–1.

In 1939, after nine consecutive seasons in the First Division, the club was expelled on a 9–7 committee vote, for demanding £10 expenses from Workington and Middlesbrough to fulfil fixtures - perhaps not coincidentally the League had also agreed to reduce the number of clubs from 20 to 18, but the club had been so cash-strapped it had resorted to a public appeal for donations to complete the season. It joined the Northern Alliance for 1939–40, but it did not play after the season.

== Colours ==
The club wore red and green.

== Ground ==
The club originally played on the Walker Road Ground, near St Anthony's. It moved to the Alkali Farm Ground before the 1920–21 season.

== Honours ==
- North Eastern League Second Division: 1929–30

== Former players ==
1. Players that have played/managed in the Football League or any foreign equivalent to this level (i.e. fully professional league).
2. Players with full international caps.
3. Players that hold a club record or have captained the club.

- (England) Jack Allen
- (England) James McClennon
