= Frank Watson (footballer) =

English footballer

- Watson with Brentford in 1925.

Personal information
- Full name: Frank Watson
- Date of birth: 15 November 1898
- Place of birth: Basford, England
- Date of death: 27 September 1972 (aged 73)
- Place of death: Nottingham, England
- Height: 5 ft 8 in (1.73 m)
- Position: Forward

Senior career*
Years	Team	Apps	(Gls)
1920–1921	Ilkeston United		
1921–1922	Aston Villa	0	(0)
1922–1924	Blackpool	2	(0)
1924–1925	Leeds United	0	(0)
1925–1926	Brentford	7	(0)
1926–1927	Ilkeston United		
1927–1931	Grantham		
1931	Mansfield Town	0	(0)
- * Club domestic league appearances and goals

Frank Watson (15 November 1898 – 27 September 1972) was an English professional football forward who played in the Football League for Blackpool and Brentford.

== Career statistics ==
Appearances and goals by club, season and competition
Club	Season	League			FA Cup		Total	
Club	Season	Division	Apps	Goals	Apps	Goals	Apps	Goals
Brentford	1925–26	Third Division South	7	0	0	0	7	0
Career total			7	0	0	0	7	0
