= Tommy Cain =

English footballer

Personal information
- Full name: Thomas Cain
- Date of birth: 10 November 1892
- Place of birth: Horsenden Hill, England
- Date of death: September 1975 (aged 82)
- Place of death: Ealing, England
- Position: Wing half

Senior career*
Years	Team	Apps	(Gls)
- Richmond YMCA
- → Bohemians (guest)
1919–1920	Queens Park Rangers	6	(0)
- Guildford United
- Dartford
- Sheppey United
1924–1925	Brentford	11	(0)
- * Club domestic league appearances and goals

Thomas Cain (10 November 1892 – September 1975) was an English footballer who played in the Football League for Brentford as a wing half.

== Career ==
A wing half, Cain began his career at Richmond YMCA before the outbreak of the First World War in 1914. During the war, he guested for Irish club Bohemians. After the war, he played for Queens Park Rangers, Guildford United, Dartford and Sheppey United. Cain joined Third Division South club Brentford in 1924 and made 12 appearances for the struggling team, before departing the following year.

== Personal life ==
Cain served in the East Surrey Regiment.

== Career statistics ==
Appearances and goals by club, season and competition
Club	Season	League			FA Cup		Total	
Club	Season	Division	Apps	Goals	Apps	Goals	Apps	Goals
Queens Park Rangers	1919–20	Southern League First Division	6	0	0	0	6	0
Brentford	1924–25	Third Division South	9	0	1	0	10	0
Brentford	1925–26	Third Division South	2	0	0	0	2	0
Brentford	Total		11	0	1	0	12	0
Career total			17	0	1	0	18	0
