= Evan Evans (footballer) =

Welsh footballer

Personal information
- Full name: Evan Thomas Evans
- Date of birth: 23 July 1903
- Place of birth: Llanidloes, Wales
- Date of death: 1982 (aged 78–79)
- Position: Wing half

Senior career*
| Years | Team | Apps | (Gls) |
- Llanidloes Town
| 1925–1928 | Brentford | 7 | (0) |
- Chatham Town
- Gaslight
- * Club domestic league appearances and goals

Evan Thomas Evans (23 July 1903 – 1982) was a Welsh professional footballer who played as a wing half in the Football League for Brentford.

== Career statistics ==
Appearances and goals by club, season and competition
| Club | Season | League | | | FA Cup | | Total | |
| Club | Season | Division | Apps | Goals | Apps | Goals | Apps | Goals |
|---|---|---|---|---|---|---|---|---|
| Brentford | 1925–26 | Third Division South | 7 | 0 | 1 | 0 | 8 | 0 |
| Career total | | | 7 | 0 | 1 | 0 | 8 | 0 |
