= John Kennedy (public servant) =

Australian public servant

Controller-General of the Department of Trade and Customs
- In office 6 July 1944 – 6 February 1949

Personal details
- Born: John Joseph Francis Kennedy; 7 February 1884 Leichhardt, Sydney
- Occupation: Public servant

John Joseph Francis Kennedy (7 February 1884 – ?) was a senior Australian public servant. He was Controller-General of the Department of Trade and Customs between 1944 and 1949.

== Life and career ==
Kennedy was born on 7 February 1884 in Leichhardt, Sydney and was educated at Christian Brothers' High School, Lewisham. He began his Commonwealth Public Service career as a junior clerk in the Postmaster-General's Department, but transferred the next year to the Department of Trade and Customs.

After holding an appointment as sub-controller of Customs at Sydney for some time, Kennedy was appointed customs collector at Point Adelaide in 1934. He left Adelaide in 1936 when appointed customs collector in Victoria.

In November 1943, Kennedy was appointed Assistant Controller-General (administrative). From 6 July 1944 to his retirement on 6 February 1949, Kennedy was Head of the Department of Trade and Customs. Kennedy's retirement dinner was held at the Federal Hotel and attendees included Senator Ben Courtice, then Minister for Trade and Customs. As a retirement present, he was presented with a fishing kit, including waders, rods, reels and hooks.

Government offices
Preceded by Edwin Abbott	Controller-General of the Department of Trade and Customs; 1944 – 1949	Succeeded by Bill Turner
