= Bill Finlayson =

Scottish footballer (1899–1979)

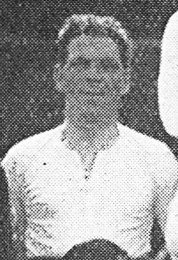
- Finlayson while with Brentford in 1925.

Personal information
- Full name: William Finlayson
- Date of birth: 29 March 1899
- Place of birth: Thornliebank, Scotland
- Date of death: 4 June 1965 (aged 66)
- Place of death: Montreal, Quebec, Canada
- Height: 5 ft 10 in (1.78 m)
- Position: Forward

Senior career*
Years	Team	Apps	(Gls)
1918–1919	Ashfield		
1919–1920	Thornliebank Juniors		
1920–1924	Chelsea	5	(1)
1924–1925	Clapton Orient	21	(2)
1925–1926	Brentford	21	(5)
1926	Springfield Babes	16	(1)
1926–1929	Providence Clamdiggers	113	(8)
1928	→ Montreal CNR (loan)	3	(0)
1929	→ Montreal CNR (loan)	2	(0)
1929–1930	Bethlehem Steel	17	(0)
1930	Montreal CNR	3	(0)
- * Club domestic league appearances and goals

William Finlayson (29 March 1899 – 4 June 1965) was a Scottish professional footballer who played as a forward in the Football League for Brentford, Clapton Orient and Chelsea. He later played in the United States and Canada. Finalyson's brother Bob was also a footballer and he played during the 1920s and 1930s.

== Career statistics ==
Appearances and goals by club, season and competition
Club	Season	League			National cup (Note: Includes FA Cup, National Challenge Cup)		League cup (Note: Includes American Soccer League Cup)		Total	
Club	Season	Division	Apps	Goals	Apps	Goals	Apps	Goals	Apps	Goals
Chelsea	1921–22	First Division	1	0	0	0	—		1	0
Chelsea	1923–24	First Division	4	1	0	0	—		4	1
Chelsea	Total		5	1	0	0	—		5	1
Brentford	1925–26	Third Division South	7	0	1	0	—		8	0
Springfield Babes	1926–27	American Soccer League	16	1	—		—		16	1
Providence Clamdiggers	1926–27	American Soccer League	16	1	0	0	2	0	18	1
Providence Clamdiggers	1927–28	American Soccer League	51	5	2	0	0	0	53	5
Providence Clamdiggers	1928–29	American Soccer League	44	3	0	0	0	0	46	3
Providence Clamdiggers	Total		111	9	2	0	2	0	115	9
Montreal CNR (loan)	1928	Canadian National Soccer League	3	0	—		—		3	0
Montreal CNR (loan)	1929	Canadian National Soccer League	2	0	—		—		2	0
Bethlehem Steel	1930	Atlantic Coast Soccer League	17	0	5	0	—		17	0
Montreal CNR	1930	Canadian National Soccer League	3	0	—		—		3	0
Montreal CNR	Total		8	0	—		—		8	0
Career total			164	11	8	0	2	0	174	11
