= Ernest Thomas Hall =

Australian public servant

Ernest Thomas Hall CBE

Controller-General of the Department of Trade and Customs
- In office 1927–1933

Personal details
- Occupation: Public servant

Ernest Thomas Hall was a senior Australian public servant. He was Controller-General of the Department of Trade and Customs between 1927 and 1933.

== Life and career ==
Hall entered the Victorian Customs department in 1888. He was private secretary to several State Ministers. He was licensed under Victorian law as a shorthand writer in 1890.

At federation, Hall transferred to the federal Department of Trade and Customs.

In 1916, Hall traveled to the United States, tasked with opening the Australian Customs Office in New York City and making extensive war supply purchases. On his return in 1920, he was appointed Collector of Customs in Adelaide.

In December 1924, Hall was appointed to the newly created position of Assistant Comptroller-General of Customs. He served in the role until March 1927 when he was appointed Chairman of the Tariff Board.

When Customs Comptroller-General Robert McKeeman Oakley died in August 1927, Hall began acting in his position. He resigned his position at the Tariff Board in October 1927. His appointment as permanent Comptroller-General was confirmed in March 1928.

Hall retired from the position of Comptroller in 1933, due to poor health. The Minister for Trade and Customs Thomas White paid tribute to Hall's valuable and able administration.

== Awards ==
Hall was made a Commander of the Order of the British Empire in June 1929.

Government offices
Preceded by Robert McKeeman Oakley	Controller-General of the Department of Trade and Customs; 1927–1933	Succeeded by Edwin Abbott
