= Nicholas Lockyer (public servant) =

Australian public servant (1855–1933)

Sir Nicholas Lockyer CBE ISO

Comptroller-General of the Department of Trade and Customs
- In office 1911–1913

Personal details
- Born: Nicholas Colston Lockyer; 6 October 1855 Woolloomooloo, Sydney, Colony of New South Wales
- Died: 26 August 1933 (aged 77)
- Occupation: Public servant

Sir Nicholas Colston Lockyer CBE ISO (6 October 1855 – 26 August 1933) was a senior Australian public servant, best known for his time as head of the Department of Trade and Customs.

== Life and career ==
Lockyer was born in Woolloomooloo, Sydney on 6 October 1855. His first marriage was to Mary Juliet, daughter of Geoffrey Eagar, from 1885 to her death in 1898. In 1901, he married Winifred, the daughter of Harry Wollaston.

Between 1911 and 1913, Lockyer was Comptroller-General of Customs and head of the Department of Trade and Customs.

Lockyer died at his home in Toorak, Melbourne, on 26 August 1933.

== Awards ==
Lockyer was awarded an Imperial Service Order in July 1906 whilst Collector of Customs for New South Wales. He was created a Commander of the Order of the British Empire in October 1918, and made a Knight Bachelor in January 1926.

Government offices
Preceded by Harry Wollaston	Comptroller-General of the Department of Trade and Customs; 1911 – 1913	Succeeded by Stephen Mills
