= Stephen Mills (public servant) =

Australian public servant (1857–1948)

Stephen Mills CMG

Comptroller-General of the Department of Trade and Customs
- In office 15 September 1913 – 22 September 1922

Personal details
- Born: 23 September 1857 Sydney
- Died: 1 November 1948 (aged 91) Glen Iris, Melbourne
- Spouse: Alice Maud Hudson (m. 1890)
- Occupation: Public servant

Stephen Mills CMG (23 September 1857 – 1 November 1948) was a senior Australian public servant, best known for his long association with the Department of Trade and Customs.

== Life and career ==
Stephen Mills was born in Sydney on 23 September 1857 to parents Emily and John Mills.

Between 1913 and 1922, Mills was Comptroller-General of the Department of Trade and Customs.

Mills died on 1 November 1948, in Glen Iris, Melbourne and was cremated.

== Awards ==
In June 1920, Mills was appointed a Companion of the Order of St Michael and St George, for his service as Controller-General of the Trade and Customs Department.

Government offices
Preceded by Nicholas Lockyer	Comptroller-General of the Department of Trade and Customs; 1913 – 1922	Succeeded by Percy Whitton
