= Jack Beacham =

English footballer

- Beacham with Brentford in 1926.

Personal information
- Full name: Albert John Beacham
- Date of birth: 15 August 1902
- Place of birth: Birmingham, England
- Date of death: 14 May 1982 (aged 79)
- Place of death: Birmingham, England
- Position: Half back

Senior career*
Years	Team	Apps	(Gls)
- Wolseley Motors
1924–1925	Weymouth		
1925–1929	Brentford	62	(2)
1929–1932	Gillingham	109	(0)
1932–19??	Worcester City		
- Evesham Town
- * Club domestic league appearances and goals

Albert John Beacham (15 August 1902 – 14 May 1982) was an English professional footballer who made over 170 appearances in the Football League for Brentford and Gillingham as a half back.

== Career statistics ==
Appearances and goals by club, season and competition
Club	Season	League			FA Cup		Total	
Club	Season	Division	Apps	Goals	Apps	Goals	Apps	Goals
Brentford	1925–26	Third Division South	4	1	0	0	4	1
Brentford	1926–27	Third Division South	14	0	6	0	20	0
Brentford	1927–28	Third Division South	29	1	1	0	30	1
Brentford	1928–29	Third Division South	15	0	0	0	15	0
Brentford	Total		62	3	7	0	69	3
Gillingham	1929–30	Third Division South	35	0	1	0	36	0
Gillingham	1930–31	Third Division South	36	0	2	1	38	1
Gillingham	1931–32	Third Division South	38	0	1	0	39	0
Gillingham	Total		109	0	4	1	113	1
Career Total			171	3	11	1	182	4
