= Robert McKeeman Oakley =

Australian public servant

Robert Oakley CBE

Comptroller-General of the Department of Trade and Customs
- In office 1 May 1923 – 7 March 1927

Personal details
- Born: Robert McKeeman Oakley; 28 March 1871 Warrnambool, Victoria
- Died: 27 August 1927 (aged 56) Elsternwick, Melbourne, Victoria
- Resting place: Cheltenham cemetery
- Spouse(s): Serena Laura Blamey (m. 1896–1927; his death)
- Occupation: Public servant

Robert McKeeman Oakley CBE (28 March 1871 – 27 August 1927) was a senior Australian public servant. He was Comptroller-General of Customs between 1923 and 1927.

== Life and career ==
Oakley was born in Warrnambool, Victoria on 28 March 1871 to parents Elizabeth Oakley (née McKeeman) and Thomas Oakley.

Oakley was an officer in the Victorian Artillery Garrison from 1892 to 1902.

In 1889, he joined the Victorian Customs Department as a Clerk, and became a Commonwealth public servant in 1901 when the Federal Department of Trade and Customs was formed.

Between May 1923 and his retirement in March 1927, Oakley was Comptroller-General of the Department of Trade and Customs.

Oakley died suddenly of angina pectorisat his home in Melbourne on 27 August 1927. He left in his will funds, the income of which was to provide a scholarship or bursary at Queen's College, University of Melbourne.

== Awards ==
Oakley was created a Commander of the Order of the British Empire in June 1923 whilst Deputy Comptroller-General in the Department of Trade and Customs.

Government offices
Preceded by Percy Whitton	Comptroller-General of the Department of Trade and Customs; 1923 – 1927	Succeeded by Ernest Thomas Hall
