= James Donnelly (footballer) =

Irish footballer and manager

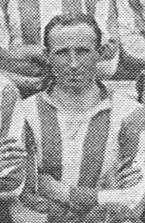
- Donnelly while with Brentford in 1926.

Personal information
- Full name: James Elliot Donnelly
- Date of birth: 18 December 1893
- Place of birth: Ballina, County Mayo, Ireland
- Date of death: 3 June 1959 (aged 65)
- Place of death: England
- Height: 5 ft 11 in (1.80 m)
- Position: Full back

Senior career*
Years	Team	Apps	(Gls)
–1919	Royal Artillery		
1919–1922	Blackburn Rovers	8	(0)
1922–1924	Accrington Stanley	54	(0)
1924–1925	Southend United	42	(0)
1925–1928	Brentford	79	(1)
1928–1932	Thames	36	(3)
1953	Clitheroe		
Total		147	(4)

Managerial career
- 1933–1935: Građanski Zagreb
- 1935–1936: Güneş
- 1936–1937: Turkey
- 1938–1940: AFC Amsterdam
- 1944–1945: AFC Amsterdam
- 1953: Clitheroe (player-manager)
- * Club domestic league appearances and goals

James Elliot Donnelly (18 December 1893 – 3 June 1959) was an Irish professional football player and manager. As a player, he played as a full back in the Football League for Blackburn Rovers, Accrington Stanley, Southend United, Brentford and Thames. After his retirement as a player, Donnelly became a manager and coach and as part of an FA coaching programme, he was sent abroad and managed Građanski Zagreb, Turkey and Amsterdamsche FC. He also held coaching roles at Thames, in Belgium and at AS Ambrosiana-Inter.

== Personal life ==
Donnelly served in the Royal Artillery during the First World War.

He was married to Jane Isherwood.

== Career statistics ==
Appearances and goals by club, season and competition
Club	Season	League			National Cup		Total	
Club	Season	Division	Apps	Goals	Apps	Goals	Apps	Goals
Blackburn Rovers	1920–21	First Division	8	0	2	0	10	0
Southend United	1924–25	Third Division South	42	0	3	0	45	0
Brentford	1925–26	Third Division South	39	0	2	0	41	0
Brentford	1926-27	Third Division South	39	1	5	0	44	1
Brentford	1927–28	Third Division South	1	0	0	0	1	0
Brentford	Total		79	1	7	0	86	1
Career total			129	1	12	0	131	1
