= James McClennon =

English footballer

Personal information
- Full name: James William McClennon
- Date of birth: 16 December 1900
- Place of birth: Tynemouth, England
- Date of death: 1971 (aged 70–71)
- Height: 5 ft 8 in (1.73 m)
- Position: Full back

Senior career*
Years	Team	Apps	(Gls)
- Walker Celtic
1923–1924	Grimsby Town	11	(0)
1925–1926	Brentford	24	(0)
- Walker Celtic
- West Stanley
- * Club domestic league appearances and goals

James William McClennon (16 December 1900 – 1971) was an English professional footballer who played in the Football League for Brentford and Grimsby Town as a full back.

== Career statistics ==
Appearances and goals by club, season and competition
Club	Season	League			FA Cup		Total	
Club	Season	Division	Apps	Goals	Apps	Goals	Apps	Goals
Brentford	1925–26	Third Division South	24	0	2	0	26	0
Career total			24	0	2	0	26	0
