= Percy Whitton =

Australian public servant

Percy Whitton ISO

Comptroller-General of the Department of Trade and Customs
- In office October 1922 – March 1923

Personal details
- Born: 28 January 1861 Hobart, Tasmania
- Died: 14 March 1923 (aged 62) Armadale, Melbourne, Victoria
- Children: Ivo Whitton
- Occupation: Public servant

Percy Whitton ISO (28 January 1861 – 14 March 1923) was a senior Australian public servant. He was Comptroller-General of the Department of Trade and Customs between October 1922 and his death in March 1923.

== Life and career ==
Whitton was born in Hobart, Tasmania on 28 January 1861.

In 1902, Whitton transferred to the Commonwealth Audit Office and worked under its first Auditor-General John William Israel.

In 1910 he was appointed Collector of Customs for Victoria, a job in which he stayed until 1917 when he became Chief Prices Commissioner under the War Precautions Act.

In October 1922 he took up the position of Comptroller-General of Customs.

On 14 March 1923, Whitton suffered a heart attack and died in his sleep at his home on Munro Street, Armadale in Melbourne.

== Awards ==
Whitton was appointed a Companion of the Imperial Service Order in June 1918 whilst Commonwealth Collector of Customs in Victoria.

Government offices
Preceded by Stephen Mills	Comptroller-General of the Department of Trade and Customs; 1922 – 1923	Succeeded by Robert McKeeman Oakley
