= Jimmy Walton =

English footballer (1898–1989)

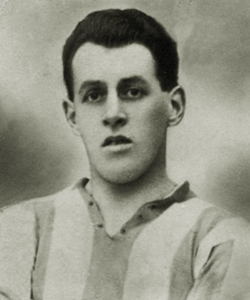
- Walton while with Leeds United in 1923.

Personal information
- Full name: James Walton
- Date of birth: 3 November 1898
- Place of birth: Sacriston, England
- Date of death: 26 August 1989 (aged 90)
- Place of death: Altrincham, England
- Height: 5 ft 9 in (1.75 m)
- Position: Left half

Senior career*
Years	Team	Apps	(Gls)
- Cleator Moor Celtic
1919–1920	West Stanley		
1920–1923	Leeds United	69	(4)
1923–1924	Bristol Rovers	40	(1)
1924–1926	Brentford	59	(0)
1926–1927	Hartlepools United	2	(0)
- * Club domestic league appearances and goals

James Walton (3 November 1898 – 26 August 1989) was an English professional footballer who played as a left half in the Football League for Leeds United, Brentford, Bristol Rovers and Hartlepools United.

== Career statistics ==
Appearances and goals by club, season and competition
Club	Season	League			FA Cup		Total	
Club	Season	Division	Apps	Goals	Apps	Goals	Apps	Goals
Leeds United	1920–21	Second Division	41	1	0	0	41	1
Leeds United	1921–22	Second Division	17	1	1	0	18	1
Leeds United	1922–23	Second Division	11	2	1	0	12	2
Leeds United	Total		69	4	2	0	71	4
Brentford	1924–25	Third Division South	23	0	1	0	24	0
Brentford	1925–26	Third Division South	36	0	1	0	37	0
Brentford	Total		59	0	2	0	61	0
Hartlepools United	1926–27	Third Division North	2	0	0	0	2	0
Career total			130	4	4	0	134	4
