= Bert Young =

English footballer

Personal information
- Full name: Herbert Young
- Date of birth: 4 September 1899
- Place of birth: Liverpool, England
- Date of death: 1 May 1976 (aged 76)
- Place of death: Liverpool, England
- Height: 5 ft 7 in (1.70 m)
- Position: Outside left

Youth career
- St Simon and St Jude
- Orwell Wednesday

Senior career*
Years	Team	Apps	(Gls)
1921–1923	Everton	0	(0)
1923–1925	Aberdare Athletic	68	(5)
1925–1927	Brentford	33	(2)
1926	→ Bangor City (loan)		
1927–1928	Newport County	64	(6)
1929–1930	Queens Park Rangers	14	(1)
1930–1932	Bristol Rovers	75	(11)
1932–1933	Swindon Town	14	(2)
Total		268	(27)
- * Club domestic league appearances and goals

Herbert Young (4 September 1899 – 1 May 1976) was an English professional footballer who made over 260 appearances as an outside left in the Football League for Aberdare Athletic, Brentford, Newport County, Queens Park Rangers, Bristol Rovers and Swindon Town.

== Playing career ==
Young began his career as an outside left at First Division club Everton, before dropping down to the Third Division South to sign for Aberdare Athletic in 1923. He moved to Third Division South strugglers Brentford in February 1925 and later moved to Wales to play for Bangor City and Newport County, before returning to London to join Third Division South club Queens Park Rangers in June 1929. He finished his career with spells at Bristol Rovers and Swindon Town.

== Career statistics ==
Appearances and goals by club, season and competition
Club	Season	League			FA Cup		Total	
Club	Season	Division	Apps	Goals	Apps	Goals	Apps	Goals
Brentford	1924–25	Third Division South	11	0	—		11	0
Brentford	1925–26	Third Division South	22	2	1	0	23	2
Brentford	Total		33	2	1	0	34	2
Queens Park Rangers	1929–30	Third Division South	14	1	1	0	15	1
Bristol Rovers	1930–31	Third Division South	40	7	2	0	42	7
Bristol Rovers	1931–32	Third Division South	35	4	2	0	37	4
Bristol Rovers	Total		75	11	4	0	77	11
Swindon Town	1932–33	Third Division South	14	2	0	0	14	2
Career Total			136	16	6	0	142	16
