= Harry Rae =

Scottish footballer

Henry Rae
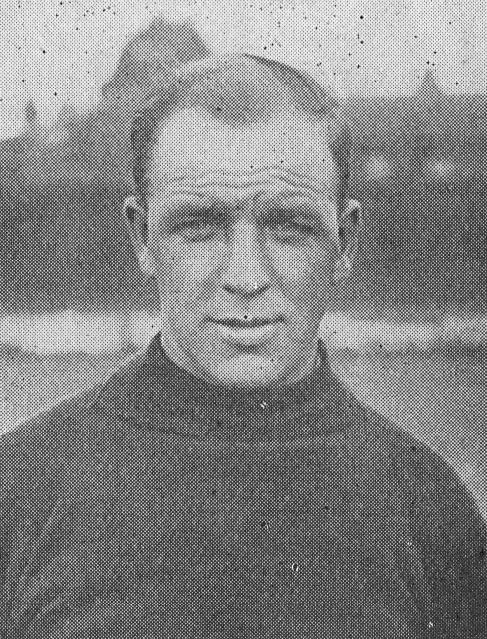

Personal information
- Full name: Henry Simons Rae
- Date of birth: 22 October 1895
- Place of birth: Partick, Scotland
- Date of death: 2 November 1967 (aged 72)
- Place of death: Glasgow, Scotland
- Position: Half back

Senior career*
Years	Team	Apps	(Gls)
1914–1917	Benburb		
1917–1925	Clyde	189	(21)
1918–1919	→ Morton (loan)	6	(5)
1923	→ Third Lanark (loan)		
1925–1927	Brentford	67	(6)
1927–1928	Hamilton Academical	7	(0)
- * Club domestic league appearances and goals

Henry Simons Rae (22 October 1895 – 2 November 1967) was a Scottish professional footballer who played professionally as a half back in Scotland and England for Clyde, Brentford, Hamilton Academical and Morton. He was a part of the Third Lanark team which toured South America in 1923. After retiring as a player, Rae served Ayr United, Clyde and Hibernian as trainer and later acted as Brentford's Scotland scout.

== Career statistics ==
Appearances and goals by club, season and competition
Club	Season	League			National Cup		Total	
Club	Season	Division	Apps	Goals	Apps	Goals	Apps	Goals
Clyde	1917–18	Scottish Division One	33	6	—		33	6
Clyde	1919–20	Scottish Division One	22	0	1	0	23	0
Clyde	1920–21	Scottish Division One	42	2	5	1	47	3
Clyde	1921–22	Scottish Division One	37	7	4	1	41	8
Clyde	1922–23	Scottish Division One	23	3	1	0	24	3
Clyde	1923–24	Scottish Division One	32	3	3	0	35	3
Clyde	Total		189	21	14	2	203	23
Morton (loan)	1918–19	Scottish Division One	6	5	—		6	5
Brentford	1925–26	Third Division South	37	4	1	0	38	4
Brentford	1926–27	Third Division South	30	2	8	0	38	2
Brentford	Total		67	6	9	0	76	6
Hamilton Academical	1927–28	Scottish Division One	7	0	0	0	7	0
Career Total			269	32	23	2	292	34
