= Alex Graham (footballer) =

Scottish footballer (1889–1972)

Personal information
- Full name: Alexander Graham
- Date of birth: 11 July 1889
- Place of birth: Galston, Scotland
- Date of death: 9 August 1972 (aged 83)
- Place of death: Islington, England
- Height: 5 ft 9 in (1.75 m)
- Position: Half back

Senior career*
Years	Team	Apps	(Gls)
- Hurlford United
- Larkhall United
- Larkhall Thistle
1911–1924	Arsenal	166	(17)
- → Vale of Leven (guest)
1917–1918	→ Hamilton Academical (guest)	44	(22)
1918–1919	→ Third Lanark (guest)	26	(0)
1919	→ Hamilton Academical (guest)	1	(0)
1924–1926	Brentford	47	(10)
- Folkestone

International career
1921	Scotland	1	(0)

Managerial career
- 1925–1926: Brentford (assistant)
- Folkestone (player-manager)
- Botwell Mission
- * Club domestic league appearances and goals

Graham while with Brentford in 1925.

Alexander Graham (11 July 1889 – 9 August 1972) was a Scottish professional football half back, best remembered for his time with in the Football League with Arsenal either side of the First World War.

== Playing career ==
=== Early years ===
Graham was born in Galston, Ayrshire and started playing for local club Hurlford United before moving to Lanarkshire where he played for Larkhall United and Larkhall Thistle.

=== Arsenal ===
Graham was taken on trial by Woolwich Arsenal in December 1911 and was signed permanently the following January. After a year in the reserves he made his debut in a First Division match on 25 December 1912 against Notts County and played another 14 games that season. Graham either played at centre half or left half, at first mainly deputising for more established players such as Angus McKinnon.

By 1914–15, with Woolwich Arsenal now relegated to the Second Division, Graham had become a regular, but World War I brought with it the suspension of League football in England. Graham left Woolwich Arsenal to return to his native Scotland, where he guested for Vale of Leven, Hamilton Academical (two spells) and Third Lanark. After football in England resumed in 1919, he re-signed for Arsenal (who had won back promotion to the First Division) and retook his regular place at centre half. He was a regular for Arsenal's first three seasons after the war (from 1919 until 1922), but the arrival of Jack Butler meant Graham had competition for his place and at the start of 1922–23 he lost his regular centre half berth, though he continued to be used as a bit-part player deputising in other half-back positions for that season and the next one. He played 179 times for Arsenal in total, scoring 20 goals (many of them penalties) and departed Highbury in December 1924.

=== Brentford ===
Graham joined Third Division South club Brentford in December 1924 for a £450 fee. He played 49 matches, scored 11 goals and also became player/assistant manager to Fred Halliday prior to the beginning of the 1925–26 season. He left Griffin Park following the appointment of Harry Curtis in May 1926.

== International career ==
Graham won a single international cap for Scotland, in a 2–0 win against Ireland on 26 February 1921.

== Managerial career ==
Graham had a player-manager spell at Southern League side Folkestone and later managed Botwell Mission.

== Personal life ==
Graham worked as a miner during World War I and later ran a confectionery and tobacco shop on Brentford High Street. He died at Whittington Hospital, Islington, in August 1972.
