= Brierley Hill Alliance F.C. =

Brierley Hill Alliance
- Full name: Brierley Hill Alliance Football Club
- Nickname: the Lions
- Founded: 1887
- Dissolved: June 1981
- Ground: Labour In Vain Ground (1887–1888); Cottage Street (1888–1977); The Dell (1977–1981)
- 1980–81: West Midlands (Regional) League Premier Division, 21st
Final colours

Brierley Hill Alliance F.C. was an English association football club based in Brierley Hill in the West Midlands.

== History ==
Formed in 1887 from a merger of Brockmoor Harriers and Brockmoor Pickwicks, the club joined the Birmingham & District League in 1890 and the team were league champions on two occasions and runners-up on four occasions. The club was also notable for being involved in the first ever FA Cup match to be played under floodlights, when they took on Kidderminster Harriers in September 1955, losing the preliminary round replay 4–2.

Alliance also won the Birmingham Senior Cup in 1932–33, 1936–37, 1951–52 and 1952–53.

== Colours ==
The club had various colour schemes over the years, originally wearing blue and white stripes, which morphed into blue and white quarters in the 1950s, worn until at least 1962. In the early 1970s the club wore all red, but by 1972–73 had adopted white shirts with black shorts and black/white stockings.

== Ground ==
The club began at Brockmoor Harriers' Labour In Vain ground in Moor Street, then moved to Cottage Street during the 1888–89 season; in 1893 the club bought the grandstand from the now-defunct Wednesbury Old Athletic. This was their home until 1977: it is now a supermarket car park. Alliance moved to The Dell which was their home until the club folded in June 1981.

== Former players ==
1. Players that have played/managed in the Football League or any foreign equivalent to this level (i.e. fully professional league).
2. Players with full international caps.
3. Players that hold a club record.

- (England) Cecil Blakemore – played in the Football League
- (England) Harry Hancock – played in the Football League
- (Scotland) Andrew Smith – played in the Football League and the Scottish League
- (England) Harry Stanford – played in the Football League
