= Alan Noble (footballer) =

English footballer

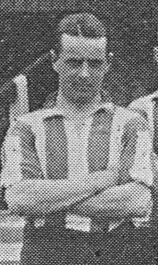
- Noble while with Brentford in 1926.

Personal information
- Full name: Alan Hugh Noble
- Date of birth: 19 June 1900
- Place of birth: Southampton, England
- Date of death: 1973 (aged 72–73)
- Height: 5 ft 8 in (1.73 m)
- Positions: Outside right; right half

Senior career*
Years	Team	Apps	(Gls)
1920–1921	Southampton	0	(0)
1921–1922	Boscombe		
1922–1925	Leeds United	60	(4)
1925–1927	Brentford	41	(0)
1927–1928	Millwall	4	(0)
- * Club domestic league appearances and goals

Alan Hugh Noble (19 June 1900 – 1973), sometimes known as Smiler Noble, was an English professional footballer who played as an outside right and right half in the Football League for Leeds United, Brentford and Millwall.

== Career statistics ==
Appearances and goals by club, season and competition
Club	Season	League			FA Cup		Total	
Club	Season	Division	Apps	Goals	Apps	Goals	Apps	Goals
Leeds United	1922–23	Second Division	28	1	3	0	31	1
Leeds United	1923–24	Second Division	21	2	0	0	21	2
Leeds United	1924–25	First Division	11	1	0	0	11	1
Leeds United	Total		60	4	3	0	63	4
Brentford	1925–26	Third Division South	31	0	1	0	32	0
Brentford	1926–27	Third Division South	10	0	2	0	12	0
Brentford	Total		41	0	3	0	44	0
Millwall	1927–28	Third Division South	4	0	0	0	4	0
Career Total			105	4	6	0	111	4
