= Percival Whitton =

English footballer

Percy Whitton
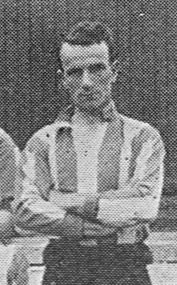
- Whitton with Brentford in 1926.

Personal information
- Full name: Percival Albert Whitton
- Date of birth: 14 January 1892
- Place of birth: Creech St Michael, England
- Date of death: 9 October 1974 (aged 82)
- Place of death: Bristol, England
- Positions: Full back; centre forward

Youth career
- –1918: Taunton Town

Senior career*
Years	Team	Apps	(Gls)
1918–1920	Bristol Rovers	29	(1)
1920–1921	Bridgend Town		
1921–1922	Aberaman Athletic		
1922–1925	Newport County	78	(6)
1925–1927	Brentford	25	(5)
- * Club domestic league appearances and goals

Percival Albert Whitton (14 January 1892 – 9 October 1974) was an English professional footballer who played as a full back and centre forward in the Football League for Brentford and Newport County.

== Career statistics ==
Appearances and goals by club, season and competition
Club	Season	League			FA Cup		Other		Total	
Club	Season	Division	Apps	Goals	Apps	Goals	Apps	Goals	Apps	Goals
Bristol Rovers	1919–20	Southern League First Division	29	1	0	0	1 (Note: Appearance in Gloucester Cup)	0	30	1
Brentford	1925–26	Third Division South	25	5	2	2	―		27	7
Career Total			54	6	2	2	1	0	57	8
