= John Thomson (footballer, born 1896) =

Scottish footballer

- Thomson while with Brentford in 1925.

Personal information
- Full name: John Youngman Thomson
- Date of birth: 27 July 1896
- Place of birth: Greenock, Scotland
- Date of death: May 1980 (aged 83)
- Place of death: Westchester County, New York, United States
- Height: 6 ft 0 in (1.83 m)
- Position: Goalkeeper

Youth career
- Caledonian Juniors
- –1921: Benburb

Senior career*
Years	Team	Apps	(Gls)
1921–1922	Bristol Rovers	5	(0)
1922	Aberaman Athletic		
1922–1923	Alloa Athletic	35	(0)
1923–1925	Partick Thistle	28	(0)
1924–1925	Aberdare Athletic	20	(0)
1925–1926	Brentford	40	(0)
1926–1927	Plymouth Argyle	7	(0)
1927–1928	Chesterfield	22	(0)
1928	Coventry City	3	(0)
- Aberdare Athletic
1928–1929	New York Nationals	0	(0)
1929	Nuneaton Town	1	(0)
- * Club domestic league appearances and goals

John Youngman Thomson (27 July 1896 – May 1980), sometimes known as Jack Thomson, was a Scottish professional footballer who made 97 appearances in the Football League for Brentford, Bristol Rovers, Plymouth Argyle, Chesterfield, Aberdare Athletic and Coventry City as a goalkeeper.

== Personal life ==
Thomson was brother-in-law to Bristol Rovers teammate David Steele. He served in the Royal Navy during the First World War. Thomson later emigrated with this wife to the United States and they lived in Brooklyn, where he worked as a yardman. He joined the United States Army Reserve in December 1936 and served through the Second World War. At the time of his death in May 1980, Thomson was living in Ossining, New York.

== Career statistics ==
Appearances and goals by club, season and competition
Club	Season	League			National cup (Note: Includes FA Cup, Scottish Cup)		Other		Total	
Club	Season	Division	Apps	Goals	Apps	Goals	Apps	Goals	Apps	Goals
Bristol Rovers	1921–22	Third Division South	5	0	1	0	—		6	0
Alloa Athletic	1922–23	Scottish First Division	35	0	1	0	—		36	0
Partick Thistle	1923–24	Scottish First Division	28	0	5	0	—		33	0
Brentford	1925–26	Third Division South	40	0	2	0	—		42	0
Plymouth Argyle	1926–27	Third Division South	7	0	0	0	—		7	0
Chesterfield	1927–28	Third Division North	22	0	1	0	—		23	0
Coventry City	1927–28	Third Division South	3	0	—		—		3	0
Nuneaton Town	1928–29	Birmingham Combination	1	0	—		1 (Note: Appearance in Nuneaton Charity Cup)	0	2	0
Career Total			141	0	10	0	1	0	152	0

== Honours ==
Nuneaton Town

- Nuneaton Charity Cup: 1929–30
