= 1945–46 Colchester United F.C. season =

Colchester United
1945–46 season
- Chairman: Bill Allen
- Manager: Syd Fieldus (until April 1946)
- Stadium: Layer Road
- Southern League: 8th
- FA Cup: 4th Qualifying Round (eliminated by Wisbech Town)
- Top goalscorer: League: Chris Harman (4); All: Bob Hodgson (5)
- Highest home attendance: 5,206 v Chelmsford City, 1 September 1945
- Lowest home attendance: 2,665 v Swindon Town Reserves, 23 February 1946
- Average home league attendance: 3,858
- Biggest win: 5–0 v Barry Town, 9 February 1946
- Biggest defeat: 0–8 v Yeovil & Petters United, 22 September 1945; v Bath City, 2 February 1946
Home colours

The 1945–46 season was Colchester United's fourth season in their history and their fourth in the Southern League. It was also their first since the end of World War II hostilities. Alongside competing in the Southern League, the club also participated in the FA Cup and Southern League Cup. Relying heavily on guest appearances of players from other clubs, Colchester United finished in 8th position in the Southern League, with a total of 81 different players registering appearances over the course of the season.

== Season overview ==
The determination of a number of club directors and former player Syd Fieldus saw the club remain alive yet dormant during the war years. Fieldus was appointed secretary-manager, and attended the first post-war Southern League meeting during the summer of 1945. Following late changes to the structure of the competitions, where a national league was created over an Eastern and Western division, the club were close to pulling out of the competition entirely, risking falling further down the football pyramid. However, the club were to remain after the supporters club pledged to fund an average of £50 required for away travel to the likes of Cardiff City, Hereford United and Worcester City.

Fieldus liaised with Major Dai Rees to forge a strong relationship with Colchester Garrison, as the club on sported four contracted players. The first-team was complemented by a number of servicemen of varying degrees of ability, which meant that by the end of the campaign, 81 different players were used to compete in only 31 league and cup games. Players were often registered just moments before a scheduled kick-off time. After competing in all 20 scheduled games for the season, Fieldus urged the board to appoint a full-time manager for the 1946–47 season.

== Players ==
As of match played 18 April 1946.

Name	Position	Nationality	Place of birth	Date of birth	Apps	Goals	Signed from	Date signed	Fee
Defenders
Bill Bower	FB	(Wales)	Wrexham	17 November 1911 (aged 33)	0	0	(England) Millwall	28 November 1945	Free transfer
Syd Fieldus	DF	(England)	Romford	27 May 1909 (aged 36)	23	3	(England) Brentford	3 July 1937	Free transfer
Jimmy Jenkins	CH				0	0	(England) Bristol City	20 July 1945	Free transfer
Paddy Shiels	FB	(Ireland)	Antrim		0	0	Colchester Garrison (No. 1 Holding Battalion)	3 November 1945 (Note: Date of signing refers to the date of the player's first game for the club)	Free transfer
Forwards
Bob Collins	OL	(England)			0	0	Colchester Garrison (No. 1 Holding Battalion Infantry Training Corps)	9 February 1946	Free transfer
Bob Gregg	CF	(England)	Ferryhill	4 February 1904 (aged 41)	0	0	(Republic of Ireland) Sligo Rovers	26 October 1945	Free transfer
Chris Harman	CF				0	0	(England) Bath City	25 August 1945	Free transfer
Bob Hodgson	CF				0	0	(England) South Shields	February 1946	Free transfer
Bobby Hoines	IR				0	0	Colchester Garrison (No. 1 Holding Battalion)	11 January 1946	Free transfer
Bob Hutchings	LW	(England)	Southwark		0	0	Colchester Garrison (No. 1 Holding Battalion)	9 February 1946	Free transfer
Frank Rawcliffe	CF	(England)	Blackburn	10 December 1921 (aged 23)	0	0	(England) Wolverhampton Wanderers	9 March 1946	Free transfer
Tom Tobin	IR	(Scotland)	Glasgow		0	0	Colchester Garrison	18 April 1946	Free transfer

== Transfers ==
=== In ===
Date	Position	Nationality	Name	From	Fee	Ref.
20 July 1945	CH		Jimmy Jenkins	(England) Bristol City	Free transfer	
10 August 1945	FB		W Milne	Colchester Garrison (16th Infantry Training Corps)	Free transfer	(Note: Date of signing refers to the date of the player's first game for the club)
10 August 1945	WG	(England)	Ronnie Hornby	Colchester Garrison (16th Infantry Training Corps)	Free transfer	
10 August 1945	IR		Wilmott	Colchester Garrison (No. 1 Holding Battalion)	Free transfer	
25 August 1945	CF		Chris Harman	(England) Bath City	Free transfer	
6 October 1945	LH		Percy Heal	Colchester Garrison (No. 1 Holding Battalion)	Free transfer	
6 October 1945	CH	(England)	O'Sullivan	Royal Air Force	Free transfer	
26 October 1945	CF	(England)	Bob Gregg	(Republic of Ireland) Sligo Rovers	Free transfer	
3 November 1945	FB	(Ireland)	Paddy Shiels	Colchester Garrison (No. 1 Holding Battalion)	Free transfer	
17 November 1945	CF	(England)	George Barnard	(England) West Ham United	Free transfer	
17 November 1945	GK		Bill Wilkie	(England) Crittall Athletic	Free transfer	
28 November 1945	FB	(Wales)	Bill Bower	(England) Millwall	Free transfer	
29 December 1945	CF	(England)	Ron Canham	Royal Air Force	Free transfer	
11 January 1946	IR		Bobby Hoines	Colchester Garrison (No. 1 Holding Battalion)	Free transfer	
February 1946	CF		Bob Hodgson	(England) South Shields	Free transfer	
9 February 1946	OL	(England)	Bob Collins	Colchester Garrison (No. 1 Holding Battalion Infantry Training Corps)	Free transfer	
9 February 1946	LW	(England)	Bob Hutchings	Colchester Garrison (No. 1 Holding Battalion)	Free transfer	
9 February 1946	WG	(England)	Righton	Colchester Garrison (16th Infantry Training Corps)	Free transfer	
23 February 1946	GK		Robert Brown	(England) West Ham United	Free transfer	
9 March 1946	CF	(England)	Frank Rawcliffe	(England) Wolverhampton Wanderers	Free transfer	
18 April 1946	IR	(Scotland)	Tom Tobin	Colchester Garrison	Free transfer	

=== Out ===
Date	Position	Nationality	Name	To	Fee	Ref.
1 September 1945	GK	(England)	Billy Light	Clacton Town	Player-manager	(Note: Date of departure refers to the date of the player's final game for the club)
6 October 1945	CH		O'Sullivan	Free agent	Released	
3 November 1945	FB		W Milne	Free agent	Released	
17 November 1945	GK		Bill Wilkie	Free agent	Released	
24 November 1945	CF	(England)	Ivan Thacker	(England) Lowestoft Town	Free transfer	
1 December 1945	WG	(England)	Ronnie Hornby	Free agent	Released	
29 December 1945	CF	(England)	Ron Canham	Free agent	Released	
19 January 1946	CF	(England)	George Barnard	(England) Arsenal	£800	
19 January 1946	IR		Wilmott	Free agent	Released	
February 1946	LH		Percy Heal	Free agent	Released	
16 February 1946	WG		Righton	Free agent	Released	
3 April 1946	GK		Robert Brown	Free agent	Released	

- Total incoming: ▲ ~ £800

=== Guest players ===
Date	Position	Nationality	Name	From	End date	Ref.
13 July 1945	WH	(Scotland)	David Nelson	(England) Arsenal	April 1946	
13 July 1945	IR		A Thompson	Colchester Garrison (No. 1 Holding Battalion)	29 September 1945	(Note: Guest end date refers to the date of the player's final game for the club)
20 July 1945	GK	(England)	Ray Dring	Colchester Garrison (17th Infantry Training Corps)	3 November 1945	
20 July 1945	FB	(England)	Jack Southam	(England) West Bromwich Albion	11 April 1946	
20 July 1945	CH		Ron West	Colchester Garrison (No. 1 Holding Battalion)	8 December 1945	
20 July 1945	WG	(England)	Albert Day	(England) Brighton & Hove Albion	11 April 1946	
20 July 1945	WG		Reeves	(Wales) Swansea City	10 November 1945	
27 July 1945	FB	(Wales)	Bill Bower	(England) Millwall	28 November 1945	
10 August 1945	GK		Peter Dawson	(England) Rowhedge	29 September 1945	
10 August 1945	FB	(England)	Doug Beach	(England) Luton Town	18 April 1946	(Note: Guest start and end dates refer to the date of the player's first and final games for the club)
10 August 1945	CF		Paddy Kernohan	Colchester Garrison (Army Fire Fighting Centre)	29 September 1945	
10 August 1945	WG	(England)	Stan Titcombe	(England) Swindon Town	16 May 1946	
22 August 1945	IR/CF		Godfrey	Colchester Garrison (17th Infantry Training Corps)	22 September 1945	
25 August 1945	CH		Robson	(England) York City	3 November 1945	
1 September 1945	IF	(England)	Jackie Robinson	(England) Sheffield Wednesday	24 November 1945	
8 September 1945	WH	(England)	Bobby Browne	(England) Leeds United	13 October 1945	
22 September 1945	LH		Bramhall	Colchester Garrison (Army Fire Fighting Centre)	22 September 1945	
22 September 1945	RH	(Scotland)	Gray	Colchester Garrison (Army Fire Fighting Centre)	22 September 1945	
22 September 1945	RH		Holmes	Colchester Garrison (Army Fire Fighting Centre)	22 September 1945	
22 September 1945	WG		Stanyon	Colchester Garrison (Army Fire Fighting Centre)	22 September 1945	
29 September 1945	LB	(Ireland)	Cecil Allan	(England) Colchester Casuals	29 September 1945	
29 September 1945	IR		Buckley	Colchester Garrison (No. 1 Holding Battalion)	29 September 1945	
29 September 1945	IL	(Scotland)	Jock Cameron	Colchester Garrison (Army Fire Fighting Centre)	29 September 1945	
29 September 1945	WG	(England)	Fred Inskip	(England) Nottingham Forest	29 September 1945	
6 October 1945	GK	(England)	Harry Brown	(England) Queens Park Rangers	18 April 1946	
6 October 1945	CF		Andrews	Unknown	6 October 1945	
6 October 1945	CF	(Wales)	Rod Williams	(England) West Ham United	13 October 1945	
10 November 1945	IF	(England)	Alf Smirk	(England) Southend United	9 February 1946	
17 November 1945	CB	(England)	Joe James	(England) Brentford	2 February 1946	
17 November 1945	CF	(England)	George Barnard	(England) West Ham United	17 November 1945	
24 November 1945	IL	(Scotland)	Jock Ferguson	Colchester Garrison (No. 1 Holding Battalion)	2 February 1946	
8 December 1945	FB	(England)	Sid Jones	(England) Arsenal	18 April 1946	
8 December 1945	OL		Bickmore	Colchester Garrison (No. 1 Holding Battalion)	8 December 1945	
8 December 1945	WG	(England)	Derek Hawksworth	(England) Bradford Park Avenue	12 January 1946	
15 December 1945	IF	(Wales)	Leslie Jones	(England) Arsenal	15 December 1945	
29 December 1945	FB	(Wales)	Charlie Jones	(England) Southend United	19 January 1946	
29 December 1945	IF	(England)	Billy Leighton	(England) Southend United	19 January 1946	
January 1946	GK	(England)	Alf Jefferies	(England) Oxford City	9 March 1946	
19 January 1946	IR	(England)	Len Townsend	(England) Brentford	19 January 1946	
2 February 1946	WG	(England)	Cliff Hubbard	Colchester Garrison (No. 1 Holding Battalion)	2 February 1946	
2 February 1946	WG	(England)	Ernest Steele	British Army	2 February 1946	
9 February 1946	GK		Alex Kingston	(England) Southampton	16 February 1946	
9 February 1946	CF	(England)	Frank Dudley	(England) Southend United	9 February 1946	
23 February 1946	CF	(England)	H Fletcher	Colchester Garrison	3 April 1946	
23 February 1946	CF	(England)	Frank Rawcliffe	(England) Wolverhampton Wanderers	9 March 1946	
23 February 1946	WG	(England)	Douglas Smale	(England) Chelsea	6 April 1946	
23 February 1946	OL	(England)	Johnny Westwood	(England) Tottenham Hotspur	23 February 1946	
16 March 1946	IF	(England)	Sid Bidewell	(England) Chelsea	13 April 1946	
3 April 1946	RH	(England)	Geoff Fox	(England) Ipswich Town	3 April 1946	
3 April 1946	CF	(England)	Len Duquemin	(England) Tottenham Hotspur	3 April 1946	

=== Loans in ===
Date	Position	Nationality	Name	From	End date	Ref.
29 December 1945	IR	(England)	Cecil Green	(England) Cheltenham Town	29 December 1945	(Note: Loan start and end dates refer to the date of the player's first and final games for the club)
26 January 1946	OR		Beveridge	(England) Worcester City	26 January 1946	
26 January 1946	LW		Hogg	(England) Worcester City	26 January 1946	
13 April 1946	LH	(England)	Harry Bamford	(England) Brentford	13 April 1946	
13 April 1946	CH		George Coulson	(England) Brentford	13 April 1946	
13 April 1946	FB	(Scotland)	Roddy Munro	(England) Brentford	13 April 1946	
13 April 1946	WG	(England)	Jim Gotts	(England) Brentford	13 April 1946	
13 April 1946	IF	(England)	Ernest Muttitt	(England) Brentford	13 April 1946	
13 April 1946	CF		John Sutton	(England) Brentford	13 April 1946	

== Match details ==
=== Friendlies ===
30 August 1945 Friendly	Colchester United	1–1	Ipswich Town	Colchester
18:00	Day	Report	Smythe	Stadium: Layer Road; Attendance: 3,525

8 September 1945 Friendly	Colchester United	2–1	Guildford City	Colchester
15:15	Beach 15' (pen.), 30'	Report	Green 2'	Stadium: Layer Road; Attendance: 2,875

10 September 1945 Friendly	Ipswich Town	2–1	Colchester United	Ipswich
15:00	Own goal 20'; Price 83'	Report	Hornby 36'	Stadium: Portman Road; Attendance: 8,420

20 October 1945 Friendly	Guildford City	5–3	Colchester United	Guildford
	McPheat 15', 37', 89'; Stock 35'; Lucas	Report	Harman 87'; Hornby	Stadium: St Joseph's Road; Attendance: 1,800

27 October 1945 Friendly	Colchester United	5–0	Tottenham Hotspur XI	Colchester
	Southam 25', 27'; Harman 34', 35'; Wilmott 55'	Report		Stadium: Layer Road; Attendance: 3,929

1 December 1945 Friendly	Colchester United	2–1	Arsenal XI	Colchester
14:30	Harman; Wilmott	Report	Jones 20'	Stadium: Layer Road; Attendance: 5,010

22 December 1945 Friendly	Gillingham	3–7	Colchester United	Gillingham
	Herbert; Temlett; Tukehurst	Report	Harman; Hawksworth; Barnard	Stadium: Priestfield Stadium

25 December 1945 Friendly	Colchester United	7–2	Colchester Junior League XI	Colchester
	Ferguson 3'; Harman; Barnard; Canham	Report	Naunton	Stadium: Layer Road; Referee: E. Vince

26 December 1945 Friendly	Colchester United	8–2	Short Sports (Rochester)	Colchester
	Barnard 17', 20'; Wilmott 65'; Harman; Hawksworth; Ferguson	Report	Foss; Kelly	Stadium: Layer Road

5 January 1946 Friendly	Colchester United	3–3	Ekco Sports	Colchester
14:15	Southam 12' (pen.); Titcombe	Report	Lewis 89'; West	Stadium: Layer Road; Attendance: 2,000

19 April 1946 Friendly	Colchester United	1–1	Brentford	Colchester
15:30	Rawcliffe	Report	Boulter 43'	Stadium: Layer Road; Attendance: 4,790; Referee: W. Lawrence

22 April 1946 Friendly	Colchester United	2–2	Norwich City	Colchester
15:30	Bower 22' (pen.); Own goal 25'	Report	Hutchinson 20'; Kingston 33' (o.g.)	Stadium: Layer Road; Attendance: 5,317

27 April 1946 Friendly	Ipswich Town Reserves	1–0	Colchester United	Ipswich
	Parker	Report		Stadium: Portman Road; Attendance: 6,000; Referee: W. Hillyard

4 May 1946 Friendly	Norwich City Reserves	4–1	Colchester United	Norwich
	Walker 1'; Methven 25'; Colley	Report	Hodgson 90'	Stadium: Carrow Road; Attendance: 1,063

=== Southern League ===
==== League table ====
Pos	Team	Pld	W	D	L	GF	GA	GR	Pts	Results
6	Yeovil & Petters United	18	7	1	10	57	52	1.096	18 (Note: Chelmsford City, Cheltenham Town, Yeovil & Petters and Swindon Town II awarded three points for two unfulfilled matches. Bedford Town awarded six points for four unfulfilled matches.)	
7	Worcester City	20	8	2	10	60	58	1.034	18	
8	Colchester United	20	7	3	10	29	47	0.617	17	
9	Bedford Town	16	4	1	11	30	49	0.612	15	
10	Swindon Town II	18	4	3	11	36	65	0.554	14	Resigned from the league

Source: rsssf.com
Rules for classification: 1) points; 2) goal ratio.
Notes:

The table contains an error as the goals for are 515 and the goals against are 513.

==== Matches ====
25 August 1945 1	Chelmsford City	1–2	Colchester United	Chelmsford
	Holliday 67'	Report	Titcombe 20'; Hornby 48'	Stadium: New Writtle Street; Attendance: 5,000

1 September 1945 2	Colchester United	3–4	Chelmsford City	Colchester
15:15	Reeves 10'; Robinson 25'; Harman 40'	Report	Foreman 55', 65'; Buchanan 75'	Stadium: Layer Road; Attendance: 5,206

15 September 1945 3	Bedford Town	2–0	Colchester United	Bedford
	Mulligan 70'; McCormack	Report		Stadium: Ford End Road

22 September 1945 4	Yeovil & Petters United	8–0	Colchester United	Yeovil
	Laing 25'; Hunt; Langley; Regan (pen.)	Report		Stadium: Huish Athletic Ground

29 September 1945 5	Colchester United	1–4	Bedford Town	Colchester
	Southam 5' (pen.)	Report	Flint 14'; Pope 45', 52'; Dellahay	Stadium: Layer Road; Attendance: 3,676

6 October 1945 6	Colchester United	1–0	Cheltenham Town	Colchester
	Hornby 8'	Report		Stadium: Layer Road; Attendance: 3,318

13 October 1945 7	Colchester United	1–0	Cardiff City Reserves	Colchester
15:15	Hornby 85'	Report		Stadium: Layer Road; Attendance: 4,554

10 November 1945 8	Colchester United	3–1	Bath City	Colchester
14:30	Smirk 20'; Harman 37'; Gregg 50' (pen.)	Report	Mitchell 75'	Stadium: Layer Road; Attendance: 3,949

17 November 1945 9	Hereford United	3–1	Colchester United	Hereford
	Shell 70', 80'; Brown	Report	Harman 60'	Stadium: Edgar Street; Attendance: 3,000

24 November 1945 10	Colchester United	2–1	Worcester City	Colchester
14:30	Robinson 26' (pen.), 35'	Report	Layton 60'	Stadium: Layer Road; Attendance: 4,294; Referee: R. Savage

8 December 1945 11	Barry Town	0–0	Colchester United	Barry
		Report		Stadium: Jenner Park Stadium

15 December 1945 12	Colchester United	3–3	Yeovil & Petters United	Colchester
14:15	Hawksworth 10'; Wilmott 15'; Barnard 30'	Report	Lewis 16'; Langley 75'; Hunt 78'	Stadium: Layer Road; Attendance: 4,135

29 December 1945 13	Cheltenham Town	1–0	Colchester United	Cheltenham
	Goring 25'	Report		Stadium: Whaddon Road

12 January 1946 14	Colchester United	0–3	Hereford United	Colchester
14:15		Report	Bowyer 5'; Blair 75'; Thompson 76'	Stadium: Layer Road

26 January 1946 15	Worcester City	6–2	Colchester United	Worcester
	Sheveling 14'; James (o.g.); Brown; Duggan; Layton	Report	Beach	Stadium: St George's Lane

2 February 1946 16	Bath City	8–0	Colchester United	Bath
	Davies 48'; Browne; Caldwell; Mustard	Report		Stadium: Twerton Park

9 February 1946 17	Colchester United	5–0	Barry Town	Colchester
	Dudley 5', 20'; Righton; Harman 46'; Collins 75'	Report		Stadium: Layer Road; Attendance: 2,896; Referee: R. Savage

16 February 1946 18	Swindon Town Reserves	1–0	Colchester United	Swindon
	Hardman 78'	Report		Stadium: County Ground; Attendance: 1,769

23 February 1946 19	Colchester United	5–1	Swindon Town Reserves	Colchester
	Hodgson 18', 28'; Smale; Westwood; Jones	Report	Higgs 17'	Stadium: Layer Road; Attendance: 2,665

16 March 1946 20	Cardiff City Reserves	0–0	Colchester United	Colchester
15:15		Report		Stadium: Layer Road; Attendance: 3,944

=== FA Cup ===
3 November 1945 4th qualifying round	Wisbech Town	5–0	Colchester United	Wisbech
	Pownall 8', 23'; Corry 26', 42'; Roberts 82'	Report		Stadium: Fenland Stadium; Attendance: 2,748

=== Southern League Cup ===
19 January 1946 1	Colchester United	3–1	Guildford City	Colchester
	Townsend 7', 60', 88'	Report	Hawkes 15'	Stadium: Layer Road; Attendance: 3,843

9 March 1946 2	Cheltenham Town	0–1	Colchester United	Cheltenham
		Report	Hodgson 30'	Stadium: Whaddon Road

23 March 1946 3	Colchester United	2–0	Swindon Town Reserves	Colchester
15:15	Bidewell 14'; Smale 70'	Report		Stadium: Layer Road; Attendance: 3,907

28 March 1946 4	Bedford Town	2–2	Colchester United	Bedford
17:00	Unknown goalscorer	Report	Rawcliffe; Bidewell	Stadium: The Eyrie

30 March 1946 5	Colchester United	3–3	Cheltenham Town	Colchester
15:15	Shiels 35'; Bidewell	Report	Goring 1', 24'; Parris 85'	Stadium: Layer Road; Referee: G. Clack

3 April 1946 6	Chelmsford City	2–0	Colchester United	Chelmsford
	Foreman 20'; Burley 46'	Report		Stadium: New Writtle Street; Attendance: 6,000

6 April 1946 7	Swindon Town Reserves	4–2	Colchester United	Swindon
	Higgs 20', 85', 86'; Wells 80'	Report	Hodgson 44'; Rawcliffe 81'	Stadium: County Ground

11 April 1946 8	Colchester United	1–1	Chelmsford City	Swindon
	Collins	Report	Unknown goalscorer	Stadium: County Ground

13 April 1946 9	Guildford City	2–5	Colchester United	Guildford
	Davies; Elmwood	Report	Sutton 15', 61', 80'; Bamford 89' (pen.); Rawcliffe	Stadium: St Joseph's Road; Attendance: 2,700

18 April 1946 10	Colchester United	3–3	Bedford Town	Colchester
18:15	Bower; Hodgson; Jones	Report	Unknown goalscorer	Stadium: Layer Road; Attendance: 3,521

== Squad statistics ==
=== Appearances and goals ===
No.	Pos	Nat	Player	Total		Southern League		Southern League Cup		FA Cup	
No.	Pos	Nat	Player	Apps	Goals	Apps	Goals	Apps	Goals	Apps	Goals
	DF	(Wales) WAL	Bill Bower	30	1	20	0	10	1	0	0
	DF	(England) ENG	Syd Fieldus	1	0	1	0	0	0	0	0
	DF		Jimmy Jenkins	27	0	19	0	7	0	1	0
	DF	(Northern Ireland) NIR	Paddy Shiels	15	1	6	0	8	1	1	0
	FW	(England) ENG	Bob Collins	8	2	2	1	6	1	0	0
	FW	(England) ENG	Bob Gregg	3	1	2	1	0	0	1	0
	FW		Chris Harman	15	4	11	4	3	0	1	0
	FW		Bob Hodgson	9	5	3	2	6	3	0	0
	FW		Bobby Hoines	4	0	4	0	0	0	0	0
	FW	(England) ENG	Bob Hutchings	12	0	4	0	8	0	0	0
	FW	(England) ENG	Frank Rawcliffe	11	3	2	0	9	3	0	0
	FW	(Scotland) SCO	Tom Tobin	1	0	0	0	1	0	0	0
Players who appeared for Colchester who left during the season
	GK	(England) ENG	Harry Brown	12	0	10	0	2	0	0	0
	GK		Robert Brown	7	0	2	0	5	0	0	0
	GK		Peter Dawson	1	0	1	0	0	0	0	0
	GK	(England) ENG	Ray Dring	3	0	2	0	0	0	1	0
	GK	(England) ENG	Alf Jefferies	1	0	0	0	1	0	0	0
	GK		Alex Kingston	4	0	2	0	2	0	0	0
	GK	(England) ENG	Billy Light	2	0	2	0	0	0	0	0
	GK		Bill Wilkie	1	0	1	0	0	0	0	0
	DF	(Northern Ireland) NIR	Cecil Allan	1	0	1	0	0	0	0	0
	DF	(England) ENG	Doug Beach	4	2	3	2	1	0	0	0
	DF		George Coulson	1	0	0	0	1	0	0	0
	DF	(England) ENG	Joe James	9	0	8	0	1	0	0	0
	DF	(Wales) WAL	Charlie Jones	2	0	1	0	1	0	0	0
	DF	(England) ENG	Sid Jones	15	2	8	1	7	1	0	0
	DF		W Milne	4	0	3	0	0	0	1	0
	DF	(Scotland) SCO	Roddy Munro	1	0	0	0	1	0	0	0
	DF		O'Sullivan	1	0	1	0	0	0	0	0
	DF		Robson	4	0	3	0	0	0	1	0
	DF	(England) ENG	Jack Southam	13	1	11	1	2	0	0	0
	DF		Ron West	1	0	1	0	0	0	0	0
	MF	(England) ENG	Harry Bamford	1	1	0	0	1	1	0	0
	MF		Bramhall	1	0	1	0	0	0	0	0
	MF	(England) ENG	Bobby Browne	2	0	2	0	0	0	0	0
	MF	(England) ENG	Geoff Fox	1	0	0	0	1	0	0	0
	MF	(England) ENG	Gray	1	0	1	0	0	0	0	0
	MF		Percy Heal	6	0	5	0	0	0	1	0
	MF		Holmes	1	0	1	0	0	0	0	0
	MF	(Scotland) SCO	David Nelson	3	0	1	0	2	0	0	0
	FW		Andrews	1	0	1	0	0	0	0	0
	FW	(England) ENG	George Barnard	4	1	3	1	1	0	0	0
	FW		Beveridge	1	0	1	0	0	0	0	0
	FW		Bickmore	1	0	1	0	0	0	0	0
	FW	(England) ENG	Sid Bidewell	7	4	1	0	6	4	0	0
	FW		Buckley	1	0	1	0	0	0	0	0
	FW	(Scotland) SCO	Jock Cameron	1	0	1	0	0	0	0	0
	FW	(England) ENG	Ron Canham	1	0	1	0	0	0	0	0
	FW	(England) ENG	Albert Day	2	0	1	0	1	0	0	0
	FW	(England) ENG	Frank Dudley	1	2	1	2	0	0	0	0
	FW	(England) ENG	Len Duquemin	1	0	0	0	1	0	0	0
	FW	(Scotland) SCO	Jock Ferguson	6	0	5	0	1	0	0	0
	FW		H Fletcher	2	0	1	0	1	0	0	0
	FW		Godfrey	3	0	3	0	0	0	0	0
	FW	(England) ENG	Jim Gotts	1	0	0	0	1	0	0	0
	FW	(England) ENG	Cecil Green	2	0	1	0	1	0	0	0
	FW	(England) ENG	Derek Hawksworth	4	1	4	1	0	0	0	0
	FW		Hogg	1	0	1	0	0	0	0	0
	FW	(England) ENG	Ronnie Hornby	8	3	7	3	0	0	1	0
	FW	(England) ENG	Cliff Hubbard	1	0	1	0	0	0	0	0
	FW	(England) ENG	Fred Inskip	1	0	1	0	0	0	0	0
	FW	(Wales) WAL	Leslie Jones	1	0	1	0	0	0	0	0
	FW		Paddy Kernohan	2	0	2	0	0	0	0	0
	FW	(England) ENG	Billy Leighton	4	0	3	0	1	0	0	0
	FW	(England) ENG	Ernest Muttitt	1	0	0	0	1	0	0	0
	FW		Reeves	5	1	5	1	0	0	0	0
	FW		Righton	2	1	2	1	0	0	0	0
	FW	(England) ENG	Jackie Robinson	2	3	2	3	0	0	0	0
	FW	(England) ENG	Douglas Smale	8	2	2	1	6	1	0	0
	FW	(England) ENG	Alf Smirk	2	1	2	1	0	0	0	0
	FW		Stanyon	1	0	1	0	0	0	0	0
	FW	(England) ENG	Ernest Steele	1	0	1	0	0	0	0	0
	FW		John Sutton	1	3	0	0	1	3	0	0
	FW	(England) ENG	Ivan Thacker	3	0	3	0	0	0	0	0
	FW		A Thompson	1	0	1	0	0	0	0	0
	FW	(England) ENG	Stan Titcombe	6	1	5	1	0	0	1	0
	FW	(England) ENG	Len Townsend	1	3	0	0	1	3	0	0
	FW	(England) ENG	Johnny Westwood	1	1	1	1	0	0	0	0
	FW	(Wales) WAL	Rod Williams	2	0	2	0	0	0	0	0
	FW		Wilmott	8	1	6	1	1	0	1	0

=== Goalscorers ===
Place	Nationality	Position	Name	Southern League	Southern League Cup	FA Cup	Total
1		CF	Bob Hodgson	2	3	0	5
2	(England)	IF	Sid Bidewell	0	4	0	4
2		CF	Chris Harman	4	0	0	4
4	(England)	WG	Ronnie Hornby	3	0	0	3
4	(England)	CF	Frank Rawcliffe	0	3	0	3
4	(England)	IF	Jackie Robinson	3	0	0	3
4		CF	John Sutton	0	3	0	3
4	(England)	IR	Len Townsend	0	3	0	3
9	(England)	FB	Doug Beach	2	0	0	2
9	(England)	OL	Bob Collins	1	1	0	2
9	(England)	CF	Frank Dudley	2	0	0	2
9	(England)	FB	Sid Jones	1	1	0	2
9	(England)	WG	Douglas Smale	1	1	0	2
14	(England)	LH	Harry Bamford	0	1	0	1
14	(England)	CF	George Barnard	1	0	0	1
14	(Wales)	FB	Bill Bower	0	1	0	1
14	(England)	CF	Bob Gregg	1	0	0	1
14	(England)	WG	Derek Hawksworth	1	0	0	1
14		WG	Reeves	1	0	0	1
14		WG	Righton	1	0	0	1
14	(Ireland)	FB	Paddy Shiels	0	1	0	1
14	(England)	IF	Alf Smirk	1	0	0	1
14	(England)	FB	Jack Southam	1	0	0	1
14	(England)	WG	Stan Titcombe	1	0	0	1
14	(England)	OL	Johnny Westwood	1	0	0	1
14		IR	Wilmott	1	0	0	1
			Own goals	0	0	0	0
			TOTALS	0	0	0	0

=== Captains ===
Number of games played as team captain.

Place	Nationality	Position	Player	Southern League	Southern League Cup	FA Cup	Total
1		CH	Jimmy Jenkins	19	5	1	25
2	(Wales)	FB	Bill Bower	0	2	0	2
			Not recorded	1	3	0	4
			TOTALS	20	10	1	31

=== Clean sheets ===
Number of games goalkeepers kept a clean sheet.

Place	Nationality	Player	Southern League	Southern League Cup	FA Cup	Total
1	(England)	Harry Brown	3	0	0	3
1		Robert Brown	1	2	0	3
3		Alex Kingston	1	0	0	1
		TOTALS	5	2	0	7

=== Player debuts ===
Players making their first-team Colchester United debut in a fully competitive match.

Position	Nationality	Player	Date	Opponent	Ground	Notes
FB	(England)	Doug Beach	25 August 1945	Chelmsford City	New Writtle Street	
FB	(Wales)	Bill Bower	25 August 1945	Chelmsford City	New Writtle Street	
CH		Jimmy Jenkins	25 August 1945	Chelmsford City	New Writtle Street	
FB		W Milne	25 August 1945	Chelmsford City	New Writtle Street	
CH		Robson	25 August 1945	Chelmsford City	New Writtle Street	
IR/CF		Godfrey	25 August 1945	Chelmsford City	New Writtle Street	
CF		Chris Harman	25 August 1945	Chelmsford City	New Writtle Street	
WG	(England)	Ronnie Hornby	25 August 1945	Chelmsford City	New Writtle Street	
WG		Reeves	25 August 1945	Chelmsford City	New Writtle Street	
WG	(England)	Stan Titcombe	25 August 1945	Chelmsford City	New Writtle Street	
GK	(England)	Ray Dring	15 September 1945	Bedford Town	Ford End Road	
WG	(England)	Albert Day	15 September 1945	Bedford Town	Ford End Road	
LH		Bramhall	22 September 1945	Yeovil & Petters United	Huish Athletic Ground	
RH	(England)	Gray	22 September 1945	Yeovil & Petters United	Huish Athletic Ground	
RH		Holmes	22 September 1945	Yeovil & Petters United	Huish Athletic Ground	
FB	(England)	Jack Southam	22 September 1945	Yeovil & Petters United	Huish Athletic Ground	
CF		Paddy Kernohan	22 September 1945	Yeovil & Petters United	Huish Athletic Ground	
WG		Stanyon	22 September 1945	Yeovil & Petters United	Huish Athletic Ground	
GK		Peter Dawson	29 September 1945	Bedford Town	Layer Road	
LB	(Ireland)	Cecil Allan	29 September 1945	Bedford Town	Layer Road	(Note: Second debut for the club)
IR		Buckley	29 September 1945	Bedford Town	Layer Road	
IL	(Scotland)	Jock Cameron	29 September 1945	Bedford Town	Layer Road	
WG	(England)	Fred Inskip	29 September 1945	Bedford Town	Layer Road	
IR		A Thompson	29 September 1945	Bedford Town	Layer Road	
GK	(England)	Harry Brown	6 October 1945	Cheltenham Town	Layer Road	
LH		Percy Heal	6 October 1945	Cheltenham Town	Layer Road	
CH		O'Sullivan	6 October 1945	Cheltenham Town	Layer Road	
CF		Andrews	6 October 1945	Cheltenham Town	Layer Road	
CF	(Wales)	Rod Williams	6 October 1945	Cheltenham Town	Layer Road	
IR		Wilmott	6 October 1945	Cheltenham Town	Layer Road	
WH	(Scotland)	David Nelson	13 October 1945	Cardiff City Reserves	Layer Road	
WH	(England)	Bobby Browne	13 October 1945	Cardiff City Reserves	Layer Road	
FB	(Ireland)	Paddy Shiels	3 November 1945	Wisbech Town	Fenland Stadium	
CF	(England)	Bob Gregg	3 November 1945	Wisbech Town	Fenland Stadium	
IF	(England)	Alf Smirk	10 November 1945	Bath City	Layer Road	
GK		Bill Wilkie	17 November 1945	Hereford United	Edgar Street	
CB	(England)	Joe James	17 November 1945	Hereford United	Edgar Street	
CF	(England)	George Barnard	17 November 1945	Hereford United	Edgar Street	
IL	(Scotland)	Jock Ferguson	24 November 1945	Worcester City	Layer Road	
IF	(England)	Jackie Robinson	24 November 1945	Worcester City	Layer Road	
FB	(England)	Sid Jones	8 December 1945	Barry Town	Jenner Park Stadium	
CH		Ron West	8 December 1945	Barry Town	Jenner Park Stadium	
OL		Bickmore	8 December 1945	Barry Town	Jenner Park Stadium	
WG	(England)	Derek Hawksworth	8 December 1945	Barry Town	Jenner Park Stadium	
IF	(Wales)	Leslie Jones	15 December 1945	Yeovil & Petters United	Layer Road	
FB	(Wales)	Charlie Jones	29 December 1945	Cheltenham Town	Whaddon Road	
CF	(England)	Ron Canham	29 December 1945	Cheltenham Town	Whaddon Road	
IR	(England)	Cecil Green	29 December 1945	Cheltenham Town	Whaddon Road	
IF	(England)	Billy Leighton	29 December 1945	Cheltenham Town	Whaddon Road	
IR		Bobby Hoines	12 January 1946	Hereford United	Layer Road	
GK	(England)	Alf Jefferies	19 January 1946	Guildford City	Layer Road	
IR	(England)	Len Townsend	19 January 1946	Guildford City	Layer Road	
OR		Beveridge	26 January 1946	Worcester City	St George's Lane	
LW		Hogg	26 January 1946	Worcester City	St George's Lane	
WG	(England)	Cliff Hubbard	2 February 1946	Bath City	Twerton Park	
WG	(England)	Ernest Steele	2 February 1946	Bath City	Twerton Park	
GK		Alex Kingston	9 February 1946	Barry Town	Layer Road	
OL	(England)	Bob Collins	9 February 1946	Barry Town	Layer Road	
CF	(England)	Frank Dudley	9 February 1946	Barry Town	Layer Road	
LW	(England)	Bob Hutchings	9 February 1946	Barry Town	Layer Road	
WG		Righton	9 February 1946	Barry Town	Layer Road	
CF		Bob Hodgson	16 February 1946	Swindon Town Reserves	County Ground	
GK		Robert Brown	23 February 1946	Swindon Town Reserves	Layer Road	
CF		H Fletcher	23 February 1946	Swindon Town Reserves	Layer Road	
CF	(England)	Frank Rawcliffe	23 February 1946	Swindon Town Reserves	Layer Road	
WG	(England)	Douglas Smale	23 February 1946	Swindon Town Reserves	Layer Road	
OL	(England)	Johnny Westwood	23 February 1946	Swindon Town Reserves	Layer Road	
IF	(England)	Sid Bidewell	16 March 1946	Cardiff City Reserves	Ninian Park	
RH	(England)	Geoff Fox	3 April 1946	Chelmsford City	New Writtle Street	
CF	(England)	Len Duquemin	3 April 1946	Chelmsford City	New Writtle Street	
LH	(England)	Harry Bamford	13 April 1946	Guildford City	St Joseph's Road	
CH		George Coulson	13 April 1946	Guildford City	St Joseph's Road	
FB	(Scotland)	Roddy Munro	13 April 1946	Guildford City	St Joseph's Road	
WG	(England)	Jim Gotts	13 April 1946	Guildford City	St Joseph's Road	
IF	(England)	Ernest Muttitt	13 April 1946	Guildford City	St Joseph's Road	
CF		John Sutton	13 April 1946	Guildford City	St Joseph's Road	
IR	(Scotland)	Tom Tobin	18 April 1946	Bedford Town	Layer Road	

== See also ==
- List of Colchester United F.C. seasons
