= List of Norwich City F.C. players (25–99 appearances) =

Below is a list of footballers who have played for Norwich City in 25-99 competitive first-team matches.

== Key ==
The list is ordered first by date of debut, and then alphabetically by surname. Appearances as a substitute are included. Players are listed according to the date they signed for the club – those with their names in bold have been inducted into the Norwich City F.C. Hall of Fame. Statistics are correct as of the match played on 16 December 2013. Where a player left the club permanently after this date, his statistics are updated to his date of leaving.

Positions key
Pre-1960s		1960s–	
GK	Goalkeeper		
RB	Right-back		
LB	Left-back		
HB	Half-back	MF	Midfielder
WH	Wing-half	MF	Midfielder
OR	Outside-right	RW	Right-wing
OL	Outside-left	LW	Left-wing
IR	Inside-right	RM	Right midfield
IL	Inside-left	LM	Left midfield
CF	Centre-forward	FW	Forward
U	Utility player		

Position

Playing positions are listed according to the tactical formations that were employed at the time. Thus the change in the names of defensive and midfield positions reflects the tactical evolution that occurred from the 1960s onwards.

Club career

This is defined as the first and last calendar years in which the player appeared for the club in any of the competitions listed below.

Appearances and goals

League appearances and goals comprise those in the Southern League, the Football League and the Premier League. Appearances in the 1939–40 Football League season, abandoned after three games because of the Second World War, are excluded. Total appearances and goals comprise those in the Football Alliance, Football League (including play-offs), Premier League, FA Cup, Football League Cup, UEFA Cup, Associate Members' Cup/Football League Trophy, and defunct competitions the Anglo-Italian Cup, Anglo-Scottish Cup, Watney Cup, Texaco Cup, Full Members' Cup and ScreenSport Super Cup. Matches in wartime competitions are excluded.

International selection

Players who have been selected for full international football (not including amateur, Under-23 or other youth levels) have a link to their national side's Wikipedia page, denoted with a green box and asterisk*. Only the highest level of international competition is given, except where a player competed for more than one country, in which case the highest level reached for each is shown.

Name	Nationality	Pos	NCFC career	Lge apps	Lge goals	Total apps	Total goals	Notes
Zema Abbey	England	FW	2000–2004	59	7	63	8	
Alf Ackerman	South Africa	FW	1951–1954	66	31	70	35	
Chris Adams	England	OL	1952–1955	29	3	30	3	
George Addy	England	LH	1920–1922	31	6	33	6	
John Aitken	Scotland	OL	1926–1927	42	8	46	8	
Ade Akinbiyi	Nigeria*	FW	1993–1997	49	3	58	5	
Malcolm Allen	Wales*	FW	1988–1990	35	8	46	15	
George Anderson	Scotland	IL	1929–1930	28	12	30	12	
Cédric Anselin	France	MF	1998–2001	26	1	29	1	
Ivan Armes	England	WH	1946–1950	61	1	65	1	
**Dean Ashton**	England*	FW	2005–2006	44	17	46	18	Norwich's record transfer fee received at the time
Jens Berthel Askou	Denmark	DF	2009–2011	27	2	33	3	
Ronnie Bacon	England	OR	1955–1958	42	6	42	6	
Ashley Barnes	England	FW	2023–2025	43	6	49	7	
Ron Barnes	England	OR	1963–1964	21	1	25	1	
Leon Barnett	England	DF	2010–2013	50	2	55	2	
Darren Beckford	England	FW	1991–1993	38	8	49	13	Norwich's record signing at the time
Jackie Bell	England	LH	1962–1964	48	3	58	5	
Sam Bell	England	IR	1930–1934	76	26	79	27	
**Craig Bellamy**	Wales*	FW	1996–2001	84	32	91	34	Norwich's record transfer fee received at the time
Albert Bennett	England	FW	1968–1971	55	15	60	16	
Dave Bennett	England	MF	1978–1984	71	9	75	11	
Elliott Bennett	England	RW	2011–2015	67	2	79	3	
Anis Ben Slimane	Tunisia	MF	2024–present	33	2	33	2	
John Benson	Scotland	RB	1973–1975	30	1	37	1	
David Bentley	England*	MF	2004–2005	26	2	28	2	On loan from Arsenal
William Bertram	England	IR	1921–1922	25	2	30	3	
Ryan Bertrand	England*	LB	2007–2009	56	0	60	0	On loan from Chelsea (two spells)
Wayne Biggins	England	FW	1985–1988	79	16	97	21	
Paul Blades	England	DF	1990–1992	47	0	62	0	Norwich's record signing at the time
Cecil Blakemore	England	IL	1931–1933	70	29	70	29	
Jean-Yves de Blasiis	France	MF	1999–2001	35	0	38	0	
**Terry Bly**	England	CF	1956–1960	57	31	67	38	
**Jimmy Bone**	Scotland*	FW	1971–1973	39	9	47	13	Scored Norwich's first ever First Division goal
Curtis Booth	England	IF	1920–1923	62	11	65	13	
Carl Bradshaw	England	RB	1994–1998	65	2	74	3	
Robbie Brady	Republic of Ireland*	MF	2015–2017	59	7	62	7	
Jim Brennan	Canada*	LB	2003–2006	43	1	48	2	
Kenny Brown	England	RB	1986–1988	25	0	28	0	
Laurie Brown	England	DF	1966–1968	81	2	91	2	
Oliver Brown	England	CF	1931–1933	51	33	51	33	
Bill Brown	Scotland	RH	1929–1931	50	2	53	2	
Mark Bunn	England	GK	2012–2015	23	0	31	0	
Ben Burley	England	OL	1935–1938	35	4	37	4	
**Ollie Burton**	Wales*	WH	1960–1963	57	8	73	9	
Viv Busby	England	FW	1976-1977	22	11	26	11	
Sam Byram	England	DF	2019-2023	47	1	54	1	
Archie Campbell	Scotland	FB	1924–1928	87	0	97	0	
Shaun Carey	Republic of Ireland	MF	1995–2000	68	0	77	0	
Simon Charlton	England	DF	2004–2006	45	2	50	2	
Ben Chrisene	England	DF	2024–present	26	1	28	1	
Sammy Chung	England	WH	1954–1957	47	9	48	9	
Sammy Clingan	Northern Ireland*	MF	2008–2009	40	6	43	6	
Ernest Coleman	England	IR	1937–1939	63	25	64	26	
Jürgen Colin	Netherlands	RB	2004–2006	58	0	64	0	
Tony Collins	England	IF	1953–1955	29	2	31	2	
Bryan Conlon	England	FW	1968–1970	29	8	31	8	
Jim Conway	Scotland	FW	1961–1964	42	13	50	15	
Adrian Coote	Northern Ireland	FW	1997–2001	54	3	61	3	
José Córdoba	Panama	CD	2024–present	34	1	36	1	
Tom Coulthard	England	FB	1924–1926	40	1	42	1	
William Cousins	England	OR	1927–1928	26	0	26	0	
Charlie Crickmore	England	LW	1967–1970	56	9	64	10	
Ante Crnac	Croatia	FW	2024–present	38	7	40	7	
Andrew Crofts	Wales*	MF	2010–2012	68	8	70	8	
Reg Cropper	England	IR	1926–1928	49	16	53	18	His brother Arthur also played for Norwich
Paul Dalglish	Scotland	FW	1998–2001	43	2	48	2	
Ian Davies	England	LB	1973–1979	32	2	34	2	
Derek Davis	Wales	GK	1946–1948	26	0	28	0	
Fernando Derveld	Netherlands	LB	2000–2001	22	1	25	1	
John Devine	Republic of Ireland*	DF	1983–1985	53	3	69	3	
George Dobson	England	OL	1920–1921	27	1	28	1	
Tom Docherty	England	OL	1950–1953	85	4	92	7	
Louie Donowa	England	RW	1982–1986	62	11	80	15	FA Youth Cup winner (1983)
Graham Dorrans	Scotland*	MF	2015–2017	61	9	77	9	
Kieran Dowell	England	MF	2020–2023	67	11	76	12	
Callum Doyle	England	CB	2024–2025	40	1	43	1	On loan from Manchester City
Allenby Driver	England	IF	1947–1950	49	19	49	19	
Dion Dublin	England*	FW	2006–2008	70	12	78	16	Norwich City Player of the Season 2007–2008
John Duffy	Scotland	RB	1949–1954	78	0	87	0	
Shane Duffy	Republic of Ireland*	CB	2023–present	81	5	87	5	
John Duthie	Scotland	IL	1925–1927	27	4	27	4	
Sidney Earl	England	WH	1924–1926	29	1	30	1	
Robert Earnshaw	Wales*	FW	2006–2007	45	27	47	27	Norwich's record transfer fee received at the time
Clint Easton	England	MF	2001–2004	50	5	57	5	
Marc Edworthy	England	RB	2003–2005	71	0	76	0	
**Efan Ekoku**	Nigeria*	FW	1993–1994	37	15	45	17	Africa Cup of Nations winner (1994)
Shaun Elliott	England	DF	1986–1988	31	2	39	2	
Johan Elmander	Sweden*	FW	2013–2014	28	1	33	3	On loan from Galatasaray
Dickson Etuhu	Nigeria*	MF	2005–2007	62	7	70	8	
Ched Evans	Wales*	FW	2007–2008	28	10	28	10	On loan from Manchester City
Christian Fassnacht	Switzerland*	RW	2023–2025	43	6	48	6	
Len Featherby	England	OR	1924–1926	26	3	26	3	
Leroy Fer	Netherlands*	MF	2013–2014	30	3	33	4	First Norwich player to score at a World Cup
Richard Field	England	HB	1923–1924	28	0	29	0	
Kellen Fisher	England	FB	2023–present	46	0	54	0	
Len Flack	England	WH	1934–1947	49	0	54	0	
Fraser Forster	England*	GK	2009–2010	38	0	43	0	On loan from Newcastle United
Mark Fotheringham	Scotland	MF	2007–2009	69	3	76	4	
David Fox	England	MF	2010–2013	62	1	76	1	
Damien Francis	Jamaica*	MF	2003–2005	73	14	78	14	
John Friar	Scotland	OR	1935–1939	82	18	86	18	
Erik Fuglestad	Norway	FB	1997–2000	74	2	80	2	
**Billy Furness**	England*	IF	1937–1947	93	21	96	21	
Paul Gallacher	Scotland*	GK	2005–2007	31	0	36	0	
Javi Garrido	Spain	LB	2012–2015	48	0	54	0	
Roger Gibbins	England	FW	1976–1978	48	12	52	13	
Liam Gibbs	England	MF	2022–present	56	1	64	1	
Ben Gibson	England	CB	2020–2024	85	0	94	1	
Billy Gilmour	Scotland*	MF	2021–2022	24	0	28	0	On loan from Chelsea
Steve Goble	England	LW	1979–1981 1984–1985	31	2	35	2	
Ben Godfrey	England*	DF	2016–2020	67	4	78	5	
Herbert Goffey	England	IR	1935–1937	32	9	35	9	
Steve Govier	England	DF	1971–1974	22	1	30	2	
Lewis Grabban	England	FW	2014–2016	41	13	44	13	
Bob Graham	Scotland	LB	1929–1931	50	0	52	0	
Peter Grant	Scotland*	MF	1997–1999	68	3	75	3	Manager of Norwich City (2006–2007)
Steve Grapes	England	MF	1970–1977	41	3	52	4	
George Gray	England	RB	1920–1921	50	0	51	0	
Wilf Greenwell	England	CH	1928–1931	47	2	52	3	
Fred Hall	England	GK	1935–1947	90	0	94	0	
Roger Hansbury	England	GK	1974–1981	78	0	84	0	
Ron Hansell	England	IF	1953–1956	29	7	36	10	
Åge Hareide	Norway*	DF	1982–1984	40	2	55	3	
**Asa Hartford**	Scotland*	MF	1984–1985	28	2	40	5	
Don Heath	England	OR	1964–1968	82	15	91	18	
Ian Henderson	England	FW	2002–2007	68	7	79	7	
Ken Hill	England	WH	1963–1966	44	0	50	0	
Phil Hoadley	England	DF	1978–1982	77	0	89	1	
James Hodge	Scotland	FB	1922–1923	51	1	55	1	
Oscar Hold	England	IF	1946–1949	44	18	47	20	
Bert Holmes	England	CH	1948–1955	58	1	59	1	
Gary Hooper	England	FW	2013–2015	64	18	70	20	
Harry Hopewell	England	HB	1920–1922	27	0	27	0	
Harold Houghton	England	IL	1934–1935	52	10	56	10	
Gerry Howshall	England	MF	1967–1971	40	0	43	0	
Andy Hughes	England	MF	2005–2007	72	2	79	2	
Stephen Hughes	Scotland	MF	2009–2011	30	3	36	3	
Jordan Hugill	England	FW	2020–2023	38	4	44	6	
Tommy Hunt	England	CF	1929–1932	50	33	51	33	
Ross Jack	Scotland	FW	1980–1983	56	10	67	14	
Simeon Jackson	Canada*	FW	2010–2013	73	17	83	21	
John Jarvie	Scotland	GK	1929–1930	42	0	44	0	
Ryan Jarvis	England	FW	2003–2008	29	3	38	5	
Joe Jobling	England	HB	1929–1932	72	1	76	1	
Andy Johnson	Wales*	MF	1991–1997	66	13	75	15	
Tommy Johnston	Scotland	CF	1952–1955	60	28	67	33	
Bryn Jones	Wales*	IL	1949–1950	23	1	26	2	The world's most expensive footballer in 1938
Sid Jones	Wales	OL	1946–1948	40	9	48	10	
Mattias Jonson	Sweden*	FW	2004–2005	28	0	30	0	
Freddie Kearns	Republic of Ireland*	CF	1954–1956	28	11	30	14	
Mike Kenning	England	RW	1966–1968	44	9	50	11	
Kyle Lafferty	Northern Ireland*	FW	2014–2017	31	2	39	4	
Joseph Lamb	England	HB	1927–1930	80	2	86	2	
Bunny Larkin	England	IF	1959–1962	41	12	48	16	
Pierre Lees-Melou	France	MF	2021–2022	33	1	37	1	
Moritz Leitner	Germany	MF	2017–2020	50	2	53	2	
Marc Libbra	France	FW	2001–2002	34	7	38	7	
Roy Lockwood	England	LB	1955–1958	36	0	37	0	
William Lumley	England	CF	1921–1922	24	6	29	6	
Derrick Lythgoe	England	IF	1957–1962	62	22	74	29	His son, Philip, also played for Norwich City
James Mackrell	Scotland	LB	1937–1939	38	0	39	0	
Owen Madden	Republic of Ireland*	OL	1936–1938	22	1	25	1	
James Maddison	England*	MF	2016–2018	47	15	53	16	
Ken Mallender	England	DF	1968–1971	46	1	48	1	
John Manning	England	FW	1967–1969	60	21	67	22	
Fred Mansfield	England	RB	1947–1948	34	0	37	0	
Emiliano Marcondes	Denmark	MF	2024–present	33	5	33	5	
Dieumerci Mbokani	DR Congo*	FW	2015–2016	29	7	30	7	On loan from Dynamo Kyiv
Frank McCudden	England	IR	1924–1926	38	14	41	14	
Sam McCallum	England	LB	2020–2024	50	1	60	1	
Cody McDonald	England	FW	2009–2011	24	4	32	5	
John McDowell	England	RB	1979–1981	41	1	45	1	
Brian McGovern	Republic of Ireland	DF	2000–2002	21	1	25	1	
Michael McGovern	Northern Ireland*	GK	2016–2023	32	0	42	0	
Frank McKenna	England	IL	1928–1929	41	18	44	18	
Leon McKenzie	England	FW	2003–2006	79	20	81	22	
Daniel McKinney	Republic of Ireland*	OR	1924–1926	48	4	52	4	
Bernard McLaverty	England	CH	1928–1929	55	4	56	4	
Anthony McNamee	England	RW	2009–2011	34	1	37	1	
Matt McNeil	England	CH	1955–1957	44	2	44	2	
**Gary Megson**	England	CM	1992–1995	46	1	54	1	Manager of Norwich City (1996)
Ian Mellor	England	LW	1972–1974	29	2	43	9	
Ally Miller	Scotland	OL	1962–1964	23	2	25	2	
Johnny Miller	England	RW	1974–1976	23	2	29	5	Norwich City's first black player
Danny Mills	England*	RB	1995–1998	66	0	73	1	
Jimmy Moran	Scotland	IR	1957–1960	36	17	40	18	
George Morgan	Wales	OL	1946–1950	65	15	67	15	
Steve Morison	Wales*	FW	2011–2013	53	10	59	12	
Peter Morris	England	MF	1974–1976	66	1	86	1	
Robert Morris	England	HB	1933–1938	41	0	46	0	
Alf Moule	England	IL	1927–1928	32	11	35	12	Also played cricket for Essex and Devon
Jacob Murphy	England	RW	2013–2017	37	9	42	10	FA Youth Cup winner (2013)
John Murphy	Scotland	CH	1924–1926	35	0	36	0	
Steven Naismith	Scotland*	FW	2016–2018	44	6	48	8	
Kyle Naughton	England	RB	2011–2012	32	0	32	0	On loan from Tottenham Hotspur
Steen Nedergaard	Denmark	RB	2000–2003	90	5	97	5	
Michael Nelson	England	DF	2009–2011	39	5	45	5	
**Jon Newsome**	England	DF	1994–1996	62	7	76	8	Norwich City Player of the Season 1994–1995
David Nielsen	Denmark	FW	2001–2003	58	14	65	15	
Mark Nightingale	England	U	1977–1982	35	0	39	0	
**Maurice Norman**	England*	CH	1955	35	0	35	0	
Mathias Normann	Norway*	MF	2021-2022	23	1	25	1	On loan from FC Rostov
Joe North	England	IL	1924–1926	56	19	60	20	
Alex Notman	Scotland	FW	2000–2003	54	1	61	1	
Neil O'Donnell	Scotland	MF	1967–1974	50	2	64	3	
Bill O'Hagan	Republic of Ireland*	GK	1922–1923	53	0	57	0	
Gary O'Neil	England	MF	2014–2016	58	0	66	0	
Keith O'Neill	Republic of Ireland*	LW	1994–1999	73	9	87	10	
**Martin O'Neill**	Northern Ireland*	MF	1981 1982–1983	66	12	75	13	Manager of Norwich City (1995)
Jack O'Reilly	Republic of Ireland*	CF	1936–1939	33	11	37	12	
Nélson Oliveira	Portugal*	FW	2016–2019	65	19	70	20	
Jim Oliver	Scotland	FW	1962–1965	40	14	47	17	
Andrew Omobamidele	Republic of Ireland*	CB	2021–2023	50	2	57	2	
Matty Pattison	South Africa*	MF	2008–2009	51	3	55	3	
Anthony Pilkington	Republic of Ireland*	LW	2011–2014	65	14	71	15	
Przemysław Płacheta	Poland*	LW	2020–2024	54	1	61	2	
Sid Plunkett	England	OR	1938–1947	28	7	36	7	
Ivo Pinto	Portugal	RB	2016–2019	86	3	95	3	
Lee Power	Republic of Ireland	FW	1990–1994	44	10	48	10	
Spencer Prior	England	DF	1993–1996	74	1	89	2	Norwich City Player of the Season 1995–1996
Alex Pritchard	England	MF	2016–2018	38	8	43	8	
Colin Prophett	England	DF	1973–1974	35	0	48	0	
Milot Rashica	Kosovo*	LW	2021–2023	35	1	40	2	
Peter Rattray	Scotland	IL	1952–1953	24	5	27	5	
Martin Reagan	England	OL	1954–1956	34	4	36	4	
Harrison Reed	England	MF	2017–2018	39	1	43	1	On loan from Southampton
Len Reilly	England	CH	1937–1946	30	0	30	0	
Jordan Rhodes	Scotland*	FW	2018–2019	36	6	40	9	On loan from Sheffield Wednesday
Mark Rivers	England	FW	2001–2004	74	10	82	11	
Mark Robins	England	FW	1992–1994	67	20	78	21	
Carl Robinson	Wales*	MF	2005–2007	49	2	54	2	
Les Robinson	England	IR	1927–1928	31	10	34	12	
Keith Robson	England	FW	1977–1981	65	13	71	4	
Jonathan Rowe	England	MF	2021–2024	48	12	58	13	
Joe Royle	England*	FW	1980–1981	42	9	47	10	
Declan Rudd	England	GK	2008–2017	21	0	34	0	
Lukas Rupp	Germany	MF	2020–2022	54	0	62	2	
Jack Russell	England	OL	1934–1936	12	2	61	23	
Terry Ryder	England	OR	1946–1950	46	12	51	12	His father Terry Sr also played for Norwich
Borja Sainz	Spain	MF	2023–2025	74	24	82	27	
Gabriel Sara	Brazil	MF	2022–2024	85	20	93	21	
Youssef Safri	Morocco*	MF	2004–2007	83	3	92	4	
Ray Savino	England	OR	1957–1962	22	3	27	4	
Oscar Schwartau	Denmark	MF	2024–present	40	1	42	1	
Dick Scott	England	WH	1961–1963	28	1	36	3	
Jack Scott	England	CH	1932–1937	33	0	45	1	
Keith Scott	England	FW	1995–1997	24	5	29	5	
Kevin Scott	England	DF	1997–1998	33	0	36	0	
Sidney Scott	England	CH	1921–1922	21	0	26	1	
Tom Scott	England	IR	1932–1934	53	26	55	26	
Víctor Segura	Spain	DF	1997–1999	29	0	33	0	
Laurie Sheffield	Wales	FW	1966–1967	27	16	29	16	
Mike Sheron	England	FW	1994–1996	28	2	36	7	
Tim Sherwood	England*	MF	1989–1991	71	10	88	13	
Herbert Skermer	England	GK	1920–1922	67	0	73	0	
Oliver Skipp	England	DM	2020–2021	45	1	47	1	On loan from Tottenham Hotspur
Bill Slack	England	OL	1930–1931	29	2	31	2	
Tom Smalley	England	LH	1938–1939	42	1	43	1	
Ben Smith	England	LB	1920–1924	73	0	81	0	
James Smith	Scotland	GK	1930–1931	31	0	32	0	
Korey Smith	England	MF	2008–2012	67	4	73	4	
Robert Snodgrass	Scotland*	RW	2012–2014	67	12	74	14	
Tony Spearing	England	LB	1984–1988	69	0	82	0	FA Youth Cup winner (1983)
Michael Spillane	Republic of Ireland	MF	2005–2010	26	1	35	1	
Dennis Srbeny	Germany	FW	2018–2020	37	3	43	5	
Jack Stacey	England	RB	2023–present	86	3	94	3	
Barry Staton	England	LB	1962–1963	23	1	31	1	
Billy Steele	Scotland	MF	1973–1977	68	3	76	3	
Albert Sturgess	England*	FB	1923–1925	47	0	52	0	Norwich's oldest League debutant, aged 40
Johnny Summers	England	IF	1950–1954	71	33	76	36	
Andrew Surman	South Africa	MF	2010–2014	52	7	58	8	
Mike Sutton	England	WH	1962–1967	51	3	54	3	His son, Chris, also played for Norwich
Mathias Svensson	Sweden*	FW	2003–2005	42	11	44	11	
Richard Symonds	England	U	1979–1983	59	0	68	0	
Alan Taylor	England	FW	1979–1980 1988–1989	29	6	34	8	
Jack Taylor	England	FB	1938–1946	50	0	56	0	
James Thompson	England	CF	1929–1930	28	17	30	17	
Peter Thorne	England	FW	2005–2007	36	1	42	2	
Albert Thorpe	England	RB	1932–1935	61	0	62	0	
Marc Tierney	England	LB	2011–2013	34	0	39	0	
**Andy Townsend**	Republic of Ireland*	MF	1988–1990	71	8	88	10	
George Travers	England	CF	1920–1921	29	14	30	14	
Tom Trybull	Germany	MF	2017–2020	67	3	80	5	
Michael Turner	England	DF	2012–2017	71	4	75	4	
Christos Tzolis	Greece*	LW	2021–2024	27	1	30	3	
Ricky van Wolfswinkel	Netherlands*	FW	2013–2016	25	1	28	2	Norwich's record signing at the time
Peter Vasper	England	GK	1968–1970	31	0	32	0	
**Percy Varco**	England	FW	1927–1929	57	37	65	47	
George Waites	England	OF	1961–1962	36	11	40	11	
Nick Walls	England	WH	1925–1927	30	2	31	2	
Mark Walton	Wales	GK	1990–1992	22	0	28	0	
Ashley Ward	England	FW	1994–1996	53	18	60	21	
Elliott Ward	England	DF	2010–2012	51	0	55	1	
Harry Ware	England	CF	1937–1946	43	13	45	14	
Marley Watkins	Wales*	RW	2017–2018	24	0	27	1	
Zak Whitbread	United States	DF	2009–2012	44	1	48	1	
Brian Whitehouse	England	CF	1960–1962	41	14	49	18	
Aaron Wilbraham	England	FW	2011–2012	23	2	28	2	
Yanic Wildschut	Suriname*	LW	2017–2019	25	2	29	2	
Brandon Williams	England	LB	2021–2022	26	0	29	0	On loan from Manchester United
**David Williams**	Wales*	MF	1985–1988	60	11	74	12	
Grenville Williams	Wales	WH	1946–1947	40	0	43	0	
Tom Williams	England	OL	1930–1932	27	13	28	13	
Ernest Williamson	England*	GK	1923–1925	43	0	47	0	
Tom Williamson	Scotland	CH	1931–1933	82	4	85	4	
Bob Wilson	Scotland	WH	1957–1959	62	0	66	0	
Che Wilson	England	DF	1998–2000	22	0	25	0	
Joe Wilson	England	OL	1924–1926	41	4	41	4	
John Wilson	England	RB	1953–1958	47	0	48	0	
Harry Wingham	England	FB	1925–1926	43	1	44	1	
Clive Woods	England	LW	1980–1981	32	4	37	4	
Colin Woodthorpe	England	FB	1990–1994	43	1	53	1	
Stephen Wright	England	LH	1922–1923	36	1	40	1	
