= Essex derby =

Football rivalry in Essex, England

- Location: Essex
- Teams: Colchester United; Southend United
- First meeting: 14 October 1950; Third Division South; Southend 4–2 Colchester
- Latest meeting: 20 April 2021; League Two; Colchester 2–0 Southend
- Stadiums: Colchester Community Stadium (Colchester); Roots Hall (Southend)

Statistics
- Total meetings: 82
- Most wins: Southend United (34)
- Most player appearances: Sandy Anderson, Micky Cook, Peter Wright (18)
- All-time series: Southend: 34; Colchester: 31; Drawn: 17
- Largest victory: Colchester 6–1 Southend (Football League Trophy, 2020) Southend 4-0 Colchester (League, twice)

In English football, the Essex derby is the local derby between two of the three professional teams in the English county of Essex – Colchester United and Southend United. The first Essex derby match that took place was a 4–2 victory for Southend in a Third Division South tie on 14 October 1950. The derby has been contested in four different competitions, with Southend winning 34 of the games, Colchester winning 31 and 17 have been drawn. The other professional team in Essex is Braintree Town.

== History ==
Southend United were one of 24 teams that co-founded The Football League's new Third Division in 1920 for the upcoming 1920–21 season. Colchester United were promoted into The Football League, joining the Third Division South for the 1950–51 season. The first match between Colchester United and Southend United was 14 October 1950, a Third Division South game won by Southend 4–2.

From 1989 to 2004, the two clubs did not meet in any competitive fixtures. The two clubs both reached the Football League Trophy Southern Area Final, where they met for the first time in 15 years on 10 February 2004, at Layer Road for the first leg, with Southend winning 3–2. They met six days later at Roots Hall, for the Southern Area Final second leg, where the teams drew 1–1 and Southend winning 4–3 on aggregate to reach the overall final of the Football League Trophy at the Millennium Stadium, Cardiff.

During an Essex derby match on 25 November 2006, there were three dismissals, two for Southend and one for Colchester. Southend's captain, Kevin Maher was sent-off in the 51st minute for an off-the-ball incident involving Colchester's captain, Karl Duguid. Maher claimed that Duguid had cheated by conning the referee due to his over-reacting, and claimed; "He clipped my leg, so I turned to say 'What are you doing?' and he fell over clutching his face like he'd been poleaxed by Mike Tyson." Duguid stated in his defence; "He chested me and put his face in my face. That's a headbutt, a sending-off offence." Mark Gower picked up a yellow card for dissent after arguing with the referee, Steve Bennett, about the sending off. Five minutes later, Gower was booked again, this time for a late challenge on Duguid. Chris Barker was sent-off in the 78th minute, after he was booked twice. Southend appealed against the red card, which was rejected by The Football Association's disciplinary commission.

Comparative chart of yearly table positions of Colchester and Southend in the football league.

The Essex derby returned for the 2015–16 League One season after Southend were promoted through the League Two play-offs, seeing a return of the fixture for the first time since the 2009–10 season. Southend won the first match between the sides in five years on 26 December 2015 by 2–0 at the Colchester Community Stadium. The match at Roots Hall during the same season was a fiery affair which saw Colchester vice-captain Alex Gilbey sent off for a foul on Southend's Ryan Leonard in the first-half. After former U's player Anthony Wordsworth had put the Shrimpers ahead in the 82nd-minute, Adam Barrett soon doubled the home side's advantage before crowd trouble started. After Barrett had run the length of the pitch to celebrate close to the away fans, a lone Southend supporter jumped onto the pitch and began throwing punches at the Colchester fans. Stewards eventually restrained the man, while other fans had also followed suit in jumping on the pitch, but further violence was avoided after Southend players, police and stewards ushered the fans back into the stands. Police said that the matter would be investigated after video evidence emerged. The game ended 3–0 to Southend. The man involved in the incident admitted affray and pitch invasion at Southend Magistrates Court on 24 February. He was give an eight-week suspended prison sentence and was ordered to pay £265 in fines, while receiving a five-year banning order that prohibited him from attending any football match in the country until 2021.

The largest Essex derby victory was recorded on 10 November 2020, when Colchester beat Southend 6–1 at the Community Stadium. Jevani Brown registered a hat-trick for the U's in the dead rubber EFL Trophy group stage match.

== Statistics and results ==
Colchester United win Draw Southend United win

=== Colchester United in the league at home ===
Date	Venue	Score	Competition	Attendance
3 March 1951	Layer Road	1–3	Third Division (S)	12,360
12 April 1952	Layer Road	1–0	Third Division (S)	11,967
18 October 1952	Layer Road	3–3	Third Division (S)	10,589
29 April 1954	Layer Road	0–1	Third Division (S)	6,035
8 April 1955	Layer Road	2–0	Third Division (S)	10,809
27 August 1955	Layer Road	3–6	Third Division (S)	8,915
18 August 1956	Layer Road	3–2	Third Division (S)	11,454
11 January 1958	Layer Road	1–0	Third Division (S)	9,357
29 September 1958	Layer Road	0–1	Third Division	6,833
15 April 1960	Layer Road	2–3	Third Division	10,317
3 December 1960	Layer Road	2–0	Third Division	5,007
4 May 1963	Layer Road	3–1	Third Division	7,244
14 October 1963	Layer Road	3–3	Third Division	6,610
20 March 1965	Layer Road	3–1	Third Division	2,929
29 November 1968	Layer Road	4–0	Fourth Division	10,604
8 November 1969	Layer Road	0–2	Fourth Division	6,021
13 November 1970	Layer Road	1–1	Fourth Division	7,777
18 October 1971	Layer Road	1–0	Fourth Division	9,807
29 October 1974	Layer Road	1–1	Third Division	6,547
17 April 1976	Layer Road	2–1	Third Division	4,260
19 March 1977	Layer Road	0–1	Fourth Division	6,637
20 October 1978	Layer Road	1–1	Third Division	5,881
22 February 1980	Layer Road	2–1	Third Division	6,135
25 August 1984	Layer Road	3–3	Fourth Division	2,378
4 February 1986	Layer Road	2–0	Fourth Division	1,915
20 March 1987	Layer Road	1–2	Fourth Division	3,357
16 April 1990	Layer Road	0–2	Fourth Division	5,283
4 March 2006	Layer Road	0–3	League One	5,920
25 November 2006	Layer Road	3–0	Championship	5,954
21 February 2009	CCS	0–1	League One	8,651
8 February 2010	CCS	2–0	League One	6,466
26 December 2015	CCS	0–2	League One	9,222
20 April 2021	CCS	2–0	League Two	0

=== Southend United in the league at home ===
Date	Venue	Score	Competition	Attendance
14 October 1950	Southend Stadium	4–2	Third Division (S)	21,000
22 April 1952	Southend Stadium	3–2	Third Division (S)	7,500
7 March 1953	Southend Stadium	4–0	Third Division (S)	10,250
13 March 1954	Southend Stadium	3–0	Third Division (S)	8,100
11 April 1955	Roots Hall	4–2	Third Division (S)	14,000
24 December 1955	Roots Hall	4–0	Third Division (S)	7,500
15 December 1956	Roots Hall	3–2	Third Division (S)	7,500
7 September 1957	Roots Hall	2–3	Third Division (S)	19,000
24 September 1958	Roots Hall	1–1	Third Division	12,000
18 April 1960	Roots Hall	1–0	Third Division	12,533
25 February 1961	Roots Hall	2–1	Third Division	6,047
22 September 1962	Roots Hall	2–3	Third Division	11,487
7 October 1963	Roots Hall	0–0	Third Division	8,875
7 November 1964	Roots Hall	6–3	Third Division	6,941
14 February 1969	Roots Hall	3–1	Fourth Division	12,681
21 February 1970	Roots Hall	2–1	Fourth Division	6,778
12 March 1971	Roots Hall	1–1	Fourth Division	9,406
28 January 1972	Roots Hall	1–4	Fourth Division	8,871
25 April 1975	Roots Hall	1–1	Third Division	5,924
26 December 1975	Roots Hall	2–0	Third Division	6,167
8 October 1976	Roots Hall	0–0	Fourth Division	6,690
2 March 1979	Roots Hall	1–1	Third Division	6,957
12 October 1979	Roots Hall	0–1	Third Division	5,944
29 January 1985	Roots Hall	2–5	Fourth Division	2,401
22 October 1985	Roots Hall	2–4	Fourth Division	8,120
10 October 1986	Roots Hall	1–1	Fourth Division	4,004
26 December 1989	Roots Hall	0–2	Fourth Division	5,563
29 August 2005	Roots Hall	3–1	League One	7,344
6 April 2007	Roots Hall	0–3	Championship	10,552
1 November 2008	Roots Hall	3–3	League One	8,920
26 December 2009	Roots Hall	1–2	League One	10,329
6 February 2016	Roots Hall	3–0	League One	10,279
26 December 2020	Roots Hall	2–0	League Two	0

=== Cup Matches ===
Date	Venue	Home team	Score	Competition	Round	Attendance
17 November 1956	Layer Road	Colchester United	1–4	FA Cup	1st Round	11,280
11 September 1974	Roots Hall	Southend United	0–2	League Cup	2nd Round	7,856
13 August 1982	Layer Road	Colchester United	3–1	League Group Cup	1st Round	1,662
13 March 1984	Layer Road	Colchester United	0–2	Associate Members Cup	2nd Round	2,841
17 November 1984	Roots Hall	Southend United	2–2	FA Cup	1st Round	2,935
21 November 1984	Layer Road	Colchester United	3–2	FA Cup	1st Round replay	3,907
14 January 1986	Layer Road	Colchester United	4–1	Associate Members Cup	1st Round	1,364
20 December 1988	Layer Road	Colchester United	2–1	Associate Members Cup	Qualifying Group	993
22 August 1989	Layer Road	Colchester United	3–4	League Cup	1st Round 1st Leg	3,537
29 August 1989	Roots Hall	Southend United	2–1	League Cup	1st Round 2nd Leg	3,763
10 February 2004	Layer Road	Colchester United	2–3	Football League Trophy	Southern Area Final 1st Leg	5,401
17 February 2004	Roots Hall	Southend United	1–1	Football League Trophy	Southern Area Final 2nd Leg	9,603
29 September 2004	Layer Road	Colchester United	1–1 (Note: Southend won 3–5 on penalties.)	Football League Trophy	1st Round	9,603
7 November 2017	Roots Hall	Southend United	2–0	EFL Trophy	Group stage	2,781
9 October 2018	CCS	Colchester United	2–0	EFL Trophy	Group stage	1,516
10 November 2020	CCS	Colchester United	6–1	EFL Trophy	Group stage	0

=== Results ===
Statistics correct as of 26 December 2020. (Note: 11v11.com excludes the 13 August 1982 Football League Group Cup match.)

	Colchester wins	Draws	Southend wins	Colchester goals	Southend goals
League	23	14	28	100	115
FA Cup	1	1	1	6	8
EFL Cup	1	0	2	6	6
EFL Trophy	4	2	3	18	12
League Group Cup	1	0	0	3	1
Total	30	17	34	133	142

== Shared player history ==
Notable players who have been transferred directly between the clubs are listed below.

=== Colchester to Southend ===
Player	Colchester United career			Southend United career		
Player	Career	Apps	Goals	Career	Apps	Goals
(England) Owen Simpson	1968–1969	45	4	1969–1971	73	1
(England) Roy McDonough	1981–1983; 1990–1994	267	82	1983–1984; 1985–1990	264	44
(England) Tony Hadley	1983–1984	55	0	1974–1983; 1984–1985	337	21
(England) Mario Walsh	1987–1989; 1990–1991	90	35	1989–1990	16	3
(Wales) Morrys Scott	1990	4	0	1990	0	0
(England) Ben Lewis	1995–1997	3	0	1997–1998	19	1
(England) Mark Warren	2002–2003	21	0	2003–2004	39	2
(England) Garry Richards	2004–2007	24	1	2007–2008	14	0
(England) Pat Baldwin	2002–2012	242	2	2012 (Note: Pat Baldwin also appeared on loan from Colchester for Southend, making 18 appearances and scoring 1 goal.)	2	0
(England) John White	2004–2013	255	0	2013– (Note: John White also appeared on loan from Colchester for Southend, making 6 appearances.)	0	0

=== Southend to Colchester ===
Player	Southend United career			Colchester United career		
Player	Career	Apps	Goals	Career	Apps	Goals
(England) Doug Beach	1947–1949	42	0	1945–1946; 1949–1950	39	2
(England) Billy Leighton	1938–1939	18	0	1945–1946	4	0
(England) Len Jones	1949–1950	33	0	1950–1953	74	4
(England) Frank Coombs	1950–1951	20	0	1951–1954	38	0
(England) Peter Bullock	1965	12	2	1965–1968	102	33
(England) Alan Shires	1965–1966	1	0	1966–1968	25	3
(England) Bobby Howlett	1967–1969	6	0	1969–1970	18	0
(Scotland) John Kurila	1968–1970	102	2	1970–1971	65	4
(England) Alex Smith	1970–1974	140	1	1974–1975 (Note: Alex Smith also appeared on loan from Southend for Colchester, making 11 appearances.)	44	1
(England) Tony Hadley	1974–1983; 1984–1985	337	21	1983–1984	55	0
(England) Kirk Game	1984–1985	0	0	1985–1987	38	0
(England) Nicky Smith	1987–1990	72	6	1990–1994	190	15
(England) Mario Walsh	1989–1990	16	3	1987–1989; 1990–1991	90	35
(England) Roy McDonough	1983–1984; 1985–1990	264	44	1981–1983; 1990–1994	267	82
(England) Jason Cook	1989–1991	39	2	1991–1993	84	5
(England) Christian Hyslop	1989–1993	20	0	1993–1994	8	0
(England) Adam Locke	1990–1994	87	4	1994–1997 (Note: Adam Locke also appeared on loan from Southend for Colchester, making 5 appearances.)	103	8
(England) Merrick James-Lewis	2010–2012	1	0	2012	0	0
