= William Steele =

William, Willie, Bill, or Billy Steele may refer to:

== Law and politics ==
- William Steele (Lord Chancellor of Ireland) (1610–1680), Lord Chancellor of Ireland
- William G. Steele (1820–1892), American politician
- William H. Steele (New York politician) (1838 –1911), American lawyer and politician
- William Randolph Steele (1842–1901), American congressional delegate from the Territory of Wyoming
- William H. Steele (Wisconsin politician) (1872–1955), American politician
- William H. Steele (judge) (born 1951), American jurist

== Military ==
- William Steele (Confederate general) (1819–1885), American Army officer and Confederate general
- William Steele (Australian Army officer) (1895–1966), Australian Army general
- William B. Steele (born 1929), United States Army general
- William H. Steele (United States Army officer) (born c. 1955), American military officer
- William M. Steele, General Officer in the U.S. Army

== Sports ==
- Bill Steele (baseball) (1885–1949), American baseball pitcher
- Willie Steele (William Samuel Steele, 1923–1989), American track & field athlete
- Bill Steele (sailor) (born 1940), Hong Kong Olympic sailor
- William Steele (cricketer) (born 1946), South African cricketer
- William Steele (rugby union) (born 1947), Scotland international rugby union player
- Bill Steele (ice hockey) (born 1952), Scottish-Canadian ice hockey player
- Billy Steele (footballer, born 1955) (born 1955), Scottish footballer, see List of Norwich City F.C. players (25–99 appearances)
- Billy Steele (born 1956), Scottish footballer

== Others ==
- William L. Steele (1875–1949), American architect
- William Steele (actor) (1888–1966), American actor
- William O. Steele (1917–1979), American author
- Bill Steele (cave explorer) (born 1948 as Charles William Steele), American speleologist

== Other uses ==
- William Steele & Sons Company, architectural firm in Philadelphia, Pennsylvania

== See also ==
- William Steel (disambiguation)
