= Govier =

Govier is a surname. Notable people with the surname include:

- James Henry Govier (1910–1974), British painter and etcher
- Katherine Govier (born 1948), Canadian novelist and essayist
- Sheldon Govier (1876-1951), American soccer player
- Steve Govier (born 1952) English football player
- Trudy Govier (born 1944), Canadian philosopher
