= Albert Holmes =

Albert Holmes may refer to:

- Albert Holmes (footballer, born 1942), English football full back
- Albert Holmes (footballer, born 1885) (1885–?), English football outside left
- Albert Holmes (cricketer)

== See also ==
- Bert Holmes, footballer
