= 1952–53 Brentford F.C. season =

English football team season

Brentford
1952–53 season
- Chairman: Frank Davis
- Manager: Jimmy Bain (until 2 January 1953); Tommy Lawton (from 2 January 1953)
- Stadium: Griffin Park
- Second Division: 17th
- FA Cup: Fourth round
- Top goalscorer: League: Lawton (13); All: Lawton (15)
- Highest home attendance: 29,241
- Lowest home attendance: 8,565
- Average home league attendance: 17,474
Home colours

During the 1952–53 English football season, Brentford competed in the Football League Second Division. A forgettable season, during which Tommy Lawton was appointed as the club's player-manager, ended with a 17th-place finish.

== Season summary ==
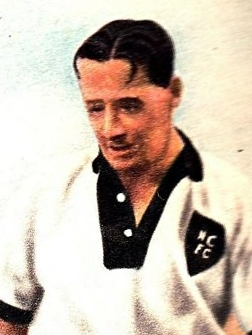
Forward Tommy Lawton was appointed as player-manager in January 1953

Brentford's 1952–53 pre-season preparations were thrown into disarray by the departure of secretary-manager Jackie Gibbons in August 1952. In his letter of resignation, Gibbons wrote of having failed to see "eye to eye" with the Brentford board. Long-serving assistant manager Jimmy Bain took over as caretaker until a permanent appointment could be made. 34-year-old forward Les Smith was the club's only signing and returned to Griffin Park after six years with Aston Villa. Half backs Bill Slater and forwards Johnny Paton and Jimmy Bowie were the only departures of note.

Brentford had a poor start to the Second Division season and won just five of the opening 20 matches. Four defeats and no wins in a five-match spell in September 1952 led caretaker Bain to break up his settled XI and experiment with moving players into different positions. Want-away captain Ron Greenwood left for First Division club Chelsea in October 1952 and forward Jimmy D'Arcy arrived in part-exchange. The tide began to turn after back to back victories over Barnsley on Christmas Day and Boxing Day. Forward Tommy Lawton was announced as Brentford's player-manager on 2 January 1953 and Jimmy Bain reverted to his role as assistant. Lawton was unbeaten in 9 of his first 12 matches, but the team lost confidence after a pair of heavy defeats in March and slumped to a 17th-place finish.

== League table ==
Pos	Team	Pld	W	D	L	GF	GA	GAv	Pts
15	Lincoln City	42	11	17	14	64	71	0.901	39
16	Everton	42	12	14	16	71	75	0.947	38
17	Brentford	42	13	11	18	59	76	0.776	37
18	Hull City	42	14	8	20	57	69	0.826	36
19	Notts County	42	14	8	20	60	88	0.682	36

Rules for classification: 1) Points; 2) Goal average; 3) Goals scored

== Results ==
Brentford's goal tally listed first.

=== Legend ===
Win	Draw	Loss

=== Football League Second Division ===
No.	Date	Opponent	Venue	Result	Attendance	Scorer(s)
1	23 August 1952	Lincoln City	H	1–0	27,787	Goodwin
2	27 August 1952	Huddersfield Town	A	0–0	21,358	
3	30 August 1952	Hull City	A	2–2	35,993	Dare, Monk (pen)
4	3 September 1952	Huddersfield Town	H	1–3	21,733	Lawton
5	6 September 1952	Blackburn Rovers	H	3–2	21,904	Sperrin, Lawton, Monk (pen)
6	8 September 1952	Sheffield United	A	2–3	17,397	Goodwin, Ledgerton
7	13 September 1952	Nottingham Forest	A	0–3	26,923	
8	17 September 1952	Sheffield United	H	0–0	11,707	
9	20 September 1952	Everton	H	2–4	21,042	Lawton, Harper
10	27 September 1952	Bury	A	0–3	12,398	
11	4 October 1952	Doncaster Rovers	A	2–0	13,465	Monk, Goodwin
12	11 October 1952	Southampton	H	3–0	17,225	Lawton, Monk (pen), Smith
13	18 October 1952	Notts County	A	0–4	26,033	
14	25 October 1952	Leicester City	H	4–2	21,655	Goodwin, Lawton (2), Dare
15	1 November 1952	West Ham United	A	1–3	23,263	D'Arcy
16	8 November 1952	Fulham	H	2–2	29,241	D'Arcy, Monk (pen)
17	15 November 1952	Rotherham United	A	1–4	15,427	Monk (pen)
18	22 November 1952	Plymouth Argyle	H	1–2	17,192	Lawton
19	29 November 1952	Leeds United	A	2–3	16,077	Dare, Ledgerton
20	13 December 1952	Birmingham City	A	1–3	9,963	Lawton
21	20 December 1952	Lincoln City	A	0–0	11,953	
22	25 December 1952	Barnsley	H	4–0	15,976	Sperrin, Dare, Lawton (2)
23	26 December 1952	Barnsley	A	2–0	13,725	McNeil (og), Ledgerton
24	3 January 1953	Hull City	H	1–0	16,035	D'Arcy
25	17 January 1953	Blackburn Rovers	A	0–3	21,487	
26	24 January 1953	Nottingham Forest	H	1–1	15,110	Ledgerton
27	7 February 1953	Everton	A	0–5	36,431	
28	14 February 1953	Bury	H	2–2	9,387	Sperrin, Bloomfield
29	21 February 1953	Doncaster Rovers	H	1–0	16,716	Lawton
30	28 February 1953	Southampton	A	2–0	20,327	Ellerington (og), Dare
31	7 March 1953	Notts County	H	5–0	16,147	Monk (pen), Harper, Dare, Lawton (2)
32	14 March 1953	Leicester City	A	3–2	21,307	Morrad, Latimer
33	21 March 1953	West Ham United	H	1–4	18,117	Latimer
34	28 March 1953	Fulham	A	0–5	25,550	
35	3 April 1953	Swansea Town	H	0–0	17,876	
36	4 April 1953	Rotherham United	H	1–1	14,411	Bloomfield
37	6 April 1953	Swansea Town	A	2–3	21,695	Ledgerton, Godwin
38	11 April 1953	Plymouth Argyle	A	0–1	19,955	
39	18 April 1953	Leeds United	H	3–3	12,783	Ledgerton, Coote, Lawton
40	22 April 1953	Luton Town	H	1–1	16,347	Ledgerton
41	25 April 1953	Luton Town	A	1–0	15,826	Dare
42	1 May 1953	Birmingham City	H	1–2	8,565	

=== FA Cup ===
Round	Date	Opponent	Venue	Result	Attendance	Scorer(s)
3R	10 January 1953	Leeds United	H	2–1	27,000	Ledgerton, Lawton
4R	31 January 1953	Aston Villa	A	0–0	40,625	
4R (replay)	4 February 1953	Aston Villa	H	1–2	21,735	Lawton

- Sources: 100 Years Of Brentford, Statto, 11v11

== Playing squad ==
Players' ages are as of the opening day of the 1952–53 season.

Pos.	Name	Nat.	Date of birth (age)	Signed from	Signed in	Notes
Goalkeepers						
GK	Alf Jefferies	(England)	9 February 1922 (aged 30)	Oxford City	1945	
GK	Reg Newton	(England)	30 June 1926 (aged 26)	Leyton Orient	1949	
Defenders						
DF	Ken Horne	(England)	25 June 1926 (aged 26)	Blackpool	1950	
DF	Tecwyn Jones	(Wales)	3 January 1930 (aged 22)	Holywell Town	1950	
DF	Fred Monk	(England)	9 October 1920 (aged 31)	Guildford City	1948	
DF	Roddy Munro	(Scotland)	27 July 1920 (aged 32)	Rangers	1946	
Midfielders						
HB	Wally Bragg	(England)	8 July 1929 (aged 23)	Twickenham Celtic	1946	
HB	George Bristow	(England)	25 June 1933 (aged 19)	Youth	1950	
HB	Ken Coote	(England)	19 May 1928 (aged 24)	Wembley	1949	
HB	Ian Dargie	(England)	3 October 1931 (aged 20)	Tonbridge	1952	
HB	Tony Harper	(England)	26 May 1925 (aged 27)	Headington United	1948	
HB	Frank Latimer	(England)	3 October 1923 (aged 28)	Snowdown Colliery Welfare	1945	
Forwards						
FW	Jimmy Bloomfield	(England)	15 February 1934 (aged 18)	Hayes	1952	
FW	Micky Bull	(England)	3 April 1930 (aged 22)	Youth	1948	
FW	Jimmy D'Arcy	(Northern Ireland)	14 December 1921 (aged 30)	Chelsea	1952	
FW	Billy Dare	(England)	14 February 1927 (aged 25)	Hendon	1948	
FW	Verdi Godwin	(England)	11 February 1926 (aged 26)	Grimsby Town	1952	
FW	Jackie Goodwin	(England)	29 September 1920 (aged 31)	Birmingham City	1949	
FW	Tommy Lawton	(England)	6 October 1919 (aged 32)	Notts County	1952	
FW	Terry Ledgerton	(England)	7 October 1930 (aged 21)	Huyton	1950	
FW	Frank Morrad	(England)	28 February 1920 (aged 32)	Brighton & Hove Albion	1951	
FW	Les Smith	(England)	13 March 1918 (aged 34)	Aston Villa	1952	
FW	Billy Sperrin	(England)	9 April 1922 (aged 30)	Guildford City	1949	
Players who left the club mid-season
HB	Ron Greenwood (c)	(England)	11 November 1921 (aged 30)	Bradford Park Avenue	1949	Transferred to Chelsea

- Sources: 100 Years Of Brentford, Timeless Bees

== Coaching staff ==
=== Jimmy Bain (23 August 1952 – 2 January 1953) ===
Name	Role
(Scotland) Jimmy Bain	Caretaker Manager
(England) David Richards	Trainer
(England) Jack Cartmell	Assistant trainer

=== Tommy Lawton (2 January 1953 – 1 May 1953) ===
Name	Role
(England) Tommy Lawton	Player-Manager
(Scotland) Jimmy Bain	Assistant manager
(England) David Richards	Trainer
(England) Jack Cartmell	Assistant trainer

== Statistics ==
=== Appearances and goals ===

Brentford's highest appearance-makers in each position during the Football League season.

Pos	Nat	Name	League		FA Cup		Total	
Pos	Nat	Name	Apps	Goals	Apps	Goals	Apps	Goals
GK	(England)	Alf Jefferies	35	0	3	0	38	0
GK	(England)	Reg Newton	7	0	0	0	7	0
DF	(England)	Ken Horne	10	0	0	0	10	0
DF	(Wales)	Tecwyn Jones	4	0	0	0	4	0
DF	(England)	Fred Monk	40	7	3	0	43	7
DF	(Scotland)	Roddy Munro	34	0	3	0	37	0
HB	(England)	Wally Bragg	38	0	3	0	41	0
HB	(England)	George Bristow	5	0	0	0	5	0
HB	(England)	Ken Coote	17	1	0	0	17	1
HB	(England)	Ian Dargie	10	0	0	0	10	0
HB	(England)	Ron Greenwood	9	0	—		9	0
HB	(England)	Tony Harper	36	3	3	0	39	3
HB	(England)	Frank Latimer	30	3	3	0	33	3
FW	(England)	Jimmy Bloomfield	15	2	0	0	15	2
FW	(England)	Micky Bull	3	0	0	0	3	0
FW	(Northern Ireland)	Jimmy D'Arcy	13	3	0	0	13	3
FW	(England)	Billy Dare	33	8	3	0	36	8
FW	(England)	Verdi Godwin	6	1	0	0	6	1
FW	(England)	Jackie Goodwin	24	4	3	0	27	4
FW	(England)	Tommy Lawton	34	13	3	2	37	15
FW	(England)	Terry Ledgerton	28	7	3	1	31	8
FW	(England)	Frank Morrad	5	1	0	0	5	1
FW	(England)	Les Smith	14	1	0	0	14	1
FW	(England)	Billy Sperrin	12	3	3	0	15	3

- Players listed in italics left the club mid-season.
- Source: 100 Years Of Brentford

=== Goalscorers ===
Pos.	Nat	Player	FL2	FAC	Total
FW	(England)	Tommy Lawton	13	2	15
FW	(England)	Billy Dare	8	0	8
FW	(England)	Terry Ledgerton	7	1	8
DF	(England)	Fred Monk	7	0	7
FW	(England)	Jackie Goodwin	4	0	4
FW	(Northern Ireland)	Jimmy D'Arcy	3	0	3
HB	(England)	Tony Harper	3	0	3
HB	(England)	Frank Latimer	3	0	3
FW	(England)	Billy Sperrin	3	0	3
FW	(England)	Jimmy Bloomfield	2	0	2
HB	(England)	Ken Coote	1	0	1
FW	(England)	Verdi Godwin	1	0	1
FW	(England)	Frank Morrad	1	0	1
FW	(England)	Les Smith	1	0	1
Opponents			2	0	2
Total			59	3	62

- Players listed in italics left the club mid-season.
- Source: 100 Years Of Brentford

=== International caps ===
Pos.	Nat	Player	Caps	Goals	Ref
FW	(Northern Ireland)	Jimmy D'Arcy	4	1	

=== Management ===
Name	Nat	From	To	Record All Comps					Record League				
Name	Nat	From	To	P	W	D	L	W %	P	W	D	L	W %
Jimmy Bain	(Scotland)	23 August 1952	26 December 1952	23	7	5	11	30.43	23	7	5	11	30.43
Tommy Lawton	(England)	3 January 1952	1 May 1953	22	7	7	8	31.82	19	6	6	7	31.58

=== Summary ===
Games played	45 (42 Second Division, 3 FA Cup)
Games won	13 (13 Second Division, 1 FA Cup)
Games drawn	12 (11 Second Division, 1 FA Cup)
Games lost	19 (18 Second Division, 1 FA Cup)
Goals scored	62 (59 Second Division, 3 FA Cup)
Goals conceded	79 (76 Second Division, 3 FA Cup)
Clean sheets	15 (14 Second Division, 1 FA Cup)
Biggest league win	5–0 versus Notts County, 7 March 1953
Worst league defeat	5–0 on two occasions
Most appearances	43, Fred Monk (43 Second Division, 3 FA Cup)
Top scorer (league)	13, Tommy Lawton
Top scorer (all competitions)	15, Tommy Lawton

== Transfers & loans ==
Players transferred in
Date	Pos.	Name	Previous club	Fee	Ref.
June 1952	FW	(England) Les Smith	(England) Aston Villa	n/a	
October 1952	FW	(England) Bert Allum	(England) Hereford United	n/a	
October 1952	HB	(England) Jimmy Bloomfield	(England) Hayes	n/a	
October 1952	FW	(Northern Ireland) Jimmy D'Arcy	(England) Chelsea	Part-exchange	
November 1952	FW	(England) Vernon Avis	Unattached	n/a	
November 1952	FW	(England) John Pearson	(England) Chase of Chertsey	n/a	
March 1953	HB	(England) Leonard Geard	(England) Fulham	n/a	
Players transferred out
Date	Pos.	Name	Subsequent club	Fee	Ref.
July 1952	FW	(Scotland) Jimmy Bowie	(England) Watford	n/a	
July 1952	FW	(Scotland) Johnny Paton	(England) Watford	n/a	
August 1952	DF	(England) Wally Quinton	(England) Shrewsbury Town	n/a	
August 1952	HB	(England) Bill Slater	(England) Wolverhampton Wanderers	Amateur	
October 1952	HB	(England) Ron Greenwood	(England) Chelsea	Part-exchange	
Players released
Date	Pos.	Name	Subsequent club	Join date	Ref.
May 1953	DF	(England) Frank Morrad	(England) Bedford Town	n/a	
May 1953	DF	(Scotland) Roddy Munro	(England) Cambridge City	n/a	
