= Sid Bidewell =

English footballer and manager

Personal information
- Full name: Sidney Henry Bidewell
- Date of birth: 6 June 1918
- Place of birth: Watford, England
- Date of death: 18 November 2003 (aged 85)
- Place of death: Colchester, Essex
- Position: Inside forward

Senior career*
Years	Team	Apps	(Gls)
- St Albans City
- Wealdstone
1937–1946	Chelsea	4	(2)
- → Wrexham (guest)
- → Southampton (guest)
1946	→ Colchester United (guest)	1	(0)
1946–1948	Gravesend & Northfleet		
1948–1951	Chelmsford City		
Total		5	(2)

Managerial career
- Hemel Hempstead
- * Club domestic league appearances and goals

Sidney Henry Bidewell (6 June 1918 – 18 November 2003) was an English professional footballer and manager who played as an inside forward in the Football League for Chelsea.

After playing for St Albans City and Wealdstone, Bidewell joined Chelsea in May 1937, scoring twice on his debut and going on to make a further three appearances for the club. The outbreak of war put his professional career on hold, but continued to make wartime appearances for Chelsea, Wrexham, Southampton and Colchester United. After the war, he joined Gravesend & Northfleet and then Chelmsford City before becoming manager at Hemel Hempstead.

== Career ==
Born in Watford, Bidewell's early career began with St Albans City and Wealdstone before joining Chelsea in May 1937. Owing to injuries to regular forwards Joe Bambrick and George Mills, Bidewell was handed his Football League debut on 4 December 1937 against Huddersfield Town, scoring twice in the 3–1 win. His Chelsea career was cut short by the outbreak of World War. A lance corporal in the British Army, Bidewell played 18 wartime league and cup games for the club, as well as making guest appearances for Wrexham, Southampton, and Colchester United.

Bidewell joined Colchester's 1945–46 Southern League campaign as the season turned to Southern League Cup fixtures. He made his debut for the club on 16 March 1946 in their 0–0 draw with Cardiff City Reserves in the final game of Colchester's league campaign. He scored four cup goals in six Southern League Cup games, scoring his first in a 2–0 win over Swindon Town Reserves on 23 March.

After the war, Bidewell signed for Gravesend & Northfleet, and then joined Chelmsford City in 1948 where he remained for three years, before becoming manager at Hemel Hempstead.
