= Micky Bull =

English footballer (1930–2011)

Personal information
- Full name: Michael Frederick Bull
- Date of birth: 3 April 1930
- Place of birth: Twickenham, England
- Date of death: December 2011 (aged 81)
- Place of death: Kingston upon Hull, England
- Position: Outside forward

Youth career
- –1948: Polytechnic

Senior career*
Years	Team	Apps	(Gls)
1948–1953	Brentford	3	(0)
1953–1955	Swindon Town	69	(15)
1955–1956	Hastings United		
1956–1959	Bedford Town	189	(51)
- Hastings United
1961–1962	Tonbridge	24	(1)
- Tunbridge Wells United
- Chatham Town
- * Club domestic league appearances and goals

Michael Frederick Bull (3 April 1930 – December 2011) was an English professional footballer who played in the Football League for Brentford and Swindon Town as an outside forward. He later had a career in non-League football, most notably with Bedford Town.

== Club career ==
=== Brentford ===
An outside forward, Bull began his career at Second Division club Brentford in September 1948, but had to wait until 1953 to make his first team debut for the club. His only appearances for the club came in three matches in February 1953, against Everton, Bury and Doncaster Rovers. Bull was released at the end of the 1952–53 season.

=== Swindon Town ===
Bull joined Third Division South club Swindon Town in June 1953 and had a good first season with the struggling team, making 43 appearances, scoring 12 goals and finishing as the club's top scorer. His form deserted him during the 1954–55 season and he scored just three goals in 29 appearances, before departing at the end of the campaign. Bull made 72 appearances and scored 15 goals for the Robins.

=== Non-League football ===
After his release from Swindon, Bull dropped into non-League football and played for Hastings United, Tonbridge, Tunbridge Wells United and Chatham Town. A memorable spell came with Southern League club Bedford Town, for whom he scored 51 goals in 189 appearances. He finished his time with the club by winning the South East Division championship in the 1958–59 season.

== Career statistics ==
Appearances and goals by club, season and competition
Club	Season	League			FA Cup		Other		Total	
Club	Season	Division	Apps	Goals	Apps	Goals	Apps	Goals	Apps	Goals
Brentford	1952–53	Second Division	3	0	0	0	―		3	0
Swindon Town	1953–54	Third Division South	41	12	2	0	―		43	12
Swindon Town	1954–55	Third Division South	28	3	1	0	―		29	3
Swindon Town	Total		69	15	3	0	―		72	15
Tonbridge	1961–62	Southern League Premier Division	24	1	1	0	11 (Note: 7 appearances and 2 goals in Kent Floodlit Cup, 2 appearances in Kent Senior Shield, 1 appearance and 1 goal in Southern League Cup, 1 appearance in Kent Senior Cup)	3	36	4
Career total			96	16	4	0	11	3	111	19

== Honours ==
Bedford Town

- Southern League South East Division: 1958–59
