= William Steel =

William, Willie, Bill or Billy Steel may refer to:

- William Gladstone Steel (1854–1934), American conservationist considered by many to be the father of Crater Lake National Park
- William Steel (golfer) (fl. 1860), Scottish golfer
- William Arthur Steel (1890–1968), Canadian Army officer and radio pioneer
- Willie Steel (1908–1990), Scottish footballer
- Bill Steel (born 1939), British actor and television and radio broadcaster
- Billy Steel (1923–1982), Scottish international footballer
- Jim Steel (footballer) (William James Steel, born 1959), Scottish footballer

== See also ==
- William Steele (disambiguation)
