= Bert Goffey =

English footballer

Personal information
- Full name: Herbert Henry Goffey
- Date of birth: 9 May 1911
- Place of birth: Sundridge, Kent, England
- Date of death: 1991 (aged 80)
- Place of death: Northampton, England
- Height: 5 ft 9 in (1.75 m)
- Position: Inside forward

Senior career*
Years	Team	Apps	(Gls)
- Sevenoaks Town
- Higham Ferrers Town
1931	Northampton Town		
1932	Bristol Rovers		
- Northampton Nomads
1934–1937	Norwich City	32	(9)
1937–1942	Brighton & Hove Albion	52	(9)
- * Club domestic league appearances and goals

Herbert Henry Goffey (9 May 1911 – 1991) was an English professional footballer who played as an inside forward in the Football League for Norwich City and Brighton & Hove Albion.

== Life and career ==
Goffey was born in 1911 in Sundridge, Kent. He played local football with Sevenoaks Town and then in the Northampton area with Northampton Nomads and Higham Ferrers Town, and had unsuccessful trials with Football League clubs Northampton Town and Bristol Rovers, before signing for Norwich City in late 1934, initially as an amateur. He scored nine goals from 32 Second Division matches over two seasons, and then dropped down a level to join Brighton & Hove Albion for a "sizeable" fee in June 1937. After three months in the reserves, he displaced Jimmy Cargill from the team and established himself as first-team regular. In the 18 months before league football was suspended for the duration of the Second World War, he played in 56 matches in all competitions and scored nine goals.

Goffey served as an Army physical training instructor. He was evacuated from Dunkirk in 1940, and went on to serve in Italy where he was mentioned in despatches in 1944. After the war, he settled in Northampton where he worked on the railway. He died in the town in 1991 at the age of 80.
