= Jimmy D'Arcy =

Northern Irish footballer

Personal information
- Full name: Seamus Donal D'Arcy
- Date of birth: 14 December 1921
- Place of birth: Newry, Northern Ireland
- Date of death: 22 February 1985 (aged 63)
- Place of death: Sudbury Hill, England
- Height: 5 ft 11 in (1.80 m)
- Position: Inside forward

Senior career*
Years	Team	Apps	(Gls)
- Waterford
1943–1946	Limerick		
1946	Dundalk	0	(0)
1946–1947	Newry Town		
1947–1948	Ballymena United	17	(11)
1948–1951	Charlton Athletic	13	(1)
1951–1952	Chelsea	23	(12)
1952–1954	Brentford	13	(3)
Total		58	(20)

International career
1952–1953	Northern Ireland	5	(1)
1953	IFA XI		
- * Club domestic league appearances and goals

Seamus Donal D'Arcy (14 December 1921 – 22 February 1985), known as Jimmy D'Arcy or sometimes Paddy D'Arcy, was a Northern Irish international footballer who played as an inside forward.

== Career ==
After playing in the Republic of Ireland for Waterford, Limerick, Dundalk and in Northern Ireland for Ballymena United, D'Arcy played professionally in the Football League for Charlton Athletic, Chelsea and Brentford, before his retirement in 1954. He also represented the IFA XI. An ankle injury ended D'Arcy's career in 1954 and the following year he returned to Charlton Athletic to serve as Development Association Officer for eight months.

== Personal life ==
After retiring from football, D'Arcy settled in Sudbury Hill and worked as a quality inspector for a local glass manufacturing company.

== Career statistics ==
Appearances and goals by club, season and competition
Club	Season	League			National cup (Note: Includes FAI Cup, Irish Cup, FA Cup)		Other		Total	
Club	Season	Division	Apps	Goals	Apps	Goals	Apps	Goals	Apps	Goals
Dundalk	1946–47	League of Ireland	0	0	―		9 (Note: 6 appearances and 3 goals in Dublin City Cup, 3 appearances and 1 goal in League of Ireland Shield)	4	9	4
Ballymena United	1947–48	Irish League	17	11	1	1	12 (Note: 11 appearances and 5 goals in City Cup, 1 appearance and 2 goals in Gold Cup)	7	30	19
Chelsea	1951–52	First Division	21	12	8	1	―		29	13
Chelsea	1952–53	First Division	2	0	0	0	―		2	0
Chelsea	Total		23	12	8	1	―		31	12
Brentford	1952–53	Second Division	13	3	0	0	―		13	3
Career total			53	26	9	2	21	11	63	38
