= Ray Dring =

English footballer

Personal information
- Full name: Raymond Dring
- Date of birth: 13 February 1924
- Place of birth: Lincoln, England
- Date of death: October 2003
- Position: Goalkeeper

Senior career*
Years	Team	Apps	(Gls)
1947–1948	Huddersfield Town	4	(0)
- * Club domestic league appearances and goals

Raymond "Ray" Dring (13 February 1924 - October 2003) is a former professional footballer who played as a goalkeeper for Huddersfield Town. He was born in Lincoln.
