= Ernest Steele =

English footballer

Personal information
- Full name: Ernest Steele
- Date of birth: 18 June 1908
- Place of birth: Middleton, England
- Date of death: 1994 (aged 85–86)
- Position: Winger

Senior career*
Years	Team	Apps	(Gls)
	Rochdale	19	(3)
	Oldham Athletic	14	(1)
1933–1934	Torquay United		
1934–1936	Notts County	54	(9)
1936	Bath City	22	(0)
1936–1937	Millwall	37	(9)
1938–1939	Crystal Palace	33	(9)
1939	Rochdale		
1946	→ Colchester United (guest)	1	(0)
- Barry
- Northwich Victoria
- Ossett Town
Total		180	(31)
- * Club domestic league appearances and goals

Ernest Steele (18 June 1908 – 1994) was an English professional footballer who played as a winger in the Football League for Rochdale on two occasions, Oldham Athletic, Torquay United, Notts County, Millwall and Crystal Palace.

Steele began his professional career at Rochdale, before moving to Oldham, Torquay and Notts County. After briefly moving out of the Football League to Bath City in 1936, he returned with Millwall leading to a move to Crystal Palace. He returned to Rochdale in 1939, but his professional career was ended by the outbreak of World War II. During the war, he made one guest appearance for Colchester United, and later played in non-League football for Barry, Northwich Victoria and Ossett Town.

== Career ==
Steele's professional career began with Rochdale in 1931, where he made 19 Football League appearances, scoring three goals. He made a move to Oldham Athletic, where he added 14 more appearances and a further goal, and then moved to Torquay United for the 1933–34 season. He then spent two seasons with Notts County, where he made 54 League appearances and scored nine goals. He stepped out of the Football League in the summer of 1936 to play for Bath City, where he amassed 22 appearances but failed to score. He returned to League football with Millwall, where he made 37 appearances and scored nine goals in the 1936–37 season. Steele moved to Crystal Palace in September 1938, where he spent one season. He made 33 appearances and scored nine goals for the club, before returning to Rochdale for the ill-fated 1939–40 season.

Steele's professional career came to an end with the outbreak of World War II. He made one guest appearance for Colchester United in their first season following hostilities in the Southern League on 2 February 1946, playing in an 8–0 defeat by his former side Bath City. He was recommended to guest for the club from his Army station in Yeovil and as a former Millwall colleague of Colchester's Bill Bower.

After the war, Steele would later play for Barry, Northwich Victoria and Ossett Town.
