= Douglas Smale =

English footballer (1916–2006)

Personal information
- Full name: Douglas Martin Smale
- Date of birth: 27 March 1916
- Place of birth: Victoria, London, England
- Date of death: 2006 (aged 89–90)
- Height: 5 ft 7 in (1.70 m)
- Position: Winger

Senior career*
Years	Team	Apps	(Gls)
- Kingstonian
1936–1946	Chelsea	9	(0)
- → Queens Park Rangers (guest)
- → Norwich City (guest)
	→ Plymouth Argyle (guest)	3	(0)
- → Torquay United (guest)
1946	→ Colchester United (guest)	2	(1)
- Merthyr Tydfil
Total		14	(1)
- * Club domestic league appearances and goals

Douglas Martin Smale (27 March 1916 – 2006) was an English professional footballer who played as a winger in the Football League for Chelsea.

Having started out in non-League football with Kingstonian, Smale signed for Chelsea in 1936, where he made nine Football League appearances before the outbreak of World War II. During the war years, Smale made guest appearances for Queens Park Rangers, Norwich City, Plymouth Argyle, Torquay United, and Colchester United. He later played for Merthyr Tydfil.

== Career ==
Born in Victoria, London, Smale began his career as an amateur playing for Kingstonian. He signed for Chelsea in 1936, and went on to make his debut on 29 March 1937 in a 1–0 defeat to Charlton Athletic. Smale had difficulty in ousting regular left-winger Alf Hanson, and before the outbreak of World War II, he could only manage nine first-team appearances in the Football League.

Smale served as a leading aircraftman in the Royal Air Force in India during hostilities, but he was still able to register three wartime appearances for Chelsea, while also making guest appearances for Queens Park Rangers, Norwich City, Plymouth Argyle, Torquay United, and Colchester United.

At Plymouth, Smale joined in November 1945 as a guest for three matches. His first was a 4–2 defeat for Argyle against Aston Villa in the Football League South on 10 November, and his final game two weeks later in a 4–0 home defeat by Arsenal.

Smale made two guest appearances in the Southern League for Colchester United in February 1946, and he remained with the club for the rest of their campaign, playing in six Southern League Cup games. He scored two goals during his time with Colchester.

After Smale left Chelsea, he played for Merthyr Tydfil. Until his death in 2006, Smale was the oldest surviving Chelsea player.
