= Jack Southam =

English footballer

Personal information
- Full name: James Henry Southam
- Date of birth: 19 August 1917
- Place of birth: Willenhall, England
- Date of death: October 1996 (aged 79)
- Place of death: Walsall, England
- Height: 5 ft 7 in (1.70 m)
- Position: Full-back

Senior career*
Years	Team	Apps	(Gls)
- Shornhill Recreation
1939–1946	West Bromwich Albion		
- → Arsenal (guest)
- → Aberaman (guest)
- → Newport County (guest)
1945–1946	→ Colchester United (guest)	11	(1)
1946	→ Ipswich Town (guest)		
1946	Newport County	8	(0)
1946–1949	Birmingham City	1	(0)
1949–1955	Northampton Town	145	(1)
Total		165	(2)
- * Club domestic league appearances and goals

James Henry "Jack" Southam (19 August 1917 – October 1996), also known as Jimmy Southam, was an English professional footballer who played as a full-back in the Football League for Newport County, Birmingham City, and most notably Northampton Town, where he amassed 145 league appearances between 1949 and 1955.

Beginning his career with Shornhill Recreation, Southam joined West Bromwich Albion, for whom he featured during the war years. He made guest appearances for Arsenal, Aberaman, Newport County, Colchester United and Ipswich Town before he joined Newport ahead of the 1946–47 season. The same year, he joined Birmingham City, but made just one league appearance before signing for Northampton Town in 1949. He spent six years with the club, before returning to the Midlands to join the coaching staff at Walsall.

== Career ==
Born in Willenhall, Southam began his playing career with Shornhill Recreation before joining up with Football League side West Bromwich Albion in 1939. During the war years, Southam was a private in the 15th Infantry Training Corps and made 34 wartime appearances for Albion between 1942 and 1946. He made guest appearances for numerous clubs, including Arsenal, Aberaman, and Newport County.

Southam joined Southern League side Colchester United as a guest player ahead of the 1945–46 season. After joining on 20 July 1945, Southam made his debut on 25 August in a 2–1 win over rivals Chelmsford City before scoring his first and only goal for the club on 29 September in a 4–1 defeat by Bedford Town. Having become a regular in Colchester's first-team, Southam grew tired of being played in a number of positions, having worn six different shirt numbers, and decided to join Ipswich Town after Christmas 1946. Southam made 11 appearances for Ipswich in the Football League South (North), making his debut on 19 January 1946 in Town's 1–0 win against Queens Park Rangers at Portman Road. Southam did continue to guest for Colchester, making his final appearance against Chelmsford on 11 April 1946.

Having played three times for Newport County during the war years, Southam moved to the club from West Brom for a £300 fee ahead of the 1946–47 season. He made eight Second Division appearances for Newport before joining Birmingham City the same year. Described as "a steady, reliable full-back", Southam played just twice in the FA Cup and once in the league for Birmingham before joining Northampton Town in 1949. In his first season, he helped the club to the runners-up spot in the Third Division South, going on to make 145 league appearances for the club, scoring one goal.

Following his retirement from playing in 1955, Southam joined Walsall as a trainer, remaining on the coaching staff until the 1960s.
