= Billy Leighton =

English footballer

Personal information
- Full name: William Alexander Leighton
- Date of birth: 8 December 1914
- Place of birth: Walker, Newcastle upon Tyne, Northumberland, England
- Date of death: 1981 (aged 66–67)
- Height: 5 ft 9 1/2 in (1.77 m)
- Position: Forward

Youth career
- Meldon Villa
- Walker Park

Senior career*
Years	Team	Apps	(Gls)
1932–1938	Newcastle United	39	(8)
1938–1939	Southend United	16	(2)
- EKCO Sports
1945–1946	Colchester United (guest)	3	(0)
Total		58	(10)
- * Club domestic league appearances and goals

William Alexander Leighton (8 December 1914 – 1981) was an English footballer who played in the Football League as a forward for Newcastle United and Southend United.

== Career ==
Born in Walker, Newcastle upon Tyne, Leighton joined Newcastle United from local amateur football. After signing in February 1932 from Walker Park, he made his Football League debut on 4 February 1933 in a First Division 2–0 win over Chelsea. He scored his first goal for the club on 21 March 1934 in a 1–1 away draw with Manchester City.

Leighton made a total of 39 appearances in the First and Second Divisions for Newcastle between 1932 and 1938. He was widely seen as a second-choice player, and after making his final appearance in a 1–0 defeat against Barnsley at St James' Park on 1 September 1937, Leighton moved to Southend United in search of first-team football.

Leighton made 16 league appearances for Southend, scoring twice, but was unable to secure a regular starting position due to the Second World War as all leagues were suspended. He also had a brief spell with Southend-based team EKCO Sports.

Towards the end of the war, with Leighton stationed at Colchester Garrison, he signed briefly with Colchester United who played in the Southern League which had restarted for the 1945–46 season. He made his debut for the U's on 29 December 1945 in a 1–0 defeat to Cheltenham Town at Whaddon Road. He made three Southern League appearances for Colchester and made his final appearance for the club in a Southern League Cup victory against Guildford City on 19 January 1946.

Billy Leighton died in 1981.
