= Charlie Jones (footballer, born 1911) =

Welsh footballer (1911–1985)

Charles Jones
Personal information
- Full name: Charles Jones
- Date of birth: 22 November 1911
- Place of birth: Mynyddislwyn, Wales
- Date of death: 4 June 1985 (aged 73)
- Place of death: Norfolk, England
- Height: 5 ft 11 in (1.80 m)
- Position: Centre half

Senior career*
Years	Team	Apps	(Gls)
- Ebbw Vale
- Northfleet United
1934–1935	Tottenham Hotspur	18	(0)
1937–1939	Southend United	22	(2)
- * Club domestic league appearances and goals

Charles Jones (22 November 1911 – 4 June 1985) was a Welsh professional footballer who played for Ebbw Vale, Northfleet United, Tottenham Hotspur and Southend United.

== Football career ==
After initially playing for Ebbw Vale, Jones joined the Tottenham Hotspur "nursery" team Northfleet United. The centre half signed for Tottenham Hotspur in 1934, making his debut against Leeds United at White Hart Lane on 22 December 1934, and played a total of 18 matches for the Spurs. In May 1937 Jones made his debut for Southend United and went on to make 26 appearances and scoring twice in all competitions before the outbreak of World War II during which he served as a seaman in the RNPS.
