= Albert Day (English footballer) =

English footballer (1918–1983)

Personal information
- Date of birth: 7 March 1918
- Place of birth: Camberwell, England
- Date of death: 21 January 1983 (aged 64)
- Place of death: Brighton, England
- Position: Forward

Youth career
- 1934–36: Preston Rovers

Senior career*
Years	Team	Apps	(Gls)
1937–38	Fulham (Amateur)		
1937–38	Hastings & St Leonards		
1938–46	Brighton & Hove Albion	0	(0)
1946–49	Ipswich Town	63	(25)
1949–50	Watford	4	(1)
1950–54	Folkestone Town		
1954–55	Ashford Town		
1955	Crawley Town		
- * Club domestic league appearances and goals

Albert Day (7 March 1918 – 21 January 1983) was an English professional footballer who played as a centre forward. Between 1946 and 1949 playing for Ipswich Town and Watford he made a total of 67 appearances in the Football League, scoring 26 goals.

== Career ==
At 16 years of age Day was playing with the Sussex-based Preston Rovers club: in consecutive seasons they won the Second and then First Division of the Worthing and District League and progressed to the Brighton, Hove & District League. He next joined leading Southern Amateur League club Hastings & St Leonards and additionally between November 1937 and March 1938 was attached as an amateur player to Football League Division Two club Fulham. Whilst he was with Hastings, in the spring of 1938, they won the Amateur Football Alliance Cup and the Sussex Senior Cup (in which he scored a hat-trick). From March 1938, after cessation of his arrangement with Fulham, Day was registered as an amateur player with Brighton & Hove Albion of the Third Division South. In August 1938 his arrangement with Brighton was upgraded when he signed as a professional. However, he did not make any league appearances during the immediately succeeding season, after which his career was interrupted for seven years by the cessation of competitive football owing to World War II.

Day played as a war-time guest player for Reading, Lincoln City and Ipswich Town – for the latter club during the 1945–46 wartime season he played in 21 matches scoring 15 goals. Thereafter football returned to its pre-war competitive format and in the summer of 1946 Day signed for Ipswich Town who resumed playing in the Third Division South. In the ensuing 1946–47 season, now aged 28, he made his football league debut and was the club's leading league goal scorer with 14 goals from his 25 appearances. He played in the majority of the club's league matches the following season, but in the 1948–49 campaign he featured in only three matches and was made available as a free transfer at the season's end. During the summer Day signed for Watford, also of the Third Division South. Early during the next season in August and September 1949 he made four consecutive appearances (in one of which he scored his only Watford goal against his former club Ipswich Town), but did not appear again for the first team for the remainder of the season and was transferred out in the summer of 1950.

Subsequently, Day signed-on with Folkestone Town for the 1950–51 season and remained with the club for almost four seasons. During his time at the club Folkestone Town were Kent League champions in both the 1950–51 and 1952–53 seasons, and in the intervening season won the Kent League Cup. Day was Folkestone's leading scorer in his first two seasons, notching 33 Kent League and Cup goals in 1950–1951 and 42 the following season – the latter total made him the joint-top Kent League and Cup goalscorer that season. He was surpassed as Folkestone's leading scorer over the following 1952–53 campaign (in which he scored 26 league and cup goals of which were 19 were league strikes), and part-way through the next season, having lost his regular first team spot with Folkestone, in February 1954 Day signed with fellow Kent League club Ashford Town. He played 6 league matches for them over the remainder of the 1953–54 season and stayed with them until the end of the following 1954–55 campaign although he played mainly in their Kent League Division II reserves team (scoring 23 goals). Thereafter he had a brief spell with Sussex County League Division 2 club Crawley Town.
