= Geoff Fox (footballer, born 1925) =

English footballer

Personal information
- Date of birth: 19 January 1925
- Place of birth: Bristol, England
- Date of death: 31 December 1993 (aged 68)
- Place of death: Worcester, England
- Position: Full back

Youth career
- ????–1942: Bristol City

Senior career*
Years	Team	Apps	(Gls)
1942–1944	Ipswich Town	0	(0)
1944–1945	Bristol City	0	(0)
1945–1947	Ipswich Town	11	(1)
1947–1955	Bristol Rovers	274	(2)
1955–1957	Swindon Town	48	(0)
1957–????	Pucklechurch		
Total		333	(3)
- * Club domestic league appearances and goals

Geoffrey R. Fox (19 January 1925 – 31 December 1993) was a professional footballer who played as a full back in The Football League for Ipswich Town, Bristol Rovers and Swindon Town.

== Career ==
Born in Bristol in 1925, Fox played schoolboy football for Bristol City but the outbreak of World War II in 1939 meant that his entry into the professional game was delayed, with League football suspended during the hostilities. He played wartime football as an amateur for Ipswich Town and Bristol City, before signing his first professional contract with Ipswich following the war. After making eleven League appearances for Ipswich, scoring once, Fox returned to his home town with Bristol Rovers in 1955. He remained with The Pirates for eight years, playing in 274 League games during that spell and scoring twice. After two years with Swindon Town between 1955 and 1957, Fox retired from professional football and joined non-league team Pucklechurch as a player-coach.

Fox was also a keen cricketer, playing Minor County cricket for Suffolk, and was on the groundstaff of Gloucestershire County Cricket Club from 1952 until 1954. In later life Fox worked as Sales Director for the Harris paint brush company until retiring in 1990. He died of a Myocardial infarction on New Year's Eve 1993 while playing golf.

== Honours ==
=== Club ===
Bristol Rovers

- Football League Third Division South Winner (1): 1952–53
