= Cliff Hubbard =

English footballer

Personal information
- Full name: Clifford Hubbard
- Date of birth: 1911
- Place of birth: Worksop, England
- Date of death: 1962
- Height: 5 ft 7 1/2 in (1.71 m)
- Positions: Outside forward; inside forward

Senior career*
Years	Team	Apps	(Gls)
	Manton Colliery	?	(?)
?–1933	Scunthorpe & Lindsey United	?	(?)
1933–1938	Hull City	183	(56)
1938–1939	West Ham United	4	(3)
	Ransome & Marles	?	(?)
	Goole Town	?	(?)
	Worksop Town	?	(?)
Total		187	(59)
- * Club domestic league appearances and goals

Clifford Hubbard (1911–1962) was an English footballer who played for Hull City and West Ham United in the Football League.
