= George Waites =

English footballer

Personal information
- Full name: George Edward Waites
- Date of birth: 12 March 1938
- Place of birth: Stepney, England
- Date of death: 24 August 2000 (aged 62)
- Place of death: Watford, England
- Height: 5 ft 9 in (1.75 m)
- Positions: Outside forward; inside forward

Senior career*
Years	Team	Apps	(Gls)
1957–1958	Harwich & Parkeston		
1958–1961	Leyton Orient	43	(9)
1961–1962	Norwich City	36	(11)
1962	Leyton Orient	2	(0)
1962–1965	Brighton & Hove Albion	23	(1)
1965–196?	Millwall	0	(0)
- Gravesend & Northfleet
- * Club domestic league appearances and goals

George Edward Waites (12 March 1938 – 24 August 2000) was an English professional footballer who played as an outside forward or inside forward in the Football League for Leyton Orient (two spells), Norwich City and Brighton & Hove Albion. He was on the books of Millwall without making a league appearance, and also played non-league football for Harwich & Parkeston and Gravesend & Northfleet.

Waites was born in 1938 in Stepney, London, and died in 2000 in Watford, Hertfordshire, at the age of 62.
