= Derek Hawksworth =

English footballer (1927–2021)

Personal information
- Full name: Derek Marshall Hawksworth
- Date of birth: 16 July 1927
- Place of birth: Bradford, England
- Date of death: 24 March 2021 (aged 93)
- Position: Winger

Senior career*
Years	Team	Apps	(Gls)
1946	Bradford Park Avenue	0	(0)
1947	Huddersfield Town	0	(0)
1948–1950	Bradford City	75	(20)
1950–1958	Sheffield United	255	(88)
1958–1960	Huddersfield Town	55	(14)
1960–1961	Lincoln City	36	(14)
1961	Bradford City	44	(8)
Total		465	(144)
- * Club domestic league appearances and goals

Derek Marshall Hawksworth (16 July 1927 – 24 March 2021) was a footballer who played in the position of winger for Sheffield United.

== Football career ==
Hawksworth started his career with Bradford Park Avenue in 1946, before moving to Huddersfield Town, although he never made an appearance for either club. In 1948, he moved to Bradford City and made 75 appearances with 20 goals for the West Yorkshire side.

Hawksworth was 23 when he signed for Sheffield United in 1950 in a double transfer along with fellow winger Alf Ringstead, for a total outlay of £15,000. He was strong, fast and dangerous near goal, and was at his best in an outside-left position, but served United well in all the other forward positions.

He played an integral part in United's 7–3 defeat of Sheffield Wednesday in the Steel City derby at Bramall Lane on 8 September 1951, scoring an equaliser and a fourth goal in a match never to be forgotten by Blades fans. In total, he played 255 league matches for Sheffield United, and scored 88 league goals in his seven years at Bramall Lane.

He was transferred to Huddersfield Town in 1958 in an exchange deal, which saw Ronnie Simpson moving to United. He played 55 league matches, scoring 14 goals for the Terriers. In 1959, he signed for Lincoln City, scoring 14 times in 36 league matches.

He ended his career back with Bradford City, for one final year. Scoring eight goals from 44 appearances for the Bantams.

== Death ==
Hawksworth died peacefully at home on 24th March 2021, aged 93, following a short illness. He was surrounded by his family and had received many well wishes from friends.

== Honours ==
=== Club ===
Sheffield United

- Football League Second Division: 1952–53
