= Frank Rawcliffe =

English footballer

Personal information
- Date of birth: 10 December 1921
- Place of birth: Cardiff, England
- Date of death: 4 September 1958 (aged 36–37)
- Place of death: Liverpool, England
- Position: Centre forward

Senior career*
Years	Team	Apps	(Gls)
–	Tranmere Rovers	?	(?)
–	Wolverhampton Wanderers	?	(?)
–	Colchester United	?	(?)
–	Notts County	?	(?)
1946–1947	Newport County	37	(14)
1947–1948	Swansea Town	25	(17)
1948–1949	Aldershot	35	(14)
1949–1950	Alessandria II	27	(18)
–	South Liverpool	?	(?)
–	Alessandria	4	(4)
Total		?	(?)
- * Club domestic league appearances and goals

Frank Rawcliffe (10 December 1921 – December 1986) was an English professional footballer who played as a centre forward.

== Career ==
After representing Cheshire Schoolboys he signed for Tranmere Rovers, before then moving to Wolverhampton Wanderers, Colchester United, Notts County, Newport County, Swansea Town, Aldershot, Alessandria and South Liverpool. Having made his debut for Tranmere's reserves aged 14, Rawcliffe was regarded as a precocious young talent. First Division Wolves paid a fee of £3,000 to take him to Molineux in January 1939, where he played alongside Stan Cullis and Billy Wright. Rawcliffe appeared to have a bright future ahead of him until the onset of war derailed his career. A number of brushes with the law followed before he carved out a career in the lower reaches of the Football League in the post-war years. Rawcliffe enjoyed a degree of success in Italy with Serie B Alessandria, who were being coached by Englishman Bert Flatley. Despite Rawcliffe's goal scoring form, his club were relegated at the end of the 1949/50 season and the forward returned to Merseyside to play for South Liverpool. In December 1950, he returned to Alessandria to help with their Serie C promotion push, but managed just four matches before injury struck and he returned to England for good.

== Name ==
Rawcliffe was born in Cardiff as Frank "Dooley", initially taking on his mother's maiden name before reverting to what is believed to be his father's surname, "Rawcliffe". His mother married George Woodward and the family moved to Wallasey when Frank was a boy. During his time in Italy, Rawcliffe was known as Ratcliffe.
