= Richard Symonds (footballer) =

English footballer (born 1959)

Richard Symonds (born 21 November 1959) is an English former professional footballer. He played 63 times for Norwich City before moving into non-league football.
