= Ken Flint =

English footballer

Personal information
- Full name: Kenneth Flint
- Date of birth: 12 November 1923
- Place of birth: Selston, England
- Date of death: 21 May 2010 (aged 86)
- Place of death: Barnet, England
- Position: Forward

Senior career*
Years	Team	Apps	(Gls)
	Bedford Town	?	(?)
1947–1948	Tottenham Hotspur	5	(1)
1950–1958	Aldershot	324	(70)
1958–1959	Leyton Orient	4	(0)
1959–?	Bath City	?	(?)
- Sittingbourne
- * Club domestic league appearances and goals

Kenneth Flint (12 November 1923 – 21 May 2010) was a professional footballer who played for Bedford Town, Tottenham Hotspur, Aldershot, Leyton Orient and Bath City.

== Playing career ==
Flint joined Tottenham Hotspur from non-League club Bedford Town in 1948. The forward played five matches and scored one goal for the Lilywhites. After leaving White Hart Lane, Flint joined Aldershot where he featured in 324 matches and netting 70 goals between 1950 and 1958. He went on to have a spell at Leyton Orient before moving to Bath City during the 1958–59 season. After that, he played for Sittingbourne.

== Death ==
Flint spent his later years living in Enfield. He died on 21 May 2010, aged 86 at Barnet Hospital.
