= Fred Inskip =

English footballer

Personal information
- Full name: Frederick Clive Inskip
- Date of birth: 20 October 1924
- Place of birth: Cheadle, England
- Date of death: 2000 (aged 75–76)
- Place of death: Stoke-on-Trent, England
- Position: Winger

Senior career*
Years	Team	Apps	(Gls)
	Nottingham Forest	0	(0)
1945	→ Colchester United (guest)	1	(0)
1948–1949	Crewe Alexandra	26	(4)
- Stafford Rangers
Total		27	(4)
- * Club domestic league appearances and goals

Frederick Clive Inskip (24 October 1924 – 2000) was an English professional footballer who played as a winger in the Football League for Crewe Alexandra.

Inskip was on the books at Nottingham Forest during the war years but failed to register an appearance. He signed as a guest for one game for Colchester United in 1945, before joining Crewe Alexandra in 1948, where he made 26 Football League appearances. He later played for Stafford Rangers.

== Career ==
Born in Cheadle, Staffordshire, Inskip began his footballing career with Nottingham Forest but never made a first-team appearance for the club. He joined Southern League side Colchester United for one game as a guest in 1945, playing in their 4–1 Layer Road defeat by Bedford Town on 29 September.

By April 1948, Inskip had made a move to Crewe Alexandra, where he made his Football League debut. He made 26 league appearances for Crewe, scoring four goals. After this, he played for Stafford Rangers.
