= Alf Smirk =

English footballer and manager

Personal information
- Full name: Alfred Henry Smirk
- Date of birth: 14 March 1917
- Place of birth: Penshaw, England
- Date of death: November 1996 (aged 79)
- Place of death: Southend-on-Sea, England
- Position: Inside forward

Senior career*
Years	Team	Apps	(Gls)
- Sheffield Wednesday
- Sunderland Bus Company
1938–1948	Southend United	100	(26)
1945–1946	→ Colchester United (guest)	2	(1)
1948	Gateshead	11	(4)
- Chingford Town
- Tonbridge
- Brush Sports
Total		114	(31)

Managerial career
- Brush Sports (player-manager)
- * Club domestic league appearances and goals

Alfred Henry Smirk (14 March 1917 – November 1996) was an English professional footballer and manager who played as an inside forward in the Football League for Southend United and Gateshead.

Smirk began his footballing career on the books of Sheffield Wednesday, but after failing to break through to the first-team, he moved to play for the Sunderland Bus Company. He was offered a contract in 1938 to play for Southend United, where he made many wartime appearances, before re-signing for the club following the end of hostilities in 1946. During the war years, he made two guest appearances for Colchester United. He made 100 Football League appearances for Southend, before moving to Gateshead for a brief stint in 1948. He returned to Essex with Chingford Town, and later Tonbridge before becoming player-manager at Brush Sports. Later in life, Smirk wrote for the Southend Standard and Southend Times newspapers.

== Career ==
Born in Pershore, Smirk had earned England schoolboy honours in 1931 and was on the books at Sheffield Wednesday by 1935. He never made a first-team appearance for Wednesday, instead moving to Sunderland to play for the Sunderland Bus Company. Upon recommendation to him, Southend United manager David Jack offered Smirk a contract in 1938, and he went on to have a ten-year association with the Essex club. He made many wartime appearances during hostilities, before re-signing professionally in 1946. Until 1948 when he left for Gateshead, Smirk had made 100 Football League appearances for Southend, scoring 26 goals. He also played in twelve FA Cup games, scoring five times, and totalled 32 goals in 114 games.

During the war years, Smirk made two guest appearances for Colchester United while serving with the No. 1 Holding Battalion during their first Southern League season following the end of hostilities. He scored in his first appearance for the club, a 3–1 home win over Bath City on 10 November 1945, and making his next appearance in February 1946.

Smirk left Southend in March 1948 to join Gateshead. He scored four goals in eleven appearances in the latter stages of the 1947–48 season. However, he returned to Essex at the end of his stint back in the north-east to play for Chingford Town. He was later playing for Tonbridge, facing Colchester United in the semi-final of the Southern League Cup in March 1950 where he was placed in goal following an injury to their goalkeeper after 50 minutes of play. He conceded just once in the 3–2 defeat at Layer Road. He also became player-manager at Loughborough-based club Brush Sports.

Following his retirement from playing and management, Smirk wrote for the Southend Standard and the Southend Times newspapers until his death in Southend-on-Sea in November 1996.
