= Bobby Browne (footballer, born 1912) =

Irish footballer

Personal information
- Full name: Robert James Browne
- Date of birth: 9 February 1912
- Place of birth: Derry, Northern Ireland
- Date of death: 1994 (aged 81–82)
- Height: 5 ft 8 in (1.73 m)
- Position: Wing half

Senior career*
Years	Team	Apps	(Gls)
- Maleven
- Clooney Rovers
?–1935	Derry City		
1935–1947	Leeds United	110	(0)
1947–1948	York City	5	(0)
1948?–?	Thorne Colliery		

International career
1935–1938	Ireland (IFA)	6	(0)

Managerial career
- 1948?–?: Thorne Colliery
- 1954: Halifax Town (caretaker manager)
- * Club domestic league appearances and goals

Robert James Browne (9 February 1912 - 1994) was an Irish footballer who played as a wing half. He was one of ten children of Catherine and John, and his youngest brother Leonard was killed when HMS Firedrake was sunk.

Born in Derry, Ireland, Browne began his career with his local team, Derry City FC. There, he won a North-West Senior Cup and represented the Irish League in 1935. However, the Leeds United manager of the 1930s, Billy Hampson, seemed to have a predilection for young Irish talent, and one of the first he brought to Elland Road was Derry-man, Browne. It took a £1,500 fee to prise the talented wing-half from Derry in October 1935, and he went on to make well over a hundred appearances in the Leeds first-team.

Browne was capped six times for Ireland, with all caps coming between 1935 and 1938 whilst he was at Leeds.

When the Football League resumed in 1946, Browne was 34 years old, and he played one more season with Leeds before finishing his League career with York City, although he subsequently joined Thorne Colliery as player-manager. Later, Browne joined the coaching staff at Halifax Town, and was briefly caretaker manager in October and November 1954.
