= Len Reilly =

English footballer

Personal information
- Full name: Leonard Harold Reilly
- Date of birth: 31 January 1917
- Place of birth: Rotherhithe, England
- Date of death: 26 June 1998 (aged 81)
- Place of death: Queensland, Australia
- Height: 5 ft 11 1/2 in (1.82 m)
- Position: Centre half

Senior career*
Years	Team	Apps	(Gls)
1934–1936	Diss Town		
1936–1946	Norwich City	30	(0)
1945	→ Swindon Town (guest)	1	(0)
1946–1947	Chelmsford City	8	(0)
1947–1949	Gorleston		

Managerial career
- 1947–1949: Gorleston
- * Club domestic league appearances and goals

Leonard Harold Reilly (31 January 1917 — 26 June 1998) was an English footballer who played as a centre half.

== Career ==
In February 1936, Reilly signed for Norwich City from Diss Town. Reilly made 30 Football League appearances for the club over the course of ten years, before signing for Chelmsford City. During his time at Norwich, Reilly made one guest appearance for Swindon Town. In 1947, Reilly signed for Gorleston, becoming the club's first official manager in the process.
