= Charlie Thompson (footballer, born 1920) =

English footballer

Charlie Thompson (19 July 1920 – August 1997) was an English footballer. He played in the positions of centre half and centre forward.

Born Charles Maskery Thompson in Chesterfield, he played for Bolsover Colliery and later played for Sheffield United. He made 17 appearances and scored 3 goals in the Football League during the 1946–47 season.

He went on to play for Hereford United in the Southern League and went on to the club's all-time record goalscorer with 184 goals from 452 appearances. This record looks unlikely to be broken for the foreseeable future.

Charles was married to Winifred and they had three children; Roger, Janice and Elaine.

He died in 1997.
