= Jimmy Cargill =

Scottish footballer

Personal information
- Full name: James Cargill
- Date of birth: 21 September 1913
- Place of birth: Arbroath, Scotland
- Date of death: 5 March 1976
- Place of death: Birkenhead, England
- Height: 5 ft 8 in (1.73 m)
- Position: Forward

Senior career*
| Years | Team | Apps | (Gls) |
- Arbroath Roselea
| 193?–1934 | Arbroath Woodside | | |
| 1934 | Arbroath (trial) | 1 | (0) |
| 1934–1936 | Nottingham Forest | 10 | (1) |
| 1936–1939 | Brighton & Hove Albion | 66 | (19) |
| 1939–1940 | Barrow | 0 | (0) |
- * Club domestic league appearances and goals

James Cargill (21 September 1913 – 5 March 1976) was a Scottish professional footballer who played as a forward, either at outside right or inside left, in the English Football League for Nottingham Forest and Brighton & Hove Albion. He also made one appearance in the Scottish League as a trialist for Arbroath.

== Life and career ==
Cargill was born in Arbroath, Scotland. He played junior football for Arbroath Roselea and Arbroath Woodside, and made an appearance for Arbroath in the 1933–34 Division Two season as a trialist, making a good impression in a 4–2 win against Dundee United. Ahead of the 1934–35 season, he went south and signed professional forms with Nottingham Forest of the English Second Division. He made only 10 league appearances in two years before dropping down a division to join Brighton & Hove Albion, for whom he scored 20 goals from 70 appearances in all competitions. He moved on to Barrow, and made his Third Division North debut on 2 September 1939, playing "a capital game" and scoring in a 2–2 draw with Bradford City. War was declared the following day, league football was abandoned for the duration, and his debut goal was removed from the records.
