= Albert Thorpe =

English footballer

Personal information
- Position: Wing half

Senior career*
| Years | Team | Apps | (Gls) |
| 1920–1921 | Plymouth Argyle | 3 | (0) |
| 1921–1922 | Burnley | 0 | (0) |
| Total | | 3 | (0) |
- * Club domestic league appearances and goals

Albert Thorpe was an English professional footballer who played as a wing half. He played three matches in the Football League for Plymouth Argyle in the 1920–21 season. The following season, he moved to Burnley, but did not play any league games for the club.
