= Matt McNeil =

Scottish footballer

Personal information
- Full name: Matthew Alexander McNeil
- Date of birth: 28 July 1927
- Place of birth: Glasgow, Scotland
- Date of death: 23 April 1977 (aged 49)
- Place of death: Newcastle-upon-Tyne, England
- Position: Centre half

Youth career
- Maryhill

Senior career*
Years	Team	Apps	(Gls)
–1949	Hibernian	1	(0)
1949–1951	Newcastle United	9	(0)
1951–1953	Barnsley	68	(1)
1953–1956	Brighton & Hove Albion	53	(0)
1956–1957	Norwich City	44	(2)
- Cambridge United
- * Club domestic league appearances and goals

Matthew Alexander McNeil (28 July 1927 – 23 April 1977) was a Scottish professional footballer who played as a centre half in the Football League for Barnsley, Brighton & Hove Albion, Norwich City and Newcastle United. He also made one appearance in the Scottish League for Hibernian.

== Career statistics ==
Appearances and goals by club, season and competition
Club	Season	League			National Cup		League Cup		Total	
Club	Season	Division	Apps	Goals	Apps	Goals	Apps	Goals	Apps	Goals
Hibernian	1949–50	Scottish First Division	1	0	0	0	7	0	8	0
Newcastle United	1950–51	First Division	9	0	2	0	—		11	0
Career total			10	0	2	0	7	0	19	0
