= Steve Govier =

English footballer

Stephen Govier (born 6 April 1952) is a former professional footballer.

Govier, a centre-back, began his career with Norwich City, for whom he played 30 games (scoring twice) and was a member of the squad that won the second division championship in 1972.

After leaving Carrow Road in 1974 he played for Brighton and Grimsby Town.
