= Bert Holmes =

English association football player

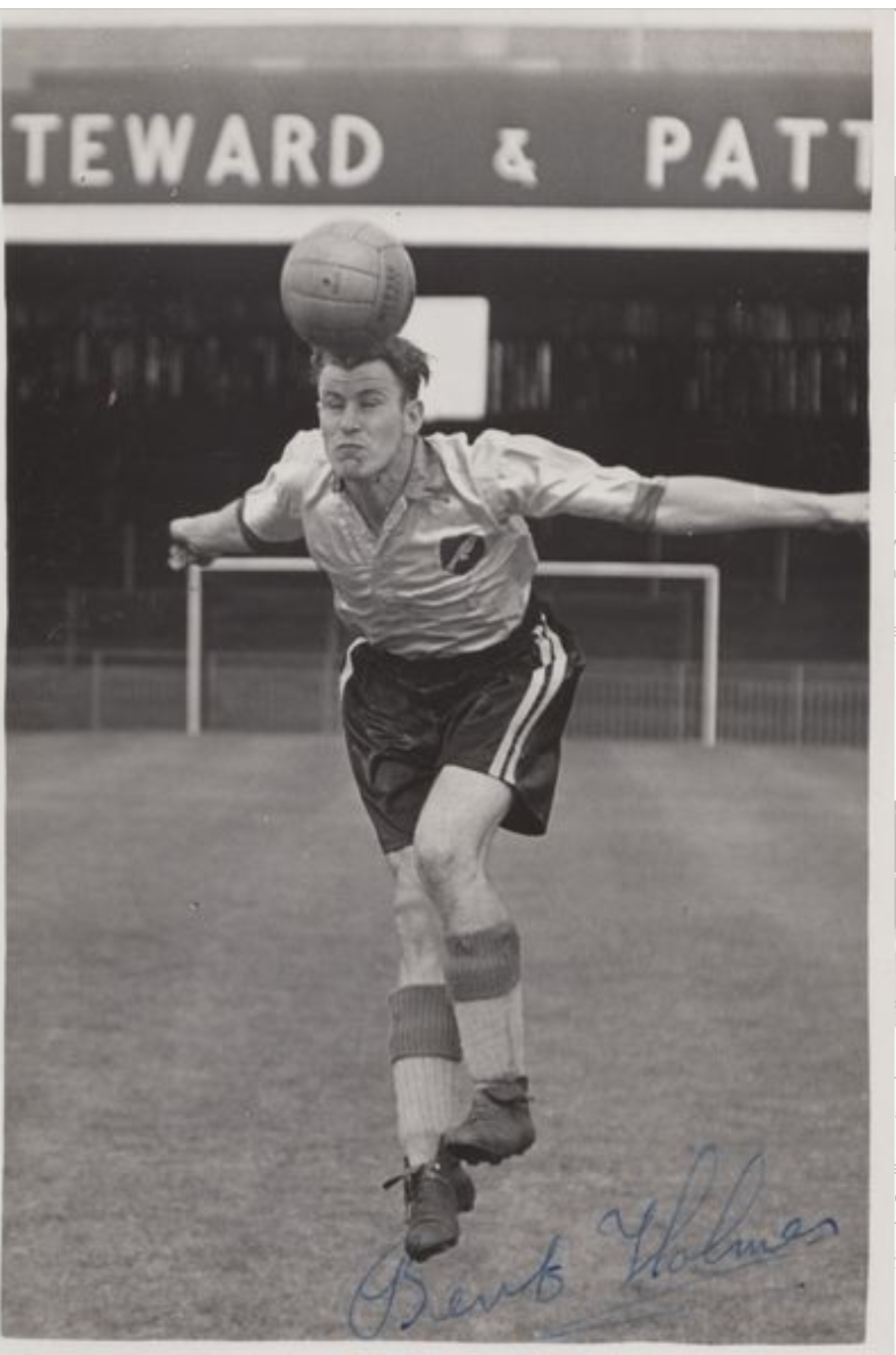

Personal information
- Full name: Bert Herbert Frank Holmes
- Date of birth: 27 September 1924
- Place of birth: Norwich, England
- Date of death: November 2003 (aged 79)
- Place of death: Norwich, England
- Position: Centre-half

Senior career*
| Years | Team | Apps | (Gls) |
- Norman Old Boys
- Gothic
| 1947–1956 | Norwich City | 58 | (1) |
| 1956–1957 | Chelmsford City | 6 | (0) |
- Clacton Town
- * Club domestic league appearances and goals

Bert Herbert Frank Holmes (27 September 1924 — November 2003) was an English footballer who played as a centre half.

== Career ==
Bert Holmes signed for hometown club Norwich City in 1947, following stints playing football for local clubs Norman Old Boys and Gothic. Holmes made 58 Football League appearances, scoring once, during his time at the club in a 4–2 win against Torquay United in 1954.

Holmes later said “My goal came at Torquay in 1954. During the week I was asked to play Centre Forward in the regular 1st team versus Reserves practice match. Billy Furness instructed me to ‘put myself about a bit’. I did exactly that against Foulkes and Lewis, scoring two goals. I was named in the twelve to travel to Torquay. The pitch was deep in mud and the manager, Norman Low, told me I was playing at Number 9. We won 4-2 and I scored from 30 odd yards, although I could easily have cleared the stand with the same shot”

Recalling the times he played for Norwich City at Carrow Road, Holmes said “When you played at Carrow Road, with 30,000 people singing for you, singing ‘On the ball City’, it made you stand tall and always give your best”.

In 1956 Holmes signed for Chelmsford City, where he spent two seasons before moving to Clacton Town.
