= Sid Jones =

English footballer

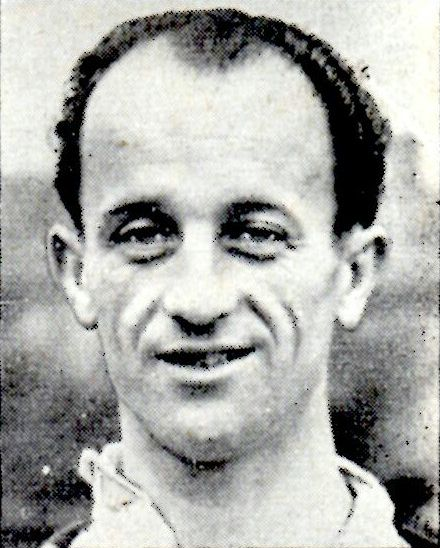

Personal information
- Full name: Sidney Jones
- Date of birth: 15 February 1921
- Place of birth: Rothwell, England
- Date of death: September 1977 (aged 55–56)
- Place of death: Colchester, England
- Position: Full-back

Youth career
- Kippax Juniors

Senior career*
Years	Team	Apps	(Gls)
1939–1948	Arsenal	0	(0)
- Manchester United (guest)
- Doncaster Rovers (guest)
- Brighton & Hove Albion (guest)
- Millwall (guest)
- Bradford City (guest)
- Swansea Town (guest)
- West Bromwich Albion (guest)
- Blackburn Rovers (guest)
- Everton (guest)
- Leeds United (guest)
- Bolton Wanderers (guest)
- Grimsby Town (guest)
- Fulham (guest)
- Middlesbrough (guest)
- Ipswich Town (guest)
1945–1946	Colchester United (guest)	8	(1)
1948–1952	Walsall	146	(1)
- Weymouth
Total		146	(1)
- * Club domestic league appearances and goals

Sidney Jones (15 February 1921 – September 1977) was an English footballer who played in the Football League as a full-back for Walsall. He was also signed to Arsenal, though he failed to make a league appearance for the club.

== Career ==
Born in Rothwell, Jones began his career with local youth club Kippax Juniors. In May 1939, at the age of 18, he was signed to First Division team Arsenal in the Football League, but his career was put on hold with the outbreak of World War II. He would only make one wartime appearance for the Gunners.

During the war, Jones made guest appearances for sixteen different clubs across the country. He began by making a single appearance for Manchester United in 1940–41, then one appearance for Doncaster Rovers in the same season. In 1941–42, he played nine times for Brighton & Hove Albion, scoring once, and played a further eleven games for the club in 1942–43. He played once each for Swansea Town, West Bromwich Albion and Blackburn Rovers. He also played twice for Millwall in the same season, having played seven times for the club in 1941–42. In the 1943–44 season, Jones made seven appearances for Everton and in 1944–45 played once for Bolton Wanderers and Grimsby Town and three times for Fulham. He made his solitary Arsenal appearance in the 1945–46 season, and also played a single game for Middlesbrough and Ipswich Town.

Jones played for local club Leeds United on two occasions during the war years, making three appearances during the 1943–44 season and 11 appearances during the 1945–46 season. He made his debut for the club on 18 September 1943 in a 3–3 draw with Bradford City at Valley Parade.

In December 1945, while stationed at Colchester Garrison with the army, Jones was registered to play for Colchester United. With Colchester in the Southern League at the time, the first season following the war commenced in 1945, as Jones made his debut on 8 December in a 0–0 away draw with Barry Town. Jones scored one league goal for the U's in a 5–1 win over Swindon Town Reserves on 23 February 1946. In total, Jones made eight appearances for Colchester, with his last game coming on 18 April 1946 in a 3–3 draw with Bedford Town.

Having never played a league game for Arsenal, Jones joined Walsall in July 1948, where he went on to make 146 Football League appearances and scored one goal. He made his debut on 21 August 1948, the opening day of the 1948–49 season, in a 2–1 victory over Norwich City at Carrow Road. He was ever-present in the 1950–51 season and left the club at the end of the 1951–52 season to play out the rest of his career with Weymouth.

Sidney Jones died in Colchester in September 1977.
