= Doug Beach =

English footballer (1920-2006)

Personal information
- Full name: Douglas Frederick Beach
- Date of birth: 2 February 1920
- Place of birth: Watford, England
- Date of death: 18 August 2006 (aged 86)
- Place of death: Tavistock, England
- Position: Full back

Youth career
- Sheffield Wednesday

Senior career*
| Years | Team | Apps | (Gls) |
| 1945–1946 | Colchester United | 3 | (2) |
| 1946–1947 | Luton Town | 23 | (0) |
| 1947–1949 | Southend United | 41 | (0) |
| 1949–1950 | Colchester United | 30 | (0) |
- Chelmsford City
- Biggleswade Town
| Total | | 97 | (2) |
- * Club domestic league appearances and goals

Douglas Frederick Beach (2 February 1920 – 18 August 2006) was an English footballer who played as a full back in the Football League. His career began with Sheffield Wednesday as an amateur, joining Colchester United after World War II had ended. He played in the Football League for Luton Town and Southend United, before rejoining Colchester.

== Career ==
Born in Watford, Beach began his career as an amateur with Sheffield Wednesday. He did not make a first-team appearance for Wednesday, joining Southern League side Colchester United in 1945.

Beach made three Southern League appearances for Colchester, scoring twice, before being signed permanently to Football League side Luton Town in 1946. He made 23 league appearances for the Hatters until 1947, when he joined Southend United.

With Southend, Beach made 41 league appearances and played one FA Cup game for the club, scoring no goals. Beach rejoined Essex neighbours Colchester United in 1949, winning the Southern League Cup and finishing as runner-up in the league and gaining election to the Football League for the following season. Beach would not go on to represent Colchester in the Football League, his last appearance coming on 6 May 1950 in a 0–0 draw against Barry Town. He made 30 appearances for the U's in his second stint, teaming up with Chelmsford City and later Biggleswade Town after his Colchester exit.

== Honours ==
Colchester United

- 1949–50 Southern League Cup winner
- 1949–50 Southern League runner-up

All honours referenced by:
