= 1941–42 Brentford F.C. season =

English football team season

Brentford
1941–42 season
- Chairman: Louis P. Simon
- Manager: Harry Curtis
- Stadium: Griffin Park
- London League: 9th
- London War Cup: Winners
- War Cup Winners' Match: Draw
- Top goalscorer: League: Perry (16); All: Perry (20)
- Highest home attendance: 12,000
- Lowest home attendance: 3,000

During the 1941–42 English football season, Brentford competed in the London League, due to the cessation of competitive football for the duration of the Second World War. Despite scoring over 80 goals in what proved to be a forgettable league season, the Bees won the London War Cup with what was the club's only victory at the old Wembley Stadium.

== Season summary ==
With the Second World War in full swing, the Football League's London clubs took a stand against the Football League and its upcoming regional competition for the 1941–42 season, citing the financial difficulties of raising a team during wartime and having to travel long distances to away matches. The rebel clubs broke away and competed in the London League during the 1941–42 season, which led to their expulsion from the Football League. Brentford began the season with a heavily depleted squad, with no goalkeeper available for the entirety of the season and just five of the club's 12 available outfield players made over 30 appearances during the 40-match campaign. Despite 16 goals in 19 appearances and 14 in 24 from returning guest forwards Eddie Perry and Douglas Hunt respectively, Brentford finished 9th of 16 teams in the London League. The team scored 80 goals, but the lack of a first team goalkeeper saw eight guests wear the jersey and concede 76 goals between them.

After finishing as runners-up in the previous season's London War Cup, attentions turned to the 1941–42 edition of the competition when the group stage kicked off on 21 March 1942. Aided by goals from all across the forward line, Brentford finished the group stage as unbeaten leaders. The Bees faced Arsenal in the semi-final at Stamford Bridge and drew 0–0. The two teams met again for the replay White Hart Lane a fortnight later, with goals from George Wilkins, Douglas Hunt and a late penalty save from John Jackson ensuring Brentford's passage through to the final versus Portsmouth. The two clubs faced off at Wembley Stadium on 30 May and a brace from Les Smith saw the Bees run out 2–0 winners, in what was the Bees' only victory at the old Wembley Stadium. The 69,792 crowd is still the largest attendance at any Brentford match. Brentford and Wolverhampton Wanderers met in a North versus South cup winners' charity match a week later, with the 1–1 draw at Stamford Bridge bringing an end to the 1941–42 season.

On the night of 1/2 March 1942, Percy Saunders, a pre-war Brentford player, was killed when his ship was torpedoed in the Indian Ocean. The inside forward had made his final appearance for the club in January 1940 and was serving as a sergeant in the 18th Divisional Workshops of the Royal Army Ordnance Corps. Saunders was the only former Brentford player to be killed in action during the Second World War.

== League tables ==
=== London League ===
Pos	Team	Pld	W	D	L	GF	GA	GR	Pts
8	Charlton Athletic	30	14	5	11	72	64	1.125	33
9	Brentford	30	14	2	14	80	76	1.053	30
10	Queens Park Rangers	30	11	3	16	52	59	0.881	25

Source: Rec.Sport.Soccer Statistics Foundation

=== London War Cup Group 2 ===
Pos	Team	Pld	W	D	L	GF	GA	GR	Pts
1	Brentford	6	4	2	0	17	9	1.889	10
2	Queens Park Rangers	6	2	3	1	15	12	1.250	7
3	Millwall	6	2	1	3	8	7	1.143	5
4	Aldershot	6	1	0	5	8	20	0.400	2

Source: A Record Of British Wartime Football

== Results ==
Brentford's goal tally listed first.

=== Legend ===
Win	Draw	Loss

=== London League ===
No.	Date	Opponent	Venue	Result	Attendance	Scorer(s)
1	30 August 1941	Arsenal	H	4–1	12,000	Hapgood (og), Wilkins, Perry, L. Smith
2	6 September 1941	Queens Park Rangers	A	4–3	8,000	Hunt, Wilkins, Perry
3	13 September 1941	Reading	H	3–2	6,100	Perry (2), Wilkins
4	20 September 1941	Brighton & Hove Albion	A	2–2	5,000	Perry, Hunt
5	27 September 1941	Clapton Orient	A	3–1	3,500	Perry, L. Smith, Hopkins
6	4 October 1941	Crystal Palace	H	1–2	5,000	Perry
7	11 October 1941	Fulham	A	3–4	6,000	Townsend, Smale, Perry
8	18 October 1941	Tottenham Hotspur	H	1–4	6,000	Hunt
9	25 October 1941	Portsmouth	A	1–2	5,000	Hunt
10	1 November 1941	Chelsea	H	3–1	4,650	Perry, James, Hunt
11	8 November 1941	Charlton Athletic	H	2–1	6,320	L. Smith, Hunt
12	15 November 1941	West Ham United	H	0–5	5,000	
13	22 November 1941	Watford	A	6–1	4,000	Hopkins (2), Perry (4)
14	29 November 1941	Aldershot	H	5–1	4,410	Hopkins, Hunt (2), Townsend, Duns
15	6 December 1941	Millwall	A	2–4	2,000	Muttitt, Townsend
16	13 December 1941	Arsenal	A	3–1	9,739	L. Smith, Duns, Perry
17	20 December 1941	Queens Park Rangers	H	4–3	3,500	Townsend (3), Hunt
18	25 December 1941	Reading	A	3–4	n/a	Townsend, Hopkins, L. Smith
19	27 December 1941	Brighton & Hove Albion	H	4–2	5,000	Townsend (2), Tooze (og), L. Smith
20	3 January 1942	Clapton Orient	H	5–2	3,420	Barnes (og), Holliday (2), McKenzie
21	10 January 1942	Crystal Palace	A	0–2	6,000	
22	17 January 1942	Fulham	H	2–3	3,000	L. Smith, Hopkins
23	31 January 1942	Portsmouth	H	2–5	3,820	Wilkins, Holliday
24	7 February 1942	Chelsea	A	1–1	3,135	Wilkins
25	14 February 1942	Charlton Athletic	A	2–3	3,909	Perry, Duncan
26	21 February 1942	West Ham United	A	1–2	4,000	Hunt
27	28 February 1942	Watford	H	5–3	3,110	L. Smith, Hunt (2), Hopkins (2)
28	7 March 1942	Aldershot	A	3–6	3,000	Hopkins, Hunt, McKenzie
29	14 March 1942	Millwall	H	4–3	4,500	Hopkins, L. Smith, Cardwell (og), Hunt
30	25 April 1942	Tottenham Hotspur	A	1–2	6,000	Sneddon

=== London War Cup ===
Round	Date	Opponent	Venue	Result	Attendance	Scorer(s)	Notes
Grp	21 March 1942	Aldershot	H	6–2	5,120	Hunt (2), L. Smith, Perry, Wilkins	
Grp	28 March 1942	Millwall	H	3–3	3,500	Perry, McKenzie (pen)	
Grp	4 April 1942	Queens Park Rangers	A	2–1	3,000	Cheetham, Hunt	
Grp	6 April 1942	Millwall	A	2–2	n/a	Cheetham (2)	
Grp	11 April 1942	Queens Park Rangers	H	1–0	7,310	Perry	
Grp	18 April 1942	Aldershot	A	3–1	4,000	Hopkins, L. Smith, J. Smith	
SF	2 May 1942	Arsenal	N	0–0	41,154		(Note: Match played at Stamford Bridge, London.)
SF (replay)	16 May 1942	Arsenal	N	2–1	40,000	Wilkins, Hunt	(Note: Match played at White Hart Lane, London.)
F	30 May 1942	Portsmouth	N	2–0	69,752	L. Smith (2)	(Note: Match played at Wembley Stadium, London.)

=== War Cup Winners' Match ===
Date	Opponent	Venue	Result	Attendance	Scorer	Notes
6 June 1942	Wolverhampton Wanderers	N	1–1	20,174	Collett	

- Source: 100 Years Of Brentford

== Playing squad ==
Players' ages are as of the opening day of the 1941–42 season.

Pos.	Name	Nat.	Date of birth (age)	Signed from	Signed in	Notes
Defenders
DF	Buster Brown	(England)	6 September 1910 (aged 30)	Huddersfield Town	1937	
DF	George Poyser	(England)	6 February 1910 (aged 31)	Port Vale	1934	
Midfielders
HB	Vic Aicken	(Ireland)	29 October 1914 (aged 26)	Glentoran	1937	Guest for Clapton Orient
HB	Jack Holliday	(England)	19 December 1908 (aged 32)	Middlesbrough	1932	
HB	Joe James	(England)	13 January 1910 (aged 31)	Battersea Church	1929	
HB	Tom Manley	(England)	7 October 1912 (aged 28)	Manchester United	1939	
HB	Ernest Muttitt	(England)	24 July 1908 (aged 33)	Middlesbrough	1932	Guest for Charlton Athletic, Chelsea, Crystal Palace, Fulham, Millwall and Reading
Forwards
FW	Tommy Cheetham	(England)	11 October 1910 (aged 30)	Queens Park Rangers	1939	Guest for Lincoln City and Queens Park Rangers
FW	Idris Hopkins	(Wales)	11 October 1910 (aged 30)	Crystal Palace	1932	
FW	Les Smith	(England)	13 March 1918 (aged 23)	Petersham	1934	
FW	Len Townsend	(England)	31 August 1917 (aged 23)	Hayes	1937	Guest for Chelsea
FW	George Wilkins	(England)	27 October 1919 (aged 21)	Hayes	1939	
Guest players
GK	Sam Bartram	(England)	22 January 1914 (aged 27)	Charlton Athletic	1941	Guest from Charlton Athletic
GK	Harry Brown	(England)	9 April 1924 (aged 17)	Queens Park Rangers	1942	Guest from Queens Park Rangers
GK	David Davison	(England)	n/a	Blackburn Rovers	1941	Guest from Blackburn Rovers
GK	Harry Dukes	(England)	31 March 1912 (aged 29)	Norwich City	1941	Guest from Norwich City
GK	John Jackson	(Scotland)	29 November 1906 (aged 34)	Chelsea	1941	Guest from Chelsea
GK	George Poland	(Wales)	21 September 1913 (aged 27)	Wrexham	1941	Guest from Wrexham
GK	Jock Purdie	(England)	24 May 1918 (aged 23)	Bradford City	1942	Guest from Bradford City
GK	Horace Rickett	(England)	3 January 1912 (aged 29)	Southend United	1942	Guest from Southend United
DF	Doug Anderson	(Scotland)	25 March 1914 (aged 27)	Aberdeen	1941	Guest from Aberdeen
DF	Jimmy Harrison	(England)	12 February 1921 (aged 20)	Leicester City	1941	Guest from Leicester City
HB	Ernie Collett	(England)	17 November 1914 (aged 26)	Arsenal	1942	Guest from Arsenal
HB	Duncan McKenzie	(Scotland)	10 August 1912 (aged 29)	Middlesbrough	1941	Guest from Middlesbrough
HB	Tally Sneddon	(Scotland)	1 April 1914 (aged 27)	Swansea Town	1942	Guest from Swansea Town
HB	Bill Whittaker	(England)	20 December 1922 (aged 18)	Charlton Athletic	1942	Guest from Charlton Athletic
FW	Albert Bonass	(England)	29 May 1911 (aged 30)	Queens Park Rangers	1941	Guest from Queens Park Rangers
FW	Andy Duncan	(Scotland)	25 January 1911 (aged 30)	Tottenham Hotspur	1942	Guest from Tottenham Hotspur
FW	Len Duns	(England)	26 September 1916 (aged 24)	Sunderland	1941	Guest from Sunderland
FW	Douglas Hunt	(England)	19 May 1914 (aged 27)	Sheffield Wednesday	1942	Guest from Sheffield Wednesday
FW	Eric Jones	(England)	15 February 1915 (aged 26)	West Bromwich Albion	1942	Guest from West Bromwich Albion
FW	Tommy Kiernan	(Scotland)	20 October 1918 (aged 22)	Albion Rovers	1942	Guest from Albion Rovers
FW	David McCulloch	(Scotland)	5 October 1912 (aged 28)	Derby County	1941	Guest from Derby County
FW	Tom Peacock	(England)	14 September 1912 (aged 28)	Nottingham Forest	1942	Guest from Nottingham Forest
FW	Eddie Perry	(Wales)	19 January 1909 (aged 32)	Doncaster Rovers	1941	Guest from Doncaster Rovers
FW	Douglas Smale	(England)	27 March 1916 (aged 25)	Chelsea	1941	Guest from Chelsea
FW	John Smith	(England)	1921 (aged 20–21)	Chelsea	1942	Guest from Chelsea
FW	Trevor Smith	(England)	8 September 1910 (aged 29)	Crystal Palace	1941	Guest from Crystal Palace

- Sources: Timeless Bees, Football League Players' Records 1888 to 1939, 100 Years Of Brentford

== Coaching staff ==
Name	Role
(England) Harry Curtis	Manager
(Scotland) Jimmy Bain	Assistant Manager
(England) Bob Kane	Trainer
(England) Jack Cartmell	Assistant Trainer

== Statistics ==
=== Appearances and goals ===

Brentford's highest appearance-makers in each position during the Football League South season.

Pos	Nat	Name	League		L War Cup		Cup Win.		Total	
Pos	Nat	Name	Apps	Goals	Apps	Goals	Apps	Goals	Apps	Goals
DF	(England)	Buster Brown	29	0	9	0	1	0	39	0
DF	(England)	George Poyser	24	0	8	0	1	0	33	0
HB	(Ireland)	Vic Aicken	7	0	—		—		7	0
HB	(England)	Jack Holliday	18	3	—		—		18	3
HB	(England)	Joe James	30	1	7	0	1	0	38	1
HB	(England)	Ernest Muttitt	12	1	1	0	—		13	1
HB	(England)	Tom Manley	—		1	0	—		1	0
FW	(England)	Tommy Cheetham	—		2	3	—		2	3
FW	(Wales)	Idris Hopkins	28	11	9	1	1	0	38	12
FW	(England)	Les Smith	20	9	9	4	1	0	30	13
FW	(England)	Len Townsend	13	9	—		—		13	9
FW	(England)	George Wilkins	17	5	7	3	1	0	25	8
Players guested during the season
GK	(England)	Harry Brown	1	0	1	0	—		2	0
GK	(England)	David Davison	1	0	—		—		1	0
GK	(England)	Harry Dukes	1	0	—		—		1	0
GK	(Scotland)	John Jackson	8	0	3	0	1	0	12	0
GK	(Wales)	George Poland	14	0	5	0	—		19	0
GK	(England)	Jock Purdie	2	0	—		—		2	0
GK	(England)	Horace Rickett	2	0	—		—		2	0
GK	(England)	Sam Bartram	1	0	—		—		1	0
DF	(Scotland)	Doug Anderson	5	0	—		—		5	0
DF	(England)	Jimmy Harrison	2	0	—		—		2	0
HB	(England)	Ernie Collett	—		—		1	1	1	1
HB	(Scotland)	Duncan McKenzie	26	2	9	1	1	0	36	3
HB	(Scotland)	Tally Sneddon	8	1	8	0	—		16	1
HB	(England)	Bill Whittaker	—		2	0	—		2	0
FW	(England)	Albert Bonass	1	0	—		—		1	0
FW	(Scotland)	Andy Duncan	1	1	—		—		1	1
FW	(England)	Len Duns	5	2	2	0	—		7	2
FW	(England)	Douglas Hunt	24	14	8	4	1	0	33	18
FW	(England)	Eric Jones	4	0	—		—		4	0
FW	(Scotland)	Tommy Kiernan	1	0	—		—		1	0
FW	(Scotland)	David McCulloch	1	0	—		—		1	0
FW	(England)	Tom Peacock	1	0	—		—		1	0
FW	(Wales)	Eddie Perry	19	16	7	4	1	0	27	20
FW	(England)	Douglas Smale	3	1	—		—		3	1
FW	(England)	John Smith	—		1	1	—		1	1
FW	(England)	Trevor Smith	1	0	—		—		1	0

- Players listed in italics left the club mid-season.
- Source: 100 Years Of Brentford

=== Goalscorers ===
Pos.	Nat	Player	LFL	LWC	CWM	Total
FW	(Wales)	Eddie Perry	16	4	0	20
FW	(England)	Douglas Hunt	14	4	0	18
FW	(England)	Les Smith	9	4	0	13
FW	(Wales)	Idris Hopkins	11	1	0	12
FW	(England)	Len Townsend	9	—	—	9
FW	(England)	George Wilkins	5	3	0	8
HB	(England)	Jack Holliday	3	—	—	3
HB	(Scotland)	Duncan McKenzie	2	1	0	3
FW	(England)	Tommy Cheetham	—	3	—	3
FW	(England)	Len Duns	2	0	—	2
FW	(Scotland)	Andy Duncan	1	—	—	1
FW	(England)	Douglas Smale	1	—	—	1
HB	(England)	Joe James	1	0	—	1
FW	(England)	Ernest Muttitt	1	0	—	1
HB	(Scotland)	Tally Sneddon	1	0	—	1
HB	(England)	Ernie Collett	—	—	1	1
FW	(England)	John Smith	—	1	—	1
Opponents			4	0	0	4
Total			80	21	1	102

- Players listed in italics left the club mid-season.
- Source: 100 Years Of Brentford

=== Wartime international caps ===
Pos.	Nat	Player	Caps	Goals	Ref
FW	(Wales)	Idris Hopkins	2	1	
FW	(England)	Les Smith	1	0	

=== Management ===
Name	Nat	From	To	Record All Comps					Record League				
Name	Nat	From	To	P	W	D	L	W %	P	W	D	L	W %
Harry Curtis	(England)	30 August 1941	6 June 1942	40	20	6	14	50.00|	30	14	2	14	46.67

=== Summary ===
Games played	40 (30 London League, 9 London War Cup, 1 War Cup Winners' Match)
Games won	20 (14 London League, 6 London War Cup, 0 War Cup Winners' Match)
Games drawn	6 (2 London League, 3 London War Cup, 1 War Cup Winners' Match)
Games lost	14 (14 London League, 0 London War Cup, 0 War Cup Winners' Match)
Goals scored	102 (80 London League, 21 London War Cup, 1 War Cup Winners' Match)
Goals conceded	87 (76 London League, 10 London War Cup, 1 War Cup Winners' Match)
Clean sheets	3 (0 London League, 3 London War Cup, 0 War Cup Winners' Match)
Biggest league win	6–1 versus Watford, 22 November 1941
Worst league defeat	5–0 versus West Ham United, 15 November 1941
Most appearances	40, Buster Brown (29 London League, 9 London War Cup, 1 War Cup Winners' Match)
Top scorer (league)	16, Eddie Perry
Top scorer (all competitions)	20, Eddie Perry

== Transfers & loans ==
Guest players' arrival and departure dates correspond to their first and last appearances of the season.

Guest players in
Date from	Pos.	Name	Previous club	Date to	Ref.
30 August 1941	FW	(England) Douglas Hunt	(England) Sheffield Wednesday	End of season	
30 August 1941	GK	(Scotland) John Jackson	(England) Chelsea	End of season	
30 August 1941	HB	(Scotland) Duncan McKenzie	(England) Middlesbrough	End of season	
30 August 1941	FW	(Wales) Eddie Perry	(England) Doncaster Rovers	End of season	
6 September 1941	FW	(England) Eric Jones	(England) West Bromwich Albion	18 October 1941	
11 October 1941	FW	(England) Douglas Smale	(England) Chelsea	3 January 1942	
25 October 1941	GK	(England) Sam Bartram	(England) Charlton Athletic	25 October 1941	
25 October 1941	FW	(England) Albert Bonass	(England) Queens Park Rangers	25 October 1941	
25 October 1941	FW	(England) Trevor Smith	(England) Crystal Palace	25 October 1941	
1 November 1941	GK	(Wales) George Poland	(Wales) Wrexham	25 April 1942	
8 November 1941	FW	(Scotland) David McCulloch	(England) Derby County	8 November 1941	
15 November 1941	GK	(England) Harry Dukes	(England) Norwich City	15 November 1941	
29 November 1941	DF	(Scotland) Doug Anderson	(Scotland) Aberdeen	31 January 1942	
29 November 1941	FW	(England) Len Duns	(England) Sunderland	18 April 1942	
6 December 1941	GK	(England) David Davison	(England) Blackburn Rovers	6 December 1941	
27 December 1941	DF	(England) Jimmy Harrison	(England) Leicester City	10 January 1942	
27 December 1941	GK	(England) Horace Rickett	(England) Southend United	10 January 1942	
17 January 1942	HB	(Scotland) Tally Sneddon	(Wales) Swansea Town	30 May 1942	
7 February 1942	GK	(England) Jock Purdie	(England) Bradford City	28 February 1942	
14 February 1942	FW	(Scotland) Andy Duncan	(England) Tottenham Hotspur	14 February 1942	
7 March 1942	FW	(England) Tom Peacock	(England) Nottingham Forest	7 March 1942	
14 March 1942	GK	(England) Harry Brown	(England) Queens Park Rangers	21 March 1942	
11 April 1942	HB	(England) Bill Whittaker	(England) Charlton Athletic	18 April 1942	
18 April 1942	FW	(England) John Smith	(England) Chelsea	18 April 1942	
25 April 1942	FW	(Scotland) Tommy Kiernan	(Scotland) Albion Rovers	25 April 1942	
6 June 1942	HB	(England) Ernie Collett	(England) Arsenal	End of season	
Guest players out
Date from	Pos.	Name	To	Date to	Ref.
30 August 1941	GK	(Scotland) Joe Crozier	(Scotland) Hibernian	4 July 1942	
22 November 1941	FW	(England) Tommy Cheetham	(England) Lincoln City	n/a	
14 February 1942	FW	(England) Len Townsend	(England) Chelsea	6 April 1942	
9 May 1942	FW	(England) Tommy Cheetham	(England) Queens Park Rangers	9 May 1942	
n/a	HB	(Ireland) Vic Aicken	(England) Clapton Orient	n/a	
n/a	HB	(England) Ernest Muttitt	(England) Charlton Athletic	n/a	
n/a	HB	(England) Ernest Muttitt	(England) Chelsea	n/a	
n/a	HB	(England) Ernest Muttitt	(England) Crystal Palace	n/a	
n/a	HB	(England) Ernest Muttitt	(England) Fulham	n/a	
n/a	HB	(England) Ernest Muttitt	(England) Millwall	n/a	
n/a	HB	(England) Ernest Muttitt	(England) Reading	n/a	
Players released
Date	Pos.	Name	Subsequent club	Join date	Ref.
2 March 1942	FW	(England) Percy Saunders	Killed in action		
