= 1940–41 Brentford F.C. season =

English football team season

Brentford
1940–41 season
- Chairman: Louis P. Simon
- Manager: Harry Curtis
- Stadium: Griffin Park
- Football League South: 20th
- Football League War Cup: Second round
- London War Cup: Runners-up
- Top goalscorer: League: Hopkins (10); All: Perry (21)
- Highest home attendance: 5,000
- Lowest home attendance: 400

During the 1940–41 English football season, Brentford competed in the Football League South, due to the cessation of competitive football for the duration of the Second World War. Though the Bees finished well down in the league placings, the club enjoyed some measure of success in the London War Cup, finishing as runners-up to Reading.

== Season summary ==
In Brentford's first full season of wartime football during the Second World War, low crowds and takings of just £30–40 per match during the first half of the Football League South season brought about fears that the club would be unable to fulfil the remaining fixtures of the season. Manager Harry Curtis, backed by his directors, elected to carry on and welcome respite was found in the new London War Cup, in which the Bees advanced to the final, largely helped by 8 goals in five matches from guest forward Eddie Perry. Despite a further two goals for Perry in the final, Brentford finished as runners-up to Reading, losing 3–2 at Stamford Bridge.

== League tables ==
=== Football League South ===
Pos	Team	Pld	W	D	L	GF	GA	GR
19	Aldershot	24	14	2	8	73	68	1.074
20	Brentford	23	9	3	11	51	51	1.000
21	Chelsea	23	10	4	9	57	58	0.983

Source: Rec.Sport.Soccer Statistics Foundation

=== London War Cup Group A ===
Pos	Team	Pld	W	D	L	GF	GA	GR	Pts
1	Brentford	10	4	5	1	25	20	1.250	13
2	Crystal Palace	10	4	4	2	25	18	1.389	12
3	Queens Park Rangers	10	5	1	4	26	26	1.000	11
4	Aldershot	10	4	2	4	21	24	0.875	10
5	Fulham	9	4	0	5	32	34	0.941	8
6	Chelsea	10	2	2	6	19	26	0.731	6

Source: 100 Years Of Brentford

== Results ==
Brentford's goal tally listed first.

=== Legend ===
Win	Draw	Loss

=== Football League South ===
No.	Date	Opponent	Venue	Result	Attendance	Scorer(s)	Notes
1	31 August 1940	Clapton Orient	H	2–2	1,123	Wilkins, McKenzie (pen)	
2	7 September 1940	Chelsea	A	1–2	3,500	Wilkins	(Note: Match abandoned after 70 minutes due to an air raid.)
3	14 September 1940	Charlton Athletic	H	1–1	600	McKenzie (pen)	
4	21 September 1940	Arsenal	A	1–3	1,700	Hunt	
5	5 October 1940	Clapton Orient	A	0–1	500		
6	12 October 1940	Charlton Athletic	A	4–1	800	Hunt (2), Townsend (2)	(Note: Match abandoned after 55 minutes due to an air raid.)
7	19 October 1940	Fulham	H	8–3	1,300	Hunt (3), Hopkins, McKenzie (pen), Townsend (2), Muttitt	
8	26 October 1940	Arsenal	H	3–3	1,200	Townsend (2), Muttitt	
9	2 November 1940	Portsmouth	H	3–1	500	Ferris, Cheetham, Hopkins	
10	16 November 1940	West Ham United	H	0–2	400		
11	23 November 1940	Fulham	A	0–3	600		
12	7 December 1940	Reading	H	2–3	600	Hopkins, McKenzie (pen)	
13	14 December 1940	Millwall	A	0–3	1,250		
14	21 December 1940	Portsmouth	A	3–2	1,814	Holliday (2), Wilkins	
15	25 December 1940	Queens Park Rangers	H	2–1	3,725	Wilkins, Hunt	
16	28 December 1940	Millwall	H	3–2	1,759	Hunt, Boulter	
17	15 March 1941	Crystal Palace	H	2–3	4,000	Perry, Hopkins	
18	22 March 1941	Crystal Palace	A	0–5	2,638		
19	19 April 1941	Millwall	H	5–2	2,500	Perry, Hopkins, Townsend	
20	3 May 1941	West Ham United	A	2–3	3,000	Hopkins (2)	
21	10 May 1941	Fulham	H	2–3	2,670	Bamford, Holliday	
22	17 May 1941	Reading	A	4–1	5,000	Perry (3), Holliday	
23	24 May 1941	Reading	H	3–1	1,520	Hopkins (3)	

=== Football League War Cup ===
Round	Date	Opponent	Venue	Result	Attendance	Scorer(s)	Notes
1R (1st leg)	15 February 1941	Southampton	A	2–2	1,815	Hunt, Wilkins	(Note: Match played at Fratton Park, Portsmouth due to bomb damage at The Dell, Southampton.)
1R (2nd leg)	22 February 1941	Southampton	H	5–2	n/a	James, L. Smith, Perry (3)	
2R (1st leg)	1 March 1941	Chelsea	H	2–2	4,520	Hunt, Hopkins	
2R (2nd leg)	8 March 1941	Chelsea	A	1–3 (lost 5–3 on aggregate)	5,992	Perry	

=== London War Cup ===
Round	Date	Opponent	Venue	Result	Attendance	Scorer(s)	Notes
Grp	4 January 1941	Crystal Palace	H	2–2	1,000	Muttitt, Boulter	
Grp	11 January 1941	Crystal Palace	A	2–2	2,841	Muttitt, L. Smith	
Grp	25 January 1941	Chelsea	A	1–0	1,318	Davie	
Grp	1 February 1941	Fulham	A	1–4	2,500	L. Smith	
Grp	8 February 1941	Fulham	H	7–4	2,428	Hunt, Hopkins (3), Perry (2), McKenzie	
Grp	29 March 1941	Chelsea	H	2–2	1,654	L. Smith, Townsend	
Grp	5 April 1941	Aldershot	H	4–2	1,960	Perry (2), Hopkins (2)	
Grp	12 April 1941	Aldershot	A	2–2	4,000	Wilkins, Perry	
Grp	14 April 1941	Queens Park Rangers	H	4–2	5,000	Hopkins, Perry (2), L. Smith	
Grp	26 April 1941	Queens Park Rangers	A	0–0	6,000		
SF	31 May 1941	Tottenham Hotspur	A	2–0	6,405	Perry, Townsend	
F	7 June 1941	Reading	N	2–3	9,000	Perry (2)	(Note: Match played at Stamford Bridge, London.)

- Sources: 100 Years Of Brentford

== Playing squad ==
Players' ages are as of the opening day of the 1940–41 season.

Pos.	Name	Nat.	Date of birth (age)	Signed from	Signed in	Notes
Goalkeepers
GK	Ted Gaskell	(England)	19 December 1916 (aged 23)	Buxton	1937	
Defenders						
DF	Buster Brown	(England)	6 September 1910 (aged 29)	Huddersfield Town	1937	
DF	Frank Gibson	(England)	January 1920 (aged 20)	Youth	1939	
DF	George Poyser	(England)	6 February 1910 (aged 30)	Port Vale	1934	
Midfielders
HB	Vic Aicken	(Ireland)	29 October 1914 (aged 25)	Glentoran	1937	
HB	Jack Holliday	(England)	19 December 1908 (aged 31)	Middlesbrough	1932	
HB	Joe James	(England)	13 January 1910 (aged 30)	Battersea Church	1929	
HB	Billy Scott	(England)	6 December 1907 (aged 32)	Middlesbrough	1932	
Forwards
FW	Harry Bamford	(England)	8 April 1914 (aged 26)	Hayes	1936	
FW	Sidney Beasley	(England)	May 1920 (aged 20)	Youth	1939	
FW	Les Boulter	(Wales)	31 August 1913 (aged 27)	Charlton Athletic	1939	
FW	Cyril Brown	(England)	25 May 1918 (aged 22)	Felixstowe	1939	
FW	Tommy Cheetham	(England)	11 October 1910 (aged 29)	Queens Park Rangers	1939	
FW	Stan Cousins	(England)	August 1922 (aged 17–18)	Youth	1939	Guest for Clapton Orient
FW	Idris Hopkins	(Wales)	11 October 1910 (aged 29)	Crystal Palace	1932	
FW	Ernest Muttitt	(England)	24 July 1908 (aged 32)	Middlesbrough	1932	Guest for Clapton Orient and Fulham
FW	Les Smith	(England)	13 March 1918 (aged 22)	Petersham	1934	
FW	Bob Thomas	(England)	2 August 1919 (aged 21)	Golders Green	1939	
FW	Len Townsend	(England)	31 August 1917 (aged 23)	Hayes	1937	Guest for Belfast Celtic and Leeds United
FW	George Wilkins	(England)	27 October 1919 (aged 20)	Hayes	1939	
Guest players
GK	George Duke	(England)	6 September 1920 (aged 19)	Luton Town	1940	Guest from Luton Town
GK	John Jackson	(Scotland)	29 November 1906 (aged 33)	Chelsea	1940	Guest from Chelsea
GK	George Poland	(Wales)	21 September 1913 (aged 26)	Wrexham	1941	Guest from Wrexham
DF	Harold Shepherdson	(England)	22 October 1918 (aged 21)	Middlesbrough	1940	Guest from Middlesbrough
HB	Duncan McKenzie	(Scotland)	10 August 1912 (aged 28)	Middlesbrough	1940	Guest from Middlesbrough
FW	Pat Beasley	(England)	16 July 1913 (aged 27)	Huddersfield Town	1941	Guest from Huddersfield Town
FW	Jock Davie	(Scotland)	13 February 1913 (aged 27)	Brighton & Hove Albion	1940	Guest from Brighton & Hove Albion
FW	George Eastham	(England)	13 August 1914 (aged 26)	Blackpool	1941	Guest from Blackpool
FW	Ray Ferris	(Ireland)	22 September 1920 (aged 19)	Linfield	1940	Amateur, guest from Linfield
FW	Jackie Gibbons	(England)	10 April 1914 (aged 26)	Tottenham Hotspur	1941	Amateur, guest from Tottenham Hotspur
FW	Eric Houghton	(England)	29 June 1910 (aged 30)	Aston Villa	1941	Guest from Aston Villa
FW	Douglas Hunt	(England)	19 May 1914 (aged 26)	Sheffield Wednesday	1940	Guest from Sheffield Wednesday
FW	George Mills	(England)	29 December 1908 (aged 31)	Chelsea	1941	Guest from Chelsea
FW	Eddie Perry	(Wales)	19 January 1909 (aged 31)	Doncaster Rovers	1941	Guest from Doncaster Rovers
FW	Trevor Smith	(England)	8 September 1910 (aged 29)	Crystal Palace	1941	Guest from Crystal Palace
FW	Billy Wrigglesworth	(England)	12 November 1912 (aged 27)	Manchester United	1940	Guest from Manchester United

- Sources: Timeless Bees, Football League Players' Records 1888 to 1939, 100 Years Of Brentford

== Coaching staff ==
Name	Role
(England) Harry Curtis	Manager
(Scotland) Jimmy Bain	Assistant Manager
(England) Bob Kane	Trainer
(England) Jack Cartmell	Assistant Trainer

== Statistics ==
=== Appearances and goals ===

Brentford's highest appearance-makers in each position during the Football League South season.

Pos	Nat	Name	League		FL War Cup		Lo War Cup		Total	
Pos	Nat	Name	Apps	Goals	Apps	Goals	Apps	Goals	Apps	Goals
GK	(England)	Ted Gaskell	1	0	—		—		1	0
DF	(England)	Buster Brown	18	0	4	0	12	0	34	0
DF	(England)	Frank Gibson	1	0	—		—		1	0
DF	(England)	George Poyser	19	0	4	0	12	0	35	0
HB	(Ireland)	Vic Aicken	5	0	1	0	—		6	0
HB	(England)	Jack Holliday	19	4	4	0	12	0	35	4
HB	(England)	Joe James	23	0	4	1	12	0	39	0
HB	(England)	Billy Scott	2	0	—		—		2	0
FW	(England)	Harry Bamford	1	1	—		2	0	3	1
FW	(England)	Sidney Beasley	2	0	—		—		2	0
FW	(Wales)	Les Boulter	2	1	—		1	1	3	2
FW	(England)	Cyril Brown	1	0	—		—		1	0
FW	(England)	Tommy Cheetham	1	1	—		—		1	1
FW	(England)	Stan Cousins	—		1	0	—		1	0
FW	(Wales)	Idris Hopkins	23	10	4	1	11	6	38	17
FW	(England)	Ernest Muttitt	11	2	4	0	3	2	18	4
FW	(England)	Les Smith	19	0	3	1	10	4	32	5
FW	(England)	Bob Thomas	—		1	0	—		1	0
FW	(England)	Len Townsend	11	7	—		4	2	15	9
FW	(England)	George Wilkins	15	4	1	1	12	1	28	6
Players guested during the season
GK	(England)	George Duke	18	0	4	0	5	0	27	0
GK	(Scotland)	John Jackson	2	0	—		2	0	4	0
GK	(Wales)	George Poland	5	0	—		2	0	7	0
DF	(England)	Harold Shepherdson	2	0	—		—		2	0
HB	(Scotland)	Duncan McKenzie	23	4	—		12	1	35	5
FW	(England)	Pat Beasley	—		—		1	0	1	0
FW	(Scotland)	Jock Davie	2	0	—		2	1	4	1
FW	(England)	George Eastham	2	0	—		—		2	0
FW	(Ireland)	Ray Ferris	1	1	—		—		1	1
FW	(England)	Jackie Gibbons	1	0	—		—		1	0
FW	(England)	Eric Houghton	1	0	—		—		1	0
FW	(England)	Douglas Hunt	16	9	4	2	7	1	27	12
FW	(England)	George Mills	—		1	0	—		1	0
FW	(Wales)	Eddie Perry	7	7	4	4	6	10	17	21
FW	(England)	Trevor Smith	—		—		1	0	1	0
FW	(England)	Billy Wrigglesworth	2	0	—		—		2	0

- Players listed in italics left the club mid-season.
- Source: 100 Years Of Brentford

=== Goalscorers ===
Pos.	Nat	Player	FLS	FLC	LWC	Total
FW	(Wales)	Eddie Perry	7	4	10	21
FW	(Wales)	Idris Hopkins	10	1	6	17
FW	(England)	Douglas Hunt	9	2	1	12
FW	(England)	Len Townsend	7	—	2	9
FW	(England)	George Wilkins	4	1	1	6
HB	(Scotland)	Duncan McKenzie	4	—	1	5
FW	(England)	Les Smith	0	1	4	5
HB	(England)	Jack Holliday	4	0	0	4
FW	(England)	Ernest Muttitt	2	0	2	4
FW	(Wales)	Les Boulter	1	—	1	2
FW	(England)	Tommy Cheetham	1	—	—	1
FW	(Ireland)	Ray Ferris	1	—	—	1
FW	(England)	Harry Bamford	1	—	0	1
FW	(Scotland)	Jock Davie	0	—	1	1
Total			51	10	29	90

- Players listed in italics left the club mid-season.
- Source: 100 Years Of Brentford

=== Wartime international caps ===
Pos.	Nat	Player	Caps	Goals	Ref
FW	(Wales)	Idris Hopkins	1	0	

=== Management ===
Name	Nat	From	To	Record All Comps					Record League				
Name	Nat	From	To	P	W	D	L	W %	P	W	D	L	W %
Harry Curtis	(England)	31 August 1940	7 June 1941	39	15	10	14	38.46|	23	9	3	11	39.13

=== Summary ===
Games played	39 (23 Football League South, 4 Football League War Cup, 12 London War Cup)
Games won	15 (9 Football League South, 1 Football League War Cup, 5 London War Cup)
Games drawn	10 (3 Football League South, 2 Football League War Cup, 5 London War Cup)
Games lost	14 (11 Football League South, 1 Football League War Cup, 2 London War Cup)
Goals scored	90 (51 Football League South, 10 Football League War Cup, 29 London War Cup)
Goals conceded	83 (51 Football League South, 9 Football League War Cup, 23 London War Cup)
Clean sheets	3 (0 Football League South, 0 Football League War Cup, 3 London War Cup)
Biggest league win	8–3 versus Fulham, 19 October 1940
Worst league defeat	5–0 versus Crystal Palace, 22 March 1941
Most appearances	39, Joe James (23 Football League South, 4 Football League War Cup, 12 London War Cup)
Top scorer (league)	10, Idris Hopkins
Top scorer (all competitions)	21, Eddie Perry

== Transfers & loans ==
Guest players' arrival and departure dates correspond to their first and last appearances of the season.

Guest players in
Date from	Pos.	Name	Previous club	Date to	Ref.
31 August 1940	GK	(England) George Duke	(England) Luton Town	3 May 1941	
31 August 1940	HB	(Scotland) Duncan McKenzie	(England) Middlesbrough	End of season	
31 August 1940	DF	(England) Harold Shepherdson	(England) Middlesbrough	7 September 1940	
7 September 1940	FW	(England) Douglas Hunt	(England) Sheffield Wednesday	3 May 1941	
7 September 1940	FW	(England) Billy Wrigglesworth	(England) Manchester United	14 September 1940	
14 September 1940	GK	(Scotland) John Jackson	(England) Chelsea	26 April 1941	
2 November 1940	FW	(Ireland) Ray Ferris	(Ireland) Linfield	2 November 1940	
16 November 1940	FW	(Scotland) Jock Davie	(England) Brighton & Hove Albion	1 February 1941	
8 February 1941	FW	(Wales) Eddie Perry	(England) Doncaster Rovers	End of season	
15 March 1941	FW	(England) George Eastham	(England) Blackpool	22 March 1941	
5 April 1941	GK	(Wales) George Poland	(Wales) Wrexham	End of season	
26 April 1941	FW	(England) Pat Beasley	(England) Huddersfield Town	26 April 1941	
26 April 1941	FW	(England) Trevor Smith	(England) Crystal Palace	26 April 1941	
3 May 1941	FW	(England) Eric Houghton	(England) Aston Villa	3 May 1941	
17 May 1941	FW	(England) Jackie Gibbons	(England) Tottenham Hotspur	17 May 1941	
Guest players out
Date from	Pos.	Name	To	Date to	Ref.
7 August 1940	GK	(Scotland) Joe Crozier	(Scotland) Airdrieonians	End of season	
9 November 1940	FW	(England) Len Townsend	(England) Leeds United	22 March 1941	
n/a	HB	(England) Stan Cousins	(England) Clapton Orient	n/a	
n/a	FW	(England) Ernest Muttitt	(England) Clapton Orient	n/a	
n/a	FW	(England) Ernest Muttitt	(England) Fulham	n/a	
n/a	FW	(England) Len Townsend	(Ireland) Belfast Celtic	n/a	
Players released
Date	Pos.	Name	Subsequent club	Join date	Ref.
25 October 1940	DF	(Scotland) Doug Anderson	(Scotland) Falkirk	25 October 1940	
