= 1939–40 Brentford F.C. season =

English football team season

Brentford
1939–40 season
- Chairman: Louis P. Simon
- Manager: Harry Curtis
- Stadium: Griffin Park
- First Division: 12th (abandoned)
- Top goalscorer: League: Holliday (17); All: Holliday (17)
- Highest home attendance: 12,079
- Average home league attendance: 12,079
Home colours

During the 1939–40 English football season, Brentford competed in the Football League, playing three matches before competitive football was suspended due to the outbreak of the Second World War. The club played in three unofficial wartime competitions for the remainder of the season – groups B and C of the Football League South and the Football League War Cup.

== Season summary ==
After narrowly avoiding relegation towards the end of the 1938–39 season, Brentford manager Harry Curtis allowed full back Joe Wilson and half backs Sam Briddon and Tally Sneddon to transfer away from the club. Curtis signed young Sunderland inside forward Percy Saunders and brought in former Manchester United wing half Tom Mansley as his new captain. The season opened with a heavy 5–1 Football League Jubilee Fund defeat to neighbours Chelsea on 19 August 1939. Brentford began the regular season with a win, a draw and a defeat, before competitive football was suspended following Britain's declaration of war on Germany on 3 September 1939. Percy Saunders, who had scored on his debut on the opening day, would be the only pre-war Brentford player to die on active service during the war, when his ship was torpedoed in the Indian Ocean in March 1942.

The cessation of competitive football was worrying for Brentford, with £12,000 having been spent on new players during the off-season (equivalent to £678,200 in 2025) and there was little prospect of recouping it through the turnstiles. 23 of Brentford's 30-man squad were called to arms, into the War Police Reserve or into the munitions industry. Within two weeks of the declaration of war, the Football League agreed that football could continue, in order to keep clubs in business and to raise funds.

Brentford entered Group B of the new Football League South in October 1939. The squad was augmented by three guest players who had previously played for the club – Scottish half backs Duncan McKenzie and Archie Scott and inside forward Bert Stephens. 30-year old centre forward Jack Holliday (a prolific goalscorer in the Third and Second Divisions between 1932 and 1935) experienced a renaissance, with 14 goals in 16 appearances. Brentford finished the Group B campaign in mid-table.

A further 18-match campaign followed in Group C in the first six months of 1940, with 13 players guesting, including two former international Brentford players – Scotland's David McCulloch and the United States' Jim Brown. The Bees finished 4th in the 10-team group and exited the Football League War Cup in the first round.

== League tables ==
=== Football League First Division ===
| Pos | Team | Pld | W | D | L | GF | GA | GAv | Pts |
|---|---|---|---|---|---|---|---|---|---|
| 9 | Stoke City | 3 | 1 | 1 | 1 | 7 | 4 | 1.750 | 3 |
| 10 | Manchester United | 3 | 1 | 1 | 1 | 5 | 3 | 1.667 | 3 |
| 11 | Brentford | 3 | 1 | 1 | 1 | 3 | 3 | 1.000 | 3 |
| 12 | Chelsea | 3 | 1 | 1 | 1 | 4 | 4 | 1.000 | 3 |
| 13 | Grimsby Town | 3 | 1 | 1 | 1 | 2 | 4 | 0.500 | 3 |

Rules for classification: 1) Points; 2) Goal average; 3) Goals scored

=== Football League South Group B ===
| Pos | Team | Pld | W | D | L | GF | GA | GR | Pts |
|---|---|---|---|---|---|---|---|---|---|
| 1 | Queens Park Rangers | 18 | 12 | 2 | 4 | 49 | 26 | 1.885 | 26 |
| 2 | Bournemouth & Boscombe Athletic | 18 | 11 | 2 | 5 | 52 | 37 | 1.405 | 24 |
| 3 | Chelsea | 18 | 9 | 5 | 4 | 44 | 37 | 1.189 | 23 |
| 4 | Reading | 18 | 10 | 2 | 6 | 47 | 42 | 1.119 | 22 |
| 5 | Brentford | 18 | 8 | 2 | 8 | 42 | 41 | 1.024 | 18 |
| 6 | Fulham | 18 | 7 | 4 | 7 | 50 | 51 | 0.980 | 18 |
| 7 | Portsmouth | 18 | 7 | 2 | 9 | 37 | 42 | 0.881 | 16 |
| 8 | Aldershot | 18 | 5 | 4 | 9 | 38 | 49 | 0.776 | 14 |
| 9 | Brighton & Hove Albion | 18 | 5 | 1 | 12 | 42 | 53 | 0.792 | 11 |
| 10 | Southampton | 18 | 4 | 0 | 14 | 41 | 64 | 0.641 | 8 |

Source: Rec.Sport.Soccer Statistics Foundation

=== Football League South Group C ===
| Pos | Team | Pld | W | D | L | GF | GA | GR | Pts |
|---|---|---|---|---|---|---|---|---|---|
| 1 | Tottenham Hotspur | 18 | 11 | 4 | 3 | 43 | 30 | 1.433 | 26 |
| 2 | West Ham United | 18 | 10 | 4 | 4 | 53 | 28 | 1.893 | 24 |
| 3 | Arsenal | 18 | 9 | 5 | 4 | 41 | 26 | 1.577 | 23 |
| 4 | Brentford | 18 | 8 | 4 | 6 | 42 | 34 | 1.235 | 20 |
| 5 | Millwall | 18 | 7 | 5 | 6 | 36 | 30 | 1.200 | 19 |
| 6 | Charlton Athletic | 18 | 7 | 4 | 7 | 39 | 36 | 1.083 | 18 |
| 7 | Fulham | 18 | 8 | 1 | 9 | 38 | 42 | 0.905 | 17 |
| 8 | Southampton | 18 | 5 | 3 | 10 | 28 | 55 | 0.509 | 13 |
| 9 | Chelsea | 18 | 4 | 3 | 11 | 33 | 53 | 0.623 | 11 |
| 10 | Portsmouth | 18 | 3 | 3 | 12 | 26 | 45 | 0.578 | 9 |

Source: Rec.Sport.Soccer Statistics Foundation

== Results ==
Brentford's goal tally listed first.

=== Legend ===
| Win | Draw | Loss |

=== Football League First Division ===
| No. | Date | Opponent | Venue | Result | Attendance | Scorer |
|---|---|---|---|---|---|---|
| 1 | 26 August 1939 | Everton | A | 1–1 | 30,466 | Saunders |
| 2 | 28 August 1939 | Blackpool | A | 1–2 | 21,633 | Boulter |
| 3 | 2 September 1939 | Huddersfield Town | H | 1–0 | 12,079 | Holliday |

=== Football League South Group B ===
| No. | Date | Opponent | Venue | Result | Attendance | Scorer(s) |
|---|---|---|---|---|---|---|
| 1 | 21 October 1939 | Chelsea | H | 2–2 | 6,628 | Holliday, Gorman |
| 2 | 28 October 1939 | Portsmouth | A | 1–3 | 3,000 | Boulter |
| 3 | 4 November 1939 | Southampton | H | 3–1 | 4,757 | Boulter (2), Manley |
| 4 | 11 November 1939 | Queens Park Rangers | A | 0–1 | 8,000 | |
| 5 | 18 November 1939 | Brighton & Hove Albion | H | 4–1 | 3,533 | Holliday (3), Townsend |
| 6 | 25 November 1939 | Aldershot | A | 0–1 | 4,000 | |
| 7 | 2 December 1939 | Reading | H | 3–0 | 4,077 | Smith, Holliday (2) |
| 8 | 9 December 1939 | Bournemouth & Boscombe Athletic | H | 5–2 | 4,680 | Townsend (2), McKenzie, Hopkins, Boulter |
| 9 | 16 December 1939 | Fulham | A | 4–2 | 5,000 | Holliday, Hopkins, Manley |
| 10 | 25 December 1939 | Portsmouth | H | 4–0 | 4,811 | Holliday (3), Manley |
| 11 | 26 December 1939 | Southampton | A | 3–2 | 6,000 | Holliday, Hopkins, Townsend |
| 12 | 30 December 1939 | Queens Park Rangers | H | 0–7 | 3,942 | |
| 13 | 6 January 1940 | Brighton & Hove Albion | A | 2–3 | 2,071 | Manley (2) |
| 14 | 13 January 1940 | Aldershot | H | 4–3 | 1,836 | Townsend (2), W. Brown, Hopkins |
| 15 | 20 January 1940 | Reading | A | 1–3 | 1,900 | Hopkins |
| 16 | 24 January 1940 | Chelsea | A | 2–3 | 2,000 | Griffith (og), Holliday |
| 17 | 27 January 1940 | Bournemouth & Boscombe Athletic | A | 2–2 | 3,000 | James, Holliday |
| 18 | 14 February 1940 | Fulham | H | 2–5 | 1,885 | Wilkins, McKenzie |

=== Football League South Group C ===
| No. | Date | Opponent | Venue | Result | Attendance | Scorer(s) |
|---|---|---|---|---|---|---|
| 1 | 10 February 1940 | Arsenal | A | 1–3 | 5,000 | Boulter |
| 2 | 17 February 1940 | West Ham United | H | 4–3 | 1,885 | Smith, Boulter, McKenzie (pen), Wilkins |
| 3 | 24 February 1940 | Charlton Athletic | A | 2–3 | 7,000 | Wilkins, McKenzie (pen) |
| 4 | 2 March 1940 | Chelsea | H | 1–1 | 7,110 | McCulloch |
| 5 | 9 March 1940 | Tottenham Hotspur | A | 1–1 | 9,815 | Yorston |
| 6 | 16 March 1940 | Southampton | H | 5–0 | 3,600 | Yorston (2), Hunt |
| 7 | 22 March 1940 | Portsmouth | H | 3–1 | 6,500 | Wilkins, McKenzie (2) |
| 8 | 23 March 1940 | Millwall | A | 1–4 | 14,490 | Hunt |
| 9 | 25 March 1940 | Portsmouth | A | 3–1 | 8,000 | Holliday, Wilkins, Hunt |
| 10 | 30 March 1940 | Fulham | H | 5–0 | 6,956 | Hunt (2), Yorston, Wilkins, W. Brown |
| 11 | 6 April 1940 | Arsenal | H | 2–4 | 8,000 | Yorston, Doherty |
| 12 | 10 April 1940 | Southampton | A | 1–4 | 4,000 | Wilkins |
| 13 | 13 April 1940 | West Ham United | A | 1–1 | 8,000 | Hunt |
| 14 | 17 April 1940 | Millwall | H | 1–1 | 5,000 | Doherty |
| 15 | 4 May 1940 | Tottenham Hotspur | H | 2–3 | 5,521 | Wilkins, Hutchins (og) |
| 16 | 11 May 1940 | Chelsea | H | 2–0 | 3,168 | McKenzie (pen), Hopkins |
| 17 | 18 May 1940 | Charlton Athletic | H | 2–1 | 3,000 | Hunt, Hopkins |
| 18 | 3 June 1940 | Fulham | A | 5–3 | 1,000 | Wilkins (2), Burgess (2), Holliday |

=== Football League War Cup ===
| Round | Date | Opponent | Venue | Result | Attendance | Scorer |
|---|---|---|---|---|---|---|
| 1R (1st leg) | 20 April 1940 | Fulham | A | 1–4 | 12,000 | Smith |
| 1R (2nd leg) | 27 April 1940 | Fulham | H | 1–2 (lost 6–2 on aggregate) | 7,695 | J. Brown |

- Sources: A-Z Of Bees, Rothmans Book of Football League Records 1888–89 to 1978–79, 100 Years Of Brentford

== Playing squad ==
Players' ages are as of the opening day of the 1939–40 season.

| Pos. | Name | Nat. | Date of birth (age) | Signed from | Signed in | Notes |
Goalkeepers
| GK | Frank Clack | (England) | 30 March 1912 (aged 27) | Birmingham | 1939 | |
| GK | Joe Crozier | (Scotland) | 2 December 1914 (aged 24) | East Fife | 1937 | Guest for Airdrieonians |
| GK | Ted Gaskell | (England) | 19 December 1916 (aged 22) | Buxton | 1937 | |
| Defenders | | | | | | |
| DF | Jimmy Anderson | (England) | 26 July 1913 (aged 26) | Queen of the South | 1939 | Guest for Queen of the South |
| DF | Bill Gorman | (Republic of Ireland) | 13 January 1911 (aged 28) | Bury | 1938 | |
| DF | George Poyser | (England) | 6 February 1910 (aged 29) | Port Vale | 1934 | |
Midfielders
| HB | Vic Aicken | (Ireland) | 29 October 1914 (aged 24) | Glentoran | 1937 | |
| HB | Buster Brown | (England) | 6 September 1910 (aged 28) | Huddersfield Town | 1937 | |
| HB | Joe James | (England) | 13 January 1910 (aged 29) | Battersea Church | 1929 | |
| HB | Tom Manley (c) | (England) | 7 October 1912 (aged 26) | Manchester United | 1939 | |
Forwards
| FW | Les Boulter | (Wales) | 31 August 1913 (aged 25) | Charlton Athletic | 1939 | |
| FW | Tommy Cheetham | (England) | 11 October 1910 (aged 28) | Queens Park Rangers | 1939 | |
| FW | Fred Durrant | (England) | 19 June 1921 (aged 18) | Folkestone | 1938 | |
| FW | Jack Holliday | (England) | 19 December 1908 (aged 30) | Middlesbrough | 1932 | |
| FW | Idris Hopkins | (Wales) | 11 October 1910 (aged 28) | Crystal Palace | 1932 | |
| FW | Johnny Kay | (Scotland) | n/a | Unattached | 1939 | Amateur |
| FW | Ernest Muttitt | (England) | 24 July 1908 (aged 31) | Middlesbrough | 1932 | Guest for Fulham and Southend United |
| FW | Percy Saunders | (England) | 9 July 1916 (aged 23) | Sunderland | 1939 | |
| FW | Billy Scott | (England) | 6 December 1907 (aged 31) | Middlesbrough | 1932 | Guest for Newcastle United |
| FW | Les Smith | (England) | 13 March 1918 (aged 21) | Petersham | 1934 | |
| FW | Bob Thomas | (England) | 2 August 1919 (aged 20) | Golders Green | 1939 | |
| FW | Len Townsend | (England) | 31 August 1917 (aged 21) | Hayes | 1937 | Guest for Plymouth Argyle |
| FW | George Wilkins | (England) | 27 October 1919 (aged 19) | Hayes | 1939 | |
Guest players
| GK | Charlie Hillam | (England) | 6 October 1908 (aged 30) | Southend United | 1940 | Guest from Southend United |
| GK | John Jackson | (Scotland) | 29 November 1906 (aged 32) | Chelsea | 1940 | Guest from Chelsea |
| GK | Bill Mason | (England) | 31 October 1908 (aged 30) | Queens Park Rangers | 1940 | Guest from Queens Park Rangers |
| GK | Vic Woodley | (England) | 26 February 1910 (aged 29) | Chelsea | 1940 | Guest from Chelsea |
| DF | Ted Reay | (England) | 5 August 1914 (aged 25) | Queens Park Rangers | 1940 | Guest from Queens Park Rangers |
| DF | Harold Shepherdson | (England) | 22 October 1918 (aged 20) | Middlesbrough | 1940 | Guest from Middlesbrough |
| HB | Alec Farmer | (Scotland) | 9 October 1908 (aged 30) | Queens Park Rangers | 1940 | Guest from Queens Park Rangers |
| HB | Duncan McKenzie | (Scotland) | 10 August 1912 (aged 27) | Middlesbrough | 1939 | Guest from Middlesbrough |
| HB | Archie Scott | (Scotland) | 22 July 1905 (aged 34) | Unattached | 1939 | Guest |
| FW | Jim Brown | (United States) | 31 December 1908 (aged 30) | Guildford City | 1940 | Guest from Guildford City |
| FW | Harry Burgess | (England) | 20 August 1904 (aged 35) | Chelsea | 1940 | Guest from Chelsea |
| FW | Peter Doherty | (Ireland) | 5 June 1913 (aged 26) | Manchester City | 1940 | Guest from Manchester City |
| FW | Douglas Hunt | (England) | 19 May 1914 (aged 25) | Sheffield Wednesday | 1940 | Guest from Sheffield Wednesday |
| FW | David McCulloch | (Scotland) | 5 October 1912 (aged 26) | Derby County | 1940 | Guest from Derby County |
| FW | Bert Stephens | (England) | 13 May 1909 (aged 30) | Brighton & Hove Albion | 1940 | Guest from Brighton & Hove Albion |
| FW | Benny Yorston | (Scotland) | 14 October 1905 (aged 33) | Middlesbrough | 1940 | Guest from Middlesbrough |

- Sources: Timeless Bees, Football League Players' Records 1888 to 1939, 100 Years Of Brentford

== Coaching staff ==
| Name | Role |
|---|---|
| (England) Harry Curtis | Manager |
| (Scotland) Jimmy Bain | Assistant manager |
| (England) Bob Kane | Trainer |
| (England) Jack Cartmell | Assistant trainer |

== Statistics ==
=== Appearances and goals ===

Brentford's highest appearance-makers in each position during the Football League South season.

| Pos | Nat | Name | League | | League S B | | League S C | | L War Cup | | Total | |
| Pos | Nat | Name | Apps | Goals | Apps | Goals | Apps | Goals | Apps | Goals | Apps | Goals |
|---|---|---|---|---|---|---|---|---|---|---|---|---|
| GK | (England) | Frank Clack | — | | 2 | 0 | 1 | 0 | 2 | 0 | 5 | 0 |
| GK | (Scotland) | Joe Crozier | 3 | 0 | 1 | 0 | — | | — | | 4 | 0 |
| GK | (England) | Ted Gaskell | — | | 15 | 0 | 5 | 0 | — | | 20 | 0 |
| DF | (England) | Jimmy Anderson | 3 | 0 | — | | — | | — | | 3 | 0 |
| DF | (Republic of Ireland) | Bill Gorman | 3 | 0 | 17 | 1 | 17 | 0 | 2 | 0 | 39 | 1 |
| DF | (England) | George Poyser | — | | 16 | 0 | 16 | 0 | 2 | 0 | 34 | 0 |
| HB | (Ireland) | Vic Aicken | — | | 1 | 0 | — | | — | | 1 | 0 |
| HB | (England) | Buster Brown | 2 | 0 | 15 | 1 | 12 | 1 | 1 | 0 | 30 | 2 |
| HB | (England) | Joe James | 3 | 0 | 16 | 1 | 14 | 0 | 1 | 0 | 34 | 1 |
| HB | (England) | Tom Manley | 3 | 0 | 15 | 5 | — | | 1 | 0 | 19 | 5 |
| FW | (Wales) | Les Boulter | 3 | 1 | 9 | 4 | 2 | 1 | — | | 14 | 6 |
| FW | (England) | Tommy Cheetham | 2 | 0 | — | | 1 | 0 | — | | 3 | 0 |
| FW | (England) | Fred Durrant | — | | — | | — | | 1 | 0 | 1 | 0 |
| FW | (England) | Jack Holliday | 1 | 1 | 16 | 14 | 9 | 2 | 1 | 0 | 27 | 17 |
| FW | (Wales) | Idris Hopkins | 3 | 0 | 16 | 5 | 17 | 2 | 2 | 0 | 38 | 7 |
| FW | (Scotland) | Johnny Kay | — | | — | | 3 | 0 | — | | 3 | 0 |
| FW | (England) | Ernest Muttitt | — | | 1 | 0 | 5 | 0 | 1 | 0 | 7 | 0 |
| FW | (England) | Percy Saunders | 2 | 1 | 5 | 0 | — | | — | | 7 | 1 |
| FW | (England) | Billy Scott | 2 | 0 | 1 | 0 | 2 | 0 | 2 | 0 | 7 | 0 |
| FW | (England) | Les Smith | 3 | 0 | 15 | 2 | 9 | 1 | 2 | 1 | 29 | 4 |
| FW | (England) | Bob Thomas | — | | 2 | 0 | 1 | 0 | — | | 3 | 0 |
| FW | (England) | Len Townsend | — | | 6 | 5 | 2 | 0 | — | | 8 | 5 |
| FW | (England) | George Wilkins | — | | 9 | 1 | 18 | 6 | 2 | 0 | 29 | 7 |
Players guested during the season
| GK | (Scotland) | Charlie Hillam | — | | — | | 1 | 0 | — | | 1 | 0 |
| GK | (Scotland) | John Jackson | — | | — | | 6 | 0 | — | | 6 | 0 |
| GK | (England) | Bill Mason | — | | — | | 1 | 0 | — | | 1 | 0 |
| GK | (England) | Vic Woodley | — | | — | | 3 | 0 | — | | 3 | 0 |
| DF | (England) | Ted Reay | — | | 1 | 0 | 1 | 0 | — | | 2 | 0 |
| DF | (England) | Harold Shepherdson | — | | — | | 1 | 0 | — | | 1 | 0 |
| HB | (Scotland) | Alec Farmer | — | | — | | — | | 1 | 0 | 1 | 0 |
| HB | (Scotland) | Duncan McKenzie | — | | 16 | 2 | 18 | 5 | — | | 34 | 7 |
| HB | (Scotland) | Archie Scott | — | | — | | 1 | 0 | — | | 1 | 0 |
| FW | (United States) | Jim Brown | — | | — | | — | | 1 | 1 | 1 | 1 |
| FW | (England) | Harry Burgess | — | | — | | 1 | 2 | — | | 1 | 2 |
| FW | (Ireland) | Peter Doherty | — | | — | | 3 | 2 | — | | 3 | 2 |
| FW | (England) | Douglas Hunt | — | | — | | 10 | 9 | — | | 10 | 9 |
| FW | (Scotland) | David McCulloch | — | | — | | 5 | 2 | — | | 5 | 2 |
| FW | (England) | Bert Stephens | — | | 1 | 1 | — | | — | | 1 | 1 |
| FW | (Scotland) | Benny Yorston | — | | — | | 8 | 5 | — | | 8 | 5 |

- Players listed in italics left the club mid-season.
- Source: 100 Years Of Brentford

=== Goalscorers ===
| Pos. | Nat | Player | FL1 | FLB | FLC | LWC | Total |
|---|---|---|---|---|---|---|---|
| FW | (England) | Jack Holliday | 1 | 14 | 2 | 0 | 17 |
| FW | (England) | Douglas Hunt | — | — | 9 | — | 9 |
| FW | (Wales) | Idris Hopkins | 0 | 5 | 2 | 0 | 7 |
| HB | (Scotland) | Duncan McKenzie | — | 2 | 5 | — | 7 |
| FW | (England) | George Wilkins | — | 1 | 6 | 0 | 7 |
| FW | (Wales) | Les Boulter | 1 | 4 | 1 | — | 6 |
| HB | (England) | Tom Manley | 0 | 5 | — | 0 | 5 |
| FW | (England) | Len Townsend | — | 5 | 0 | — | 5 |
| FW | (Scotland) | Benny Yorston | — | — | 5 | — | 5 |
| FW | (England) | Les Smith | 0 | 2 | 1 | 1 | 4 |
| HB | (England) | Buster Brown | 0 | 1 | 1 | 0 | 2 |
| FW | (England) | Harry Burgess | — | — | 2 | — | 2 |
| FW | (Ireland) | Peter Doherty | — | — | 2 | — | 2 |
| FW | (Scotland) | David McCulloch | — | — | 2 | — | 2 |
| FW | (England) | Percy Saunders | 1 | 0 | — | — | 1 |
| FW | (United States) | Jim Brown | — | — | — | 1 | 1 |
| FW | (England) | Bert Stephens | — | 1 | — | — | 1 |
| DF | (Republic of Ireland) | Bill Gorman | 0 | 1 | 0 | 0 | 1 |
| HB | (England) | Joe James | 0 | 1 | 0 | 0 | 1 |
| Opponents | | | 0 | 1 | 1 | 0 | 1 |
| Total | | | 3 | 42 | 42 | 2 | 89 |

- Players listed in italics left the club mid-season.
- Source: 100 Years Of Brentford

=== Wartime international caps ===
| Pos. | Nat | Player | Caps | Goals | Ref |
|---|---|---|---|---|---|
| FW | (Wales) | Idris Hopkins | 3 | 0 | |
| FW | (England) | Les Smith | 1 | 0 | |

=== Management ===
| Name | Nat | From | To | Record All Comps | | | | |
| Name | Nat | From | To | P | W | D | L | W % |
|---|---|---|---|---|---|---|---|---|
| Harry Curtis | (England) | 26 August 1939 | 3 June 1940 | 41 | 17 | 7 | 17 | 41.46 |

=== Summary ===
| Games played | 41 (3 Football League, 18 Football League South Group B, 18 Football League South Group C, 2 Football League War Cup) |
| Games won | 17 (1 Football League, 8 Football League South Group B, 8 Football League South Group C, 0 Football League War Cup) |
| Games drawn | 7 (1 Football League, 2 Football League South Group B, 4 Football League South Group C, 0 Football League War Cup) |
| Games lost | 17 (1 Football League, 8 Football League South Group B, 6 Football League South Group C, 2 Football League War Cup) |
| Goals scored | 89 (3 Football League, 42 Football League South Group B, 42 Football League South Group C, 2 Football League War Cup) |
| Goals conceded | 84 (3 Football League, 41 Football League South Group B, 34 Football League South Group C, 6 Football League War Cup) |
| Clean sheets | 6 (1 Football League, 2 Football League South Group B, 3 Football League South Group C, 0 Football League War Cup) |
| Biggest league win | 5–0 on two occasions |
| Worst league defeat | 7–0 versus Queens Park Rangers, 30 December 1939 |
| Most appearances | 39, Bill Gorman (3 Football League, 17 Football League South Group B, 17 Football League South Group C, 2 Football League War Cup) |
| Top scorer (league) | 17, Jack Holliday |
| Top scorer (all competitions) | 17, Jack Holliday |

== Transfers & loans ==
Guest players' arrival and departure dates correspond to their first and last appearances of the season.

Players transferred in
| Date | Pos. | Name | Previous club | Fee | Ref. |
|---|---|---|---|---|---|
| May 1939 | FW | (England) Bob Thomas | (England) Golders Green | n/a | |
| 27 July 1939 | DF | (England) Jimmy Anderson | (Scotland) Queen of the South | n/a | |
| July 1939 | GK | (England) Frank Clack | (England) Birmingham | n/a | |
| August 1939 | HB | (England) Tom Manley | (England) Manchester United | n/a | |
| 1939 | FW | (England) Percy Saunders | (England) Sunderland | n/a | |
Guest players in
| Date from | Pos. | Name | From | Date to | Ref. |
| 28 October 1939 | HB | (Scotland) Archie Scott | Unattached | 28 October 1939 | |
| 4 November 1939 | HB | (Scotland) Duncan McKenzie | (England) Middlesbrough | End of season | |
| 11 November 1939 | FW | (England) Bert Stephens | (England) Brighton & Hove Albion | 11 November 1939 | |
| 24 January 1940 | GK | (England) Bill Mason | (England) Queens Park Rangers | 24 January 1940 | |
| 24 January 1940 | DF | (England) Harold Shepherdson | (England) Middlesbrough | 24 January 1940 | |
| 10 February 1940 | FW | (Scotland) David McCulloch | (England) Derby County | 9 March 1940 | |
| 14 February 1940 | DF | (England) Ted Reay | (England) Queens Park Rangers | 17 February 1940 | |
| 9 March 1940 | GK | (Scotland) John Jackson | (England) Chelsea | End of season | |
| 9 March 1940 | FW | (Scotland) Benny Yorston | (England) Middlesbrough | 4 May 1940 | |
| 16 March 1940 | GK | (Scotland) Charlie Hillam | (England) Southend United | 16 March 1940 | |
| 16 March 1940 | FW | (England) Douglas Hunt | (England) Sheffield Wednesday | 18 May 1940 | |
| 6 April 1940 | FW | (Ireland) Peter Doherty | (England) Manchester City | 17 April 1940 | |
| 17 April 1940 | GK | (England) Vic Woodley | (England) Chelsea | 18 May 1940 | |
| 20 April 1940 | HB | (Scotland) Alec Farmer | (England) Queens Park Rangers | 20 April 1940 | |
| 27 April 1940 | FW | (United States) Jim Brown | (England) Guildford City | 27 April 1940 | |
| 3 June 1940 | FW | (England) Harry Burgess | (England) Chelsea | End of season | |
Players transferred out
| Date | Pos. | Name | Subsequent club | Fee | Ref. |
| 10 July 1939 | HB | (England) Sam Briddon | (Wales) Swansea Town | n/a | |
| 10 July 1939 | HB | (Scotland) Tally Sneddon | (Wales) Swansea Town | n/a | |
| 14 August 1939 | DF | (England) Joe Wilson | (England) Reading | n/a | |
Guest players out
| Date from | Pos. | Name | To | Date to | Ref. |
| 7 October 1939 | FW | (England) Billy Scott | (England) Newcastle United | 13 January 1940 | |
| 24 October 1939 | GK | (Scotland) Joe Crozier | (Scotland) Airdrieonians | End of season | |
| 16 December 1939 | DF | (Scotland) Doug Anderson | (Scotland) Aberdeen | 2 March 1940 | |
| 27 January 1940 | FW | (England) Len Townsend | (England) Plymouth Argyle | 27 April 1940 | |
| n/a | DF | (England) Jimmy Anderson | (Scotland) Queen of the South | n/a | |
| n/a | HB | (England) Ernest Muttitt | (England) Fulham | n/a | |
| n/a | HB | (England) Ernest Muttitt | (England) Southend United | n/a | |
Players released
| Date | Pos. | Name | Subsequent club | Join date | Ref. |
| 1939 | FW | (England) Fred Rowell | (England) Bournemouth | September 1941 | |
