= 1941–42 Arsenal F.C. season =

English football club season

Arsenal
1941–42 season
- Chairman: Robin Vane-Tempest-Stewart, 8th Marquess of Londonderry
- Manager: George Allison
- London War League: 1st
- London War Cup: Semi-final
Home colours

The 1941–42 season was Arsenal Football Club's third season playing wartime football and their first in the London War League, a breakoff from the official Football League wartime leagues. Arsenal won the London War League. The team also competed in the London War Cup and lost in the semifinals.

== Background ==
Arsenal played their home games at White Hart Lane, as Highbury had been transformed to support Air Raid Precautions. Arsenal competed in the London War League. The London teams, as the London War League was unsanctioned, were expelled from the Football League. Arsenal's manager, George Allison, was influential in the London club's breakaway movement.

Arsenal competed in the London War Cup, the second iteration of the competition. Arsenal faced Brentford in the semifinals, tying the first match and requiring a replay. Arsenal then lost the replay as the Brentford goalkeeper, Chelsea player John Jackson who was fielded as a "guest" player, saved a Cliff Bastin penalty to maintain a 2-1 score to Brentford.

Arsenal won the London War League, scoring 108 goals in 30 matches. Although the London league claimed less travel than the official Football League scheme, it similarly featured depleted teams and one-sided matches. Arsenal played one match against bottom-of-the-table Watford and were only able to field eight men and lost 3-1. Playing the same team three months later, Arsenal won 11-0.

== Results ==
Arsenal's score comes first

=== Legend ===
| Win | Draw | Loss |

=== London War League ===
Selected results from the league.

| Date | Opponent | Venue | Result | Attendance | Scorers |
|---|---|---|---|---|---|
| 30 August 1941 | Brentford | A | 4–1 | 12,000 | |
| 4 October 1941 | Chelsea | H | 3–0 | | |
| 18 October 1941 | West Ham United | H | 4–1 | 13,419 | |
| 13 December 1941 | Brentford | H | 1–3 | 9,739 | |
| 3 January 1942 | Portsmouth | H | ?–? | | |
| 10 January 1942 | Chelsea | A | 5–1 | | |
| 24 January 1942 | West Ham United | A | 0–3 | 20,000 | |

==== Final league table ====
| Pos | Team | Pld | W | D | L | GF | GA | GR | Pts |
|---|---|---|---|---|---|---|---|---|---|
| 1 | Arsenal | 30 | 23 | 2 | 5 | 108 | 43 | 2.512 | 48 |
| 2 | Portsmouth | 30 | 20 | 2 | 8 | 105 | 59 | 1.780 | 42 |
| 3 | West Ham United | 30 | 17 | 5 | 8 | 81 | 44 | 1.841 | 39 |
| 4 | Aldershot | 30 | 17 | 5 | 8 | 85 | 56 | 1.518 | 39 |
| 5 | Tottenham Hotspur | 30 | 15 | 8 | 7 | 61 | 41 | 1.488 | 38 |
| 6 | Crystal Palace | 30 | 14 | 6 | 10 | 70 | 53 | 1.321 | 34 |
| 7 | Reading | 30 | 13 | 8 | 9 | 76 | 58 | 1.310 | 34 |
| 8 | Charlton Athletic | 30 | 14 | 5 | 11 | 72 | 64 | 1.125 | 33 |
| 9 | Brentford | 30 | 14 | 2 | 14 | 80 | 76 | 1.053 | 30 |
| 10 | Queen's Park Rangers | 30 | 11 | 3 | 16 | 52 | 59 | 0.881 | 25 |
| 11 | Fulham | 30 | 10 | 4 | 16 | 79 | 99 | 0.798 | 24 |
| 12 | Brighton & Hove Albion | 30 | 9 | 4 | 17 | 71 | 108 | 0.657 | 22 |
| 13 | Chelsea | 30 | 8 | 4 | 18 | 56 | 88 | 0.636 | 20 |
| 14 | Millwall | 30 | 7 | 5 | 18 | 53 | 82 | 0.646 | 19 |
| 15 | Clapton Orient | 30 | 5 | 7 | 18 | 42 | 94 | 0.447 | 17 |
| 16 | Watford | 30 | 6 | 4 | 20 | 47 | 114 | 0.412 | 16 |

=== London War Cup ===
| Round | Date | Opponent | Venue | Result | Attendance | Goalscorers |
|---|---|---|---|---|---|---|
| GS | 28 March 1942 | West Ham United | A | 4–0 | 4,000 | |
| GS | 6 April 1942 | West Ham United | H | 1–4 | 22,000 | |
| SF | 2 May 1942 | Brentford | N | 0–0 | 41,154 | |
| SF R | 16 May 1942 | Brentford | N | 1–2 | 40,000 | |
