= 1940–41 Chelsea F.C. season =

English football club season

Chelsea
1940–41 season
- Chairman: Joe Mears
- Manager: Billy Birrell
- Stadium: Stamford Bridge
- Football League South: 21st
- London War Cup: Group stage
- Football League War Cup: Third round
Home colours	Away colours

The 1940–41 season was Chelsea Football Club's second season of wartime football during the Second World War. As the Football League and the FA Cup were suspended for the duration, the club instead competed in regional competitions. Records and statistics for these matches are considered unofficial. Due to the disruption of the war, many scheduled matches were not completed. Chelsea finished 21st in the 32-team Football League South.
