= 1941–42 Chelsea F.C. season =

English football club season

Chelsea
1941–42 season
- Chairman: Joe Mears
- Manager: Billy Birrell
- Stadium: Stamford Bridge
- London League: 13th
- London War Cup: Group stage
Home colours	Away colours

The 1941–42 season was Chelsea Football Club's third season of wartime football during the Second World War. As the Football League and the FA Cup were suspended for the duration, the club instead competed in regional competitions. Records and statistics for these matches are considered unofficial. Due to the disruption of the war, many scheduled matches were not completed and the club often fielded guest players from other clubs. Chelsea finished 13th in the 16-team London League.
