= 1940–41 Arsenal F.C. season =

English football club season

Arsenal
1940–41 season
- Chairman: Robin Vane-Tempest-Stewart, 8th Marquess of Londonderry
- Manager: George Allison
- Football League South: 4th
- Football League War Cup: Finalists
Home colours

The 1940–41 season was the second of Arsenal Football Club's seasons in the Wartime League, a football competition which temporarily replaced the Football League. Arsenal competed in the Football League South, finishing fourth. The team also reached the final of the Football League War Cup, losing to Preston North End at Wembley.

== Background ==
Arsenal played their home games at White Hart Lane, as Highbury had been transformed to support Air Raid Precautions. In October 1940, a 1,000lb bomb fell near the stadium and concrete was blown over the Clock End. On 17 April 1941, the North Bank was directly hit, causing significant damage.

Arsenal competed in the Football League South, finishing fourth. They also competed in both the Football League War Cup and the London War Cup. The London War Cup, a breakaway cup formed by twelve regional teams, began with a round-robin of two groups of six, where the group winners reached the finals. Arsenal did not win their group and did not reach the final.

Arsenal reached the final of the Football League War Cup, which was officially sanctioned by the Football League. The game was played at Wembley which had been a regular night-raid target during the Blitz. The first leg of the final was played in front of around 60,000 fans. However, after Leslie Compton missed a penalty in the third minute and Arsenal soon went down 1-0. Dennis Compton, Leslie Compton's younger brother, scored one for Arsenal, tying up the match and the score remained at 1-1. The final went to a replay, played at Ewood Park. Arsenal lost 2-1.

== Results ==
Arsenal's score comes first

=== Legend ===
Win	Draw	Loss

=== Football League South ===
Selected results from the league.

Date	Opponent	Venue	Result	Attendance	Scorers
21 September 1940	Brentford	A	3–1	1,700	
26 October 1940	Brentford	H	3–3	1,200	
25 December 1940	West Ham United	A	4–2	9,000	
14 April 1941	Chelsea	A	1–3		

==== Final League table ====
Pos	Team	Pld	W	D	L	GF	GA	GR	Pts
1	Crystal Palace (C)	27	16	4	7	86	44	1.955	39 (Note: 3 bonus points?)
2	West Ham United	27	14	6	7	70	39	1.795	34
3	Coventry City	10	5	3	2	28	16	1.750	13
4	Arsenal	19	10	5	4	66	38	1.737	25
5	Cardiff City	24	12	5	7	75	50	1.500	29
6	Reading	26	14	5	7	73	51	1.431	33
7	Norwich City	19	9	2	8	75	53	1.415	20
8	Watford	35	15	6	14	96	73	1.315	36
9	Portsmouth	31	16	2	13	92	71	1.296	34
10	Tottenham Hotspur	23	9	5	9	53	41	1.293	23
11	Millwall	31	16	5	10	79	59	1.339	37
12	Walsall	32	14	7	11	100	80	1.250	35
13	West Bromwich Albion	28	13	5	10	83	69	1.203	31
14	Leicester City	33	17	5	11	87	79	1.101	39
15	Northampton Town	30	14	3	13	84	71	1.183	31
16	Bristol City	20	10	2	8	55	48	1.146	22
17	Mansfield Town	29	12	6	11	77	68	1.132	30
18	Charlton Athletic	19	7	4	8	37	34	1.088	18
19	Aldershot	24	14	2	8	73	68	1.074	30
20	Brentford	23	9	3	11	51	51	1.000	21
21	Chelsea	23	10	4	9	57	58	0.983	24
22	Birmingham	16	7	1	8	38	43	0.884	15
23	Fulham	30	10	7	13	62	73	0.849	27
24	Luton Town	35	11	7	17	82	100	0.820	29
25	Stoke City	36	9	9	18	76	96	0.792	27
26	Queen's Park Rangers	23	8	3	12	47	60	0.783	19
27	Brighton & Hove Albion	25	8	7	10	51	75	0.680	23
28	Nottingham Forest	25	7	3	15	50	77	0.649	17
29	Bournemouth & Boscombe Athletic	27	9	3	15	59	92	0.641	21
30	Notts County	30	7	5	18	53	82	0.646	19
31	Southend United	30	5	7	18	42	94	0.447	17
32	Southampton	30	6	4	20	47	114	0.412	16
33	Swansea Town	30	7	5	18	53	82	0.646	19
34	Clapton Orient	30	5	7	18	42	94	0.447	17

(C) League Champions

=== London War Cup ===
Round	Date	Opponent	Venue	Result	Attendance	Goalscorers
GS	25 January 1941	West Ham United	A	3–1	5,000	
GS	17 May 1941	West Ham United	H	3–0	7,365	

=== Football League War Cup ===
Round	Date	Opponent	Venue	Result	Attendance	Goalscorers
R3 L1	15 March 1941	West Ham United	A	1–0	14,000	
R3 L2	29 March 1941	West Ham United	H	2–1		
F	10 May 1941	Preston North End	N	1–1	60,000	
F R	31 May 1941	Preston North End	N	1–2	45,000	
