= 1939–40 Arsenal F.C. season =

English football club season

Arsenal
1939–40 season
- Chairman: Robin Vane-Tempest-Stewart, 8th Marquess of Londonderry
- Manager: George Allison
- Football League South: 4th
| Home colours | Away colours |

The 1939–40 season was the first of Arsenal Football Club's seasons in the Wartime League, a football competition which temporarily replaced the Football League. Arsenal won the South 'A League.'

== Background ==
Although the 1939–40 Football League season began as normal on 26 August 1939, teams only played three matches. Britain declared war on Germany on 3 September 1939 and the Football League was abandoned. 42 of Arsenal's 44 professional players in September 1939 joined the services and many of the administrators followed. Arsenal's stadium was transformed for Air Raid Precautions.

Arsenal played six friendlies away from home as they negotiated the use of White Hart Lane and as the Wartime League was being organized.

Football resumed on 28 October 1939, with the clubs being organized into ten regional leagues. For each game, supporters could only travel from within 50 miles, and crowds were limited to 8,000. Arsenal's first match was against Charlton, which they won 8–4 with Leslie Compton scoring three penalties. The Football League War Cup was introduced in the spring of 1940.

Arsenal competed in the South 'A' League and South 'C' League. Arsenal won the 'A' league in 1939–40, and were to find further success in future wartime seasons. In the 'A' League, all of the matches except for one were played by 8 February 1940, with the last being played on 3 April. Once most of the games in the 'A' League had been played, Arsenal began to compete in the 'C' League in which they finished third.

== Results ==
Arsenal's score comes first

=== Legend ===
| Win | Draw | Loss |

=== Football League First Division ===
| Date | Opponent | Venue | Result | Attendance | Scorers |
|---|---|---|---|---|---|
| 26 August 1939 | Wolverhampton Wanderers | A | 2–2 | | |
| 30 August 1939 | Blackburn Rovers | H | 1–0 | | |
| 2 September 1939 | Sunderland | H | 5–2 | | |

League suspended due to World War II

=== Football League South ===
Selected results from the league.

| Date | Opponent | Venue | Result | Attendance |
|---|---|---|---|---|
| 21 October 1939 | Charlton Athletic | H | 8–4 | |
| 4 November 1939 | Crystal Palace | H | 5–0 | |
| 11 November 1939 | Norwich City | A | 1–1 | |
| 18 November 1939 | Tottenham Hotspur | H | 2–1 | |
| 25 November 1939 | Millwall | A | 3–3 | |
| 2 December 1939 | West Ham United | H | 3–0 | 10,000 |
| 9 December 1939 | Watford | A | 3–1 | |
| 16 December 1939 | Southend United | H | 5–1 | |
| 23 December 1939 | Charlton Athletic | A | ?–? | |
| 26 December 1939 | Crystal Palace | A | 3–0 | |
| 30 December 1939 | Norwich City | H | 3–0 | |
| 20 January 1940 | West Ham United | A | 0–3 | 8,000 |
| 10 February 1940 | Brentford | H | 3–1 | 5,000 |
| 16 March 1940 | West Ham United | H | 2–3 | 10,371 |
| 23 March 1940 | Chelsea | H | 3–0 | 1,200 |
| 8 April 1940 | West Ham United | A | 1–2 | 8,000 |
| 13 April 1940 | Portsmouth | H | 3–2 | |
| 17 April 1940 | Chelsea | A | 2–2 | |
| 6 April 1940 | Brentford | A | 4–2 | 8,000 |

==== Group A League table ====
| Pos | Team | Pld | W | D | L | GF | GA | GR | Pts |
|---|---|---|---|---|---|---|---|---|---|
| 1 | Arsenal (C) | 30 | 23 | 2 | 5 | 108 | 43 | 2.512 | 48 |
| 2 | West Ham United | 30 | 20 | 2 | 8 | 105 | 59 | 1.780 | 42 |
| 3 | Millwall | 30 | 17 | 5 | 8 | 81 | 44 | 1.841 | 39 |
| 4 | Watford | 30 | 17 | 5 | 8 | 85 | 56 | 1.518 | 39 |
| 5 | Norwich City | 30 | 15 | 8 | 7 | 61 | 41 | 1.488 | 38 |
| 6 | Charlton Athletic | 30 | 14 | 6 | 10 | 70 | 53 | 1.321 | 34 |
| 7 | Crystal Palace | 30 | 13 | 8 | 9 | 76 | 58 | 1.310 | 34 |
| 8 | Clapton Orient | 30 | 14 | 5 | 11 | 72 | 64 | 1.125 | 33 |
| 9 | Tottenham Hotspur | 30 | 14 | 2 | 14 | 80 | 76 | 1.053 | 30 |
| 10 | Southend United | 30 | 11 | 3 | 16 | 52 | 59 | 0.881 | 25 |

(C) League Champions

==== Group C League table ====
| Pos | Team | Pld | W | D | L | GF | GA | GR | Pts |
|---|---|---|---|---|---|---|---|---|---|
| 1 | Tottenham Hotspur (C) | 30 | 23 | 2 | 5 | 108 | 43 | 2.512 | 48 |
| 2 | West Ham United | 30 | 20 | 2 | 8 | 105 | 59 | 1.780 | 42 |
| 3 | Arsenal | 30 | 17 | 5 | 8 | 81 | 44 | 1.841 | 39 |
| 4 | Brentfordl | 30 | 17 | 5 | 8 | 85 | 56 | 1.518 | 39 |
| 5 | Millwall | 30 | 15 | 8 | 7 | 61 | 41 | 1.488 | 38 |
| 6 | Charlton Athletic | 30 | 14 | 6 | 10 | 70 | 53 | 1.321 | 34 |
| 7 | Fulham | 30 | 13 | 8 | 9 | 76 | 58 | 1.310 | 34 |
| 8 | Southampton | 30 | 14 | 5 | 11 | 72 | 64 | 1.125 | 33 |
| 9 | Chelsea | 30 | 14 | 2 | 14 | 80 | 76 | 1.053 | 30 |
| 10 | Portsmouth | 30 | 11 | 3 | 16 | 52 | 59 | 0.881 | 25 |

(C) League Champions
