= 1943–44 Arsenal F.C. season =

English football club season

Arsenal
1943–44 season
- Chairman: Robin Vane-Tempest-Stewart, 8th Marquess of Londonderry
- Manager: George Allison
- Football League South: 4th
- Football League South Cup: Semi-final

The 1943–44 season was Arsenal Football Club's fifth season playing wartime football during World War II. They finished fourth the Football League South. Arsenal failed to progress to the finals in the Football League South Cup.

== Background ==
Arsenal played their home games at White Hart Lane, as Highbury had been transformed to support Air Raid Precautions.

Arsenal found little success in 1943-44. The team finished fourth in the Football League South. Rivals Tottenham Hotspur won the league.

Arsenal had a poor showing in the 1943-44 Football League South Cup. The defending champions finished last in the group stage and failed to progress in the cup.

== Results ==
Arsenal's score comes first

=== Legend ===
Win	Draw	Loss

=== Football League South ===
Date	Opponent	Venue	Result	Attendance	Scorers
28 August 1943	Charlton Athletic	A	0–1		
4 September 1943	Southampton	H	4–1		
11 September 1943	West Ham United	A	1–1		
18 September 1943	Portsmouth	H	1–2		
25 September 1943	Brighton & Hove Albion	A	1–1		
2 October 1943	Fulham	A	4–3		
9 October 1943	Clapton Orient	A	1–1		
16 October 1943	Brentford	H	3–3		
23 October 1943	Watford	H	4–2		
30 October 1943	Crystal Palace	A	1–1		
6 November 1943	Chelsea	H	6–0		
13 November 1943	Queen's Park Rangers	H	5–0		
27 November 1943	Charlton Athletic	H	6–2		
4 December 1943	Southampton	A	2–1		
11 December 1943	West Ham United	H	1–1		
18 December 1943	Tottenham Hotspur	A	1–2		
25 December 1943	Millwall	A	5–1		
26 December 1943	Millwall	H	1–1		
1 January 1944	Portsmouth	A	1–2		
8 January 1944	Chelsea	A	0–2		
22 January 1944	Fulham	H	1–1		
29 January 1944	Clapton Orient	H	1–0		
5 February 1944	Brentford	A	4–1		
12 February 1944	Watford	A	2–0		
1 April 1944	Aldershot	A	3–0		
8 April 1944	Crystal Palace	H	5–2		
10 April 1944	Brighton & Hove Albion	H	3–1		
22 April 1944	Tottenham Hotspur	H	3–3		
29 April 1944	Queen's Park Rangers	A	1–1		
6 May 1944	Aldershot	H	3–1		

==== Final league table ====
Pos	Team	Pld	W	D	L	GF	GA	GR	Pts
1	Tottenham Hotspur (C)	30	19	8	3	71	36	1.972	46
2	West Ham United	30	17	7	6	74	39	1.897	41
3	Queen's Park Rangers	30	14	12	4	69	54	1.278	40
4	Arsenal	30	14	10	6	72	42	1.714	38
5	Crystal Palace	30	16	5	9	75	53	1.415	37
6	Portsmouth	30	16	5	9	68	59	1.153	37
7	Brentford	30	14	7	9	71	51	1.392	35
8	Chelsea	30	16	2	12	79	55	1.436	34
9	Fulham	30	11	9	10	80	73	1.096	31
10	Millwall	30	13	4	13	70	66	1.061	30
11	Aldershot	30	12	6	12	64	73	0.877	30
12	Reading	30	12	3	15	73	62	1.177	27
13	Southampton	30	10	7	13	67	88	0.761	27
14	Charlton Athletic	30	9	7	14	57	73	0.781	25
15	Watford	30	6	8	16	58	80	0.725	20
16	Brighton & Hove Albion	30	9	2	19	55	82	0.671	20
17	Clapton Orient	39	4	3	32	32	87	0.368	11
18	Luton Town	30	3	5	22	42	104	0.404	11

(C) League Champions

=== Football League South Cup ===
Round	Date	Opponent	Venue	Result	Attendance	Goalscorers
GS	4 March 1944	Reading	H	?–?		
GS	18 March 1944	Queen's Park Rangers	H	?–?		
