= Eddie Perry (footballer) =

Welsh footballer and manager

Edwin Perry (19 January 1909 – 31 October 1998) was a Welsh international footballer who became manager of Southend United between 1956 and 1960.

== Career ==
A centre forward 5 ft 11 in (1.80 m) tall, Perry was spotted whilst playing for Merthyr Town in an FA Cup tie. He played for Thames in 1930-31, scoring 16 goals. Fulham signed him, but it wasn't until 1936 that he claimed a first-team place after scoring 1933-34, having scored more than 100 goals for the reserves in three seasons. He joined Doncaster Rovers in November 1936, scoring 44 goals in 98 League games, staying with them until 1938, when he returned to Fulham.

He scored twice in the first London War Cup final for Brentford, who lost to Reading, though scored for them the following year when they won.

He gained three caps for Wales in 1937–38 against Scotland, England, and Ireland. He scored in the 2–1 defeat against England at Ayresome Park.

Perry guested for Brentford during the war, top-scoring in the 1940–41 and 1941–42 seasons.

He later managed Fulham's junior sides and played a key role in discovering Johnny Haynes.

He managed Southend United from 1956 until 1960.

== Honours ==
Brentford

- London War Cup: 1941–42
