= H. Duke =

H. Duke may refer to:

- Heather Duke, a character in the 1989 American film Heathers
- Henry Duke, 1st Baron Merrivale (1855–1939), British judge and Conservative politician
- Henry Duke (police officer), chief inspector with the City of London Police and Olympic tug of war competitor

== See also ==
- Harry Dukes (1912–1988), an English professional footballer
