= Ernie Collett (footballer) =

English footballer and coach

Personal information
- Full name: Ernest Collett
- Date of birth: 17 November 1914
- Place of birth: Sheffield, Yorkshire, England
- Date of death: 11 April 1980 (aged 65)
- Place of death: Islington, London, England
- Position: Wing half

Senior career*
Years	Team	Apps	(Gls)
1933–1949	Arsenal	20	(0)
1942	→ Brentford (guest)	0	(0)
- * Club domestic league appearances and goals

Ernest Collett (17 November 1914 – 11 April 1980) was an English football player and coach, mostly associated with Arsenal.

Collett was born in Sheffield and played for his working men's club team in Oughtibridge, before moving to Arsenal in 1933. He would remain on the club's book for sixteen years, although he only played 20 matches in this time.

He played at wing half and was mainly a reserve, having to wait four and a half years to make his first-team debut, which he did away to Stoke City at the Victoria Ground in a First Division match on 23 October 1937; he went on to make five appearances that season, as Arsenal won the League title.

Collett's best run in the Arsenal season was in 1938–39, when he made nine appearances deputising for Wilf Copping at left half. However, soon after that World War II began and league football was suspended. Collett still managed to make 187 unofficial appearances for Arsenal in wartime matches, winning two wartime league winners medals in 1939–40 and 1941–42.

In June 1940, he was one of five Arsenal players who guested for Southampton in a victory over Fulham at Craven Cottage. He also guested for Brentford, playing (and winning) the London War Cup final with them in 1941–42.

Collett played another six league games in 1946–47 before stepping down from the Arsenal first-team entirely, though he continued to play reserve-team football until 1949.

After his retirement from playing, he became a member of the club's backroom staff – he was at first George Male's assistant in coaching Arsenal's youth team, before moving into scouting, eventually became the club's chief scout, a job he held until his retirement in 1979; in total he was with Arsenal for 46 years, making him one of the club's most enduring servants.

Ernie Collett died in London in 1980, after being struck in an accident by a fire engine, aged 65.
