= 1941–42 Aston Villa F.C. season =

Aston Villa 1941–42 football season

Aston Villa
1941–42 season
- Chairman: Fred Normansell
- Manager: None
- Stadium: Villa Park
- First Division: suspended
- FA Cup: suspended

The 1941–42 English football season was Aston Villa's third season disrupted by Word War II. Between 1939 and 1946 normal competitive football was suspended in England. Many teams were depleted on account of the war effort, and fielded guest players instead. The Football League and FA Cup were suspended and in their place regional league competitions were set up. Appearances in these tournaments do not count in players' official records.

For 1941–1942 football clubs faced many struggles as, on account of the national war effort, the competitions including depleted teams, travel difficulties, and one-sided matches. The two Football League competitions were renamed to League North and League South, and the new London War League began their first season.

Villa Park had been commandeered of for the War effort but since the military authorities were not making so much use of it, it was again made available to the club from September 1941.

== Birmingham and District League ==
In June 1941 the directors report highlighted the club's youth policy: With a view to the future, a team was entered into the Birmingham and District League, and the promise shown by a number of young players including amateurs has been encouraging. For the second season Aston Villa entered the competition making use of Youth and whichever senior players that were available.

13 September 1941	Aston Villa	2–1	Royal Air Force 'H'	Villa Park
Note: For the first time since the Outbreak of war Villa Park was available for football. The grandstand seats had been loaned to the ARP for use in air-raid shelters and were not available for the match. One of Villa's proposed eleven was in the Army while the others were engaged in either war work or civil defence.

27 September 1941	Aston Villa	5–1	Wellington Town	Villa Park
Note: Villa's third successive Birmingham League victory.

== Birmingham League Cup ==
9 May 1942 Final	Aston Villa	4–2	Worcester City	Villa Park

== Friendlies ==
6 April 1942	Birmingham City	2–1	Aston Villa	St Andrew's
				Attendance: 10,000+
Note: Villa had beaten Blues four times this season but were beaten fifth time at a bomb damaged and fire-scarred St Andrew's. The players had to scramble over the debris to reach the pitch and, together at half-time, both teams huddled into a small hut used by demolition workers.
