= Tally Sneddon =

Scottish footballer and manager

Personal information
- Full name: William Cleland Sneddon
- Date of birth: 1 April 1914
- Place of birth: Wishaw, Scotland
- Date of death: April 1995 (aged 80–81)
- Place of death: Bangor, Wales
- Position: Wing half

Youth career
- Wishaw Juniors
- –1935: Rutherglen Glencairn

Senior career*
Years	Team	Apps	(Gls)
1935–1937	Falkirk	36	(8)
1937–1939	Brentford	66	(2)
1939–1946	Swansea Town	5	(0)
1940	→ Ayr United (guest)	2	(1)
1942–1943	→ Brentford (guest)	26	(2)
1942	→ Hamilton Academical (guest)	2	(0)
1946–1947	Newport County	18	(0)
- Milford United

Managerial career
- Milford United (player-manager)
- 1952–1953: Burton Albion
- * Club domestic league appearances and goals

William Cleland Sneddon (1 April 1914 – April 1995) was a Scottish professional footballer and manager who played as a wing half in the Football League for Brentford, Newport County and Swansea Town. He began his senior career in Scotland with Falkirk.

== Career ==
=== Early years ===
A wing half, Sneddon began his career in junior football with Wishaw Juniors and Rutherglen Glencairn. He began his senior career with Scottish League Second Division club Falkirk in December 1935 and made 44 appearances and scored eight goals before departing in June 1937.

=== Brentford ===
Sneddon moved to England to join First Division club Brentford for a £4,000 fee in June 1937, as a replacement for Welsh international Dai Richards. He quickly established himself in the side and made 44 appearances during the 1937–38 season. Sneddon found game-time harder to come by during the 1938–39 season and made 27 appearances, scoring two goals. He left Griffin Park at the end of the campaign, having made 70 appearances and scored two goals in his two seasons with the Bees.

=== Swansea Town ===
Sneddon and Brentford teammate Sam Briddon moved to Wales to sign for Second Division club Swansea Town in July 1939 for a then-club record £2,000 fee. The outbreak of the Second World War two months later put Sneddon's professional career on hold, though he continued to represent the Swans during the war. After the cessation of hostilities in 1945, Sneddon made two competitive appearances before leaving in November 1946.

==== Wartime guest appearances ====
Sneddon played as a guest for Scottish clubs Ayr United and Hamilton Academical as a guest during the Second World War. His most memorable spell came with a return to Brentford, who he helped to win the 1941–42 London War Cup. He returned again during the 1942–43 season.

=== Newport County ===
Sneddon joined Second Division club Newport County in November 1946 and he made 18 league appearances during the 1946–47 season before departing at the end of the campaign.

=== Milford United ===
Sneddon ended his career with a player-manager spell at Welsh League club Milford United.

== International career ==
Sneddon made an appearance for Scotland in a trial game while a Falkirk player, but failed to be called up to a senior squad.

== Managerial career ==
=== Milford United ===
While with Welsh League club Milford United, Sneddon combined his playing duties with that of the club's manager.

=== Burton Albion ===
Sneddon had a spell as manager of Birmingham and District League club Burton Albion between 1952 and 1953.

== Career statistics ==
Appearances and goals by club, season and competition
Club	Season	League			National Cup		Other		Total	
Club	Season	Division	Apps	Goals	Apps	Goals	Apps	Goals	Apps	Goals
Falkirk	1935–36	Scottish Second Division	6	0	0	0	—		5	0
Falkirk	1936–37	Scottish Second Division	36	8	2	0	—		38	8
Falkirk	Total		42	8	2	0	—		44	8
Brentford	1937–38	First Division	39	0	4	0	1 (Note: Appearance in Empire Exhibition Trophy)	0	44	0
Brentford	1938–39	First Division	27	2	0	0	—		27	2
Brentford	Total		66	2	4	0	1	0	71	2
Swansea Town	1946–47	Second Division	2	0	—		—		2	0
Career total			68	2	4	0	1	0	73	2

== Honours ==
Falkirk

- Falkirk Infirmary Shield: 1935–36, 1936–37

Brentford

- London War Cup: 1941–42
