= George Duke (footballer) =

English footballer (1920–1988)

Personal information
- Full name: George Edward Duke
- Date of birth: 6 September 1920
- Place of birth: Chichester, England
- Date of death: 19 March 1988 (aged 67)
- Place of death: Worthing, England
- Position: Goalkeeper

Senior career*
| Years | Team | Apps | (Gls) |
| –1939 | Southwick | | |
| 1939–1949 | Luton Town | 16 | (0) |
| 1949–1950 | Bournemouth & Boscombe Athletic | 10 | (0) |
- Guildford City
- * Club domestic league appearances and goals

George Edward Duke (6 September 1920 – 19 March 1988) was an English professional footballer who played as a goalkeeper in the Football League for Luton Town and Bournemouth & Boscombe Athletic.

== Career statistics ==
Appearances and goals by club, season and competition
| Club | Season | League | | | FA Cup | | Total | |
| Club | Season | Division | Apps | Goals | Apps | Goals | Apps | Goals |
|---|---|---|---|---|---|---|---|---|
| Luton Town | 1945–46 | ― | | | 2 | 0 | 2 | 0 |
| Luton Town | 1946–47 | Second Division | 10 | 0 | 0 | 0 | 10 | 0 |
| Luton Town | 1948–49 | Second Division | 6 | 0 | 0 | 0 | 6 | 0 |
| Career total | | | 16 | 0 | 2 | 0 | 18 | 0 |
