= Wartime League =

Football league competition held in England during World War II

The Wartime League was a football league competition held in England during World War II, which replaced the suspended Football League. The exclusion of the FA Cup in these years saw the creation of the Football League War Cup.

== History ==
=== The beginnings of wartime football during World War II ===
The 1939–40 Football League season began as normal on 26 August 1939. Following the German invasion of Poland and subsequent declaration of war by Britain against Nazi Germany on 3 September 1939, football matches were halted. The Football League teams had each played two to three League matches per division, including a full matchday for the First Division on 2 September 1939. After the suspension of football, friendlies were quickly set up between regional teams.

Decisions as to whether the game should go on were connected to debates about wartime morale as football had a positive effect on the well-being of the public. The Football Association had no clear precedent from World War I, as football had continued through the 1914/15 season. The British government announced on 21 September 1939 that football games would continue but not under the divisions that the game traditionally held season to season. Games began in October.

The Football Association established a fifty-mile travelling limit. The Football League was separate regional leagues, flattening previous division statuses, with reduced attendance numbers. In the interests of public safety, the number of spectators allowed to attend these games was limited to 8,000. These arrangements were later revised, and clubs were allowed gates of 15,000 from tickets purchased on the day of the game through the turnstiles.

Many footballers during this time left their careers to join the Territorial Army. Between September 1939 and the end of the war, 784 footballers joined in the war effort. 91 men joined from Wolverhampton Wanderers, 76 from Liverpool, 65 from Huddersfield Town, 63 from Leicester City, 62 from Charlton, 55 from Preston North End, 52 from Burnley, 50 from Sheffield Wednesday, 44 from Chelsea, 41 each from Brentford and Southampton, Sunderland and West Ham United, and 1 from Norwich City.

Because of the number of footballers who had joined the services, the FA introduced the guest player system. Service personnel and war workers regularly moved around and teams changed significantly week to week. Young and inexperienced players also got their chance to feature for local clubs due to the shortage of experienced players.

=== 1939–40 ===
Each season saw the divisions switched around from region to region. The first season of the Wartime League 1939–40 season, saw eight divisions established, each with between eight and 12 clubs: South West, Midlands, East Midlands, West, North West, North East and two Southern sections, which were both played in two sections. Arsenal, Tottenham, Queens Park Rangers, and Crystal Palace were all winners of their own South section. The FA Cup was suspended and to substitute for its absence, the Football League War Cup was established.

By May 1940 the early stages of the conflict, known as the Phoney War, ended and Germany invaded France, bringing the war increasingly closer to Britain. Concerns for the safety of spectators increased as a result of the Luftwaffe's campaign of bombing. Despite this, over 40,000 fans braved the warnings and turned out at Wembley Stadium to see West Ham United lift the Football League War Cup by defeating Blackburn Rovers. On 19 September 1940, soon after the beginning of the Blitz, the Football Association relaxed their ban on Sunday football to provide recreation for war workers.

As early as 1939, the London clubs had called for a separate London division to be run underneath the London FA. They backed down, instead participating in the Football League's official divisions. However, the London Clubs broke with the Football League in organising the London War Cup. During the second half of 1939–40, the London clubs rejected the official Football League fixtures and organised their own, something they would repeat the following season.

Most of the London teams had not operated under the Football League umbrella during World War I, partially explaining their independent spirit during World War II. Arsenal manager George Allison and Tottenham director G. Wagstaffe Simmons both were significant figures in the breakaway movement.

=== 1940–41 ===
In 1940–1941, the leagues were reduced in numbers to just two: the North Regional League and the South Regional League. Crystal Palace were champions of the South and Preston North End were the North champions.

The London War Cup, organised by the London clubs, was first played in the spring of 1940–41. At the end of the 1940–41 season, London clubs once again organised their own competition schedule. The FA management committee publicly condemned them, but no further consequences commenced.

The West Ham chairman WJ Cearns worked to find a compromise between the London clubs and the rest of the team, but found no success. In early August 1941, all eleven London clubs and two of their Southern allies, Aldershot and Reading, were expelled from the Football League. Three further clubs - Brighton, Portsmouth, and Watford - joined the rebel league. Southend United withdrew from league competition.

=== 1941–42 ===
For 1941–1942, the two Football League competitions were renamed to League North and League South. The new London War League began their first season. The London clubs had argued that their plan was closely connected to the national war effort as it would reduce long-distance games and travel. However, they faced many of the same struggles as the Football League competitions including depleted teams, travel difficulties, and one-sided matches.

According to wartime sport scholar Matthew Taylor, the London Wartime League was "a qualified success." However, other regional teams suffered as the Football League South was extremely stretched geographically. Some Southern clubs played only five different teams.

At the end of the 1941–42 season, the Football League agreed to allow the London clubs back as long as they wrote a formal apology letter and paid a fine. The Football League still mostly acquiesced to the London clubs demands, instituting a slightly larger London League with two additional teams, renamed League South.

=== 1942–45 ===
In the summer of 1942, Bournemouth and Norwich withdrew from League competition for the rest of the war due to transportation and other difficulties. Southend United also remained outside the League.

From 1942 to 1945 the leagues were continued as three, now established as League North, League South (the expanded London League), League West, and now a League North Cup as opposed to the London War Cup. The Football League War Cup continued on in these years.

=== Post-war ===
Following the surrender of Germany in May 1945 and the end of the war in Europe, The Wartime League's structure continued for one more season from 1945–1946 with just the League North and League South. This season however marked the retirement of the Football League War Cup and the return of the FA Cup with a new structure; seeing home and away leg ties for the first time in its history with results being decided on aggregate goals and extra-time, followed by a replay.

In 1946–1947, the league was then returned to pre-war four divisions, First Division, Second Division and Division 3 with its north–south split.

== Career debuts ==
Centre forward Jackie Milburn made his career debut in the Wartime Football League for Newcastle United in 1943, scoring a total of 38 goals in the next three years of the league's life, going on to become a goal-scoring legend for both club and country thereafter.

Welsh winger George Edwards made his professional debut for Birmingham City in the Wartime League 1944–45 football season, winning the Football League South championship and reaching the semi-finals of the FA Cup in the League's final season.

== Highlights ==
The Wartime League produced very few memorable moments for fans of clubs who managed to play. The lack of availability for footballers to participate wore down the league's performance. Despite guest players being introduced, many teams still struggled to produce a full squad and resigned many matches. League table points were often added up by goal average or appearances as opposed to match results.

The Blitz was still taking place when the 1941 Football League War Cup Final took place at Wembley on 31 May. Preston North End and Arsenal drew 1–1 in front of a 60,000 crowd. Preston won the replay at Blackburn, 2–1. Robert Beattie got both of Preston's goals.

Wolves won the Football League War Cup in 1942, beating Sunderland 4–1. The team featured a player named Eric Robinson, who was killed during a military training exercise soon afterwards.

In the 1940–1941 season Preston North End needed to win their last game against Liverpool to win the North Regional League title. The nineteen-year-old Andrew McLaren scored all six goals for Preston in the 6–1 victory.

In 1945, Chelsea faced Millwall in the final of the Southern Football League War Cup at Wembley Stadium. The crowd of 90,000 was the highest attendance for a club match during the war. King George VI and the future Elizabeth II were among those in attendance.

== Controversies ==
=== Football during a World War ===
The prospect of large gatherings of crowds during an ongoing major war, especially in light of air raids over major cities, proved to be incredibly controversial. During the first season of The Football Wartime League, the British mainland had not experienced any bombings by Germany. While public attendance was reduced, fears of Britain's safety were moderate. Despite the end of the Phoney War and the beginning of attacks on France and Britain, games continued to be played and even saw an increase in attendance and match fixtures during the Blitz. The government stood by its decision and claimed these games were recreation for war workers.

Many war workers and guest players who played these games however supported the wartime league, claiming it allowed them an outlet from the war.

=== Player statistics ===
Total records of goals and appearances during the Wartime League have been ignored in respective career and league statistics, allowing players post-World War II to go higher than some of them in goal-scoring and appearance rankings.

Many critics do not acknowledge the wartime league as counting for career goals and appearances. The original invention of the Wartime Football League stated that the matches were to be regarded as friendlies. Friendly matches are not included in record terms for any team or player. Despite leagues being established in this time, the number of Guest players, one-off appearances, resignations of teams from fixtures leading to adding up goal difference and appearances to go up the table, leads to many seeing these records as inaccurate, unfair, or unnecessary. Majority of fan-based arguments debate that a player who exceeds one's record through their wartime matches should nonetheless be seen as the club's highest goal scorer or appearance having been part of the team's squad even if only for a short time.

A notable argument relates to the goal-difference between Jackie Milburn's and Alan Shearer’s Newcastle United goal-scoring records. When counting Jackie's wartime matches, he scored a total of 238 professional goals for Newcastle United FC. In May 2005, Alan Shearer finished his career at 206 goals. He has since been defined as the club's highest ever goal scorer. The wartime league's exclusion from Jackie's United record sees him taken down to 200 goals. It has been debated among the Newcastle United fans that Shearer should be quoted as second to Milburn in this respect. The official website of NUFC acknowledged Milburn's war record of an additional 38 goals, but his family have publicly supported Shearer's status and have not debated his achievement.

== See also ==
- Association football during World War II
