= Douglas Hunt (footballer) =

English footballer (1914–1989)

Doug Hunt
Personal information
- Full name: Douglas Arthur Hunt
- Date of birth: 19 May 1914
- Place of birth: Shipton Bellinger, England
- Date of death: 30 May 1989 (aged 75)
- Place of death: Yeovil, England
- Height: 5 ft 7 1/2 in (1.71 m)
- Position: Centre forward

Youth career
- ?–1934: Winchester City

Senior career*
Years	Team	Apps	(Gls)
1934–1937	Tottenham Hotspur	17	(6)
1937–1938	Barnsley	36	(18)
1938–1946	Sheffield Wednesday	42	(30)
1943–1944	→ Brentford (guest)		(18)
1946–1948	Leyton Orient	61	(16)
Total		156	(70)

Managerial career
- 1948–1953: Gloucester City
- 1954–1958: Tonbridge
- * Club domestic league appearances and goals

Douglas 'Doug' Hunt (19 May 1914 – 30 May 1989) was a British professional footballer whose career lasted from 1934 to 1948. Hunt was a centre forward who played for Tottenham Hotspur, Barnsley, Sheffield Wednesday and Leyton Orient. Hunt lost some of his best years as a footballer to World War II being only 25 when war was declared. In his 14-year career he made 169 appearances including cup ties and scored 73 goals. Hunt holds a special place in the annals of Sheffield Wednesday being the only player in their history to score six goals in a competitive match. On retiring from playing, Hunt was a manager and a coach in non-league football for 38 years.

== Playing career ==
Hunt was born in the small Hampshire village of Shipton Bellinger. His football career started in the early 1930s in the Hampshire League with Winchester City where he took over the centre forward's shirt after Ted Drake had left to start his league career at Southampton. Hunt's ability as a goalscorer was spotted by Tottenham Hotspur and he signed for the north London club in March 1934.

=== Tottenham Hotspur ===
Hunt was initially assigned to play for Tottenham's nursery side Northfleet United and did not make his Tottenham debut until Christmas Day 1934 in a 3–0 away defeat at Grimsby Town. Hunt made 12 appearances that season scoring 4 goals as Tottenham struggled and were eventually relegated from Division One at the end of the 1934–35 campaign. In his three seasons at Tottenham, Hunt never found himself as an automatic choice finding himself behind George Hunt and then Johnny Morrison in the pecking order for first choice centre forward. He had an excellent record for Tottenham's reserve team, scoring 56 goals in 74 matches and in March 1937 he signed for Second Division Barnsley for a fee of £1700 in an effort to get regular first team football.

=== Barnsley ===
Hunt stayed at Barnsley for a year, the 1937–38 season saw the team in a relegation struggle but Hunt's form was good scoring 15 goals in 29 appearances and in March 1938 he became Jimmy McMullan's first signing for Sheffield Wednesday for a fee of £3875.

=== Sheffield Wednesday ===
Hunt exchanged one relegation battle for another as Wednesday were also down near the bottom of the Second Division. He made his debut on 5 March 1938 against Manchester United and played in all the remaining 12 league games that season, scoring six goals as he provided a remedy for Wednesday's problem centre forward position which had been bothering them all season. He also took over from Horace Burrows as club penalty taker. Some of his goals were vital, he scored the winner at Nottingham Forest, then scored a vital brace in Wednesday's penultimate match of the season, a 2–1 home victory against Burnley which lifted the team out of the bottom three. He then scored the winner in the following Saturday's 2–1 win at Tottenham to ensure safety.

The 1938–39 season saw Wednesday involved in a thrilling promotion chase which saw them miss out on promotion by one point. Hunt had a fine season scoring 26 League goals in 30 appearances and finishing as club top scorer for the campaign. However it is the match against Norwich City on 19 November 1938 which has left Hunt with a unique place in Sheffield Wednesday history.

==== "Hunt's game" - six goals in one match ====
Despite their high finish, Wednesday had a slow start to the 1938–39 campaign, being well down the League in 14th place before the visit of Norwich, they had lost heavily 5–1 at West Brom the previous Saturday. Hunt however was bang in form having scored four goals in a Sheffield and Hallamshire County Cup semi-final tie 12 days earlier against Rotherham United. There were three main factors why Wednesday had such a crushing 7–0 victory on that day, firstly Norwich had a terrible away record having failed to pick up a single point on their travels. Secondly, Wednesday's England international inside right Jackie Robinson had one of his finest games for the club and created five of the six goals that Doug Hunt scored. Thirdly, Norwich's centre half Peter Burke was injured after 15 minutes and was a "passenger" for the rest of the game on the left wing. With no substitutes allowed, this left the Wednesday forwards and Hunt in particular with plenty of room.

Hunt missed an easy chance in Wednesday's first attack but within two minutes of Burke's injury he had put Wednesday one up. After 25 minutes he scored a second when he beat Norwich's offside trap and ran on to beat keeper Harry Dukes. Hunt completed a hat-trick six minutes before half time after picking up a pass from Robinson and shooting home from the edge of the penalty area, he then added his and the team's fourth a minute before the break. Hunt's fifth came after 65 minutes when he connected with Willie Fallon's corner, hitting the post but reacting quickly to knock in the rebound. Fallon scored Wednesday's sixth goal after 80 minutes and with three minutes remaining Hunt scored his sixth and Wednesday's seventh to create a new individual goal scoring record in a competitive match for Sheffield Wednesday.

== Wartime ==
Hunt played in the first three matches of the 1939–40 season before official football was suspended because of World War II. During the war he returned to his home county of Hampshire and joined the army. He made guest appearances for Brentford, Tottenham Hotspur, Aldershot, Fulham and West Ham winning the London War Cup with Brentford in 1942. He returned to Brentford for the 1943–44 season, top-scoring with 18 goals and netting a total of 86 goals in 167 games for the Bees. He returned to Sheffield after leaving the army and played five games for Wednesday in the wartime league of 1945–46. He was put on the transfer list in February 1946 and accepted the post of player-coach at Leyton Orient in April of that year with a transfer fee of £620 changing hands.

== Latter career ==
He had a good first season with Leyton Orient (1946–47) scoring 13 League goals in 39 appearances, finishing joint top scorer with Wally Pullen as Orient finished in the bottom half of Division Three South. For the following campaign he was appointed assistant-manager but still put in 22 appearances for the first team at inside right. He left Orient to become manager at Gloucester City between 1948 and 1953 before moving to Tonbridge in January 1954 whom he took to two Southern League Cup finals in 1955 and 1957. He also signed Ron Saunders for Tonbridge in July 1956 starting him on the road to becoming a top player and manager. In 1958 he moved to Yeovil Town as trainer-coach staying there for more than 25 years, being granted a Testimonial match in 1976, before retiring in 1986, aged 72. Doug Hunt died on 30 May 1989, aged 75 in Yeovil.

== Honours ==
Brentford

- London War Cup: 1941–42
