= Horace Rickett =

English footballer

Personal information
- Full name: Horace Francis John Rickett
- Date of birth: 3 January 1912
- Place of birth: Orsett, England
- Date of death: January 1989 (aged 76–77)
- Place of death: Colchester, England
- Position: Goalkeeper

Senior career*
Years	Team	Apps	(Gls)
1934–1936	Millwall		
1936–	Tilbury		
- Chelmsford City
1940–1943	Southend United		
1943–1945	Leyton Orient		
1945–1946	Fulham	0	(0)
1946	Chelmsford City		
1946–1948	Reading	22	(0)
- Tonbridge
- * Club domestic league appearances and goals

Horace Francis John Rickett (3 January 1912 – January 1989), sometimes known as Harry Rickett, was an English professional footballer who played as a goalkeeper in the Football League for Reading.

== Career statistics ==
Appearances and goals by club, season and competition
Club	Season	League			FA Cup		Total	
Club	Season	Division	Apps	Goals	Apps	Goals	Apps	Goals
Fulham	1945–46	―			2	0	2	0
Career total			0	0	2	0	2	0
