= Wally Pullen =

English footballer

Personal information
- Full name: Walter Ernest Pullen
- Date of birth: 2 August 1919
- Place of birth: Ripley, England
- Date of death: 1977 (aged 58)
- Place of death: Luton, England
- Height: 5 ft 10 1/4 in (1.78 m)
- Position: Inside forward

Senior career*
Years	Team	Apps	(Gls)
1944–1946	Fulham	0	(0)
1946–1950	Leyton Orient	117	(37)
1950–1953	Gloucester City		
- Dunstable Town

Managerial career
- Dunstable Town (player-manager)
- * Club domestic league appearances and goals

Walter Ernest Pullen (2 August 1919 – 1977) was an English professional footballer who made over 110 appearances in the Football League for Leyton Orient as an inside forward.

== Personal life ==
Pullen served in the Queen's Royal Regiment (West Surrey) during the Second World War.
