= Jock Purdie =

English footballer

Personal information
- Full name: James John Purdie
- Date of birth: 24 May 1918
- Place of birth: Berwick-upon-Tweed, England
- Date of death: 29 February 1988 (aged 69)
- Place of death: Margate, England
- Position: Goalkeeper

Senior career*
Years	Team	Apps	(Gls)
1939–1940	Bradford (Park Avenue)		
1945–1946	Airdrieonians		
1946–1948	Millwall	50	(0)
1948–1949	Kilmarnock	10	(0)
1949	Southport	6	(0)
1949–1950	Tonbridge	43	(0)
1950–	Aldershot	16	(0)
- Chelmsford City
- * Club domestic league appearances and goals

James John Purdie (24 May 1918 – 29 February 1988) was an English professional footballer who played in the Football League for Millwall, Aldershot and Southport as a goalkeeper. He also played in the Scottish League for Kilmarnock and Airdrieonians.

== Career statistics ==
Appearances and goals by club, season and competition
Club	Season	League			National cup (Note: Includes FA Cup, Scottish Cup)		League cup (Note: Includes Scottish League Cup)		Other		Total	
Club	Season	Division	Apps	Goals	Apps	Goals	Apps	Goals	Apps	Goals	Apps	Goals
Millwall	1946–47	Second Division	31	0	1	0	—		—		32	0
Millwall	1947–48	Second Division	19	0	0	0	—		—		19	0
Millwall	Total		50	0	1	0	—		—		51	0
Kilmarnock	1948–49	Scottish Second Division	10	0	0	0	3	0	—		13	0
Southport	1948–49	Third Division North	7	0	—		—		1 (Note: Appearance in Liverpool Senior Cup)	0	8	0
Tonbridge	1949–50	Southern League	41	0	2	0	—		11 (Note: 5 appearances in Kent Senior Cup, 4 appearances in Southern League Cup, 2 appearances in Kent Senior Shield)	0	54	0
Tonbridge	1950–51	Southern League	2	0	1	0	—		—		3	0
Tonbridge	Total		43	0	3	0	—		11	0	57	0
Career total			110	0	4	0	3	0	12	0	129	0
