= Sam Briddon =

English footballer

Personal information
- Full name: Samuel Briddon
- Date of birth: 26 July 1915
- Place of birth: Alfreton, England
- Date of death: June 1975 (aged 59)
- Place of death: Mansfield, England
- Height: 6 ft 0 in (1.83 m)
- Position: Right half

Senior career*
Years	Team	Apps	(Gls)
- Teversal
- Stanton Hill
1933–1935	Port Vale	0	(0)
1935–1939	Brentford	6	(0)
1939	Swindon Town	0	(0)
1939–1946	Swansea Town	18	(0)
- → Bolton Wanderers (guest)
1944	→ West Ham United (guest)	1	(0)
1944	→ Brentford (guest)	5	(0)
- * Club domestic league appearances and goals

Samuel Briddon (26 July 1915 – June 1975) was an English professional footballer who played as a right half in the Football League for Swansea Town and Brentford.

== Personal life ==
After he retired from football in 1946, Briddon became a miner.

== Career statistics ==
Appearances and goals by club, season and competition
Club	Season	League			FA Cup		Total	
Club	Season	Division	Apps	Goals	Apps	Goals	Apps	Goals
Brentford	1938–39	First Division	6	0	1	0	7	0
Swansea Town	1945–46	—			2	0	2	0
Swansea Town	1946–47	Second Division	18	0	0	0	18	0
Swansea Town	Total		18	0	2	0	20	0
Career total			24	0	3	0	27	0
