= Tom Peacock =

English footballer

Personal information
- Full name: Thomas Peacock
- Date of birth: 14 September 1912
- Place of birth: Morton, England
- Height: 5 ft 10 in (1.78 m)
- Position: Inside left

Youth career
- 1930–1932: Nottingham University

Senior career*
Years	Team	Apps	(Gls)
1931	Chesterfield	0	(0)
- Bath City
- Melton Mowbray
- Matlock
1933–1945	Nottingham Forest	109	(57)
- → Chelsea (guest)
1942	→ Brentford (guest)	1	(0)
- * Club domestic league appearances and goals

Thomas Peacock was an English professional footballer who made over 100 appearances in the Football League for Nottingham Forest as an inside left. He also played cricket.

== Personal life ==
Peacock attended Tupton Hall School and the University of Nottingham and trained to be a teacher. He began his teaching career in Somerset and following his football career, he became headmaster of St Edmunds C of E Primary School in Mansfield Woodhouse.

== Career statistics ==
Appearances and goals by club, season and competition
Club	Season	League			FA Cup		Total	
Club	Season	Division	Apps	Goals	Apps	Goals	Apps	Goals
Nottingham Forest	1933–34	Second Division	15	7	3	4	18	11
Nottingham Forest	1934–35	Second Division	36	21	4	0	40	21
Nottingham Forest	1935–36	Second Division	29	20	2	1	31	21
Nottingham Forest	1936–37	Second Division	7	3	0	0	7	3
Nottingham Forest	1937–38	Second Division	8	3	1	0	9	3
Nottingham Forest	1938–39	Second Division	14	3	1	0	15	3
Career total			109	57	12	5	131	62
