= Jimmy Harrison (footballer) =

English footballer

Personal information
- Full name: James Charles Harrison
- Date of birth: 12 February 1921
- Place of birth: Leicester, England
- Date of death: 19 July 2004 (aged 83)
- Place of death: Leicester, England
- Position: Left back

Senior career*
Years	Team	Apps	(Gls)
–1941	Wellington Victoria		
1946–1949	Leicester City	81	(1)
1949–1950	Aston Villa	8	(1)
1951–1953	Coventry City	20	(2)
- Corby Town
- Hinckley Athletic
Total		109	(4)
- * Club domestic league appearances and goals

James Charles Harrison (2 February 1921 – 19 July 2004) was an English professional footballer who played as a left back in the Football League for Aston Villa, Coventry City and Leicester City.

== Career statistics ==
Appearances and goals by club, season and competition
Club	Season	League			FA Cup		Total	
Club	Season	Division	Apps	Goals	Apps	Goals	Apps	Goals
Leicester City	1946–47	Second Division	10	1	5	0	15	1
Leicester City	1947–48	Second Division	37	0	1	0	38	0
Leicester City	1948–49	Second Division	34	0	5	1	39	1
Leicester City	Total		81	1	11	1	92	2
Aston Villa	1949–50	First Division	8	1	0	0	8	1
Coventry City	1951–52	Second Division	12	0	3	0	15	0
Coventry City	1952–53	Third Division South	8	2	0	0	8	2
Coventry City	Total		20	2	3	0	23	2
Career total			109	4	14	1	123	5

== Honours ==
Leicester City

- FA Cup runner-up: 1948–49
