= Len Townsend =

English footballer (1917–1997)

Personal information
- Full name: Leonard Francis Townsend
- Date of birth: 31 August 1917
- Place of birth: Brentford, England
- Date of death: August 1997 (aged 79–80)
- Place of death: Seaford, England
- Position: Inside right

Youth career
- Isleworth Town

Senior career*
Years	Team	Apps	(Gls)
1935–1937	Hayes	52	(64)
1937–1947	Brentford	33	(12)
1940	→ Plymouth Argyle (guest)	7	(10)
1940–1941	→ Leeds United (guest)	11	(11)
- → Belfast Celtic (guest)
1946	→ Colchester United (guest)	1	(3)
1947–1949	Bristol City	74	(45)
1949–1950	Millwall	5	(1)
1950–1952	Guildford City		
1953–1954	Ashford Town	17	(5)

International career
1943	Irish League XI	1	(1)

Managerial career
- 1952–1953: Hayes
- 1954–1958: Maidenhead United
- 1958–1961: Slough Town
- 1964–1969: Maidenhead United
- * Club domestic league appearances and goals

Leonard Francis Townsend (31 August 1917 – August 1997) was an English professional footballer who made over 110 Football League appearances, either side of the Second World War, for Brentford, Bristol City and Millwall as an inside right. He later became a manager in non-League football, serving Hayes, Slough Town and in two spells, Maidenhead United. Townsend's achievements with Maidenhead United saw him inducted into the club's Hall of Fame in 2005.

== Playing career ==
=== Hayes ===
An inside right, Townsend joined Athenian League club Hayes from Isleworth Town as a 17-year-old in 1935. He had a prolific two seasons in front of goal for the club, scoring 64 goals in 52 appearances. He departed Church Road at the end of the 1936–37 season.

=== Brentford ===
Townsend initially joined hometown First Division club Brentford as an amateur during the second half of the 1936–37 season and signed a professional contract at the end of the campaign. He spent the 1937–38 season in the club's reserve team and scored 19 goals in his first 15 London Combination appearances. With the first team struggling in the First Division during the first half of the 1938–39 season, manager Harry Curtis gave Townsend his professional debut for a match versus Huddersfield Town on Christmas Eve 1938 and he scored the winner in a 2–1 victory. The subsequent signing of Tommy Cheetham limited Townsend's chances of making a breakthrough into the first team, but he finished the 1938–39 season with four goals in five appearances.

The break-out of the Second World War in September 1939 saw competitive football suspended for the duration of the war. During the war, Townsend scored 102 goals in 120 appearances, a record which included four hat-tricks and one double hat-trick. He also guested for a number of clubs and returned to Football League action in the 1946–47 season, scoring 9 goals in 33 games in a disastrous campaign, which saw the Bees relegated to the Second Division. Townsend departed Brentford in May 1947, after making 41 appearances and scoring 14 goals in competitive matches while at Griffin Park.

=== Bristol City ===
Townsend and Brentford teammates Dai Hopkins and Frank Clack signed for Third Division South club Bristol City in June 1947. He had a happy two seasons with the club, scoring 50 goals in 80 appearances and topping the Third Division South goalscoring charts in his first season. He formed a formidable goalscoring partnership with Don Clark, though the pair's exploits failed to bring any success in the league.

=== Millwall ===
Townsend joined Third Division South club Millwall in July 1949 and made just five appearances and scored one goal during the 1949–50 season.

=== Non-League football ===
Townsend dropped into non-League football and signed for Southern League club Guildford City in 1950, a move which reunited him with his former Bristol City manager Bob Hewison. He departed the club in 1952, after helping the Sweeney to two successive Southern League Cup finals. His final season as a player came in 1953–54 with Kent League club Ashford Town.

== Representative career ==
While guesting for Belfast Celtic, Townsend appeared for the Irish League representative team in a match against their League of Ireland counterparts on 26 April 1943. He scored in the 2–2 draw.

== Managerial and coaching career ==
=== Guildford City ===
While a player with Guildford City, Townsend combined his playing duties with that of first team coach.

=== Hayes ===
Townsend returned to Hayes as manager in 1952, taking over from former Brentford teammate George Wilkins. He presided over a mediocre 1952–53 Athenian League campaign, before being replaced by Wilkins.

=== Ashford Town ===
Townsend had a spell as assistant manager of Ashford Town during the 1953–54 season.

=== Maidenhead United ===
Townsend was appointed manager of Corinthian League club Maidenhead United in 1954. He presided over the first period of success in the club's history, winning two Berks & Bucks Senior Cups, the Corinthian League Memorial Shield and the league title in his final season with the club. Townsend departed the Magpies in 1958.

=== Slough Town ===
Townsend joined Corinthian League club Slough Town as manager in 1958. With a number of his former Maidenhead United players in his squad, Townsend had a frustrating time with the club, failing to challenge in the league and finishing as runners up in the Berks & Bucks Benevolent Cup in 1959–60, though he managed to win the Southern Combination Cup in 1958–59. After finishing bottom of the Corinthian League in the 1960–61 season, Townsend was released as manager.

=== Return to Maidenhead United ===
Townsend rejoined Maidenhead United as manager in 1964. Now managing at Athenian League Premier Division level, Townsend failed to manage the Magpies to success in the league, though he won his third Berks & Bucks Senior Cup with the club in 1966. He resigned in 1969 and was honoured with a place in the club's Hall of Fame in 2005. As of September 2014, Townsend's 473 matches in charge of Maidenhead is more than any other of the club's managers.

== Personal life ==
Townsend served for six years with the Duke of Cornwall's Light Infantry during and after the Second World War. After retiring from football, Townsend was a London-based sales representative for both Carborundum and Tex Abrasives before retiring in May 1982. Townsend lived in Seaford before his death in 1997.

== Honours ==
=== As a manager ===
Maidenhead United

- Corinthian League (1): 1957–58
- Berks & Bucks Senior Cup (3): 1955–56, 1956–57, 1965–66
- Corinthian League Memorial Shield (1): 1956–57

Slough Town

- Southern Combination Cup (1): 1958–59

=== As an individual ===
- Maidenhead United Hall of Fame

== Career statistics ==
Appearances and goals by club, season and competition
Club	Season	League			FA Cup		Other		Total	
Club	Season	Division	Apps	Goals	Apps	Goals	Apps	Goals	Apps	Goals
Brentford	1938–39	First Division	4	4	1	0	—		5	4
Brentford	1945–46	—			3	1	—		3	1
Brentford	1946–47	First Division	29	8	4	1	—		33	9
Brentford	Total		33	12	8	2	—		41	14
Colchester United (guest)	1945–46	Southern League	1	3	—		—		1	3
Millwall	1949–50	Third Division South	5	1	0	0	—		5	1
Ashford Town	1953–54	Kent League	17	5	3	3	4 (Note: two appearances and one goal in Kent Senior Shield, one appearance and one goal in Kent Senior Cup, one appearance and one goal in Kent League Cup)	3	24	11
Career total			56	21	11	5	4	3	71	29
