= 1940–41 in English football =

Football in England
- Season: 1940–41

Men's football
- Football League: not held
- FA Cup: not held

The 1940–41 season was the second season of special wartime football in England during the Second World War.

== Honours ==
League competition was split into two regional leagues, one North and one South. Teams played as many fixtures as was feasible, and winners were decided on goal average rather than points.

Competition	Winner
North Regional League	Preston North End
South Regional League	Crystal Palace
Football League War Cup	Preston North End
London War Cup	Reading
Lancashire War Cup	Manchester United

== Representative matches ==
A Football League XI defeated an All-British XI 9-7 in Liverpool on the 19th of April, 1941.

== See also ==
- England national football team results (unofficial matches)
