= Vic Aicken =

Northern Irish soccer player

Personal information
- Full name: Albert Victor Aicken
- Date of birth: 29 October 1914
- Place of birth: Belfast, Ireland
- Date of death: 1972 (aged 57–58)
- Place of death: Fulham, England
- Position: Right half

Senior career*
Years	Team	Apps	(Gls)
- Glentoran
1937–1943	Brentford	3	(0)
1941–1944	→ Clapton Orient (guest)		
1942	→ West Ham United (guest)		
1942	→ Watford (guest)		
- → Reading (guest)
- * Club domestic league appearances and goals

Albert Victor Aicken (29 October 1914 – 1972) was a Northern Irish professional footballer who played in the Football League for Brentford as a right half.

== Career ==
Aicken began his career in his native Northern Ireland with Glentoran, before joining English First Division club Brentford for a £1,000 fee prior to the beginning of the 1937–38 season. He failed to force centre half Joe James from his position and spent much of his time with the Bees in the reserve team. Aicken made three appearances for Brentford, at left and right half. The outbreak of the Second World War in August 1939 ultimately ended Aicken's professional career. He guested for Clapton Orient, West Ham United, Watford and Reading during the war, but remained with Brentford until making his final appearances during the 1942–43 season. He then returned to Northern Ireland.

== Career statistics ==
Appearances and goals by club, season and competition
Club	Season	League			FA Cup		Total	
Club	Season	Division	Apps	Goals	Apps	Goals	Apps	Goals
Brentford	1938–39	First Division	3	0	0	0	3	0
Career total			3	0	0	0	3	0

== Honours ==
Glentoran

- Irish Cup: 1934–35
