= Joe James (footballer) =

English footballer (1910–1993)

- James while with Brentford during the 1930s.

Personal information
- Full name: Joseph James
- Date of birth: 13 January 1910
- Place of birth: Battersea, England
- Date of death: January 1993 (aged 82–83)
- Height: 6 ft 1 in (1.85 m)
- Position: Centre half

Youth career
- Battersea Church

Senior career*
Years	Team	Apps	(Gls)
1929–1944	Brentford	240	(2)
1945–1946	Colchester United	9	(0)
Total		249	(2)
- * Club domestic league appearances and goals

Joseph James (13 January 1910 – January 1993) was an English professional footballer who played in the Football League for Brentford as a centre half.

In 2013, James placed third in a Football League 125th Anniversary poll of Brentford's best ever captains. He is a member of the Brentford Hall of Fame and made over 250 appearances for the club.

== Career ==
=== Early years ===
Born in Battersea, James began playing football as a youth for local club Battersea Church.

=== Brentford ===
James appeared in a friendly match for Third Division South club Brentford in August 1928 and impressed manager Harry Curtis. Though not awarded a contract, James became the assistant groundsman at the club's Griffin Park stadium. In August 1929, James was offered a contract and turned professional. Beginning life in the reserve team, he was a part of the team which won the London Combination title in the 1931–32 and 1932–33 seasons. Consistently behind Jimmy Bain in the pecking order, James made his debut for the club on 21 November 1931 in a 2–1 away win for the Bees over Brighton & Hove Albion. He made a further six appearances during the 1931–32 season and another five the following year.

With the Bees playing Second Division football for the 1933–34 season, James finally broke into the team, making 35 appearances and scoring his first goal for the club in a 4–1 away win over Oldham Athletic on 14 October 1933. James made 40 appearances and scored one goal during the 1934–35 season, a campaign in which the Bees won the Second Division championship (securing a place in the top-flight for the first time in the club's history) and the London Challenge Cup. James averaged just over 41 appearances a season in the First Division (many of them as captain) and was part of the team which finished fifth in 1935–36 (Brentford's highest-ever finish in the pyramid) and which topped the table for nearly half of the 1937–38 season. James' final professional appearance for the Bees came on 19 August 1939, in a 5–1 Football League Jubilee Fund defeat to Chelsea.

The outbreak of the Second World War in September 1939 saw competitive football suspended for the duration of hostilities. James remained with Brentford during the war and captained the team to the 1941–42 London War Cup, winning the trophy at the second time of asking. James played on until February 1944, when he retired after suffering a broken wrist in a 5–3 defeat to Charlton Athletic. He made 165 appearances for the Bees during the war. In a Football League 125th anniversary poll, James was ranked by the Bees supporters as the club's third best-ever captain and was one of the first inductees to the Brentford Hall of Fame in 1991.

=== Colchester United ===
After the war, James, now in his mid-thirties, signed for Colchester United of the Southern League. He made his debut on 17 November 1945 in a 3–1 away defeat to Hereford United and played his last game for the club on 2 February 1946, an 8–0 defeat at the hands of Bath City. He made a total of 9 appearances for Colchester.

== Personal life ==
James died in January 1993.

== Career statistics ==
Appearances and goals by club, season and competition
Club	Season	League			FA Cup		Other		Total	
Club	Season	Division	Apps	Goals	Apps	Goals	Apps	Goals	Apps	Goals
Brentford	1931–32	Third Division South	5	0	2	0	—		7	0
Brentford	1932–33	Third Division South	5	0	0	0	—		5	0
Brentford	1933–34	Second Division	34	1	1	0	—		35	1
Brentford	1934–35	Second Division	39	1	1	0	—		40	1
Brentford	1935–36	First Division	41	0	1	0	—		42	0
Brentford	1936–37	First Division	42	0	2	0	—		44	0
Brentford	1937–38	First Division	35	0	4	0	1 (Note: Appearance in Empire Exhibition Trophy)	0	40	0
Brentford	1938–39	First Division	39	0	1	0	—		40	0
Brentford	Total		240	2	12	0	1	0	253	2
Colchester United	1945–46	Southern League	9	0	—		—		9	0
Career total			249	2	12	0	1	0	262	6

== Honours ==
Brentford

- London Combination: 1931–32, 1932–33
- Football League Second Division: 1934–35
- London Challenge Cup: 1934–35
- London War Cup: 1941–42

Individual

- Brentford Hall of Fame
