= George Wilkins (footballer) =

English footballer

Ernest George Wilkins (27 October 1919 – January 1999) was a professional footballer and had four footballing sons, including the England International Ray Wilkins.

== Playing career ==
While working as a lorry boy, Wilkins played football for Hayes.

In 1938 he signed as a professional for Brentford. After making his First Division debut in January 1939 he played three League games before the Second World War. He continued to play for Brentford during the war, including at Wembley in the 1942 London Cup Final, when Brentford beat Portsmouth. He served in the Royal Kent Regiment. When the war ended, he continued with Brentford

Wilkins was sold in February 1947 for a fee of £7,000 to Bradford Park Avenue. In the following December he was sold to Nottingham Forest for £7,500. He moved to Leeds United in September 1949 where he played only three games.

In a career interrupted by the war, he played 83 league games and scored 19 goals for the four professional clubs. After his first coaching gig, he played in the Kent League for Dover in the 1952–53 season.

== Coaching career ==
In December 1949 Wilkins returned to Hayes as a coach. He was coach three times at Hayes until sacked in January 1961, when the players complained of his over-rigorous training methods.

== Personal life ==
George Wilkins was born in Hackney, East London.

Three of his sons, Graham, Ray and Dean Wilkins, played professional football, with Ray playing 84 times for England. Another son, Stephen, was signed by Chelsea and made one appearance for Brentford, before playing for a number of non-League teams, including Dagenham and Hayes.

He died in Bournemouth, Dorset, in January 1999. He was 79 years old.

== Honours ==
Brentford

- London War Cup: 1941–42
