= 1941–42 in English football =

Football in England
- Season: 1941–42

Men's football
- Football League: not held
- FA Cup: not held

The 1941–42 season was the third season of special wartime football in England during the Second World War.

== Overview ==
Between 1939 and 1946 normal competitive football was suspended in England. Many footballers signed up to fight in the war and as a result many teams were depleted, and fielded guest players instead. The Football League and FA Cup were suspended and in their place regional league competitions were set up. Appearances in these tournaments do not count in players' official records.

== Honours ==
League competition was split into two regional leagues, North and South. However the London clubs organised their own competitions. Teams played as many fixtures as was feasible, and winners were decided on point average rather than total.

Competition	Winner
League North	Blackpool (First Championship); Manchester United (Second Championship)
League South	Leicester City
London League	Arsenal
Football League War Cup	Wolverhampton Wanderers
London War Cup	Brentford

== See also ==
- England national football team results (unofficial matches)
