= John Jackson (footballer, born 1906) =

Scottish footballer (1906–1965)

Personal information
- Full name: John Jackson
- Date of birth: 29 November 1906
- Place of birth: Glasgow, Scotland
- Date of death: 12 June 1965 (aged 58)
- Place of death: Nova Scotia, Canada
- Height: 5 ft 9 in (1.75 m)
- Position: Goalkeeper

Senior career*
Years	Team	Apps	(Gls)
–1926	Kirkintilloch Rob Roy		
1926–1933	Partick Thistle	264	(0)
1933–1939	Chelsea	49	(0)
1939–1940	Guildford City		

International career
1929–1932	Scottish League XI	4	(0)
1931–1935	Scotland	8	(0)
- * Club domestic league appearances and goals

John Jackson (29 November 1906 – 12 June 1965) was a Scottish professional footballer who played as a goalkeeper; he made over 300 appearances in the Scottish League playing for Partick Thistle and the English Football League for Chelsea. in 1930s

== Career ==
At Partick, Jackson missed only two league games in his seven seasons at Firhill between 1926 and 1933, making a total of 334 appearances for the club in all competitions. He played for the Jags in the 1930 Scottish Cup Final which they lost to Rangers after a replay, but did manage to claim winner's medals in the Glasgow Merchants Charity Cup in 1927 and the one-off Glasgow Dental Hospital Cup in 1928, both against the same opponents.

Jackson was capped by Scotland at international level on eight occasions (four while with Partick, four with Chelsea) and represented the Scottish League XI four times.

== Personal life ==
After retiring from football, Jackson emigrated to Nova Scotia, Canada and became a professional golfer.

== Honours ==
Brentford

- London War Cup: 1941–42

== Career statistics ==
Appearances and goals by club, season and competition
Club	Season	League			National Cup		Total	
Club	Season	Division	Apps	Goals	Apps	Goals	Apps	Goals
Partick Thistle	1926–27	Scottish Division One	36	0	5	0	41	0
Partick Thistle	1927–28	Scottish Division One	38	0	4	0	42	0
Partick Thistle	1928–29	Scottish Division One	38	0	2	0	42	0
Partick Thistle	1929–30	Scottish Division One	38	0	7	0	45	0
Partick Thistle	1930–31	Scottish Division One	38	0	3	0	41	0
Partick Thistle	1931–32	Scottish Division One	38	0	4	0	42	0
Partick Thistle	1932–33	Scottish Division One	38	0	5	0	43	0
Partick Thistle	Total		264	0	30	0	294	0
Chelsea	1933–34	First Division	6	0	0	0	6	0
Chelsea	1934–35	First Division	27	0	2	0	29	0
Chelsea	1935–36	First Division	10	0	0	0	10	0
Chelsea	1936–37	First Division	1	0	0	0	1	0
Chelsea	1937–38	First Division	2	0	0	0	2	0
Chelsea	1938–39	First Division	3	0	0	0	3	0
Chelsea	Total		49	0	2	0	51	0
Career total			313	0	32	0	345	0
