= Harry Dukes =

English footballer

Personal information
- Full name: Harold Parkinson Dukes
- Date of birth: 31 March 1912
- Place of birth: Portsmouth, England
- Date of death: 13 August 1988 (aged 76)
- Place of death: Cambridge, England
- Height: 5 ft 10 1/2 in (1.79 m)
- Position: Goalkeeper

Senior career*
Years	Team	Apps	(Gls)
- Sleaford
- Martlesham
- Melton
- Orwell Works
1933–1934	Ipswich Town	12	(0)
1934–1938	Norwich City	105	(0)
1939	→ Norwich City (guest)		
1941–1943	→ Brentford (guest)	6	(0)
- → Fulham (guest)
- → Queens Park Rangers (guest)
1945–1946	→ Bedford Town (guest)	25	(0)
1946	Bedford Town		(0)
1946	Norwich City	13	(0)
- Guildford City
- Newmarket Town
- * Club domestic league appearances and goals

Harold Parkinson Dukes (31 March 1912 – 13 August 1988) was an English professional footballer who made over 115 appearances as a goalkeeper in the Football League for Norwich City.

== Career statistics ==
Appearances and goals by club, season and competition
Club	Season	League			FA Cup		Total	
Club	Season	Division	Apps	Goals	Apps	Goals	Apps	Goals
Ipswich Town	1933–34	Southern Amateur League	12	2	3	0	15	2
Career total			12	2	3	0	15	2
