= 1945–46 in English football =

Football in England
- Season: 1945–46

Men's football
- Football League: not held
- FA Cup: Derby County

The 1945–46 season was the 66th season of competitive football in England.

== Overview ==
1945–46 was the first peacetime football season since the 1939–40 season was cut short due to World War II. On 7 May (as the war was ending), it was announced that the FA Cup would be resumed, and that the 44 clubs in the top two divisions of the 1938–39 season would play in the Football League North and Football League South without promotion and relegation from the previous peacetime season. This arrangement was debated by the clubs over the following two months – with Wolverhampton Wanderers proposing an immediate return to a peacetime Football League as was to happen in France – before it was agreed at The Football League's annual meeting in London on 25 July that regional leagues should continue for one more season.

To make up for the lack of quality matches, all rounds in the season's FA Cup from round one up to and including the quarter-finals were made two-legged ties (rather than the traditional single matches) with the aggregate score determining who went through to the next round. Derby County eventually won the Cup.

From the next season, a full football programme was restored, including The Football League and international matches.

== Honours ==
Competition	Winner
FA Cup	Derby County (1)
Football League North	Sheffield United
Football League South	Birmingham City

Notes = Number in parentheses is the times that club has won that honour. * indicates new record for competition

== See also ==
- England national football team results (unofficial matches)
