= Football League North and South =

Wartime English association football competitions

The Football League North and Football League South divisions of the Football League were created temporarily for the League to continue through the Second World War while limiting the amount of movement that was required by teams. The leagues started in 1940; however there was only one full season, in 1945–46. Previous seasons were, in a sense, bit-part leagues with clubs only playing teams that were generally local. An example of this is that in the 1942 Football League North Leeds United played Middlesbrough, Gateshead, Newcastle United, Doncaster Rovers, Sunderland, Bradford Park Avenue, York City, Halifax Town and Huddersfield Town, which they played Home and Away in succession.

The two leagues consisted of all the members of The First and Second Divisions of the Football League split on a purely geographical basis. The 1945–46 full season was instituted as a precursor to the resumption of the previous divisional split in force prior to World War II. As the war had only just finished travel was sometimes difficult to arrange, many of the players were still away and the teams often included guests.

Sheffield United were the Champions of League North and Birmingham City were the Champions of League South for the only full season in 1945–46.

Results and players' contributions do not tend to be included in official statistics.

== 1945–46 season ==
=== North league table ===
Pos	Team	Pld	W	D	L	GF	GA	GR	Pts
1	Sheffield United	42	27	6	9	112	62	1.806	60
2	Everton	42	23	9	10	88	54	1.630	55
3	Bolton Wanderers	42	20	11	11	67	45	1.489	51
4	Manchester United	42	19	11	12	98	62	1.581	49
5	Sheffield Wednesday	42	20	8	14	67	60	1.117	48
6	Newcastle United	42	21	5	16	106	70	1.514	47
7	Chesterfield	42	17	12	13	68	49	1.388	46
8	Barnsley	42	17	11	14	76	68	1.118	45
9	Blackpool	42	18	9	15	94	92	1.022	45
10	Manchester City	42	20	4	18	78	75	1.040	44
11	Liverpool	42	17	9	16	80	70	1.143	43
12	Middlesbrough	42	17	9	16	75	87	0.862	43
13	Stoke City	42	18	6	18	88	79	1.114	42
14	Bradford	42	17	6	19	71	84	0.845	40
15	Huddersfield Town	42	17	4	21	90	89	1.011	38
16	Burnley	42	13	10	19	63	84	0.750	36
17	Grimsby Town	42	13	9	20	61	89	0.685	35
18	Sunderland	42	15	5	22	55	89	0.618	35
19	Preston North End	42	14	6	22	70	77	0.909	34
20	Bury	42	12	10	20	60	85	0.706	34
21	Blackburn Rovers	42	11	7	24	60	111	0.541	29
22	Leeds United	42	9	7	26	66	118	0.559	25

Source: rsssf.com

=== South league table ===
Pos	Team	Pld	W	D	L	GF	GA	GR	Pts
1	Birmingham City	42	28	5	9	96	45	2.133	61
2	Aston Villa	42	25	11	6	106	58	1.828	61
3	Charlton Athletic	42	25	10	7	92	45	2.044	60
4	Derby County	42	22	8	12	104	62	1.677	52
5	West Bromwich Albion	42	22	8	12	104	69	1.507	52
6	Wolverhampton Wanderers	42	20	11	11	75	48	1.563	51
7	West Ham United	42	20	11	11	94	76	1.237	51
8	Fulham	42	20	10	12	93	73	1.274	50
9	Tottenham Hotspur	42	22	3	17	78	81	0.963	47
10	Chelsea	42	16	11	15	76	73	1.041	43
11	Arsenal	42	16	11	15	76	73	1.041	43
12	Millwall	42	17	8	17	79	105	0.752	42
13	Coventry City	42	15	10	17	70	69	1.014	40
14	Brentford	42	14	10	18	82	72	1.139	38
15	Nottingham Forest	42	12	13	17	72	73	0.986	37
16	Southampton	42	14	9	19	97	105	0.924	37
17	Swansea Town	42	15	7	20	90	112	0.804	37
18	Luton Town	42	13	7	22	60	92	0.652	33
19	Portsmouth	42	11	6	25	66	87	0.759	28
20	Leicester City	42	8	7	27	57	101	0.564	23
21	Newport County	42	9	2	31	52	125	0.416	20
22	Plymouth Argyle	42	3	8	31	39	120	0.325	14

Source: rsssf.com and War Hammers II
