= London War Cup =

- Founded: 1940
- Region: England
- Current champions: Brentford FC
- Most championships: Reading, Brentford (1 title)

The London War Cup was an English football competition held during the Second World War. It was established to be a wartime replacement for the FA Cup, which had been suspended for the duration of the conflict. Although called the London War Cup, teams from across the south of England took part. The tournament only ran for two seasons and was abandoned in 1942 when it was merged into the newly-regionalised Football League War Cup as the Football League South Cup. The London War Cup trophy was retained as the trophy for the Football League South Cup. The trophy is still in the possession of the South Cup's last winners, Chelsea.

== Overview ==
In 1941, the 12 participating clubs were Aldershot, Arsenal, Brentford, Chelsea, Clapton Orient, Crystal Palace, Fulham, Millwall, Queens Park Rangers, Reading, Tottenham Hotspur and West Ham United. Charlton Athletic declined to enter. The applications of Portsmouth, Southend United and Luton Town were denied due to insufficient places. The opening round was a group stage played in a round robin format. Clubs would play every club in their group in home and away fixtures. The group stage comprised two groups of six; the group winners and runners-up advanced to the semi-finals. The 1941 final was staged at Stamford Bridge, Chelsea's home ground, with Reading beating Brentford by 3 goals to 2.

In 1942, the competition was increased to 16 teams by the addition of Brighton & Hove Albion, Portsmouth, Watford and Charlton. The format was changed to four groups of four, with the group winners advancing to the semi-finals. The semi-finals were single matches played at neutral venues in London. The 1942 final was held at Wembley Stadium on 30 May, with Brentford prevailing by 2 goals to nil over Portsmouth.

On 6 June 1942, Brentford faced Wolverhampton Wanderers, winners of the Football League War Cup, in a cup-winners play-off held at Stamford Bridge. The match ended 1–1 and was not replayed, so the clubs shared the honour.

== Finals ==
Season	Winner	Runners-up
1940–41	Reading	Brentford
1941–42	Brentford	Portsmouth
