= 1943–44 Brentford F.C. season =

English football team season

Brentford
1943–44 season
- Chairman: Frank Davis
- Manager: Harry Curtis
- Stadium: Griffin Park
- Football League South: 7th
- Football League South War Cup: Group stage
- Top goalscorer: League: Hunt (15); All: Hunt (18)
- Highest home attendance: 20,270
- Lowest home attendance: 2,340
- Average home league attendance: 25,768
Home colours

During the 1943–44 English football season, Brentford competed in the Football League South, due to the cessation of competitive football for the duration of the Second World War. The Bees marginally improved on the previous season's 9th-place finish, ending in 7th.

== Season summary ==
Brentford returned for the 1943–44 Football League South season again with a shortage of first team players, with just 10 available who made a senior appearance for the club prior to the outbreak of the Second World War in September 1939. The biggest boost for the squad came with the availability of goalkeeper Joe Crozier, who had not appeared since 21 October 1939. Reserve forwards Fred Durrant and Bob Thomas, signed before the war, would feature during the season, as would six junior and amateur players on the club's books. A whopping 36 guest players would be used during the campaign.

Despite an improved 7th-place finish in the Football League South, 1943–44 proved to be as forgettable as the previous season, though there were a few memorable results – 7–2 versus Southampton on 18 December 1943, 4–1 versus Arsenal in front of 20,270 at Griffin Park on 4 February 1944 and 8–0 versus Brighton & Hove Albion a month later in the group stage of the Football League War Cup, from which Brentford failed to qualify for the knockout stages. Three players won wartime international caps during the season – Les Smith for England, Joe Crozier for Scotland and Idris Hopkins for Wales. Though he finished the season as second-leading scorer behind guest Douglas Hunt, Les Smith's 15 goals in 15 appearances led his case for a first international cap in over two years.

The 1943–44 season ended with the retirements of two players who had contributed to Brentford's rise from the Third Division South to the First Division between 1932 and 1935. 34-year-old centre half Joe James elected to retire six months after failing to recover from a wrist injury suffered in the match versus Charlton Athletic on 26 February 1944. He would return to football briefly with Colchester United in November 1945. 35-year-old centre forward Jack Holliday, who moved to the half back line in his later years, retired at the end of the season, having scored 122 goals in 222 matches from his arrival in May 1932 to the outbreak of war in September 1939. He remained on the club's books as assistant trainer of the reserve team.

== League table ==
Pos	Team	Pld	W	D	L	GF	GA	GR	Pts
6	Portsmouth	30	16	5	9	68	59	1.153	37
7	Brentford	30	14	7	9	71	51	1.392	35
8	Chelsea	30	16	2	12	79	55	1.436	34

Source: Rec.Sport.Soccer Statistics Foundation

== Results ==
Brentford's goal tally listed first.

=== Legend ===
Win	Draw	Loss

=== Football League South ===
No.	Date	Opponent	Venue	Result	Attendance	Scorer(s)
1	28 August 1943	Clapton Orient	H	4–2	4,820	Hunt, Smith (2), Stewart
2	4 September 1943	Fulham	A	3–4	7,737	Stewart, Hunt (2)
3	11 September 1943	Brighton & Hove Albion	H	2–3	5,310	Hopkins, Hunt
4	18 September 1943	Chelsea	H	3–1	6,400	Smith, Hunt, Stewart
5	25 September 1943	Crystal Palace	A	1–1	5,131	W. Watson
6	2 October 1943	Watford	H	4–1	6,720	Durrant, Hunt (pen), McKennan (2)
7	9 October 1943	West Ham United	A	0–0	12,000	
8	16 October 1943	Arsenal	A	3–3	17,658	McKennan, Townsend, Hunt
9	23 October 1943	Aldershot	H	2–4	9,940	McKennan (2)
10	30 October 1943	Luton Town	A	2–2	5,000	Driver, McKennan
11	6 November 1943	Tottenham Hotspur	H	0–2	9,650	
12	13 November 1943	Portsmouth	H	2–0	6,880	Smith, Hunt (pen)
13	27 November 1943	Clapton Orient	A	4–1	1,000	Smith (2), Little, McKennan
14	4 December 1943	Fulham	H	0–0	7,510	
15	11 December 1943	Brighton & Hove Albion	A	2–0	2,500	Thomas, Stewart
16	18 December 1943	Southampton	H	7–2	3,000	Smith (2), Hunt (2), McKennan (2), Stewart
17	25 December 1943	Queens Park Rangers	H	2–5	11,200	Thomas, McKennan
18	27 December 1943	Queens Park Rangers	A	2–3	8,900	Smith, Stewart
19	1 January 1944	Chelsea	A	3–0	12,000	McKennan (2), Hunt
20	8 January 1944	Tottenham Hotspur	A	0–1	16,917	
21	22 January 1944	Watford	A	4–4	2,759	Hunt (2, 1 pen), W. Watson, McKennan
22	29 January 1944	West Ham United	H	2–1	11,220	Townsend, Hunt
23	5 February 1944	Arsenal	H	4–1	20,270	Soo, Westcott, Townsend (2)
24	12 February 1944	Aldershot	A	2–4	4,000	McKennan, Smith
25	1 April 1944	Luton Town	H	2–0	2,340	Hopkins, Baynham
26	10 April 1944	Crystal Palace	H	2–0	4,440	Stewart, Holliday
27	15 April 1944	Reading	H	1–0	6,040	Smith
28	22 April 1944	Southampton	A	2–2	9,000	Townsend, Stewart
29	29 April 1944	Portsmouth	A	2–3	8,000	Baynham, Townsend
30	6 May 1944	Reading	A	3–0	3,500	Townsend (2), Hunt

=== Football League South War Cup ===
Round	Date	Opponent	Venue	Result	Attendance	Scorer(s)
Grp	19 February 1944	Crystal Palace	H	3–4	4,110	Townsend, Stevens
Grp	26 February 1944	Charlton Athletic	A	3–5	5,023	Townsend, Hunt (2)
Grp	4 March 1944	Brighton & Hove Albion	H	8–0	5,020	Westcott (4), Townsend (3), Hunt
Grp	11 March 1944	Crystal Palace	A	2–1	8,659	Westcott, Shepherd
Grp	18 March 1944	Charlton Athletic	H	2–2	10,000	Townsend, Smith
Grp	25 March 1944	Brighton & Hove Albion	A	0–5	3,000	

- Source: 100 Years Of Brentford

== Playing squad ==
Players' ages are as of the opening day of the 1943–44 season.

Pos.	Name	Nat.	Date of birth (age)	Signed from	Signed in	Notes
Goalkeepers
GK	Joe Crozier	(Scotland)	2 December 1914 (aged 28)	East Fife	1937	
GK	Reg Saunders	(England)	29 July 1920 (aged 23)	Uxbridge Town	1944	Amateur
Defenders
DF	Buster Brown	(England)	6 September 1910 (aged 32)	Huddersfield Town	1937	
DF	Bernard Floodgate	(England)	22 July 1922 (aged 21)	Youth	1943	
DF	George Poyser	(England)	6 February 1910 (aged 33)	Port Vale	1934	
Midfielders
HB	Jack Holliday	(England)	19 December 1908 (aged 34)	Middlesbrough	1932	
HB	Joe James	(England)	13 January 1910 (aged 33)	Battersea Church	1929	
HB	Tom Manley	(England)	7 October 1912 (aged 30)	Manchester United	1939	Guest for Tottenham Hotspur
HB	Ernest Muttitt	(England)	24 July 1908 (aged 35)	Middlesbrough	1932	Guest for Brighton & Hove Albion, Chelsea, Crystal Palace, Fulham, Leyton Orient, Reading, Watford, West Ham United
Forwards
FW	Johnny Baynham	(Wales)	21 April 1918 (aged 25)	Youth	1944	
FW	Fred Durrant	(England)	19 June 1921 (aged 22)	Folkestone	1938	
FW	Idris Hopkins	(Wales)	11 October 1910 (aged 32)	Crystal Palace	1932	
FW	Maurice Richfield	(England)	October 1921 (aged 21)	Youth	1944	
FW	Les Smith	(England)	13 March 1918 (aged 25)	Petersham	1934	
FW	Bob Thomas	(England)	2 August 1919 (aged 24)	Golders Green	1939	
FW	Len Townsend	(England)	31 August 1917 (aged 25)	Hayes	1937	
Guest players
GK	Gordon Bentley	(England)	October 1920 (aged 22)	Burnley	1944	Guest from Burnley
GK	Charlie Briggs	(England)	4 April 1911 (aged 32)	Halifax Town	1943	Guest from Halifax Town
GK	Harry Dukes	(England)	31 March 1912 (aged 31)	Norwich City	1943	Guest from Norwich City
GK	Freddie Houldsworth	(England)	29 May 1911 (aged 32)	Reading	1944	Guest from Reading
GK	John Jones	(Wales)	25 November 1916 (aged 26)	Northampton Town	1943	Guest from Northampton Town
GK	Bill Mason	(England)	31 October 1908 (aged 34)	Queens Park Rangers	1944	Guest from Queens Park Rangers
GK	Alec Roxburgh	(England)	19 September 1910 (aged 32)	Blackpool	1944	Guest from Blackpool
DF	Ralph Cowan	(Scotland)	n/a	Rangers	1944	Guest from Rangers
DF	Frank Jenner	(Scotland)	n/a	St Mirren	1944	Guest from St Mirren
DF	Fred Lester	(England)	20 February 1911 (aged 32)	Sheffield Wednesday	1943	Guest from Sheffield Wednesday
DF	George Taylor	(England)	23 April 1909 (aged 34)	Bolton Wanderers	1943	Guest from Bolton Wanderers
HB	Len Jones	(England)	9 June 1913 (aged 30)	Plymouth Argyle	1943	Guest from Plymouth Argyle
HB	Duncan McKenzie	(Scotland)	10 August 1912 (aged 31)	Middlesbrough	1943	Guest from Middlesbrough
HB	David Nelson	(Scotland)	3 February 1918 (aged 25)	Arsenal	1943	Guest from Arsenal
HB	Frank Soo	(England)	12 March 1914 (aged 29)	Stoke City	1943	Guest from Stoke City
HB	Jack Watson	(Scotland)	31 December 1917 (aged 25)	Bury	1944	Guest from Bury
HB	Jimmy Watson	(England)	1 January 1914 (aged 29)	Bristol Rovers	1943	Guest from Bristol Rovers
HB	Bill Whittaker	(England)	20 December 1922 (aged 20)	Charlton Athletic	1943	Guest from Charlton Athletic
FW	Dickie Davis	(England)	22 January 1922 (aged 21)	Sunderland	1943	Guest from Sunderland
FW	Johnny Deakin	(Scotland)	15 May 1919 (aged 24)	St Mirren	1944	Guest from St Mirren
FW	Allenby Driver	(England)	29 September 1919 (aged 23)	Sheffield Wednesday	1943	Guest from Sheffield Wednesday
FW	Bobby Flavell	(Scotland)	1 September 1921 (aged 21)	Airdrieonians	1943	Guest from Airdrieonians
FW	Dickie Girling	(England)	24 May 1922 (aged 21)	Crystal Palace	1944	Guest from Crystal Palace
FW	Douglas Hunt	(England)	19 May 1914 (aged 29)	Sheffield Wednesday	1943	Guest from Sheffield Wednesday
FW	Tommy Kiernan	(Scotland)	20 October 1918 (aged 24)	Albion Rovers	1943	Guest from Albion Rovers
FW	Charlie Leyfield	(England)	30 October 1911 (aged 31)	Doncaster Rovers	1943	Guest from Doncaster Rovers
FW	George Little	(England)	1 December 1915 (aged 27)	Doncaster Rovers	1943	Guest from Doncaster Rovers
FW	Peter McKennan	(Scotland)	16 July 1918 (aged 25)	Partick Thistle	1943	Guest from Partick Thistle
FW	Ernie Shepherd	(England)	14 August 1919 (aged 24)	Fulham	1944	Guest from Fulham
FW	Arthur Stevens	(England)	13 January 1921 (aged 22)	Fulham	1944	Guest from Fulham
FW	George Stewart	(Scotland)	18 October 1920 (aged 22)	Hamilton Academical	1943	Guest from Hamilton Academical
FW	Harry Thompson	(England)	29 April 1915 (aged 28)	Sunderland	1943	Guest from Sunderland
FW	Dennis Westcott	(England)	2 July 1917 (aged 26)	Wolverhampton Wanderers	1944	Guest from Wolverhampton Wanderers

- Sources: Timeless Bees, Football League Players' Records 1888 to 1939, 100 Years Of Brentford

== Coaching staff ==
Name	Role
(England) Harry Curtis	Manager
(Scotland) Jimmy Bain	Assistant manager
(England) Bob Kane	Trainer
(England) Jack Cartmell	Assistant trainer

== Statistics ==
=== Appearances and goals ===

Brentford's highest appearance-makers in each position during the Football League South season.

Pos	Nat	Name	League		FL War Cup		Total	
Pos	Nat	Name	Apps	Goals	Apps	Goals	Apps	Goals
GK	(Scotland)	Joe Crozier	15	0	1	0	16	0
GK	(England)	Reg Saunders	3	0	1	0	4	0
DF	(England)	Buster Brown	30	0	5	0	35	0
DF	(England)	Bernard Floodgate	1	0	—		1	0
DF	(England)	George Poyser	24	0	6	0	30	0
HB	(England)	Jack Holliday	3	1	—		3	1
HB	(England)	Joe James	22	0	1	0	23	0
HB	(England)	Tom Manley	2	0	2	0	4	0
HB	(England)	Ernest Muttitt	8	0	3	0	11	0
FW	(Wales)	Johnny Baynham	2	2	—		2	2
FW	(England)	Fred Durrant	1	1	—		1	1
FW	(Wales)	Idris Hopkins	12	2	2	0	14	2
FW	(England)	Maurice Richfield	1	0	—		1	0
FW	(England)	Les Smith	21	12	4	1	25	13
FW	(England)	Bob Thomas	8	2	—		8	2
FW	(England)	Len Townsend	10	8	5	7	15	15
Players guested during the season
GK	(England)	Gordon Bentley	5	0	2	0	7	0
GK	(England)	Charlie Briggs	1	0	—		1	0
GK	(England)	Harry Dukes	4	0	—		4	0
GK	(England)	Freddie Houldsworth	—		1	0	1	0
GK	(Wales)	John Jones	2	0	—		2	0
GK	(England)	Bill Mason	1	0	—		1	0
GK	(England)	Alec Roxburgh	—		1	0	1	0
DF	(Scotland)	Ralph Cowan	—		1	0	1	0
DF	(Scotland)	Frank Jenner	1	0	—		1	0
DF	(England)	Fred Lester	1	0	—		1	0
DF	(England)	George Taylor	1	0	—		1	0
HB	(England)	Len Jones	1	0	—		1	0
HB	(Scotland)	Duncan McKenzie	18	0	—		18	0
HB	(Scotland)	David Nelson	5	0	—		5	0
HB	(England)	Frank Soo	12	1	3	0	15	1
HB	(England)	Jimmy Watson	14	2	6	0	20	2
HB	(Scotland)	Jack Watson	1	0	—		1	0
HB	(England)	Bill Whittaker	20	0	4	0	24	0
FW	(England)	Dickie Davis	2	0	—		2	0
FW	(Scotland)	Johnny Deakin	1	0	—		1	0
FW	(England)	Allenby Driver	1	1	—		1	1
FW	(Scotland)	Bobby Flavell	1	0	—		1	0
FW	(England)	Dickie Girling	1	0	—		1	0
FW	(England)	Douglas Hunt	26	15	4	3	30	18
FW	(Scotland)	Tommy Kiernan	4	0	—		4	0
FW	(England)	Charlie Leyfield	1	0	—		1	0
FW	(England)	George Little	2	1	—		2	1
FW	(Scotland)	Peter McKennan	18	14	2	0	20	14
FW	(England)	Ernie Shepherd	1	0	1	1	2	1
FW	(England)	Arthur Stevens	—		1	1	1	1
FW	(Scotland)	George Stewart	22	8	6	0	28	8
FW	(England)	Harry Thompson	1	0	—		1	0
FW	(England)	Dennis Westcott	1	1	4	5	5	6

- Players listed in italics left the club mid-season.
- Source: 100 Years Of Brentford

=== Goalscorers ===
Pos.	Nat	Player	FLS	FLC	Total
FW	(England)	Douglas Hunt	15	3	18
FW	(England)	Len Townsend	8	7	15
FW	(Scotland)	Peter McKennan	14	0	14
FW	(England)	Les Smith	12	1	13
FW	(Scotland)	George Stewart	8	0	8
FW	(England)	Dennis Westcott	1	5	6
FW	(Wales)	Johnny Baynham	2	—	2
FW	(England)	Bob Thomas	2	—	2
FW	(Wales)	Idris Hopkins	2	0	2
HB	(England)	Jimmy Watson	2	0	2
FW	(England)	Allenby Driver	1	—	1
FW	(England)	Fred Durrant	1	—	1
HB	(England)	Jack Holliday	1	—	1
FW	(England)	George Little	1	—	1
HB	(England)	Frank Soo	1	0	1
FW	(England)	Ernie Shepherd	0	1	1
FW	(England)	Arthur Stevens	0	1	1
Total			71	18	89

- Players listed in italics left the club mid-season.
- Source: 100 Years Of Brentford

=== Wartime international caps ===
Pos.	Nat	Player	Caps	Goals	Ref
GK	(Scotland)	Joe Crozier	3	0	
FW	(Wales)	Idris Hopkins	1	0	
FW	(England)	Les Smith	3	1	

=== Management ===
Name	Nat	From	To	Record All Comps					Record League				
Name	Nat	From	To	P	W	D	L	W %	P	W	D	L	W %
Harry Curtis	(England)	28 August 1943	6 May 1944	36	16	8	12	44.44|	30	14	7	9	46.67

=== Summary ===
Games played	36 (30 Football League South, 6 Football League War Cup)
Games won	16 (14 Football League South, 2 Football League War Cup)
Games drawn	8 (7 Football League South, 1 Football League War Cup)
Games lost	12 (9 Football League South, 3 Football League War Cup)
Goals scored	89 (71 Football League South, 18 Football League War Cup)
Goals conceded	68 (51 Football League South, 17 Football League War Cup)
Clean sheets	10 (9 Football League South, 1 Football League War Cup)
Biggest league win	7–2 versus Southampton, 18 December 1943
Worst league defeat	5–2 versus Queens Park Rangers, 25 December 1943
Most appearances	35, Buster Brown (30 Football League South, 5 Football League War Cup)
Top scorer (league)	15, Douglas Hunt
Top scorer (all competitions)	18, Douglas Hunt

== Transfers & loans ==
Guest players' arrival and departure dates correspond to their first and last appearances of the season.

Guest players in
Date from	Pos.	Name	Previous club	Date to	Ref.
28 August 1943	FW	(England) Douglas Hunt	(England) Sheffield Wednesday	End of season	
28 August 1943	HB	(England) Len Jones	(England) Plymouth Argyle	28 August 1943	
28 August 1943	HB	(Scotland) Duncan McKenzie	(England) Middlesbrough	22 January 1944	
28 August 1943	FW	(Scotland) George Stewart	(Scotland) Hamilton Academical	End of season	
28 August 1943	HB	(England) Jimmy Watson	(England) Bristol Rovers	22 April 1944	
4 September 1943	GK	(Wales) John Jones	(England) Northampton Town	11 September 1943	
4 September 1943	HB	(England) Bill Whittaker	(England) Charlton Athletic	End of season	
11 September 1943	FW	(England) Harry Thompson	(England) Sunderland	11 September 1943	
18 September 1943	FW	(Scotland) Peter McKennan	(Scotland) Partick Thistle	10 April 1944	
18 September 1943	HB	(England) Frank Soo	(England) Stoke City	18 March 1944	
16 October 1943	GK	(England) Charlie Briggs	(England) Halifax Town	19 December 1942	
23 October 1943	DF	(England) Fred Lester	(England) Sheffield Wednesday	23 October 1943	
23 October 1943	FW	(England) Charlie Leyfield	(England) Doncaster Rovers	23 October 1943	
30 October 1943	FW	(England) Allenby Driver	(England) Sheffield Wednesday	30 October 1943	
6 November 1943	FW	(England) Dickie Davis	(England) Sunderland	13 November 1943	
6 November 1943	GK	(England) Harry Dukes	(England) Norwich City	27 December 1943	
6 November 1943	FW	(Scotland) Bobby Flavell	(Scotland) Airdrieonians	6 November 1943	
6 November 1943	FW	(England) George Little	(England) Doncaster Rovers	27 November 1943	
13 November 1943	HB	(Scotland) David Nelson	(England) Arsenal	8 January 1944	
4 December 1943	FW	(Scotland) Tommy Kiernan	(Scotland) Albion Rovers	22 January 1944	
27 December 1943	DF	(England) George Taylor	(England) Bolton Wanderers	27 December 1943	
1 January 1944	GK	(England) Gordon Bentley	(England) Burnley	11 March 1944	
22 January 1944	FW	(England) Ernie Shepherd	(England) Fulham	11 March 1944	
29 January 1944	FW	(Scotland) Johnny Deakin	(Scotland) St Mirren	29 January 1944	
5 February 1944	FW	(England) Dennis Westcott	(England) Wolverhampton Wanderers	18 March 1944	
19 February 1944	GK	(England) Freddie Houldsworth	(England) Reading	19 February 1944	
19 February 1944	FW	(England) Arthur Stevens	(England) Fulham	19 February 1944	
26 February 1944	GK	(England) Alec Roxburgh	(England) Blackpool	27 March 1943	
4 March 1944	DF	(Scotland) Ralph Cowan	(Scotland) Rangers	4 March 1944	
1 April 1944	GK	(England) Bill Mason	(England) Queens Park Rangers	1 April 1944	
1 April 1944	HB	(Scotland) Jack Watson	(England) Bury	1 April 1944	
10 April 1944	HB	(Scotland) Frank Jenner	(Scotland) St Mirren	10 April 1944	
6 May 1944	FW	(England) Dickie Girling	(England) Crystal Palace	End of season	
Guest players out
Date from	Pos.	Name	To	Date to	Ref.
9 October 1943	HB	(England) Ernest Muttitt	(England) Watford	9 October 1943	
4 December 1943	HB	(England) Ernest Muttitt	(England) Chelsea	4 December 1943	
22 January 1944	HB	(England) Tom Manley	(England) Tottenham Hotspur	22 January 1944	
5 February 1944	HB	(England) Ernest Muttitt	(England) West Ham United	5 February 1944	
n/a	DF	(England) Jimmy Anderson	(Scotland) Hamilton Academical	n/a	
n/a	HB	(England) Ernest Muttitt	(England) Crystal Palace	n/a	
n/a	HB	(England) Ernest Muttitt	(England) Clapton Orient	n/a	
n/a	HB	(England) Ernest Muttitt	(England) Fulham	n/a	
n/a	HB	(England) Ernest Muttitt	(England) Reading	n/a	
n/a	HB	(England) Ernest Muttitt	(England) Brighton & Hove Albion	n/a	
Players released
Date	Pos.	Name	Subsequent club	Join date	Ref.
May 1944	FW	(England) Jack Holliday	Retired		
May 1944	HB	(England) Joe James	Retired		
