= 1944–45 Brentford F.C. season =

English football team season

Brentford
1944–45 season
- Chairman: Frank Davis
- Manager: Harry Curtis
- Stadium: Griffin Park
- Football League South: 3rd
- Football League South War Cup: Group stage
- Top goalscorer: League: Townsend (24); All: Townsend (31)
- Highest home attendance: 23,207
- Lowest home attendance: 4,390
- Average home league attendance: 25,768
Home colours

During the 1944–45 English football season, Brentford competed in the Football League South, due to the cessation of competitive football for the duration of the Second World War. The Bees finished in a wartime-high of 3rd-place, scoring 100 goals in both the league and Football League War Cup, with forwards Len Townsend and Bob Thomas accounting for over half the team's total.

== Season summary ==
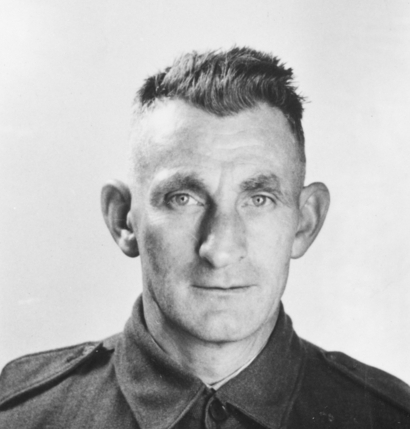
Former Brentford forward Ralph Shields died on 21 November 1944, while a prisoner of war.

The familiar pattern of player unavailability prevailed as Brentford entered the 1944–45 Football League South season, with 60 players eventually being used over the course of the league, cup and friendly matches during the campaign. A number of the club's amateur players were pressed into service during the regular season, as were 30 guests, many of whom made three appearances or less.

Aided by prolific scoring from forwards Len Townsend and Bob Thomas, Brentford rocketed along in the first half of the season, losing just four of 22 matches and posting big wins by margins of four, five and six goals. The Bees' form evaporated when the Football League War Cup campaign got underway in February 1945, losing four of six matches to crash out in the group stage. Brentford lost four of the remaining six league matches of the season, with the final match away to Watford (which had been postponed in January 1945) taking place after VE Day, which marked the end of the Second World War in Europe.

Two former Brentford players died during the season:

- Private Ralph Shields died as a prisoner of war in Sandakan Prisoner of War Camp, North Borneo on 21 November 1944. He had been serving in the Australian Army Service Corps and played for Brentford during the 1921–22 season.
- Sub-lieutenant Stan Cousins was killed when "his aircraft flew into a barrage balloon cable and lost a wing" during a glide bomb attack on the Soengi Gerong oil refinery, Sumatra on 29 January 1945. Formerly an employee of Glyn, Mills & Co, he had joined the Royal Naval Volunteer Reserve and was serving on HMS Illustrious when he was killed. Cousins made a single Football League War Cup appearance during the 1940–41 season.

== League table ==
Pos	Team	Pld	W	D	L	GF	GA	GR	Pts
2	West Ham United	30	22	3	5	96	47	2.043	47
3	Brentford	30	17	4	9	87	57	1.526	38
4	Chelsea	30	16	5	9	100	55	1.818	37

Source: Rec.Sport.Soccer Statistics Foundation

== Results ==
Brentford's goal tally listed first.

=== Legend ===
Win	Draw	Loss

=== Football League South ===
No.	Date	Opponent	Venue	Result	Attendance	Scorer(s)
1	26 August 1944	Brighton & Hove Albion	H	6–2	6,000	Townsend (2), Boulter, Hunt (2, 1 pen), Soo
2	2 September 1944	Portsmouth	A	4–2	9,500	Hunt, R. Thomas (2), Boulter
3	9 September 1944	Chelsea	H	0–5	16,100	
4	16 September 1944	Luton Town	A	3–1	3,500	Manley, Boulter, R. Thomas
5	23 September 1944	Millwall	H	4–1	8,750	Townsend (2), R. Thomas (2)
6	30 September 1944	Aldershot	H	5–2	10,270	Smith (2, 1 pen), Hunt, R. Thomas (2)
7	7 October 1944	Charlton Athletic	A	4–0	7,143	Boulter (2), Townsend (2)
8	14 October 1944	Watford	H	4–1	5,387	Townsend (2), R. Thomas (2), Hopkins
9	21 October 1944	Queens Park Rangers	H	3–1	15,000	Rose (og), R. Thomas, Townsend
10	28 October 1944	Tottenham Hotspur	H	2–2	23,207	R. Thomas, Soo
11	4 November 1944	Fulham	A	2–0	25,000	R. Thomas, Townsend
12	11 November 1944	Southampton	H	0–1	11,080	
13	18 November 1944	Crystal Palace	H	1–2	11,100	Townsend
14	25 November 1944	Reading	A	4–4	6,000	Hunt (2), Townsend (2)
15	2 December 1944	Brighton & Hove Albion	A	7–2	5,000	Townsend (3), Smith, R. Thomas (2), Hunt
16	9 December 1944	Portsmouth	H	7–1	9,550	C. Brown (2), Hunt (2, 1 pen), Townsend (2), Hopkins
17	16 December 1944	Chelsea	A	2–0	24,500	Hunt, R. Thomas
18	23 December 1944	Arsenal	A	2–5	18,527	R. Thomas (2)
19	30 December 1944	Luton Town	H	6–0	6,500	Townsend (4), R. Thomas, Smith
20	6 January 1945	Millwall	A	0–0	5,438	
21	13 January 1945	Aldershot	A	1–0	4,000	Smith
22	20 January 1945	Charlton Athletic	H	3–1	6,850	Hunt, R. Thomas, Baynham
23	17 March 1945	Queens Park Rangers	A	1–1	5,900	D. Thomas
24	24 March 1945	Tottenham Hotspur	H	0–2	16,750	
25	31 March 1945	Fulham	H	2–3	8,780	Hopkins, Smith
26	2 April 1945	Arsenal	H	3–1	n/a	R. Thomas (2), D. Thomas
27	14 April 1945	Southampton	A	2–4	7,549	Hunt, Townsend
28	21 April 1945	Crystal Palace	A	1–6	6,492	D. Thomas
29	28 April 1945	Reading	H	7–2	4,390	R. Thomas (2), D. Thomas (2), Smith, Baynham (2)
30	19 May 1945	Watford	A	1–5	2,563	Cheetham

=== Football League South War Cup ===
Round	Date	Opponent	Venue	Result	Attendance	Scorer(s)
Grp	3 February 1945	Brighton & Hove Albion	H	3–5	10,110	Townsend (3)
Grp	10 February 1945	Millwall	A	2–3	8,553	R. Thomas, Hunt
Grp	17 February 1945	Fulham	A	0–1	15,000	
Grp	24 February 1945	Brighton & Hove Albion	A	4–2	10,000	Townsend (3), R. Thomas
Grp	3 March 1945	Millwall	H	2–2	11,830	Baynham, R. Thomas
Grp	10 March 1945	Fulham	H	2–5	10,380	Townsend, R. Thomas

- Source: 100 Years Of Brentford

== Playing squad ==
Players' ages are as of the opening day of the 1944–45 season.

Pos.	Name	Nat.	Date of birth (age)	Signed from	Signed in	Notes
Goalkeepers
GK	Reg Saunders	(England)	29 July 1920 (aged 24)	Uxbridge Town	1944	Amateur
Defenders
DF	Buster Brown	(England)	6 September 1910 (aged 33)	Huddersfield Town	1937	
DF	Bill Gorman	(Republic of Ireland)	13 January 1911 (aged 33)	Bury	1938	
DF	George Poyser	(England)	6 February 1910 (aged 34)	Port Vale	1934	
Midfielders
HB	Albert Ballard	(England)	August 1923 (aged 20–21)	Youth	1944	
HB	Ted Ballard	(England)	16 June 1920 (aged 24)	Hayes	1943	Amateur
HB	Albert Hammond	(England)	5 February 1924 (aged 20)	Queens Park Rangers	1944	Amateur
HB	Tom Manley	(England)	7 October 1912 (aged 31)	Manchester United	1939	
HB	Ernest Muttitt	(England)	24 July 1908 (aged 36)	Middlesbrough	1932	Guest for Chelsea and Fulham
HB	Billy Scott	(England)	6 December 1907 (aged 36)	Middlesbrough	1932	
Forwards
FW	Johnny Baynham	(Wales)	21 April 1918 (aged 26)	Youth	1939	
FW	Les Boulter	(Wales)	31 August 1913 (aged 30)	Charlton Athletic	1939	
FW	Cyril Brown	(England)	25 May 1918 (aged 26)	Felixstowe	1939	
FW	Tommy Cheetham	(England)	11 October 1910 (aged 33)	Queens Park Rangers	1939	Guest for Queens Park Rangers and West Ham United
FW	Idris Hopkins	(Wales)	11 October 1910 (aged 33)	Crystal Palace	1932	Guest for West Ham United
FW	Peter Sheldon	(England)	April 1927 (aged 17)	Youth	1944	
FW	Les Smith	(England)	13 March 1918 (aged 26)	Petersham	1934	Guest for Chelsea
FW	Bob Thomas	(England)	2 August 1919 (aged 25)	Golders Green	1939	Guest for West Ham United
FW	Len Townsend	(England)	31 August 1917 (aged 26)	Hayes	1937	Guest for Brighton & Hove Albion, Swansea Town and West Ham United
Guest players
GK	Johnny Boyd	(Scotland)	n/a	Unattached	1945	Amateur, guest
GK	Harry Brown	(England)	9 April 1924 (aged 20)	Queens Park Rangers	1944	Guest from Queens Park Rangers
GK	John Jackson	(Scotland)	29 November 1906 (aged 37)	Chelsea	1944	Guest from Chelsea
GK	John Jones	(Wales)	25 November 1916 (aged 27)	Northampton Town	1944	Guest from Northampton Town
DF	Arthur Banner	(England)	28 June 1918 (aged 26)	West Ham United	1945	Guest from West Ham United
DF	Ralph Cowan	(Scotland)	n/a	Rangers	1944	Guest from Rangers
DF	Peter Croker	(England)	21 December 1921 (aged 22)	Charlton Athletic	1945	Guest from Charlton Athletic
DF	Fred Dawes	(England)	2 May 1911 (aged 33)	Crystal Palace	1945	Guest from Crystal Palace
DF	James Fullwood	(England)	17 February 1911 (aged 33)	Reading	1944	Guest from Reading
DF	Les Goldberg	(England)	3 January 1918 (aged 26)	Leeds United	1944	Guest from Leeds United
DF	Dick Jales	(England)	3 April 1922 (aged 22)	Bradford City	1945	Guest from Bradford City
DF	Cliff Lloyd	(England)	14 November 1916 (aged 27)	Wrexham	1944	Guest from Wrexham
DF	Reg Mountford	(England)	16 July 1908 (aged 36)	Huddersfield Town	1945	Guest from Huddersfield Town
HB	Sam Briddon	(England)	26 July 1915 (aged 29)	Swansea Town	1944	Guest from Swansea Town
HB	Matt Busby	(Scotland)	26 May 1909 (aged 35)	Liverpool	1944	Guest from Liverpool
HB	Ernie Collett	(England)	17 November 1914 (aged 29)	Arsenal	1945	Guest from Arsenal
HB	Harold Hobbis	(England)	9 March 1913 (aged 31)	Charlton Athletic	1945	Guest from Charlton Athletic
HB	Joe Jobling	(England)	29 July 1906 (aged 38)	Charlton Athletic	1945	Guest from Charlton Athletic
HB	Duncan McKenzie	(Scotland)	10 August 1912 (aged 32)	Middlesbrough	1945	Guest from Middlesbrough
HB	Jack Oakes	(England)	13 September 1905 (aged 38)	Charlton Athletic	1945	Guest from Charlton Athletic
HB	Taffy O'Callaghan	(Wales)	6 October 1906 (aged 37)	Fulham	1945	Guest from Fulham
HB	Bobby Russell	(Scotland)	27 December 1919 (aged 24)	Chelsea	1945	Guest from Chelsea
HB	Frank Soo	(England)	12 March 1914 (aged 30)	Stoke City	1944	Guest from Stoke City
HB	R. Tunnicliffe	(England)	n/a	Unattached	1945	Guest
HB	Bill F. Whittaker	(England)	18 April 1911 (aged 33)	Kingstonian	1945	Guest from Kingstonian
HB	Bill P. Whittaker	(England)	20 December 1922 (aged 21)	Charlton Athletic	1944	Guest from Charlton Athletic
FW	Maurice Edelston	(England)	27 April 1918 (aged 26)	Reading	1944	Amateur, guest from Reading
FW	Douglas Hunt	(England)	19 May 1914 (aged 30)	Sheffield Wednesday	1944	Guest from Sheffield Wednesday
FW	Archie Livingstone	(Scotland)	15 November 1915 (aged 28)	Bury	1945	Guest from Bury
FW	Bert Stephens	(England)	13 May 1909 (aged 35)	Brighton & Hove Albion	1945	Guest from Brighton & Hove Albion
FW	Maurice Tadman	(England)	28 June 1921 (aged 23)	Charlton Athletic	1945	Guest from Charlton Athletic
FW	Dave Thomas	(England)	6 July 1917 (aged 27)	Plymouth Argyle	1944	Guest from Plymouth Argyle

- Sources: Timeless Bees, Football League Players' Records 1888 to 1939, 100 Years Of Brentford

== Coaching staff ==
Name	Role
(England) Harry Curtis	Manager
(Scotland) Jimmy Bain	Assistant Manager
(England) Bob Kane	Trainer
(England) Jack Cartmell	Assistant Trainer

== Statistics ==
=== Appearances and goals ===

Brentford's highest appearance-makers in each position during the Football League South season.

Pos	Nat	Name	League		FL War Cup		Total	
Pos	Nat	Name	Apps	Goals	Apps	Goals	Apps	Goals
GK	(England)	Reg Saunders	3	0	—		3	0
DF	(England)	Buster Brown	29	0	6	0	35	0
DF	(Republic of Ireland)	Bill Gorman	2	0	4	0	6	0
DF	(England)	George Poyser	20	0	6	0	26	0
HB	(England)	Albert Ballard	1	0	—		1	0
HB	(England)	Ted Ballard	1	0	—		1	0
HB	(England)	Albert Hammond	1	0	—		1	0
HB	(England)	Tom Manley	13	1	—		13	1
HB	(England)	Ernest Muttitt	15	0	3	0	18	0
HB	(England)	Billy Scott	2	0	1	0	3	0
FW	(Wales)	Johnny Baynham	8	3	4	1	12	4
FW	(Wales)	Les Boulter	12	5	—		12	5
FW	(England)	Cyril Brown	2	2	2	0	4	2
FW	(England)	Tommy Cheetham	2	1	—		2	1
FW	(Wales)	Idris Hopkins	28	3	6	0	34	3
FW	(England)	Peter Sheldon	1	0	—		1	0
FW	(England)	Les Smith	20	7	1	0	21	7
FW	(England)	Bob Thomas	28	23	5	4	33	27
FW	(England)	Len Townsend	23	24	5	7	28	31
Players guested during the season
GK	(Scotland)	Johnny Boyd	1	0	1	0	2	0
GK	(England)	Harry Brown	1	0	—		1	0
GK	(Scotland)	John Jackson	16	0	2	0	18	0
GK	(Wales)	John Jones	9	0	3	0	12	0
DF	(England)	Arthur Banner	1	0	1	0	2	0
DF	(Scotland)	Ralph Cowan	3	0	—		3	0
DF	(England)	Peter Croker	1	0	—		1	0
DF	(England)	Fred Dawes	—		1	0	1	0
DF	(England)	James Fullwood	1	0	—		1	0
DF	(England)	Les Goldberg	1	0	—		1	0
DF	(England)	Dick Jales	—		1	0	1	0
DF	(England)	Cliff Lloyd	2	0	—		2	0
DF	(England)	Reg Mountford	1	0	—		1	0
HB	(England)	Sam Briddon	5	0	—		5	0
HB	(Scotland)	Matt Busby	1	0	—		1	0
HB	(England)	Ernie Collett	6	0	—		6	0
HB	(England)	Harold Hobbis	1	0	—		1	0
HB	(England)	Joe Jobling	1	0	—		1	0
HB	(Scotland)	Duncan McKenzie	4	0	—		4	0
HB	(England)	Jack Oakes	2	0	—		2	0
HB	(Wales)	Taffy O'Callaghan	1	0	—		1	0
HB	(Scotland)	Bobby Russell	1	0	—		1	0
HB	(England)	Frank Soo	9	2	1	0	10	2
HB	(England)	R. Tunnicliffe	1	0	—		1	0
HB	(England)	Bill F. Whittaker	1	0	—		1	0
HB	(England)	Bill P. Whittaker	18	0	4	0	24	0
FW	(England)	Maurice Edelston	1	0	—		1	0
FW	(England)	Douglas Hunt	21	12	5	1	26	13
FW	(Scotland)	Archie Livingstone	1	0	—		1	0
FW	(England)	Bert Stephens	1	0	—		1	0
FW	(England)	Maurice Tadman	1	0	—		1	0
FW	(England)	Dave Thomas	6	5	4	0	10	5

- Players listed in italics left the club mid-season.
- Source: 100 Years Of Brentford

=== Goalscorers ===
Pos.	Nat	Player	FLS	FLC	Total
FW	(England)	Len Townsend	24	7	31
FW	(England)	Bob Thomas	23	4	27
FW	(England)	Douglas Hunt	12	1	13
FW	(England)	Les Smith	7	0	7
FW	(Wales)	Les Boulter	5	—	5
FW	(England)	Dave Thomas	5	0	5
FW	(Wales)	Johnny Baynham	3	1	4
FW	(Wales)	Idris Hopkins	3	0	3
FW	(England)	Cyril Brown	2	0	2
HB	(England)	Frank Soo	2	0	2
FW	(England)	Tommy Cheetham	1	—	1
HB	(England)	Tom Manley	1	—	1
Opponents			1	0	1
Total			87	13	100

- Players listed in italics left the club mid-season.
- Source: 100 Years Of Brentford

=== Wartime international caps ===
Pos.	Nat	Player	Caps	Goals	Ref
FW	(England)	Les Smith	5	2	

=== Management ===
Name	Nat	From	To	Record All Comps					Record League				
Name	Nat	From	To	P	W	D	L	W %	P	W	D	L	W %
Harry Curtis	(England)	26 August 1944	19 May 1945	36	18	5	13	50.00|	30	17	4	9	56.67

=== Summary ===
Games played	36 (30 Football League South, 6 Football League War Cup)
Games won	18 (17 Football League South, 1 Football League War Cup)
Games drawn	5 (4 Football League South, 1 Football League War Cup)
Games lost	13 (9 Football League South, 4 Football League War Cup)
Goals scored	100 (87 Football League South, 13 Football League War Cup)
Goals conceded	75 (57 Football League South, 18 Football League War Cup)
Clean sheets	7 (6 Football League South, 0 Football League War Cup)
Biggest league win	6–0 versus Luton Town, 30 December 1944; 7–1 versus Portsmouth, 9 December 1944
Worst league defeat	5–0 versus Chelsea, 9 September 1944; 6–1 versus Crystal Palace, 21 April 1945
Most appearances	35, Buster Brown (29 Football League South, 6 Football League War Cup)
Top scorer (league)	23, Len Townsend
Top scorer (all competitions)	30, Len Townsend

== Transfers & loans ==
Guest players' arrival and departure dates correspond to their first and last appearances of the season.

Players transferred in
Date	Pos.	Name	Previous club	Fee	Ref.
1944	HB	(England) Albert Hammond	(England) Queens Park Rangers	Amateur	
Guest players in
Date from	Pos.	Name	Previous club	Date to	Ref.
26 August 1944	FW	(England) Douglas Hunt	(England) Sheffield Wednesday	28 April 1945	
26 August 1944	HB	(England) Frank Soo	(England) Stoke City	10 February 1945	
26 August 1944	HB	(England) Bill P. Whittaker	(England) Charlton Athletic	21 April 1945	
2 September 1944	HB	(England) Sam Briddon	(Wales) Swansea Town	7 October 1944	
16 September 1944	GK	(Wales) John Jones	(England) Northampton Town	17 February 1945	
14 October 1944	GK	(England) Harry Brown	(England) Queens Park Rangers	14 October 1944	
14 October 1944	DF	(England) Cliff Lloyd	(Wales) Wrexham	28 October 1944	
21 October 1944	GK	(Scotland) John Jackson	(England) Chelsea	End of season	
23 December 1944	HB	(Scotland) Matt Busby	(England) Liverpool	23 December 1944	
23 December 1944	FW	(England) Maurice Edelston	(England) Reading	23 December 1944	
23 December 1944	DF	(England) James Fullwood	(England) Reading	23 December 1944	
23 December 1944	DF	(England) Les Goldberg	(England) Leeds United	23 December 1944	
30 December 1944	DF	(Scotland) Ralph Cowan	(Scotland) Rangers	20 January 1945	
13 January 1945	DF	(England) Reg Mountford	(England) Huddersfield Town	13 January 1945	
17 February 1945	DF	(England) Arthur Banner	(England) West Ham United	24 March 1945	
17 February 1945	FW	(England) Dave Thomas	(England) Plymouth Argyle	End of season	
24 February 1945	DF	(England) Fred Dawes	(England) Crystal Palace	24 February 1945	
10 March 1945	GK	(Scotland) Johnny Boyd	Unattached	28 April 1945	
10 March 1945	DF	(England) Dick Jales	(England) Bradford City	10 March 1945	
17 March 1945	DF	(England) Peter Croker	(England) Charlton Athletic	17 March 1945	
17 March 1945	FW	(Scotland) Archie Livingstone	(England) Bury	17 March 1945	
17 March 1945	HB	(England) Jack Oakes	(England) Charlton Athletic	2 April 1945	
24 March 1945	HB	(Scotland) Bobby Russell	(England) Chelsea	24 March 1945	
24 March 1945	HB	(England) R. Tunnicliffe	Unattached	28 April 1945	
31 March 1945	HB	(England) Harold Hobbis	(England) Charlton Athletic	31 March 1945	
2 April 1945	HB	(Scotland) Duncan McKenzie	(England) Middlesbrough	2 April 1945	
14 April 1945	HB	(Wales) Taffy O'Callaghan	(England) Fulham	End of season	
9 May 1945	HB	(England) Joe Jobling	(England) Charlton Athletic	End of season	
9 May 1945	FW	(England) Bert Stephens	(England) Brighton & Hove Albion	End of season	
9 May 1945	FW	(England) Maurice Tadman	(England) Charlton Athletic	End of season	
9 May 1945	HB	(England) Bill F. Whittaker	(England) Kingstonian	End of season	
Guest players out
Date from	Pos.	Name	To	Date to	Ref.
26 August 1944	FW	(England) Bob Thomas	(England) West Ham United	26 August 1944	
7 October 1944	FW	(England) Tommy Cheetham	(England) Queens Park Rangers	17 March 1945	
5 May 1945	FW	(Wales) Idris Hopkins	(England) West Ham United	5 May 1945	
12 May 1945	FW	(England) Tommy Cheetham	(England) West Ham United	12 May 1945	
n/a	DF	(England) Jimmy Anderson	(Scotland) Hamilton Academical	n/a	
n/a	FW	(England) Fred Durrant	(England) Blackburn Rovers	n/a	
n/a	FW	(England) Ernest Muttitt	(England) Chelsea	n/a	
n/a	FW	(England) Ernest Muttitt	(England) Fulham	n/a	
n/a	FW	(England) Len Townsend	(England) Brighton & Hove Albion	n/a	
n/a	FW	(England) Len Townsend	(Wales) Swansea Town	n/a	
n/a	FW	(England) Len Townsend	(England) West Ham United	n/a	
