= 1942–43 Brentford F.C. season =

English football team season

Brentford
1942–43 season
- Chairman: Louis P. Simon
- Manager: Harry Curtis
- Stadium: Griffin Park
- Football League South: 9th
- Football League South War Cup: Group stage
- Top goalscorer: League: Townsend (18); All: Townsend (19)
- Highest home attendance: 23,180
- Lowest home attendance: 3,210
- Average home league attendance: 25,768
Home colours

During the 1942–43 English football season, Brentford competed in the Football League South, due to the cessation of competitive football for the duration of the Second World War. Early in a mid-table season for the club, inside forward Len Townsend notably scored six goals in a 9–4 victory over Brighton & Hove Albion, the most-ever in any match by a Brentford player.

== Season summary ==
Brentford returned to the Football League South for the 1942–43 season with cause for optimism, having generated over £20,000 (equivalent to £814,700 in 2025) from the semi-finals and the final of the club's victorious 1941–42 London War Cup campaign. Again the first team squad would be hit by a lack of unavailability of players, with no goalkeeper available for the second season in succession. Despite averaging only 12 appearances per season since the war began, centre forward Len Townsend had been averaging nearly a goal a game and was in fantastic form, scoring 17 goals in a 17 match spell, including six in a 9–4 victory over Brighton & Hove Albion on 12 September 1942. The record of six goals in a single match bettered the official club record of five, but due to the unofficial nature of wartime football, Townsend does not hold the club record outright.

Brentford's league form held up until the turn of the year then fell apart, losing 10 of the final 15 matches of the season in all competitions. Guest forwards Eddie Perry and Douglas Hunt, who had scored the bulk of the team's goals since the beginning of the 1940–41 season failed to find the net with such regularity, though Albion Rovers' guest Tommy Kiernan notably scored 9 goals in his 10 appearances. The discontinuation of the London War Cup meant that the Bees would be unable to defend their crown, so the club were entered into the Football League South War Cup, which ended in elimination in the group stages. Brentford finished the league season in 9th place and Len Townsend scored 19 goals in 20 appearances.

== League tables ==
=== Football League South ===
Pos	Team	Pld	W	D	L	GF	GA	GR	Pts
8	Aldershot	28	14	2	12	87	77	1.130	30
9	Brentford	28	12	5	11	64	63	1.016	29
10	Charlton Athletic	28	13	3	12	68	75	0.907	29

Source: Rec.Sport.Soccer Statistics Foundation

=== Football League South War Cup ===
Pos	Team	Pld	W	D	L	GF	GA	GR	Pts
1	Queens Park Rangers	6	4	1	1	16	8	2.000	9
2	Southampton	6	4	0	2	14	6	2.333	8
3	Clapton Orient	6	1	2	3	6	14	0.429	4
4	Brentford	6	1	1	4	7	15	0.467	3

Source: A Record Of British Wartime Football

== Results ==
Brentford's goal tally listed first.

=== Legend ===
Win	Draw	Loss

=== Football League South ===
No.	Date	Opponent	Venue	Result	Attendance	Scorer(s)
1	29 August 1942	Clapton Orient	H	2–2	3,210	Holliday, D. Hunt
2	5 September 1942	Fulham	A	1–3	4,600	D. Hunt
3	12 September 1942	Brighton & Hove Albion	H	9–4	4,020	Townsend (6), Kiernan (2), D. Hunt
4	19 September 1942	Chelsea	H	0–2	8,480	
5	26 September 1942	Queens Park Rangers	A	1–4	8,000	Kiernan
6	3 October 1942	Watford	H	3–0	3,590	Wilkins, Hopkins, D. Hunt
7	10 October 1942	West Ham United	H	6–2	7,000	Kiernan, Fenton (og), Townsend (2)
8	17 October 1942	Arsenal	A	2–0	16,700	Smith, Kiernan
9	24 October 1942	Aldershot	H	4–1	5,000	D. Hunt, Townsend, Aicken, Kiernan
10	31 October 1942	Luton Town	H	2–2	5,000	Sneddon, Townsend
11	7 November 1942	Millwall	A	2–1	4,557	D. Hunt, Perry
12	14 November 1942	Charlton Athletic	A	4–1	3,000	Perry (2), Townsend, D. Hunt
13	21 November 1942	Reading	H	3–3	5,390	Kiernan, D. Hunt (2)
14	28 November 1942	Clapton Orient	A	0–2	2,500	
15	5 December 1942	Fulham	H	4–2	5,200	Townsend (3), McKenzie
16	12 December 1942	Brighton & Hove Albion	A	2–7	4,000	Townsend, D. Hunt
17	19 December 1942	Chelsea	A	4–2	8,154	Townsend, McKenzie (2), Hopkins
18	25 December 1942	Tottenham Hotspur	A	1–1	14,621	Townsend
19	26 December 1942	Tottenham Hotspur	H	2–1	12,540	Townsend, Hopkins
20	2 January 1943	Queens Park Rangers	H	2–0	7,500	D. Hunt (2)
21	9 January 1943	Watford	A	0–2	2,177	
22	16 January 1943	West Ham United	A	1–4	7,500	Perry
23	23 January 1943	Arsenal	H	0–1	23,180	
24	30 January 1943	Aldershot	A	1–2	4,000	Townsend
25	6 February 1943	Luton Town	A	1–1	3,000	Hunt (og)
26	13 February 1943	Millwall	H	3–1	5,150	McCulloch (2), Perry
27	20 February 1943	Charlton Athletic	H	3–5	4,680	James, Armstrong, Smith
28	27 February 1943	Reading	A	1–7	4,000	Henley

=== Football League South War Cup ===
Round	Date	Opponent	Venue	Result	Attendance	Scorer(s)
Grp	6 March 1943	Queens Park Rangers	H	1–2	10,520	O'Donnell
Grp	13 March 1943	Clapton Orient	A	1–1	3,707	Hopkins
Grp	20 March 1943	Southampton	H	1–6	6,600	Townsend
Grp	27 March 1943	Queens Park Rangers	A	0–2	9,954	
Grp	3 April 1943	Clapton Orient	H	3–2	4,080	D. Hunt (2, 1 pen), Hopkins
Grp	10 April 1943	Southampton	A	1–2	13,000	Holliday

- Source: 100 Years Of Brentford

== Playing squad ==
Players' ages are as of the opening day of the 1942–43 season.

Pos.	Name	Nat.	Date of birth (age)	Signed from	Signed in	Notes
Defenders
DF	Buster Brown	(England)	6 September 1910 (aged 31)	Huddersfield Town	1937	
DF	George Poyser	(England)	6 February 1910 (aged 32)	Port Vale	1934	
Midfielders
HB	Joe James	(England)	13 January 1910 (aged 32)	Battersea Church	1929	
HB	Ernest Muttitt	(England)	24 July 1908 (aged 34)	Middlesbrough	1932	Guest for Aldershot, Chelsea, Fulham and West Ham United
Forwards
FW	Vic Aicken	(Ireland)	29 October 1914 (aged 27)	Glentoran	1937	Guest for Watford
FW	Tommy Cheetham	(England)	11 October 1910 (aged 31)	Queens Park Rangers	1939	
FW	Jack Holliday	(England)	19 December 1908 (aged 33)	Middlesbrough	1932	
FW	Idris Hopkins	(Wales)	11 October 1910 (aged 31)	Crystal Palace	1932	
FW	Billy Scott	(England)	6 December 1907 (aged 34)	Middlesbrough	1932	
FW	Les Smith	(England)	13 March 1918 (aged 24)	Petersham	1934	
FW	Len Townsend	(England)	31 August 1917 (aged 24)	Hayes	1937	Guest for Belfast Celtic
FW	George Wilkins	(England)	27 October 1919 (aged 22)	Hayes	1939	
Guest players
GK	Harry Dukes	(England)	31 March 1912 (aged 30)	Norwich City	1941	Guest from Norwich City
GK	Ken Groves	(England)	9 October 1921 (aged 20)	Preston North End	1943	Guest from Preston North End
GK	John Jackson	(Scotland)	29 November 1906 (aged 35)	Chelsea	1942	Guest from Chelsea
GK	Bill Mason	(England)	31 October 1908 (aged 33)	Queens Park Rangers	1942	Guest from Queens Park Rangers
GK	Reg Saphin	(England)	8 August 1916 (aged 26)	Walthamstow Avenue	1943	Guest from Walthamstow Avenue
DF	Alex Muir	(Scotland)	n/a	Albion Rovers	1942	Guest from Albion Rovers
HB	Ernie Collett	(England)	17 November 1914 (aged 27)	Arsenal	1943	Guest from Arsenal
HB	Duncan McKenzie	(Scotland)	10 August 1912 (aged 30)	Middlesbrough	1943	Guest from Middlesbrough
HB	Tally Sneddon	(Scotland)	1 April 1914 (aged 28)	Swansea Town	1942	Guest from Swansea Town
HB	Bill Whittaker	(England)	20 December 1922 (aged 19)	Charlton Athletic	1942	Guest from Charlton Athletic
FW	Matt Armstrong	(Scotland)	12 November 1911 (aged 30)	Aberdeen	1942	Guest from Aberdeen
FW	Albert Bonass	(England)	29 May 1911 (aged 31)	Queens Park Rangers	1942	Guest from Queens Park Rangers
FW	Walter Boyes	(England)	5 January 1913 (aged 29)	Everton	1943	Guest from Everton
FW	Edwin Cunningham	(England)	20 September 1919 (aged 22)	Bristol City	1942	Guest from Bristol City
FW	Harry Dooley	(England)	n/a	Unattached	1943	Guest
FW	Allenby Driver	(England)	29 September 1919 (aged 22)	Sheffield Wednesday	1943	Guest from Sheffield Wednesday
FW	Jack Finch	(England)	3 February 1909 (aged 33)	Fulham	1943	Guest from Fulham
FW	Dick Foss	(England)	12 November 1912 (aged 29)	Chelsea	1942	Guest from Chelsea
FW	Pat Gallacher	(Scotland)	9 January 1913 (aged 29)	Bournemouth	1942	Guest from Bournemouth
FW	Les Henley	(England)	26 September 1922 (aged 19)	Arsenal	1943	Guest from Arsenal
FW	Dennis Hillman	(England)	27 November 1918 (aged 23)	Brighton & Hove Albion	1943	Guest from Brighton & Hove Albion
FW	Douglas Hunt	(England)	19 May 1914 (aged 28)	Sheffield Wednesday	1942	Guest from Sheffield Wednesday
FW	Tommy Kiernan	(Scotland)	20 October 1918 (aged 23)	Albion Rovers	1942	Guest from Albion Rovers
FW	David McCulloch	(Scotland)	5 October 1912 (aged 29)	Derby County	1943	Guest from Derby County
FW	Milton	(England)	n/a	Fulham	1943	Amateur, guest from Fulham
FW	Frank O'Donnell	(Scotland)	31 August 1911 (aged 30)	Blackpool	1943	Guest from Blackpool
FW	Eddie Perry	(Wales)	19 January 1909 (aged 33)	Doncaster Rovers	1942	Guest from Doncaster Rovers
FW	Reg Pugh	(Wales)	28 July 1917 (aged 25)	Cardiff City	1942	Guest from Cardiff City
FW	Jack Vidler	(England)	13 June 1905 (aged 37)	Bristol City	1943	Guest from Bristol City

- Sources: Timeless Bees, Football League Players' Records 1888 to 1939, 100 Years Of Brentford

== Coaching staff ==
Name	Role
(England) Harry Curtis	Manager
(Scotland) Jimmy Bain	Assistant Manager
(England) Bob Kane	Trainer
(England) Jack Cartmell	Assistant Trainer

== Statistics ==
=== Appearances and goals ===

Brentford's highest appearance-makers in each position during the Football League South season.

Pos	Nat	Name	League		FL War Cup		Total	
Pos	Nat	Name	Apps	Goals	Apps	Goals	Apps	Goals
DF	(England)	Buster Brown	28	0	6	0	34	0
DF	(England)	George Poyser	25	0	6	0	31	0
HB	(England)	Joe James	27	1	6	0	33	1
HB	(England)	Ernest Muttitt	6	0	4	0	10	0
FW	(Ireland)	Vic Aicken	2	1	—		2	1
FW	(England)	Tommy Cheetham	2	0	—		2	0
FW	(England)	Jack Holliday	5	2	1	1	6	3
FW	(Wales)	Idris Hopkins	22	3	6	2	28	5
FW	(England)	Billy Scott	2	0	—		2	0
FW	(England)	Les Smith	20	2	6	0	26	2
FW	(England)	Len Townsend	19	18	1	1	20	19
FW	(England)	George Wilkins	4	1	—		4	1
Players guested during the season
GK	(England)	Harry Dukes	1	0	—		1	0
GK	(England)	Ken Groves	—		1	0	1	0
GK	(Scotland)	John Jackson	26	0	3	0	29	0
GK	(England)	Bill Mason	1	0	—		1	0
GK	(England)	Reg Saphin	—		1	0	1	0
DF	(Scotland)	Alex Muir	2	0	—		2	0
HB	(England)	Ernie Collett	—		3	0	3	0
HB	(Scotland)	Duncan McKenzie	25	3	4	0	29	3
HB	(Scotland)	Tally Sneddon	18	1	—		18	1
HB	(England)	Bill Whittaker	8	0	1	0	9	0
FW	(Scotland)	Matt Armstrong	3	1	—		3	1
FW	(England)	Albert Bonass	1	0	—		1	0
FW	(England)	Walter Boyes	2	0	—		2	0
FW	(England)	Edwin Cunningham	1	0	—		1	0
FW	(England)	Harry Dooley	—		1	0	1	0
FW	(England)	Allenby Driver	1	0	—		1	0
FW	(England)	Jack Finch	1	0	1	0	1	0
FW	(England)	Dick Foss	1	0	—		1	0
FW	(Scotland)	Pat Gallacher	1	0	—		1	0
FW	(England)	Les Henley	1	1	—		1	1
FW	(England)	Dennis Hillman	1	0	—		1	0
FW	(England)	Douglas Hunt	24	12	5	2	29	14
FW	(Scotland)	Tommy Kiernan	10	9	—		10	9
FW	(Scotland)	David McCulloch	2	2	—		2	2
FW	(England)	Milton	1	0	1	0	2	0
FW	(Scotland)	Frank O'Donnell	1	1	—		1	1
FW	(Wales)	Reg Pugh	1	0	—		1	0
FW	(Wales)	Eddie Perry	13	5	5	0	18	5
FW	(England)	Jack Vidler	1	0	—		1	0

- Players listed in italics left the club mid-season.
- Source: 100 Years Of Brentford

=== Goalscorers ===
Pos.	Nat	Player	FLS	FLC	Total
FW	(England)	Len Townsend	18	1	19
FW	(England)	Douglas Hunt	12	2	14
FW	(Scotland)	Tommy Kiernan	9	—	9
FW	(Wales)	Eddie Perry	5	0	5
FW	(Wales)	Idris Hopkins	3	2	5
HB	(Scotland)	Duncan McKenzie	3	0	3
FW	(England)	Jack Holliday	2	1	3
FW	(Scotland)	David McCulloch	2	—	2
FW	(England)	Les Smith	2	0	2
FW	(Ireland)	Vic Aicken	1	—	1
FW	(Scotland)	Matt Armstrong	1	—	1
FW	(England)	Les Henley	1	—	1
FW	(Scotland)	Frank O'Donnell	1	—	1
HB	(Scotland)	Tally Sneddon	1	—	1
FW	(England)	George Wilkins	1	—	1
HB	(England)	Joe James	1	0	1
Opponents			2	0	2
Total			64	7	71

- Players listed in italics left the club mid-season.
- Source: 100 Years Of Brentford

=== Wartime international caps ===
Pos.	Nat	Player	Caps	Goals	Ref
FW	(Wales)	Idris Hopkins	2	0	

=== Management ===
Name	Nat	From	To	Record All Comps					Record League				
Name	Nat	From	To	P	W	D	L	W %	P	W	D	L	W %
Harry Curtis	(England)	29 August 1942	10 April 1943	34	13	6	15	38.24|	28	12	5	11	42.86

=== Summary ===
Games played	34 (28 London League, 6 Football League War Cup)
Games won	13 (12 London League, 1 Football League War Cup)
Games drawn	6 (5 London League, 1 Football League War Cup)
Games lost	15 (11 London League, 4 Football League War Cup)
Goals scored	71 (64 London League, 7 Football League War Cup)
Goals conceded	78 (63 London League, 15 Football League War Cup)
Clean sheets	3 (3 London League, 0 Football League War Cup)
Biggest league win	9–4 versus Brighton & Hove Albion, 12 September 1942
Worst league defeat	7–1 versus Reading, 27 February 1943
Most appearances	34, Buster Brown (28 London League, 6 Football League War Cup)
Top scorer (league)	18, Len Townsend
Top scorer (all competitions)	19, Len Townsend

== Transfers & loans ==
Guest players' arrival and departure dates correspond to their first and last appearances of the season.

Guest players in
Date from	Pos.	Name	Previous club	Date to	Ref.
29 August 1942	FW	(England) Albert Bonass	(England) Queens Park Rangers	29 August 1942	
29 August 1942	FW	(England) Douglas Hunt	(England) Sheffield Wednesday	End of season	
29 August 1942	GK	(England) Bill Mason	(England) Queens Park Rangers	29 August 1942	
29 August 1942	HB	(Scotland) Duncan McKenzie	(England) Middlesbrough	End of season	
5 September 1942	FW	(England) Edwin Cunningham	(England) Bristol City	5 September 1942	
5 September 1942	GK	(Scotland) John Jackson	(England) Chelsea	20 March 1943	
5 September 1942	HB	(Scotland) Tally Sneddon	(Wales) Swansea Town	27 February 1943	
5 September 1942	HB	(England) Bill Whittaker	(England) Charlton Athletic	End of season	
12 September 1942	FW	(Scotland) Tommy Kiernan	(Scotland) Albion Rovers	19 December 1942	
26 September 1942	FW	(Scotland) Pat Gallacher	(England) Portsmouth	26 September 1942	
26 September 1942	FW	(Wales) Reg Pugh	(Wales) Cardiff City	26 September 1942	
10 October 1942	FW	(Scotland) Matt Armstrong	(Scotland) Aberdeen	20 February 1943	
31 October 1942	FW	(Wales) Eddie Perry	(England) Doncaster Rovers	3 April 1943	
12 December 1942	GK	(England) Harry Dukes	(England) Norwich City	12 December 1942	
19 December 1942	FW	(England) Dick Foss	(England) Chelsea	19 December 1942	
25 December 1942	DF	(Scotland) Alex Muir	(Scotland) Albion Rovers	26 December 1942	
2 January 1943	FW	(England) Allenby Driver	(England) Sheffield Wednesday	2 January 1943	
2 January 1943	FW	(England) Jack Finch	(England) Fulham	6 March 1943	
9 January 1943	FW	(England) Jack Vidler	(England) Bristol City	9 January 1943	
23 January 1943	FW	(Scotland) David McCulloch	(England) Derby County	13 February 1943	
6 February 1943	FW	(England) Walter Boyes	(England) Everton	13 February 1943	
20 February 1943	FW	(England) Milton	Unattached	13 March 1943	
27 February 1943	FW	(England) Les Henley	(England) Arsenal	27 February 1943	
27 February 1943	FW	(England) Dennis Hillman	(England) Brighton & Hove Albion	27 February 1943	
6 March 1943	FW	(Scotland) Frank O'Donnell	(England) Blackpool	6 March 1943	
20 March 1943	HB	(England) Ernie Collett	(England) Arsenal	3 April 1943	
27 March 1943	FW	(England) Harry Dooley	Unattached	End of season	
27 March 1943	GK	(England) Ken Groves	(England) Preston North End	27 March 1943	
3 April 1943	GK	(England) Reg Saphin	(England) Walthamstow Avenue	End of season	
Guest players out
Date from	Pos.	Name	To	Date to	Ref.
8 August 1942	GK	(Scotland) Joe Crozier	(Scotland) Hibernian	5 September 1942	
12 December 1942	HB	(Ireland) Vic Aicken	(England) Watford	19 December 1942	
19 September 1942	HB	(England) Ernest Muttitt	(England) Chelsea	19 September 1942	
9 January 1943	HB	(England) Ernest Muttitt	(England) West Ham United	9 January 1943	
27 March 1943	HB	(England) Ernest Muttitt	(England) Chelsea	10 April 1943	
n/a	HB	(England) Ernest Muttitt	(England) Aldershot	n/a	
n/a	HB	(England) Ernest Muttitt	(England) Fulham	n/a	
n/a	FW	(England) Len Townsend	(Ireland) Belfast Celtic	1943	
