= Baynham =

Baynham is a surname with its origins in the United Kingdom and with the variations of Baynam, Bayham, Bynum, Beniams, and Byneham.

== History and origins ==
The Baynham name can be traced back to the Surname 1380 in the form of Ap Eynon. The name is therefore of Welsh origin. There has been a multitude of nobles who have held the surname, and the name has a coat of arms.

== Notable people sharing the surname "Baynham" ==
- Albert Baynham, English footballer
- Craig Baynham, American Football player
- John Baynham, MP
- Johnny Baynham (1918–1995), Welsh footballer
- Peter Baynham, British comedy writer and performer
- Ronald Baynham (1929–2024), English footballer
- Thomas Baynham, High Sheriff of Gloucestershire in 1476
