= PFA Merit Award =

Award given by the Professional Footballers' Association

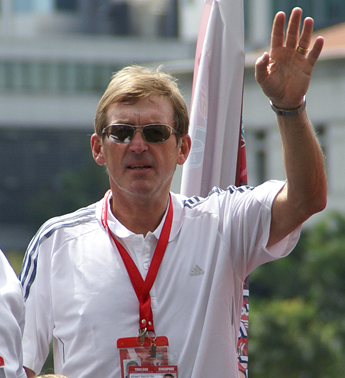
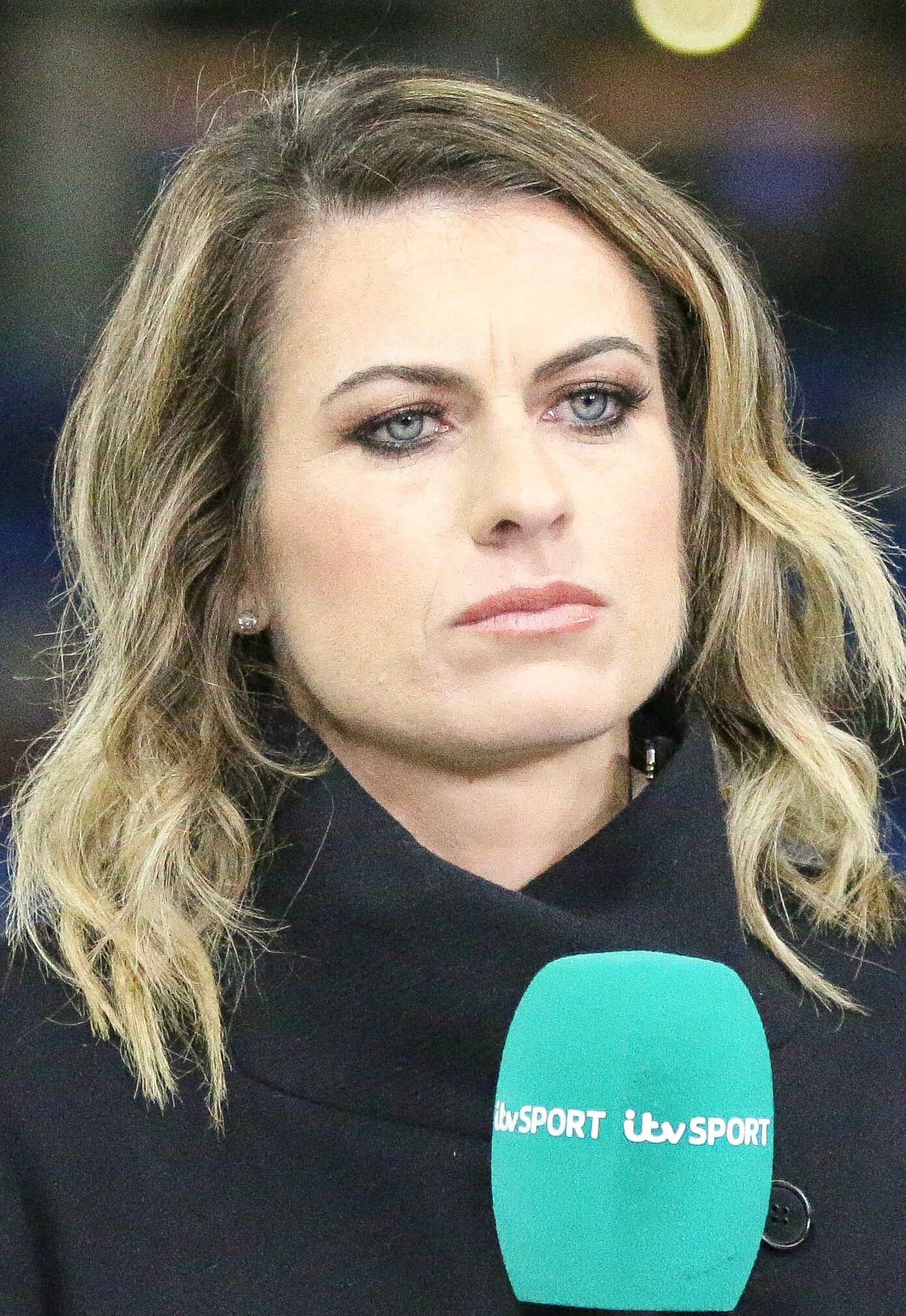
Kenny Dalglish and Karen Carney are the most recent honorees in 2026

The Professional Footballers' Association Merit Award (often called the PFA Merit Award, or simply the Merit Award) is an award given by the Professional Footballers' Association (the PFA) for meritorious service to football.

The award was first given in 1974, and was won (jointly) by Bobby Charlton and Cliff Lloyd. The first woman to win the award was Steph Houghton in 2019. In 2022, the award was separated into two: women's and men's.

The most recent winners of the award are Kenny Dalglish and Karen Carney.

== List of winners ==
=== 1970s ===
Year	Winner(s)	Note
1974	(England) Bobby Charlton	First winners of the award
1974	(England) Cliff Lloyd	First winners of the award
1975	(Scotland) Denis Law	First winner of the award from outside England
1976	(England) George Eastham	
1977	(England) Jack Taylor	
1978	(Scotland) Bill Shankly	
1979	(England) Tom Finney	

=== 1980s ===
Year	Winner(s)	Notes
1980	(Scotland) Matt Busby	
1981	(England) John Trollope	
1982	(England) Joe Mercer	
1983	(England) Bob Paisley	
1984	(England) Bill Nicholson	
1985	(England) Ron Greenwood	
1986	England World Cup squad 1966	
1987	(England) Stanley Matthews	
1988	(England) Billy Bonds	
1989	(England) Nat Lofthouse	

=== 1990s ===
Year	Winner(s)	Notes
1990	(England) Peter Shilton	
1991	(Scotland) Tommy Hutchison	
1992	(England) Brian Clough	
1993	(England) Manchester United European Cup squad 1968	(Republic of Ireland) Shay Brennan and (Republic of Ireland) Tony Dunne; Joint first winner of the award from outside Great Britain; Joint first winner of the award from outside the United Kingdom
1993	(Portugal) Eusébio	Joint first winner of the award from outside Great Britain; Joint first winner of the award from outside the United Kingdom
1994	(Northern Ireland) Billy Bingham	
1995	(Scotland) Gordon Strachan	
1996	(Brazil) Pelé	First winner of the award from outside Europe
1997	(England) Peter Beardsley	
1998	(England) Steve Ogrizovic	
1999	(England) Tony Ford	

=== 2000s ===
Year	Winner(s)	Notes
2000	(England) Gary Mabbutt	
2001	(England) Jimmy Hill	
2002	(Republic of Ireland) Niall Quinn	
2003	(England) Bobby Robson	
2004	(Italy) Dario Gradi	
2005	(Trinidad and Tobago) Shaka Hislop	
2006	(Northern Ireland) George Best	
2007	(Scotland) Alex Ferguson	
2008	(England) Jimmy Armfield	
2009	(England) John McDermott	

=== 2010s ===
Year	Winner(s)	Notes
2010	(South Africa) Lucas Radebe	
2011	(England) Howard Webb	
2012	(Scotland) Graham Alexander	
2013	Manchester United Class of '92	
2014	(England) Donald Bell	
2015	(England) Steven Gerrard	
2015	(England) Frank Lampard	
2016	(Wales) Ryan Giggs	
2017	(England) David Beckham	
2018	(England) Cyrille Regis	
2019	(England) Steph Houghton	First female to receive award.

=== 2020s ===
Year	Winner(s)	Notes
2020	(England) Marcus Rashford	
2021	(England) Gordon Taylor	
2022	(England) Roy Hodgson	
2022	(England) Hope Powell	First time men's and women's PFA Merit awards were separated
2023	(England) Ian Wright	
2023	(England) Jill Scott	
2024	(England) Dean Lewington	
2024	(England) Fara Williams	
2025	(England) Gareth Southgate	
2025	(England) Emma Hayes	
2026	(Scotland) Kenny Dalglish	
2026	(England) Karen Carney	

== Breakdown of winners ==
=== Winners by country ===
Country	Number of wins
England	40
Scotland	8
Northern Ireland	2
Trinidad and Tobago	1
Italy	1
Republic of Ireland	1
Brazil	1
Portugal	1
South Africa	1
Wales	1
