= Albert Hammond (disambiguation) =

Albert Hammond (born 1944) is a Gibraltarian singer, songwriter, and record producer.

Albert Hammond may also refer to:

- Albert Hammond (album)
- Albert Hammond Jr. (born 1980), American guitarist, singer, songwriter and music producer, son of the Gibraltarian musician
- Albert Hammond (footballer) (1924–1989), English football inside forward
- Albert Hammond (Wisconsin politician) (1883–1968), American businessman and politician
