= Mark Wade (ventriloquist) =

American ventriloquist

Mark Wade is an American children's ventriloquist. He has performed and lectured internationally on the subject, and was named "Ventriloquist Of The Year" in 1980. He is the executive director of the Vent Haven International Ventriloquists' ConVENTion, and is the executive director of Maher Ventriloquist Studios, the oldest established ventriloquist studio that teaches the art of ventriloquism. Along with Ken Groves and Tom Crowl, Wade started the IVS (International Ventriloquist Society) in 2013. He has sat on the Board of Advisors for the Vent Haven Ventriloquist Museum since 2000.

Wade is the author of the books Kidshow Ventriloquism and Kidshow Ventriloquism Encore. He also writes for numerous magazines ("KidAbra Journal" and "Rubber Chicken" magazine in the UK) and is a comedy writer as well. He has written many scripts for other performers.

He resides now in Florida with his wife.
