= 1943–44 Blackpool F.C. season =

English football club season

Blackpool F.C.
1943–44 season
- Manager: Joe Smith
- League North: 1st (first competition); 7th (second competition)
- FA Cup: Competition suspended
- League War Cup: Finalists (Northern Section)
- Top goalscorer: League: All: Jock Dodds (23)
Home colours

The 1943–44 season was Blackpool F.C.'s fifth season in special wartime football during World War II. They competed in League North, finishing first in the first competition and seventh in the second. They were also losing finalists in the League War Cup Northern Section, Aston Villa beating them in the final.

Jock Dodds was the club's top scorer for the sixth consecutive season, with 23 goals in all competitions.
