= Jack Oakes =

English footballer

John Oakes
Personal information
- Full name: John Oakes
- Date of birth: 24 September 1905
- Place of birth: Winsford, England
- Date of death: 20 March 1992 (aged 86)
- Height: 5 ft 11 in (1.80 m)
- Position: Centre half

Senior career*
Years	Team	Apps	(Gls)
1929–1930	Nottingham Forest	2	(0)
1930–1931	Crook Town	?	(?)
1931–1932	Southend United	2	(0)
1932–1933	Crook Town	?	(?)
1933–1934	Spennymoor United	?	(37)
1934–1936	Aldershot	61	(19)
1936–1947	Charlton Athletic	130	(3)
1947–1948	Plymouth Argyle	36	(0)
Total		231	(22)
- * Club domestic league appearances and goals

John Oakes (24 September 1905 – 20 March 1992), was an English footballer who played as a centre half in the Football League.

His early career included playing for Nottingham Forest, Southend United and Crook Town. He joined Aldershot in May 1934 who for a period of time tried playing him as a centre-half in early 1935, making the switch permanent later that year.

In 1936, he transferred to Charlton Athletic and was on the losing side in the 1946 FA Cup Final. He did not make the line-up for Charlton's victorious 1947 FA Cup Final, and signed for Plymouth Argyle soon after, spending one season at Home Park before retiring in his 43rd year.

After his playing career was over, he emigrated to Australia, and was living in the city of Perth by the time of his death in March 1992 at the age of 86. Jack Oakes was a great-uncle of Roy Sandbach.

== Honours ==
Charlton Athletic

- FA Cup runner-up: 1945–46
