= James Fullwood =

English footballer

Personal information
- Date of birth: 17 February 1911
- Place of birth: Ilkeston, England
- Date of death: 1981 (aged 69–70)
- Height: 5 ft 11 in (1.80 m)
- Position: Left back

Senior career*
Years	Team	Apps	(Gls)
- Thorne Colliery
1934–1937	Tottenham Hotspur	34	(1)
1938–1939	Reading	44	(0)
- * Club domestic league appearances and goals

James Fullwood (17 February 1911 – 1981) was a professional footballer who played for Thorne Colliery, Tottenham Hotspur, and Reading.

== Football career ==
The left back began his career at Thorne Colliery. Fullwood joined Tottenham Hotspur in 1934 and played a total of 35 matches and scoring once in all competitions for the Lilywhites. After leaving White Hart Lane, Fullwood joined Reading where he went on to feature in a further 44 matches between 1938 and 1939.
