= Freddie Houldsworth =

English footballer

Personal information
- Full name: Frederick Charlton Houldsworth
- Date of birth: 29 May 1911
- Place of birth: Henley-on-Thames, England
- Date of death: 1994 (aged 82–83)
- Place of death: Warminster, England
- Position: Goalkeeper

Senior career*
Years	Team	Apps	(Gls)
–	Army		
1934–1935	Swindon Town	30	(0)
1935	Stoke City	2	(0)
1935–1938	Ipswich Town	0	(0)
1938–1939	Reading	8	(0)
1941–1944	Southampton		
- * Club domestic league appearances and goals

Frederick Charlton Houldsworth (29 May 1911 – 1994) was an English footballer who played in the Football League for Reading, Swindon Town and Stoke City.

== Career ==
Houldsworth was born in Henley-on-Thames and began his career with Swindon Town in 1934. He played 34 times for Swindon before joining Stoke City in April 1935. Whilst he kept a clean sheet against Grimsby Town in his first match for Stoke he conceded five against Preston North End and was not retained. He then joined Ipswich Town where he used as a reserve and left in 1938 for Reading without having made an appearance. At Reading he played in eight matches before he served with the Army during World War II. During the war he guested for Southampton, making 21 appearances in the War League and Cup matches between 1941 and 1944.

== Career statistics ==
Appearances and goals by club, season and competition
Club	Season	League			FA Cup		Total	
Club	Season	Division	Apps	Goals	Apps	Goals	Apps	Goals
Swindon Town	1934–35	Third Division South	30	0	4	0	34	0
Stoke City	1934–35	First Division	2	0	0	0	2	0
Reading	1938–39	Third Division South	8	0	0	0	8	0
Reading	1946–47	Third Division South	0	0	1	0	1	0
Career Total			40	0	5	0	45	0
