= Harold Hobbis =

English footballer

Personal information
- Date of birth: 9 March 1913
- Place of birth: Dartford, England
- Date of death: 17 May 1991 (aged 78)
- Place of death: Eastbourne, England
- Height: 5 ft 9 in (1.75 m)
- Position: Winger

Senior career*
| Years | Team | Apps | (Gls) |
| 1930–1931 | Bromley | ? | (?) |
| 1931–1948 | Charlton Athletic | 248 | (76) |
| 1948–1949 | Tonbridge Angels | ? | (?) |

International career
| 1936 | England | 2 | (1) |

Managerial career
- Tonbridge Angels
- * Club domestic league appearances and goals

Harold Henry Frederick Hobbis (9 March 1913 - 17 May 1991), was an English international footballer who played as a midfielder in the Football League. Playing most of his career for Charlton Athletic he also appeared as a guest player for West Ham United in World War II.
