= Joe Jobling =

English footballer

Personal information
- Full name: Joseph Jobling
- Date of birth: 29 July 1906
- Place of birth: Annfield Plain, England
- Date of death: 20 July 1969 (aged 62)
- Place of death: London, England
- Height: 5 ft 9 in (1.75 m)
- Position: Wing half

Senior career*
Years	Team	Apps	(Gls)
- Sunderland Co-operatives
- South Pontop Villa
- Langley Park
- Annfield Plain
- Gorleston
1929–1931	Norwich City	71	(1)
1931–1945	Charlton Athletic	211	(5)
1941	→ West Ham United (guest)	1	(0)

Managerial career
- 1956–1958: Gorleston
- * Club domestic league appearances and goals

Joseph Jobling (29 July 1906 – 20 July 1969) was an English professional footballer who played as a wing half in the Football League for Charlton Athletic and Norwich City. After retiring from football, he coached and scouted for Charlton Athletic. Between 1956 and 1958 he was manager of Gorleston.
