= Alex Muir (Albion Rovers footballer) =

Scottish footballer

Personal information
- Full name: Alexander Muir
- Place of birth: Scotland
- Position: Full back

Senior career*
Years	Team	Apps	(Gls)
–1941	Burnbank Athletic		
1941–1953	Albion Rovers	156	(11)
- * Club domestic league appearances and goals

Alexander Muir was a Scottish professional footballer who made over 150 appearances as a full back in the Scottish League for Albion Rovers.
