= Taffy O'Callaghan =

Welsh footballer

Personal information
- Full name: Eugene O'Callaghan
- Date of birth: 6 October 1906
- Date of death: 4 July 1956 (aged 49)
- Height: 5 ft 8 1/2 in (1.74 m)
- Position: Forward

Senior career*
Years	Team	Apps	(Gls)
1925	Ebbw Vale		
1925–1926	Tottenham Hotspur Reserves		
1927–1935	Tottenham Hotspur	252	(92)
1935–1937	Leicester City	84	(30)
1937–1939	Fulham	41	(6)

International career
1929–1934	Wales	11	(3)
- * Club domestic league appearances and goals

Eugene "Taffy" O'Callaghan (6 October 1906 – 4 July 1956) was a Welsh professional footballer who played as a forward for Tottenham Hotspur, Leicester City, Fulham and Wales during the 1920s and 1930s.

== Career ==
=== Club career ===
Taffy was born in Ebbw Vale, Wales and joined Tottenham Hotspur from Ebbw Vale in 1925, making his debut for the first team in January 1927 against Everton, having impressed with his two-footed play and accurate passing. Again in 1928 he impressed against Everton, scoring four goals in February of that year.

Taffy helped the team achieve promotion back to Football League First Division at the end of the 1932–33 season and in the following year was a key member of the side known as the 'greyhounds' as they played with speed and style. During his time at Spurs he made 252 league appearances scoring 93 goals and a further six in eleven FA Cup matches for the club.

He was transferred to Leicester City in March 1935 although playing once again for Tottenham as a 'guest' during the war years at the time when the Football League had been suspended. After the war he went on to a coaching role at Fulham.

=== International career ===
His first cap for Wales was won in May 1929 and he went on to play a further ten times at International level.

== Career statistics ==
=== International ===
As of match played 16 January 2023

Appearances and goals by national team and year
National team	Year	Apps	Goals
Wales	1929	2	1
Wales	1931	2	0
Wales	1932	3	2
Wales	1933	3	0
Wales	1934	1	0
Total		11	3

As of match played 16 January 2023

Wales score listed first, score column indicates score after each O'Callaghan goal

List of international goals scored by Taffy O'Callaghan
No.	Date	Venue	Cap	Opponent	Score	Result	Competition	Ref.
1	26 October 1929	Racecourse Ground, Wrexham, Wales	2	Scotland	1–2	2–4	1929–30 British Home Championship	
2	26 October 1932	Tynecastle Park, Edinburgh, Scotland	5	Scotland	3–0	5–2	1932–33 British Home Championship	
3	26 October 1932	Tynecastle Park, Edinburgh, Scotland	5	Scotland	5–0	5–2	1932–33 British Home Championship	
