= Pat Gallacher (footballer, born 1913) =

Scottish footballer

Personal information
- Full name: Patrick Gallacher
- Date of birth: 9 January 1913
- Place of birth: Springburn, Scotland
- Date of death: June 1983 (aged 70)
- Place of death: Hastings, England
- Height: 5 ft 10 in (1.78 m)
- Position: Inside forward

Youth career
- St Agnes Boys' Guild

Senior career*
Years	Team	Apps	(Gls)
- St Agnes Welfare
- Townhead Benburb
–1933	Dunoon Athletic		
1933–1934	Millwall	0	(0)
1934–1936	Third Lanark	65	(17)
1936–1937	Blackburn Rovers	11	(0)
1938–1948	Bournemouth & Boscombe Athletic	35	(3)
1948–1950	Weymouth		
1950–1951	Dundalk	12	(10)

Managerial career
- 1948–1950: Weymouth (player-manager)
- 1950–1951: Dundalk (player-manager)
- * Club domestic league appearances and goals

Patrick Gallacher (9 January 1913 – June 1983), sometimes known as Paddy Gallacher, was a Scottish professional footballer who played in the Football League for Bournemouth & Boscombe Athletic and Blackburn Rovers as an inside forward. He also played in the Scottish League for Third Lanark and served League of Ireland club Dundalk as player-manager.

== Personal life ==
Gallacher was an uncle of footballers Billy McPhail and John McPhail. After retiring from football, Gallacher settled in Bexhill-on-Sea and became an HGV driver, a job from which he retired in December 1977.

== Career statistics ==
Appearances and goals by club, season and competition
Club	Season	League			National Cup		Other		Total	
Club	Season	Division	Apps	Goals	Apps	Goals	Apps	Goals	Apps	Goals
Third Lanark	1934–35	Scottish Division Two	26	8	1	0	―		27	8
Third Lanark	1935–36	Scottish Division One	37	9	6	1	―		43	10
Third Lanark	1936–37	Scottish Division One	2	0	―		―		2	0
Third Lanark	Total		65	17	7	1	―		72	18
Dundalk	1950–51	League of Ireland	12	10	1	0	21 (Note: 9 appearances and 7 goals in League of Ireland Shield, 9 appearances and 2 goals in Dublin City Cup, 3 appearances and 2 goals in Leinster Senior Cup)	11	34	21
Career total			77	27	8	1	21	11	106	39

== Honours ==
Third Lanark

- Scottish League Division Two: 1934–35
- Scottish Cup: runner-up 1935–36

Weymouth

- Western League First Division third-place promotion: 1948–49

Dundalk

- Leinster Senior Cup: 1950–51
