= Dick Foss =

English footballer

Personal information
- Full name: Sidney Lacy Richard Foss
- Date of birth: 28 November 1912
- Place of birth: Barking, England
- Date of death: 3 August 1995 (aged 82)
- Place of death: Merton, England
- Height: 5 ft 6 in (1.68 m)
- Positions: Left half; inside left

Senior career*
Years	Team	Apps	(Gls)
1931–1932	Thames	0	(0)
1932–1933	Tottenham Hotspur	0	(0)
1933–1934	Enfield		
1934–1936	Southall		
1936–1948	Chelsea	41	(3)

Managerial career
- Chelsea Youth
- * Club domestic league appearances and goals

Sidney Lacy Richard Foss (28 November 1912 – 3 August 1995), commonly known as Dick Foss or Dickie Foss, was an English professional footballer who played as a left half in the Football League for Chelsea, with whom he had a 30-year association. He later served as youth team manager at the club.

== Personal life ==
Foss was in a reserved occupation during the Second World War. He was a member of the Police War Reserve and was called up prior to the commencement of hostilities.

== Career statistics ==
Appearances and goals by club, season and competition
Club	Season	League			FA Cup		Total	
Club	Season	Division	Apps	Goals	Apps	Goals	Apps	Goals
Chelsea	1936–37	First Division	4	0	0	0	4	0
Chelsea	1937–38	First Division	11	3	0	0	11	3
Chelsea	1938–39	First Division	11	0	0	0	11	0
Chelsea	1945–46	—			5	0	5	0
Chelsea	1946–47	First Division	12	0	0	0	12	0
Chelsea	1947–48	First Division	3	0	2	0	5	0
Career total			41	3	7	0	48	3
