= Edwin Cunningham (footballer) =

English footballer

Personal information
- Full name: Edwin Burnhope Cunningham
- Date of birth: 20 September 1919
- Place of birth: Jarrow, England
- Date of death: April 1993 (aged 73)
- Place of death: Burnhope, England
- Position: Outside forward

Senior career*
Years	Team	Apps	(Gls)
–1939	Luton Amateurs		
1939–1947	Bristol City	1	(0)
- * Club domestic league appearances and goals

Edwin Burnhope Cunningham (20 September 1919 – April 1993) was an English professional footballer who played as an outside forward in the Football League for Bristol City.
