= Roy Sandbach =

British chemist

Professor David Roy Sandbach OBE FRSC
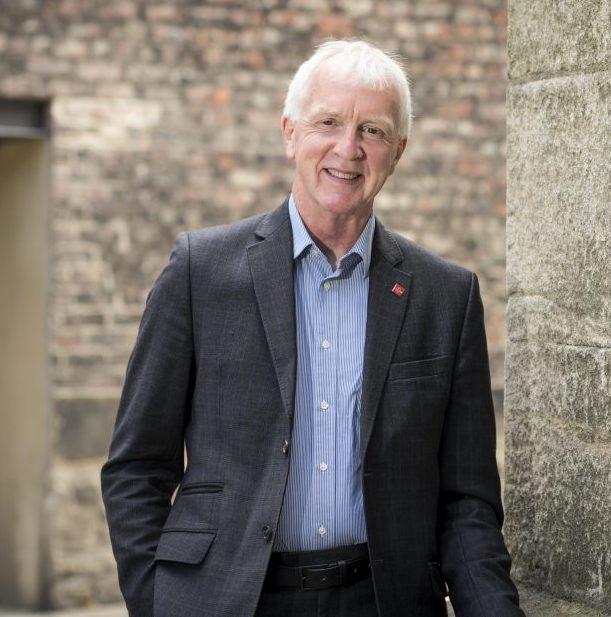
- Born: 20 May 1954 (age 72); Stockton-on-Tees, United Kingdom
- Title: Immediate Past-President, Royal Society of Chemistry Industry & Technology Division
- Board member of: Northern Accelerator (Chair) National Centre for Universities and Business; Technology Services Association Centre for Life, Newcastle

Academic background
- Education: St. Aidan's Grammar School, Sunderland
- Alma mater: Imperial College (B.Sc., 1975); Newcastle University (Ph.D, 1978)

Academic work
- Main interests: Innovation Management, Chemistry, Science Impact, Ageing, Regional Economic Development

Professor David Roy Sandbach OBE FRSC (born 20 May 1954, Stockton-on-Tees) is the Immediate Past-President of the Industry and Technology Division of the Royal Society of Chemistry (RSC)... In addition, he sits on the board of the National Centre for Universities and Business (NCUB). He has chaired Northern Accelerator, the research commercialisation programme for the North East England universities, Newcastle University, Durham University, Northumbria University Sunderland University, and Teesside University. Until January 2026, Sandbach was Interim-Chair of the Technology Services Association (TSA), the national body promoting technology-enabled care. He remains on the TSA Board. He is vice-Chair of the Sunderland Ageing Well Board.

Sandbach is a Trustee with the Reece Foundation He is a Member with Wise Academies, a Multi-Academy Trust, & was a founding governor with The Beacon of Light School, an alternative provision school, both in Sunderland. He is a trustee with the Laidlaw Schools Trust. He is a member of the Board of Sunderland Culture. Sandbach is a Founding Member of MarketingKind, a community intending to use marketing for global social value. He lives near Kelso in the Scottish Borders, where he chairs the Four Border Abbeys U3A.

== Education ==
Roy Sandbach was educated at St. Aidan's Grammar School (now St Aidan's Catholic Academy) in Sunderland, UK (1964–72). He read Chemistry at Imperial College, London (1972–75), graduating with a B.Sc. (1st class honours). He completed a Ph.D in Electrochemistry at Newcastle University (1975–78).

== Career ==
=== Research Management ===
Sandbach worked initially for ICI (Imperial Chemical Industries) Mond Division, as a research electrochemist (1978–81). He joined Procter & Gamble in 1981 and had a 31 year R&D management career with the P&G Company (1981-2012), located in Newcastle, Frankfurt, Rome and Brussels. He was recognised in 1994 as P&G Research Fellow, as one of the Company's most senior R&D scientists. His work crossed the boundaries of the major Company business sectors. He has nine patents, one of which is the basis for a $150 million business in the United States.
Sandbach maintains his broad scientific interest through membership of the Advisory Board for the Faculty of Science, Agriculture & Engineering at Newcastle University. While at P&G, Sandbach was recognised with visiting Professorships at Central St. Martins (2007) and Cranfield University (2009), both in Innovation Management.
In 2010/11, Sandbach was part of the multi-disciplinary Manchester Developmental Panel, examining routes to strengthen Greater Manchester's economic base through science, innovation and R&D.
Sandbach retired from P&G in 2012.

=== North East Regional Innovation Leadership ===
In 2013, Sandbach became the 10th David Goldman visiting Professor at Newcastle University Business School (NUBS). This endowed appointment is awarded each year to a leading entrepreneur or business leader from within the region, to provide inspiration and motivation to budding entrepreneurs and business leaders. He maintained involvement with NUBS and currently sits on the International Advisory Board at the Business School. He also sits on the advisory board at Newcastle Business School at Northumbria University.
During 2013, Sandbach led, in a voluntary capacity, the development of regional innovation strategy for the North East Local Enterprise Partnership (NELEP). This strategy was included in the 2014 North East Strategic Economic Plan. Subsequently, later in 2014, Sandbach was appointed Chair of the NELEP Innovation Board. He stayed in this role until 2017.
Sandbach chaired the Strategic Advisory Board for Northern Accelerator, the well-established collaboration between five North East universities (Durham, Newcastle, Northumbria, Sunderland, Teesside). It has the objective to commercialise research and boost the region’s economy. It was initially funded with £8.5 million from Research England's Connecting Capabilities Fund

=== Ageing Innovation Leadership ===
From 2015 to 2018, Sandbach was appointed Professor of Practice in Ageing Science & Innovation and first Director of the National Innovation Centre for Ageing at Newcastle University (NICA). It delivers new products & services to meet the needs of an ageing demographic across the globe and leverages the outstanding ageing-relevant research base within the UK, and notably at Newcastle University.
Sandbach has remained involved with research and innovation in the ageing domain. He continues as a visiting professor at Newcastle University's NICA. He is Finance Committee Chair for the Technology Services Association, the national body promoting technology applications in the care sector, and is vice-chair of the Sunderland Ageing Well Board.

== Awards and honours ==
Honoured with the OBE (Officer of the Order of the British Empire) in the 2017 Birthday Honours for services to science, innovation & skills.
Recognised as Fellow of the Royal Society of Chemistry (FRSC) in 2013 and elected as President of the Industry and Technology Division of the Society in 2017. His term ended in June 2020. He remains involved with the RSC. He has chaired an RSC-led Industry Task Force for the development of Sustainable Polymers inLiquid Formulations (PLFs). This initiative has developed strongly, with global cross-industry and academic support.
