= Alec Roxburgh =

English footballer (1910 – 1985)

Personal information
- Full name: Alexander White Roxburgh
- Date of birth: 19 September 1910
- Place of birth: Manchester, England
- Date of death: 5 December 1985 (aged 75)
- Place of death: Prestwich, England
- Height: 6 ft 1 3/4 in (1.87 m)
- Position: Goalkeeper

Senior career*
Years	Team	Apps	(Gls)
- Nuneaton Town
1928	Manchester City	0	(0)
- St Annes & South Shore Wednesday
1931–1938	Blackpool	62	(0)
1946–1947	Barrow	69	(0)
1948–1949	Hyde United	27	(0)

International career
1943	England (wartime)	1	(0)
- * Club domestic league appearances and goals

Alexander White Roxburgh (19 September 1910 – 5 December 1985) was an English professional footballer who played as a goalkeeper in the Football League for Barrow and Blackpool. He was capped by England during the Second World War.

== Career statistics ==
Appearances and goals by club, season and competition
Club	Season	League			FA Cup		Other		Total	
Club	Season	Division	Apps	Goals	Apps	Goals	Apps	Goals	Apps	Goals
Hyde United	1948–49	Cheshire League	27	0	1	0	9 (Note: 4 appearances in Cheshire Senior Cup, 3 appearances in Ashton Charity Challenge Cup, 3 appearances in Cheshire League Challenge Cup)	0	37	0
Career total			27	0	1	0	9	0	37	0
