= Harry Thompson (footballer, born 1915) =

English footballer and manager

Personal information
- Date of birth: 29 April 1915
- Place of birth: Mansfield, Nottinghamshire, England
- Date of death: 29 January 2000 (aged 84)
- Positions: Inside forward; wing-half

Senior career*
Years	Team	Apps	(Gls)
- Mansfield Town
- Wolverhampton Wanderers
1938–1939	Sunderland	14	(1)

Managerial career
- 1949–1958: Oxford United
- * Club domestic league appearances and goals

Harry Thompson (29 April 1915 – 29 January 2000) was an English professional footballer who played for Mansfield Town, Wolves and Sunderland. He later became the first professional manager of Oxford United.

== Playing career ==
Born in Mansfield in 1915, Harry played for his local side Mansfield Town before joining Wolves. Later in his career, he signed for Sunderland for £7,500. After making 14 appearances for the Black Cats, including an FA Cup semi-final, Thompson retired from football.

== Managerial career ==
In 1949 Thompson was signed as Oxford United manager. He managed the club for nine years, winning the Southern League and the Southern League Cup twice. They also reached the fourth round of the FA Cup.

== Honours ==
Oxford United

- Southern League: 1953
- Southern League Cup: 1953, 1954
