= Peter Croker =

English footballer (1921–2011)

Personal information
- Full name: Peter Harry Lewis Croker
- Date of birth: 21 December 1921
- Place of birth: Kingston upon Thames, England
- Date of death: 7 December 2011 (aged 89)
- Place of death: Bexley, England
- Position: Full back

Youth career
- Kingston YMCA
- Leyland Motors
- Kingston-upon-Thames
- 1940–1941: Charlton Athletic

Senior career*
Years	Team	Apps	(Gls)
- Bromley
- Charlton Rovers
1941–1952	Charlton Athletic	59	(0)
- → Bromley (guest)
1945	→ Brentford (guest)	1	(0)
1952–1953	Watford	23	(0)
- Gravesend & Northfleet
- Harvey Sports
–1956	Greenwich		

Managerial career
- 1965–1966: Charlton Athletic (assistant)
- * Club domestic league appearances and goals

Peter Harry Lewis Croker (21 December 1921 – 7 December 2011) was an English footballer, who played as a full-back in the Football League for Charlton Athletic and Watford and in non-league football for Bromley and Gravesend & Northfleet. Prior to his death, he was the last survivor from Charlton's 1947 FA Cup Final-winning team. He missed the 1946 FA Cup Final through injury.

== Coaching and administrative career ==
Beginning in 1956, Croker served Charlton Athletic as youth team manager, scout and assistant manager. He also scouted for Blackpool and Sunderland and later became chairman of the South East Counties League.

== Personal life ==
His great-nephew Eric Dier is also a professional footballer. His brother Ted Croker was the secretary of The Football Association between 1973 and 1989. At the time of his retirement in May 1994, Croker had been working as a solicitor. Peter Croker died at age 89.

== Honours ==
Charlton Athletic

- FA Cup: 1946–47
