= Bobby Russell (footballer, born 1919) =

Scottish footballer

Personal information
- Full name: Robert Inglis Russell
- Date of birth: 27 December 1919
- Place of birth: Aberdour, Scotland
- Date of death: 26 March 2004 (aged 84)
- Place of death: Dunfermline, Scotland
- Position: Wing half

Senior career*
Years	Team	Apps	(Gls)
–1938	Cleland St Mary's		
1938–1944	Airdrieonians	24	(11)
1944–1948	Chelsea	2	(0)
1948	Notts County	2	(0)
	Leyton Orient	0	(0)
- * Club domestic league appearances and goals

Robert Inglis Russell (27 December 1919 – 26 March 2004) was a Scottish professional footballer who played in the Scottish League for Airdrieonians as a wing half. He also appeared in the Football League for Chelsea and Notts County.

== Career statistics ==
Appearances and goals by club, season and competition
Club	Season	League			National Cup		Total	
Club	Season	Division	Apps	Goals	Apps	Goals	Apps	Goals
Airdrieonians	1938–39	Scottish Division Two	24	11	2	0	26	11
Chelsea	1945–46	—			2	0	2	0
Chelsea	1946–47	First Division	2	0	0	0	2	0
Chelsea	Total		2	0	2	0	4	0
Career total			26	11	4	0	30	11
