= Albert Baynham =

English footballer

Personal information
- Full name: Albert John Baynham
- Date of birth: 25 September 1875
- Place of birth: Smethwick, England
- Date of death: 1951 (aged 75–76)
- Position: Winger

Senior career*
Years	Team	Apps	(Gls)
1902–1903	Halesowen		
1903–1907	Wolverhampton Wanderers	71	(2)
Total		71	(2)
- * Club domestic league appearances and goals

Albert John Baynham (25 September 1875 – 1951) was an English footballer who played in the Football League for Wolverhampton Wanderers.
