= Charlie Leyfield =

English footballer (1911–1982)

Personal information
- Full name: Charles Leyfield
- Date of birth: 30 October 1911
- Place of birth: Chester, England
- Date of death: 1 April 1982 (aged 70)
- Height: 5 ft 7 in (1.70 m)
- Position: Outside forward

Senior career*
Years	Team	Apps	(Gls)
1926–1930	Brickfield Athletic		
1930–1936	Everton	38	(13)
1937–1938	Sheffield United	36	(13)
1938–1939	Doncaster Rovers	28	(11)

International career
1935	Football League XI	1	(1)
- * Club domestic league appearances and goals

Charles Leyfield (30 October 1911 – 1 April 1982) was an English professional footballer who played as an outside forward in the Football League for Everton, Sheffield United and Doncaster Rovers. After his retirement, he worked as a trainer for Wrexham, Wales, Everton and scouted for Preston North End and Tranmere Rovers.

== Personal life ==
Before becoming a professional footballer, Leyfield worked as a joiner. He served in the Royal Artillery during the Second World War. After leaving football, Leyfield ran pubs in Saltney and Guilden Sutton. He died of a heart attack in 1982, aged 70.

== Career statistics ==
Appearances and goals by club, season and competition
Club	Season	League			FA Cup		Total	
Club	Season	Division	Apps	Goals	Apps	Goals	Apps	Goals
Everton	1934–35	First Division	11	7	0	0	11	7
Everton	1935–36	First Division	17	5	0	0	17	5
Everton	1936–37	First Division	10	1	0	0	10	1
Career total			38	13	0	0	38	13

== Honours ==
- Chester & Wirral Football League Hall of Fame
