= George Taylor (footballer, born 1909) =

English footballer

Personal information
- Full name: George Taylor
- Date of birth: 23 April 1909
- Place of birth: Ashton-under-Lyne, Scotland
- Position: Left half

Senior career*
Years	Team	Apps	(Gls)
1930–1945	Bolton Wanderers	220	(3)
1943	→ Brentford (guest)	1	(0)

International career
- England Schoolboys
- * Club domestic league appearances and goals

George Taylor (born 23 April 1909) was an English professional football left half who made 220 appearances in the Football League for Bolton Wanderers. He was a reserve for England's 7–0 British Home Championship win over Ireland on 16 November 1938. After his retirement, he served Bolton Wanderers as head coach under Bill Ridding.
