= George Little (footballer) =

English footballer (1915–2002)

Personal information
- Full name: George Little
- Date of birth: 1 December 1915
- Place of birth: Newcastle upon Tyne, England
- Date of death: March 2002 (aged 86)
- Place of death: Doncaster, South Yorkshire, England
- Height: 5 ft 9 in (1.75 m)
- Position: Winger

Senior career*
Years	Team	Apps	(Gls)
- Throckley Welfare
1936–1947	Doncaster Rovers	49	(11)
1947–1948	York City	15	(2)
1948–1949	Scunthorpe & Lindsey United		
1949–1950	Frickley Colliery		
1950–	Worksop Town		
Total		64	(13)
- * Club domestic league appearances and goals

George Little (1 December 1915 – March 2002) was an English professional footballer who played as a winger in the Football League for Doncaster Rovers and York City, in non-League football for Throckley Welfare, Scunthorpe United, Frickley Colliery and Worksop Town.
