= Les Gaunt =

English footballer

Personal information
- Full name: Leslie Gaunt
- Date of birth: 3 January 1918
- Place of birth: Leeds, England
- Date of death: 24 July 1985 (aged 67)
- Place of death: Perth, Australia
- Height: 5 ft 9 in (1.75 m)
- Position: Right back

Youth career
- 1934–1935: Leeds United

Senior career*
Years	Team	Apps	(Gls)
1935–1947	Leeds United	33	(0)
1947–1950	Reading	71	(0)
- Newbury Town

International career
	England Schoolboys	2	

Managerial career
- Newbury Town
- * Club domestic league appearances and goals

Leslie Gaunt (3 January 1918 – 24 July 1985), known prior to 1948 as Leslie Goldberg, was an English professional footballer who played as a right back. The first Jewish player to play for England schoolboys, he went on to play in the Football League for Leeds United and Reading. After retiring from playing, he managed Newbury Town, scouted for Oxford United and worked in a scouting and administrative capacity for Reading.

== Early life ==
Gaunt was born Leslie Goldberg in Leeds in 1918 to a Russian Jewish immigrant family. His father was a boot riveter. He attended the Lovell Road School, where he became the star player of the school's football team, single-handedly leading it to the final of the Leeds Schools Cup in 1933, although he was ill on the day of the final and missed the match. The previous year he had been picked for England schoolboys for a game against Wales at Wembley Stadium, and also played against Scotland, as well as captaining the Yorkshire Schoolboys team. After signing for Leeds as an amateur, he joined the club's ground staff in 1934, and signed as a professional the following year. He made his debut in 1937, replacing Bert Sproston in the team. However, after he had made 21 league appearances, the Football League was suspended when World War II broke out.

During the war he guested for Leeds, as well as Aldershot Town, Arsenal, Brentford and Reading, and served in the army in India. Returning to England, he was stationed in Hythe, where he met his future wife Peggy. After the war he returned to Leeds, but saw his opportunities limited by Eddie Bannister and Jim Milburn. In 1947 he was transferred to Reading. After starting to experience antisemitism on a regular basis, he changed his surname to Gaunt by deed poll in 1948. In 1950 he broke his leg in a game against Norwich City, an injury which ended his playing career after 71 league appearances for Reading.

After leaving Reading he managed Newbury Town, worked as a scout for Reading and Oxford United, and returned to Reading in 1969 as an assistant to manager Jack Mansell. He also started working for Crimpy Crisps, becoming a sales manager for the London and south-east region and ran a restaurant.

He died in Perth, Australia in 1985 at the age of 67.

== Career statistics ==
Appearances and goals by club, season and competition
Club	Season	League			FA Cup		Total	
Club	Season	Division	Apps	Goals	Apps	Goals	Apps	Goals
Leeds United	1937–38	First Division	3	0	0	0	3	0
Leeds United	1938–39	First Division	16	0	0	0	16	0
Leeds United	1946–47	First Division	14	0	0	0	14	0
Career total			33	0	0	0	33	0
