= Arthur Stevens (English footballer) =

English footballer

Personal information
- Full name: Arthur Harold Stevens
- Date of birth: 13 January 1921
- Place of birth: Wandsworth, England
- Date of death: 15 January 2007 (aged 86)
- Position: Outside right

Senior career*
Years	Team	Apps	(Gls)
–	Wimbledon		
–	Brentford		
–	Sutton United		
1941–1959	Fulham	386	(110)

Managerial career
- 1964–1965: Fulham (caretaker manager)
- * Club domestic league appearances and goals

Arthur Stevens (13 January 1921 – 15 January 2007) was an English footballer who scored 110 goals from 386 games in the Football League playing as an outside right for Fulham. Although outside right was his primary position, Arthur Stevens would regularly switch to any other of the forward positions with equal success. A genuine utility striker. Arthur was also Fulham’s designated penalty taker, rarely failing.

Stevens was born in Wandsworth, London, and played for Wimbledon before the Second World War and for Brentford and Sutton United in its early years, before joining Fulham as an amateur in 1941 and signing professional forms two years later. He represented England it seems in some wartime exhibition games. Nicknamed "Pablo", he played regularly after the war, and was a part of the side that won the Second Division championship in the 1948–49 season. A skilful, pacy player, described by Fulham and England player George Cohen as "one of the most skillful players he ever came across, as good as Stanley Matthews", Stevens was the third Fulham player to score 100 goals for the club, reaching a total of 124 from 413 games in all competitions, and remains (as of 2012) the club's highest scorer in the FA Cup. After playing his last game in the 1958–59 season, he remained with the club as a coach, and acted as caretaker manager for five weeks from mid-December 1964 to Vic Buckingham's appointment in January 1965, when Stevens left the club.

During the war he served in the artillery, including at the D-Day landings; he was a part of a group giving machine-gun support to the company led by Fulham's Major Jim Tompkins in the action in which Tompkins was killed.
