= Reg Saphin =

English footballer and trainer

Personal information
- Full name: Reginald Francis Edward Saphin
- Date of birth: 8 August 1916
- Place of birth: Kilburn, England
- Date of death: 23 December 2005 (aged 89)
- Place of death: Tunbridge Wells, England
- Position: Goalkeeper

Youth career
- Neasden
- –1935: Hayes

Senior career*
Years	Team	Apps	(Gls)
1935–1937	Hayes		
1937–1945	Walthamstow Avenue		
- → Metropolitan Police (guest)
1943	→ Brentford (guest)	0	(0)
1945	→ Ipswich Town (guest)	3	(0)
1946–1951	Queens Park Rangers	30	(0)
1951–1954	Watford	57	(0)
- * Club domestic league appearances and goals

Reginald Francis Edward Saphin (8 August 1916 – 23 December 2005) was an English professional footballer who played in the Football League for Watford and Queens Park Rangers as a goalkeeper. He later served Watford as assistant trainer and assistant youth team trainer.

== Career statistics ==
Appearances and goals by club, season and competition
Club	Season	League			FA Cup		Total	
Club	Season	Division	Apps	Goals	Apps	Goals	Apps	Goals
Ipswich Town (guest)	1945–46	—			3	0	3	0
Queens Park Rangers	1946–47	Third Division South	1	0	1	0	2	0
Queens Park Rangers	1947–48	Third Division South	8	0	0	0	8	0
Queens Park Rangers	1949–50	Second Division	1	0	0	0	1	0
Queens Park Rangers	1950–51	Second Division	20	0	0	0	1	0
Queens Park Rangers	Total		30	0	1	0	31	0
Watford	1951–52	Third Division South	17	0	0	0	17	0
Watford	1952–53	Third Division South	1	0	0	0	1	0
Watford	Total		18	0	0	0	18	0
Career Total			48	0	4	0	53	0
