= Les Henley =

English footballer and manager

Personal information
- Full name: Leslie Henley
- Date of birth: 26 September 1922
- Place of birth: Lambeth, London, England
- Date of death: 1996 (aged 73–74)
- Position: Wing half

Senior career*
Years	Team	Apps	(Gls)
1939–1940	Nunhead	0	(0)
1940–1946	Arsenal	0	(0)
1944–1945	→ West Ham United (guest)	0	(0)
1946–1953	Reading	181	(29)

Managerial career
- Bohemians
- 1955–1971: Wimbledon
- * Club domestic league appearances and goals

Leslie Henley (26 September 1922 – 1996) was an English footballer and manager.

== Career ==
=== Playing ===
Born in Lambeth, London, Henley started his career with non-league Nunhead during the 1939–40 season before joining Arsenal in September 1940. He played 92 wartime matches for the club, scoring 15 goals – his only competitive game for the senior side being an FA Cup match against West Ham United in 1946. During this time he also guested for West Ham United in 1944–45. In December 1946 he joined Reading, and there he made 181 appearances and scored 29 goals in the league.

=== Managerial ===
He managed Bohemians after leaving Reading. He managed from Wimbledon 1955 until 1971.
