= Dick Jales =

English footballer

Personal information
- Full name: Richard Alexander Jales
- Date of birth: 3 April 1922
- Place of birth: Chiswick, England
- Date of death: July 2004 (aged 82)
- Place of death: Leicester, England
- Positions: Left back; left half

Senior career*
Years	Team	Apps	(Gls)
–1946	Bradford City	0	(0)
1946–1951	Aldershot	78	(1)
- Rye United
- * Club domestic league appearances and goals

Richard Alexander Jales (3 April 1922 – July 2004) was an English professional football left back and left half who played in the Football League for Aldershot.
