= Johnny Deakin =

Scottish footballer

Personal information
- Position: Inside forward

Youth career
- Johnstone Burgh

Senior career*
| Years | Team | Apps | (Gls) |
| 1937–1950 | St Mirren | 105 | (16) |
| 1950–1951 | Clyde | 17 | (8) |
| 1951–1952 | Linfield | 10 | (2) |
| 1952 | Bangor | 12 | (3) |
| 1952–1955 | Glentoran | 26 | (6) |
| Total | | 170 | (35) |

International career
| 1946 | Scotland | 1 | (0) |
- * Club domestic league appearances and goals

Johnny Deakin was a Scottish footballer, who played for St Mirren, Clyde, Linfield, Bangor, Glentoran and Scotland.
