= Albert Hammond (footballer) =

English footballer

Personal information
- Full name: Albert William Arthur Hammond
- Date of birth: 5 February 1924
- Place of birth: Hanwell, England
- Date of death: 14 February 1989 (aged 65)
- Place of death: Gravesend, England
- Position: Inside forward

Senior career*
Years	Team	Apps	(Gls)
1940–1944	Queens Park Rangers	0	(0)
1944–1946	Brentford	0	(0)
1946–1947	Exeter City	2	(0)
1947–	Hastings United		
–1963	Hanwell Town		
- * Club domestic league appearances and goals

Albert William Arthur Hammond (5 February 1924 – 14 February 1989) was an English professional footballer who played as an inside forward in the Football League for Exeter City. He began his career during the Second World War as an amateur with Queens Park Rangers and moved across London to join Brentford in 1944. Hammond turned professional in 1946 and transferred to Exeter City.
