= Ralph Cowan (footballer) =

Scottish footballer

Personal information
- Place of birth: Scotland
- Position(s): Full back

Senior career*
Years	Team	Apps	(Gls)
1938–1945	Rangers	1	(0)
1946	Dumbarton		
1946–1947	Stirling Albion	10	(0)
- * Club domestic league appearances and goals

Ralph Cowan was a Scottish professional footballer who played as a full back in the Scottish League for Stirling Albion and Rangers.
