= Jimmy Anderson (footballer, born 1913) =

English footballer

Personal information
- Full name: James Anderson
- Date of birth: 25 July 1913
- Place of birth: Gateshead, England
- Date of death: January 1993 (aged 79)
- Place of death: Newcastle upon Tyne, England
- Position: Left back

Senior career*
Years	Team	Apps	(Gls)
1932–1933	Blyth Spartans		
1933	Darlington	0	(0)
1933–1934	Wigan Athletic	10	(0)
1934–1935	Blyth Spartans		
1935–1939	Queen of the South	91	(1)
1939–1946	Brentford	0	(0)
1946–1947	Carlisle United	11	(0)
- Queen of the South
- * Club domestic league appearances and goals

James Anderson (25 July 1913 – January 1993) was an English professional football left back who played in the Scottish League for Queen of the South, whom he also served as trainer after his retirement as a player. He also played for Wigan Athletic, playing 10 games for the club in the Cheshire League.

== Career statistics ==
Appearances and goals by club, season and competition
Club	Season	League			National Cup		Total	
Club	Season	Division	Apps	Goals	Apps	Goals	Apps	Goals
Queen of the South	1935–36	Scottish First Division	5	1	0	0	5	1
Queen of the South	1936–37	Scottish First Division	10	0	1	0	11	0
Queen of the South	1937–38	Scottish First Division	38	0	1	0	39	1
Queen of the South	1938–39	Scottish First Division	38	0	3	0	41	0
Career total			91	1	5	0	96	1
