= Bill Mason (footballer) =

English footballer

Personal information
- Full name: William Sidney Mason
- Date of birth: 31 October 1908
- Place of birth: Earlsfield, England
- Date of death: 1995 (aged 86–87)
- Height: 5 ft 11 in (1.80 m)
- Position: Goalkeeper

Senior career*
| Years | Team | Apps | (Gls) |
| 1926–1928 | Wimbledon | | |
| 1928–1929 | Fulham | 33 | (0) |
| 1933–1944 | Queens Park Rangers | 154 | (0) |
- * Club domestic league appearances and goals

William Sidney Mason (31 October 1908 – 1995) was an English professional footballer who played in the Football League for Queens Park Rangers and Fulham as a goalkeeper.

== Career statistics ==
Appearances and goals by club, season and competition
| Club | Season | League | | | FA Cup | | Other | | Total | |
| Club | Season | Division | Apps | Goals | Apps | Goals | Apps | Goals | Apps | Goals |
|---|---|---|---|---|---|---|---|---|---|---|
| Queens Park Rangers | 1933–34 | Third Division South | 8 | 0 | 0 | 0 | 2 (Note: Appearance(s) in Third Division South Cup) | 0 | 10 | 0 |
| Queens Park Rangers | 1934–35 | Third Division South | 32 | 0 | 2 | 0 | 4 | 0 | 36 | 0 |
| Queens Park Rangers | 1935–36 | Third Division South | 36 | 0 | 1 | 0 | 1 | 0 | 38 | 0 |
| Queens Park Rangers | 1936–37 | Third Division South | 42 | 0 | 3 | 0 | 1 | 0 | 46 | 0 |
| Queens Park Rangers | 1937–38 | Third Division South | 21 | 0 | 0 | 0 | 1 | 0 | 22 | 0 |
| Queens Park Rangers | 1938–39 | Third Division South | 15 | 0 | 0 | 0 | 2 (Note: 1 appearance in Third Division South Cup, 1 appearance in Football League Jubilee Fund) | 0 | 17 | 0 |
| Career total | | | 154 | 0 | 6 | 0 | 11 | 0 | 171 | 0 |
