= Cliff Lloyd =

Welsh footballer (1916–2000)

Clifford Lloyd OBE (14 November 1916 – 10 January 2000) was a football player who grew up in Helsby, Cheshire, in England. Cliff was born on 14 November 1916 and was the 4th son of Florence and Thomas Lloyd. He left school at 14 years old, becoming a forklift truck driver at the British Insulated Callenders Cables Works (BICC) in Helsby. Cliff lived and breathed football and joined the BICC football team. In 1936, a Liverpool scout signed him as a professional footballer.

In 1936, Lloyd was signed for Liverpool, but did not make an appearance for the side. When the war broke in 1939, Lloyd joined the Army. He made guest appearances for Wrexham, Brentford and Fulham, signing for the Cottagers when the war ended. He briefly managed Lisleby, before returning to Wrexham. He was a secretary of the club from 1949 to 1973, and also managed them from 1955 to 1957, with caretaker spells in 1950, 1959, 1965, and 1967.

Within the PFA, he was secretary (later chief executive) of the players' trade union from 1953 to 1981, with Gordon Taylor replacing him in the role. His most significant contribution in the role came in 1963, when he served as a witness in the High Court, regarding the transfer of George Eastham, who successfully challenged the League's retain and transfer system, and made it possible for players to move at the end of their contracts.

In recognition of his work with the PFA, Lloyd was appointed an Officer of the Order of the British Empire (OBE) in the 1975 Birthday Honours.
