= Ken Groves =

English footballer (1921–2002)

Personal information
- Full name: Kenneth Ernest Leonard Groves
- Date of birth: 9 October 1921
- Place of birth: Eton, England
- Date of death: May 2002 (aged 80)
- Place of death: Windsor, England
- Position: Goalkeeper

Senior career*
Years	Team	Apps	(Gls)
–1939	Windsor & Eton		
1939–1946	Preston North End	0	(0)
1940–1941	→ Southport (guest)	14	(0)
1946–1947	Reading	4	(0)
- * Club domestic league appearances and goals

Kenneth Ernest Leonard Groves (9 October 1921 – May 2002) was an English professional footballer who played as a goalkeeper in the Football League for Reading.
