= 1943–44 in English football =

Football in England
- Season: 1943–44

Men's football
- Football League: not held
- FA Cup: not held

The 1943–44 season was the fifth season of special wartime football in England during the Second World War.

== Overview ==
Between 1939 and 1946 normal competitive football was suspended in England. Many footballers signed up to fight in the war and as a result many teams were depleted, and fielded guest players instead. The Football League and FA Cup were suspended and in their place regional league competitions were set up. Appearances in these tournaments do not count in players' official records.

== Honours ==
League competition was split into three regional leagues, South, West and North. Many fixtures were unfulfilled.

Competition	Winner
League South	Tottenham Hotspur
League West	Lovell's Athletic
League North	Blackpool (First Championship); Bath City (Second Championship)
League North Cup	Wrexham
Football League War Cup	Aston Villa (Northern Section); Charlton Athletic (Southern Section); Villa and Charlton drew 1–1 in a playoff.

== See also ==
- England national football team results (unofficial matches)
