= Allenby Driver =

English footballer (1918–1997)

Personal information
- Date of birth: 29 September 1918
- Place of birth: Blackwell, Derbyshire, England
- Date of death: 31 March 1997 (aged 78)
- Position: Inside forward

Youth career
- Notts Boys
- Mansfield Boys
- Mansfield Shoe Co
- Clipstone

Senior career*
Years	Team	Apps	(Gls)
1936–1946	Sheffield Wednesday	6	(3)
1945	→ Chelmsford City (guest)	4	(2)
1946–1948	Luton Town	41	(13)
1948–1950	Norwich City	49	(19)
1950–1952	Ipswich Town	85	(25)
1952–1953	Walsall	26	(2)
1953–1953	Corby Town		
1953–1954	Scarborough		
1954	Frickley Colliery		
- * Club domestic league appearances and goals

Allenby Driver (29 September 1918 – 31 March 1997) was an English professional footballer who played as an inside forward in the Football League for Sheffield Wednesday, Luton Town, Norwich City, Ipswich Town and Walsall. He began his career professional career at Sheffield Wednesday but the outbreak of war interrupted his progress, he later played for Frickley Colliery.
