= Johnny Baynham =

Welsh footballer

Personal information
- Full name: John Baynham
- Date of birth: 21 April 1918
- Place of birth: Ystrad, Wales
- Date of death: February 1995 (aged 76)
- Place of death: Hillingdon, England
- Height: 5 ft 6 in (1.68 m)
- Position: Outside forward

Senior career*
Years	Team	Apps	(Gls)
c. 1939	Acton United		
1944–1946	Brentford	0	(0)
1946–1948	Leyton Orient	60	(7)
1948–1949	Swindon Town	4	(1)
1949–1952	Guildford City		
1952–1953	Dartford		
1953	Dover		
1953	Snowdown Colliery Welfare		

Managerial career
- c. 1957: Chesham United
- Uxbridge
- * Club domestic league appearances and goals

John Baynham (21 April 1918 – February 1995) was a Welsh professional footballer who played as an outside forward in the Football League for Leyton Orient and Swindon Town. He later managed non-League clubs Chesham United and Uxbridge.

== Career statistics ==
Appearances and goals by club, season and competition
Club	Season	League			FA Cup		Total	
Club	Season	Division	Apps	Goals	Apps	Goals	Apps	Goals
Swindon Town	1948–49	Third Division South	4	1	0	0	4	1
Career total			4	1	0	0	4	1
