= 1938–39 Brentford F.C. season =

English football team season

Brentford
1938–39 season
- Chairman: Louis P. Simon
- Manager: Harry Curtis
- Stadium: Griffin Park
- First Division: 18th
- FA Cup: Third round
- Top goalscorer: League: Cheetham (8); All: Cheetham (8)
- Highest home attendance: 38,535
- Lowest home attendance: 12,761
- Average home league attendance: 23,117
Home colours

During the 1938–39 English football season, Brentford competed in the Football League First Division. A six-match unbeaten run in February and March 1939 pulled the club clear of a near-certain relegation.

== Season summary ==
After successive top-six finishes in Brentford's first three seasons in the First Division and with the club making a record £7,348 profit on the previous season (equivalent to £427,600 in 2025), manager Harry Curtis again elected to not make any significant off-season signings, stating "negotiations took place in an effort to get certain players of great repute, but the deals did not come off. During this close season the position still seems to be the same, the clubs being unwilling to part with players, irrespective of the price offered". Enquiries for Manchester City's Peter Doherty, Blackpool's Danny Blair, Everton's Joe Mercer, Hull City's David Parker and Scots Jimmy Carabine and Andy Black were all rebuffed.

Long-serving Scottish international wing half Duncan McKenzie was sold to Middlesbrough in May 1938 for a £6,000 fee. After youngsters Les Smith and Gerry McAloon were promoted into the first team during the previous two seasons, Curtis would again dip into the reserve and junior ranks and give debuts to left back Doug Anderson and forwards Len Townsend and George Wilkins during the season. Brentford finished pre-season with a 2–1 Football League Jubilee Fund victory over neighbours Chelsea.

Brentford started the First Division season with two wins and a draw – the second victory being played in front of a club record 38,535 home crowd versus London rivals Arsenal. Just one point from the following seven matches dropped the Bees to the bottom of the First Division. Scottish international forward David McCulloch's previous prolific goalscoring form had deserted him and reliable forwards Bobby Reid and Billy Scott also found goalscoring chances hard to come by. Having scored just twice in 9 appearances, McCulloch departed Griffin Park to join Derby County for a £9,500 fee on 22 October 1938. Brentford's form picked up slightly after McCulloch's departure, losing just three of the following 12 matches, but two other regular starters departed in the midst of the run – forward George Eastham to Blackpool for £5,000 and long-serving captain Arthur Bateman was forced to retire. Manager Curtis signed Irish international full back Bill Gorman to partner George Poyser in defence and promoted young forwards Len Townsend and George Wilkins to the first team. In December 1938, he added former Fulham reserve team manager Joe Edelston to the coaching staff.

Brentford's bad form continued through to February 1939 and again the team was hit by the loss of a key players, with Scottish international forward Bobby Reid moving to Sheffield United and Gerry McAloon departing for Wolverhampton Wanderers the following month. Manager Curtis brought in two new forwards, Tommy Cheetham from local rivals Queens Park Rangers and Les Boulter from Charlton Athletic for £5,000 each. Cheetham scored on his second appearance to begin a run of five wins and a draw, which took the Bees up to 13th position and effectively saved the club's top-flight status. Brentford lost seven of the remaining 10 matches and finished in 18th place.

Despite the poor finish, the season ended on a high note, when on 24 May 1939, 21-year-old forward Les Smith became the second Brentford player to win a full England cap, which came in a 2–0 friendly win over Romania in Bucharest.

== League table ==
Pos	Team	Pld	W	D	L	GF	GA	GAv	Pts
16	Sunderland	42	13	12	17	54	67	0.806	38
17	Portsmouth	42	12	13	17	47	70	0.671	37
18	Brentford	42	14	8	20	53	74	0.716	36
19	Huddersfield Town	42	12	11	19	58	64	0.906	35
20	Chelsea	42	12	9	21	64	80	0.800	33

Source: World Football
Rules for classification: 1) Points; 2) Goal average; 3) Goals scored

== Results ==
Brentford's goal tally listed first.

=== Legend ===
Win	Draw	Loss

=== Football League First Division ===
No.	Date	Opponent	Venue	Result	Attendance	Scorer(s)
1	27 August 1938	Huddersfield Town	H	2–1	26,638	Brown, McCulloch
2	3 September 1938	Everton	A	1–2	35,989	Reid
3	8 September 1938	Arsenal	H	1–0	38,535	McAloon
4	10 September 1938	Wolverhampton Wanderers	H	0–1	28,027	
5	17 September 1938	Aston Villa	A	0–5	49,092	
6	19 September 1938	Blackpool	A	1–4	21,970	Scott
7	24 September 1938	Sunderland	H	2–3	26,128	Eastham, McCulloch
8	1 October 1938	Grimsby Town	A	0–0	12,106	
9	8 October 1938	Derby County	H	1–3	23,539	Scott
10	15 October 1938	Stoke City	A	2–3	23,588	Holliday (pen), Hopkins
11	22 October 1938	Chelsea	H	1–0	31,425	Reid
12	29 October 1938	Charlton Athletic	A	1–1	32,191	Scott
13	5 November 1938	Bolton Wanderers	H	2–2	24,594	Atkinson (og), Scott
14	12 November 1938	Leeds United	A	2–3	22,555	Edelston, Brown
15	19 November 1938	Liverpool	H	2–1	20,977	Holliday (2)
16	26 November 1938	Leicester City	A	1–1	16,634	Scott
17	3 December 1938	Middlesbrough	H	2–1	21,746	Holliday, Sneddon
18	10 December 1938	Birmingham	A	1–5	23,333	Holliday
19	17 December 1938	Manchester United	H	2–5	14,919	Gibbons, Vose (og)
20	24 December 1938	Huddersfield Town	A	2–1	11,483	Smith, Townsend
21	27 December 1938	Portsmouth	A	2–2	31,732	Townsend, McAloon
22	31 December 1938	Everton	H	2–0	27,861	Townsend (2)
23	14 January 1939	Wolverhampton Wanderers	A	2–5	23,944	Edelston (2)
24	28 January 1939	Sunderland	A	1–1	19,591	Sneddon (pen)
25	4 February 1939	Grimsby Town	H	1–2	17,380	Scott
26	8 February 1939	Aston Villa	H	2–4	21,162	Edelston, Reid (pen)
27	11 February 1939	Derby County	A	2–1	19,707	Hopkins, Cheetham
28	18 February 1939	Stoke City	H	1–0	26,237	Cheetham
29	22 February 1939	Portsmouth	H	2–0	14,290	McAloon, Scott
30	25 February 1939	Chelsea	A	3–1	33,511	Cheetham (2), Smith
31	4 March 1939	Charlton Athletic	H	1–0	24,440	Hopkins
32	11 March 1939	Bolton Wanderers	A	1–1	15,161	Boulter
33	18 March 1939	Leeds United	H	0–1	21,480	
34	25 March 1939	Liverpool	A	0–1	18,113	
35	1 April 1939	Leicester City	H	2–0	17,238	Smith, Hopkins
36	7 April 1939	Preston North End	H	3–1	30,780	Cheetham (2), Edelston
37	8 April 1939	Middlesbrough	A	1–3	18,191	Cheetham
38	10 April 1939	Preston North End	A	0–2	22,350	
39	15 April 1939	Birmingham	H	0–1	15,298	
40	22 April 1939	Manchester United	A	0–3	15,353	
41	29 April 1939	Blackpool	H	1–1	12,761	Cheetham
42	6 May 1939	Arsenal	A	0–2	30,928	

=== FA Cup ===
Round	Date	Opponent	Venue	Result	Attendance
3R	7 January 1939	Newcastle United	H	0–2	27,551

- Sources: Statto, 11v11, 100 Years of Brentford

== Playing squad ==
Players' ages are as of the opening day of the 1938–39 season.

Pos.	Name	Nat.	Date of birth (age)	Signed from	Signed in	Notes
Goalkeepers
GK	Joe Crozier	(Scotland)	2 December 1914 (aged 23)	East Fife	1937	
Defenders
DF	Doug Anderson	(Scotland)	25 March 1914 (aged 24)	Hibernian	1937	
DF	Bill Gorman	(Republic of Ireland)	13 January 1911 (aged 27)	Bury	1938	
DF	George Poyser	(England)	6 February 1910 (aged 28)	Port Vale	1934	
DF	Joe Wilson	(England)	29 September 1911 (aged 26)	Southend United	1935	
Midfielders						
HB	Vic Aicken	(Ireland)	29 October 1914 (aged 23)	Glentoran	1937	
HB	Sam Briddon	(England)	26 July 1915 (aged 23)	Port Vale	1935	
HB	Buster Brown	(England)	6 September 1910 (aged 27)	Huddersfield Town	1937	
HB	Joe James (c)	(England)	13 January 1910 (aged 28)	Battersea Church	1929	
HB	Tally Sneddon	(Scotland)	1 April 1914 (aged 24)	Falkirk	1937	
Forwards
FW	Les Boulter	(Wales)	31 August 1913 (aged 24)	Charlton Athletic	1939	
FW	Tommy Cheetham	(England)	11 October 1910 (aged 27)	Queens Park Rangers	1939	
FW	Maurice Edelston	(England)	27 April 1918 (aged 20)	Wimbledon	1937	Amateur
FW	Jackie Gibbons	(England)	10 April 1914 (aged 24)	Tottenham Hotspur	1938	Amateur
FW	Jack Holliday	(England)	19 December 1908 (aged 29)	Middlesbrough	1932	
FW	Idris Hopkins	(Wales)	11 October 1910 (aged 27)	Crystal Palace	1932	
FW	Ernest Muttitt	(England)	24 July 1908 (aged 30)	Middlesbrough	1932	
FW	Billy Scott	(England)	6 December 1907 (aged 30)	Middlesbrough	1932	
FW	Les Smith	(England)	13 March 1918 (aged 20)	Petersham	1934	
FW	Len Townsend	(England)	31 August 1917 (aged 20)	Hayes	1937	
FW	George Wilkins	(England)	27 October 1919 (aged 18)	Hayes	1938	
Players who left the club mid-season
DF	Arthur Bateman	(England)	1 April 1909 (aged 29)	Southend United	1934	Retired
FW	George Eastham	(England)	13 August 1914 (aged 24)	Bolton Wanderers	1937	Transferred to Blackpool
FW	Gerry McAloon	(Scotland)	13 September 1916 (aged 21)	St Francis	1934	Transferred to Wolverhampton Wanderers
FW	David McCulloch	(Scotland)	5 October 1912 (aged 25)	Heart of Midlothian	1935	Transferred to Derby County
FW	Bobby Reid	(Scotland)	19 February 1911 (aged 27)	Hamilton Academical	1936	Transferred to Sheffield United

- Sources: 100 Years of Brentford, Timeless Bees, Football League Players' Records 1888 to 1939

== Coaching staff ==
Name	Role
(England) Harry Curtis	Manager
(Scotland) Jimmy Bain	Assistant Manager
(England) Bob Kane	Trainer
(England) Jack Cartmell	Assistant Trainer
(England) Joe Edelston	Assistant Trainer

== Statistics ==
=== Appearances and goals ===

Brentford's highest appearance-makers in each position during the Football League season.

Pos	Nat	Name	League		FA Cup		Total	
Pos	Nat	Name	Apps	Goals	Apps	Goals	Apps	Goals
GK	(Scotland)	Joe Crozier	42	0	1	0	43	0
DF	(Scotland)	Doug Anderson	1	0	0	0	1	0
DF	(England)	Arthur Bateman	7	0	0	0	7	0
DF	(Republic of Ireland)	Bill Gorman	24	0	1	0	25	0
DF	(England)	George Poyser	33	0	1	0	34	0
DF	(England)	Joe Wilson	10	0	0	0	10	0
HB	(Ireland)	Vic Aicken	3	0	0	0	3	0
HB	(England)	Sam Briddon	6	0	1	0	7	0
HB	(England)	Buster Brown	33	2	1	0	34	2
HB	(England)	Joe James	39	0	1	0	40	0
HB	(Scotland)	Tally Sneddon	27	2	0	0	27	2
FW	(Wales)	Les Boulter	16	1	—		16	1
FW	(England)	Tommy Cheetham	17	8	—		17	8
FW	(England)	George Eastham	11	1	—		11	1
FW	(England)	Maurice Edelston	19	5	0	0	19	5
FW	(England)	Jackie Gibbons	11	1	0	0	11	1
FW	(England)	Jack Holliday	10	5	0	0	10	5
FW	(Wales)	Idris Hopkins	32	4	1	0	33	4
FW	(Scotland)	Gerry McAloon	14	3	1	0	15	3
FW	(Scotland)	David McCulloch	9	2	—		9	2
FW	(England)	Ernest Muttitt	13	0	0	0	13	0
FW	(Scotland)	Bobby Reid	17	3	0	0	17	3
FW	(England)	Billy Scott	28	7	1	0	29	7
FW	(England)	Les Smith	33	3	1	0	34	3
FW	(England)	Len Townsend	4	4	1	0	5	4
FW	(England)	George Wilkins	3	0	0	0	3	0

- Players listed in italics left the club mid-season.
- Source: 100 Years of Brentford

=== Goalscorers ===
Pos.	Nat	Player	FL1	FAC	Total
FW	(England)	Tommy Cheetham	8	0	8
FW	(England)	Billy Scott	7	0	7
FW	(England)	Maurice Edelston	5	0	5
FW	(England)	Jack Holliday	5	0	5
FW	(Wales)	Idris Hopkins	4	0	4
FW	(England)	Len Townsend	4	0	4
FW	(Scotland)	Gerry McAloon	3	0	3
FW	(Scotland)	Bobby Reid	3	0	3
FW	(England)	Les Smith	3	0	3
FW	(Scotland)	David McCulloch	2	—	2
HB	(England)	Buster Brown	2	0	2
HB	(Scotland)	Tally Sneddon	2	0	2
FW	(England)	George Eastham	1	—	1
FW	(Wales)	Les Boulter	1	0	1
FW	(England)	Jackie Gibbons	1	0	1
Opponents			2	0	2
Total			53	0	53

- Players listed in italics left the club mid-season.
- Source: 100 Years of Brentford

=== International caps ===
==== Full ====
Pos.	Nat	Player	Caps	Goals	Ref
DF	(Republic of Ireland)	Bill Gorman	1	0	
FW	(Wales)	Les Boulter	1	1	
FW	(Wales)	Idris Hopkins	3	1	
FW	(England)	Les Smith	1	0	

==== Amateur ====
Pos.	Nat	Player	Caps	Goals	Ref
FW	(England)	Maurice Edelston	3	4	
FW	(England)	Jackie Gibbons	3	4	

=== Management ===
Name	Nat	From	To	Record All Comps					Record League				
Name	Nat	From	To	P	W	D	L	W %	P	W	D	L	W %
Harry Curtis	(England)	27 August 1938	6 May 1939	43	14	8	21	32.56|	42	14	8	20	33.33

=== Summary ===
Games played	43 (42 First Division, 1 FA Cup)
Games won	14 (14 First Division, 0 FA Cup)
Games drawn	8 (8 First Division, 0 FA Cup)
Games lost	21 (20 First Division, 1 FA Cup)
Goals scored	53 (53 First Division, 0 FA Cup)
Goals conceded	76 (74 First Division, 2 FA Cup)
Clean sheets	8 (8 First Division, 0 FA Cup)
Biggest league win	2–0 on three occasions; 3–1 versus Preston North End, 7 April 1939
Worst league defeat	5–0 versus Aston Villa, 17 September 1938
Most appearances	43, Joe Crozier (42 First Division, 1 FA Cup)
Top scorer (league)	8, Tommy Cheetham
Top scorer (all competitions)	8, Tommy Cheetham

== Transfers & loans ==
Cricketers are not included in this list.

Players transferred in
Date	Pos.	Name	Previous club	Fee	Ref.
May 1938	HB	(England) William Gibbons	(Wales) Wrexham	n/a	
May 1938	DF	(England) Harry Oliver	(England) Hartlepools United	£1,500	
19 June 1938	FW	(England) Fred Durrant	(England) Folkestone	n/a	
June 1938	DF	(England) Bob Allen	(England) Doncaster Rovers	n/a	
July 1938	HB	(Ireland) Ray Ferris	(Ireland) Glentoran	Amateur	
July 1938	FW	(England) Fred Rowell	(England) Sunderland	n/a	
16 August 1938	FW	(England) Jackie Gibbons	(England) Tottenham Hotspur	Amateur	
December 1938	DF	(Republic of Ireland) Bill Gorman	(England) Bury	£7,000	
1938	GK	James Bayne	n/a	n/a	
1938	HB	(England) John Moore	Unattached	Free	
1938	DF	(England) Robert Smith	Unattached	n/a	
January 1939	FW	(England) Cyril Brown	(England) Felixstowe	n/a	
7 February 1939	FW	(Wales) Les Boulter	(England) Charlton Athletic	£5,000	
7 February 1939	FW	(England) Tommy Cheetham	(England) Queens Park Rangers	£5,000	
April 1939	DF	(England) Fred Mansfield	(England) Cambridge Town	n/a	
n/a	FW	(Scotland) Albert Degnan	(England) Charlton Athletic	n/a	
n/a	FW	(England) Ron Griffin	(England) Lincoln City	n/a	
n/a	FW	(Scotland) Johnny Kay	n/a	n/a	
n/a	n/a	Archie Waddell	n/a	n/a	
Players transferred out
Date	Pos.	Name	Subsequent club	Join date	Ref.
May 1938	HB	(Scotland) Duncan McKenzie	(England) Middlesbrough	£6,000	
21 October 1938	FW	(Scotland) David McCulloch	(England) Derby County	£9,500	
November 1938	FW	(England) George Eastham	(England) Blackpool	£5,000	
February 1939	FW	(Scotland) Bobby Reid	(England) Sheffield United	£6,000	
16 March 1939	FW	(Scotland) Gerry McAloon	(England) Wolverhampton Wanderers	£5,000	
Players released
Date	Pos.	Name	Subsequent club	Join date	Ref.
May 1939	DF	(England) Bob Allen	(England) Dartford	June 1939	
May 1939	DF	(England) Arthur Bateman	Retired		
May 1939	FW	(Scotland) Albert Degnan	(Scotland) Albion Rovers	15 June 1939	
May 1939	FW	(England) Maurice Edelston	(England) Corinthian	May 1939	
May 1939	HB	(Ireland) Ray Ferris	(England) Cambridge Town	1939	
May 1939	FW	(England) Jackie Gibbons	(England) Tottenham Hotspur	1939	
May 1939	FW	(England) Ron Griffin	(England) Watford	August 1939	
