= 1936–37 Dumbarton F.C. season =

Dumbarton
1936–1937 season
- Stadium: Boghead Park, Dumbarton
- Scottish League Division Two: 15th
- Scottish Cup: Second Round
- Top goalscorer: League: Stephen Murray (11); All: Stephen Murray (14)
Home colours

The 1936–37 season was the 60th Scottish football season in which Dumbarton competed at national level, entering the Scottish Football League and the Scottish Cup. In addition Dumbarton competed in the Dumbartonshire Cup.

== Scottish League ==
After the previous season's disastrous performance, Dumbarton began their 15th successive season in the Second Division with a complete clear out of playing staff. Amongst other initiatives, Dumbarton entered into an arrangement with Clyde whereby their 'second string' players would be made available for development. Initially there was a big improvement, with 6 wins and 2 draws being gained from the first 10 league games, but with the next 11 games yielding just a single point, the earlier confidence disappeared and eventually Dumbarton finished 15th out of 18, with 27 points - half of the points won by champions Ayr United.

8 August 1936 League	Dumbarton	2–0	Edinburgh City	Boghead Park
	McFarlane 18'; Rae 51'			Attendance: 2,700; Referee: J Welsh

15 August 1936 League	Leith Athletic	2–1	Dumbarton	Old Meadowbank
	Duncan 14'; McPeat 57' (pen.)		Rae 76'	Attendance: 3,000; Referee: W Murray

22 August 1936 League	Dumbarton	3–1	Montrose	Boghead Park
	Rae 43', 60'; McDonnell 46'		Jamieson 84'	Attendance: 2,800; Referee: J Johnstone

29 August 1936 League	Stenhousemuir	4–1	Dumbarton	Ochilview Park
	Howie 30', 35', 49', 60'		Sinclair 40' (pen.)	Referee: J Taylor

5 September 1936 League	Dumbarton	3–2	Cowdenbeath	Boghead Park
	Rae 12', 22'; Mowatt 80'		Gillies 38'; Malloy 82'	Attendance: 2,400; Referee: J MacKay

12 September 1936 League	Dundee United	1–1	Dumbarton	Tannadice Park
	Ross 26'		Murray 51'	Attendance: 2,500; Referee: A Williamson

19 September 1936 League	Dumbarton	1–1	Forfar Athletic	Boghead Park
	Parlane, W 28'		Black, W 51'	Attendance: 2,500; Referee: R Innes

26 September 1936 League	East Fife	1–2	Dumbarton	Bayview Park, Methil
	Scott 77'		Mowatt 40'; Cuthbert 88'	Attendance: 4,000; Referee: H McWilliam

3 October 1936 League	Dumbarton	2–1	East Stirling	Boghead Park
	Duffy 41'; McDonnell 75'		Bulloch 44' (pen.)	Attendance: 2,500; Referee: A Williamson

10 October 1936 League	Dumbarton	2–1	Brechin City	Boghead Park
	Rae 44'; Duffy 83'		Kay 20'	Attendance: 2,500; Referee: W Murray

17 October 1936 League	Raith Rovers	3–0	Dumbarton	Starks Park
	Fulton 7'; Fraser 20'; Gilmour 29'			Attendance: 2,500; Referee: A Fair

24 October 1936 League	Dumbarton	0–4	Morton	Boghead Park
			Collins 13'; Ferguson 48', 84'; Calder 53'	Attendance: 2,500; Referee: J MacKay

31 October 1936 League	Alloa Athletic	2–0	Dumbarton	Recreation Park, Alloa
	Wilson 20'; Irvine 30' (pen.)			Attendance: 2,000; Referee: D McKerracher

7 November 1936 League	Dumbarton	1–3	Ayr United	Boghead Park
	Mowatt 18'		Gemmell 3'; Dimmer 10'; Torbet 26'	Attendance: 2,800; Referee: M Dale

14 November 1936 League	Dumbarton	1–4	St Bernard's	Boghead Park
	Mowatt 40'		Grant 59'; Hogg 62'; Flucker 83'; Pinkerton 87'	Attendance: 2,000; Referee: J Welsh

21 November 1936 League	King's Park	1–1	Dumbarton	Forthbank Park
	Cassidy 28'		Glass 15'	Attendance: 2,000; Referee: J Taylor

28 November 1936 League	Dumbarton	4–5	Dundee United	Boghead Park
	McFarlane 37'; Robertson 41'; Glass 60'; Mowatt 83'		Paterson 4', 10'; Reid 35'; Milne 43'; Skelligan 48' (pen.)	Attendance: 2,000; Referee: R Carruthers

12 December 1936 League	Ayr United	4–1	Dumbarton	Somerset Park
	McGibben 31', 57'; Smith,A 54'; Dimmer 71'		Murray 15'	Attendance: 5,000; Referee: M Dale

19 December 1936 League	Dumbarton	2–3	Airdrie	Boghead Park
	Rae 37'; McDonnell 63'		Moffat 47'; Angus 73'; Wylie 74'	Referee: W Gilchrist

26 December 1936 League	St Bernard's	4–0	Dumbarton	Royal Gymnasium Ground
	Grant 15', 46'; Hogg 27', 73'			Attendance: 1,500; Referee: A Williamson

1 January 1937 League	Cowdenbeath	1–0	Dumbarton	Central Park, Cowdenbeath
	Malloy 85'			Referee: J Yeaman

2 January 1937 League	Dumbarton	2–1	East Fife	Boghead Park
	Robertson 54'; McDonnell 70'		Downie 28'	Attendance: 1,500; Referee: R Carruthers

9 January 1937 League	East Stirling	4–1	Dumbarton	Firs Park
	Brown 15'; Cochrane 26'; Staddart 65'; Meechan 86'		Rae 77'	Attendance: 500; Referee: W Gilchrist

16 January 1937 League	Brechin City	3–2	Dumbarton	Glebe Park, Brechin
	Quigley 4'; Brand 35'; Denis 72'		Robertson 37'; Boyd 54'	Attendance: 500; Referee: J Lawrie

23 January 1937 League	Dumbarton	6–3	King's Park	Boghead Park
	Trialist 6' (OG); McDonnell 15'; Murray 20', 49'; Robertson 42'; Clark,J 87' (OG)		Clark,W 58'; McDowall 65'; Miller 83'	Attendance: 1,500; Referee: A Fair

6 February 1937 League	Montrose	2–1	Dumbarton	Links Park
	Jamieson 20'; Herbert 70'		Mowatt 60'	Attendance: 1,000; Referee: A Williamson

20 February 1937 League	Edinburgh City	2–5	Dumbarton	East Pilton, Edinburgh
	Carruthers 10'		McDonnell; Murray 47'; Glass; McMahon	Attendance: 1,000; Referee: W Gilchrist

27 February 1937 League	Dumbarton	3–4	Stenhousemuir	Boghead Park
	Murray 37'; Robertson 42'; Glass 60' (pen.)		Murray, R 20', 67'; McNair 34'; Howie 67'	Attendance: 1,500; Referee: W Gilchrist

6 March 1937 League	Dumbarton	1–1	Leith Athletic	Boghead Park
	Glass 55' (pen.)		Haddow 50'	Attendance: 1,000; Referee: J Johnstone

20 March 1937 League	Dumbarton	3–1	Raith Rovers	Boghead Park
	Murray 70', 88'; Duffy 89' (pen.)		Gilmour 32'	Attendance: 1,200; Referee: A Williamson

27 February 1937 League	Airdrie	5–0	Dumbarton	Broomfield Park
	Hill 32'; Murray 60'; Hogg 63', 71'; Anderson 69'			Referee: R Innes

3 April 1937 League	Forfar Athletic	3–4	Dumbarton	Station Park, Forfar
	McLean 21', 29'; Black, W 74'		Robertson 26'; Murray 65', 77' (pen.); Laird 75' (OG)	Referee: R Carruthers

10 April 1937 League	Dumbarton	1–1	Alloa Athletic	Boghead Park
	McMahon		Goal	Attendance: 1,200; Referee: W Gilchrist

21 April 1937 League	Morton	5–0	Dumbarton	Cappielow Park
	Black 5', 8'			Attendance: 5,000

== Scottish Cup ==
In the Scottish Cup, there was more disappointment. The first round tie against Highland League opponents, Keith was won, but only just. However Dumbarton were not to be so lucky in the second round and were dumped out of the competition by non-league minnows Duns.

30 January 1937 Cup R1	Dumbarton	3–1	Keith	Boghead Park
	Murray 5', 12'; McMahon 86'		Newman 49'	Attendance: 1,348

13 February 1937 Cup R2	Duns	2–1	Dumbarton	Hawthorn Park, Duns
	Scott 44'; Bradley 89'		Murray 55'	Attendance: 2,400; Referee: W McCulloch

== Dumbartonshire Cup ==
The only bright spot of another poor season was when Dumbarton retained the Dumbartonshire Cup with victory over amateur side Vale Ocaba.

23 April 1937 Final	Dumbarton	2–0	Vale Ocaba	Boghead Park
	Murray

== Player statistics ==
No.	Pos	Nat	Player	Total		Second Division		Scottish Cup	
No.	Pos	Nat	Player	Apps	Goals	Apps	Goals	Apps	Goals
	GK	(Scotland) SCO	Joseph Jackson	7	0	7	0	0	0
	GK	(Scotland) SCO	Lang	2	0	2	0	0	0
	GK	(Scotland) SCO	Alex Scott	26	0	24	0	2	0
	DF	(Scotland) SCO	John Casey	36	0	34	0	2	0
	DF	(Scotland) SCO	David Ogilvie	17	0	17	0	0	0
	MF	(Scotland) SCO	Archibald Duffy	14	3	14	3	0	0
	MF	(Scotland) SCO	Andrew Sinclair	29	1	27	1	2	0
	MF	(Scotland) SCO	John Glass	29	5	27	5	2	0
	MF	(Scotland) SCO	Stephen Murray	34	14	32	11	2	3
	MF	(Scotland) SCO	Alex Young	32	0	30	0	2	0
	FW	(Scotland) SCO	James Black	1	0	1	0	0	0
	FW	(Scotland) SCO	Boyd	1	1	1	1	0	0
	FW	(Scotland) SCO	John Cuthbert	13	1	13	1	0	0
	FW	(Scotland) SCO	John Martin	1	0	1	0	0	0
	FW	(Scotland) SCO	Edward McDonnell	28	6	26	6	2	0
	FW	(Scotland) SCO	Hugh MacFarlane	31	2	29	2	2	0
	FW	(Scotland) SCO	Andrew McGillvray	4	0	4	0	0	0
	FW	(Scotland) SCO	Peter McMahon	12	3	10	2	2	1
	FW	(Scotland) SCO	James Mitchell	4	0	4	0	0	0
	FW	(Scotland) SCO	Magnus Mowatt	33	6	31	6	2	0
	FW	(Scotland) SCO	Willie Parlane	3	1	3	1	0	0
	FW	(Scotland) SCO	John Rae	15	9	15	9	0	0
	FW	(Scotland) SCO	Abram Robertson	19	6	17	6	2	0
	FW	(Scotland) SCO	Martin Watson	1	0	1	0	0	0
	FW	(Scotland) SCO	Trialist	4	0	4	0	0	0

=== Transfers ===
==== Players in ====
Player	From	Date
(Scotland) Stephen Murray	(Scotland) Stenhousemuir	2 Jun 1936
(Scotland) John Cuthbert	(Scotland) Clyde (loan)	6 Aug 1936
(Scotland) Hugh MacFarlane	(Scotland) Clyde (loan)	6 Aug 1936
(Scotland) Magnus Mowatt	(Scotland) Clyde (loan)	6 Aug 1936
(Scotland) John Rae	(Scotland) Clyde (loan)	6 Aug 1936
(Scotland) Edward McDonnell	(Scotland) St Anthony's	15 Jun 1936
(Scotland) John Glass	(Scotland) Rosewell Rosedale	19 Jun 1936
(Scotland) Alex Scott	(Scotland) Cowdenbeath	25 Jun 1936
(Scotland) Andrew Sinclair	(Scotland) Motherwell	1 Jul 1936
(Scotland) Archibald Duffy	(Scotland) Morton	5 Aug 1936
(Scotland) Andrew McGillivray	(Scotland) Dundee United	6 Nov 1936
(Scotland) James Black	(Scotland) Kilmarnock	19 Nov 1936
(Scotland) James Mitchell	(Scotland) King's Park	19 Nov 1936
(Scotland) Abram Robertson	(Scotland) Morton	26 Nov 1936
(Scotland) David Ogilvie	(Scotland) Amateur	7 Dec 1936
(Scotland) Peter McMahon	(Scotland) East Fife	5 Jan 1937
(Scotland) Joseph Jackson	(Scotland) Vale Ocaba	1 Apr 1937

==== Players out ====
Player	To	Date
(Scotland) Robert Speedie	(Scotland) King's Park	18 Jul 1936
(Scotland) Andrew McGillivray	(Scotland) Released	1 Dec 1936
(Scotland) James Black	(Scotland) Released	19 Dec 1936
(Scotland) John Crawford	(Scotland) Stenhousemuir	
(Scotland) Harry Cook	(Scotland) Juniors	
(Scotland) Issac McDowall	(Scotland) King's Park	
(Scotland) John McIntyre	(Scotland) Galston	
(Scotland) Robert Tait	(Scotland) East Fife	
(Scotland) George Taylor	(Scotland) Albion Rovers	

In addition Ronald Cameron, A Clark, William Clark, Robert Hogg, Robert Kerr, Archibald Taylor and Archibald Turner all played their last games in Dumbarton 'colours'.
