= 1937–38 Brentford F.C. season =

English football team season

Brentford
1937–38 season
- Chairman: Louis P. Simon
- Manager: Harry Curtis
- Stadium: Griffin Park
- First Division: 6th
- FA Cup: Sixth round
- Empire Exhibition Trophy: Quarter-final
- Top goalscorer: League: McCulloch (26); All: McCulloch (29)
- Highest home attendance: 37,586
- Lowest home attendance: 14,609
- Average home league attendance: 23,335
Home colours

During the 1937–38 English football season, Brentford competed in the Football League First Division. In the league, the Bees matched the previous season's finish of 6th and advanced to the 6th round of the FA Cup for the first time in club history. In 2013, the Brentford supporters voted 1937–38 as the club's second-best season.

== Season summary ==
As in the past two off-seasons, Brentford manager Harry Curtis elected to bring in youngsters to supplement his squad, with left half Tally Sneddon and forwards George Eastham and Maurice Edelston being the only new outfield summer signings that would appear during the season. Joe Crozier was signed to back up goalkeeper Jim Mathieson.

Despite an opening-day defeat to Bolton Wanderers (which left Brentford bottom of the First Division), the team rallied in mid-September 1937. With forward David McCulloch in outstanding goalscoring form, the Bees went on a six-match undefeated run, which took them from 13th to the top of the table on 16 October. With Bobby Reid and Billy Scott also supplementing McCulloch's goals up front, Brentford remained unmoved from the top of the table between 30 September 1937 and 19 February 1938. During the run, Brentford advanced to the sixth round of the FA Cup for the first time in club history and exited after a 3–0 defeat to Preston North End, which was played in front of a then-club record crowd of 37,586 at Griffin Park.

Brentford won just four of the final 16 matches of the season and finished in 6th place, which matched the previous season's position. The Bees took part in the one-off Empire Exhibition Trophy after the season, replacing Arsenal (who had dropped out of the competition), but the team fell at the first hurdle, with a 1–0 defeat to Heart of Midlothian at Ibrox. In 2013, the Brentford supporters voted 1937–38 as the club's second-best season.

== League table ==
| Pos | Team | Pld | W | D | L | GF | GA | GAv | Pts |
|---|---|---|---|---|---|---|---|---|---|
| 4 | Charlton Athletic | 42 | 16 | 14 | 12 | 65 | 51 | 1.275 | 46 |
| 5 | Middlesbrough | 42 | 19 | 8 | 15 | 72 | 65 | 1.108 | 46 |
| 6 | Brentford | 42 | 18 | 9 | 15 | 69 | 59 | 1.169 | 45 |
| 7 | Bolton Wanderers | 42 | 15 | 15 | 12 | 64 | 60 | 1.067 | 45 |
| 8 | Sunderland | 42 | 14 | 16 | 12 | 55 | 57 | 0.965 | 44 |

Source: World Football
Rules for classification: 1) Points; 2) Goal average; 3) Goals scored

== Results ==
Brentford's goal tally listed first.

=== Legend ===
| Win | Draw | Loss |

=== Football League First Division ===
| No. | Date | Opponent | Venue | Result | Attendance | Scorer(s) |
|---|---|---|---|---|---|---|
| 1 | 28 August 1937 | Bolton Wanderers | A | 0–2 | 31,572 | |
| 2 | 1 September 1937 | Preston North End | H | 2–1 | 21,228 | W. Scott, Reid |
| 3 | 4 September 1937 | Huddersfield Town | H | 2–0 | 26,762 | McCulloch, McKenzie |
| 4 | 6 September 1937 | Preston North End | A | 1–1 | 21,746 | McCulloch |
| 5 | 11 September 1937 | Everton | A | 0–3 | 36,038 | |
| 6 | 16 September 1937 | Blackpool | H | 2–4 | 14,816 | W. Scott, McCulloch |
| 7 | 18 September 1937 | Wolverhampton Wanderers | H | 2–1 | 28,945 | McCulloch (2) |
| 8 | 20 September 1937 | Blackpool | A | 1–1 | 20,732 | McCulloch |
| 9 | 25 September 1937 | Leicester City | A | 1–0 | 23,416 | McCulloch |
| 10 | 2 October 1937 | Sunderland | H | 4–0 | 35,584 | W. Scott, McCulloch (2), Reid |
| 11 | 9 October 1937 | Derby County | A | 3–1 | 19,621 | McCulloch, Reid (2) |
| 12 | 16 October 1937 | Charlton Athletic | H | 5–2 | 34,861 | McCulloch (4), Reid |
| 13 | 23 October 1937 | Chelsea | A | 1–2 | 56,810 | Smith |
| 14 | 30 October 1937 | Portsmouth | H | 2–0 | 24,138 | Holliday, W. Scott |
| 15 | 6 November 1937 | Liverpool | A | 4–3 | 30,492 | Reid (3), McCulloch |
| 16 | 13 November 1937 | Middlesbrough | H | 3–3 | 25,682 | W. Scott (2), Reid |
| 17 | 20 November 1937 | Grimsby Town | A | 1–0 | 13,206 | McCulloch |
| 18 | 27 November 1937 | West Bromwich Albion | H | 0–2 | 16,702 | |
| 19 | 4 December 1937 | Stoke City | A | 0–3 | 11,970 | |
| 20 | 11 December 1937 | Leeds United | H | 1–1 | 18,184 | McCulloch |
| 21 | 18 December 1937 | Birmingham | A | 0–0 | 22,531 | |
| 22 | 25 December 1937 | Manchester City | A | 2–0 | 37,478 | McKenzie (pen), Reid |
| 23 | 27 December 1937 | Manchester City | H | 2–1 | 33,887 | W. Scott, Reid |
| 24 | 1 January 1938 | Bolton Wanderers | H | 1–1 | 23,210 | Reid |
| 25 | 15 January 1938 | Huddersfield Town | A | 3–0 | 11,969 | Reid, Holliday, McCulloch |
| 26 | 26 January 1938 | Everton | H | 3–0 | 16,917 | McCulloch, W. Scott, Hopkins |
| 27 | 29 January 1938 | Wolverhampton Wanderers | A | 1–2 | 35,989 | McCulloch |
| 28 | 5 February 1938 | Leicester City | H | 1–1 | 21,309 | McCulloch |
| 29 | 16 February 1938 | Sunderland | A | 0–1 | 18,970 | |
| 30 | 19 February 1938 | Derby County | H | 2–3 | 20,561 | McKenzie (2 pens) |
| 31 | 26 February 1938 | Charlton Athletic | A | 0–1 | 35,572 | |
| 32 | 9 March 1938 | Chelsea | H | 1–1 | 20,401 | Hopkins |
| 33 | 12 March 1938 | Portsmouth | A | 1–4 | 23,366 | Reid |
| 34 | 19 March 1938 | Liverpool | H | 1–3 | 17,754 | Hopkins |
| 35 | 26 March 1938 | Middlesbrough | A | 1–0 | 29,339 | Hopkins |
| 36 | 2 April 1938 | Grimsby Town | H | 6–1 | 17,994 | Edelston, McCulloch (2), Reid (2), McAloon |
| 37 | 9 April 1938 | West Bromwich Albion | A | 3–4 | 23,602 | McCulloch (2), McAloon |
| 38 | 15 April 1938 | Arsenal | A | 2–0 | 51,299 | McAloon, Hopkins |
| 39 | 16 April 1938 | Stoke City | H | 0–0 | 21,885 | |
| 40 | 18 April 1938 | Arsenal | H | 3–0 | 34,601 | McCulloch, McAloon, Reid |
| 41 | 23 April 1938 | Leeds United | A | 0–4 | 17,840 | |
| 42 | 30 April 1938 | Birmingham | H | 1–2 | 14,609 | McAloon |

=== FA Cup ===
| Round | Date | Opponent | Venue | Result | Attendance | Scorer(s) |
|---|---|---|---|---|---|---|
| 3R | 8 January 1938 | Fulham | H | 3–1 | 29,867 | Hindson (og), McCulloch (2) |
| 4R | 22 January 1938 | Portsmouth | H | 2–1 | 36,718 | Wilson, McCulloch |
| 5R | 12 February 1938 | Manchester United | H | 2–0 | 27,147 | Holliday, Reid |
| 6R | 5 March 1938 | Preston North End | H | 0–3 | 37,586 | |

=== Empire Exhibition Trophy ===
| Round | Date | Opponent | Venue | Result | Attendance | Notes |
|---|---|---|---|---|---|---|
| QF | 1 June 1938 | Heart of Midlothian | N | 0–1 | 46,000 | (Note: Match played at Ibrox Stadium, Glasgow.) |

- Sources: Statto, 11v11, 100 Years of Brentford, A-Z Of Bees, London Hearts

== Playing squad ==
Players' ages are as of the opening day of the 1937–38 season.

| Pos. | Name | Nat. | Date of birth (age) | Signed from | Signed in | Notes |
| Goalkeepers | | | | | | |
|---|---|---|---|---|---|---|
| GK | Joe Crozier | (Scotland) | 2 December 1914 (aged 22) | East Fife | 1937 | |
| GK | James Mathieson | (Scotland) | 10 May 1904 (aged 33) | Middlesbrough | 1934 | |
| Defenders | | | | | | |
| DF | Arthur Bateman | (England) | 1 April 1909 (aged 28) | Southend United | 1934 | |
| DF | Buster Brown | (England) | 6 September 1910 (aged 26) | Huddersfield Town | 1937 | |
| DF | George Poyser | (England) | 6 February 1910 (aged 27) | Port Vale | 1934 | |
| DF | Joe Wilson | (England) | 29 September 1911 (aged 25) | Southend United | 1935 | |
| Midfielders | | | | | | |
| HB | Joe James (c) | (England) | 13 January 1910 (aged 27) | Battersea Church | 1929 | |
| HB | Duncan McKenzie | (Scotland) | 10 August 1912 (aged 25) | Albion Rovers | 1932 | |
| HB | Archie Scott | (Scotland) | 22 July 1905 (aged 31) | Derby County | 1934 | |
| HB | Tally Sneddon | (Scotland) | 1 April 1914 (aged 23) | Falkirk | 1937 | |
| Forwards | | | | | | |
| FW | George Eastham | (England) | 13 August 1914 (aged 23) | Bolton Wanderers | 1937 | |
| FW | Maurice Edelston | (England) | 27 April 1918 (aged 19) | Wimbledon | 1937 | Amateur |
| FW | Jack Holliday | (England) | 19 December 1908 (aged 28) | Middlesbrough | 1932 | |
| FW | Idris Hopkins | (Wales) | 11 October 1910 (aged 26) | Crystal Palace | 1932 | |
| FW | Gerry McAloon | (Scotland) | 13 September 1916 (aged 20) | St Francis | 1934 | |
| FW | David McCulloch | (Scotland) | 5 October 1912 (aged 24) | Heart of Midlothian | 1935 | |
| FW | Bobby Reid | (Scotland) | 19 February 1911 (aged 26) | Hamilton Academical | 1936 | |
| FW | Billy Scott | (England) | 6 December 1907 (aged 29) | Middlesbrough | 1932 | |
| FW | Les Smith | (England) | 13 March 1918 (aged 19) | Petersham | 1934 | |

- Sources: 100 Years of Brentford, Timeless Bees, Football League Players' Records 1888 to 1939

== Coaching staff ==
| Name | Role |
|---|---|
| (England) Harry Curtis | Manager |
| (Scotland) Jimmy Bain | Assistant Manager |
| (England) Bob Kane | Trainer |
| (England) Jack Cartmell | Assistant Trainer |
| (England) Fred Keatch | Secretary |

== Statistics ==
=== Appearances and goals ===

Brentford's highest appearance-makers in each position during the Football League season.

| Pos | Nat | Name | League | | FA Cup | | Empire Exh. Trophy | | Total | |
| Pos | Nat | Name | Apps | Goals | Apps | Goals | Apps | Goals | Apps | Goals |
|---|---|---|---|---|---|---|---|---|---|---|
| GK | (Scotland) | Joe Crozier | 35 | 0 | 4 | 0 | 1 | 0 | 40 | 0 |
| GK | (Scotland) | James Mathieson | 7 | 0 | 0 | 0 | 0 | 0 | 7 | 0 |
| DF | (England) | Arthur Bateman | 31 | 0 | 4 | 0 | 1 | 0 | 36 | 0 |
| DF | (England) | Buster Brown | 41 | 0 | 4 | 0 | 1 | 0 | 46 | 0 |
| DF | (England) | George Poyser | 16 | 0 | 0 | 0 | 1 | 0 | 17 | 0 |
| DF | (England) | Joe Wilson | 15 | 0 | 2 | 1 | 0 | 0 | 17 | 1 |
| HB | (England) | Joe James | 35 | 0 | 4 | 0 | 1 | 0 | 40 | 0 |
| HB | (Scotland) | Duncan McKenzie | 31 | 4 | 2 | 0 | 0 | 0 | 33 | 4 |
| HB | (Scotland) | Archie Scott | 1 | 0 | 0 | 0 | 0 | 0 | 1 | 0 |
| HB | (Scotland) | Tally Sneddon | 39 | 0 | 4 | 0 | 1 | 0 | 44 | 0 |
| FW | (England) | George Eastham | 38 | 0 | 1 | 0 | 1 | 0 | 40 | 0 |
| FW | (England) | Maurice Edelston | 2 | 1 | 0 | 0 | 0 | 0 | 2 | 1 |
| FW | (England) | Jack Holliday | 8 | 2 | 4 | 1 | 0 | 0 | 12 | 3 |
| FW | (Wales) | Idris Hopkins | 31 | 5 | 3 | 0 | 1 | 0 | 35 | 5 |
| FW | (Scotland) | Gerry McAloon | 7 | 5 | 0 | 0 | 1 | 0 | 8 | 5 |
| FW | (Scotland) | David McCulloch | 41 | 26 | 3 | 3 | 1 | 0 | 45 | 29 |
| FW | (Scotland) | Bobby Reid | 40 | 17 | 4 | 1 | 1 | 0 | 45 | 18 |
| FW | (England) | Billy Scott | 29 | 8 | 4 | 0 | 0 | 0 | 33 | 8 |
| FW | (England) | Les Smith | 15 | 1 | 1 | 0 | 0 | 0 | 16 | 1 |

- Players listed in italics left the club mid-season.
- Source: 100 Years of Brentford

=== Goalscorers ===
| Pos. | Nat | Player | FL1 | FAC | EET | Total |
|---|---|---|---|---|---|---|
| FW | (Scotland) | David McCulloch | 26 | 3 | 0 | 29 |
| FW | (Scotland) | Bobby Reid | 17 | 1 | 0 | 18 |
| FW | (England) | Billy Scott | 8 | 0 | 0 | 8 |
| FW | (Wales) | Idris Hopkins | 5 | 0 | 0 | 5 |
| FW | (Scotland) | Gerry McAloon | 5 | 0 | 0 | 5 |
| HB | (Scotland) | Duncan McKenzie | 4 | 0 | 0 | 4 |
| FW | (England) | Jack Holliday | 2 | 1 | 0 | 3 |
| FW | (England) | Maurice Edelston | 1 | 0 | 0 | 1 |
| FW | (England) | Les Smith | 1 | 0 | 0 | 1 |
| FW | (England) | Joe Wilson | 0 | 1 | 0 | 1 |
| Opponents | | | 0 | 1 | 0 | 1 |
| Total | | | 69 | 7 | 0 | 76 |

- Players listed in italics left the club mid-season.
- Source: 100 Years of Brentford

=== International caps ===
==== Full ====
| Pos. | Nat | Player | Caps | Goals | Ref |
|---|---|---|---|---|---|
| HB | (Scotland) | Duncan McKenzie | 1 | 0 | |
| FW | (Wales) | Idris Hopkins | 2 | 0 | |
| FW | (Scotland) | David McCulloch | 1 | 2 | |
| FW | (Scotland) | Bobby Reid | 2 | 0 | |

==== Amateur ====
| Pos. | Nat | Player | Caps | Goals | Ref |
|---|---|---|---|---|---|
| FW | (England) | Maurice Edelston | 1 | 1 | |

=== Management ===
| Name | Nat | From | To | Record All Comps | | | | | Record League | | | | |
| Name | Nat | From | To | P | W | D | L | W % | P | W | D | L | W % |
|---|---|---|---|---|---|---|---|---|---|---|---|---|---|
| Harry Curtis | (England) | 28 August 1937 | 30 April 1938 | 47 | 21 | 9 | 17 | 44.68| | 42 | 18 | 9 | 15 | 42.86 |

=== Summary ===
| Games played | 47 (42 First Division, 4 FA Cup, 1 Empire Exhibition Trophy) |
| Games won | 21 (18 First Division, 3 FA Cup, 0 Empire Exhibition Trophy) |
| Games drawn | 9 (9 First Division, 0 FA Cup, 0 Empire Exhibition Trophy) |
| Games lost | 17 (15 First Division, 1 FA Cup, 1 Empire Exhibition Trophy) |
| Goals scored | 76 (69 First Division, 7 FA Cup, 0 Empire Exhibition Trophy) |
| Goals conceded | 65 (59 First Division, 5 FA Cup, 1 Empire Exhibition Trophy) |
| Clean sheets | 14 (13 First Division, 1 FA Cup, 0 Empire Exhibition Trophy) |
| Biggest league win | 6–1 versus Grimsby Town, 2 April 1938 |
| Worst league defeat | 4–0 versus Leeds United, 23 April 1938 |
| Most appearances | 46, Buster Brown (41 First Division, 4 FA Cup, 1 Empire Exhibition Trophy) |
| Top scorer (league) | 26, David McCulloch |
| Top scorer (all competitions) | 29, David McCulloch |

== Transfers & loans ==
Cricketers are not included in this list.

Players transferred in
| Date | Pos. | Name | Previous club | Fee | Ref. |
|---|---|---|---|---|---|
| 11 May 1937 | GK | (Scotland) Joe Crozier | (Scotland) East Fife | £1,000 | |
| May 1937 | FW | (England) George Eastham | (England) Bolton Wanderers | £4,000 | |
| May 1937 | FW | (England) Len Townsend | (England) Hayes | n/a | |
| 25 June 1937 | HB | (Scotland) Tally Sneddon | (Scotland) Falkirk | £4,000 | |
| 30 October 1937 | GK | (England) Ted Gaskell | (England) Buxton | £500 | |
| December 1937 | FW | (England) Maurice Edelston | (England) Wimbledon | Amateur | |
| 1937 | HB | (Ireland) Vic Aicken | (Ireland) Glentoran | £1,000 | |
| 1937 | DF | (Scotland) Doug Anderson | (Scotland) Hibernian | n/a | |
| 1937 | FW | (Scotland) Magnus Mowatt | (Scotland) Clyde | n/a | |
| 1937 | HB | (England) Les Sinton | n/a | n/a | |
| February 1938 | FW | (England) George Wilkins | (England) Hayes | n/a | |
Players released
| Date | Pos. | Name | Subsequent club | Join date | Ref. |
| May 1938 | DF | (England) George Dumbrell | Retired | | |
| May 1938 | GK | (Scotland) James Mathieson | (Scotland) Queen of the South | 1 June 1938 | |
| May 1938 | FW | (Scotland) Magnus Mowatt | (England) Lincoln City | 1938 | |
| May 1938 | HB | (Scotland) Joe Murray | (Scotland) Partick Thistle | 2 June 1938 | |
| May 1938 | HB | (Scotland) Archie Scott | Retired | | |
| May 1938 | HB | (England) Les Sinton | (England) Gateshead | n/a | |
