= Jack Atkinson =

Jack Atkinson may refer to:

- Jack Atkinson (English footballer) (1913–1977)
- Jack Atkinson (Australian footballer) (born 1928), Australian rules footballer
