= John Rae =

John Rae may refer to:

== Sportsmen ==
- Johnny Rae (rugby league), rugby league footballer of the 1960s for Great Britain and Bradford Northern
- John Rae (New Zealand footballer), New Zealand international football (soccer) player
- John Rae (footballer, born 1862) (1862–1917), Scottish footballer for Third Lanark, Sunderland, Scotland
- John Rae (footballer, born 1912) (1912–2007), Scottish footballer for Dumbarton, East Stirlingshire, Bristol Rovers

== Musicians ==
- Johnny Rae (1934-1993), American jazz drummer
- John Rae (musician) (born 1966), Scottish jazz drummer
- Jackie Rae (1922–2006), Canadian singer-songwriter

== Others ==
- John Rae (actor) (1896–1985), Scottish actor
- John Rae (economist) (1796–1872), Scottish economist and author of Statement of Some New Principles on the Subject of Political Economy
- John Rae (explorer) (1813–1893), Scottish explorer of the Arctic
- John Rae (administrator) (1813–1900), Australian administrator, painter and author
- John Rae (biographer) (1845–1915), Scottish journalist and biographer of Adam Smith
- John Rae (politician) (1904–1979), politician of the New Zealand National Party
- John Rae (headmaster) (1931–2006), English novelist, journalist and headmaster
- John A. Rae (born 1945), Canadian businessman, political organizer, and political adviser
- John B. Rae (1838–1922), American labour leader in 1890s
- John Simpson Rae (artist) (1882–1963), American illustrator, children's book author, and portraitist; author of the 1917 New Adventures of Alice
- John Rae (minister), 17th century Scottish minister who died, in prison, on the Bass Rock

== See also ==
- John Ray (disambiguation)
- Johnny Ray (disambiguation)
- John Wray (disambiguation)
