= Gerry McAloon =

Scottish footballer (1916–1987)

Personal information
- Full name: Gerald Padua McAloon
- Date of birth: 13 September 1916
- Place of birth: Gorbals, Scotland
- Date of death: 13 April 1987 (aged 70)
- Place of death: Glasgow, Scotland
- Height: 5 ft 9 1/2 in (1.77 m)
- Position: Inside forward

Youth career
- 1933–1934: St Francis

Senior career*
Years	Team	Apps	(Gls)
1934–1939	Brentford	21	(8)
1939–1945	Wolverhampton Wanderers	2	(1)
1945–1946	Brentford	7	(4)
1946–1948	Celtic	20	(12)
1948–1949	Belfast Celtic		(2)
- * Club domestic league appearances and goals

Gerald Padua McAloon (13 September 1916 – 13 April 1987) was a Scottish professional footballer who played as an inside forward in the Football League for Brentford and Wolverhampton Wanderers. He later played for Celtic and in Northern Ireland.

== Career ==
=== Early years ===
An inside forward, McAloon began his career with his hometown Glasgow junior club St Francis in 1933. He departed the following year.

=== Brentford ===
McAloon moved to England to sign for Second Division club Brentford in June 1934. Well down the forward line pecking order, he played exclusively for the reserve team between 1934 and 1938. McAloon's prolific goalscoring form in the first half of the 1937–38 season, with 18 goals, led manager Harry Curtis to give him his senior debut in a First Division match versus Middlesbrough on 26 March 1938, which resulted in a 1–0 win for Brentford. McAloon scored his first goal for the club in the following game (a 6–1 win over Grimsby Town) and he made a significant impact in the Bees' end-of-season run in, scoring five goals in six games to help the club to a second successive sixth-place finish. Brentford's league form was poor during the 1938–39 season and McAloon made 16 appearances, scoring four goals, before departing the club in March 1939. In a year as a first team player at Griffin Park, McAloon made 24 appearances and scored 9 goals.

=== Wolverhampton Wanderers ===
In March 1939, McAloon joined First Division high-flyers Wolverhampton Wanderers for a £5,000 fee. He made just two appearances (scoring one goal) before competitive football was suspended due to the outbreak of the Second World War in September 1939. McAloon departed Molineux in December 1945, after the cessation of hostilities.

==== Wartime guest appearances ====
During the Second World War, McAloon guested for Hamilton Academical, Airdrieonians, Albion Rovers, Dumbarton, Dunfermline Athletic, Celtic and Morton. He won the Lanarkshire Cup with Hamilton in 1939, scoring in a 5–1 victory over future club Airdrieonians in the final.

=== Return to Brentford ===
McAloon returned to Brentford in December 1945 and scored 23 goals in 27 Football League South and FA Cup appearances. After four goals and seven appearances early in the 1946–47 First Division season, McAloon departed Brentford once again. Across his two spells at Griffin Park, McAloon scored 18 goals in 37 appearances.

=== Return to Celtic ===
On 4 October 1946, McAloon transferred Scottish League Division A club Celtic, in exchange for George Paterson. He had previously guested for the club during the Second World War. Commuting from London to Glasgow for matches, McAloon failed to fully settle at the struggling club, but he finished the 1946–47 season as top scorer, with 15 goals in 24 appearances. He made just two appearances in the 1947–48 season, before departing Parkhead in August 1948.

=== Belfast Celtic ===
McAloon signed for high-flying Irish League club Belfast Celtic in August 1948. Commuting to Northern Ireland from London was again problematical for McAloon, though he managed 10 goals during the 1948–49 season, at the end of which the club withdrew from the Irish League.

== Personal life ==
After retiring as a footballer, McAloon worked as a janitor at Bridgeton School in Calton. On 13 April 1987, he died of hypothermia in Glasgow, at the age of 70.

== Career statistics ==
Appearances and goals by club, season and competition
Club	Season	League			National cup (Note: Includes FA Cup, Scottish Cup)		League cup (Note: Includes Scottish League Cup)		Other		Total	
Club	Season	Division	Apps	Goals	Apps	Goals	Apps	Goals	Apps	Goals	Apps	Goals
Brentford	1937–38	First Division	7	5	0	0	—		1 (Note: Appearance in Empire Exhibition Trophy)	0	8	5
Brentford	1938–39	First Division	14	3	1	0	—		—		15	3
Brentford	Total		21	8	1	0	—		1	0	23	8
Wolverhampton Wanderers	1938–39	First Division	2	1	—		—		—		2	1
Brentford	1945–46	—			7	6	—		—		7	6
Brentford	1946–47	First Division	7	4	—		—		—		7	4
Brentford	Total		28	12	8	6	—		1	0	37	18
Celtic	1946–47	Scottish Division A	19	13	1	1	4	1	—		24	15
Celtic	1947–48	Scottish Division A	1	0	0	0	1	0	—		2	0
Celtic	Total		20	13	1	1	4	1			26	15
Career total			48	25	9	7	4	1	1	0	63	33

== Honours ==
Hamilton Academical

- Lanarkshire Cup: 1939–40
