= Joe Crozier (footballer, born 1914) =

Scottish football goalkeeper (1914–1985)

Personal information
- Full name: Joseph Crozier
- Date of birth: 2 December 1914
- Place of birth: Coatbridge, Scotland
- Date of death: 27 July 1985 (aged 70)
- Place of death: Greenwich, England
- Position: Goalkeeper

Senior career*
Years	Team	Apps	(Gls)
–1934	Strathclyde		
1934–1937	East Fife	95	(0)
1937–1949	Brentford	200	(0)
1939–1941	→ Airdrieonians (guest)	59	(0)
1941–1942	→ Hibernian (guest)	43	(0)
1949–1951	Chelmsford City		
1951–1953	Kidderminster Harriers		
1953–1955	Ashford Town	25	(0)

International career
1943–1944	Scotland (wartime)	3	(0)
- * Club domestic league appearances and goals

Joseph Crozier (2 December 1914 – 27 July 1985) was a Scottish professional footballer who made 200 appearances in the Football League for Brentford as a goalkeeper. Crozier has been described as Brentford's best-ever goalkeeper and he is a member of the club's Hall of Fame. He represented Scotland in wartime international matches.

== Playing career ==
Crozier began his career at junior team Strathclyde and moved to Scottish League Second Division club East Fife in 1934. He made 100 appearances for the club and earned a £1,000 move to English First Division club Brentford in May 1937. Either side of the Second World War, Crozier made 224 appearances for the Bees. As a testament to his longevity, Crozier made 114 of his 200 league appearances consecutively and as of August 2023, his 25 top-flight clean sheets is the club record. During the war, Crozier played as a guest at Hibernian and Airdrieonians. He departed Brentford in 1949 and ended his career with spells at non-League clubs Chelmsford City, Kidderminster Harriers and Ashford Town.

== International career ==
Crozier won three unofficial caps for Scotland in three wartime internationals versus England in 1943 and 1944. He conceded 16 goals in three defeats. The final match at Hampden Park in April 1944 was witnessed by a wartime record 133,000 crowd.

== Personal life ==
Crozier served in the Royal Air Force during the Second World War. After retiring from football, he became managing director of Cory Lighterage and a Freeman of the City of London.

== Career statistics ==
Appearances and goals by club, season and competition
Club	Season	League			National cup (Note: Includes Scottish Cup, FA Cup)		Other		Total	
Club	Season	Division	Apps	Goals	Apps	Goals	Apps	Goals	Apps	Goals
East Fife	1934–35	Scottish Second Division	31	0	1	0	—		32	0
East Fife	1935–36	Scottish Second Division	33	0	1	0	—		34	0
East Fife	1936–37	Scottish Second Division	31	0	3	0	—		34	0
East Fife	Total		95	0	5	0	—		100	0
Brentford	1937–38	First Division	35	0	4	0	1 (Note: Appearance in Empire Exhibition Trophy)	0	40	0
Brentford	1938–39	First Division	42	0	1	0	—		43	0
Brentford	1945–46	—			8	0	—		8	0
Brentford	1946–47	First Division	42	0	4	0	—		46	0
Brentford	1947–48	Second Division	40	0	2	0	—		42	0
Brentford	1948–49	Second Division	41	0	4	0	—		45	0
Brentford	Total		200	0	23	0	1	0	224	0
Ashford Town	1953–54	Kent League	15	0	3	0	1 (Note: Appearance in Kent League Cup)	0	19	0
Ashford Town	1954–55	Kent League	10	0	0	0	0	0	10	0
Ashford Town	Total		25	0	3	0	1	0	29	0
Career total			320	0	31	0	2	0	353	0

== Honours ==
- Brentford Hall of Fame
