= Les Boulter =

Les Boulter may refer to:

- Les Boulter (Family Affairs), a character from the UK soap opera Family Affairs
- Les Boulter (footballer) (1913–1975), Welsh football inside left
