= John Glass =

John Glass may refer to:

- John Glass (administrator), acting Superintendent of Penang while Francis Light was attending to other duties
- John M. Glass (1843–1925), mayor and chief of police
- John P. Glass (1821–1868), speaker of the Pennsylvania House of Representatives
- John Judah Glass (1897–1973), Canadian politician
- John Glass (footballer) (1908–1991), Scottish footballer
- John Glass (1911–1998), Australian speedway rider under the pseudonym Mick Murphy (speedway rider)
- John Glass (academic), professor and synthetic biologist
