= Ron Griffin =

Ron Griffin may refer to:

- Ron Griffin (footballer) (1919–1987), English footballer
- Ron Griffin (artist) (born 1954), American artist
- Ron Griffin, the future sex-changed version of the Family Guy character Meg Griffin who appears in Stewie Griffin: The Untold Story
