= Degnan =

Degnan is a surname. Notable people with the surname include:

- Albert Degnan, Scottish footballer
- Georges Kablan Degnan (born 1953), Ivorian athlete
- John J. Degnan (born 1944), American politician and businessman
- Kelly C. Degnan, American diplomat
- Timothy F. Degnan (1940–2022), American politician
- Tom Degnan (born 1982), American actor
