= Neil McBain =

Scottish footballer and manager

Personal information
- Full name: Neil McBain
- Date of birth: 15 November 1895
- Place of birth: Campbeltown, Scotland
- Date of death: 13 May 1974 (aged 78)
- Place of death: Ayr, Scotland
- Height: 5 ft 8 in (1.73 m)
- Position: Half-back

Youth career
- Campbeltown Academicals

Senior career*
Years	Team	Apps	(Gls)
- Hamilton Academical
1914–1921	Ayr United	111	(12)
1921–1923	Manchester United	42	(2)
1923–1926	Everton	97	(1)
1926–1928	St Johnstone	38	(4)
1928	Liverpool	12	(0)
1928–1931	Watford	85	(5)
1947	New Brighton	1	(0)
Total		386	(24)

International career
1922–1924	Scotland	3	(0)

Managerial career
- 1929–1937: Watford
- 1937–1938: Ayr United
- 1938–1939: Luton Town
- 1946–1948: New Brighton
- 1948–1949: Leyton Orient
- 1949–1951: Estudiantes de La Plata
- 1955–1956: Ayr United
- 1956–1959: Watford
- 1962–1963: Ayr United
- * Club domestic league appearances and goals

Neil McBain (15 November 1895 – 13 May 1974) was a Scottish professional football player and coach. He remains the oldest player to appear in an English Football League match aged 51 years.

== Playing career ==
=== Club ===
McBain, a wing half, began his senior football career in the summer of 1914, joining Ayr United, with whom he made his league debut on 20 March 1915 against Clyde. He served in the Black Watch and then transferred to the Royal Navy during World War I. He moved to Manchester United in November 1921 for a fee of £4,600.

In January 1923, after 42 league games for United, McBain moved to Everton, costing the Goodison Park side £4,200. He played 97 league games for Everton, leaving in July 1926 to join St Johnstone for a fee of £1,100.

He returned to Merseyside in March 1928, joining Liverpool, but played only 12 times before joining Watford in November the same year.

=== International ===
His Scotland international debut came in April 1922 while he was with Manchester United, in a 1–0 victory against England at Villa Park. He won two further caps while with Everton, in 1923 against Ireland and in 1924 against Wales.

== Coaching and managerial career ==
He was appointed player-manager of Watford in 1929, retiring as a player in 1931 after playing 85 times for Watford. He left Watford in August 1937 and took over as manager of Ayr United later that year. In June 1938 he returned to England, as manager of Luton Town, but left Luton in June 1939.

He was appointed as manager of New Brighton in June 1946.

On 15 March 1947, for the match against Hartlepool United, New Brighton had an injury crisis among their goalkeepers with none being available. McBain opted to play in goal against himself at the age of 51 years and 120 days (and almost exactly 32 years after his professional debut) and so became the oldest player to appear in a football league match, a record he still holds. New Brighton lost the match by three goals to nil.

He was sacked by New Brighton in February 1948 with the club bottom of the league. Later that month he joined Leyton Orient as assistant to Charlie Hewitt, but in August 1948 took over as manager after Hewitt left to rejoin Millwall. In August 1949, McBain left Orient to manage Argentine side Estudiantes de La Plata.

McBain returned to Ayr United, as manager, in 1955, taking the club to promotion as Scottish Division Two runners-up in 1956, but in August 1956 left to manage Watford for a second time, his second spell lasting until February 1959.

His final spell as a manager came again at Ayr United, between 1962 and 1963. He died in 1974, aged 78.

Sporting positions
Preceded by William James Sawyer	New Brighton A.F.C. manager 1946–1948	Succeeded by Jack Atkinson
