= John Wray =

John Wray may refer to:

- John Wray (politician) (born 1971), Texas House of Representatives
- John Ray (1628–1705), who wrote his last name as Wray until 1670, English naturalist sometimes referred to as the father of English natural history
- Sir John Wray, 2nd Baronet (1586–1655), English politician
- Sir John Wray, 3rd Baronet (1619–1664), English politician
- John Wray (actor) (1887–1940), American character actor of stage and screen
- John Wray (missionary), first pastor of Mission Chapel, New Amsterdam in Guyana
- John Wray (novelist) (born 1971), American novelist
- John Wray (civil servant) (1782–1869), first Receiver of the London Metropolitan Police
- John Griffith Wray (1881–1929), American film director

== See also ==
- John Ray (disambiguation)
- John Rae (disambiguation)
- Jon Wray (born 1970), English rugby union and rugby league footballer who played in the 1990s and 2000s
