= David Parker (footballer, born 1915) =

English footballer

Personal information
- Full name: William David Parker
- Date of birth: 27 May 1915
- Place of birth: Liverpool, England
- Date of death: October 1980 (aged 65)
- Position: Full back

Youth career
- Linacre

Senior career*
Years	Team	Apps	(Gls)
–1937	Marine		
1937–1938	Hull City	30	(0)
1938–1939	Wolverhampton Wanderers	3	(0)
1946	Marine		
1946–1947	South Liverpool		
- Formby
- * Club domestic league appearances and goals

William David Parker (27 May 1915 – October 1980) was an English professional footballer who played in the Football League for Hull City and Wolverhampton Wanderers as a full back.

== Career statistics ==
Appearances and goals by club, season and competition
Club	Season	League			FA Cup		Other		Total	
Club	Season	Division	Apps	Goals	Apps	Goals	Apps	Goals	Apps	Goals
Hull City	1937–38	Third Division North	30	0	3	0	1 (Note: Appearance in Third Division North Cup)	0	34	0
Wolverhampton Wanderers	1938–39	First Division	3	0	0	0	―		3	0
Career total			33	0	3	0	1	0	37	0
