= Duncan McKenzie (footballer, born 1912) =

Scottish footballer

Personal information
- Full name: Duncan McKenzie
- Date of birth: 10 August 1912
- Place of birth: Glasgow, Scotland
- Date of death: 1987 (aged 74–75)
- Place of death: United States
- Height: 5 ft 10 in (1.78 m)
- Position: Half back

Youth career
- –1930: Milton Parish Church

Senior career*
Years	Team	Apps	(Gls)
1930–1932	Albion Rovers	66	(7)
1932–1938	Brentford	154	(10)
1938–1945	Middlesbrough	28	(0)
1939–1945	→ Brentford (guest)	130	(16)
1945	→ Chelmsford City (guest)	2	(0)

International career
1938	Scotland	1	(0)
- * Club domestic league appearances and goals

Duncan McKenzie (10 August 1912 – 1987) was a Scottish professional footballer who made over 150 appearances in the Football League for Brentford as a right half. He was capped by Scotland at international level.

== Career ==
=== Albion Rovers ===
A centre half, McKenzie began his career at Scottish Second Division club Albion Rovers. He was an ever-present for Rovers during the 1931–32 season and departed the club at the end of the campaign.

=== Brentford ===
McKenzie moved to England and transferred to Third Division South club Brentford for a £350 fee during the 1932 off-season. His career at Griffin Park started slowly and he made just two appearances during the 1932–33 Third Division South title-winning season and then only 12 during the following season in the Second Division. After moving to the right half position, McKenzie broke into the team during the 1934–35 season, making 31 appearances and picking up the first silverware of his career when the Bees won promotion to the First Division as Second Division champions. He made regular appearances in Brentford's first spell in the top flight, before new signing Buster Brown in 1938 caused McKenzie to ask for a transfer. McKenzie made 161 appearances and scored 10 goals during his six years with the Bees. He was posthumously inducted into the Brentford Hall of Fame in November 2024.

=== Middlesbrough ===
McKenzie transferred to First Division club Middlesbrough in May 1938 for a £6,000 fee. He made 28 appearances before his professional career was ended by the breakout of the Second World War the following year.

=== Return to Brentford ===
McKenzie returned to Brentford as a guest during the Second World War and made over 150 appearances. The highlight of his time back at Griffin Park was winning the 1942 London War Cup at Wembley Stadium. In 1945, McKenzie also made five appearances in all competitions as a guest for Chelmsford City.

== International career ==
McKenzie's form in the First Division for Brentford led to a call up to the Scotland national team for a British Home Championship match versus Ireland on 10 November 1937. Included in the lineup with Brentford teammate and fellow debutant Bobby Reid, McKenzie helped the Scots to a 1–1 draw at Pittodrie.

== Personal life ==
After the war, McKenzie emigrated to the US and lived in San Diego. McKenzie's nephew Hamish was also a professional footballer and followed in his footsteps by signing for Brentford in 1964.

== Career statistics ==
Appearances and goals by club, season and competition
Club	Season	League			National cup (Note: Includes Scottish Cup, FA Cup)		Total	
Club	Season	Division	Apps	Goals	Apps	Goals	Apps	Goals
Albion Rovers	1929–30	Scottish Second Division	3	1	0	0	3	1
Albion Rovers	1930–31	Scottish Second Division	25	0	2	0	27	0
Albion Rovers	1931–32	Scottish Second Division	38	6	3	0	41	6
Albion Rovers	Total		66	7	5	0	71	7
Brentford	1932–33	Third Division South	2	0	0	0	2	0
Brentford	1933–34	Second Division	11	0	1	0	12	0
Brentford	1934–35	Second Division	30	0	1	0	31	0
Brentford	1935–36	First Division	38	1	1	0	39	1
Brentford	1936–37	First Division	42	5	2	0	44	5
Brentford	1937–38	First Division	31	4	2	0	33	4
Brentford	Total		154	10	7	0	161	10
Middlesbrough	1938–39	First Division	28	1	0	0	28	1
Career total			248	18	12	0	260	18

== Honours ==
Brentford

- Football League Second Division: 1934–35
- London War Cup: 1941–42

Individual

- Brentford Hall of Fame
