= John Ray (disambiguation) =

John Ray (1627–1705) was an English naturalist.

John Ray may also refer to:

- John Ray (American football) (1926–2007), American football player and coach
- John D. Ray (born 1945), English Egyptologist who deciphered the Carian script
- John H. Ray (1886–1975), American congressman
- John Ray (Louisiana politician) (1816–1888), American politician for Louisiana
- John J. Ray III (born 1959), American attorney known for overseeing several high-profile bankruptcies
- John L. Ray (1943–2025), American politician, Washington, D.C., council member
- John Ray (footballer) (born 1968), English footballer
- John Ray Jr., character in the Vladimir Nabokov novel Lolita

== See also ==
- John Ray Clemmons (born 1977), American member of the Tennessee House of Representatives
- John Ray Webster, American checkers player
- Johnny Ray (disambiguation)
- John Rae (disambiguation)
- Johnnie Ray (1927–1990), singer-songwriter
- John Wray (disambiguation)
