= Joe Wilson (footballer, born 1911) =

English footballer

Personal information
- Full name: Joseph William Wilson
- Date of birth: 29 September 1911
- Place of birth: Butsfield, England
- Date of death: 3 April 1996 (aged 84)
- Place of death: Consett, England
- Height: 6 ft 0 in (1.83 m)
- Position: Right back

Senior career*
Years	Team	Apps	(Gls)
–1926	Tow Law Town		
1926–	Crook Town		
–1927	Annfield Plain		
1927	Stanley United		
1927–1930	Newcastle United	1	(0)
1930–1935	Southend United	164	(4)
1935–1939	Brentford	60	(0)
1939	Reading	0	(0)
1946–1947	Barnsley	20	(0)
1947–1950	Blyth Spartans		

Managerial career
- 1948–1950: Blyth Spartans (player-manager)
- Consett
- * Club domestic league appearances and goals

Joseph William Wilson (29 September 1911 – 3 April 1996) was an English professional footballer who played in the Football League for Southend United, Brentford and Barnsley as a right back. He later managed non-League clubs Blyth Spartans and Consett.

== Career ==
=== Early years in non-League football ===
A right back, Wilson spent his early career moving around Northern and North Eastern League clubs Tow Law Town, Crook Town, Annfield Plain and Stanley United. He departed the latter club in December 1927.

=== Football League (1927–1947) ===
Wilson signed for First Division club Newcastle United for a £50 fee in December 1927. He had to wait until 7 December 1929 for his professional debut, which came in a 2–2 draw with Aston Villa at St James' Park. Wilson departed the club in July 1930 and transferred to Third Division South club Southend United for a £500 fee. He remained at Roots Hall for five seasons and made 175 appearances, scoring four goals. Wilson signed for newly promoted First Division club Brentford in June 1935 and made 23 appearances during the 1935–36 season. He gradually fell out of the first team picture over the following three seasons and departed Griffin Park in August 1939. He made 65 appearances and scored one goal in four years with the Bees.

Wilson transferred Third Division South club Reading in August 1939, but his career was brought to a halt after just three appearances by the outbreak of the Second World War the following month. In May 1946, after the war, Wilson signed for Second Division club Barnsley and made 20 appearances during the 1946–47 season.

=== Return to non-League football ===
Wilson ended his playing career with North Eastern League club Blyth Spartans and after initially serving as player-coach, he player-managed the club between 1948 and 1950. He later managed North Eastern League club Consett.

== Personal life ==
Wilson's son Carl also became a professional footballer and played for Newcastle United, Gateshead, Doncaster Rovers, Millwall and Sparta Rotterdam.

== Career statistics ==
Appearances and goals by club, season and competition
Club	Season	League			FA Cup		Other		Total	
Club	Season	Division	Apps	Goals	Apps	Goals	Apps	Goals	Apps	Goals
Southend United	Total		164	4	8	0	3	0	175	4
Newcastle United	1930–31	First Division	1	0	0	0	—		1	0
Brentford	1935–36	First Division	22	0	1	0	—		23	0
Brentford	1936–37	First Division	13	0	2	0	—		15	0
Brentford	1937–38	First Division	15	0	2	1	—		17	1
Brentford	1938–39	First Division	10	0	0	0	—		10	0
Brentford	Total		60	0	5	1	—		65	1
Career total			225	4	13	1	3	0	254	5
