= Carl Wilson (footballer) =

English footballer (1940–2019)

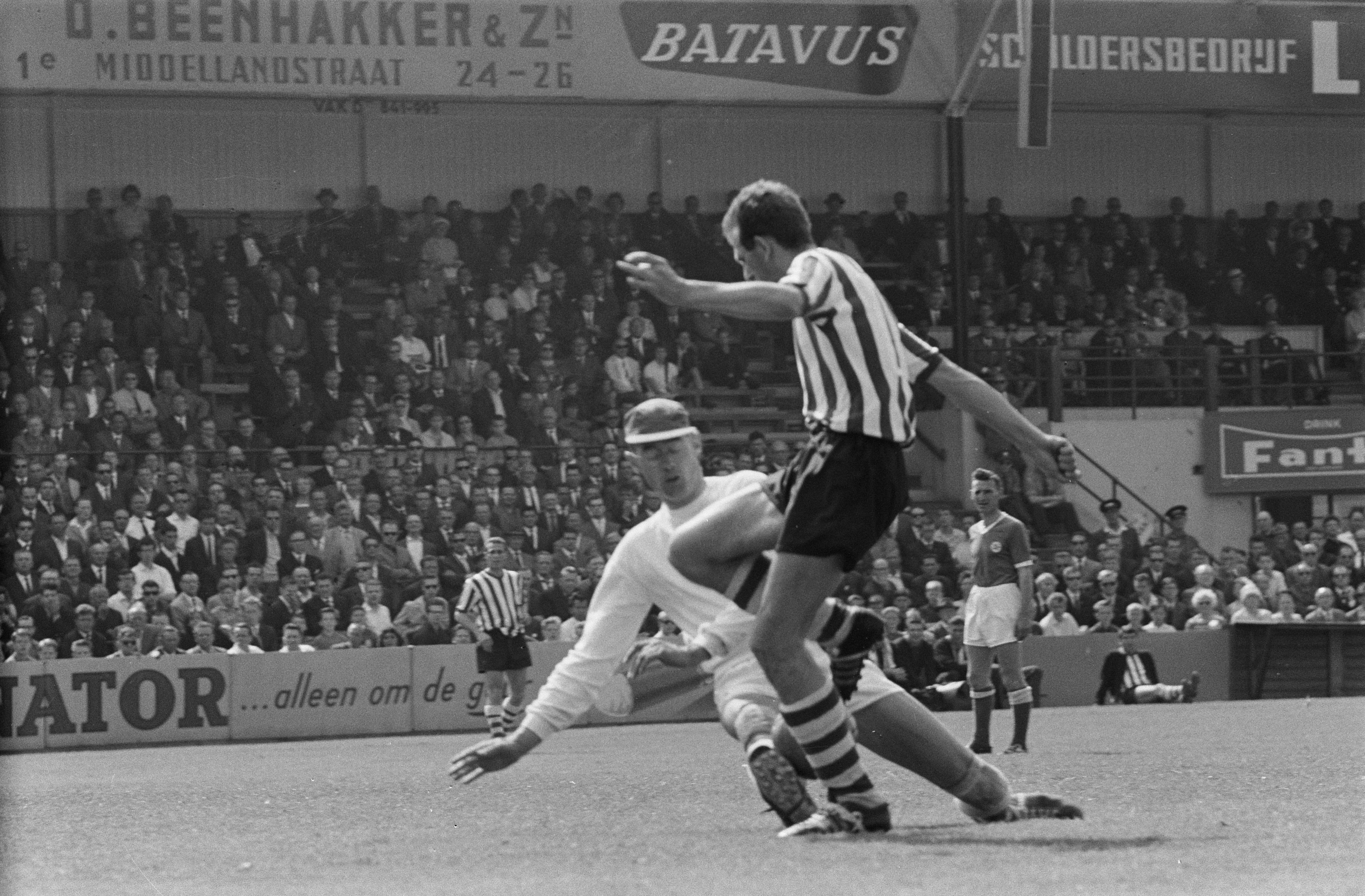
- Carl Wilson (right) in duel with Otto Roffel, 1963

Personal information
- Full name: Carl Alan Wilson
- Date of birth: 8 May 1940
- Place of birth: Consett, England
- Date of death: 24 January 2019 (aged 78)
- Place of death: Durham, England
- Position: Centre forward

Youth career
- Delves Lane Juniors

Senior career*
Years	Team	Apps	(Gls)
1958–1960	Newcastle United	1	(0)
1960	Gateshead	17	(4)
1960–1961	Doncaster Rovers	15	(2)
1961–1962	Millwall	5	(1)
1962–1963	Sparta Rotterdam	11	(4)
1963	Schwarz-Weiß Essen	4	(2)
- * Club domestic league appearances and goals

Carl Alan Wilson (8 May 1940 – 24 January 2019) was an English professional footballer who played in the Football League for Gateshead, Doncaster Rovers, Millwall and Newcastle United as a centre forward. He also played in the Netherlands and Germany for Sparta Rotterdam and Schwarz-Weiß Essen respectively.

== Personal life ==
Wilson's father Joe was also a professional footballer, most notably for Southend United.

== Career statistics ==
Appearances and goals by club, season and competition
Club	Season	League			National cup		League cup		Europe		Total	
Club	Season	Division	Apps	Goals	Apps	Goals	Apps	Goals	Apps	Goals	Apps	Goals
Newcastle United	1958–59	First Division	1	0	0	0	—		—		1	0
Millwall	1961–62	Fourth Division	5	1	0	0	0	0	—		5	1
Sparta Rotterdam	1961–62	Eredivisie	1	1	—		—		—		1	1
Sparta Rotterdam	1962–63	Eredivisie	10	3	1	0	—		2 (Note: Appearances in European Cup)	3	13	6
Sparta Rotterdam	Total		11	4	1	0	—		2	3	14	7
Schwarz-Weiß Essen	1963–64	Regionalliga West	4	2	0	0	—		—		4	2
Career total			21	7	1	0	0	0	2	3	24	10
