= Magnus Mowatt =

Scottish footballer (1917–1979)

Personal information
- Full name: Magnus James Mowatt
- Date of birth: 13 March 1917
- Place of birth: Fraserburgh, Scotland
- Date of death: 1979 (aged 68)
- Place of death: Glasgow, Scotland
- Position: Outside right

Youth career
- –1935: Morton Juniors

Senior career*
Years	Team	Apps	(Gls)
1935–1937	Clyde	8	(2)
1936–1937	→ Dumbarton (loan)	31	(6)
1937–1938	Brentford	0	(0)
1938–1939	Lincoln City	6	(1)
1939–1940	Morton	5	(0)
- * Club domestic league appearances and goals

Magnus James Mowatt (13 March 1917 – 1979) was a Scottish professional footballer who played as an outside right in the Scottish League for Clyde and Dumbarton. He also played in the Football League for Lincoln City.

== Career statistics ==
Appearances and goals by club, season and competition
Club	Season	League			National Cup		Total	
Club	Season	Division	Apps	Goals	Apps	Goals	Apps	Goals
Clyde	1935–36	Scottish First Division	8	2	2	0	10	2
Dumbarton (loan)	1936–37	Scottish Second Division	31	6	2	0	33	6
Lincoln City	1938–39	Third Division North	6	1	0	0	6	1
Career total			45	9	4	0	49	9
