= Jimmy Hindson =

English footballer

Personal information
- Full name: James Bell Hindson
- Date of birth: 15 July 1908
- Place of birth: Sunderland, England
- Date of death: 1950 (aged 41–42)
- Height: 5 ft 11 in (1.80 m)
- Position: Full back

Senior career*
Years	Team	Apps	(Gls)
- Hylton Colliery
1928	Sunderland	0	(0)
- Spennymoor United
1930	Middlesbrough	0	(0)
1931–1937	Fulham	104	(0)
- * Club domestic league appearances and goals

James Bell Hindson (15 July 1908 – 1950) was an English professional footballer who made over 100 Football League appearances as a full back for Fulham.

== Career statistics ==
Appearances and goals by club, season and competition
Club	Season	League			FA Cup		Total	
Club	Season	Division	Apps	Goals	Apps	Goals	Apps	Goals
Fulham	1931–32	Third Division South	6	0	1	0	7	0
Fulham	1932–33	Second Division	10	0	0	0	10	0
Fulham	1933–34	Second Division	20	0	1	0	21	0
Fulham	1934–35	Second Division	27	0	0	0	27	0
Fulham	1935–36	Second Division	33	0	6	0	39	0
Fulham	1936–37	Second Division	4	0	0	0	4	0
Fulham	1937–38	Second Division	4	0	1	0	5	0
Career total			104	0	9	0	113	0
