= Robert Smith (footballer, born 1912) =

English footballer and manager (1912–?)

Robert Smith (born 15 December 1912 or 1913, date of death unknown) was an English football player and manager born in Atherton, near Wigan, Lancashire. After early trials with Bolton Wanderers he played three seasons, from 1931 to 1934 with Bolton before leaving to join Huddersfield Town. He managed Dutch club Ajax between 1947 and 1948.

== Personal life ==
Robert was born in Atherton, the son of Louisa Jane Cowburn and Joseph Smith.
