= Johnny Ray =

Johnny Ray may refer to:

- Johnny Ray (racing driver) (1937–2020), former NASCAR driver and team owner
- Johnny Ray (outfielder) (1911–1957), American Negro league baseball player
- Johnny Ray (second baseman) (born 1957), former second baseman for the Pittsburgh Pirates and California Angels
- Johnny Ray (comedian), American actor of Puerto Rican descent
- Johnny Ray (Latin singer), born Johnny Zamot, Puerto Rican Latin singer, see Ray Sepúlveda

== See also ==
- Johnny Rae (1934-1993), American jazz drummer and vibraphonist
- Johnnie Ray (1927–1990), American singer-songwriter
- John Ray (disambiguation)
