= Les Boulter (footballer) =

Welsh footballer (1913–1974)

Personal information
- Full name: Leslie Mervyn Boulter
- Date of birth: 31 August 1913
- Place of birth: Ebbw Vale, Wales
- Date of death: 30 November 1974 (aged 61)
- Height: 5 ft 8 in (1.73 m)
- Position: Inside left

Youth career
- Cwm Athletic

Senior career*
| Years | Team | Apps | (Gls) |
| 1932–1939 | Charlton Athletic | 167 | (27) |
| 1939–1947 | Brentford | 16 | (1) |
| 1940 | → Manchester City (guest) | 1 | (0) |
- → Blackpool (guest)
| 1947–1948 | Yeovil Town | | (4) |

International career
| 1939 | Wales | 1 | (1) |
- * Club domestic league appearances and goals

Leslie Mervyn Boulter (31 August 1913 – 30 November 1974) was a Welsh professional footballer, best remembered for his time as an inside left in the Football League with Charlton Athletic, with whom he ascended from the Third Division South to the First Division in successive seasons in the mid-1930s. He scored on his only appearance for Wales at international level.

== Club career ==
=== Charlton Athletic ===
An inside left, Boulter began his career at Second Division club Charlton Athletic. After suffering relegation to the Third Division South in 1933, Boulter was part of the team which completed a meteoric rise to First Division, in two seasons, securing the Third Division South title in 1934–35 and a runners-up finish in the Second Division in 1935–36. The Addicks challenged for the league championship in their first three seasons in the top-flight. Boulter departed The Valley in February 1939, after making 176 appearances and scoring 29 goals during his time with the club.

=== Brentford ===
Boulter moved to London First Division rivals Brentford in February 1939, for a £5,000 fee. Signing on the same day as forward Tommy Cheetham, the pair made their debuts in a 4–2 defeat to Aston Villa on 7 February. He scored his first goal for the club in a 1–1 draw with Bolton Wanderers just over a month later. Boulter and Cheetham's signings boosted the struggling Bees into mid-table, but a late slump saw the club narrowly avoid relegation. Boulter made just one appearance in the 1939–40 season (before competitive football was suspended due to the outbreak of the Second World War), which came in a 5–1 Football League Jubilee Fund defeat to Chelsea on 19 August 1939.

Boulter was held on a retainer throughout the war by Brentford and was transfer-listed at the end of the 1946–47 season, due to concerns over his weight and lack of speed upon his return from Army service. He re-signed in May 1946 and departed the club in 1947, without having made any further competitive appearances. Boulter made 17 competitive appearances and scored one goal during his time at Griffin Park.

==== Wartime guest appearances ====
Boulter appeared as a guest for Manchester City, Blackpool and Fulham during the Second World War.

=== Yeovil Town ===
Boulter dropped into non-League football to sign for Southern League club Yeovil Town in 1947. He scored five goals during the 1947–48 season and helped the Glovers to an eighth-place finish.

== International career ==
Boulter won one cap for Wales, scoring in a 3–1 British Home Championship victory over Ireland on 15 March 1939.

== Career statistics ==
Appearances and goals by club, season and competition
| Club | Season | League | | | FA Cup | | Total | |
| Club | Season | Division | Apps | Goals | Apps | Goals | Apps | Goals |
|---|---|---|---|---|---|---|---|---|
| Charlton Athletic | 1936–37 | First Division | 34 | 6 | 0 | 0 | 34 | 6 |
| Charlton Athletic | 1937–38 | First Division | 34 | 5 | 0 | 0 | 34 | 5 |
| Charlton Athletic | 1938–39 | First Division | 22 | 3 | 0 | 0 | 22 | 3 |
| Charlton Athletic | Total | | 90 | 14 | 0 | 0 | 90 | 14 |
| Brentford | 1938–39 | First Division | 16 | 1 | — | | 16 | 1 |
| Career total | | | 106 | 1 | 0 | 0 | 106 | 1 |

== Honours ==
Charlton Athletic

- Football League Second Division second-place promotion: 1935–36
- Football League Third Division South: 1934–35
