= Stephen Murray (footballer) =

Scottish footballer

Personal information
- Full name: Stephen Murray
- Date of birth: 1913
- Place of birth: Dumbarton, Scotland

Youth career
- Kirkintilloch Rob Roy

Senior career*
Years	Team	Apps	(Gls)
1935–1936	Stenhousemuir		
1936–1940	Dumbarton	96	(21)
- * Club domestic league appearances and goals

Stephen Murray was a Scottish football player, who played for Stenhousemuir and Dumbarton during the 1930s.
