= Jim Mathieson (footballer) =

Australian rules footballer

Personal information
- Full name: James Mathieson
- Born: 29 November 1892; Panmure, Victoria
- Died: 21 April 1982 (aged 89); Cobden, Victoria
- Original team: Cobden
- Height: 183 cm (6 ft 0 in)
- Weight: 82 kg (181 lb)
- Position: Follower / Forward

Playing career^{1}
Years	Club	Games (Goals)
1920–24	Geelong	71 (37)
- ^{1} Playing statistics correct to the end of 1924.

James Mathieson (29 November 1892 – 21 April 1982) was an Australian rules footballer who played with Geelong in the Victorian Football League (VFL).
