= Jack Atkinson (Australian footballer) =

Australian rules footballer

Personal information
- Full name: Jack Atkinson
- Born: 23 June 1928 (age 98)
- Original team: Redan
- Height: 187 cm (6 ft 2 in)
- Weight: 79 kg (174 lb)

Playing career^{1}
Years	Club	Games (Goals)
1950	Richmond	3 (5)
- ^{1} Playing statistics correct to the end of 1950.

Jack Atkinson (born 23 June 1928) is a former Australian rules footballer who played with Richmond in the Victorian Football League (VFL).
