= Buster Brown (footballer) =

English footballer (1910–1993)

Personal information
- Full name: William Ian Brown
- Date of birth: 6 September 1910
- Place of birth: Silvertown, England
- Date of death: 15 January 1993 (aged 82)
- Place of death: Ealing, England
- Position: Utility player

Youth career
- Fairbairn House
- –1930: Silvertown

Senior career*
Years	Team	Apps	(Gls)
1930–1934	Luton Town	49	(4)
1934–1937	Huddersfield Town	20	(2)
1937–1947	Brentford	92	(2)
1947–1948	Leyton Orient	26	(0)
- Chingford Town
- * Club domestic league appearances and goals

William Ian Brown (6 September 1910 – 15 January 1993) was a professional footballer who played a number of positions in the Football League for Brentford, Luton Town, Leyton Orient and Huddersfield Town.

== Career ==
Brown began his career in non-League football with Fairbairn House and Silvertown, before joining Third Division South club Luton Town in 1930. He made shy of 50 league appearances in four seasons at Kenilworth Road, before moving to the top flight with Huddersfield Town in 1934. He was used sparingly before joining First Division rivals Brentford in March 1937 as a replacement for Dai Richards. He quickly became a regular with the Bees, playing in both full back positions, at half back and centre forward during the 2 1/2 years before the Second World War intervened. Brown remained with Brentford during the war, with his 246 appearances being the most by any Brentford player during wartime. He dropped down to the Fourth Division to sign for Leyton Orient in May 1947, before ending his career in the Southern League with Chingford Town the following year.

== Career statistics ==
Appearances and goals by club, season and competition
Club	Season	League			FA Cup		Other		Total	
Club	Season	Division	Apps	Goals	Apps	Goals	Apps	Goals	Apps	Goals
Luton Town	1930–31	Third Division South	6	2	0	0	—		6	2
Luton Town	1932–33	Third Division South	12	0	2	0	—		14	0
Luton Town	1933–34	Third Division South	8	1	0	0	1 (Note: Appearance(s) in Third Division South Cup)	0	9	1
Luton Town	1934–35	Third Division South	23	1	3	0	2	0	28	1
Luton Town	Total		49	4	5	0	3	0	57	4
Huddersfield Town	1934–35	First Division	1	1	—		—		1	1
Huddersfield Town	1935–36	First Division	19	1	2	0	—		21	1
Huddersfield Town	Total		20	2	2	0	—		22	2
Brentford	1936–37	First Division	10	0	—		—		10	0
Brentford	1937–38	First Division	41	0	4	0	1 (Note: Appearance in Empire Exhibition Trophy)	0	46	0
Brentford	1938–39	First Division	33	2	1	0	—		34	2
Brentford	1945–46	—			8	0	—		8	0
Brentford	1946–47	First Division	8	0	0	0	—		8	0
Brentford	Total		92	2	13	0	1	0	106	2
Career total			161	8	20	0	4	0	185	8

== Honours ==
Brentford

- London War Cup: 1941–42
