= Hugh MacFarlane =

Scottish footballer (1916–1968)

Personal information
- Full name: Hugh Morton MacFarlane
- Date of birth: 1916
- Place of birth: Partick, Scotland
- Date of death: 1968 (aged 52)
- Place of death: Rutherglen, Scotland
- Positions: Inside forward; centre half

Senior career*
Years	Team	Apps	(Gls)
- Rutherglen Glencairn
1934–1938	Clyde	9	(0)
1936–1937	Dumbarton (loan)	29	(2)
1938–1946	Alloa Athletic	31	(0)
- * Club domestic league appearances and goals

Hugh Morton MacFarlane (1916–1968) was a Scottish footballer who played for Clyde, Dumbarton, Alloa Athletic and Celtic (wartime guest).
