= Doug Anderson (footballer, born 1914) =

Scottish footballer

Personal information
- Full name: Douglas Nicol Anderson
- Date of birth: 25 March 1914
- Place of birth: Stonehaven, Scotland
- Date of death: 9 November 1989 (aged 75)
- Place of death: Garstang, England
- Position: Left back

Youth career
- Stonehaven

Senior career*
Years	Team	Apps	(Gls)
1934–1935	Aberdeen	1	(0)
1935–1936	Dundee United	27	(6)
1936–1937	Hibernian	8	(1)
1937–1940	Brentford	1	(0)
1940	Falkirk	3	(0)
1940–?	Brentford	0	(0)
1941	→ Clapton Orient (guest)	1	(0)
- Derry City
- * Club domestic league appearances and goals

Douglas Nicol Anderson (25 March 1914 – 9 November 1989) was a Scottish professional footballer who played as a left back in the Football League and Scottish League.

== Career statistics ==
Appearances and goals by club, season and competition
Club	Season	League			National cup (Note: Includes Scottish Cup, FA Cup)		Total	
Club	Season	Division	Apps	Goals	Apps	Goals	Apps	Goals
Aberdeen	1934–35	Scottish First Division	1	0	0	0	1	0
Dundee United	1935–36	Scottish Second Division	27	6	0	0	27	6
Hibernian	1936–37	Scottish First Division	8	1	0	0	8	1
Brentford	1938–39	First Division	1	0	0	0	1	0
Career total			37	7	0	0	37	7
