= Les Sinton =

English footballer

Personal information
- Full name: Leslie Wanford Sinton
- Date of birth: 30 December 1915
- Place of birth: Newcastle upon Tyne, England
- Position: Outside right

Senior career*
Years	Team	Apps	(Gls)
1937–1938	Brentford	0	(0)
1938	Gateshead	3	(0)
- * Club domestic league appearances and goals

Leslie Wanford Sinton (born December 30, 1915) was an English professional footballer who played in the Football League for Gateshead as an outside right.
