= 1936–37 Scottish Division Two =

Scottish Second Division
- Season: 1936–37
- Champions: Ayr United
- Promoted: Ayr United; Morton

The 1936–37 Scottish Second Division was won by Ayr United who, along with second placed Morton, were promoted to the First Division. Edinburgh City finished bottom.

== Table ==
| Pos | Team | Pld | W | D | L | GF | GA | GD | Pts | Promotion or relegation |
|---|---|---|---|---|---|---|---|---|---|---|
| 1 | Ayr United | 34 | 25 | 4 | 5 | 122 | 49 | +73 | 54 | Promotion to the 1937–38 First Division |
| 2 | Morton | 34 | 23 | 5 | 6 | 110 | 42 | +68 | 51 | Promotion to the 1937–38 First Division |
| 3 | St Bernard's | 34 | 22 | 4 | 8 | 100 | 51 | +49 | 48 | |
| 4 | Airdrieonians | 34 | 18 | 8 | 8 | 85 | 60 | +25 | 44 | |
| 5 | East Fife | 34 | 15 | 8 | 11 | 76 | 51 | +25 | 38 | |
| 6 | Cowdenbeath | 34 | 14 | 10 | 10 | 75 | 59 | +16 | 38 | |
| 7 | East Stirlingshire | 34 | 18 | 2 | 14 | 81 | 78 | +3 | 38 | |
| 8 | Raith Rovers | 34 | 16 | 4 | 14 | 72 | 66 | +6 | 36 | |
| 9 | Alloa Athletic | 34 | 13 | 7 | 14 | 64 | 65 | −1 | 33 | |
| 10 | Stenhousemuir | 34 | 14 | 4 | 16 | 82 | 86 | −4 | 32 | |
| 11 | Leith Athletic | 34 | 13 | 5 | 16 | 62 | 65 | −3 | 31 | |
| 12 | Forfar Athletic | 34 | 11 | 8 | 15 | 73 | 89 | −16 | 30 | |
| 13 | Montrose | 34 | 11 | 6 | 17 | 65 | 98 | −33 | 28 | |
| 14 | Dundee United | 34 | 9 | 9 | 16 | 72 | 97 | −25 | 27 | |
| 15 | Dumbarton | 34 | 11 | 5 | 18 | 57 | 83 | −26 | 27 | |
| 16 | Brechin City | 34 | 8 | 9 | 17 | 64 | 98 | −34 | 25 | |
| 17 | King's Park | 34 | 11 | 3 | 20 | 61 | 106 | −45 | 25 | |
| 18 | Edinburgh City | 34 | 2 | 3 | 29 | 42 | 120 | −78 | 7 | |

Source: "1936-1937 Division 2 - SPFL Archive". SPFL.
