= Albert Degnan =

Scottish footballer

Personal information
- Full name: Albert Degnan
- Place of birth: Scotland
- Position: Outside right

Senior career*
Years	Team	Apps	(Gls)
–1938	Rutherglen Glencairn		
1938–	Charlton Athletic	0	(0)
–1939	Brentford	0	(0)
1939–1946	Albion Rovers	65	(18)
1946–1947	Alloa Athletic	2	(0)
- * Club domestic league appearances and goals

Albert Degnan was a Scottish professional footballer who played in the Scottish League for Alloa Athletic as an outside right. He played in a friendly match for an Army XI (represented by the Scottish Command) versus a Scotland XI in 1940.

== Career statistics ==
Appearances and goals by club, season and competition
Club	Season	League			National Cup		Total	
Club	Season	Division	Apps	Goals	Apps	Goals	Apps	Goals
Alloa Athletic	1946–47	Scottish Second Division	2	0	0	0	2	0
Career total			2	0	0	0	2	0
