= Ron Griffin (footballer) =

English footballer

Personal information
- Full name: Ronald Henry George Griffin
- Date of birth: 18 October 1919
- Place of birth: Camberwell Green, England
- Date of death: February 1987 (aged 67)
- Position: Outside right

Senior career*
Years	Team	Apps	(Gls)
–1937	Larkhall Thistle		
1937–1938	St Mirren	5	(0)
1938–	Lincoln City	1	(0)
–1939	Brentford	0	(0)
1939	Watford (trial)	0	(0)
- * Club domestic league appearances and goals

Ronald Henry George Griffin (18 October 1919 – February 1987) was an English professional football outside right who played in the Scottish League for St Mirren. He also made one appearance in the Football League for Lincoln City.

== Career statistics ==
Appearances and goals by club, season and competition
Club	Season	League			National Cup		Total	
Club	Season	Division	Apps	Goals	Apps	Goals	Apps	Goals
St Mirren	1937–38	Scottish First Division	5	0	0	0	5	0
Lincoln City	1938–39	Third Division North	1	0	0	0	1	0
Career total			6	0	0	0	6	0
