= George Eastham Sr. =

English footballer (1913–2000)

George Eastham
Personal information
- Full name: George Richard Eastham
- Date of birth: 13 September 1913
- Place of birth: Blackpool, Lancashire, England
- Date of death: 28 January 2000 (aged 86)
- Place of death: Milnerton, Cape Town, South Africa
- Position: Inside forward

Youth career
- Cambridge Juniors
- –1932: South Shore Wednesday
- 1932–1933: Bolton Wanderers

Senior career*
Years	Team	Apps	(Gls)
1933–1937	Bolton Wanderers	114	(16)
1937–1938	Brentford	49	(1)
1938–1947	Blackpool	44	(9)
	→ Birmingham City (war guest)	16	(3)
	→ Bolton Wanderers (war guest)	8	(2)
	→ Brentford (war guest)	2	(0)
	→ York City (war guest)	4	(0)
	→ Mansfield Town (war guest)	1	(0)
	→ Millwall (war guest)	2	(1)
	→ Queens Park Rangers (war guest)	8	(2)
1947–1948	Swansea Town	15	(0)
1948–1949	Rochdale	2	(0)
1949–1950	Lincoln City	27	(1)
1950–1951	Hyde United	18	(5)
1951–1953	Winsford United		
1953–1958	Ards	68	(13)

International career
1935	England	1	(0)

Managerial career
- 1953–1958: Ards
- 1958–1959: Accrington Stanley
- 1959–1964: Distillery
- 1964–1970: Ards
- 1971–1972: Hellenic F.C.
- 1972–1974: Glentoran
- * Club domestic league appearances and goals

George Richard Eastham (13 September 1913 – 28 January 2000) was an English football player and manager. An inside forward, he represented England once at international level, and played for Bolton Wanderers, Brentford, Blackpool, Swansea Town, Rochdale and Lincoln City. He is the father of George Eastham Jr. and the brother of Harry Eastham.
