= John Rae (footballer, born 1912) =

Scottish footballer

Personal information
- Full name: John Rae
- Date of birth: 1912
- Place of birth: Blackmill, Scotland
- Date of death: 4 November 2007 (aged 94–95)
- Position: Centre forward

Senior career*
Years	Team	Apps	(Gls)
–	Camelon Juniors		
1935–1936	Clyde	6	(2)
1936–1937	Dumbarton	15	(9)
1937	East Stirlingshire	15	(11)
1938	Bristol City	2	(0)
- * Club domestic league appearances and goals

John Rae (born 1912, date of death unknown) was a Scottish footballer who played for Clyde, Dumbarton, East Stirlingshire and Bristol City. He worked as a scout at the latter for several decades.
