= 1938–39 Wolverhampton Wanderers F.C. season =

English football club season

Wolverhampton Wanderers
1938–39 season
- Manager: Major Frank Buckley
- First Division: 2nd
- FA Cup: Runners-up
- Top goalscorer: League: Dennis Westcott (32); All: Dennis Westcott (43)
- Highest home attendance: 61,305 (vs Liverpool, 11 February 1939; club record)
- Lowest home attendance: 18,420 (vs Charlton, 15 April 1939)
- Average home league attendance: 29,335 (league only)
Home colours

The 1938–39 season was the 47th season of competitive league football in the history of English football club Wolverhampton Wanderers. They played in the top tier of the English football system, the Football League First Division.

The team finished as runners-up for a second consecutive season and also finished as FA Cup runners-up when they lost the FA Cup final to outsiders Portsmouth. This was to be the final full league campaign until 1946–47 as the following season was cancelled and annulled in September 1939 after the outbreak of World War II.

== Results ==
=== Football League First Division ===
Final table

Pos	Club	Pld	W	D	L	F	A	GA	Pts
1	Everton	42	27	5	10	88	52	1.692	59
2	Wolverhampton Wanderers	42	22	11	9	88	39	2.256	55
3	Charlton Athletic	42	22	6	14	75	59	1.271	50

Pld = Matches played; W = Matches won; D = Matches drawn; L = Matches lost; F = Goals for; A = Goals against; GA = Goal average; Pts = Points

=== FA Cup ===
7 January 1939 R3	Wolverhampton Wanderers	3–1	Bradford Park Avenue	Wolverhampton
				Stadium: Molineux; Attendance: 23,845

21 January 1939 R4	Wolverhampton Wanderers	5–1	Leicester City	Wolverhampton
				Stadium: Molineux; Attendance: 43,205

11 February 1939 R5	Wolverhampton Wanderers	4–1	Liverpool	Wolverhampton
				Stadium: Molineux; Attendance: 61,305

4 March 1939 QF	Wolverhampton Wanderers	2–0	Everton	Wolverhampton
				Stadium: Molineux; Attendance: 59,545

25 March 1939 SF	Wolverhampton Wanderers	5–0	Grimsby Town	Manchester
				Stadium: Old Trafford; Attendance: 76,962

29 April 1939 Final	Portsmouth	4–1	Wolverhampton Wanderers	London
15:00	Barlow 29'; Anderson 43'; Parker 46', 71'		Dorsett 54'	Stadium: Wembley Stadium; Attendance: 99,370

== Players Used ==
Pos.	Nationality	Player	Football League	FA Cup	Total	Goal
1	[[|]]	[[ ]]			0
2	[[|]]	[[ ]]			0
3	[[|]]	[[ ]]			0
4	[[|]]	[[ ]]			0
5	[[|]]	[[ ]]			0
6	[[|]]	[[ ]] (Captain)			0
7	[[|]]	[[ ]]			0
8	[[|]]	[[ ]]			0
9	[[|]]	[[ ]]			0
10	[[|]]	[[ ]]			0
11	[[|]]	[[ ]]			0
12	[[|]]	[[ ]]			0
13	[[|]]	[[ ]]			0
14	[[|]]	[[ ]]			0
15	[[|]]	[[ ]]			0
16	[[|]]	[[ ]]			0
17	[[|]]	[[ ]]			0
18	[[|]]	[[ ]]			0
19	[[|]]	[[ ]]			0
20	[[|]]	[[ ]]			0
21	[[|]]	[[ ]]			0
22	[[|]]	[[ ]]			0
23	[[|]]	[[ ]]			0
