= John Glass (footballer) =

Scottish footballer

Personal information
- Full name: John Shaw Glass
- Date of birth: 5 November 1908
- Place of birth: Govan
- Date of death: 1991 (aged 82–83)
- Place of death: Eastwood
- Position: Right half

Senior career*
Years	Team	Apps	(Gls)
1929–1932	Benburb		
1932–1935	Kilmarnock	27	(5)
1936–1937	Dumbarton		
- * Club domestic league appearances and goals

John Shaw Glass (5 November 1908 – 1991) was a Scottish footballer who played for Kilmarnock and Dumbarton.
