= Jack Atkinson (English footballer) =

English footballer and manager

Personal information
- Full name: John Atkinson
- Date of birth: 20 December 1913
- Place of birth: Washington, England
- Date of death: 1977 (aged 63–64)
- Place of death: Bolton, England
- Position: Centre half

Senior career*
Years	Team	Apps	(Gls)
1931–1948	Bolton Wanderers	240	(4)
1948–1950	New Brighton	52	(0)

Managerial career
- 1948–1950: New Brighton (player-manager)
- * Club domestic league appearances and goals

John Atkinson (20 December 1913 – 1977) was an English professional footballer who played as a centre half.

== Career ==
He began his career in amateur football with Washington Colliery before signing for Football League side Bolton Wanderers in 1931. Atkinson spent 17 years with the Bolton club, making 240 league appearances and scoring 4 goals. In 1948, he was appointed player-manager of Third Division North outfit New Brighton, where he stayed for two seasons, playing a further 52 league games before leaving the club in the summer of 1950.

== Personal life ==
During the Second World War, Atkinson served with the 53rd (Bolton) Field Regiment. He took part in the invasion of Italy on 24 September 1943 as a truck driver, transporting ammunition and equipment.
