= 1922–23 West Ham United F.C. season =

English football team season

Major players brought in by manager Syd King included inside-left Billy Moore and inside-right Charlie Crossley from First Division clubs Sunderland and Everton. He also raided fellow Second Division teams, bringing in wingers Billy Charlton from South Shields and Dick Richards from Wolverhampton Wanderers.

== Season summary ==
A disastrous start to their Division Two campaign saw West Ham win just three, and lose seven of their opening 15 fixtures.

West Ham suffered their two biggest defeats of the season in consecutive away games. They lost to Blackpool 4–1 in the meeting on 21 October 1922 and a week later to Leeds United 3–1. Billy Moore scored the only West Ham goals in both games.

11 November 1922 saw West Ham face Leeds United at home and they managed to keep a clean sheet, the game ending 0-0. This game was the start of a 32-game league and cup run that would see West Ham lose only once, in their home game against Manchester United on Boxing Day.

West Ham's biggest win of the season came away to Leicester City on 15 February 1923 with the Hammers securing an emphatic 6–0 win. Billy Moore scored a hat-trick, with the other goals coming from Dick Richards, Jimmy Ruffell and Jack Tresadern.

The first fruits of this long run of good form was West Ham's presence in their first major cup final. In the first ever FA Cup Final to be held at the newly built Wembley Stadium, it is thought that a quarter of a million people converged on a ground that had the capacity for half of that, to see West Ham play Bolton Wanderers.

The match, that became known as the White Horse Final, kicked off 45 minutes late with thousands of fans standing on the touchlines. West Ham were 1-0 down within six minutes. Jack Tresadern entered the crowd to retrieve the ball and before he could return to the pitch Bolton had profited from the numerical advantage and taken the lead, with a header from David Jack. After a half-time break which had seen the players remain on the pitch, West Ham's only chance of the game came as Dick Richards swung a chest-high cross from the right wing for Vic Watson who had his shot saved and held by Bolton goalkeeper Dick Pym. Soon after, Bolton secured their victory with a goal from John Smith. There were so many bodies pressing up behind the goal that the ball instantly rebounded out and many had mistakenly thought that the ball had just hit a post. All subsequent FA Cup Finals were all-ticket.

Two days after the cup final, West Ham put their disappointment aside and travelled north to face Sheffield Wednesday. West Ham earned what was considered a "brave" 2–0 win. This put them back on top of Division Two on goal difference, with only one game left to play. West Ham's final day 1–0 loss to eventual champions Notts County was irrelevant, as fellow challengers Leicester City fell at the last hurdle, losing to Bury.

"The news of Leicester's loss was signalled from the veranda of the director's pavilion whilst a fierce struggle was going on around the Notts goal. Immediately there was a cheer, which swelled into a mighty roar as it was taken up by the crowd all around the ground. For the moment the players were confounded and the play seemed to hang in suspense, but immediately the loss of enthusiasm became apparent - it was a thrilling scene. An interesting touch was added when Donald Cock, the Notts County centre, found the opportunity on the field to shake hands with George Kay, the West Ham captain." - 'Corinthian', The Daily Graphic

Both clubs had ensured promotion, and West Ham would be appearing in the First Division for the first time in their history.

Vic Watson finished the season as top scorer with 27 goals in league and cup games. Billy Moore was the only ever-present player, finishing the season with 51 appearances.

== Squad ==
No.		Player	Position	Lge Apps	Lge Gls	FAC Apps	FAC Gls	Total Apps	Total Goals	Date signed	Previous club
West Ham United 1922-23 FA Cup Final Team
1	(England)	Ted Hufton	GK	39		9		48		1915	Sheffield United
2	(England)	Billy Henderson	RB	34		9		43		January 1922	Aberdare Athletic
3	(England)	Jack Young	LB	25		7		32		1919	Southend United
4	(England)	Sid Bishop	RH	34	2	8		42	2	1920	Ilford
5	(England)	George Kay (Captain)	CH	36		5		41		1916	Lisburn Distillery
6	(England)	Jack Tresadern	LH	37	2	9		46	2	1913	Barking
7	(Wales)	Dick Richards	OR	34	5	9	1	43	6	1922	Wolverhampton Wanderers
8	(England)	Billy Brown	IR	26	9	8	3	34	12	1921	Hetton Colliery
9	(England)	Vic Watson	CF	41	22	9	5	50	27	1920	Wellingborough Town
10	(England)	Billy Moore	IL	42	15	9	5	51	20	1922	Sunderland
11	(England)	Jimmy Ruffell	OL	33	6	9	1	42	7	1921	Wall End United
Players with 10+ appearances
8	(England)	Charlie Crossley	IR	15	1	1		16	1	1922	Everton
	(England)	George Carter	HB	10		4		14		1919	Greene & Silley Weir/RAF
	(England)	Tommy Hodgson	FB	11				11		1922	Hetton Colliery
Other players with appearances
2	(England)	Jack Hebden	RB	9				9		1920	Bradford City
	(England)	Billy Charlton	W	8				8		1922	South Shields
4	(England)	Percy Allen	RH	6		1		7		1919	Junior Amateur
	(England)	George Horler	FB	5		2		7		1922	Reading
	(England)	Jack Mackesy (Captain of reserves)	HB/F	4				4		1911	Deptford Invicta
1	(England)	Tommy Hampson	GK	3				3		1920	South Shields
	(England)	Leslie Robinson	F	3	1			3	1	1920	Stirling Athletic
	(England)	Dick Burgess	F	2				2		1922	Arsenal
	(England)	William Thirlaway	W	2				2		1921	Unsworth Colliery
	(England)	William Edwards	W	1				1		1922	Newport County
9	(England)	Bert Fletcher	CF	1				1		1923	Brentford
	(England)	Billy Williams	F	1				1		1921	Fairbairn House

== Road to Wembley ==
West Ham United's Road To Wembley

Round	Opponent	Venue	Result
1st	Hull City	A	3-2
2nd	Brighton	A	1-1
2nd R	Brighton	H	1-0
3rd	Plymouth	H	2-0
4th	Southampton	A	1-1
4th R	Southampton	H	1-0
Semi	Derby County	N	5-2
Final	Bolton	N	0-2
