= List of schools in South Tyneside =

This is a list of schools in the metropolitan Borough of South Tyneside in North East England.

== State-funded schools ==
=== Primary schools ===
- Ashley Academy, South Shields
- Bede Burn Primary School, Jarrow
- Biddick Hall Infants' School, South Shields
- Biddick Hall Junior School, South Shields
- Cleadon CE Academy, Cleadon
- Dunn Street Primary School, Jarrow
- East Boldon Infants' School, East Boldon
- East Boldon Junior School, East Boldon
- Fellgate Primary School, Jarrow
- Forest View Primary School, South Shields
- Hadrian Primary School, South Shields
- Harton Primary School, South Shields
- Hebburn Lakes Primary School, Hebburn
- Hedworth Lane Primary School, Boldon Colliery
- Hedworthfield Primary School, Jarrow
- Holy Trinity CE Academy, South Shields
- Jarrow Cross CE Primary School, Jarrow
- Laygate Community School, South Shields
- Lord Blyton Primary School, South Shields
- Marine Park Primary School, South Shields
- Marsden Primary School, Whitburn
- Monkton Academy, South Shields
- Monkton Infants' School, South Shields
- Mortimer Primary School, South Shields
- Ridgeway Primary Academy, South Shields
- St Aloysius' RC Infant School, Hebburn
- St Aloysius' RC Junior School, Hebburn
- St Bede's RC Primary School, Jarrow
- St Bede's RC Primary School, South Shields
- St Gregory's RC Primary School, South Shields
- St James RC Primary School, Hebburn
- St Joseph's RC Primary School, Jarrow
- St Mary's RC Primary School, Jarrow
- St Matthew's RC Primary School, Jarrow
- St Oswald's CE Primary School, Hebburn
- St Oswald's RC Primary School, South Shields
- Ss Peter and Paul RC Primary School, Tyne Dock
- Sea View Primary School, South Shields
- Simonside Primary School, Jarrow
- Stanhope Primary School, South Shields
- Toner Avenue Primary School, Hebburn
- Valley View Primary School, Jarrow
- West Boldon Primary School, West Boldon
- Westoe Crown Primary School, Westoe
- Whitburn Village Primary School, Whitburn

=== Secondary schools ===
- Boldon School, Boldon Colliery
- Harton Academy, South Shields
- Hebburn Comprehensive School, Hebburn
- Jarrow School, Jarrow
- Mortimer Community College, South Shields
- St Joseph's Catholic Academy, Hebburn
- St Wilfrid's RC College, South Shields
- Whitburn Church of England Academy, Whitburn

=== Special and alternative schools ===
- Bamburgh School, South Shields
- The Beacon Centre, South Shields
- Epinay Business and Enterprise School, Jarrow
- Keelman's Way School, Hebburn
- Park View School, South Shields

=== Further education ===
- South Tyneside College
