= Billy Henderson (footballer) =

English footballer

Personal information
- Full name: William Henderson
- Date of birth: 5 January 1900
- Place of birth: Whitburn, County Durham, England
- Date of death: January 1934 (aged 33–34)
- Position: Right-back

Senior career*
Years	Team	Apps	(Gls)
- Whitburn
- Brighton & Hove Albion
?–1922	Aberdare Athletic	19	(2)
1922–1928	West Ham United	162	(0)
- * Club domestic league appearances and goals

William Henderson (5 January 1900 – January 1934) was an English professional footballer. He was born in Whitburn, County Durham.

Billy Henderson, a right-back, began his career with his local side Whitburn from whom he joined Brighton & Hove Albion. He moved to Aberdare Athletic and played 19 league games in Aberdare's first ever season in the Football League (1921–22).

He left Aberdare mid-way during the season, in January 1922, to join West Ham United in a £650 transfer and was part of the West Ham team that won promotion to the First Division. He also appeared in the famous White Horse Final, the first FA Cup final to be held at the brand new Wembley Stadium, during the 1922-23 season. He was an ever-present for the Hammers during the 1923-24 season. He retired because of ill health after the 1928–29 season, having played 183 times and scored one goal, the goal being scored in the FA Cup against his old club Aberdare in 1924.

Henderson was only 34 years old when he died from tuberculosis.

== Honours ==
West Ham United

- FA Cup runner-up: 1922–23
