= Horle =

Horle is a surname. Notable people with the surname include:

- Edith Horle (1897–1962), American painter
- Lawrence C. F. Horle (1892–1950), American electrical engineer

== See also ==
- Hoerle
- Horler
