= George Carter (footballer, born 1900) =

English footballer

Personal information
- Full name: George William Carter
- Date of birth: 19 October 1900
- Place of birth: West Ham, England
- Date of death: 1981 (aged 80–81)
- Height: 5 ft 8 in (1.73 m)
- Position: Half-back

Senior career*
Years	Team	Apps	(Gls)
- Green & Silley Weir
1919–1927	West Ham United	136	(1)
1927–1928	Fulham	0	(0)
- Grays Thurrock
- * Club domestic league appearances and goals

George William Carter (19 October 1900 – 1981) was an English footballer who played as a half-back in the Football League for West Ham United.

Born in West Ham, Essex, Carter played for West Ham Boys, then his works team, Green & Silley Weir of the London Munitions League, before moving to West Ham United for the club's first season of League football in 1919–20.

Often used as understudy to Sid Bishop, George Kay or Jack Tresadern, Carter managed 136 League appearances for the Irons. His only goal came in a 2–1 win against Leeds United on 29 January 1921. He also played 19 FA Cup games for the club.

Carter never fully recovered from a knee injury sustained during a game against Blackburn Rovers on 14 February 1927. After a cartilage operation, he signed on for the following season but did not play. He had a brief stint at Fulham in 1928 and later played for Grays Thurrock.

Carter went on to work for local company Tate & Lyle, and continued his association with the game as a coach with them. He also organised the West Ham six-a-side tournament.
