= Billy Brown (footballer, born 1900) =

English footballer (1900–1985)

Personal information
- Full name: William Brown
- Date of birth: 22 August 1900
- Place of birth: Hetton-le-Hole, England
- Date of death: 7 January 1985 (aged 84)
- Place of death: Easington, England
- Height: 5 ft 7 1/2 in (1.71 m)

Senior career*
Years	Team	Apps	(Gls)
- Hetton
1921–1924	West Ham United	60	(15)
1924–1929	Chelsea	54	(20)
1929–1930	Fulham	2	(0)
1930–1931	Stockport County	4	(0)
1931–1932	Hartlepools United	13	(3)
- Annfield Plain
- Blackhall Colliery Welfare

International career
1923	England	1	(1)
- * Club domestic league appearances and goals

William Brown (22 August 1900 – 7 January 1985) was an English professional footballer who played in the Football League for West Ham United, Chelsea, Fulham, Stockport County and Hartlepools United.

== Career ==
Brown joined West Ham United, a club he had played for as a 16-year-old during World War I, from Hetton in 1921. He made his debut in the final match of the 1920–21 season, a scoreless away game against South Shields on 7 May 1921.

Brown was often used as a Utility player, but predominantly featured in the inside-forward positions during his Football League career. He played at inside-right, partnering Dick Richards, in the 1923 FA Cup Final against Bolton Wanderers. A month later, he played for England in a reserve international against France. He gained a full cap the following year, scoring in a 2–2 draw against Belgium at The Hawthorns that saw him playing alongside West Ham teammate Ted Hufton.

He made 71 appearances and scored 21 goals for the east London club before leaving for Chelsea in 1924. He went on to play for Fulham, Stockport County and Hartlepools United, where he scored 3 goals in 13 appearances. He saw out his playing days with spells at Annfield Plain and Blackhall Colliery Welfare. He also played cricket for Blackhall, signing on 14 March 1933 and becoming captain of the team. He ended his time with the club when he took on a role as a colliery baths superintendent at Easington Colliery.

== Honours ==
West Ham United

- FA Cup runner-up: 1922–23
