= Jack Young (footballer, born 1895) =

English footballer

Personal information
- Full name: John Young
- Date of birth: 1895
- Place of birth: Whitburn, Tyne and Wear, England
- Date of death: 1952 (aged 56–57)
- Positions: Defender; winger

Senior career*
Years	Team	Apps	(Gls)
- Whitburn Villa
- South Shields
–1922	Southend United		
1919–1926	West Ham United	124	(3)
1926–1929	Queens Park Rangers	89	(12)
1929–1930	Accrington Stanley	4	(0)
- * Club domestic league appearances and goals

John Young (1895–1952) was an English footballer who played as a defender and left winger for Southend United, West Ham United, Queens Park Rangers and Accrington Stanley.

West Ham signed him for £600 from Southend in 1919, and he played for the club 138 times, scoring 3 goals.

He was part of the West Ham team that won promotion to the First Division and also appeared in the White Horse Final, the first FA Cup final to be held at the brand new Wembley Stadium, during the 1922–23 season.

He joined Queens Park Rangers in 1926 and moved to Stanley in 1929.

== Honours ==
West Ham United

- FA Cup runner-up: 1922–23
