= Billy Moore (footballer, born 1894) =

English footballer

Personal information
- Full name: William Gray Bruce Moore
- Date of birth: 6 October 1894
- Place of birth: Newcastle-upon-Tyne, England
- Date of death: 26 September 1968 (aged 73)
- Height: 5 ft 6 1/2 in (1.69 m)
- Position: Inside forward

Senior career*
Years	Team	Apps	(Gls)
- Seaton Delaval
1913–1922	Sunderland	46	(11)
1922–1929	West Ham United	181	(42)

International career
1914	England Amateurs	3	(4)
1923	England	1	(2)
- * Club domestic league appearances and goals

William Gray Bruce Moore (6 October 1894 – 26 September 1968) was an English footballer who played as an inside-left in the Football League for Sunderland and West Ham United.

== Playing career ==
Moore was born in Newcastle upon Tyne and played for Sunderland, where he partnered Henry Martin on the left, having previously played for Seaton Delaval.

Moore played for West Ham United between 1922 and 1929. He was an ever-present in the side that won promotion back to Division One in 1922–23, and played in the famous White Horse Final of 1923. He received full international recognition with his first cap for the English main team against Sweden on 24 May 1923, scoring twice in a 3–1 victory. Previously he had already played three matches for the England Amateurs against Belgium, Denmark and Sweden, all of which prior to the war, having netted four goals.

Moore stayed at West Ham to become assistant trainer after his playing career ended in 1929. He was promoted in 1932, and stayed at the club as trainer-in-chief until his retirement in 1960.

== Career statistics ==
=== Goals for England ===
England score listed first, score column indicates score after each Moore goal.

List of international goals scored by Billy Moore
No.	Cap	Date	Venue	Opponent	Score	Result	Competition	Ref
1	1	13 March 1911	Råsunda, Solna, Sweden	Sweden	1–0	3–1	Friendly	
2	1	13 March 1911	Råsunda, Solna, Sweden	Sweden	3–1	3–1	Friendly	

=== Goals for England Amateurs ===
England Amateurs score listed first, score column indicates score after each Moore goal.

List of international goals scored by Billy Moore
No.	Cap	Date	Venue	Opponent	Score	Result	Competition	Ref
1	1	24 February 1914	Stade du Vivier d'Oie, Bruxelles, Belgium	Belgium	?	8–1	Friendly	
2	1	24 February 1914	Stade du Vivier d'Oie, Bruxelles, Belgium	Belgium	?	8–1	Friendly	
3	3	10 June 1914	Råsunda IP, Solna, Sweden	Sweden	1–0	5–1	Friendly	
4	3	10 June 1914	Råsunda IP, Solna, Sweden	Sweden	4–0	5–1	Friendly	

== Honours ==
West Ham United

- FA Cup runner-up: 1922–23
