= George Scorey =

British police officer

George Albert Scorey
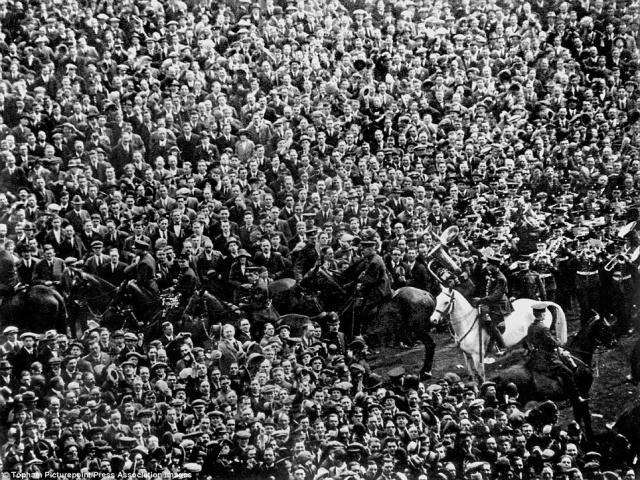
- George Scorey on Billy at the 1923 FA Cup Final.
- Born: 30 December 1882; Bristol, England
- Died: 14 April 1965 (aged 82); Greenwich, England
- Occupation: Policeman
- Children: 2

George Albert Scorey (30 December 1882 – 14 April 1965) was an English soldier and later policeman. He is best known as the rider of the white horse at the 1923 FA Cup Final, played between Bolton Wanderers and West Ham United on 28 April 1923, the first FA Cup final to be played at the original Wembley Stadium, which became known as the "White Horse Final".

== Early life and army career ==
Scorey was born in Bristol. His father, a shipping clerk and labourer, died in 1887. His mother worked as a charwoman before remarrying in 1903.

Scorey enlisted in the British Army in August 1898, joining the 2nd Dragoons (Royal Scots Greys). He served as a trumpeter in the Second Anglo-Boer War (1899–1902), and remained in South Africa until 1905 as part of the colonial garrison. He was an escort when Tsar Nicholas II and other members of the Russian Royal Family visited England in 1909. Scorey was promoted to the rank of sergeant and trumpet major shortly before his 11-year term of enlistment ended, and he re-enlisted in December 1909.

Scorey accompanied his regiment to France as part of the 5th Cavalry Brigade in the British Expeditionary Force when the First World War broke out in 1914. He served in the Battle of Mons and the First Battle of Ypres in 1914, the Second Battle of Ypres in 1915, and the Battle of Arras in 1917. He remained in France and Belgium until August 1918. He finally left the British Army at the end of August 1919, after completing 21 years of service.

== Police career ==
Although he was shorter than the required minimum height of 5'8", Scorey was invited to join the Metropolitan Police by Deputy Assistant Commissioner Percy Laurie, who was in charge of the force's Mounted Branch. Laurie was formerly regimental adjutant in the Scots Greys, and offered positions to many of his former comrades. Scorey became a police constable in November 1919, and was quickly allocated to the mounted branch. He was issued horse no. 62, a seven-year-old grey named Billy (or Billie), in June 1920.

== 1923 FA Cup Final ==
The 1923 FA Cup Final, which was the first played at Wembley Stadium, was contested by Bolton Wanderers and West Ham United. There were almost 600 police officers and stewards on duty to supervise the event, with a crowd of around 100,000 expected. Scorey was part of the 200-strong reserve of police officers based at Wembley Park Road. The crowd easily numbered over 200,000, vastly exceeded expectations and the stadium's 125,000 capacity, with some estimates of the attendance reaching 300,000. The crush forced thousands of spectators out of the stands and on to the pitch before the scheduled 3pm kick-off.

Scorey, with nine other mounted police officers and the others on foot, were called in to control the crowd and clear the pitch. The encroaching spectators were slowly edged back behind the touchlines. The match eventually began 45 minutes late, after King George V had been escorted to the royal box.

Billy, the only grey horse present, was prominent in black-and-white news photographs and newsreels, and the match became known as the "White Horse Final". Scorey and Billy – described as an "officer on a white charger" – was singled out for attention in press coverage. The Football Association gave him tickets to each subsequent FA Cup Final, but he had little interest in football and did not attend.

== Private and later life ==
Scorey had married in Edinburgh in December 1909. The couple lived in York, but their son was born in Edinburgh in June 1912. A second son was born in April 1915. Both sons were raised by Scorey's mother-in-law after his wife died of tuberculosis in November 1915. Scorey remarried in Chislehurst in September 1922.

After the 1923 FA Cup Final, Scorey declined invitations to appear in public, and he resumed normal duties with Billy. He was a trumpeter in the Metropolitan Police band, and he performed at horse shows. He won the King's Cup at the Royal Tournament at Olympia in 1928. Billy died in December 1930, and Laurie presented Scorey with an inkwell made from one of Billy's hooves mounted with silver, which is now held by the Metropolitan Police mounted branch museum at Imber Court, Surrey.

Declining eyesight forced Scorey to retire in 1939, and he received an ill-health pension. He and his second wife retired to Hove in Sussex and then returned to Chislehurst. He died from bronchial pneumonia at Brook Hospital in Greenwich. His elder son had died in 1929, but he was survived by his wife and younger son from his first marriage.
