= Dick Richards (footballer) =

Welsh footballer (1890–1934)

Personal information
- Full name: Richard William Richards
- Date of birth: 14 February 1890
- Place of birth: Glyn Ceiriog, Wales
- Date of death: 29 January 1934 (aged 43)
- Height: 5 ft 8 1/2 in (1.74 m)
- Position: Forward

Senior career*
Years	Team	Apps	(Gls)
- Bronygarth
- Chirk
- Oswestry United
1913–1922	Wolverhampton Wanderers	88	(22)
1922–1924	West Ham United	43	(5)
1924–1925	Fulham	21	(2)
- Mold
1927–1928	Colwyn Bay United		

International career
1920–1925	Wales	9	(1)
- * Club domestic league appearances and goals

Richard William Richards (14 February 1890 – 29 January 1934) was a Welsh footballer who played in various forward positions in the Football League for Wolverhampton Wanderers, West Ham United and Fulham, and internationally for Wales.

== Career ==
Richards was born in Glyn Ceiriog (Note: According to most of the listed sources, although Who's Who of West Ham United gives his birthplace as Chirk) and played non-league football for Bronygarth, Chirk and Oswestry United before moving to Wolverhampton Wanderers.

During his time at Wolves, Richards played 88 League games either side of World War I, scoring 22 goals. He gained five caps for Wales while with the club, scoring in a 2–1 win against England during the 1919–20 British Home Championship.

He joined West Ham United in 1922 for a fee of £300. Initially joining as an outside-left, he was moved to the opposite flank to accommodate Jimmy Ruffell. The 1922–23 season saw Richards make 34 Second Division appearances. He also made 10 cup appearances for the club, including the 1923 FA Cup Final loss to Bolton Wanderers. The following season, after promotion to the First Division, Richards made a further ten appearances, including a single FA Cup appearance that saw the Hammers bow out of the competition to Second Division Leeds United. Richards picked up more international caps, playing at inside-left, at the 1923–24 British Home Championship, which saw victories for Wales against all three other teams.

In 1924, after 53 appearances for West Ham, Richards left for Fulham. He made 24 appearances for the west London club, scoring twice, but his time there was hampered by injury. He went on to play for Welsh teams, Mold, (Note: Sources vary as to whether the club was named Mold F.C. or Mold Town F.C.) where he gained the last of 9 caps, and Colwyn Bay United, where he finished his career. He then went to work for an electricity company in Cheshire. During this time, he sustained a back injury which led to his death, at the age of 42.

== Honours ==
West Ham United

- FA Cup runner-up: 1922–23
