= Dave Clelland =

Scottish footballer (1924–2004)

Personal information
- Full name: David Clelland
- Date of birth: 18 March 1924
- Place of birth: Netherburn, Scotland
- Date of death: 8 June 2004 (aged 80)
- Place of death: Whitburn, England
- Height: 6 ft 0 in (1.83 m)
- Position: Outside right

Senior career*
Years	Team	Apps	(Gls)
1946–1948	Arsenal	0	(0)
1948–1949	Brighton & Hove Albion	8	(1)
1949	Ipswich Town	0	(0)
1949	Crystal Palace	2	(0)
1949–1950	Weymouth		
1950–1951	Scunthorpe United	16	(8)
- * Club domestic league appearances and goals

David Clelland (18 March 1924 – 8 June 2004) was a Scottish professional footballer who played as an outside right in the Football League for Brighton & Hove Albion, Crystal Palace and Scunthorpe United. He was on the books of Arsenal and Ipswich Town without playing for their first team, and scored 11 goals from 26 appearances in all competitions for Southern League club Weymouth.

After retiring from football in 1951, Clelland served in the Metropolitan Police. He died in Whitburn, Tyne and Wear in 2004 at the age of 80.
