= Percy Allen (footballer) =

English footballer

Personal information
- Full name: Percy William Allen
- Date of birth: 2 July 1895
- Place of birth: West Ham, England
- Date of death: 21 October 1969 (aged 74)
- Height: 5 ft 9 in (1.75 m)
- Position: Right half

Senior career*
Years	Team	Apps	(Gls)
1919–1923	West Ham United	80	(5)
1923–1925	Lincoln City	59	(4)
1925–1927	Northampton Town	44	(4)
- Weymouth
- Peterborough & Fletton United
- Stamford Town
- * Club domestic league appearances and goals

Percy William Allen (2 July 1895 – 21 October 1969) was an English professional footballer who played predominantly as a right half. He was born in West Ham, Essex.

A Lieutenant, Allen served in the British Army during World War I, and played as an amateur before moving to West Ham United for the club's initial Division Two season. Having played for the club three times in the London Combination between December 1917 and October 1918, he made his full debut in a 2–1 home defeat to Birmingham on 1 November 1919, at outside-right. He was also played at centre-forward, but became an ever-present at right-half during the 1921–22 season. Allen lost his place in the team to Sid Bishop due to the reappearance of a blood ailment which he had suffered from during his time in the Army.

Allen made 86 league and cup appearances for the Irons, scoring 5 goals. He played his final competitive game for the club on 17 February 1923, against Barnsley. He was part of the group that travelled to Austria and Hungary in May 1923, but did not feature.

Allen was transferred to Lincoln City in January 1924. After 61 appearances for the Imps, he joined Northampton Town in the summer of 1925, leaving them at the end of the 1926–27 season. He later played for Weymouth, Peterborough & Fletton United and Stamford Town.

After retirement, Allen went on to work for West Ham Corporation, and later owned a newsagents in East Ham.
