= Charlie Crossley =

English footballer

Personal information
- Full name: Charles Arthur Crossley
- Date of birth: 17 December 1891
- Place of birth: Short Heath, England
- Date of death: 29 April 1965 (aged 73)
- Place of death: Wolverhampton, England
- Height: 5 ft 7 in (1.70 m)
- Position: Inside forward

Senior career*
Years	Team	Apps	(Gls)
1909–1910	Short Heath United		
1910–1911	Willenhall Swifts		
1911	Siemens Institute		
1911–1912	Willenhall Swifts		
1912–1913	Hednesford Town		
1913–1914	Walsall		
1914–1920	Sunderland	43	(17)
1920–1922	Everton	50	(18)
1922–1923	West Ham United	15	(1)
1923–1925	Swindon Town	38	(12)
1925–19??	Ebbw Vale		

Managerial career
- 1925–19??: Ebbw Vale
- * Club domestic league appearances and goals

Charles Arthur Crossley (17 December 1891 – 29 April 1965) was an English professional footballer who played as an inside forward in the Football League for Everton, Sunderland, Swindon Town and West Ham United. He later player-managed Ebbw Vale in non-league football.

== Personal life ==
Crossley served as a stoker on a Royal Navy submarine during the First World War.

== Career statistics ==
Appearances and goals by club, season and competition
Club	Season	League			FA Cup		Other		Total	
Club	Season	Division	Apps	Goals	Apps	Goals	Apps	Goals	Apps	Goals
Sunderland	1913–14	First Division	5	2	0	0	0	0	5	2
Sunderland	1914–15	First Division	14	6	0	0	1 (Note: Appearance in Newcastle & Hospitals Cup)	0	15	6
Sunderland	1919–20	First Division	24	9	3	0	0	0	27	9
Sunderland	Total		43	17	3	0	1	0	47	17
Everton	1920–21	First Division	35	15	5	3	―		40	18
Everton	1921–22	First Division	15	3	0	0	―		15	3
Everton	Total		50	18	5	3	―		55	21
West Ham United	1922–23	Second Division	15	1	1	0	―		16	1
Swindon Town	1923–24	Third Division South	26	8	5	2	―		31	10
Swindon Town	1924–25	Third Division South	12	4	1	0	―		13	4
Swindon Town	Total		38	12	6	2	―		44	14
Career total			146	48	15	5	1	0	162	63

== Honours ==
West Ham United

- Football League Second Division second-place promotion: 1922–23
