= Hoerle =

Hoerle is a German surname. Notable people with the surname include:

- Angelika Hoerle (1899–1923), German artist
- Heinrich Hoerle (1895–1936), German artist

== See also ==
- Horle
