= Horler =

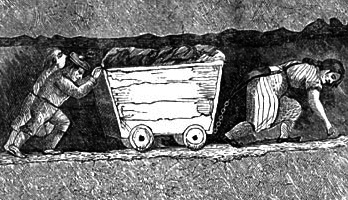
- Haulers transporting coal
- Language: English

Origin
- Meaning: From "hauler" Literally "dragger"
- Region of origin: Somerset, England

Horler is an uncommon family name that originated in Somerset, England. Its earliest appearance was around 1600 as an occupational name for coal transporters, or "haulers".

== People with the surname "Horler" ==
- David Horler (born 1943), English jazz trombonist
- Ed Horler (born 1995), English field hockey player
- Edd Horler (born 1963), British bobsledder
- George Horler (1895–1967), English footballer
- John Horler (born 1947), English jazz pianist
- Natalie Horler (born 1981), English-German singer and television presenter
- Sacha Horler (born 1970), Australian actress
- Sydney Horler (1888–1954), British novelist
