= Whitburn, Tyne and Wear =

Village in South Tyneside, England

Coordinates: 54.952°N 1.365°W

Whitburn
- Village
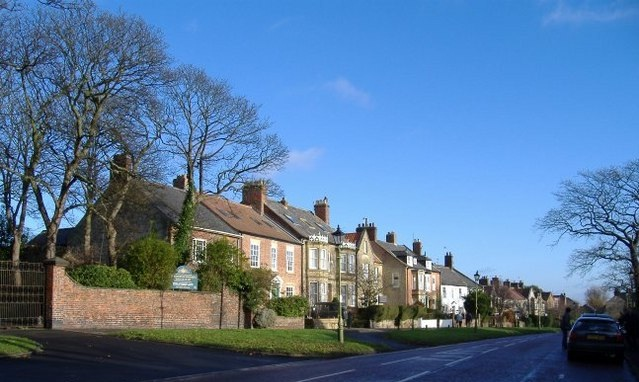
- Houses on Front Street, Whitburn

- Location within Tyne and Wear
- Population: 7,448 (Note: 2011. South Tyneside ward of Whitburn and Marsden)
- OS grid reference: NZ 40798 61943
- Metropolitan borough: South Tyneside
- Metropolitan county: Tyne and Wear
- Region: North East
- Country: England
- Sovereign state: United Kingdom
- Post town: SUNDERLAND
- Postcode district: SR6
- Dialling code: 0191
- Police: Northumbria
- Fire: Tyne and Wear
- Ambulance: North East
- UK Parliament: South Shields

Whitburn is a village in South Tyneside, in the metropolitan county of Tyne and Wear on the coast of North East England. It is located 3 miles (4.8 km) north of the city of Sunderland and 4 miles (6.4 km) south of the town of South Shields. Historically, Whitburn is part of County Durham. Other nearby population centres include Seaburn, Cleadon and Marsden. The village lies on a south-facing slope, part of Durham's Magnesian Limestone plateau, which overlooks Sunderland. The population for the combined Whitburn and Marsden Ward in the 2011 UK Census was 7,448. For much of its history, Whitburn was a fishing and agricultural community. The village contains three schools, three churches, a cricket club, recreational grounds, a pub and a variety of shops.

== Toponymy ==
The first written instance of Whitburn is in the Boldon Book of 1183, where the village is recorded as Whitberne. This name may refer to a stream or burn running through the village. Alternatively, the origin could come from Hwita Byrgen, or Hwita's tumulus, the place where the Saxon nobleman Hwita was buried. Other possible origins are Kwit-Berne, an Anglo-Saxon word for a tithe barn, or hwīt + bere-ærn, Old English for "white barn".

== History ==
The earliest evidence of human occupation in Whitburn dates back to the Mesolithic period (8,000–4,500BC). Lumps of burnt daub have been discovered at Potter's Hole on the coast, probably from a timber structure. Archaeological deposits and Mesolithic flint scatters have been found at nearby sites, including St Peter's Church, Monkwearmouth. Neolithic and Bronze Age flints have also been found in Whitburn. A Bronze Age cist burial was uncovered in Wheatall Farm in 1929 which contained a 35-year-old person buried with an arrowhead, flints and limpets.

When the bishopric of Monkwearmouth was founded in 674, the king gifted all of the royal estates east of Dere Street and north of the River Wear – which included Whitburn – to the Church. Cuthbert, the Bishop of Lindisfarne at the time, was responsible for spreading Christianity throughout the North East. Whitburn was located within an important centre of European learning and culture at this time, being situated between the monasteries of Jarrow and Monkwearmouth.

Part of the village to the south has been designated as an Area of Potential Archaeological Importance as it is the site of a medieval village. During the Middle Ages, Whitburn was both a township and a parish. Whitburn Parish included the townships of Whitburn and Cleadon. By the 12th century, Whitburn appears to have been well-established as a two row green village (two rows of properties facing onto a linear green). Whitburn had a tithe barn, a stone building which formed part of the village's feudal system, situated off Church Lane until it was destroyed by a bomb in the Second World War. Whitburn Parish Church (constructed in the 13th century) and Whitburn Hall (constructed in the 16th century) became the focal points of the village.

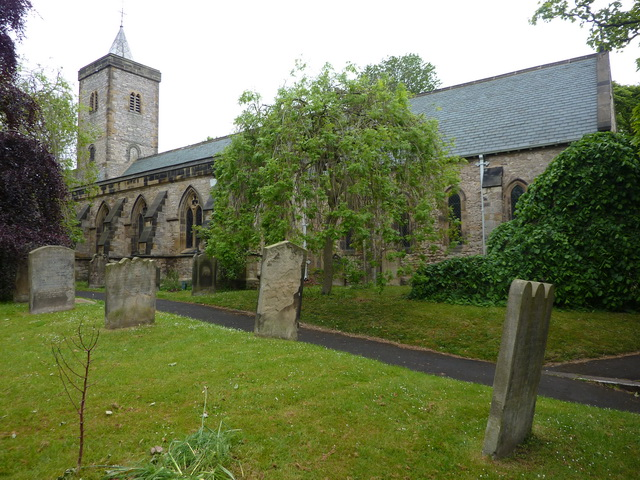
Whitburn Parish Church, the oldest surviving building in the village, was constructed in the 13th century.

Whitburn is recorded in the Boldon Book of 1183 as Whitberne and was listed alongside Cleadon. The combined land area of Cleadon and Whitburn was approximately 3,309 acres (5.2 sq mi), suggesting that the settlements were well-established by the time of the Boldon Book. The entry in the Boldon Book mentions a "John of Whitburn" who "holds 40 acres and 1 toft and returns 8s and goes on missions for the Bishop." The use of the word "cornage", an old form of taxation pre-dating the Anglo-Saxon period, further suggests that Whitburn was among the oldest of settlements in the area. In 1183, Whitburn and Boldon formed part of the bishop's estates and much of the surrounding land belonged to the Prior of Durham Cathedral. 200 years after the Boldon Book, the Bishop of Durham (Thomas Hatfield) commissioned the Hatfield Survey. Cleadon and Whitburn are again listed together as a single parish with two townships. The survey also mentions Whitburn Windmill.

Whitburn operated under a manorial system until 1718 when the Land Enclosure Act came into force and a number of farms were created. Until the mid-late 19th century, Whitburn was a largely agricultural and fishing community. Throughout the 19th century, the population of Whitburn Parish grew from 675 in 1801 to 2,738 in 1891, largely driven by increased industrialisation. A contemporary description from 1834 describes the villages as having "a more sheltered and comfortable appearance than most places on the bare-eastern coast." Another description of the village from 1857 records it as having "a Wesleyan Methodist chapel, a post-office, a brewery, and three public houses." The 1891 census reveals that Whitburn's population included wealthy industrialists, entrepreneurs, coalminers and fishermen. Detached villas and terraces were built along with two schools and the Wesleyan Chapel, which was replaced by the current Methodist Church in 1881. Whitburn Colliery (also known as Marsden Colliery) opened in the 1840s, stimulating the local brick and iron industries and fulfilling the growing demand for coal. By 1931, Whitburn Colliery produced over 18,000 tons of coal per week, serving the surrounding Marsden pit village. It closed on 1 June 1968 and the village was demolished.

In 1931 the parish of Whitburn had a population of 6,082. On 1 April 1936 the parish was abolished with most of the area, including the village itself, becoming part of Boldon Urban District and a smaller part going to South Shields. Boldon Urban District was abolished in 1974 when the area was transferred from County Durham to Tyne and Wear. No successor parish was created for the former urban district and so it became an unparished area.

Lewis Carroll visited his cousin Margaret Wilcox while she lived in Whitburn, along with Lady Hedworth Williamson of Whitburn Hall (second cousin of Alice Liddell). It is popularly believed that Carroll wrote The Walrus and the Carpenter while holidaying in Whitburn.

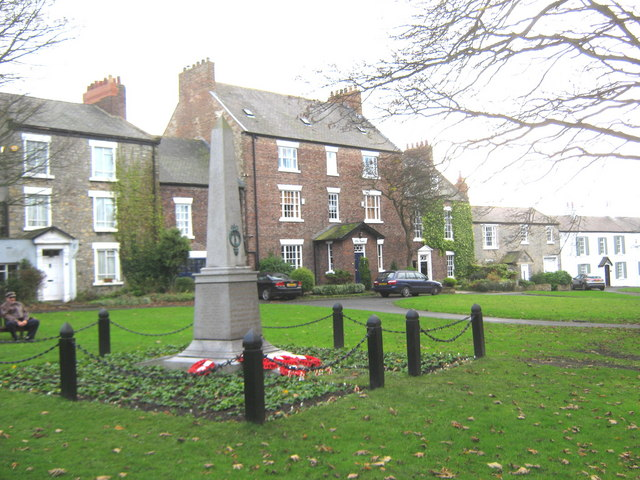
Whitburn War Memorial, located on the village green.

During the First World War, Whitburn had primary shore and cliff defences. The stretch of east coastline from Sunderland to Whitburn was established by the 3rd Battalion of the Cheshire Regiment, and the stretch from Whitburn to the Tyne was established by the 3rd Battalion of the Durham Light Infantry. In 1918, the War Office report recorded a training ground at Marsden Farm in Whitburn. Prefabricated hutment camps were also recorded in West Hall and South Bents Farm in Whitburn. Two rifle ranges from the time are still visible today in the village. In 1921, a war memorial was erected on the village green.

During the Second World War, the coastline at Whitburn often came under attack from German bombing raids. On one occasion on 9 August 1940, a Heinkel He 111H-E crashed into the sea after dropping bombs on Sunderland. The German airmen all survived and were rescued from the water. The cottages at Whitburn Bents were also badly damaged during heavy bombing in 1940. Whitburn had a few wartime defences. A bombing decoy, known as a starfish site, was built at Wellands Farm near Whitburn. It was designed to look like a city on fire in order to confuse bombers travelling to the Tyne and Sunderland docks. A heavy anti-aircraft battery was installed at Lizard Lane in 1940, and Whitburn windmill was used by observer corps as an observation post to warn of oncoming enemies at sea.

Throughout the 20th century, there was much residential development in Whitburn largely to the north and east of the village's historic core. This led to the village's function as a commuter settlement.

== Demography ==
Whitburn and Marsden Ward compared (2011)
	Whitburn and Marsden Ward	South Tyneside	England
Total population	7,448	148,127	53,012,456
White	97.9%	95.9%	85.4%
BME	2.1%	4.1%	14.6%
Aged 0–19	21.5%	22.6%	24%
Aged 65+	21.9%	18.1%	16.4%
Male	47.7%	48.3%	49.2%
Female	52.3%	51.7%	50.8%

At the time of the 2001 UK Census, Whitburn had a population of 5,235. In the 2011 UK Census, the Whitburn and Marsden Ward had 7,448 usual residents. The average age of the residents was 43.6, slightly above the average for South Tyneside. The vast majority (97.9%) of residents identified as white and 97.5% were born in the UK. The largest religious group was Christianity (75.2% of residents). The majority of residents (58.2%) were in employment, with wholesale and retail trade and health and social work activities being the most common industries for the area. The most common occupation was 'Professional' (16.2%).

== Governance ==
In the UK national parliament, Whitburn is part of the South Shields constituency. Until the 2010 UK General Election, Whitburn was part of the Jarrow constituency. Boundary changes caused the village to move into the South Shields constituency prior to the election. As of 2022, Emma Lewell-Buck (Labour) his the local MP and has been since May 2013. In the 2019 General Election, Lewell-Buck won with a 9,585 vote majority. As of 2022, the ward of Whitburn and Marsden is represented by local councillors Peter Boyack, Tracey Dixon, and Joyce Welsh (all Labour).

== Features ==
Whitburn has retained its village character, with its main street, parish church, cricket ground and park with bowling greens and tennis courts. The street plan of the medieval core of the village largely remains today and can be seen in the layout of Front Street.

Map of key features in Whitburn

=== Whitburn windmill ===
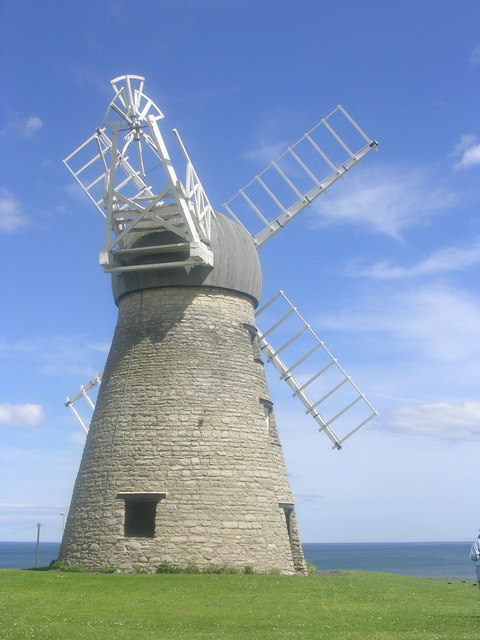
Whitburn windmill, looking out to sea.

Whitburn windmill, dating from the 18th century, is a Grade II listed building and a local landmark. It is located to the north of the village. It is the oldest surviving of local stone tower mills. The original windmill was a wooden post mill which is recorded in a 1779 coastal shipping survey. The original mill blew down in a storm and was replaced by the current limestone magnesian structure in around 1796. The windmill would have ground corn from local farms which was then used to make bread. Towards the end of the 19th century, however, steam-powered mills grew in prominence and Whitburn mill eventually ceased operation in 1896. South Tyneside Council took over ownership of the windmill in 1960, and in 1991–1992, they undertook a restoration project of the mill for which it was awarded the Civic Trust Award.

=== Whitburn Bents ===
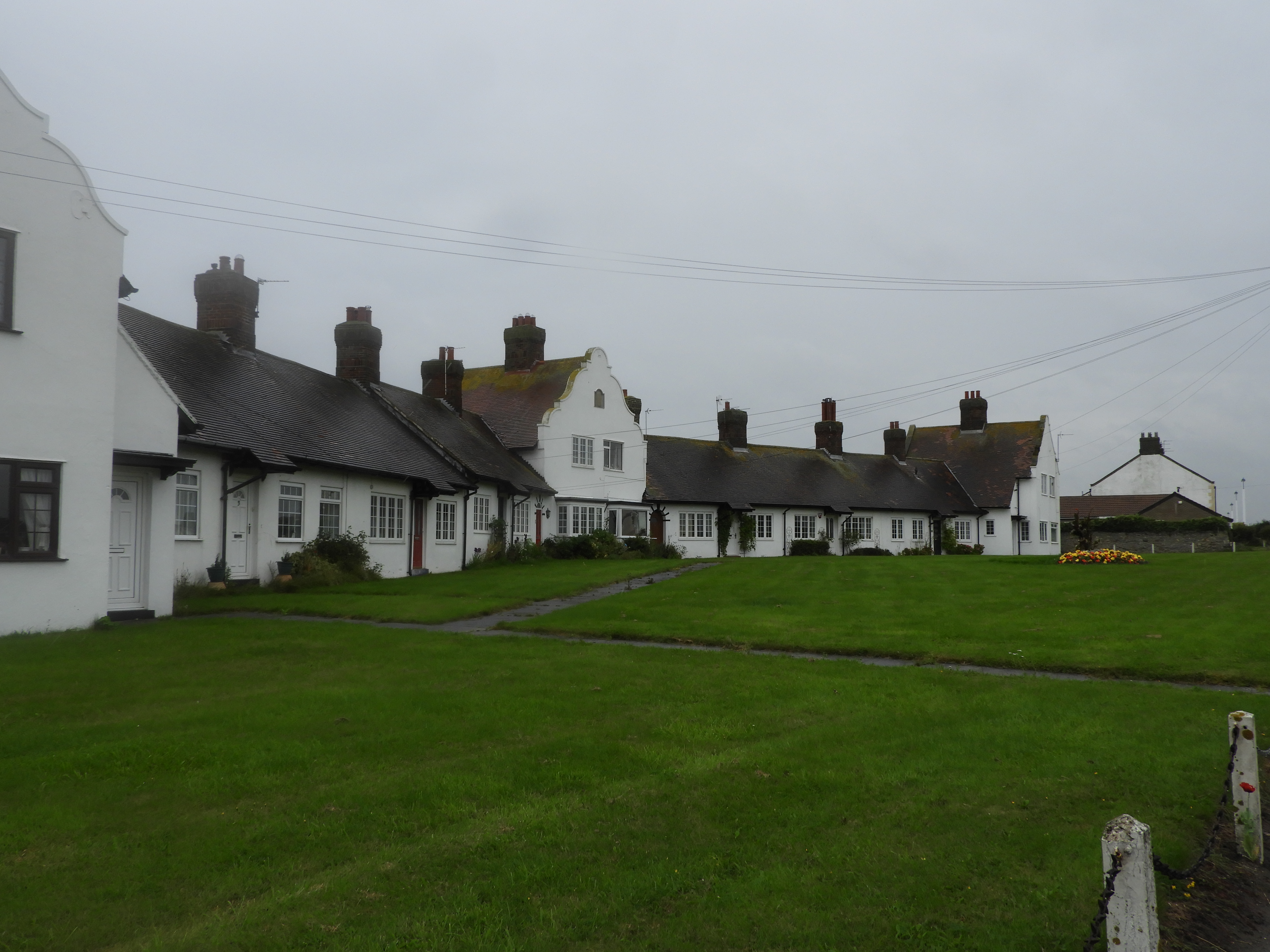
Cottages at Whitburn Bents.

Whitburn Bents is an area located on the coastline to the south of the village. It features a small arch of early 20th century cottages on the site of a former fisherman's cottage and an 18th-century farmstead. The land was formerly a fishing hamlet. The name "Bents" is derived from the coarse grass (agrostis, or bentgrass) that can be found in the local coastal area. Whitburn Bents and Whitburn Village were historically recognised as two separate communities, largely due to the difference in the inhabitants' occupations; by the 19th century, Bents was a farming and fishing community, whereas residents of Whitburn Village had a more diverse range of occupations including industrialists and coalminers. In 1938, Sir Hedworth Williamson demolished the cottages at Bents and rebuilt them in a manner which resembles their current crescent form. These buildings were badly damaged by bombing during the Second World War. After the Second World War, the cottages were rebuilt with their original design largely retained.

South Bents Farm, originally established in the 18th century, remained in use until the 1960s. South Bents Farmhouse, located to the south of the concave of cottages, is a Grade II listed building. Much of the evidence of early farming activities has been lost due to modern developments,

=== Whitburn Coastal Park ===
To the north of the village, near Marsden village, is Whitburn Coastal Park. It is situated on the site of the former Whitburn Colliery and consists of a range of grassland, woodland and scrub habitats. It is cared for by the National Trust. The area was designated as a Local Nature Reserve in 2003. This recreation area is a popular haunt for birdwatchers. The coastline from Trow Point to Whitburn is an International and European Wildlife Site. The birds that visit each winter arrive in internationally significant numbers, including purple sandpiper and turnstone which arrive from Scandinavia. Sanderling, ringed plover and redshank also appear on the coastline here in nationally significant numbers. Seals and dolphins have also been spotted on the coastline.

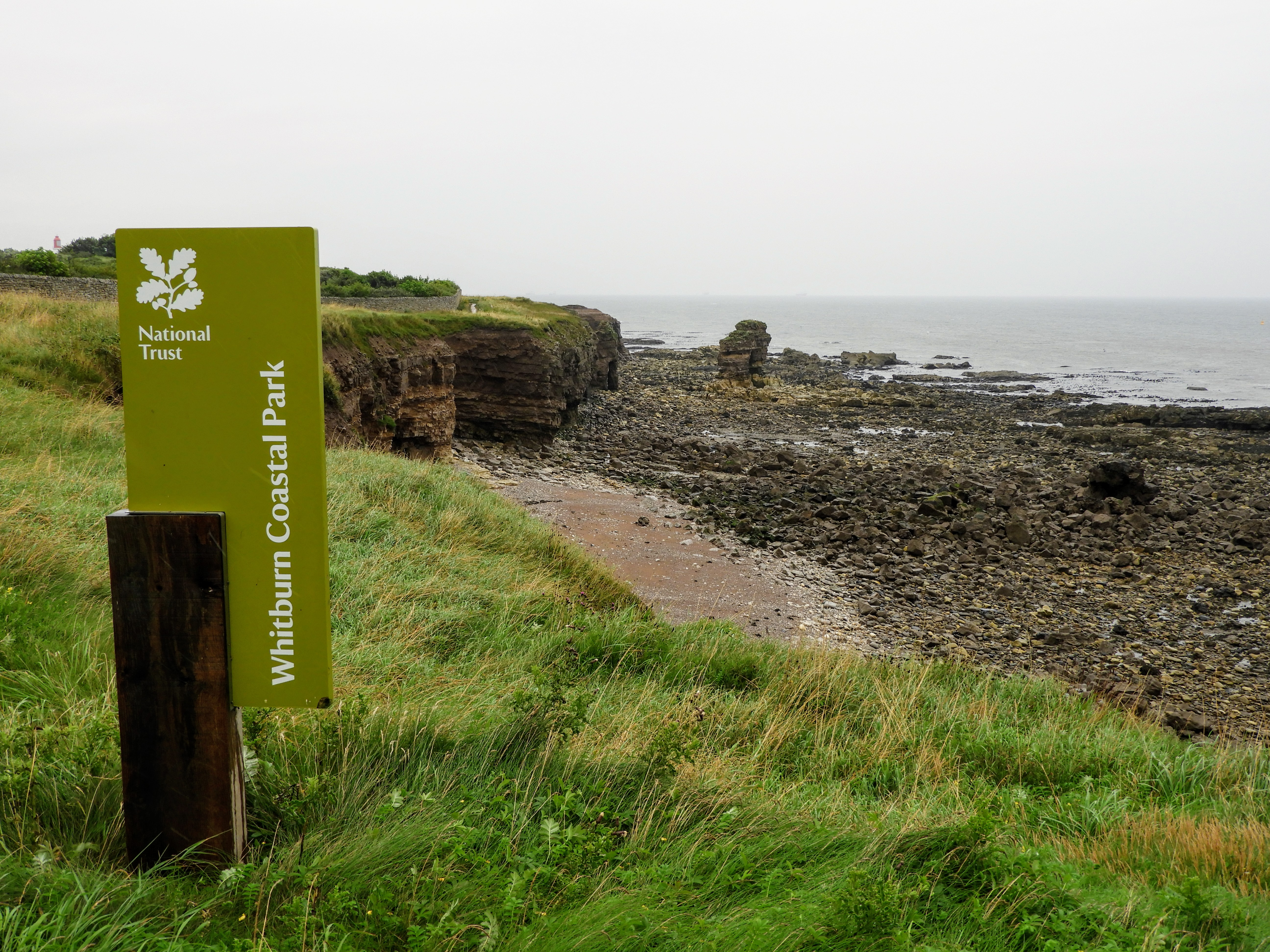
Whitburn Coastal Park.

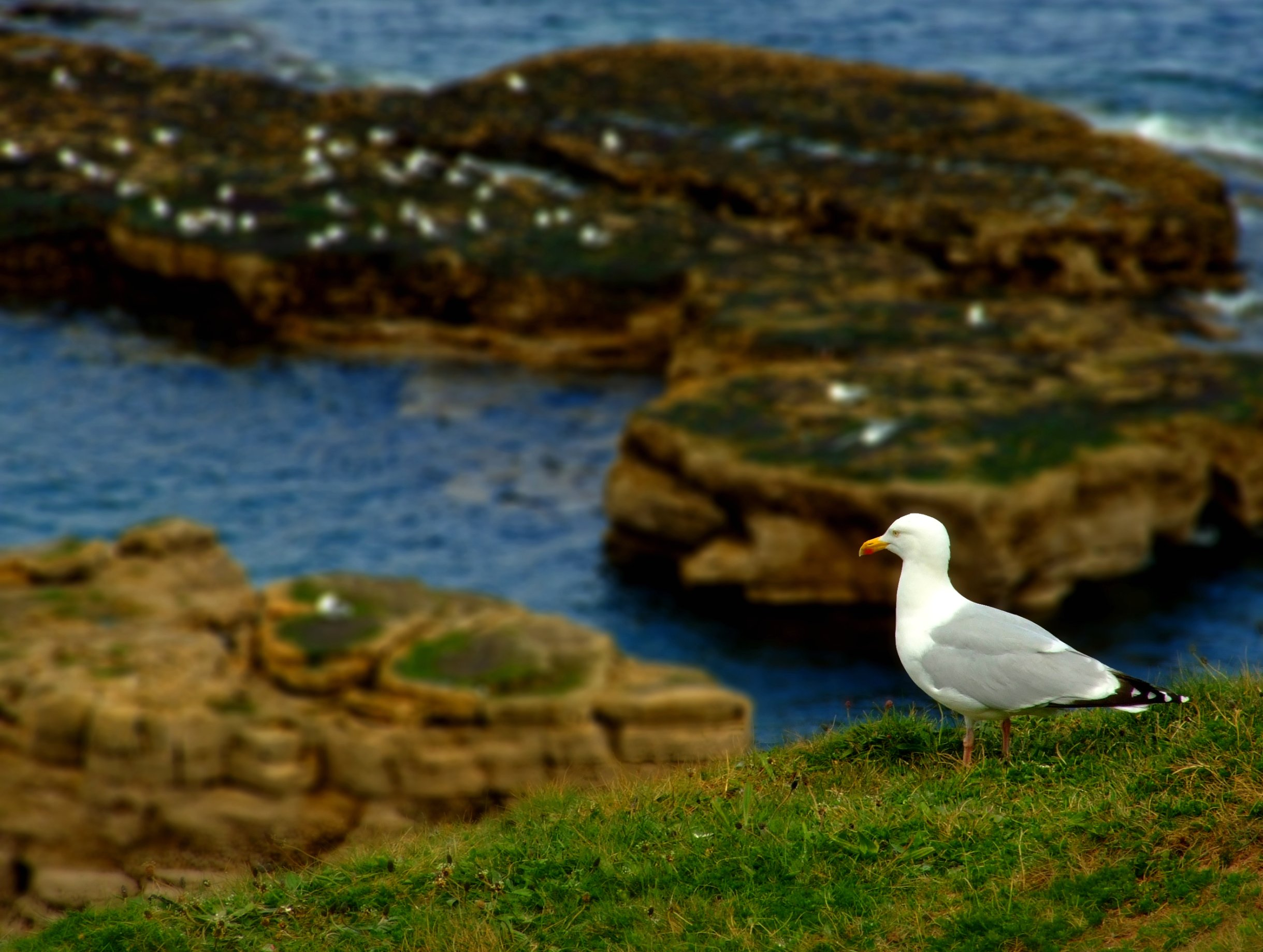
Gull resting on the cliffs between Whitburn and Marsden

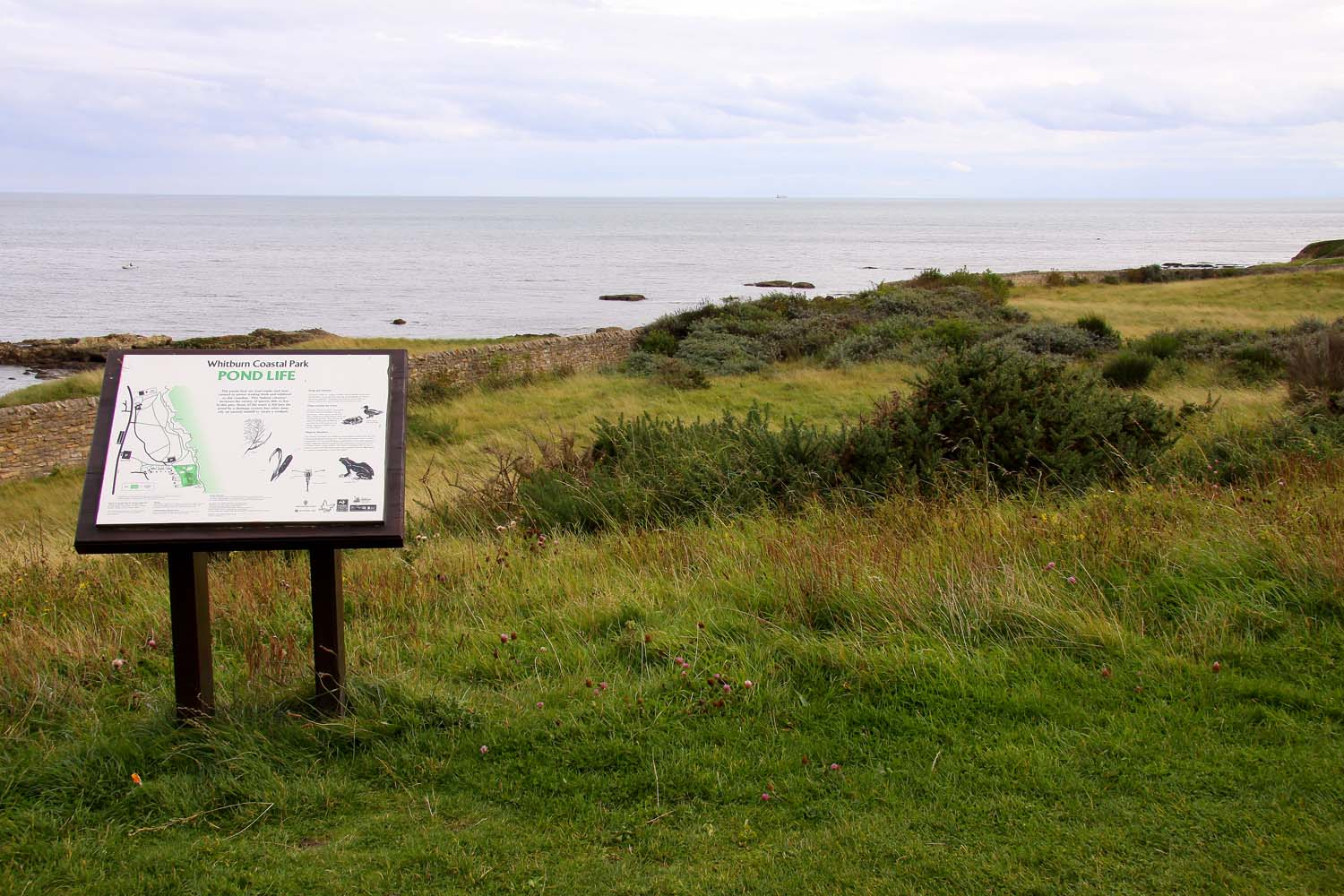
Information board in Whitburn Coastal Park.

=== Shops, amenities and recreation ===
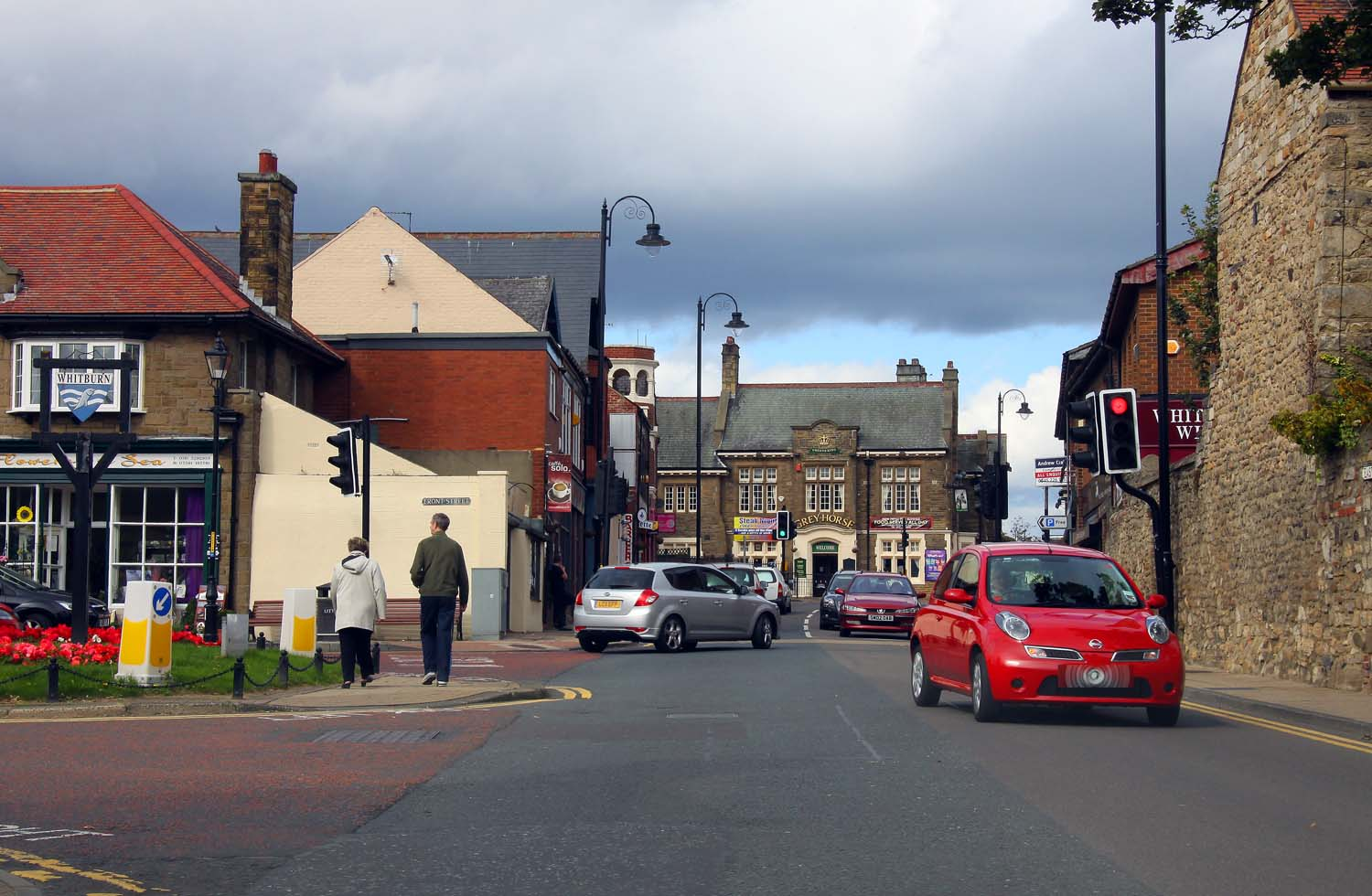
East Street near the centre of Whitburn, approaching the village shops.

Whitburn contains shops which include convenience stores, a butchers, an ice-cream parlour, an antiques store and pubs. Historically, a recreational ground was gifted to the village in 1897. Today, Cornthwaite Park to the south of the village is Whitburn's primary recreational space. The Park, named after a local councillor, was constructed in the 1960s and was built on open land previously known as Church Fields. It contains flower beds, ornamental tree planting, a children's play area, a bowling green, and tennis courts. Whitburn Cricket Club was established in 1862 in the grounds of Whitburn Hall. The club still survives today, located on East Street to the north of Cornthwaite Park. Another local sports club, Whitburn Golf Club, is located to the east of Cleadon Hills.

=== Schools ===
The village's first school was built in 1824 and a second was built in 1856. Today, there are three schools in Whitburn: Whitburn Village Primary School, Marsden Primary School and Whitburn Church of England Academy (formerly Whitburn Comprehensive School). The schools' latest Ofsted inspections records all three as being "Good".

Whitburn Village Primary School and Marsden Primary School performance at end of Key Stage 2 (2019)
	Whitburn Village Primary School	Marsden Primary School	Local authority (Note: South Tyneside Council) average	England average
% of pupils meeting expected standard	63	72	66	65
% of pupils achieving at a higher standard	6	16	12	11

Whitburn Church of England Academy performance at end of Key Stage 4 (2019)
	Whitburn C of E Academy	Local authority average	England average
% of pupils with Grade 5 or above in English & maths GCSE	50	34	43
% of pupils staying in education or entering employment	97	92	94
Attainment 8 score (Note: Attainment 8 score is calculated by adding together a student's highest scores across eight government-approved qualifications.)	52.5	42.6	46.7

=== Religion ===
Whitburn has three churches: Whitburn Parish Church, St Vincent's Catholic Church and Whitburn Methodist Church. Whitburn Parish Church is a Grade II listed building and is the oldest surviving building in the village. Little is known of the church's history and there is no record of its dedication. However, there is evidence that it dates from the 13th century. The top of the tower was added in the 15th century, and the church was restored by Newcastle architects Austin & Johnson in 1867-8. Following the attack of the Spanish Armada on England in 1588, two Spanish galleons ran aground on Whitburn Rocks and it is thought that two bells from one of the galleons were placed in Whitburn Church when it was restored. Until All Saints' Church in Cleadon was built in 1869, the residents of Cleadon used Whitburn Parish Church as their place of worship. The church contains an effigy tomb dating from 1689 which contains the bodies of Michael and Isobel Matthew – a couple from the Matthew family of Cleadon who originally built the historic building of Cleadon Tower. The tomb is a testimony to the family's wealth and significance. Michael Matthew is represented on the tomb as an elderly gentleman lying down, his head on a pillow, and holding a book with the inscription shall not lye here but rise.

Saint Vincent's Catholic Church is a small church built in the 1950s located on Mill Lane at the corner of Poplar Drive.

Whitburn Methodist Church is located on the corner of Lizard Lane. It was constructed in 1881 to replace the original Wesleyan Chapel. Wesleyan influence entered the area when John Wesley visited Sunderland and Cleadon in the mid-18th century.

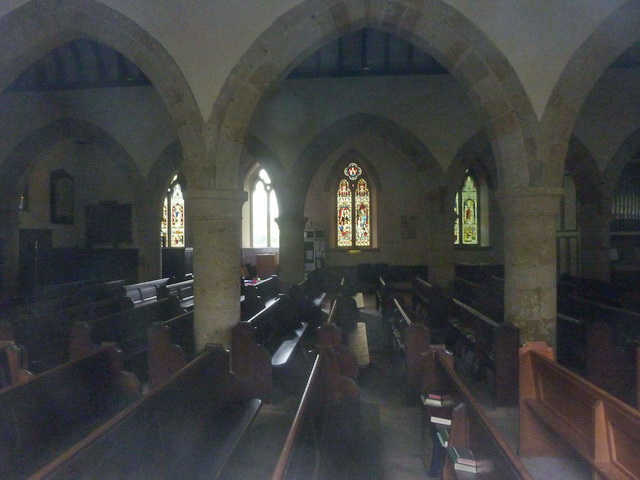
Interior of Whitburn Parish Church.

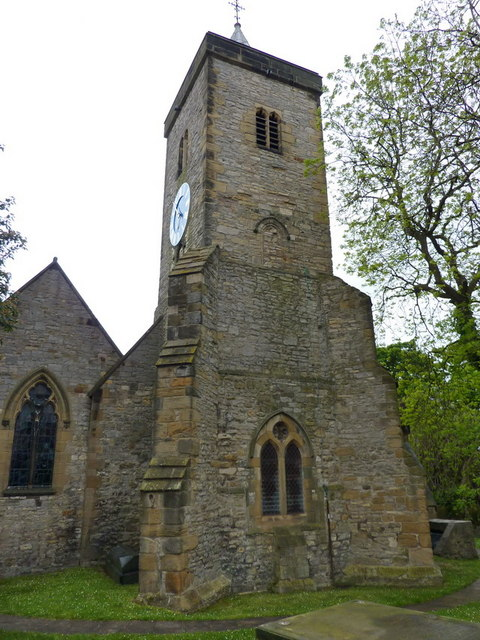
Spire of Whitburn Parish Church.

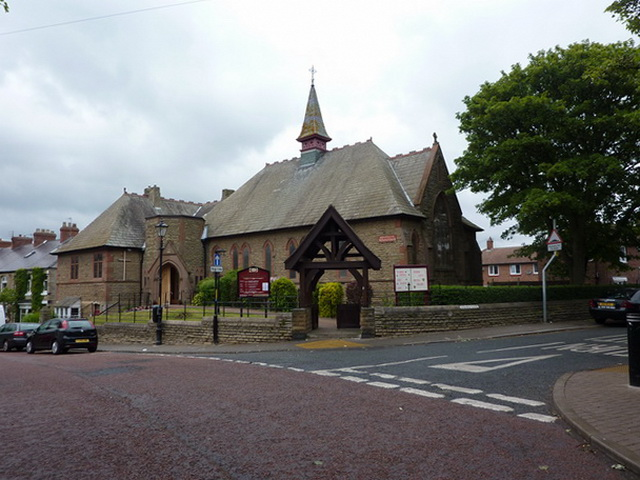
Exterior of Whitburn Methodist Church.

== Transport ==
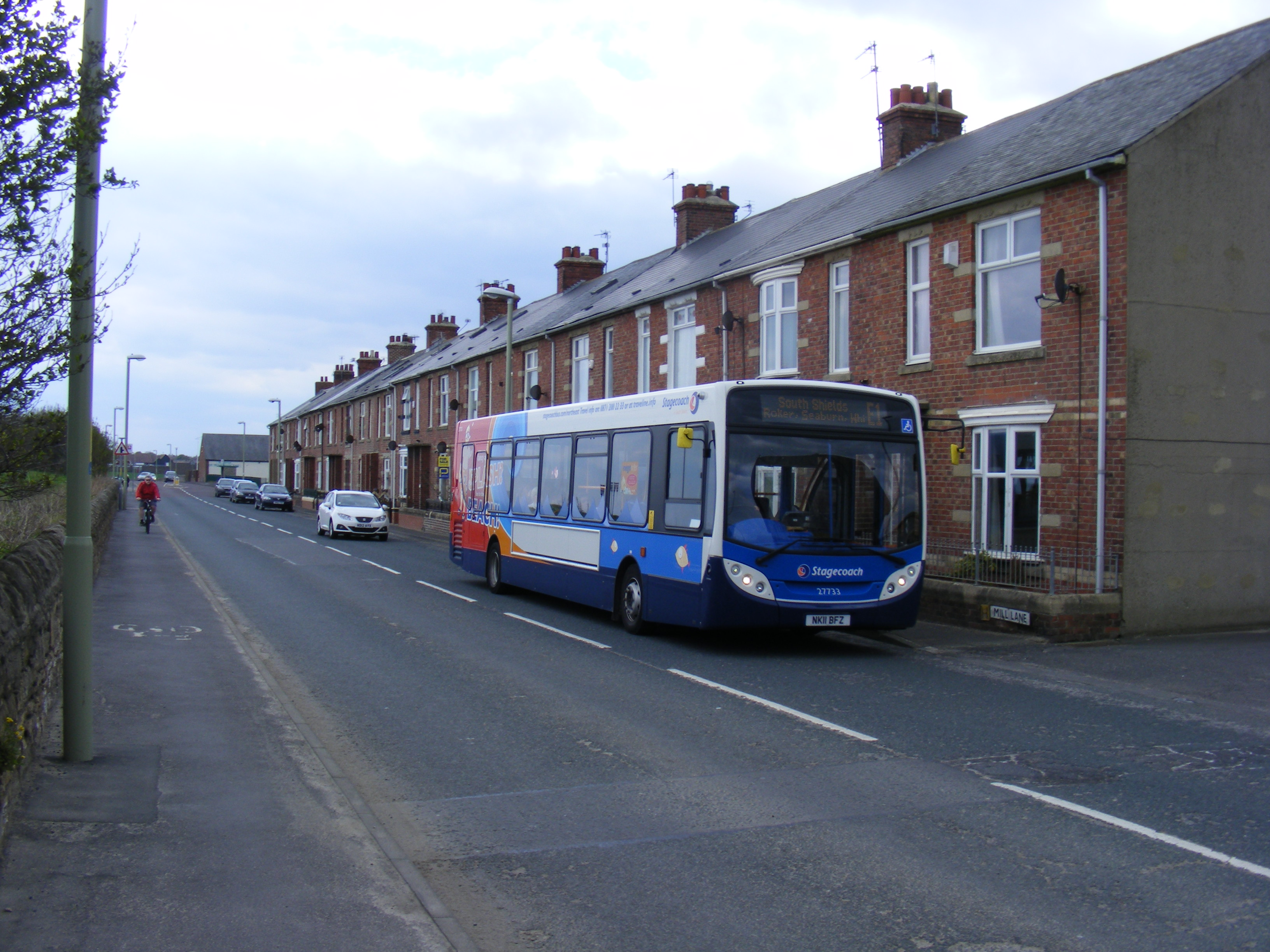
Bus on Mill Lane to the north of Whitburn.

Whitburn lies on the A183 which connects Sunderland to South Shields. Whitburn was historically quite an isolated settlement; a road connecting the Bents to Sunderland was constructed in 1865, and only in 1929 was the north-south route (now the A183) completed. By the 1920s, a regular bus route operated on this road running from Sunderland to South Shields. However, low connectivity to and from the village has continued into the 21st century. Only a few roads connect Whitburn to surrounding population centres (the A183 to South Shields, Roker and Sunderland, and the B1299 to East Boldon). No railway lines enter Whitburn and so the area is not directly served by the Tyne and Wear Metro. The nearest Metro stations are East Boldon and Seaburn. The area is served by the Go North East and Stagecoach North East bus operators.

== Notable people ==
- Thomas Elliot Harrison – engineer. Lived and died in Whitburn.
- Jimmy Seed – footballer, striker for Tottenham Hotspur where he won the FA Cup in 1921. Brought up in Whitburn.
- Jack Young and Billy Henderson (footballers) – both full-backs played for West Ham United in the 1923 FA Cup Final. Born in Whitburn.
- Jack Smith – footballer for Portsmouth Football Club. Born in Whitburn.
- Jack Weddle – footballer, striker for Portsmouth and Blackburn Rovers. Lived in Whitburn.
- Sep Smith – footballer, player for Leicester City F.C. Born in Whitburn.
- Bill Robinson – footballer, striker for Sunderland, member of Charlton Athletic's 1947 FA Cup-winning side, and West Ham United. Born in Whitburn.
- Dave Clelland – Scottish footballer. Died in Whitburn aged 80.
- Julie Elliott – Labour Party MP for Sunderland Central. Born in Whitburn.
- Nadine Shah – musician. Grew up in Whitburn.
