= Billy Jennings (Welsh footballer) =

Welsh footballer and manager

Personal information
- Full name: William Jennings
- Date of birth: 25 February 1893
- Place of birth: Barry, Wales
- Date of death: 12 November 1968 (aged 75)
- Place of death: Penarth, Wales
- Height: 5 ft 9 in (1.75 m)
- Positions: Left half; full back

Senior career*
Years	Team	Apps	(Gls)
- Barry Town
- Bethel Baptists
- Barry Town
1912–1930	Bolton Wanderers	267	(2)

International career
1914–1928	Wales	11	(0)

Managerial career
- 1937–1939: Cardiff City
- * Club domestic league appearances and goals as of 11:08, 29 October 2008 (UTC)

William Jennings (25 February 1893 – 1968) was a Welsh footballer best known for playing for Bolton Wanderers, for whom he made over 250 appearances in The Football League. He played for Bolton in the 1923 and 1926 FA Cup Finals. He also played 11 times for the Welsh national team and later had a two-year spell in charge of Cardiff City.

== Honours ==
Bolton Wanderers

- FA Cup: 1922–23, 1925–26

== Personal life ==
Jennings served as a corporal in the Royal Air Force during the First World War.
