= Sid Bishop (footballer, born 1900) =

English footballer

Personal information
- Full name: Sidney Macdonald Bishop
- Date of birth: 10 February 1900
- Place of birth: Stepney, England
- Date of death: 4 May 1949 (aged 49)
- Place of death: Fulham, England
- Height: 5 ft 11 in (1.80 m)
- Position: Left half

Youth career
- Ilford

Senior career*
Years	Team	Apps	(Gls)
–1920	Crystal Palace		
1920–1926	West Ham United	159	(10)
1926–1928	Leicester City	49	(7)
1928–1933	Chelsea	103	(5)

International career
1927	England	4	(1)
- * Club domestic league appearances and goals

Sidney Macdonald Bishop (10 February 1900 – 4 May 1949) was an English footballer whose main position was right-sided half-back, although he also sometimes played as an inside forward.

== Career ==
Bishop began his days as a footballer playing for London Schools, as well as playing Air Force Football during the First World War. Bishop continued his career at Ilford, before moving on to Crystal Palace.

Bishop transferred to West Ham United in 1920 and was part of the West Ham team that won promotion to the First Division and also appeared in the famous White Horse Final, the first FA Cup final at the brand new Wembley Stadium, during the 1922–23 season.

He played for them until November 1926, making 172 appearances and netting 10 goals. He became known affectionately by the fans of West Ham as Sticks.

Bishop went on to play club football for Leicester City where he gained England international recognition, winning four caps, the first of them against Scotland on 2 April 1927 (in a later era he might have played for Scotland, as his mother was from Aberdeenshire). He also scored one goal for England in the 86th minute of a match against Luxembourg on 21 May 1927 which England won 5–2.

He moved to Chelsea in June 1928 for £4,500 and made over 100 appearances for the club before retiring in May 1933.

== Honours ==
West Ham United

- FA Cup runner-up: 1922–23
