= Jack Mackesy =

English footballer

Personal information
- Date of birth: 24 February 1890
- Place of birth: Deptford, England
- Date of death: 4 May 1963 (aged 73)
- Place of death: Lewisham, England
- Positions: Half back; inside forward

Senior career*
Years	Team	Apps	(Gls)
- Deptford Invicta
1912–1923	West Ham United	22	(2)
- * Club domestic league appearances and goals

Jack Mackesy (24 February 1890 – 4 May 1963) was an English footballer who played as a half back and an inside forward.

== Career ==
Born in Deptford in 1890, Mackesy began his career with local club Deptford Invicta, before signing for West Ham United in 1912. On 22 April 1912, Mackesy scored on his West Ham debut in a 3–1 away loss against Swindon Town in the Southern League. Following the outbreak of World War I, Mackesy captained West Ham's reserves in the London Combination, scoring 11 goals in 55 appearances. Following the culmination of the war, and West Ham's election into the Football League, Mackesy remained with the club, making ten Second Division appearances over the course of three years.
