= 1923 FA Cup final =

Football match

1923 FA Cup Final
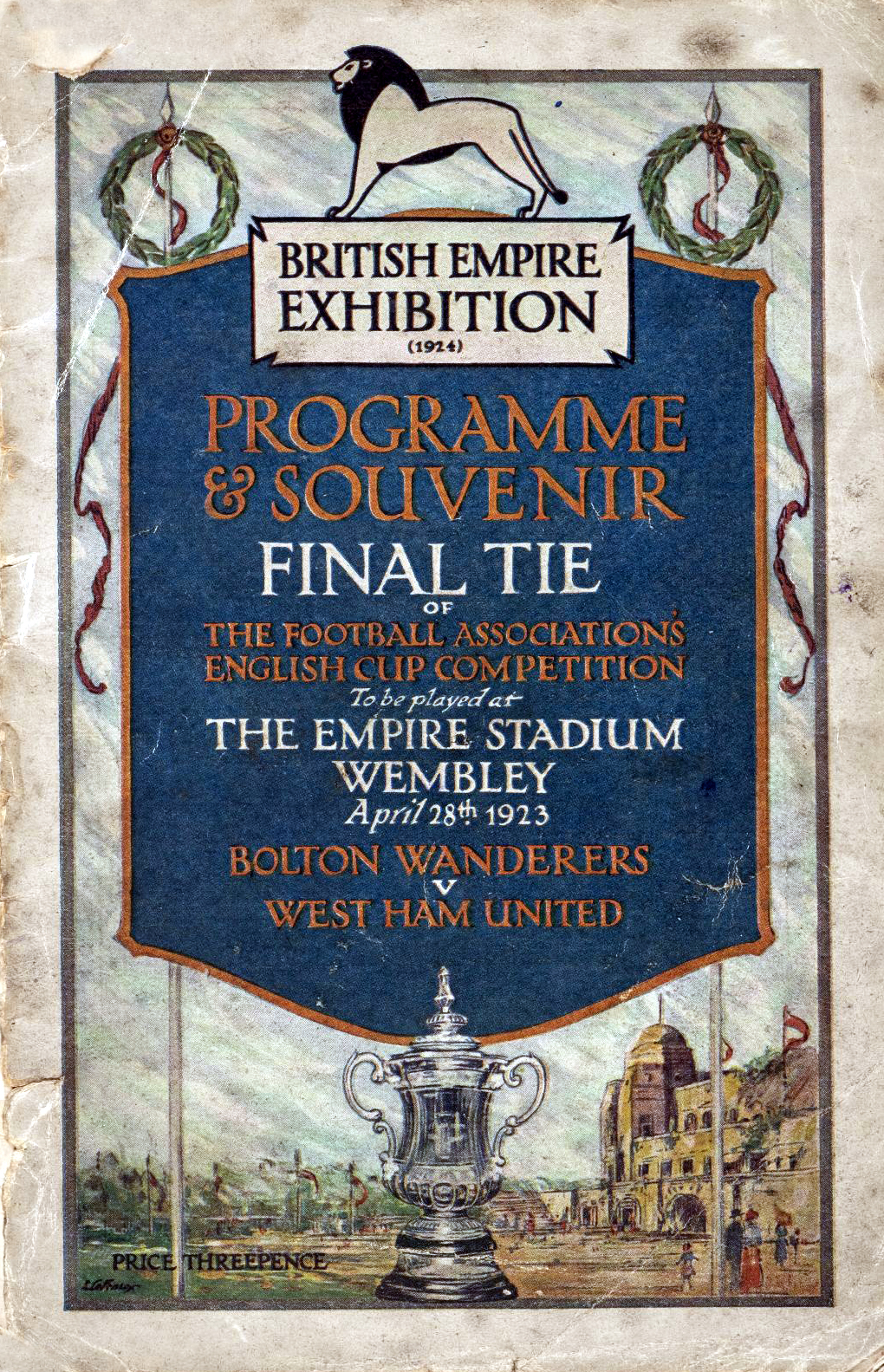
- Official programme
- Event: 1922–23 FA Cup
Bolton Wanderers	West Ham United
2	0
- Date: 28 April 1923
- Venue: Wembley Stadium, London
- Referee: D. H. Asson (Birmingham)
- Attendance: 126,047 (official) up to 300,000 (estimate)

The 1923 FA Cup final was an association football match between Bolton Wanderers and West Ham United on 28 April 1923 at the original Wembley Stadium in London. The showpiece match of English football's primary cup competition, the Football Association Challenge Cup (better known as the FA Cup), it was the first football match to be played at Wembley Stadium. King George V was in attendance to present the trophy to the winning team.

Each team had progressed through five rounds to reach the final. Bolton Wanderers won 1–0 in every round from the third onwards, and David Jack scored the lone goal each time. West Ham United faced opposition from the Second Division or lower in each round, the first time this had occurred since the introduction of multiple divisions in the Football League. West Ham took three attempts to defeat Southampton in the fourth round but then easily defeated Derby County in the semi-final, scoring five goals.

The final was preceded by chaotic scenes as vast crowds surged into the stadium, far exceeding its official capacity of approximately 125,000. A crowd estimated at up to 300,000 gained entrance and the terraces overflowed, with the result that many spectators found their way into the area around the pitch and even onto the playing area itself. Mounted policemen, including one on a grey horse which featured in the defining photographic image of the day, had to be brought in to clear the crowds from the pitch and allow the match to take place. The match began 45 minutes late as the vast crowd was shepherded by police to clear the pitch and stand around the perimeter. Although West Ham started strongly, Bolton proved the dominant team for most of the match and won 2–0. David Jack scored a goal two minutes after the start of the match and Jack Smith added a controversial second goal during the second half.

The pre-match overcrowding prompted discussion in the House of Commons and led to the introduction of safety measures for future finals. The match is often referred to as the "White Horse Final" and is commemorated by the White Horse Bridge at the new Wembley Stadium.

== Route to the final ==
Bolton Wanderers
Round	Opposition	Score
1st	Norwich City (a)	2–0
2nd	Leeds United (h)	3–1
3rd	Huddersfield Town (a)	1–1
3rd	Huddersfield Town (h)	1–0
4th	Charlton Athletic (a)	1–0
Semi-final	Sheffield United (n)	1–0

Bolton Wanderers and West Ham United were playing in the First Division and Second Division respectively, and both entered the competition at the first round stage, under the tournament format in place at the time. Bolton had appeared in the final twice before, in 1894 and 1904, but West Ham, who had only joined The Football League in 1919, had never previously progressed further than the quarter finals. In the first round, Bolton defeated Norwich City of the Third Division South, in the process recording the club's first away win in the competition since a second round victory over Manchester City in the 1904–05 season. After a home win over Leeds United in the second round, Bolton faced one of the First Division's top teams, Huddersfield Town, in the third round. The initial match at Huddersfield's Leeds Road ground ended in a draw, necessitating a replay which Bolton won 1–0. In the fourth round Bolton defeated Charlton Athletic by a single goal, and in the semi-final beat Sheffield United by the same score in a match played at Old Trafford, home of Manchester United. Although ticket prices were considered to be extremely high, a crowd of 72,000 attended the match, a new record for an FA Cup semi-final. The conditions at the semi-final foreshadowed the more extreme condition that followed at Wembley. Old Trafford was dangerously overcrowded, with spectators spilling over onto the touchline, and a disaster was only prevented by the good nature of the crowd.

In every match from the third round onwards, Bolton's single goal was scored by David Jack, which gave him a reputation for having single-handedly steered his team into the final.

West Ham United
Round	Opposition	Score
1st	Hull City (a)	3–2
2nd	Brighton & Hove Albion (a)	1–1
2nd	Brighton & Hove Albion (h)	1–0
3rd	Plymouth Argyle (h)	2–0
4th	Southampton (a)	1–1
4th	Southampton (h)	1–1
4th	Southampton (n)	1–0
Semi-final	Derby County (n)	5–2

In contrast to Bolton's defensive style, West Ham's cup run was characterised by fast-moving, attacking play, which won them many admirers. The London-based club began the competition away to fellow Second Division team Hull City and won 3–2. In the second round they were held to a draw by Brighton & Hove Albion of the Third Division South, but won the replay 1–0 at home. The "Hammers" defeated another Third Division South team, Plymouth Argyle, in the third round, but found the fourth round tough going against Southampton. The first match at West Ham's home, the Boleyn Ground, ended in a 1–1 draw, as did the replay at The Dell in Southampton. A second replay was held at Villa Park in Birmingham, home of Aston Villa, and finally produced a winner, as West Ham won 1–0 with a goal from Billy Brown. The goal came in the 70th minute, with a "clever free kick" past the "startled" Herbert Lock in the Saints' goal. In the semi-finals, West Ham took on Derby County at Stamford Bridge, home of Chelsea, and won 5–2. Brown scored two more goals and Billy Moore also scored twice.

All five of the teams that West Ham defeated on their way to Wembley played in the Second Division or lower. This made West Ham the first team since the introduction of multiple divisions in The Football League to reach the FA Cup final without facing opposition from the top division. Bolton played their last league match of the season on 21 April, and although West Ham had two matches left to play of their Second Division campaign, they also had a week’s rest from football before the cup final. Both teams rested and took the opportunity to prepare by visiting brine baths, Bolton going to baths at Northwich and West Ham to Southend.

== Build-up ==
=== Number of spectators ===
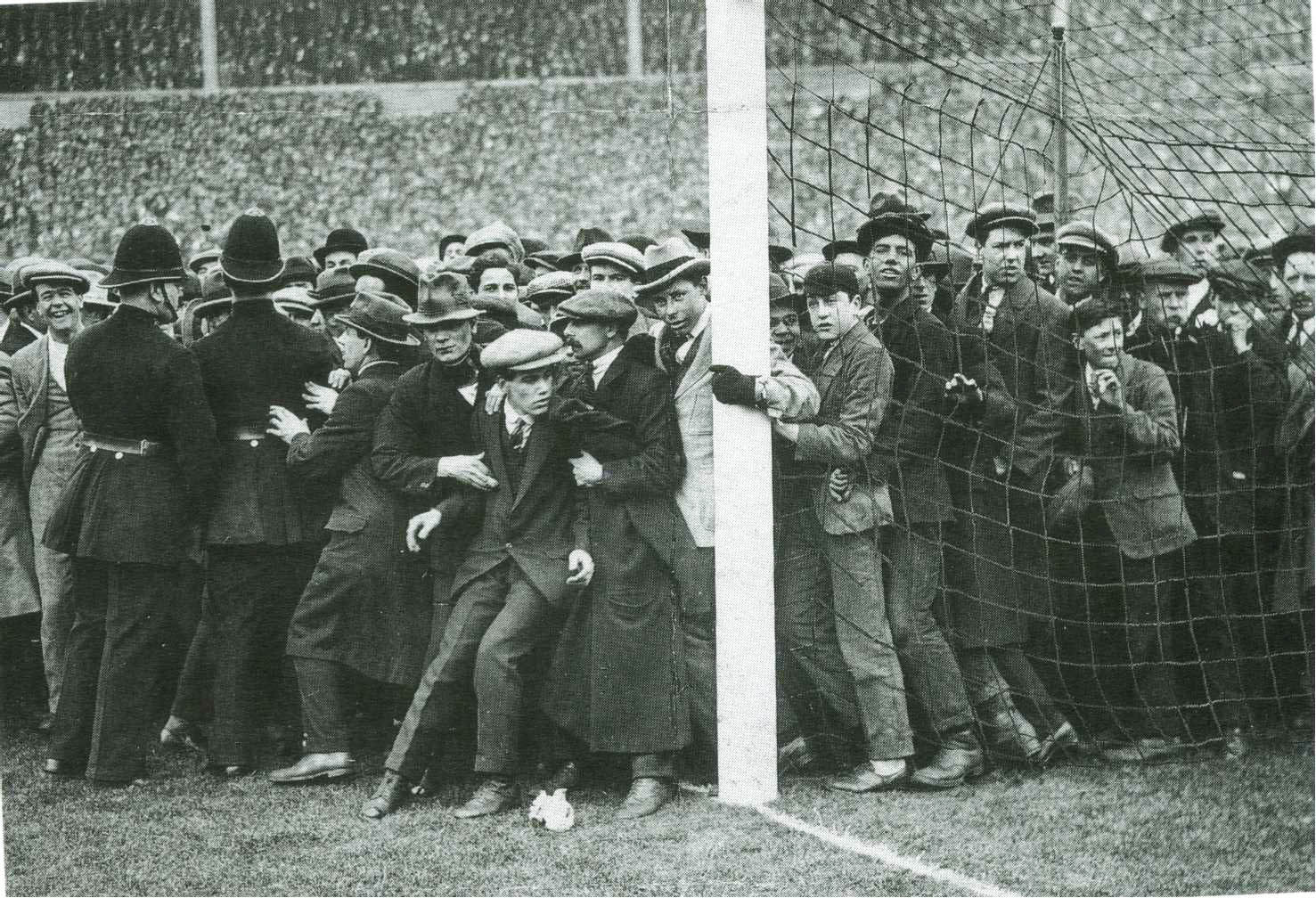
The crowd was so large that fans swarmed right up to, and even onto, the pitch.

The total number of people in attendance is not known; the official attendance (those who paid for a ticket) was 126,047, but estimates of the actual number of fans in attendance range from 150,000 to the official Police estimate of just under 300,000, with other estimates putting it higher than 300,000. The 126,047 official attendance at Wembley is below the 173,850 official attendance of the Brazil v Uruguay World Cup match at the Maracanã Stadium in Rio de Janeiro, Brazil in 1950. The official attendance statistic for the game in Rio is the official world record. Some of the unofficial estimates for the Wembley match are higher than even the unofficial estimates for the game at the Maracanã, which range up to 210,000.

The match was the first event of any kind to take place at Wembley Stadium, which had not been due to open until 1924 but was completed ahead of schedule. After sub-capacity crowds had attended the first three finals after the First World War at Stamford Bridge, The Football Association (The FA) was unconvinced that the match could fill the large capacity of the new stadium and undertook a major advertising campaign, for fans to attend. Despite these fears, the new national stadium, which had been advertised as the greatest venue of its kind and had an unprecedented capacity of 125,000, proved to be a great lure and drew a large number of casual observers. The fact that a London-based team was competing meant that many football fans from all parts of the city chose to attend. The morning newspapers on the day of the match reported that around 5,000 fans were travelling from Bolton and that they were expected to be joined by "at least 115,000 enthusiasts from London and other parts of the country". The easy accessibility of the stadium by public transport and the fine weather were also factors which contributed to the enormous crowd.

About a dozen of us started out from the top of the Victoria Dock Road. It was like a pilgrimage. We spoke to farm boys who had already tramped from Romford, Hornchurch and Dagenham. I chatted for a while with a group of fishermen from Southend who had moored at Barking and tramped on from there. My brothers tried to chat up a gang of girls who worked the fish at Barking.

As we walked through the East End, hordes joined us from Whitechapel and Limehouse. At Bethnal Green a big bunch of Jewish lads of the Hakoah football team, marching like soldiers came out of the Cambridge Heath Road. Tens of thousands of boots and shoes, many holed and worn, trudged towards the Empire Stadium. Veterans from the great war on crutches, small boys pulling and pushing each other on every species of cart...a sea of claret and blue was rising toward Wembley.

A cacophony of singing, hooters, horns, klaxons and rattles filled the air. Everywhere there were hammers being waved about, some purloined from fireplaces, others six-foot creations of wood, papier mache and cardboard; white, silver and gold. The Irons were on the march!

— Jim Belton, spectator.

Many travelled by train with London Underground selling more than 241,000 tickets from stations within London to Wembley, but that figure does not cover those who travelled without a ticket and those who reached the stadium by road or on foot. The London buses were overwhelmed with the controller of the London General Omnibus Company describing the situation as "absolutely abnormal" and in the East End, the worst affected area, as "absolutely terrific", while large crowds, possibly tens of thousands, walked ten to fifteen miles or more each way from east to west London.

Significant numbers of Bolton supporters (5,000 had been expected before the game) made their way from Lancashire to Wembley, including five fans who used the Daimler Hire plane service from Manchester Aerodrome to London, with most of the remainder coming by train. Bolton fans headed to the West End to celebrate after the game, with Piccadilly Circus impassable to traffic for a time due to the number of revellers.

As well as West Ham and Bolton fans, there were many people from other parts of the capital who wished to support the London underdog. Of the eleven supporters kept in overnight at the Willesden Hospital four were from Bow, Poplar, Wapping and Walthamstow in East London, four from other parts of London, two from northern England, and one from Wisbech in Cambridgeshire.

Among the supporters was a Pathé News cameraman disguised as a West Ham supporter. Pathe's bid had failed to win the rights to film the event, but they sent a disguised cameraman anyway, wearing fake spectacles, a false moustache and carrying a camera hidden in a large cardboard hammer. Many of the day's moving images were taken among the crowds in this way.

=== Crowds build ===
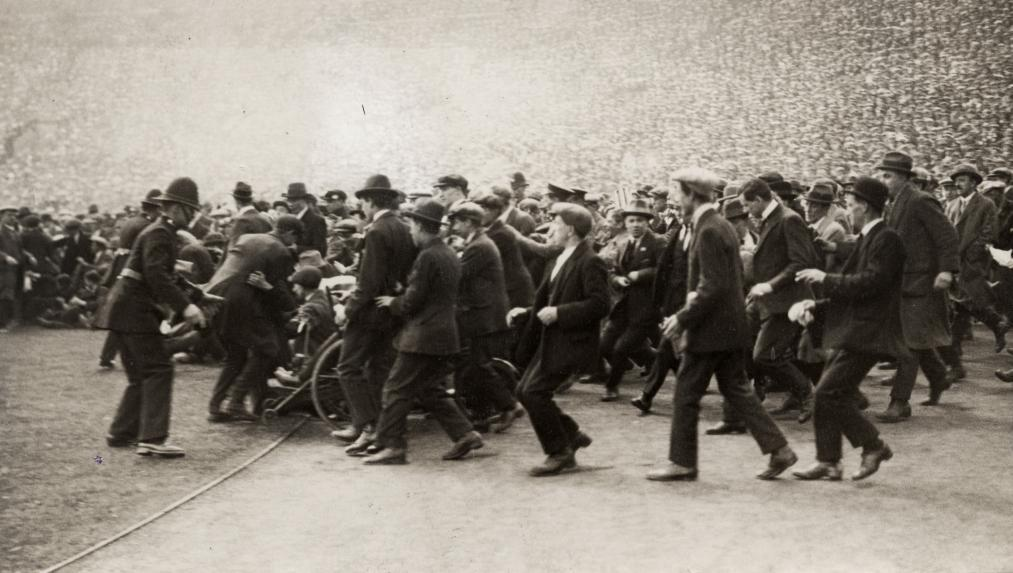
Fans flood the pitch

The gates were opened at 11:30 am as advertised, three and a half hours before the match was due to begin, and until 1:00 pm the flow of people into the stadium was orderly. By 1:00 pm, however, a vast number of people were pouring into the stadium, and after an inspection by the stadium authorities, the decision was made to close the gates at 1:45 pm. Spectator William Rose said later that the route to the stadium was "seething with people" and that "the nearer I got to the stadium the worse it got, by the time I got there the turnstiles had been closed". Although the information was relayed to various railway stations, thousands of people continued to arrive and mass outside the gates. Organisation within the stadium was poor, and in his report on the match the correspondent for the Daily Mail described the stewarding as "useless" and stated that officials in and around the stadium "seemed to know nothing". Fans were not directed to any specific area, and the tiers in the lower half of the stadium filled up much faster than those higher up.

Dad was very nonchalant about it. He said: 'Let's see if we can get in to see the match.' When we got out at Wembley Park we were in a huge wave of humanity all going in the same direction. It was just a solid mass of people, though I don't ever remember feeling scared because the crowd were so good-natured. There was a seething mass at the entrance. Dad said: 'Look, everybody's going over the turnstiles. Let's follow them.' They were locked. The staff had obviously just locked up and left. So we climbed over the fence and the turnstile and found ourselves inside the ground.

— Denis Higham, spectator.

Under the conditions, gaining access to the ground did not guarantee a view of play, so many tried to find a better position; some supporters found a ladder and then shimmied up a drainpipe to secure a position on the roof, while reporters complained that more than three-quarters of people in the press box, suspended under the roof high above the stands, were fans with no right to be there.

As the crowds outside the stadium continued to grow, local police stations were mobilised, but by the time officers arrived the crowd was too large for them to take any effective action. At 2:15 pm, the crowds outside the stadium rushed at the barriers and forced their way in. Spectators in the lower tiers had to climb the fences to escape the crush and overflowed onto the pitch itself. Spectator Terry Hickey said later that "To put it mildly, the whole thing was a bloody shambles". The roads around the stadium were blocked and the Bolton players were forced to abandon their coach a mile from the stadium and make their way through the crowds. The stadium authorities were considering calling the game off, but feared the consequences of an angry response to such a decision.

I was hoisted to the front of the crowd, but had lost contact with my brothers...there were plenty of other kids in the same position. I saw the king, near enough to touch he was. He was nodding to the people as he went by 'Steady boys' I heard him say 'let's make a good show here'. He was smiling and chuckling, occasionally waving his cane in the air. He seemed to be loving it.

— Jim Belton, spectator.

West Ham board members and players said that the teams were persuaded to go ahead with the game by a representative of the king, on the basis that it would be a friendly match, with the cup final itself played at a later date. West Ham players said they learned the match would stand as a cup final during half time, while George Davis of the West Ham board said that the boards of both clubs learned this later in the game.

The Times stated that at one point it seemed impossible that the match would ever be able to start, but the tide turned at 2:45pm, when King George V arrived and was escorted to the royal box. The bands of the Irish and Grenadier Guards, wedged in tightly among the crowds, played "God Save The King" at a noticeably rushed pace, and the crowds sang along with enthusiasm. This was followed by a fervent three cheers for the king and the crowd began to assist the authorities in clearing the playing area.

=== Clearing the pitch ===
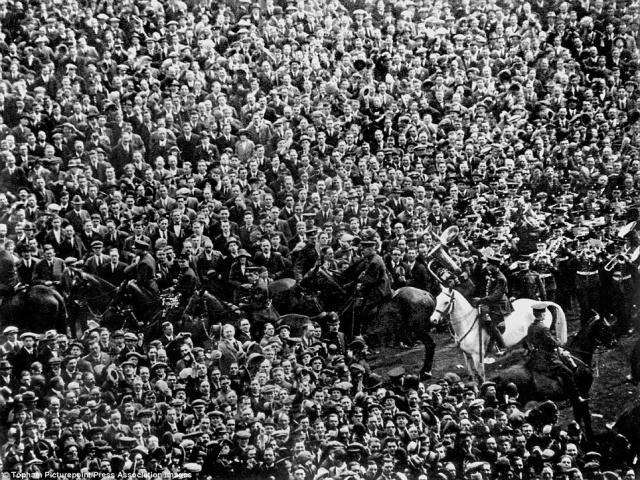
"Billie" the white horse was the defining image of the day when mounted police cleared fans from the Wembley pitch.

At 3:10 pm the players entered the field of play and joined the police in asking the crowd to withdraw so that the game could be played, but the players were soon mobbed by enthusiastic supporters and found themselves trapped on the pitch. Players were tired and shaken as a result of well-intentioned backslapping and vigorous handshaking of the crowd, and as most of the crowd were supporting West Ham, this impacted them much more than Bolton, with Jack Tresadern and Jimmy Ruffell, who was recovering from a shoulder injury, worst affected; with Ruffell experiencing nausea due to the intense pain. While out on the pitch, Bolton's Scottish striker Jack Smith felt a tap on his shoulder, and turned to see his brother, whom he had not seen in six years.

Eventually mounted policemen were brought in to try to clear the crowds from the pitch, including PC George Scorey, who was mounted on a horse named "Billie" (some sources spell the name "Billy"). PC Scorey had not been on duty that day but answered a call for emergency assistance as the throng of spectators in the stadium grew. Billie, a grey horse, appeared white in the (high-contrast) black and white newsreel footage of the era. Other horses were also involved, but the "white" horse, as the most visible in the news footage, became the defining image of the day and the final is often known as the "White Horse Final".

As my horse picked his way onto the field, I saw nothing but a sea of heads. I thought, "We can't do it. It's impossible." But I happened to see an opening near one of the goals and the horse was very good – easing them back with his nose and tail until we got a goal-line cleared. I told them in front to join hands and heave and they went back step by step until we reached the line. Then they sat down and we went on like that ... it was mainly due to the horse. Perhaps because he was white he commanded more attention. But more than that, he seemed to understand what was required of him. The other helpful thing was the good nature of the crowd.

— George Scorey in an interview with the BBC.

While the pitch was being cleared, the event choir, St Luke’s, sang "Abide with Me"; the crowds of West Ham supporters walking back to the East End are also said to have sung the song. The choir’s spontaneous recital may be the origin of the tradition of singing the song before cup finals, a practice which has been in place since at least 1927.

After the police, assisted by appeals from the players for the crowd to calm, had manoeuvred the spectators to just beyond the touchline, the game began approximately 45 minutes late, while fans stood around the perimeter of the pitch.

== Match ==
=== Tactics ===
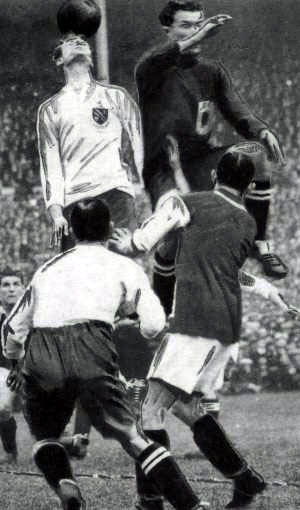
Dick Pym and two other Bolton players defend their goal.

Both teams employed the 2-3-5 formation typical of the era: two full-backs, three half-backs, comprising one centre-half and two wing-halves, and five forwards, comprising two outside-forwards, two inside-forwards and a centre-forward. West Ham's game plan initially centred on the two fast-moving outside-forwards Dick Richards and Ruffell, but Bolton set out from the start to keep the two players contained, rushing at them whenever they got the ball.

=== First half ===
After two minutes, West Ham half-back Tresadern became entangled in the crowd after taking a throw-in and was unable to return to the pitch immediately. This gave Bolton's David Jack the opportunity to shoot for goal. His shot beat West Ham goalkeeper Ted Hufton to give Bolton the lead and hit a spectator who was standing pressed against the goal net, knocking him unconscious.

Three minutes later, Vic Watson received the ball a few yards in front of the Bolton goal but his shot flew over the crossbar. Eleven minutes into the game the crowd surged forward once again and a large number of fans encroached onto the pitch, leading to the suspension of play while the mounted police again cleared the playing area. Some fans, many unconscious, required first aid from members of the British Red Cross on the pitch near the Bolton penalty area. After play resumed, policemen patrolled the perimeter of the pitch to try to keep it clear for the linesmen, after play was resumed.

Soon after play restarted, West Ham's Dick Richards eluded two Bolton defenders and shot for goal. Bolton goalkeeper Dick Pym fumbled the ball but managed to kick it clear before it crossed the goal-line. Later, Pym parried a Ruffell free-kick and easily saved a shot that Watson took on the rebound. Bolton's John Smith put the ball in the net in the 40th minute, but the goal was disallowed for offside.

Bolton continued to dominate the match, and were only prevented from scoring again by a strong performance from West Ham full-back Billy Henderson. When West Ham attacked, Bolton were able to quickly switch to a strongly defensive formation, as players changed positions to form a line of five half-backs. This stifled West Ham's attacking style of play and ensured that the Bolton goal was not seriously threatened. The score remained 1–0 to Bolton until half-time.

=== Half-time ===
Due to the crowds, the players were unable to reach the dressing rooms and instead remained on the pitch for five minutes before starting the second half.

=== Second half ===
West Ham began the second half as the stronger team, and Vic Watson received the ball in a good goalscoring position but mis-hit his shot. Eight minutes into the second half, Bolton added a second goal in controversial circumstances. Outside-forward Ted Vizard played the ball into a central position and Jack Smith hit the ball past Hufton. West Ham's players claimed that the ball had not entered the goal but rebounded into play from the goalpost, but referee D. H. Asson overruled them, stating that in his view the ball had entered the goal but then rebounded off a spectator standing behind the goal. West Ham also claimed that Bolton had received an unfair advantage, as a Bolton fan at pitchside had kicked the ball towards Vizard, but Asson disregarded these claims as well and confirmed Bolton's second goal.

At this point, the crowd began to sense that Bolton would emerge victorious and many began heading towards the exits. Neither team had any more serious chances to score, and the remainder of the match was largely a stalemate with little inspired play. Late in the game, West Ham captain George Kay attempted to persuade Asson to abandon the match, but Bolton captain Joe Smith reportedly replied "We're doing fine, ref, we'll play until dark to finish the match if necessary". The score remained 2–0 to Bolton until the final whistle. The king presented the FA Cup trophy to Joe Smith and then left the stadium to cheers from the crowd. The players from both teams received gold commemorative medals.

=== Impact of crowds on play ===
In the week before the match, West Ham manager Syd King made a radio broadcast in which he observed that the size and quality of the Wembley pitch suited his side's fast wing play and passing style, but after the match his trainer Charlie Paynter attributed his team's defeat to the damage the pitch had suffered before kick-off, saying "It was that white horse thumping its big feet into the pitch that made it hopeless. Our wingers were tumbling all over the place, tripping up in great ruts and holes".

The Bolton Evening News described the state of the playing surface:

The beautiful stretch of turf, which until two o'clock on Saturday was as green and level as a billiards table, is now a broken and uneven pitch, littered with almost every kind of rubbish, and broken into holes by the hooves of the horses of the mounted police. It is a wonder that none of the players were seriously injured for the game took place on a field sown thick with splinters of shattered glass. For two or three yards around the edges, practically all the grass has disappeared. It has been trodden down by thousands of feet into wet and sticky mud"

— Bolton Evening News, 30 April 1923,

The referee had to adapt to having a crowd inside the field of play; the approach taken was to allow play to continue if the ball struck the crowd and came back into play, and only call a throw-in if the ball went off over the heads of the crowd. George Davis of the West Ham board observed that every one of the game's throw-ins was taken from inside the field of play.

The players feared injuring the spectators on the pitch, while the players were put in danger by some of the fans. Some spectators would stick their feet out to try to trip the wingers, sometimes successfully.

The view of the press, and one accepted by the defeated West Ham side, was that Bolton were the better side on the day, and adapted to the conditions better than West Ham did. Nevertheless, the final was described as "unquestionably the most unsatisfactory match ever decided in the history of the competition".

=== Details ===
1922–23 FA Cup Final
28 April 1923
15:00 BST

Bolton Wanderers	2–0	West Ham United
Jack 2'; Jack Smith 53'	Report

Wembley Stadium, London
Attendance: 126,047 (officially)
Referee: D. H. Asson (Birmingham)

Bolton Wanderers	West Ham United

GK	(England) Dick Pym
FB	(England) Bob Haworth
FB	(England) Alex Finney
HB	(England) Harry Nuttall
HB	(England) Jimmy Seddon
HB	(Wales) Billy Jennings
FW	(England) Billy Butler
FW	(England) David Jack
FW	(Scotland) Jack Smith
FW	(England) Joe Smith (c)
FW	(Wales) Ted Vizard
Manager:
(England) Charles Foweraker

GK	(England) Ted Hufton
FB	(England) Billy Henderson
FB	(England) Jack Young
HB	(England) Sid Bishop
HB	(England) George Kay (c)
HB	(England) Jack Tresadern
FW	(Wales) Dick Richards
FW	(England) Billy Brown
FW	(England) Vic Watson
FW	(England) Billy Moore
FW	(England) Jimmy Ruffell
Manager:
(England) Syd King

Match rules

- 90 minutes.
- 30 minutes of extra time if necessary.
- Replay if scores still level.
- No substitutes.

== Aftermath ==
=== Celebration and homecoming ===
After the match, the Bolton players and officials attended a dinner in London attended by Lord Leverhulme and the two MPs for Bolton; Sir William Edge and William Russell. The next day they had lunch at the House of Commons, at which former Prime Minister David Lloyd George proposed the toast.

The Bolton players returned home by train, with two dining cars attached for the team, and were greeted at Moses Gate railway station by the chairman of Farnworth District Council before going on to a reception hosted by the Mayor. The club presented each of the victorious players with a gold watch.

The West Ham side returned home on a motor-bus, accompanied by an informal convoy of private motor-cars that were also heading home from the game. As the West Ham team neared the River Lea, their borough boundary, they switched to a specially organised tramcar hired by the borough council. As well as the team, the tramcar also carried a band from the Metropolitan Police; its illuminated features included the club badge of crossed irons on the front of the tram, together with the motto "Well done Hammers". A second decorated tramcar carried Council dignitaries.

The trams toured the streets of West and East Ham, watched by a crowd of hundreds of thousands of people, who packed the streets to greet the returning team and celebrate the occasion. On the Sunday, there was another parade, attended by even larger numbers of people, and the team then attended a service at the East Ham Congregational Church.

=== Finishing the season ===
Bolton had completed their league season, with a 13th place finish, the Saturday before their cup final, but West Ham still had two games to play. They travelled to Sheffield to play The Wednesday on the Monday after the cup final, winning 2–0. The following Saturday, they hosted Notts County but lost 1–0. The win meant Notts County finished first in the division, but West Ham secured second place and promotion to the First Division for the first time in their history.

=== Recrimination ===
Although the conduct of the police and crowd were widely praised, the FA was heavily criticised for its organisation of the final, and refunded 10% of the total gate money to fans who had pre-purchased tickets but were unable to reach their assigned seats. The West Ham board decided against requesting a replay, believing that to do so would be unsporting.

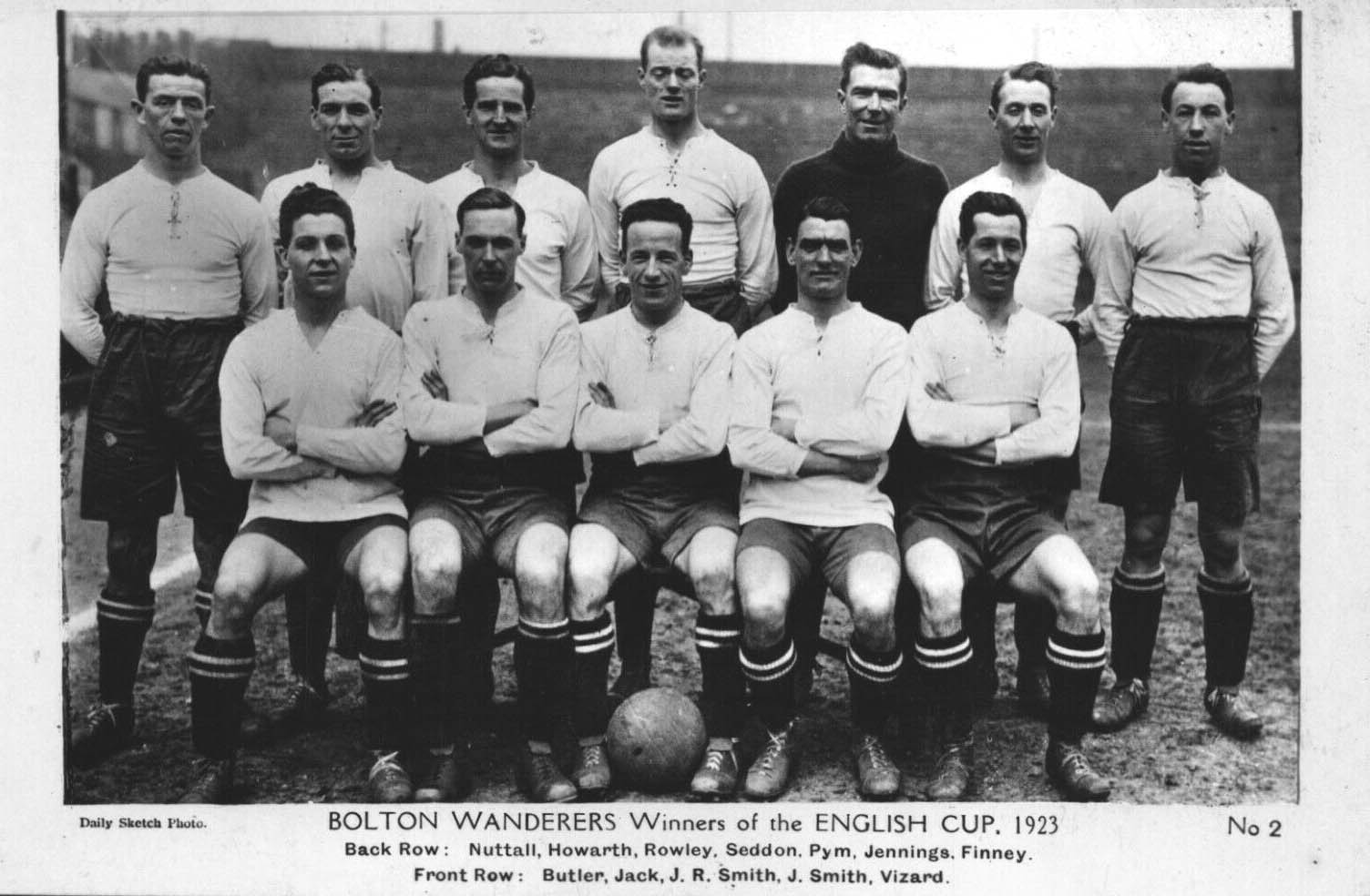
Bolton Wanderers featured as "Winners of the English Cup 1923" in weekly journal The Sketch

Around 900–1,000 spectators were treated for slight injuries; 22 were taken to hospital and ten of those were quickly discharged. Two policemen were also injured during the match. The chaotic scenes at the match prompted discussion in the House of Commons, where Home Secretary William Bridgeman paid tribute to the actions of the police and the general behaviour of the crowd. During the debate Oswald Mosley, the MP for Harrow (which included Wembley) was chastised by the Speaker of the House for characterising the fans present at the stadium as hooligans. Bridgeman was asked to consider opening a public inquiry, but ultimately concluded that the police had dealt successfully with the incident, and that he was happy for the stadium authorities and the police to decide on a plan to prevent similar events from happening again.

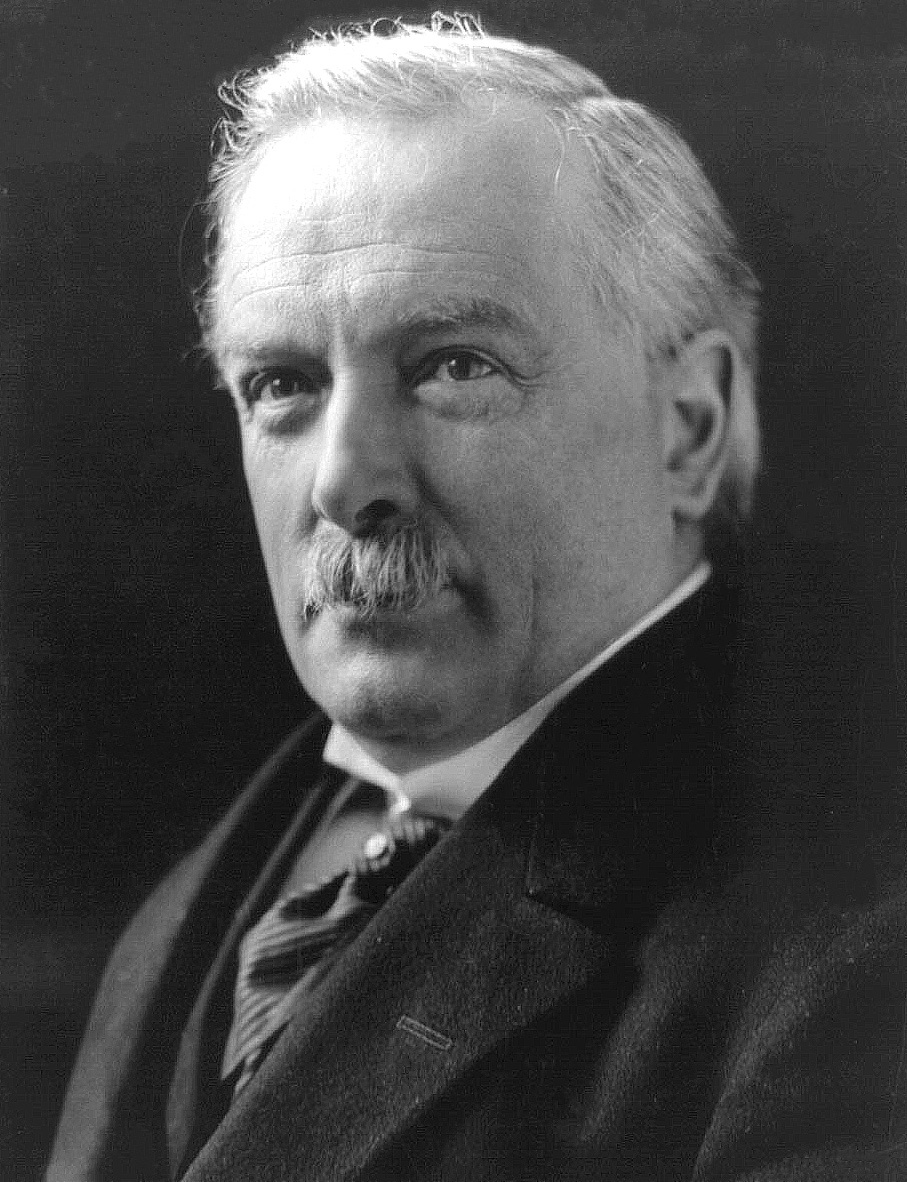
Former Prime Minister David Lloyd George gave the toast at the post-match dinner.

A committee examined the stadium a month after the match and made several recommendations to the stadium authorities. Their proposals included the replacement of the turnstiles with more up-to-date models, the erection of extra gates and railings, and the division of the terraces into self-contained sections, each with its own entrance. In addition, the pre-purchasing of tickets was made compulsory for all future finals, eliminating the possibility that excessive numbers of fans would arrive in the hope of being able to pay at the turnstile. The gross gate money for the match was £27,776. After the deduction of the stadium authorities' costs, the Football Association and each of the two clubs took £6,365, although the refunds to fans unable to reach their assigned seats were deducted from the FA's share.

=== Legacy ===
The image of Billie the white horse remains famous within English football lore, and the match is often referred to as "The White Horse Final". Billie's rider, George Scorey, was rewarded by the Football Association with free tickets to subsequent finals, but he had no interest in football and did not attend.

In 2005, a public poll chose to name the new footbridge near the rebuilt Wembley Stadium the White Horse Bridge. The executive director of the London Development Agency, which organised the poll, stated that the choice of name was appropriate given that the bridge, like the horse, would improve safety for fans at Wembley. In 2007 a play drawn from the reactions of a group of Bolton residents to the events of the final was staged at the Octagon Theatre, Bolton.

The cultural importance of the occasion is reflected in the popularity of associated items at auction. In 2005 the gold commemorative medal presented to West Ham's George Kay was sold at auction for £4,560, and tickets and programmes from the match have also been star lots at auctions.

During their first round match in the 2022–23 FA Cup, Bolton wore a remade version of the shirt they wore in this final to celebrate the centenary of them winning it.
