= Billy Charlton =

English footballer (1900–1981)

Personal information
- Full name: William George Charlton
- Date of birth: 10 October 1900
- Place of birth: Sunderland, England
- Date of death: 20 June 1981 (aged 80)
- Place of death: Sunderland, England
- Height: 5 ft 10 in (1.78 m)
- Position: Inside left

Youth career
- Robert Thompson's

Senior career*
Years	Team	Apps	(Gls)
1919–1922	South Shields	50	(12)
1922	West Ham United	8	(0)
1922–1924	Newport County	89	(19)
1924–1925	Cardiff City	0	(0)
1925–1930	Tranmere Rovers	130	(72)
1930–19??	Workington		
- * Club domestic league appearances and goals

William George Charlton (10 October 1900 – 20 June 1981) was an English footballer who played as an inside left for South Shields, West Ham United, Newport County, Cardiff City, Tranmere Rovers and Workington.

He made 137 appearances for Tranmere, scoring 74 goals.
