= D. H. Asson =

David H. Asson was the match referee at the first FA Cup Final to be staged at Wembley Stadium in 1923.

== 1923 FA Cup Final ==
The 1923 Final was the highest attended match at the time; the Football Association currently reports that the crowd numbered 200,000 . On meeting the captains before kick-off (which had been delayed until 3.45pm) Asson, reputedly, told both men 'We are only three here' (meaning three officials amongst the entire crowd and that they needed the players to help them) (Association Football (Caxton, 1960), v.2, p. 238).

The game itself was beset with problems on account of the crowd encroaching the field of play. Jack Tresadern, a West Ham United defender was caught on the wrong side of the crowd in the lead up to the early goal and could not get back onto the field before Bolton's first goal .

The second goal, in the second half, was also debatable, the shot from Jack Smith striking either spectators or the woodwork before coming back onto the field. Asson awarded a goal. West Ham also claimed that the ball had been kicked into play before the goal. The West Ham captain George Kay reputedly asked Asson to abandon the game but the match continued to conclusion .

== Background ==
The Daily Telegraph (May 19, 2007) stated that Asson's father was 'a famous Swiss referee'. There is no verification of this statement.
