= Tommy Hodgson =

English footballer

Personal information
- Date of birth: 19 January 1903
- Place of birth: Hetton-le-Hole, England
- Date of death: 4 December 1989 (aged 86)
- Place of death: Lymington, England
- Position: Full back

Senior career*
Years	Team	Apps	(Gls)
- Hetton Colliery
1921–1930	West Ham United	87	(0)
1930–1933	Luton Town	67	(0)
- Luton Postal
- * Club domestic league appearances and goals

Tommy Hodgson (19 January 1903 – 4 December 1989) was an English footballer who played as a full back.

== Career ==
A coalminer by trade, Hodgson began his career at hometown club Hetton Colliery, before signing for West Ham United in 1921. Hodgson made his debut for the club on 6 May 1922, in a 3–1 away loss against Blackpool. Hodgson's time at West Ham was marred by injuries and illness, making 87 Football League appearances during nine years at the club.

In 1930, Hodgson signed for Luton Town, where he captained the club. Hodgson made 74 appearances in all competitions for the club, leaving in the summer of 1933 to sign for non-league club Luton Postal after losing his place at Luton in September 1932. Hodgson later returned to Luton, serving the club as director, managing director, president and chairman of the club, as well as leading the Luton team out at Wembley for the 1959 FA Cup Final.
