= Whitburn Church of England Academy =

Whitburn Academy
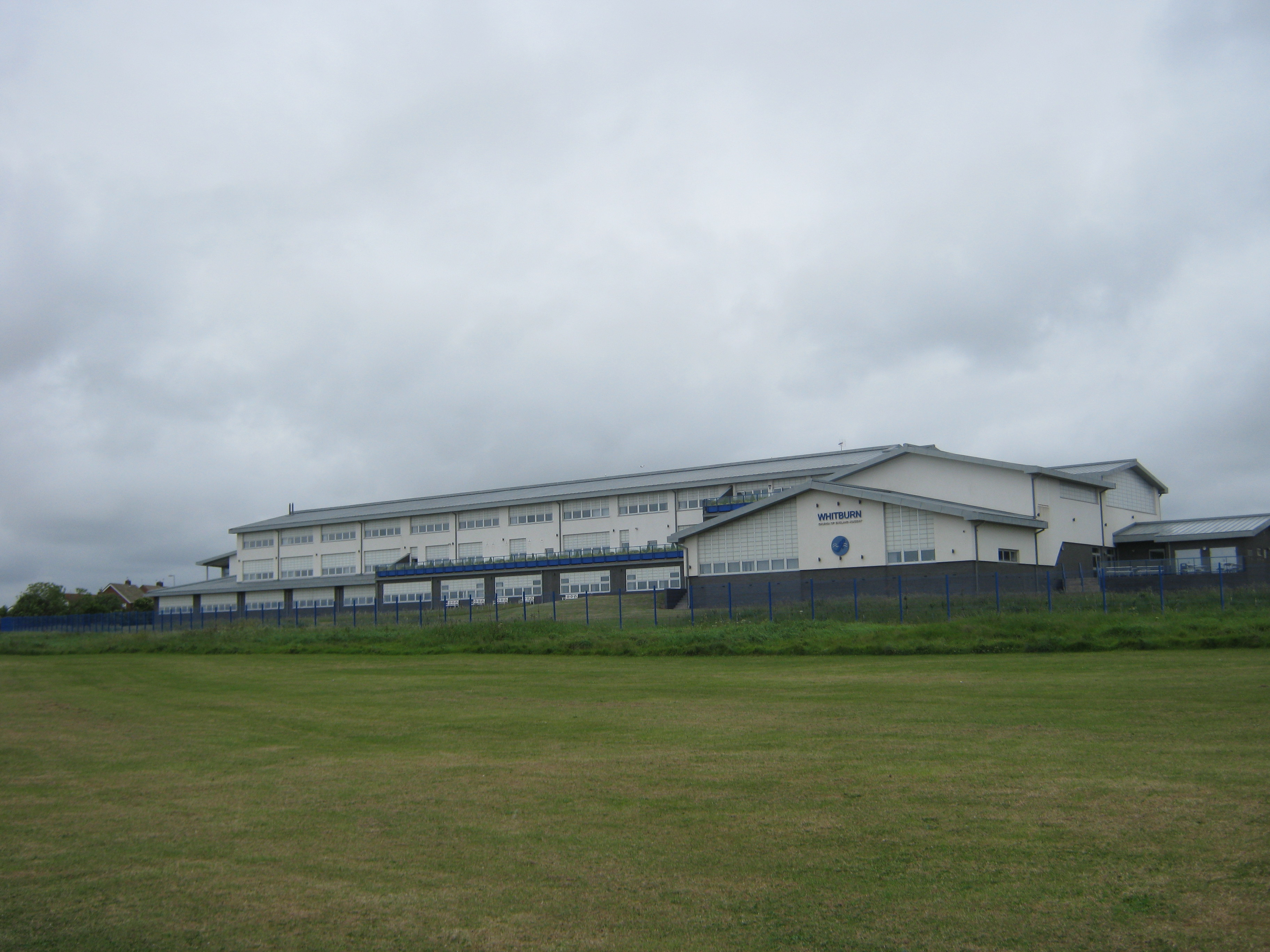

Location
- Rackley Way; Whitburn, South Tyneside, SR6 7EF; England; 54.94958°N 1.35963°W

Information
- Type: Academy
- Motto: Excellence for all
- Religious affiliation: Church Of England
- Department for Education URN: 136386 Tables
- Ofsted: Reports
- Head teacher: J Crowe
- Gender: Coeducational
- Age: 11 to 18
- Enrolment: 1228
- Houses: Lindisfarne, Tynemouth, Durham, Bamburgh, Boldon
- Colours: Yellow, Blue, Purple, Red, Green
- Website: whitburncofeacademy.org

Whitburn Church of England Academy or Whitburn CofE Academy is a coeducational secondary school and sixth form located in Whitburn, South Tyneside. Its motto is "Excellence for all". The academy was known as Whitburn Comprehensive School before moving and receiving major upgrades funded by the Church of England. It has specialist status in maths and computing and is a national teaching school.

== Sixth form ==
The academy has had plans to open a sixth form college for many years. Building work started in January 2015 and the building opened in September of the same year. The college teaches a wide variety of subjects across both STEM and humanities with good facilities for scientific practicals. School trips are fairly common, usually once a year including destinations like Germany, Alpe d'Huez, Malaysia and a trip is planned to Vietnam in 2027.

== Academic performance ==
The school performs well above the local authority average has held the best GCSE and AS/A level scores in South Tyneside. As of 2015, the school is listed as the second highest in Tyne and Wear

At GCSE in 2010, the school came first in the local authority area, above the England average. The school repeated the success in 2014. Ofsted has rated the school as outstanding

In 2016, 86% of pupils gained a grade C or above at GCSE level in English and Maths.

== Multi-academy trust ==
In October 2016, Whitburn expressed an interest in transitioning from single to multi-academy trust status. It later joined the PBTSA and Benedict Biscop Church of England Academy and Whitburn Church of England Academy were selected by the National College for Teaching and Leadership (NCTL) to play a leading role in Prince Bishops Teaching School Alliance.

== Notable Incidents ==
The Pink Chicken Burger Incident 22', likely due to a faulty delivery, a few students bit into their chicken burger only to see that it is pink and undercooked. Some students were put off the chicken burger after this incident, if the dryness didn't do so already.

The Sports Day Stampede 23', upon announcing the sports day winner of that year, students collectively broke the tape enclosing them into their respective spaces, they charged at the centre where the results were being announced. The sports day trophy was stolen and wasn't recovered until 30 minutes later. The following sports day winner announcement would then on be done so in the sports hall.
