= Jack Tresadern =

English footballer (1890–1959)

Personal information
- Full name: John Tresadern
- Date of birth: 26 September 1890
- Place of birth: Leytonstone, England
- Date of death: 26 September 1959 (aged 69)
- Place of death: Tonbridge, England
- Height: 5 ft 6 in (1.68 m)
- Position: Left-back

Senior career*
Years	Team	Apps	(Gls)
- Wanstead
- Southend United
–1913	Barking Town		
1913–1924	West Ham United	150	(5)
1924–1925	Burnley	22	(0)
1925–1926	Northampton Town	34	(1)

International career
1923	England	2	(0)

Managerial career
- 1926–1930: Northampton Town
- 1930–1935: Crystal Palace
- 1935–1938: Tottenham Hotspur
- 1938–1947: Plymouth Argyle
- 1949–1950: Chelmsford City
- 1951–?: Hastings United
- 1958–1959: Tonbridge
- * Club domestic league appearances and goals

John Tresadern (26 September 1890 – 26 September 1959) was an English professional football player and manager. He played twice for the England national team.

== Playing career ==
Tresadern, a left-half, began his career with non-league Wanstead, moving on to Southend United and then Barking Town before joining West Ham United in July 1913. He was part of the West Ham side elected to the Football League in 1919 and became a regular in their league side. Tresadern made his England debut in April 1923, in the 2–2 Home International draw with Scotland, although he was not pleased with his performance. "I was the best player Scotland had on the field", he said. He was part of the West Ham side that lost to Bolton Wanderers in the first ever FA Cup final to be held at Wembley. After just two minutes Tresadern became entangled in the crowd after taking a throw-in and was unable to return to the pitch immediately. This gave Bolton's David Jack the opportunity to shoot for goal; this shot beat West Ham goalkeeper Ted Hufton to give Bolton the lead, and hit a spectator who was standing pressed against the goal net, knocking him unconscious.

In October 1924, after 279 league games for the Hammers, Tresadern moved to Burnley. He played 22 league games for Burnley before joining Northampton Town as player-manager in May 1925.

== Coaching and managerial career ==
Tresadern retired from playing in December 1926 after breaking his leg. He continued as manager of Northampton until October 1930 when he became manager of Crystal Palace. In June 1935, he left Palace to manage Tottenham Hotspur, but had little success at White Hart Lane, resigning to take over at Plymouth Argyle in April 1938 rather than wait to be sacked. The war interrupted his time at Plymouth, but he remained at Home Park until November 1947.

The following year, he became a scout for Aston Villa before becoming manager of Chelmsford City in June 1949. He left Chelmsford in November 1950, and in December 1951, became manager of Hastings United.

He became manager of Tonbridge in April 1958 and remained in post until his death in September 1959 at the age of 69.

== Honours ==
West Ham United

- FA Cup runner-up: 1922–23
