= George Horler =

English footballer

Personal information
- Full name: George Henry Horler
- Date of birth: 10 February 1895
- Place of birth: Coleford, England
- Date of death: March 1967 (aged 72)
- Position: Full back

Senior career*
Years	Team	Apps	(Gls)
–1913	Coleford Athletic		
1913–	Frome Town		
–1922	Reading	56	(0)
1922–1927	West Ham United	47	(0)
1927–1928	Fulham	8	(0)
- Aldershot Town
- * Club domestic league appearances and goals

George Henry Horler (10 February 1895 – March 1967) was an English professional footballer who played as a full back in the Football League for Reading, West Ham United and Fulham.

== Personal life ==
Horler served as a sergeant in the Army Medical Corps during the First World War.

== Career statistics ==
Appearances and goals by club, season and competition
Club	Season	League			FA Cup		Total	
Club	Season	Division	Apps	Goals	Apps	Goals	Apps	Goals
West Ham United	1922–23	Second Division	5	0	2	0	7	0
West Ham United	1924–25	First Division	15	0	0	0	15	0
West Ham United	1925–26	First Division	5	0	0	0	5	0
West Ham United	1926–27	First Division	20	0	3	0	23	0
West Ham United	1927–28	First Division	2	0	―		2	0
West Ham United	Total		47	0	5	0	52	0
Fulham	1927–28	Second Division	8	0	1	0	9	0
Career total			55	0	6	0	61	0
