= 1922–23 FA Cup =

Tournament details
- Country: England; Wales

Final positions
- Champions: Bolton Wanderers (1st title)
- Runners-up: West Ham United

The 1922–23 FA Cup was the 48th season of the world's oldest association football competition, the Football Association Challenge Cup (more usually known as the FA Cup). Bolton Wanderers won the competition, beating West Ham United 2–0 in the first final to be held at Wembley Stadium, London.

Matches were scheduled to be played at the stadium of the team named first on the date specified for each round, which was always a Saturday. If scores were level after 90 minutes had been played, a replay would take place at the stadium of the second-named team later the same week. If the replayed match was drawn further replays would be held at neutral venues until a winner was determined. If scores were level after 90 minutes had been played in a replay, a 30-minute period of extra time would be played.

== Calendar ==
The format of the FA Cup for the season had two preliminary rounds, six qualifying rounds, four proper rounds, and the semi-finals and final.

Round	Date
Extra preliminary round	Saturday 9 September 1922
Preliminary round	Saturday 23 September 1922
First round qualifying	Saturday 7 October 1922
Second round qualifying	Saturday 21 October 1922
Third round qualifying	Saturday 4 November 1922
Fourth round qualifying	Saturday 18 November 1922
Fifth round qualifying	Saturday 2 December 1922
Sixth round qualifying	Saturday 16 December 1922
First round proper	Saturday 13 January 1923
Second round proper	Saturday 3 February 1923
Third round proper	Saturday 24 February 1923
Fourth round proper	Saturday 10 March 1923
Semi-finals	Saturday 24 March 1923
Final	Saturday 28 April 1923

== Qualifying rounds ==
Of the 35 Football League clubs required to enter this season's tournament in the qualifying rounds, only eight ended up progressing through to the competition proper. Three Second Division sides, Port Vale, Stockport County and Coventry City were entered in the fifth qualifying round, but all three lost at that stage (to Wrexham, Barrow and New Brighton respectively).

Twelve Third Division clubs (Durham City, Crewe Alexandra, Wigan Borough, Nelson, Rochdale, Halifax Town, Chesterfield, Lincoln City, Tranmere Rovers and Barrow from the North along with Southend United and Exeter City from the South) were entered in the fourth qualifying round, with Crewe and Tranmere going out to non-league opponents (New Brighton and Wellington St George's) and the rest either going on or losing amongst themselves.

A further 20 Third Division sides (Darlington, Ashington, Hartlepools United, Southport, Stalybridge Celtic, Accrington Stanley, Grimsby Town, Walsall and Wrexham from the North; and Norwich City, Charlton Athletic, Northampton Town, Gillingham, Brentford, Reading, Bristol Rovers, Aberdare Athletic, Newport County, Merthyr Town and Swansea Town from the South) were entered in the fifth qualifying round, of which 12 moved on to the next stage and eight went out.

The final 12 winners from the sixth qualifying round were Stalybridge Celtic, Aberdare Athletic, Wrexham, Merthyr Town, Charlton Athletic, Norwich City, Wigan Borough and Halifax Town from the Football League, and non-league sides Bath City, Worksop Town, Blyth Spartans and New Brighton. Those appearing in the competition proper for the first time were Aberdare Athletic, Charlton Athletic, Blyth Spartans, New Brighton, Stalybridge Celtic and Wigan Borough, although Celtic and Borough were emulating the achievements of defunct predecessor outfits Stalybridge Rovers in 1899-1900 and Wigan County in 1897-98.

Wellington St George's was the most successful team from this season's extra preliminary round. In addition to their victory against Tranmere, they secured wins over Shrewsbury Town, Bloxwich Strollers, Darlaston, Oswestry Town and Oakengates Town but went out to Walsall in the fifth qualifying round.

== First round proper ==
41 of 44 clubs from the Football League First and Second Divisions joined the 12 lower-league clubs who came through the qualifying rounds. To bring the number of teams up to 64, nine Third Division South sides and one Third Division North side were given byes to this round. These were:

- Watford
- Brighton & Hove Albion
- Luton Town
- Swindon Town
- Queens Park Rangers
- Millwall
- Plymouth Argyle
- Bristol City
- Portsmouth
- Bradford Park Avenue

The Football Association also began the custom of awarding leading London amateur club Corinthian a bye to the same stage of the tournament as the Football League First Division sides. Corinthian would receive these byes for a further ten seasons, but the club's members had to ratify a special constitutional amendment for it to do so as its founding document initially prevented it from competing for "any challenge cup or any prize of any description"!

32 matches were scheduled to be played on Saturday, 13 January 1923. Twelve matches were drawn and went to replays in the following midweek fixture, of which three went to another replay, and one match went to a third.

Tie no	Home team	Score	Away team	Date
1	Bristol City	5–1	Wrexham	13 January 1923
2	Bury	2–1	Luton Town	13 January 1923
3	Liverpool	0–0	Arsenal	13 January 1923
Replay	Arsenal	1–4	Liverpool	17 January 1923
4	South Shields	3–1	Halifax Town	13 January 1923
5	Leicester City	4–0	Fulham	13 January 1923
6	Nottingham Forest	0–0	Sheffield United	13 January 1923
Replay	Sheffield United	0–0	Nottingham Forest	17 January 1923
Replay	Nottingham Forest	1–1	Sheffield United	22 January 1923
Replay	Sheffield United	1–0	Nottingham Forest	23 January 1923
7	Aston Villa	0–1	Blackburn Rovers	13 January 1923
8	The Wednesday	3–0	New Brighton	13 January 1923
9	West Bromwich Albion	0–0	Stalybridge Celtic	13 January 1923
Replay	Stalybridge Celtic	0–2	West Bromwich Albion	17 January 1923
10	Sunderland	3–1	Burnley	13 January 1923
11	Derby County	2–0	Blackpool	13 January 1923
12	Everton	1–1	Bradford Park Avenue	13 January 1923
Replay	Bradford Park Avenue	1–0	Everton	17 January 1923
13	Swindon Town	0–0	Barnsley	13 January 1923
Replay	Barnsley	2–0	Swindon Town	18 January 1923
14	Newcastle United	0–0	Southampton	13 January 1923
Replay	Southampton	3–1	Newcastle United	17 January 1923
15	Tottenham Hotspur	0–0	Worksop Town	13 January 1923
Replay	Tottenham Hotspur	9–0	Worksop Town	15 January 1923
16	Manchester City	1–2	Charlton Athletic	13 January 1923
17	Queens Park Rangers	1–0	Crystal Palace	13 January 1923
18	Portsmouth	0–0	Leeds United	13 January 1923
Replay	Leeds United	3–1	Portsmouth	17 January 1923
19	Brighton & Hove Albion	1–1	Corinthian	13 January 1923
Replay	Corinthian	1–1	Brighton & Hove Albion	17 January 1923
Replay	Brighton & Hove Albion	1–0	Corinthian	22 January 1923
20	Norwich City	0–2	Bolton Wanderers	13 January 1923
21	Plymouth Argyle	0–0	Notts County	13 January 1923
Replay	Notts County	0–1	Plymouth Argyle	17 January 1923
22	Bradford City	1–1	Manchester United	13 January 1923
Replay	Manchester United	2–0	Bradford City	17 January 1923
23	Hull City	2–3	West Ham United	13 January 1923
24	Clapton Orient	0–2	Millwall	13 January 1923
25	Oldham Athletic	0–1	Middlesbrough	13 January 1923
26	Chelsea	1–0	Rotherham County	13 January 1923
27	Huddersfield Town	2–1	Birmingham	13 January 1923
28	Blyth Spartans	0–3	Stoke	13 January 1923
29	Cardiff City	1–1	Watford	13 January 1923
Replay	Watford	2–2	Cardiff City	17 January 1923
Replay	Cardiff City	2–1	Watford	22 January 1923
30	Merthyr Town	0–1	Wolverhampton Wanderers	13 January 1923
31	Aberdare Athletic	1–3	Preston North End	13 January 1923
32	Wigan Borough	4–1	Bath City	13 January 1923

== Second round proper ==
The 16 Second Round matches were played on Saturday, 3 February 1923. Five matches were drawn, with replays taking place in the following midweek fixture.

Tie no	Home team	Score	Away team	Date
1	Bristol City	0–3	Derby County	3 February 1923
2	Bury	3–1	Stoke	3 February 1923
3	South Shields	0–0	Blackburn Rovers	3 February 1923
Replay	Blackburn Rovers	0–1	South Shields	7 February 1923
4	Leicester City	0–1	Cardiff City	3 February 1923
5	The Wednesday	2–1	Barnsley	3 February 1923
6	Bolton Wanderers	3–1	Leeds United	3 February 1923
7	Wolverhampton Wanderers	0–2	Liverpool	3 February 1923
8	Middlesbrough	1–1	Sheffield United	3 February 1923
Replay	Sheffield United	3–0	Middlesbrough	8 February 1923
9	West Bromwich Albion	2–1	Sunderland	3 February 1923
10	Tottenham Hotspur	4–0	Manchester United	3 February 1923
11	Brighton & Hove Albion	1–1	West Ham United	3 February 1923
Replay	West Ham United	1–0	Brighton & Hove Albion	7 February 1923
12	Plymouth Argyle	4–1	Bradford Park Avenue	3 February 1923
13	Millwall	0–0	Huddersfield Town	3 February 1923
Replay	Huddersfield Town	3–0	Millwall	7 February 1923
14	Chelsea	0–0	Southampton	3 February 1923
Replay	Southampton	1–0	Chelsea	7 February 1923
15	Charlton Athletic	2–0	Preston North End	3 February 1923
16	Wigan Borough	2–4	Queens Park Rangers	3 February 1923

== Third round proper ==
The eight Third Round matches were scheduled for Saturday, 24 February 1923. Two matches were drawn and went to replays in the following midweek fixture.

Tie no	Home team	Score	Away team	Date
1	Bury	0–0	Southampton	24 February 1923
Replay	Southampton	1–0	Bury	28 February 1923
2	Liverpool	1–2	Sheffield United	24 February 1923
3	Derby County	1–0	The Wednesday	24 February 1923
4	Queens Park Rangers	3–0	South Shields	24 February 1923
5	West Ham United	2–0	Plymouth Argyle	24 February 1923
6	Huddersfield Town	1–1	Bolton Wanderers	24 February 1923
Replay	Bolton Wanderers	1–0	Huddersfield Town	28 February 1923
7	Cardiff City	2–3	Tottenham Hotspur	24 February 1923
8	Charlton Athletic	1–0	West Bromwich Albion	24 February 1923

== Fourth round proper ==
The four Fourth round matches were scheduled for Saturday, 10 March 1923. There was one replay, between Southampton and West Ham United, played in the following midweek fixture. However, this went to a second replay, which West Ham won.

Tie no	Home team	Score	Away team	Date
1	Southampton	1–1	West Ham United	10 March 1923
Replay	West Ham United	1–1	Southampton	14 March 1923
Replay	West Ham United	1–0	Southampton	19 March 1923
2	Tottenham Hotspur	0–1	Derby County	10 March 1923
3	Queens Park Rangers	0–1	Sheffield United	10 March 1923
4	Charlton Athletic	0–1	Bolton Wanderers	10 March 1923

== Semi-finals ==
The semi-final matches were played on Saturday, 24 March 1923. The matches ended in victories for Bolton Wanderers and West Ham United, who went on to meet in the final at Wembley.

24 March 1923
15:00

Bolton Wanderers	1–0	Sheffield United

Old Trafford, Manchester

24 March 1923
15:00

West Ham United	5–2	Derby County

Stamford Bridge, London

== Final ==
The final was held on 28 April 1923 at the original Wembley Stadium in London. It was the first football match to be played at the newly built stadium. King George V was in attendance to present the trophy to the winning team. Bolton Wanderers won the match 2–0, through goals from David Jack and Jack Smith.

The 1923 final later became widely known as the "White Horse Final" because of the famous image of mounted policeman George Scorey on a white horse helping control the overcrowded spectators around the pitch at Wembley Stadium. The match played an important role in shaping future crowd-control and stadium safety arrangements for major football events in England.

=== Match details ===
28 April 1923

Bolton Wanderers	2–0	West Ham United
Jack 2'; Jack Smith 53'	(Report)

Wembley Stadium, London
Attendance: 126,047 (officially)
Referee: D. H. Asson (West Bromwich)

Bolton Wanderers	West Ham United

== See also ==
- FA Cup Final Results 1872-
