= History of Bolton Wanderers F.C. =

History of an English football club

The history of Bolton Wanderers Football Club covers the period from its founding in 1874 up to the present. For a general overview of the club itself, see Bolton Wanderers F.C.

== Early history (1874–1929) ==
Chart showing the progress of Bolton Wanderers F.C. through the English football league system from the inaugural season in 1888–89 to the present time

Bolton Wanderers was founded by the Reverend Thomas Ogden, the schoolmaster at Christ Church in June 1874 as "Christ Church F.C." It was initially run from the church of the same name on Deane Road, Bolton, on the site where the Innovation factory of the University of Bolton now stands. The vicar would not allow meetings at the church in his absence so the club left the location and changed its name to "Bolton Wanderers" in August 1877. The name was chosen as the club initially had significant difficulty finding a permanent ground to play on, having used three venues in its first four years of existence.

There then followed two drawn matches (with Roberts again scoring in the first), before Everton won the second replay (the fourth match altogether) 2–1. This time, however, Everton were disqualified for fielding two professional players who had been registered as amateurs, and the match was awarded to Bolton, who then suffered a club record 9–1 defeat in the second round away to Preston North End.

Bolton were one of the 12 founder members of the Football League, which was formed in 1888. Bolton have played more seasons than any other club in the top flight without winning the league title.

In 1894 Bolton reached the final of the FA Cup for the first time, but lost 4–1 to Notts County at Goodison Park. A decade later they were runners-up a second time, losing 1–0 to local rivals Manchester City at Crystal Palace on 23 April 1904.

The period before and after the First World War was Bolton's most consistent period of top-flight success as measured by league finishes, with the club finishing outside the top 8 of the First Division on only two occasions between 1911–12 and 1927–28. In this period Bolton equalled their record finish of third twice, in 1920–21 and 1924–25, on the latter occasion missing out on the title by just 3 points (in an era of 2 points for a win).

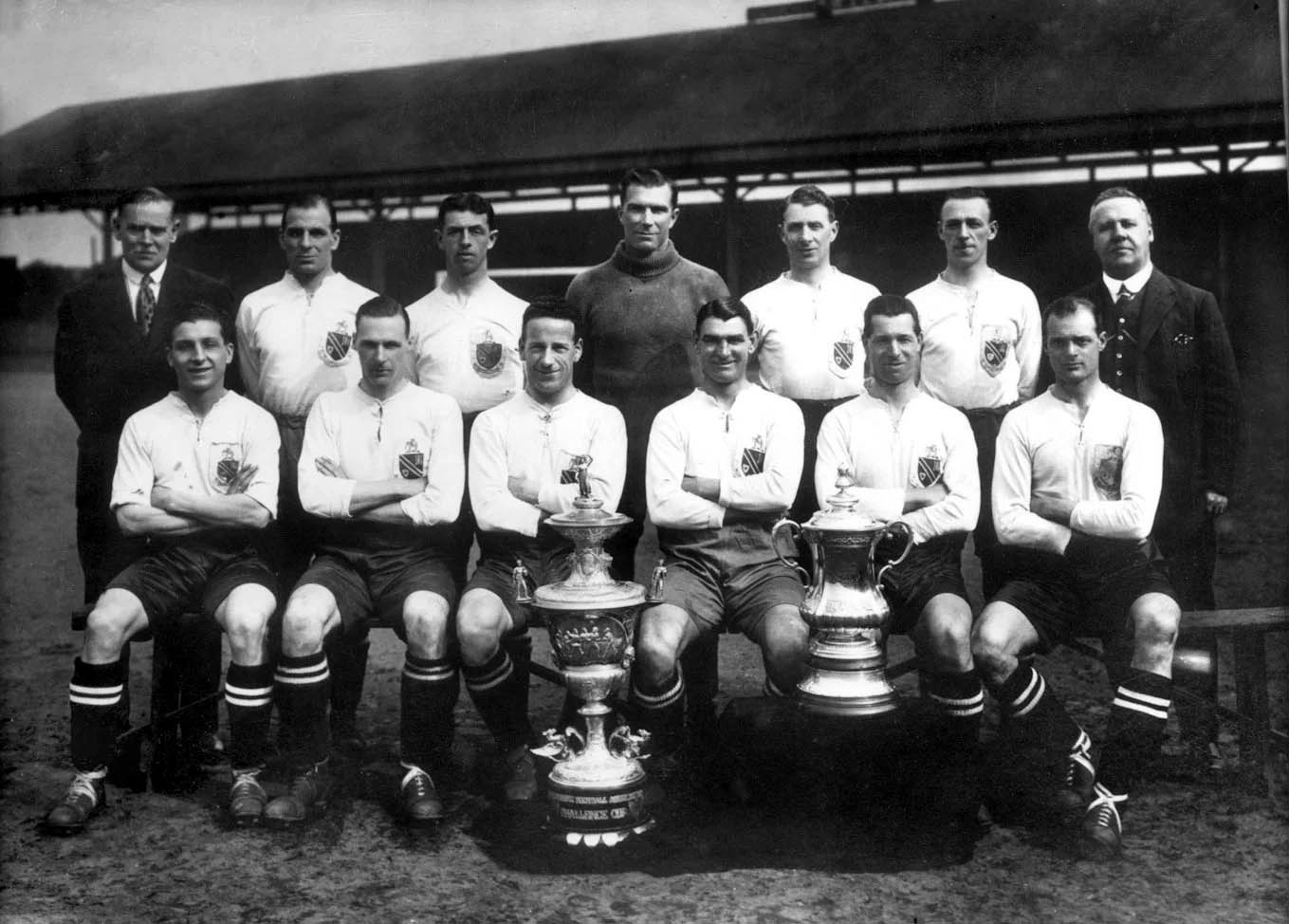
Players of Bolton Wanderers posing with the two trophies won in 1926. The FA Cup is at right

On 28 April 1923, Bolton won the cup at their third attempt to win their first major trophy, beating West Ham United 2–0 in the first ever Wembley final. The match, famously known as The White Horse Final was played in front of over 127,000 supporters. Bolton's centre-forward, David Jack scored the first ever goal at Wembley Stadium. Driven by long-term players Joe Smith in attack, Ted Vizard and Billy Butler on the wings, and Jimmy Seddon in defence, they became the most successful cup side of the 1920s, also winning in 1926 and 1929, beating Manchester City and Portsmouth respectively.

== Top flight run and cup success (1929–1958) ==
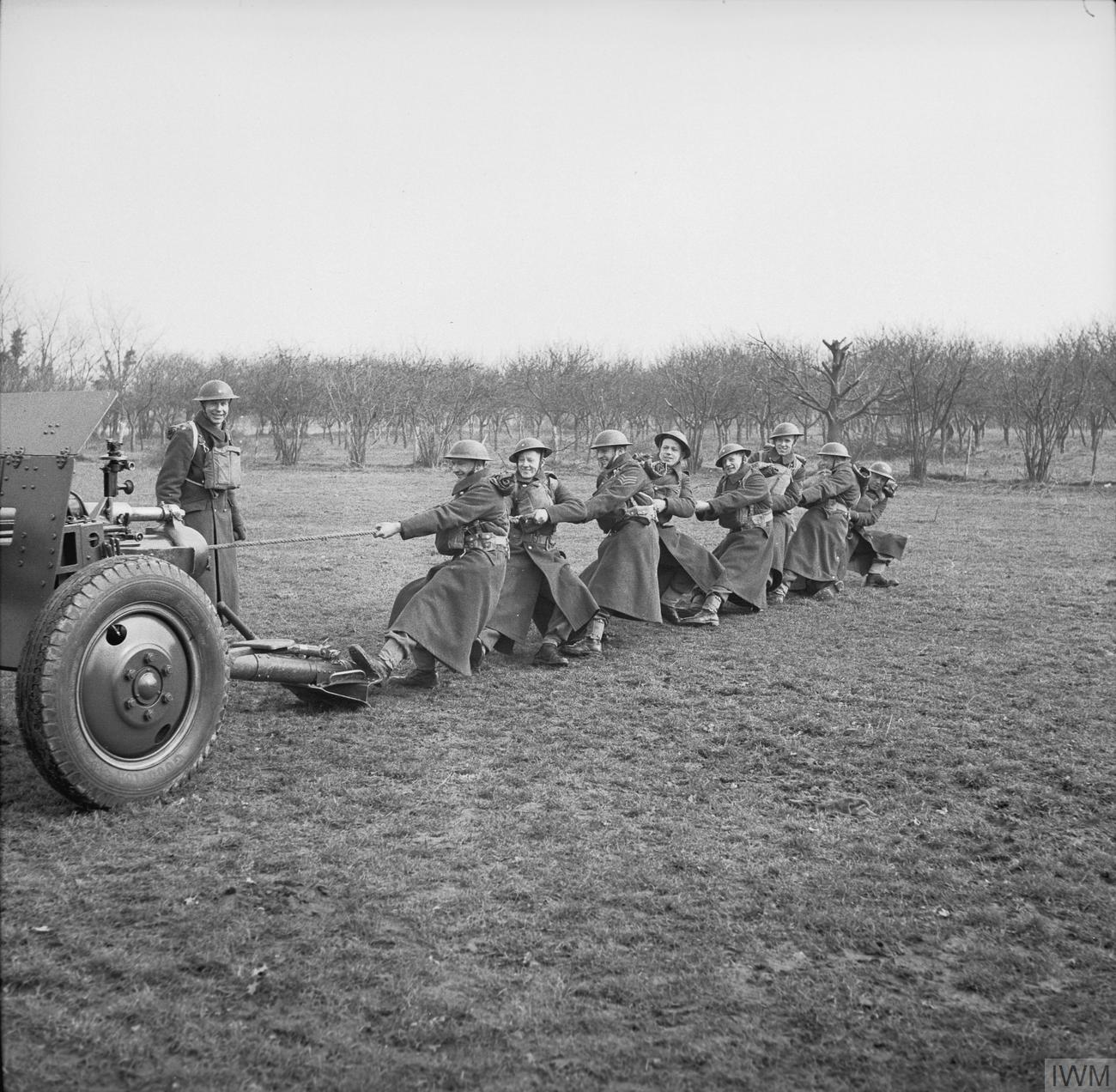
Men from Bolton Wanderers Football Club serving together with a battery of artillery in the 53rd (Bolton) Field Regiment, Royal Artillery, of the 42nd (East Lancashire) Infantry Division, at Beccles, Suffolk on the east coast of England. The photograph, pictured sometime in 1940, shows the nine footballers in uniform pulling an artillery piece.

From 1935 to 1964, Bolton enjoyed an uninterrupted stay in the top flight – regarded by fans as a golden era – spearheaded in the 1950s by Nat Lofthouse. World War II saw most of the Wanderers' playing staff see action on the front, a rare occurrence within elite football, as top sides' players were generally assigned to physical training assignments, away from enemy fire. As it is, no less than 15 Bolton professionals, led by their captain Harry Goslin, volunteered for active service in 1939 and were enlisted in the 53rd Bolton Artillery regiment. By the end of the War, 32 of the 35 pre-war professionals saw action in the British forces. The sole fatality was Goslin, who had by then risen to the rank of Lieutenant and was killed by shrapnel on the Italian front shortly before Christmas 1943. 53rd Bolton Artillery took part in the Battle of Dunkirk and also served in the campaigns of Egypt, Iraq and Italy. Remarkably, a number of these soldiers managed to carry on playing the game in these theatres of war, taking on as "British XI" various scratch teams assembled by, among others, King Faruk of Egypt in Cairo and Polish forces in Baghdad.

On 9 March 1946, the club's home was the scene of the Burnden Park disaster, which at the time was the worst tragedy in British football history. Thirty-three Bolton fans were crushed to death, and another 400 injured, in an FA Cup quarter-final second leg tie between Bolton and Stoke City. There was an estimated 85,000 strong crowd crammed in for the game, at least 15,000 over-capacity. The disaster led to Moelwyn Hughes's official report, which recommended more rigorous control of crowd sizes.

In 1953, Bolton played in one of the most famous FA Cup finals of all time – The Stanley Matthews Final of 1953. Bolton lost the game to Blackpool 4–3 after gaining a 3–1 lead. Blackpool were victorious thanks to the skills of Stanley Matthews and the goals of Stan Mortensen.

Bolton have not won a major trophy since 1958, when two Lofthouse goals saw them overcome Manchester United in the FA Cup final in front of a 100,000 crowd at Wembley Stadium. The closest they have come to winning a major trophy since then is finishing runners-up in the League Cup, first in 1995 and again in 2004.

== Few highs and many lows (1958–1995) ==
Hopes were high at Burnden Park in May 1978 when Bolton sealed the Second Division title and gained promotion to the First Division. However, they only remained there for two seasons before being relegated.

Following relegation in 1980, Bolton signed former Manchester United European Cup-winning striker Brian Kidd from Everton for £110,000 as they prepared to challenge for a quick return to the First Division. Kidd scored a hat-trick in his third game for Bolton, a 4–0 win over Newcastle United in the league, but the rest of the season was a struggle as Bolton failed to finish anywhere near the promotion places. Manager Stan Anderson was sacked at end of the season and replaced by coach George Mulhall. By the end of the 1981–82 season, Bolton were no closer to promotion and had lost several key players including Peter Reid and Neil Whatmore. There were then rumours that Brazilian legend Pelé would be appointed to take over from George Mulhall as manager, but the job went to John McGovern (a European Cup winner with Nottingham Forest) who became Bolton's first player-manager.

The appointment of McGovern as manager, however, was not the turning point that everyone at Burnden Park had hoped it would be, and in 1983 Bolton were relegated to the Third Division after losing 4–1 at Charlton Athletic on the final day of the season.

McGovern remained in charge for the 1983–84 season, and for a while it looked as though he was the man to turn things around as his predominantly young team did well in the Third Division. An 8–1 win over Walsall that season was Bolton's best league win for 50 years, but in the end Bolton failed to win promotion. McGovern then made way for new manager Charlie Wright, who remained in charge until December 1985.

At the end of the 1986–87 season, Bolton suffered relegation to the Fourth Division for the first time in their history. But the board kept faith in manager Phil Neal (who was appointed in December 1985) and they won promotion back to the Third Division at the first attempt. The deciding goal was scored by Robbie Savage in a thrilling 1–0 win at Wrexham. Wrexham missed a penalty in the opening 30 minutes and both teams squandered a succession of chances. Bolton's Savage hit the post from a free-kick before the referee blew the final whistle. It was during Neal's reign at manager that Nat Lofthouse was appointed lifetime President of the football club. Neal won the Sherpa Van Trophy in 1989 and remained in charge until the summer of 1992 when he made way for Bruce Rioch, who a few years earlier had won two successive promotions with Middlesbrough. His penultimate season (1990–91) saw Bolton pipped to the final automatic promotion place by Southend United and lose to Tranmere Rovers in the playoff final, but his final season saw them finish a disappointing 13th.

In the early part of Rioch's tenure, Bolton gained a giantkilling reputation in cup competitions. In 1993, Bolton beat FA Cup holders Liverpool 2–0 in a third round replay at Anfield thanks to goals from John McGinlay and Andy Walker. The club also defeated higher division opposition in the form of Wolverhampton Wanderers (2–1) that year before bowing out to Derby County (3–1). Bolton also secured promotion to the second tier for the first time since 1983. In 1994, Bolton beat FA Cup holders Arsenal 3–1 after extra time in a fourth round replay, and went on to reach the quarter-finals, bowing out 1–0 at home to local rivals (and then Premier League) Oldham Athletic. Bolton also defeated top division opposition in the form of Everton (3–2) and Aston Villa (1–0) that year.

== Colin Todd era (1995–1999) ==
Bolton reached the Premiership in 1995 under the management of Rioch, thanks to a victory over Reading in the Division One playoff final. Rioch, who also led Bolton to the League Cup Final in 1995, a 2–1 defeat by Liverpool, left to take charge at Arsenal after the promotion success and was replaced by Roy McFarland, who was joined by Rioch's assistant Colin Todd as joint manager. Bolton were bottom for virtually all of the 1995–96 Premiership campaign and Bolton dismissed McFarland on New Year's Day 1996 and appointed Todd in his place. Todd was unable to save Bolton from relegation as they lost their penultimate game 1–0 to Southampton, but the Bolton board kept faith in him. The board's loyalty in Todd was rewarded when they won promotion back to the Premiership at the first attempt thanks to a season in which they achieved 98 league points and 100 goals in the process of securing the Division One championship, the first time since 1978 that they had finished top of any division. This season also marked the club's departure from Burnden Park to the Reebok Stadium, the last game at the stadium being a 4–1 win over Charlton. John McGinlay scored the final goal at Burnden Park.

Bolton were relegated on goal difference at the end of the 1997–98 Premiership campaign. Bolton reached the 1999 Division One playoff final but lost 2–0 to Watford. Todd resigned as manager the following autumn and was replaced by Sam Allardyce.

== Sam Allardyce era (1999–2007) ==
Bolton reached the semi-finals of the FA Cup, Worthington Cup and play-offs but lost to Aston Villa, Tranmere Rovers and Ipswich Town respectively. In 2000–01, Bolton were promoted back to the Premier League after beating Preston North End 3–0 in the play-off final.

Bolton struggled in the following two seasons, but survived in the Premier League. The 2001–02 season began with a shock as they destroyed Leicester City 5–0 at Filbert Street to go top of the table. Despite a memorable 2–1 win away at Manchester United, becoming the first team since the formation of the Premier League to come from behind and win a league game at Old Trafford, they went into a deep slump during the middle of the season and needed a Fredi Bobic hat-trick against Ipswich to survive. Despite losing the final three games, 16th place was secured. The arrivals of experienced international players Bobic and Youri Djorkaeff proved vital, as did the emergence of Kevin Nolan and Michael Ricketts.

In the 2002–03 season, Bolton made a poor start and, despite another win away at Manchester United, they were bottom until a vital and spectacular 4–2 win against Leeds United at Elland Road. Despite suffering from a lack of consistency, Bolton ground out the results needed and secured survival in a final day 2–1 victory over Middlesbrough. The star of the season, Jay-Jay Okocha, was another high-profile signing and went on to be a legend at the Reebok Stadium.

Bolton reached the League Cup final in 2004, but lost to Middlesbrough. Nevertheless, Bolton finished eighth in the league, at the time their highest finish in their Premiership history. In 2005, Bolton finished sixth in the league, thus earning qualification for the UEFA Cup for the first time in their history. The following season, they reached the last 32 but were eliminated by French side Marseille as they lost 2–1 on aggregate. In April 2007, towards the end of 2006–07 season, manager Allardyce resigned. In his final four seasons at Bolton, Allardyce had recorded consecutive top ten finishes, a record of consistency bettered only by the big four of Chelsea, Manchester United, Liverpool and Arsenal. However, the style that the media branded Bolton as playing during this time led them to be voted the seventh most-hated club in English football in a 2008 poll.

== Gary Megson era (2007–2009) ==
Allardyce was replaced by his assistant Sammy Lee, who secured Bolton's qualification for the 2007–08 UEFA Cup. After gaining only 1 league win in 11 matches, Lee left Bolton in October 2007 and was replaced by Gary Megson. Megson set about making changes to the squad and accepted a £15 million bid from Chelsea for Nicolas Anelka, using the money to rebuild the squad signing Tamir Cohen, Grétar Steinsson, Matthew Taylor and Gary Cahill.

Megson guided Bolton to survival with a 16th-place finish, their safety being confirmed on the final day of the season, as they went on an unbeaten run for their final five games, as well as taking them to the last sixteen of the UEFA Cup. During the European run, Bolton gained a famous draw at former European champions Bayern Munich as well as becoming the first British team to beat Red Star Belgrade in Belgrade. They also defeated Atlético Madrid on aggregate before being knocked out by Sporting CP.

The new manager broke Bolton's record transfer fee with the signing of Johan Elmander from Toulouse on 27 June 2008, in a deal which cost the club a reported £8.2 million and saw Norwegian striker Daniel Braaten head in the opposite direction. Bolton's season started slowly, winning their opening game against Stoke City 3–1 then going on a run of five games without a win. November was undoubtedly their best month with four wins from their five games, losing only to Liverpool. January saw former fan favourite Kevin Nolan leave the club to relegation bound Newcastle United in a £4 million deal, with Mark Davies and Sébastien Puygrenier the only positive signings coming in. Tensions soon began to build between supporters and Megson after he branded them "pathetic". This tension was key factor in his eventual sacking. Mixed results across the rest of the season left Bolton flirting with relegation but they finally finished 13th on 41 points.

Over the summer, Megson signed Sean Davis, Lee Chung-yong, Zat Knight, Paul Robinson (on-loan from West Bromwich Albion) and Ivan Klasnić (on loan from Nantes). The 2009–10 season started where the last one was headed, with only four wins from their opening 18 fixtures, notable losses including a 0–2 home loss to Blackburn Rovers and a 1–5 drubbing at Aston Villa.

On 30 December 2009, Bolton announced that Megson had been sacked by the club due to a run of poor performances. His last game in charge, the night before his sacking, was a 2–2 draw at home to Hull City after letting slip a 2–0 lead. On 8 January 2010, former player Owen Coyle was announced as Megson's replacement as manager.

== Owen Coyle era (2010–2012) ==
Coyle marked his first game in charge with a 2–0 defeat to Arsenal, but won his next home match against former employers Burnley. During the January transfer window, Coyle strengthened the squad with a free transfer for Stuart Holden from Houston Dynamo as well as loan signings in Jack Wilshere from Arsenal and Vladimír Weiss from Manchester City. Coyle steered Bolton to survival as they finished 14th with 39 points, while his old club went down with 30 points. This secured a tenth successive top flight campaign for Bolton.

During the summer, Coyle bolstered the ranks by signing Martin Petrov and Robbie Blake on free deals from Manchester City and Burnley respectively. Also signed were Marcos Alonso for an undisclosed fee from Real Madrid, Ivan Klasnić on a free transfer from Nantes, Tom Eaves from Oldham Athletic for an undisclosed fee and Rodrigo on loan from Benfica.

On 10 November 2010, the club announced a loss of £35.4 million for the year ending 30 June 2010, with debt increasing to £93 million.

During the January transfer window, Coyle signed David Wheater from Middlesbrough for £2.3 million and Daniel Sturridge from Chelsea on loan until the end of the season.

In the 2010–11 FA Cup, Bolton defeated York City, Wigan Athletic, Fulham and Birmingham City en route to the semi-finals, but were beaten 5–0 by Stoke City at Wembley with the match being described as "a massive anti-climax". Bolton gained revenge for this defeat when they beat Stoke 5–0 at home the following season on 6 November 2011. The club spent most of the season in the top half of the table, but a run of five consecutive defeats at the end of the season resulted in them finishing in 14th place.

In the summer of 2011, Coyle released several players, including Johan Elmander, Tamir Cohen, Joey O'Brien and Jlloyd Samuel, as well as selling goalkeeper Ali Al Habsi to Wigan for a fee believed to be £4 million. Also, Danny Ward and Matthew Taylor were sold to Huddersfield Town and West Ham respectively for undisclosed fees. Coyle signed Darren Pratley and Nigel Reo-Coker on free transfers, Chris Eagles and Tyrone Mears from his former club Burnley for a joint fee in the region of £3 million and Tuncay and Dedryck Boyata on loan from VfL Wolfsburg and Manchester City respectively. On transfer deadline day, Bolton completed the signing of David Ngog from Liverpool, and the loan of Gaël Kakuta from Chelsea. Bolton, however, started the season with just one win and six defeats, their worse start since the 1902–03 season when they were relegated. Their form then picked up towards the half-way point of the season and in January they climbed out of the relegation zone. During that month's transfer window, the club received their second-highest ever transfer fee when England defender Gary Cahill was sold to Chelsea for £7 million. Bolton used some of this money to bring in defender Tim Ream from the New York Red Bulls and forward Marvin Sordell from Watford, as well as the loan of Japanese midfielder Ryo Miyaichi from Arsenal for the rest of the season.

On 17 March 2012, Coyle travelled to the London Chest Hospital with Fabrice Muamba who had suffered from a cardiac arrest while playing against Tottenham Hotspur at White Hart Lane in an FA Cup match. Muamba stayed in a critical condition and Coyle has now pleaded for the most support possible around the country for Muamba.

On 13 May 2012, Bolton were relegated from the Premiership by one point on the last day of the season after drawing 2–2 with Stoke. In the aftermath of relegation, chairman Phil Gartside revealed the intention to cut the wage bill by half to ease financial concerns surrounding the club. Striker Ivan Klasnić and defender Mark Connolly were the first to leave the club.

On 9 October 2012, Bolton announced that Coyle had been relieved of his duties as manager after a dismal start to the Championship season, leaving the club in 18th position going into the second international break of the season. Following his sacking, Jimmy Phillips and Sammy Lee were put in temporary charge of the first team.

== Dougie Freedman, Neil Lennon, Phil Parkinson era (2012–present) ==
On 23 October 2012, Crystal Palace released a statement confirming that first team manager Dougie Freedman had joined Bolton. However, nothing had yet been confirmed by Bolton, with their caretaker manager Jimmy Phillips stating on 24 October that negotiations were still to be concluded. On 25 October, however, Bolton confirmed that Dougie Freedman had signed a three-year deal to become the club's next manager.

Freedman's first game in charge was a 2–1 victory over Cardiff City at the Reebok Stadium, where goals by Martin Petrov and David Ngog secured the win. Freedman added to both his coaching and player options within the first fortnight of his tenure, with experienced coach Lennie Lawrence and former Palace teammate Curtis Fleming joining the Bolton staff. His first addition on the playing squad since taking over was that of the one-month loan signing of Norwich City midfielder Jacob Butterfield. His first permanent signing as Bolton boss was Craig Davies from Barnsley in early January 2013. This was followed by the signing of Craig Dawson on loan from West Brom on 24 January 2013, despite Blackburn Rovers, Leicester City, Leeds United and Nottingham Forest all also having loan bids accepted. Additionally, he brought in midfielders Medo Kamara on a permanent basis from Partizan and Steve De Ridder on loan from Southampton within his first transfer window as Bolton manager.

Freedman was sacked at the beginning of the 2014–2015 season and was replaced by former Celtic manager Neil Lennon. Bolton were handed a winding up petition HM Revenue and Customs over unpaid taxes in December 2015 and a transfer embargo. However, things improved when Dean Holdsworth's sport shield consortium took over the club in March 2016. Lennon left the club the following month to be replaced by Academy manager Jimmy Phillips.

Bolton were relegated at the end of that season to third tier for the first time since 1993.

Under new manager Phil Parkinson, Bolton won promotion from League One at the first time of asking with a second-place finish. However they were relegated back to the third tier at the end of the 2018–19 season and were suffering severe financial problems.
