= 1929 FA Cup final =

1929 FA Cup Final
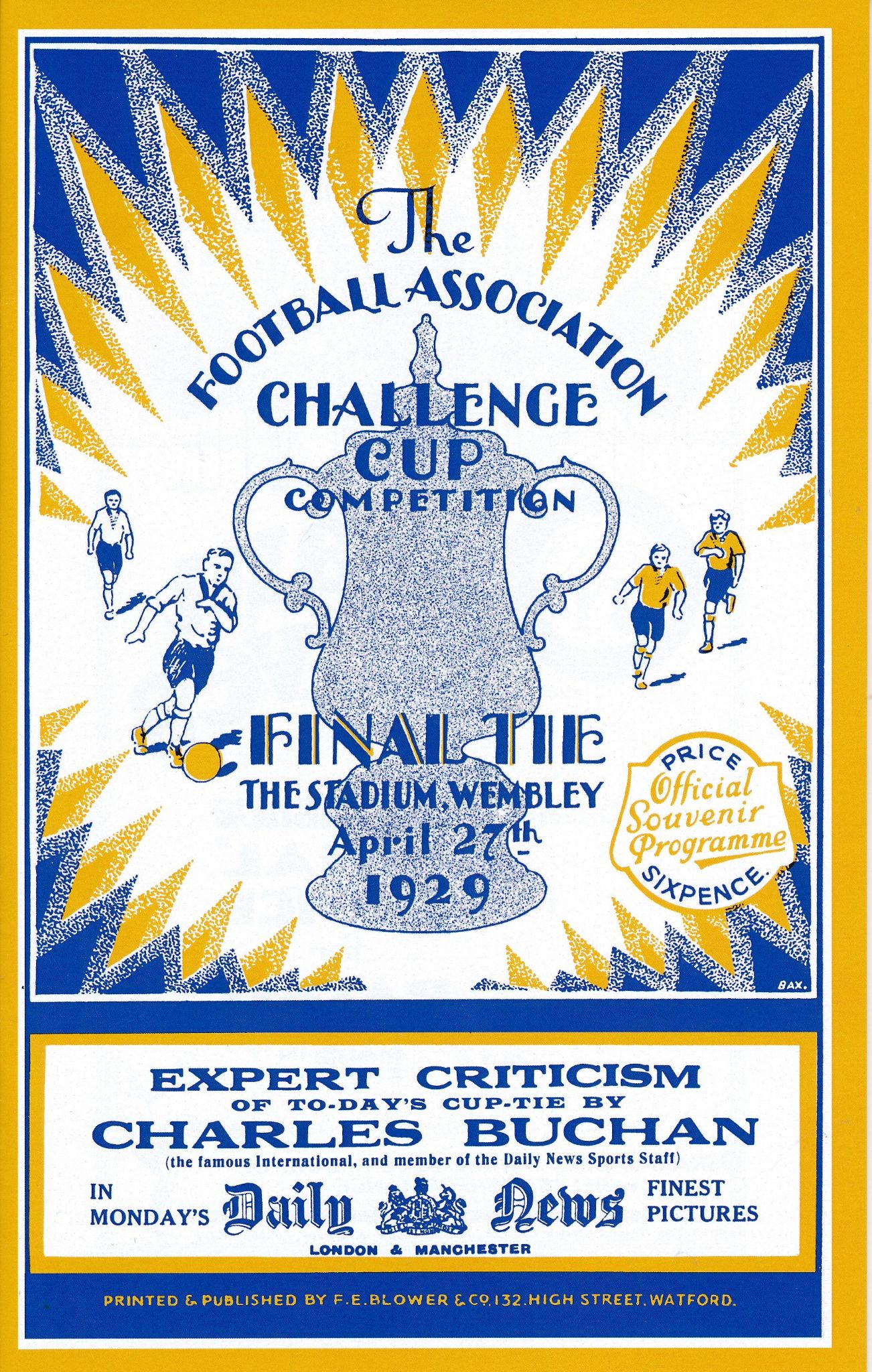
- Programme cover
- Event: 1928–29 FA Cup
Bolton Wanderers	Portsmouth
2	0
- Date: 27 April 1929
- Venue: Wembley Stadium, London
- Referee: A. Josephs (South Shields)
- Attendance: 92,576

The 1929 FA Cup final was an association football match between Bolton Wanderers and Portsmouth on 27 April 1929 at Wembley Stadium.

== Match details ==
Bolton won 2–0, with goals by Billy Butler and Harold Blackmore. It marked the 54th final of the Football Association Challenge Cup (FA Cup), the world's oldest football cup competition. It was Portsmouth's first FA Cup final and Bolton's fifth. En route to the final, Bolton defeated Oldham Athletic, Liverpool (after a replay), Leicester City, Blackburn Rovers (after a replay) and Huddersfield Town; Portsmouth beat Charlton Athletic, Bradford City, Chelsea (after a replay), West Ham United and Aston Villa.

The match was played in a front of 92,576 spectators and was refereed by Arnold Josephs. After a goalless first half, two late goals in the second half from Billy Butler and Harold Blackmore secured Bolton the FA Cup. For Bolton this meant that they had won their third FA Cup title.

No live radio commentary of the match was broadcast by the BBC, as permission to do so had been refused by the Football Association. Instead, the organisation sent various reporters to the ground, who each left the match at 15-to-20-minute intervals to go to a nearby house where a broadcasting set-up had been arranged. From there, they transmitted accounts of the game as they had seen it up to the point of their departure.

== Road to the Final ==
=== Bolton Wanderers ===
Round	Team #1	Score	Team #2
3	Bolton Wanderers	2–0	Oldham Athletic
4	Liverpool	0–0	Bolton Wanderers
Replay	Bolton Wanderers	5–2	Liverpool
5	Leicester City	1–2	Bolton Wanderers
6	Blackburn Rovers	1–1	Bolton Wanderers
Replay	Bolton Wanderers	2–1	Blackburn Rovers
Semi-Final	Bolton Wanderers	3–1	Huddersfield Town

=== Portsmouth ===
Round	Team #1	Score	Team #2
3	Portsmouth	2–1	Charlton Athletic
4	Portsmouth	2–1	Bradford City
5	Chelsea	1–1	Portsmouth
Replay	Portsmouth	1–0	Chelsea
6	Portsmouth	3–2	West Ham United
Semi-Final	Portsmouth	1–0	Aston Villa

== Match details ==
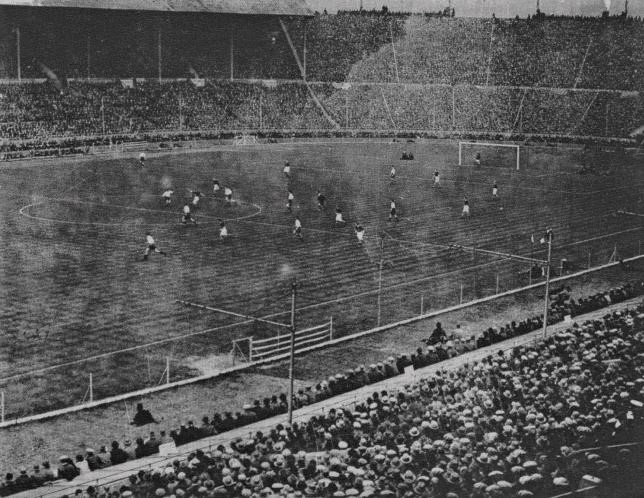
A moment of the match

27 April 1929
15:00 BST

Bolton Wanderers	2–0	Portsmouth
Butler 79'; Blackmore 87'	Report

Wembley Stadium, London
Attendance: 92,576
Referee: Arnold Josephs (South Shields)

Bolton Wanderers	Portsmouth

GK	(England) Dick Pym
DF	(England) Bob Haworth
DF	(England) Alex Finney
MF	(England) Fred Kean
MF	(England) Jimmy Seddon (c)
MF	(England) Harry Nuttall
FW	(England) Billy Butler
FW	(Scotland) Jim McClelland
FW	(England) Harold Blackmore
FW	(Scotland) George Gibson
FW	(Scotland) Willie Cook
Manager:
(England) Charles Foweraker

GK	(Scotland) Jock Gilfillan
DF	(Northern Ireland) Alec Mackie
DF	(England) Thomas Bell
MF	(Scotland) Jimmy Nichol
MF	(Scotland) Johnny McIlwaine (c)
MF	(Scotland) David Thackeray
FW	(England) Fred Forward
FW	(England) Jack Smith
FW	(England) Jack Weddle
FW	(England) David Watson
FW	(Wales) Fred Cook
Manager:
(England) Jack Tinn

Match rules

- 90 minutes.
- 30 minutes of extra-time if necessary.
- Replay if scores still level.
