= 1926 FA Cup final =

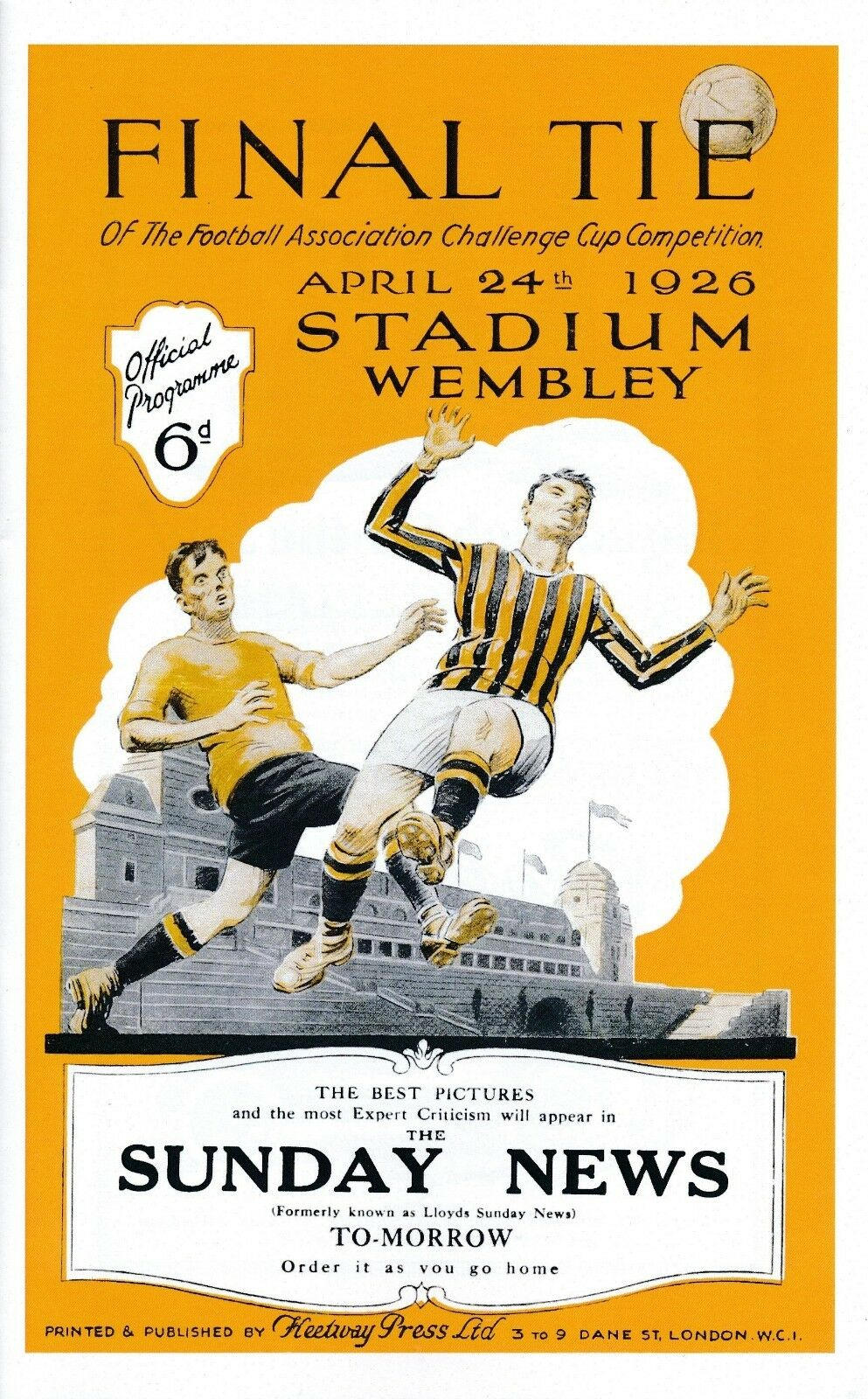
- Official programme
- Event: 1925–26 FA Cup
Bolton Wanderers	Manchester City
1	0
- Date: 24 April 1926
- Venue: Wembley Stadium, London
- Referee: I. Baker
- Attendance: 91,447

The 1926 FA Cup final was a football match between Bolton Wanderers and Manchester City on 24 April 1926 at Wembley Stadium in London. The showpiece match of English football's primary cup competition, the Football Association Challenge Cup (better known as the FA Cup), it was the 55th final, and the fourth at Wembley.

Each team progressed through five rounds to reach the final. Both teams were members of the Football League First Division, Bolton Wanderers occupying a position in upper-mid-table and Manchester City next to bottom. Consequently, Bolton entered the match as favourites and won with a single goal scored by David Jack.

== Route to the final ==
=== Bolton Wanderers ===
Round	Opposition	Score
3rd	Accrington Stanley (h)	1–0
4th	Bournemouth & Boscombe Athletic (a)	2–2
4th	Bournemouth & Boscombe Athletic (h)	6–2
5th	South Shields (h)	3–0
6th	Nottingham Forest (a)	2–2
6th	Nottingham Forest (h)	0–0
6th	Nottingham Forest (n)	1–0
Semi-final	Swansea Town (n)	3–0

Both teams entered the competition in the third round, the entry point for First Division clubs. Bolton Wanderers were drawn away at Accrington Stanley but, following a request to the FA, the match was switched to Bolton for crowd safety reasons. Bolton's David Jack scored the only goal of the game in a close contest. To the resentment of the Bolton crowd, Ted Vizard was sent off for the first time in his career, leading the referee to require a police escort to the railway station. In the fourth round Bolton were held to a surprise draw by Third Division Bournemouth & Boscombe Athletic. The Wanderers lost Bill Cope to injury after fifteen minutes. A 1–0 half-time lead quickly turned into a 2–1 deficit early in the second half but, with five minutes remaining, Jack scored an equaliser.

Bolton's fifth round home tie against South Shields produced a straightforward 3–0 victory. The goals were scored by Joe Smith, Jack Smith and Jack, who maintained his record of scoring in every round. The quarter-final against Nottingham Forest required two replays to produce a winner. Following a 2–2 draw in Nottingham and a goalless game in Bolton, the Wanderers prevailed 1–0 in another close game held at Old Trafford. Bolton drew Swansea Town, the last remaining Second Division club, in the semi-finals, which meant they had not met a single First Division club in their path to the final. Three early goals gave Bolton a comfortable 3–0 win at White Hart Lane.

=== Manchester City ===
Round	Opposition	Score
3rd	Corinthians (a)	3–3
3rd	Corinthians (h)	4–0
4th	Huddersfield Town (h)	4–0
5th	Crystal Palace (h)	11–4
6th	Clapton Orient (h)	6–1
Semi-final	Manchester United (n)	3–0

Manchester City's third round tie was against the amateur club Corinthians at Crystal Palace. The third round was the furthest Corinithians had ever progressed, though until 1923 the club never entered the cup due to club rules preventing them from entering any competition with a prize. Manchester City went behind and only equalised three minutes from time. The Corinthians goalkeeper, Benjamin Howard Baker collided with a teammate, causing him to take more than four steps with the ball. From the resulting free kick, Frank Roberts scored in a goalmouth melee to take the tie to a replay, held the following Wednesday. The rematch proved less even and Manchester City won 4–0 courtesy of goals by Austin (twice), Hicks and Johnson. After his goal, Hicks had to leave the field as he had sustained an injury while performing a celebratory somersault. In the fourth round, City faced the league champions Huddersfield Town and again won 4–0. The crowd of 74,799 was by far the highest of the round, and only 1,200 short of the club record.

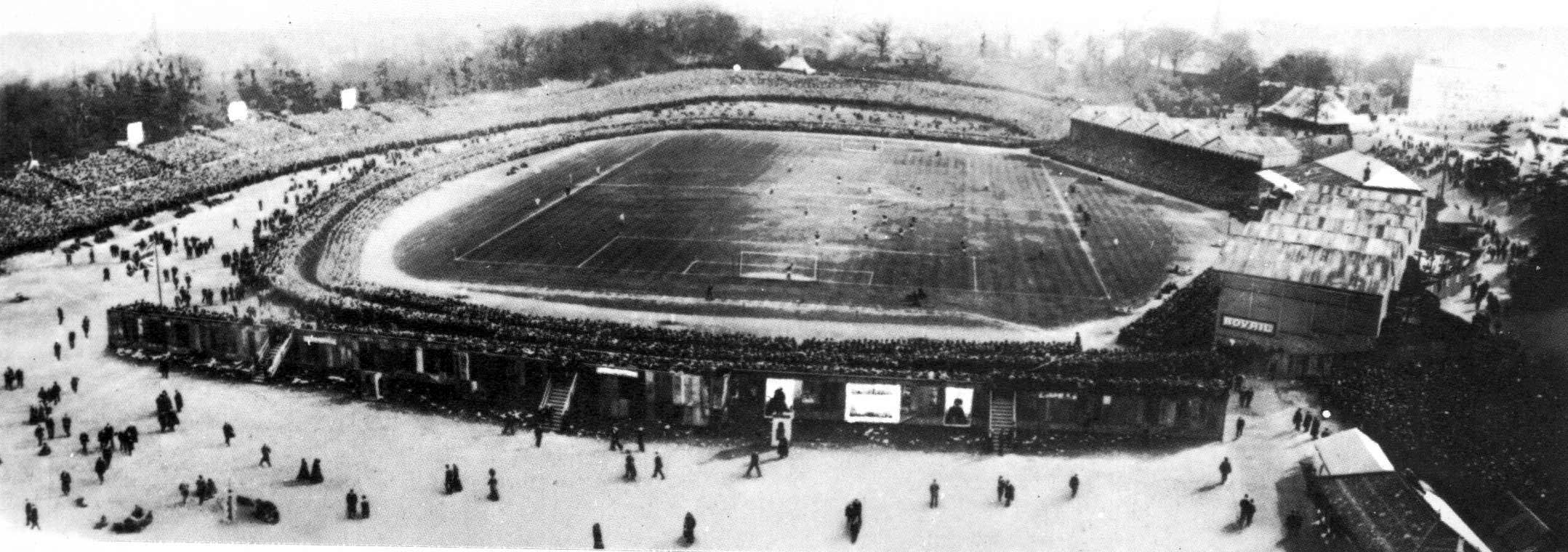
Manchester City's cup run started at the Crystal Palace.

Manchester City were drawn at home to Crystal Palace in the fifth round. A final score of 11–4 set a club record for the number of goals in a game and was City's biggest margin of victory since 1903. Frank Roberts scored five and Tommy Browell also scored a hat-trick. Another high scoring win was achieved in the quarter-final, when Clapton Orient were beaten 6–1. Johnson scored a hat-trick and Hicks scored for the fifth successive cup match.

In the semi-final, Manchester City faced their local rivals Manchester United in a derby match at Bramall Lane. Browell scored the opener from a Hicks corner amid vehement protests for handball from the United players. Later in the half, United's Frank Barson flattened Sam Cowan with an "ugly challenge" for which he later received a suspension. In the second half, Browell and Roberts each scored to make the final score 3–0.

== Build-up ==
Both teams had won the FA Cup on one previous occasion and had met in the 1904 FA Cup Final. In that match, Manchester City won 1–0 thanks to a Billy Meredith goal. The 1904 meeting was Manchester City's only previous final, whereas the 1926 tie was the fourth time Bolton had reached the final. They lost in 1894 and 1904, but won the competition for the first time in the "White Horse Final" of 1923, the first to be held at Wembley. The 1926 final was the first to be held since the change to the offside rule in 1925. It now required two defenders behind an attacker receiving the ball instead of three, a change which increased the average number of goals per match.

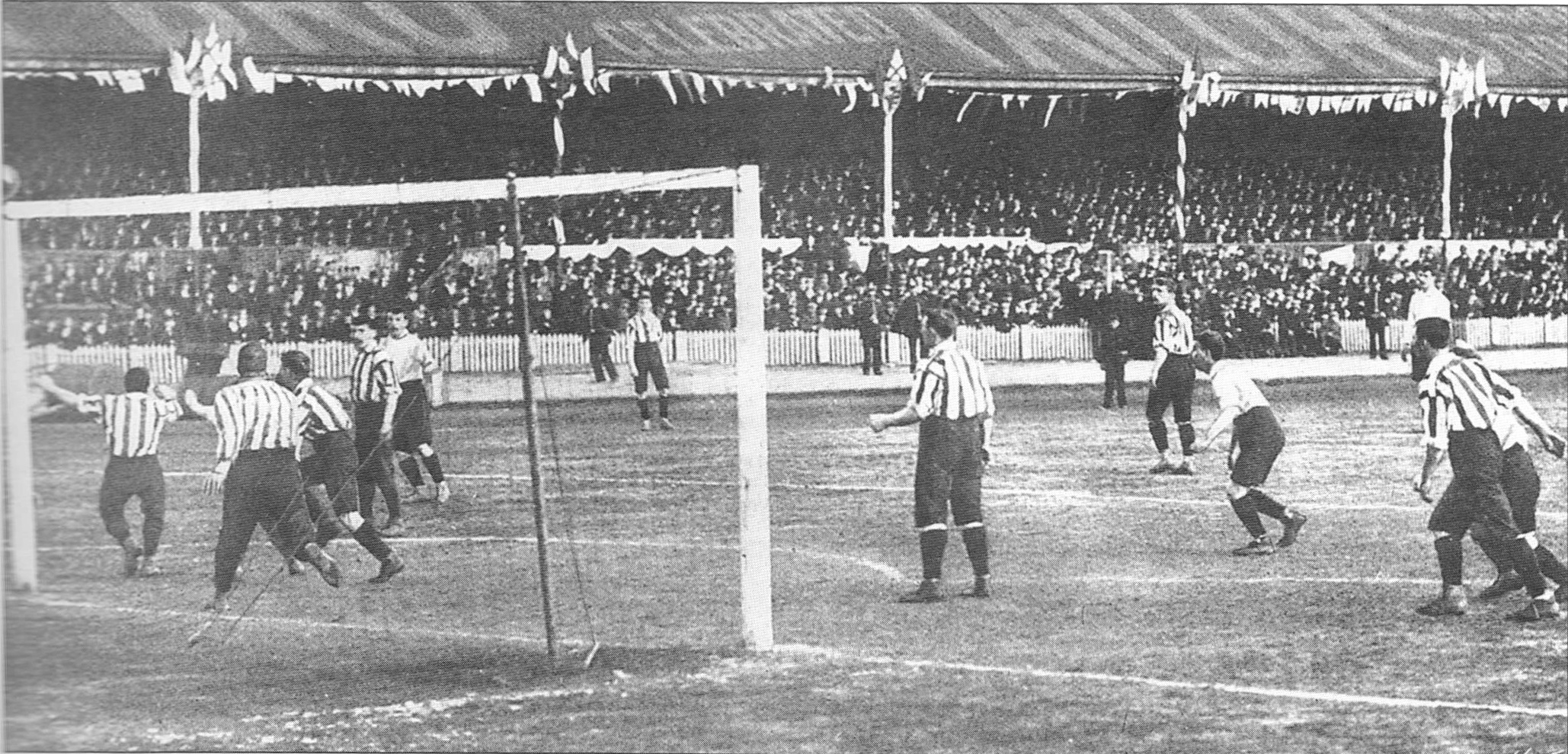
Bolton played at their Burnden Park ground in every round up to the quarter-final.

Of the two teams, Bolton Wanderers had the better league form. After rising as high as fourth early in the league season, Bolton spent the majority of the year in mid-table and finally finished 8th of the 22 First Division clubs with 44 points from their 42 league fixtures. Manchester City had remained in the lower reaches of the league table throughout the season and, with two league matches still to play, were in danger of relegation at the time of the final. Their matches were frequently high-scoring. City scored more league goals than second-placed Arsenal, but also had the second-worst defensive record in the division. The two league matches between the teams in the 1925–26 season ended in a 5–1 home win for Bolton in November and a 1–1 draw at Maine Road in March.

In accordance with changes made for the 1924 final onwards, all tickets were sold in advance to prevent a repeat of the overcrowding at the 1923 final. Approximately 91,000 tickets were available. 53,000 were standing tickets, 15,000 were uncovered seats and 23,000 were covered seats. Standing tickets cost two shillings, seat prices ranged from five shillings to one guinea. The majority of tickets were sold before the finalists were known. As a result, few supporters of the participating teams attended; most were unable to afford the remaining tickets available to the general public, which were typically in the more expensive areas of the stadium. 1,750 tickets were allocated directly to each club. Bolton fielded 6,000 enquiries and lodged a formal protest about the inadequacy of their allocation. The London, Midland and Scottish Railway laid on a total of seven special trains from Manchester to London on the eve and morning of the match. A number of supporters travelled to London without tickets in the hope of securing one outside the stadium. 5s tickets changed hands for up to 15s, provoking the ire of ticketless supporters who accused the sellers of profiteering. In one such instance, a man selling twenty 2s tickets at 10s each required the assistance of five police officers to escape the wrath of the crowd. The total gate receipts for the match were £23,157, a new record.

Manchester City prepared for the match by training in the spa town of Buxton. Bolton Wanderers followed their usual training schedule for most of the week, then travelled to Harrow on the Thursday. All eleven men who played for Bolton in their 1923 triumph were still at the club. Of those, only the injured Alex Finney was absent as they travelled to London. Jack Smith had been injured for several weeks in the run-up to the final, but recovered in time and participated in Bolton's last league match before the tie.

== Match ==
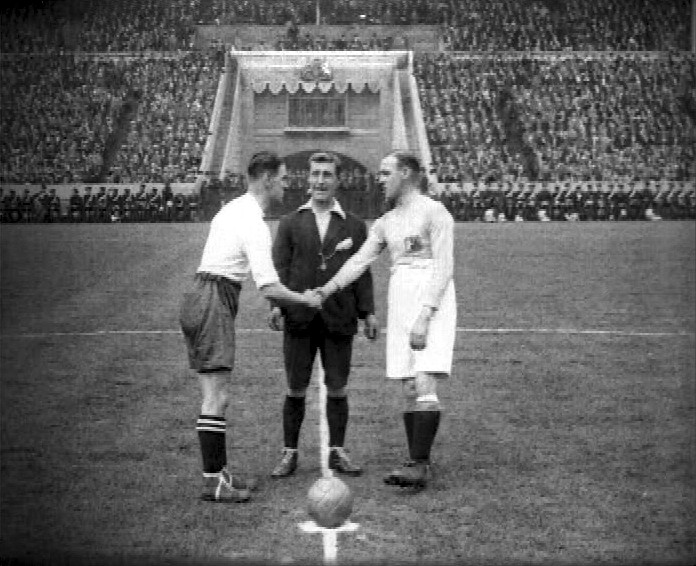
Captains greeting before the match

In the hour before kick-off, the crowd was entertained by the bands of the Royal Engineers and the Chatham Naval Dockyard. Following the National Anthem, the players, match officials and club chairmen were introduced to King George V. The toss was then won by the Bolton captain Joe Smith. In contrast to the lengthy delays which marred Bolton's previous visit to Wembley, the match kicked off three minutes earlier than scheduled.

As anticipated, Bolton fielded ten of the eleven who played the 1923 final. Left-back Harry Greenhalgh was the only change from the 1923 line-up. Each team played the formation typical of the era: two full-backs, three half-backs and five forwards. Bolton had the better of the opening exchanges; the Times correspondent wrote: "In the first five minutes Bolton Wanderers were so superior to their opponents that they might have been giving an exhibition for the cinema against schoolboys". Manchester City then gradually asserted themselves and had the first clear chance. Frank Roberts took a right-footed shot, but hit the ball straight at Bolton goalkeeper Dick Pym. Overall, the defences enjoyed the better of the play in the first half. Bolton's Joe Smith was instrumental in much of his team's attacking play, both he and left-winger Ted Vizard receiving praise for their play.

Hicks, who was generally described as the most effective of the Manchester City forwards, had a chance which he hit high over the crossbar. In a rare spell of sustained Manchester City pressure, a free kick by captain Jimmy McMullan forced a save from Pym, and the resulting near-post corner prompted a goalmouth scramble which ended with a foul on Bolton's Greenhalgh. Pym made further saves from Browell and Hicks, the latter resulting in a corner. From the corner Bolton won the ball and headed upfield on the counter-attack. Billy Butler's cross from the right went beyond the goal and was retrieved by Vizard on the left wing. The outside-forward then cut inside and played the ball across goal in a manner described by some correspondents as a shot and others as a pass. David Jack received the ball in the six-yard box and put the ball between Goodchild and McCloy into the City goal, giving Bolton the lead with 14 minutes remaining. In the few minutes after the goal, Manchester City came forward in numbers but lacked clear chances and were hindered by over-eager forwards going offside. Following a goal kick by Pym, the referee blew the final whistle. Bolton won the cup for a second time, becoming the first club to win twice at Wembley.

== Post-match ==
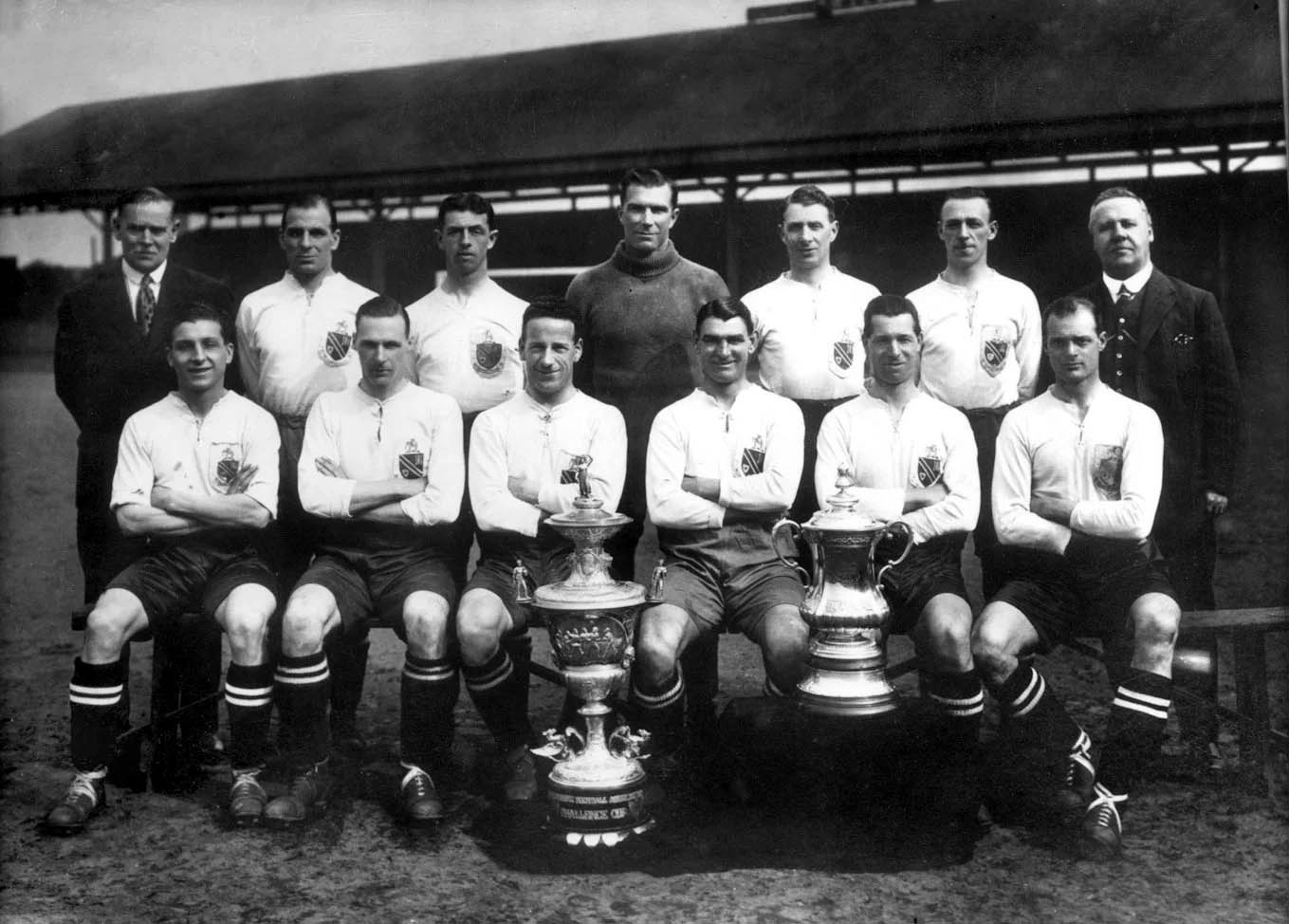
Players of Bolton Wanderers posing with the two trophies won in 1926. The FA Cup is at right.

The Bolton team were greeted by crowds at Bolton Town Hall. In a playful exchange, Joe Smith gave the Cup to the mayor, saying that it had been won for Bolton and was given to Bolton, which the mayor refused. Bolton went on to win a third FA Cup in 1929, beating Portsmouth 2–0 in the final. The 1929 team contained five of the 1926 cup winners. Their goalscorer in 1926, David Jack, was transferred to Arsenal in 1928. The transfer set a world record as the first to exceed £10,000. Jack won one more FA Cup with Arsenal.

Upon arrival back in Manchester, the Manchester City team were given a civic reception at Manchester Town Hall, then immediately travelled to their Maine Road ground to play a league fixture against Leeds United. Manchester City won that match 2–1, but failed to win the following Saturday and were relegated to the Second Division. In doing so they became the first Cup finalists to be relegated in the same season, which no other team matched until 1969. The final was the last time Albert Alexander's committee selected the team. Peter Hodge had agreed to join the club as manager well in advance of the final, but was unable to take up the position until his previous club Leicester City completed their league fixtures. Several seasons later, City's half-back Sam Cowan captained the club in the 1933 and 1934 finals.

== Match details ==
24 April 1926
15:00 BST

Bolton Wanderers	1–0	Manchester City
Jack 76'	Report

Wembley Stadium, London
Attendance: 91,447
Referee: I. Baker

Bolton Wanderers	Manchester City

GK	(England) Dick Pym
DF	(England) Bob Haworth
DF	(England) Harry Greenhalgh
DF	(England) Harry Nuttall
MF	(England) Jimmy Seddon
MF	(Wales) Billy Jennings
FW	(England) Billy Butler
FW	(Scotland) Jack Smith
FW	(England) David Jack
FW	(England) Joe Smith (c)
FW	(Wales) Ted Vizard
Manager:
(England) Charles Foweraker

GK	(England) Jim Goodchild
DF	(England) Sam Cookson
DF	(Scotland) Philip McCloy
MF	(Scotland) Charlie Pringle
MF	(England) Sam Cowan
MF	(Scotland) Jimmy McMullan (c)
FW	(England) Billy Austin
FW	(England) Tommy Browell
FW	(England) Frank Roberts
FW	(England) Tommy Johnson
FW	(England) George Hicks
Committee-Manager:
(England) Albert Alexander, Sr.

MATCH RULES

- 90 minutes.
- 30 minutes of extra-time if necessary.
- Replay if scores still level.
