= Bob Haworth =

English footballer

Personal information
- Full name: Robert Haworth
- Date of birth: 26 June 1897
- Place of birth: Atherton, England
- Date of death: 1962 (aged 64–65)
- Height: 5 ft 7 1/2 in (1.71 m)
- Position: Full back

Senior career*
Years	Team	Apps	(Gls)
- Howe Bridge
- Atherton Collieries
1920–1932	Bolton Wanderers	322	(0)
1932–?	Accrington Stanley	3	(0)
Total		325	(0)
- * Club domestic league appearances and goals

Robert Haworth (26 June 1897 – 1962) was an English footballer best known for playing for Bolton Wanderers, for whom he made over 300 appearances in The Football League. He played for the team in the 1923, 1926 and 1929 FA Cup Finals, winning on each occasion.

== Honours ==
Bolton Wanderers

- FA Cup: 1922–23, 1925–26, 1928–29
