= David Thackeray (footballer) =

Scottish footballer

Personal information
- Date of birth: 16 November 1902
- Place of birth: Hamilton, Scotland
- Place of death: England
- Position: Left half

Senior career*
Years	Team	Apps	(Gls)
1923–1925	Alloa Athletic	59	(2)
1925–1928	Motherwell	110	(4)
1928–1936	Portsmouth	280	(9)
Total		349	(15)

International career
1927	Scottish League XI	1	(0)
- * Club domestic league appearances and goals

David Thackeray (born 16 November 1902) was a Scottish footballer, who played as a left half for Alloa Athletic, Motherwell and Portsmouth.

Thackeray represented the Scottish League once, in October 1927. Portsmouth signed him from Motherwell in the following year for £3,500. He played for Portsmouth in the FA Cup Finals of 1929 and 1934, both of which were lost.

== Honours ==
Portsmouth

- FA Cup runner-up: 1928–29, 1933–34
