= Harry Nuttall (footballer) =

English footballer (1897–1969)

Henry Nuttall (9 November 1897 – 30 April 1969) was an English footballer who played as a right-half and is best known for being in the winning Bolton Wanderers team which won the FA Cup in 1923. He was twice capped for England.

Nuttall was signed by Charles Foweraker for Bolton Wanderers in 1921. After his playing days were over he continued for many years as member of the back room staff at Bolton.

== Honours ==
Bolton Wanderers

- FA Cup: 1922–23, 1925–26, 1928–29
