= Alex Finney (footballer, born 1902) =

English footballer

Personal information
- Date of birth: 13 March 1902
- Place of birth: St Helens, England
- Date of death: 1982 (aged 79–80)
- Height: 5 ft 8 1/2 in (1.74 m)
- Position: Full-back

Senior career*
Years	Team	Apps	(Gls)
- Sutton Juniors
- Peasley Cross
- South Liverpool
- New Brighton
1922–1937	Bolton Wanderers	483	(2)
1937–?	Darwen		
- * Club domestic league appearances and goals as of 11:08, 29 October 2008 (UTC)

Alexander Finney (13 March 1902 – 1982) was an English football player best known for playing for Bolton Wanderers, for whom he made nearly 500 appearances in The Football League. He played for the team in the 1923 and 1929 FA Cup Finals.

== Honours ==
Bolton Wanderers

- FA Cup: 1922–23, 1928–29
