= Fred Cook (Welsh footballer) =

Welsh footballer

Personal information
- Full name: Frederick William Cook
- Date of birth: 20 January 1902
- Place of birth: Aberdare, Wales
- Date of death: 1966
- Position: Outside left

Youth career
- Albions

Senior career*
Years	Team	Apps	(Gls)
1922	Aberdare Athletic	8	(1)
1923–1925	Newport County	119	(9)
1925–1932	Portsmouth	247	(41)
- Waterford
Total		374	(51)

International career
1925–1931	Wales	8	(0)
- * Club domestic league appearances and goals

Frederick William Cook (20 January 1902 in Aberdare – 1966) was a Welsh international footballer who played in the Football League as an outside-left for Aberdare Athletic, Newport County and Portsmouth, for whom he appeared in the 1929 FA Cup Final. He was part of the Wales national football team between 1925 and 1931, playing eight matches. He played his first match on 14 February 1925 against Scotland and his last match on 18 November 1931 against England.

== Honours ==
Portsmouth

- FA Cup runner-up: 1928–29

== See also ==
- List of Wales international footballers (alphabetical)
