= Harry Greenhalgh =

English footballer

Personal information
- Full name: Harry Woodgate Greenhalgh
- Date of birth: 27 June 1900
- Place of birth: Bolton, Lancashire, England
- Date of death: 1982
- Height: 5 ft 7 1/2 in (1.71 m)
- Position: Right back

Youth career
- Chorley Old Road Congregational
- Atherton

Senior career*
| Years | Team | Apps | (Gls) |
| 1923–1928 | Bolton Wanderers | 70 | (0) |
- * Club domestic league appearances and goals

Harry Woodgate Greenhalgh (27 June 1900 – 1982) was an English footballer who played as a right back in The Football League with Bolton Wanderers in the 1920s. He was a member of the Bolton Wanderers team which won the 1926 FA Cup Final.

== Honours ==
Bolton Wanderers

- FA Cup: 1925–26
