= Dick Pym =

English football goalkeeper (1893–1988)

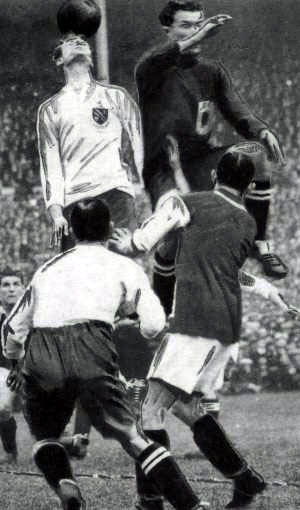

Personal information
- Full name: Richard Henry Pym
- Date of birth: 2 February 1893
- Place of birth: Topsham, Exeter, Devon, England
- Date of death: 16 September 1988 (aged 95)
- Place of death: Exeter, Devon, England
- Height: 5 ft 10 1/2 in (1.79 m)
- Position: Goalkeeper

Senior career*
Years	Team	Apps	(Gls)
- Topsham
1911–1921	Exeter City	39	(0)
1921–1931	Bolton Wanderers	301	(0)
1931–1932	Yeovil & Petters United		
- Topsham
Total		340	(0)

International career
1925–1926	England	3	(0)
- * Club domestic league appearances and goals

Richard Henry Pym (2 February 1893 – 16 September 1988) was an English footballer best known for being the Bolton Wanderers goalkeeper at the first ever FA Cup final to be played at Wembley Stadium in 1923.

The game, known as the White Horse Final because of the presence of a mounted white police horse at the helm of the crowd control, ended in a 2–0 win for Bolton. Pym had joined them from Exeter City two years earlier for a world record five thousand pounds. Pym, nicknamed Pincher Pym, won further FA Cup winners medals with Bolton in 1926 and 1929 and earned three England caps.

Dick Pym, born into a fishing family played for a local club in his hometown Topsham, initially as a centre-forward before moving to Exeter City in 1911. There he played his first game in the reserves in December and on 23 March 1912 he debuted in the first team, replacing the regular goalkeeper. He subsequently appeared in 186 consecutive matches in the Southern League for Exeter.

In 1914, under Exeter manager Arthur Chadwick, he toured Argentina and Brazil, playing Brazil in Rio de Janeiro in its historic first official match.

During the First World War, Pym joined the Devonshire Regiment in 1916, where he served as a Physical Training Instructor.

When Exeter City joined the Football League in 1920, Pym was sold to Bolton Wanderers at the end of the 1920/21 season for the enormous sum of £5,000 to enable the club to purchase its home ground, St James Park.

Pym debuted for England on 28 February 1925 in a 2–1 win over Wales. The following month he played in a 2–0 victory over Scotland. On 1 March 1926, again playing Wales, he earned his third and final cap. Pym left Bolton in 1930 after 336 matches for the club, going on to play for another year with non-league Yeovil & Petters United. After this he returned to the fishing industry.

He became the last-surviving member of the historic 1923 Bolton Wanderers team and lived until he was 95, earning him the record for the longest-lived England international footballer.

== Honours ==
Bolton Wanderers

- FA Cup: 1922–23, 1925–26, 1928–29
