= Charles Foweraker =

English football manager

Personal information
- Full name: Charles Elliott Foweraker
- Date of birth: 11 March 1877
- Place of birth: Ruthin, Wales
- Date of death: July 1950 (aged 73)
- Place of death: Bolton, England

Managerial career
- Years: Team
- 1919–1944: Bolton Wanderers

Charles Foweraker (11 March 1877 – July 1950) was an English football manager, serving in that capacity at Bolton Wanderers from 1919 to 1944, making him the club's longest-serving manager. He is also their most successful manager, winning the FA Cup three times during his time there.

Born Charles Elliott Foweraker, in Ruthin, Denbighshire, on 11 March 1877, his father Aaron was a coachman. He married Harriett Hodgkins at the parish church of St. Paul in Deansgate, Bolton on 19 July 1909.

Foweraker was employed in various capacities by the club for 49 years, initially as a gateman and checker when Burnden Park first opened. At that time he was also employed by the Lancashire and Yorkshire Railway Company. Acting initially as assistant to Tom Mather, when Mather was called up by the Royal Navy in 1915, Foweraker took on his duties before making the position his own in 1919.

During his time as manager, he presided over the club's greatest triumphs. The FA Cup was won in 1923 (the White Horse Final), 1926 and 1929. He also discovered Nat Lofthouse, a player generally regarded as the best the club has ever produced.

In July 1938, Foweraker was presented with the Football League's Long Service Medal in recognition of more than 21 years' service to the club. He also served as vice-president of the Lancashire Football Association. When World War II broke out, Foweraker worked for the club on a voluntary basis, but ill health forced him to retire in 1944. He died in Bolton in July 1950.
