= Harold Blackmore =

English footballer

Personal information
- Full name: Harold Alfred Blackmore
- Date of birth: 13 May 1904
- Place of birth: Silverton, England
- Date of death: 1989 (aged 84–85)
- Position: Forward

Senior career*
Years	Team	Apps	(Gls)
1922–1923	Silverton		
1923–1924	Bradninch		
1924–1926	Exeter City	71	(45)
1926–1931	Bolton Wanderers	153	(111)
1932–1933	Middlesbrough	19	(9)
1933–1934	Bradford Park Avenue	60	(32)
1934	Bury	6	(4)
1935	Exeter City	0	(0)
Total		309	(201)
- * Club domestic league appearances and goals

Harold Alfred Blackmore (13 May 1904 – 1989) was an English professional footballer who played in the Football League for Exeter City, Bolton Wanderers, Middlesbrough, Bradford Park Avenue and Bury.

== Personal life ==
Blackmore was married with three sons and after retiring from football, he opened a butcher's shop.

== Career statistics ==
Appearances and goals by club, season and competition
Club	Season	League			FA Cup		Total	
Club	Season	Division	Apps	Goals	Apps	Goals	Apps	Goals
Middlesbrough	1932–33	First Division	19	9	4	3	22	12
Career total			19	9	4	3	22	12

== Honours ==
Bolton Wanderers

- FA Cup: 1928–29
