= David Watson (footballer, born 1896) =

Scottish footballer (1896–1978)

Personal information
- Full name: David Watson
- Date of birth: 2 October 1896
- Place of birth: Cowie, Stirlingshire (now Cowie, Stirling), Scotland
- Date of death: 1978 (aged 81–82)
- Position: Inside forward

Senior career*
Years	Team	Apps	(Gls)
1914–1915	Falkirk		
1915–1918	Bo'ness		
1918–1919	Sunderland	0	(0)
1920–1930	Portsmouth	275	(61)
1930	Bo'ness		
Total		275	(61)
- * Club domestic league appearances and goals

David Watson (2 October 1896 – 1978) was a Scottish footballer who played in the Football League for Portsmouth.

== Honours ==
Portsmouth

- FA Cup runner-up: 1928–29
