= Edwin Davies =

British businessman and philanthropist

Eddy Davies
- Born: 18 June 1946; Little Lever, England
- Died: 11 September 2018 (aged 72)
- Education: Farnworth Grammar School; Durham University
- Occupations: Businessman, philanthropist
- Title: Lord of the Manor of Farnworth
- Spouse: Susan Davies
- Children: 2

Eddie Davies CBE (18 June 1946 – 11 September 2018) was a British businessman and philanthropist. He served as chairman of the Strix Group from 1984 to 2006. He was the owner of Bolton Wanderers F.C. until March 2016, when Dean Holdsworth fronted a consortium to take over the club. The Eddie and Susan Davies Galleries at the Victoria and Albert Museum in London are named in his honour.

== Early life ==
Eddie Davies was born on 18 June 1946 in Little Lever, near Bolton, Lancashire, England. He was educated at the Farnworth Grammar School in Farnworth, Lancashire, England. He received a Bachelor of Arts degree in Mathematics from Durham University.

== Career ==
Davies started his career at Avon Rubber. He worked in management at the Scapa Group from 1968 to 1984. He served as chairman of the Strix Group from 1984 to 2006.

He joined the board of directors of Bolton Wanderers F.C. in 1999. By 2003, he became the majority shareholder of Burnden Leisure, which owned Bolton Wanderers. In 2011–2013, he was still the owner of the club. In October 2014, it was announced that Davies was ready to sell the club. Davies wrote-off loans to Bolton which, including interest, totalled approximately £175 million. Shortly after his death, it was revealed that, four days before he died, Davies had given Bolton £5 million to help save the club from administration.

He served on the boards of directors of Moonshift Investments, Sula Group, and Squarestone Brasil. He has been a Fellow of the Chartered Institute of Management Accountants since 1985 and the Chartered Management Institute since 1996. He became an Officer of the Most Excellent Order of the British Empire (OBE) for services to industry in 2000.

As of 2004, he was the 558th richest man in the United Kingdom, with an estimated wealth of £60million.

== Philanthropy ==
He was for a time a Trustee of the Victoria and Albert Museum in London. The Eddie and Susan Davies Galleries at the V&A are the result of charitable donations from Davies and his wife. Those five galleries include 200 paintings by Thomas Gainsborough, John Constable, J. M. W. Turner, Sandro Botticelli, Tintoretto, Dante Gabriel Rossetti, Edgar Degas and Eugène Delacroix.

He made a charitable contribution of £100,000 to the Royal Bolton Hospital in Bolton for the establishment of a coronary care unit. He also made charitable gift to the Manchester Business School, part of the University of Manchester, which led to the establishment of the Eddie Davies Library. He received an honorary doctorate in 2008.

He became a Commander of the Most Excellent Order of the British Empire (CBE) for charitable services in 2011.

== Personal life ==
He was married to Susan Davies. They had two children. They resided on the Isle of Man. He underwent coronary artery bypass surgery in 1996.
