= Ted Vizard =

Welsh footballer and manager (1889–1973)

Personal information
- Full name: Edward Vizard
- Date of birth: 7 June 1889
- Place of birth: Cogan, Penarth, Wales
- Date of death: 25 December 1973 (aged 84)
- Place of death: Wolverhampton, England
- Height: 5 ft 9 1/4 in (1.76 m)
- Position: Outside left

Senior career*
Years	Team	Apps	(Gls)
1909–10	Barry District	24	(6)
1910–1931	Bolton Wanderers	467	(64)
Total		491	(70)

International career
1911–1926	Wales	22	(1)

Managerial career
- 1933–1939: Swindon Town
- 1939–1944: Queens Park Rangers
- 1944–1948: Wolverhampton Wanderers
- * Club domestic league appearances and goals

Edward Vizard (7 June 1889 – 25 December 1973) was a Welsh international footballer who became a manager. He spent almost all his playing career at Bolton Wanderers.

== Playing career ==
Born in Charlotte Street in Cogan, Wales, to parents from originally from Wiltshire in England, Vizard joined Bolton Wanderers in September 1910 from Barry, making his debut later that year. From here, he never looked back making the outside left position his own for the next 18 seasons. In total, he made 512 appearances for the Trotters scoring 70 goals.

During his time at Bolton, he appeared in the 1923 and 1926 FA Cup Finals, winning both. He remained in the team until retiring in 1931 aged 41, becoming the oldest player to play for the club (a record only broken in 1995 by Peter Shilton).

Vizard also won 22 international caps for Wales, scoring one goal, the winner in a 2-1 win against England in 1924 when he pounced on a rebound after England goalkeeper Ronnie Sewell saved a Jack Nicholls shot. Vizard also captained his country - against England in 1914 at Ninian Park and against Scotland in 1921 at Pittodrie.

== Managerial career ==
=== Swindon Town ===
In April 1933 Vizard gave up his position as coach of the 'A' team with Bolton Wanderers in order to become the manager of Swindon Town, a position he held until 1939.

=== QPR ===
After the 1938–39 season, Vizard left the club to take the reins at Queens Park Rangers, succeeding Billy Birrell. Due to the outbreak of World War II causing the suspension of league football, he never had the chance to manage them in a competitive game. Despite this they were relatively successful in wartime football and in 1944 he replaced Major Frank Buckley as manager of Wolverhampton Wanderers.

=== Wolves ===
He was appointed Wolves manager in April 1944, and despite taking them to third place in the First Division in the first peacetime season in 1946/47, he was replaced by Stan Cullis in the summer of 1948.

== National service ==
In the summer of 1915, the FA banned the payment of professional players due to World War One, leaving players with the choice of joining the army or finding new civilian jobs. Ted found work in the munitions industry and enlisted but did not get formally called up until early 1916, along with his partner on the Bolton wing, England international Joe Smith.

== Personal life ==
Whilst on leave from the Army, Ted married Annie Clara Singleton, better known as Clarice, on New Year's Day 1918. Afterwards, Ted played for Bolton against Bury FC and was appointed captain for the day in honour of his marriage.

Clarice worked as a telephonist in an exchange and had a keen interest in football herself before he met Ted and she later coached a Bolton ladies team which was sometimes called Mrs Vizard‘s XI. Clarice was in charge when Dick Kerr's Ladies were beaten for the first time in 1918.

== Honours ==
Bolton Wanderers

- FA Cup: 1922–23, 1925–26
