= Billy Butler (footballer) =

English footballer (1900–1966)

Personal information
- Full name: William Butler
- Date of birth: 17 March 1900
- Place of birth: Atherton, England
- Date of death: 11 July 1966 (aged 66)
- Place of death: Durban, South Africa
- Height: 5 ft 7 in (1.70 m)
- Position: Midfielder

Senior career*
Years	Team	Apps	(Gls)
1920–1933	Bolton Wanderers	407	(65)
1933–1935	Reading		

International career
1924	England	1	(0)

Managerial career
- 1935–1939: Reading
- 1939–?: Guildford City
- 1945–1946: Torquay United
- * Club domestic league appearances and goals

William Butler (17 March 1900 – 11 July 1966) was an English professional footballer who was most famously a winger for Bolton Wanderers in the 1920s.

Billy Butler was born in Atherton, Lancashire. He had never played for any form of organised football team prior to joining the army. He played as a centre-forward for his regiment and on leaving the army he joined his hometown club Atherton at the age of 19. He moved to Bolton Wanderers in April 1920 and, on moving to the right wing, soon established himself. He played in the 1923 FA Cup Final victory over West Ham United, the famous first Wembley final, and the following year, on 12 April 1924, made his England debut against Scotland.

It was to be his only appearance for the England national team, but he was back at Wembley again for the 1926 FA Cup Final win over Manchester City, and picked up his third winners medal in 1929, scoring the opening goal in the 2–0 defeat of Portsmouth.

On Bolton's relegation in 1933, Butler asked for a transfer and left to join his former Bolton teammate Joe Smith, who by now was manager of Reading. He had played 449 games for Bolton, scoring 74 goals.

In August 1935, Smith left to manage Blackpool and Butler took over the reins at Reading and carried on with the good work Smith had started. Reading never finished below 6th place in Division Three (South) during Butler's tenure and were heading for another top five finish when he resigned in February 1939.

He became manager of Guildford City, but then World War II intervened and Butler joined the RAF as a PT instructor. With the war over, Butler was appointed manager of Torquay United in August 1945, but left Plainmoor in May 1946 before league football had resumed.

He subsequently moved to South Africa to manage Johannesburg Rangers, where he discovered the future Wolves defender Eddie Stuart and future Blackpool and England left winger Bill Perry. He was later a coach for the Pietermaritzburg & District Football Association and then a coach for the Rhodesian Football Association

Butler died in Durban in July 1966, aged 66.

== Honours ==
Bolton Wanderers

- FA Cup: 1922–23, 1925–26, 1928–29

Preceded by ?	Guildford City Manager; 1939–?	Succeeded by ?
