= Jimmy Seddon =

English footballer

Jimmy Seddon (20 May 1895 – October 1971) was an English footballer who played most famously in the centre of defence for Bolton Wanderers during the 1920s.

For Bolton he played 375 games in all completions, scoring 5 goals, he also collected 3 FA Cup Winners Medals in 1923, 1926 and 1929, captaining the team in the 1929 final. At the peak of his career, Jimmy also picked up 6 caps for England, making his debut in 1923 against France in Paris.

He also played two games for Mossley – the last game of the 1933–34 season and the first game of the following term, before departing to coach at Dordrecht in Holland. In 1936 he was appointed trainer of Southport.

He was related to fellow footballer Ernie Phythian.

== Honours ==
Bolton Wanderers

- FA Cup: 1922–23, 1925–26, 1928–29
