= Bolton Wanderers F.C. =

Association football club in England

Bolton Wanderers
- Full name: Bolton Wanderers Football Club
- Nicknames: The Trotters; The Wanderers; The Whites
- Short name: BWFC
- Founded: 1874; 152 years ago (as Christ Church F.C.)
- Ground: Toughsheet Community Stadium
- Capacity: 28,723
- Owner(s): Football Ventures (Whites) Ltd (92%); British Business Bank (8%)
- Chairman: Sharon Brittan
- Head coach: Steven Schumacher
- League: EFL Championship
- 2025–26: EFL League One, 5th of 24 (promoted via play-offs)
- Website: bwfc.co.uk
Home colours	Away colours	Third colours

Bolton Wanderers Football Club (/ˈboʊltən/ BOHL-tən, abbreviated as BWFC) is a professional association football club based in the Horwich area of Bolton, Greater Manchester, England. The club competes in the EFL Championship, the second tier of the English Football League, in the 2026–27 season following promotion from EFL League One via the play-offs in May 2026.

The club started as Christ Church FC in 1874 and became Bolton Wanderers three years later in 1877. It was among the 12 founding members of the Football League in 1888. The club won the Second Division title in the 1908–09 season and claimed the FA Cup on four occasions, winning in 1923, 1926, 1929 and 1958. Their 1923 triumph came in the first FA Cup final held at Wembley Stadium, a match later known as the "White Horse Final". Bolton were relegated from the top division in 1964 and again in 1971, but returned after winning the Third Division title in 1972–73 and the Second Division title in 1977–78. However, a series of subsequent relegations saw the club fall to the Fourth Division by 1987. They secured promotion from the Fourth Division in 1987–88 and won the Football League Trophy in 1989, having previously finished as runners-up in the competition in 1986.

Promotions in the 1992–93 and 1994–95 seasons saw Bolton Wanderers reach the Premier League for the first time. The club won the First Division title in 1996–97, although they were unable to retain their top-flight status for more than a single season until gaining promotion under Sam Allardyce through victory in the 2001 First Division play-off final. Bolton subsequently spent eleven consecutive seasons in the Premier League and reached the 2004 League Cup final, as well as the knockout stages of the UEFA Cup on two occasions. Two relegations within five seasons saw the club return to League One by 2016. Bolton achieved promotion in the 2016–17 season, but severe financial difficulties led to the club entering administration in 2019 after relegation back to the third tier had been confirmed. Amid the possibility of expulsion from the English Football League, the club was acquired by new ownership. Following relegation to League Two in 2020, Bolton secured promotion in the 2020–21 season and won the EFL Trophy, for the second time, during the 2022–23 campaign. Bolton secured promotion in the 2025-26 season via the play-offs.

From 1895 until 1997, Bolton Wanderers played their home matches at Burnden Park after relocating from their original ground at Pike's Lane. In 1997, the club moved to the Reebok Stadium, which has since undergone several naming changes and is currently known as the Toughsheet Community Stadium. Bolton have spent 73 seasons in the top tier of English football without winning a league title, the highest total of any club.

== History ==
=== Early history (1874–1929) ===
The club was founded by the Reverend Joseph Farrall Wright, Perpetual curate of Christ Church Bolton, and Thomas Ogden, the schoolmaster at the adjacent church school, in 1874 as Christ Church F.C. It was initially run from the church of the same name on Deane Road, Bolton, on the site where the Innovation factory of the University of Bolton now stands. The club left the location following a dispute with the vicar, and changed its name to Bolton Wanderers in 1877. The name was chosen as the club initially had a lot of difficulty finding a permanent ground to play on, having used three venues in its first four years of existence.

Bolton were one of the 12 founder members of the Football League, which formed in 1888. At the time Lancashire was one of the strongest footballing regions in the country, with 6 of the 12 founder clubs coming from within the boundaries of the historic county of Lancashire. Having remained in the Football League since its formation, Bolton have spent more time in the top flight (Premier League/old First Division) than out of it.

Bolton won the celebrated 1923 FA Cup final

Chart showing the progress of Bolton Wanderers F.C. through the English football league system.

In 1894 Bolton reached the final of the FA Cup for the first time, but lost 4–1 to Notts County at Goodison Park. A decade later they were runners-up a second time, losing 1–0 to local rivals Manchester City at Crystal Palace on 23 April 1904.

The period before and after the First World War was Bolton's most consistent period of top-flight success as measured by league finishes, with the club finishing outside the top 8 of the First Division on only two occasions between 1911–12 and 1927–28. In this period Bolton equalled their record finish of third twice, in 1920–21 and 1924–25, on the latter occasion missing out on the title by just 3 points (in an era of 2 points for a win).

On 28 April 1923, Bolton won their first major trophy in their third final, beating West Ham United 2–0 in the first ever Wembley FA Cup final. The match, famously known as The White Horse final was played in front of over 127,000 supporters. Bolton's centre-forward, David Jack scored the first ever goal at Wembley Stadium. Driven by long-term players Joe Smith in attack, Ted Vizard and Billy Butler on the wings, and Jimmy Seddon in defence, they became the most successful cup side of the twenties, winning three times. Their second victory of the decade came in 1926, beating Manchester City 1–0 in front of over 91,000 spectators, and the third came in 1929 as Portsmouth were beaten 2–0 in front of nearly 93,000 fans.

In 1928, the club faced financial difficulties and was forced to sell David Jack to Arsenal to raise funds. Despite the pressure to sell, the agreed fee of £10,890 was a world record, more than double the previous most expensive transfer of a player.

=== Top flight run and cup success (1929–1958) ===
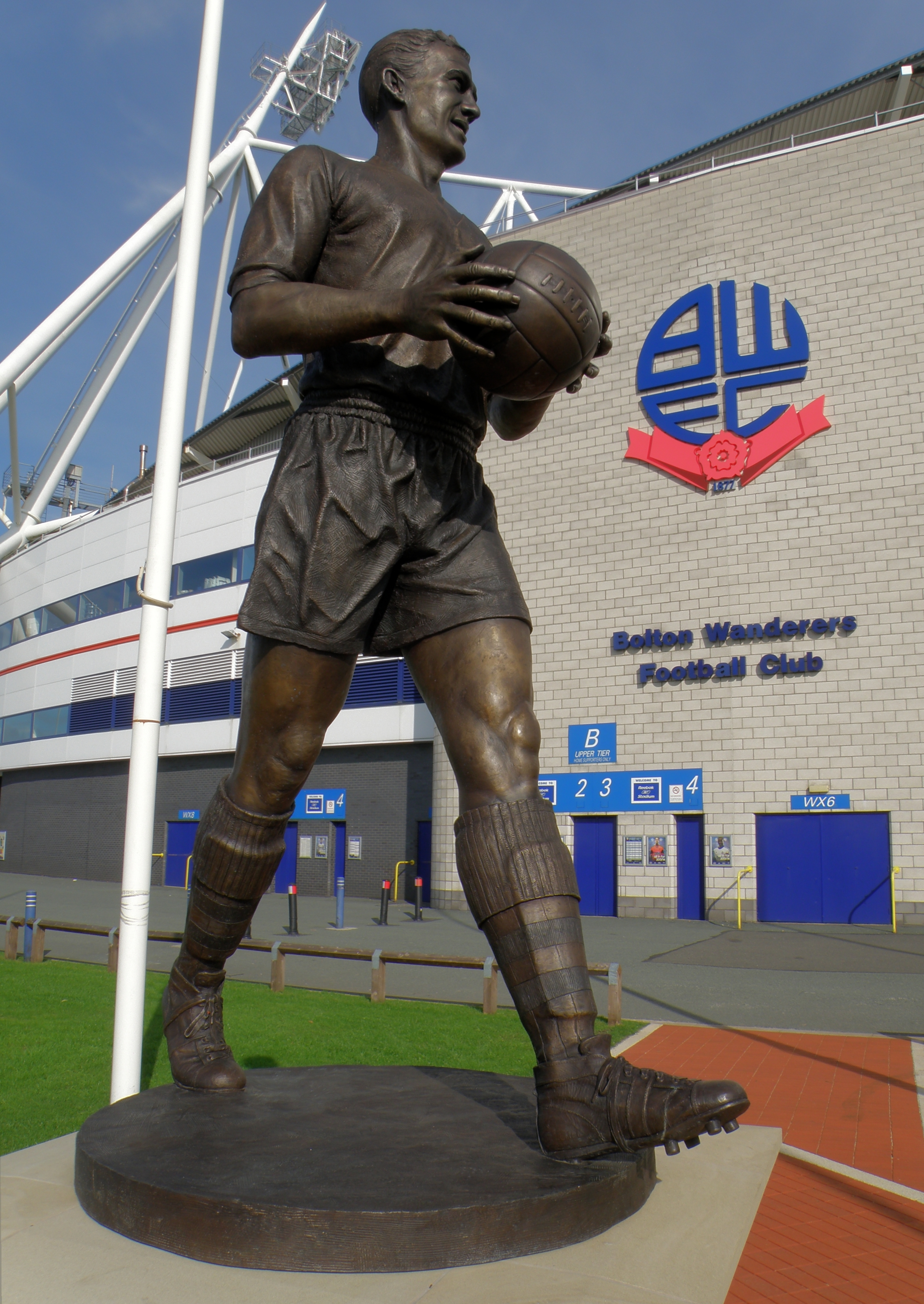
Nat Lofthouse spent his entire career, from 1946 to 1960, with Bolton, scoring 255 league goals

From 1935 to 1964, Bolton enjoyed an uninterrupted stay in the top flight – regarded by fans as a golden era – spearheaded in the 1950s by Nat Lofthouse. The years of the Second World War saw most of the Wanderers' playing staff see action on the front, a rare occurrence within elite football, as top sportsmen were generally assigned to physical training assignments, away from enemy fire. However, 15 Bolton professionals, led by their captain Harry Goslin, volunteered for active service in 1939, and enlisted in the 53rd (Bolton) Field Regiment, Royal Artillery. By the end of the war, 32 of the 35 pre-war professionals saw action in the British forces. The sole fatality was Goslin, who had by then risen to the rank of Lieutenant and was killed by shrapnel on the Italian front shortly before Christmas 1943. 53rd Bolton Artillery took part in the Battle of Dunkirk and also served in the campaigns of Egypt, Iraq and Italy. Remarkably, a number of these soldiers managed to carry on playing the game in these theatres of war, taking on as 'British XI' various scratch teams assembled by, among others, King Farouk of Egypt in Cairo and Polish forces in Baghdad.

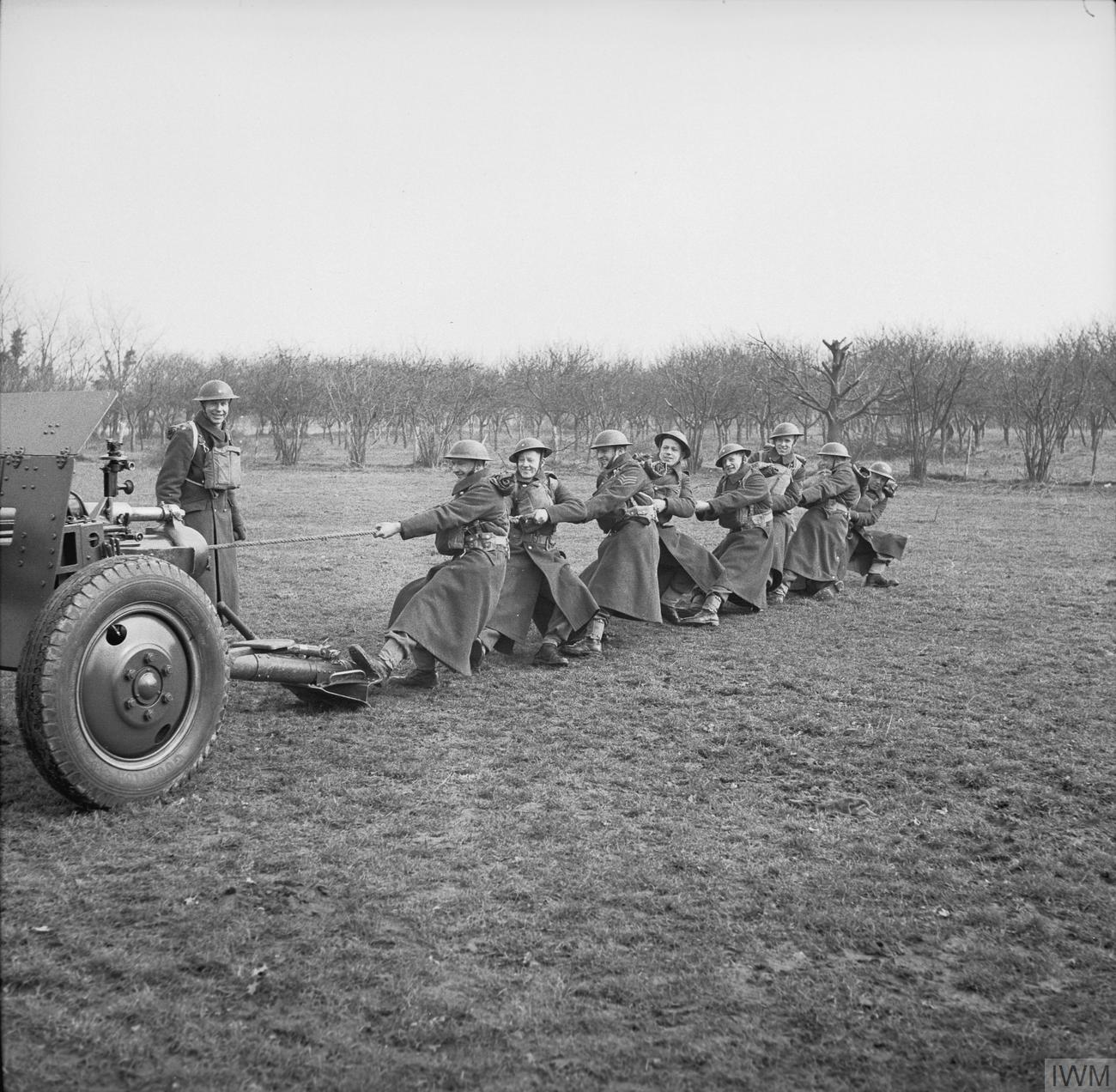
Men from Bolton Wanderers Football Club serving together with a battery of artillery in the 53rd (Bolton) Field Regiment, Royal Artillery, of the 42nd (East Lancashire) Infantry Division, at Beccles, Suffolk on the east coast of England. The photograph, taken sometime in 1940, shows the nine footballers in uniform cleaning an artillery piece.

On 9 March 1946, the club's home was the scene of the Burnden Park disaster which, at the time, was the worst tragedy in British football history. 33 Bolton Wanderers fans were crushed to death, and another 400 injured, in an FA Cup quarter-final second leg tie between Bolton and Stoke City. There was an estimated 67,000-strong crowd crammed in for the game, though other estimates vary widely, and a further 15,000 had been locked out when it became clear the stadium was full. The disaster led to Moelwyn Hughes's official report, which recommended more rigorous control of crowd sizes.

In 1953, Bolton played in one of the most famous FA Cup finals of all time – The Stanley Matthews final of 1953. Bolton lost the game to Blackpool 4–3 after having had a 3–1 lead. Blackpool were victorious thanks to the skills of Matthews and the goals of Stan Mortensen.

Bolton Wanderers have not won a major trophy since 1958, when two Lofthouse goals saw them overcome Manchester United in the FA Cup final in front of a 100,000 crowd at Wembley Stadium. The closest they have come to winning a major trophy since then is finishing runners-up in the League Cup, first in 1995 and again in 2004.

=== Few highs and many lows (1958–1995) ===
While Bolton finished fourth the following season, the next 20 years proved to be a fallow period. The club suffered relegation to the Second Division in 1963–64, and were then relegated again to the Third Division for the first time in their history in 1970–71. This stay in the Third Division lasted just two years before the club were promoted as champions in 1972–73. Hopes were high at Burnden Park in May 1978 when Bolton sealed the Second Division title and gained promotion to the First Division. However, they only remained there for two seasons before being relegated.

Following relegation in 1980, Bolton signed up talented striker Brian Kidd, as they prepared to challenge for a quick return to the First Division. Kidd scored a hat-trick in his third game for Bolton, a 4–0 win over Newcastle United in the league, but the rest of the season was a struggle as Bolton finished close to the relegation places. By the end of the 1981–82 season, Bolton were no closer to promotion and had lost several key players including Peter Reid and Neil Whatmore. The following season Bolton were relegated to the Third Division after losing 4–1 at Charlton Athletic on the final day.

Despite a new-look, much younger team, and an 8–1 win over Walsall, Bolton's best league win for 50 years, Bolton failed to win promotion in the 1983–84 season, and remained in the Third Division for another three seasons. In 1986, Nat Lofthouse was appointed President of the football club, a position he would hold until his death on 15 January 2011. At the end of the 1986–87 season, Bolton Wanderers suffered relegation to the Fourth Division for the first time in their history, but won promotion back to the Third Division at the first attempt. The club won the Sherpa Van Trophy in 1989, defeating Torquay United 4–1. During the 1990–91 season, Bolton were pipped to the final automatic promotion place by Southend United and lost to Tranmere Rovers in the play-off final, but they failed to build on this and the following season saw the club finish 13th.

The early 1990s saw Bolton gain a giant-killing reputation in cup competitions. In 1993, Bolton beat FA Cup holders Liverpool 2–0 in a third round replay at Anfield, thanks to goals from John McGinlay and Andy Walker. The club also defeated higher division opposition in the form of Wolverhampton Wanderers (2–1) that year before bowing out to Derby County. Bolton also secured promotion to the second tier for the first time since 1983. In 1994 Bolton again beat FA Cup holders, this time in the form of Arsenal, 3–1 after extra time in a fourth round replay, and went on to reach the quarter-finals, bowing out 1–0 at home to local rivals (and then Premiership) Oldham Athletic. Bolton also defeated top division opposition in the form of Everton (3–2) and Aston Villa (1–0) that year.

=== Return to the top flight and venture into Europe (1995–2012) ===
Bolton reached the Premiership in 1995, thanks to a 4–3 victory over Reading in the Division One play-off final. Reading took a 2–0 lead before a Keith Branagan penalty save in the 42nd minute changed the course of the game. Bolton scored two late goals to take the game to extra time, scoring twice more before a late Reading consolation. The same year Bolton progressed to the League Cup final, but were defeated 2–1 by Liverpool. Bolton were bottom for virtually all of the 1995–96 Premiership campaign and were relegated as they lost their penultimate game 1–0 to Southampton.

The club won promotion back to the Premiership at the first attempt, after a season in which they achieved 98 league points and 100 goals in the process of securing the Division One championship, the first time since 1978 that they had finished top of any division. That season also marked the club's move from Burnden Park to the new Reebok Stadium, the last game at the stadium being a 4–1 win over Charlton Athletic.

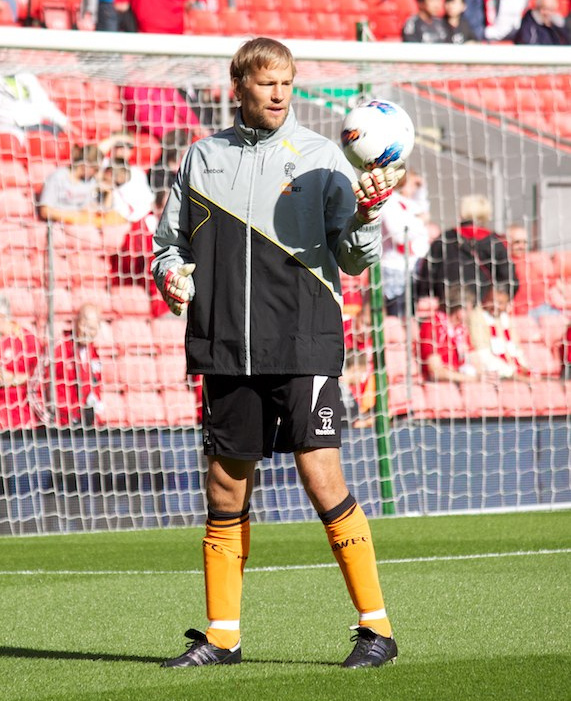
Jussi Jääskeläinen is equal third on Bolton Wanderers' record appearance list, making 530 appearances between 1997 and 2012

Bolton were relegated on goal difference at the end of the 1997–98 Premiership campaign. They finished on the same number of points as Everton, whom they had faced in the first competitive match at the new Reebok Stadium. That game finished 0–0, but the failure to award a goal scored by Gerry Taggart for the Whites meant that they did not gain the additional point which, at the end of the season, would have kept them up. The following season, they reached the 1999 Division One play-off final but lost 2–0 to Watford.

In 2000, Bolton reached the semi-finals of the FA Cup, Worthington Cup and play-offs but lost on penalties to Aston Villa, 4–0 on aggregate to Tranmere Rovers and 7–5 on aggregate to Ipswich Town respectively. In 2000–01 Bolton were promoted back to the Premiership after beating Preston North End 3–0 in the play-off final.

Bolton struggled during the following two seasons, but survived in the Premiership. The 2001–02 season began with a shock victory as they destroyed Leicester 5–0 at Filbert Street. They followed that win with two more, over Middlesbrough and Liverpool, to go top of the top flight table for the first time since 1891. Despite a 2–1 win away at Manchester United, becoming the first team since the formation of the Premiership to come from behind and win a league game at Old Trafford, Bolton went into a deep slump during the middle of the season and needed a Fredi Bobic hat-trick against Ipswich Town to survive. Despite losing the final three games, 16th place was secured. The 2002–03 season began with a poor start and, despite another win away at Manchester United, they were bottom until a 4–2 win against Leeds United at Elland Road. Despite suffering from a lack of consistency, Bolton achieved the results needed and secured survival in a final day 2–1 victory over Middlesbrough.

Bolton reached the League Cup final in 2004, but lost 2–1 to Middlesbrough. Nevertheless, the club finished eighth in the league, at the time the highest finish in their Premiership history.

In 2005, Bolton finished sixth in the league, thus earning qualification for the UEFA Cup for the first time in their history. The following season, they reached the last 32 but were eliminated by French team Marseille as they lost 2–1 on aggregate. Between 2003–04 and 2006–07, Bolton recorded consecutive top-eight finishes, a record of consistency bettered only by the big four of Chelsea, Manchester United, Liverpool and Arsenal. Towards the end of the 2006–07 season, long-serving manager Sam Allardyce departed the club, stating that he was taking a sabbatical, but he was hired shortly thereafter as manager of Newcastle United. Allardyce later cited a lack of ambition on the part of the club's board for his departure. In January 2007, he had unsuccessfully sought financial backing to push the club towards Champions League qualification.

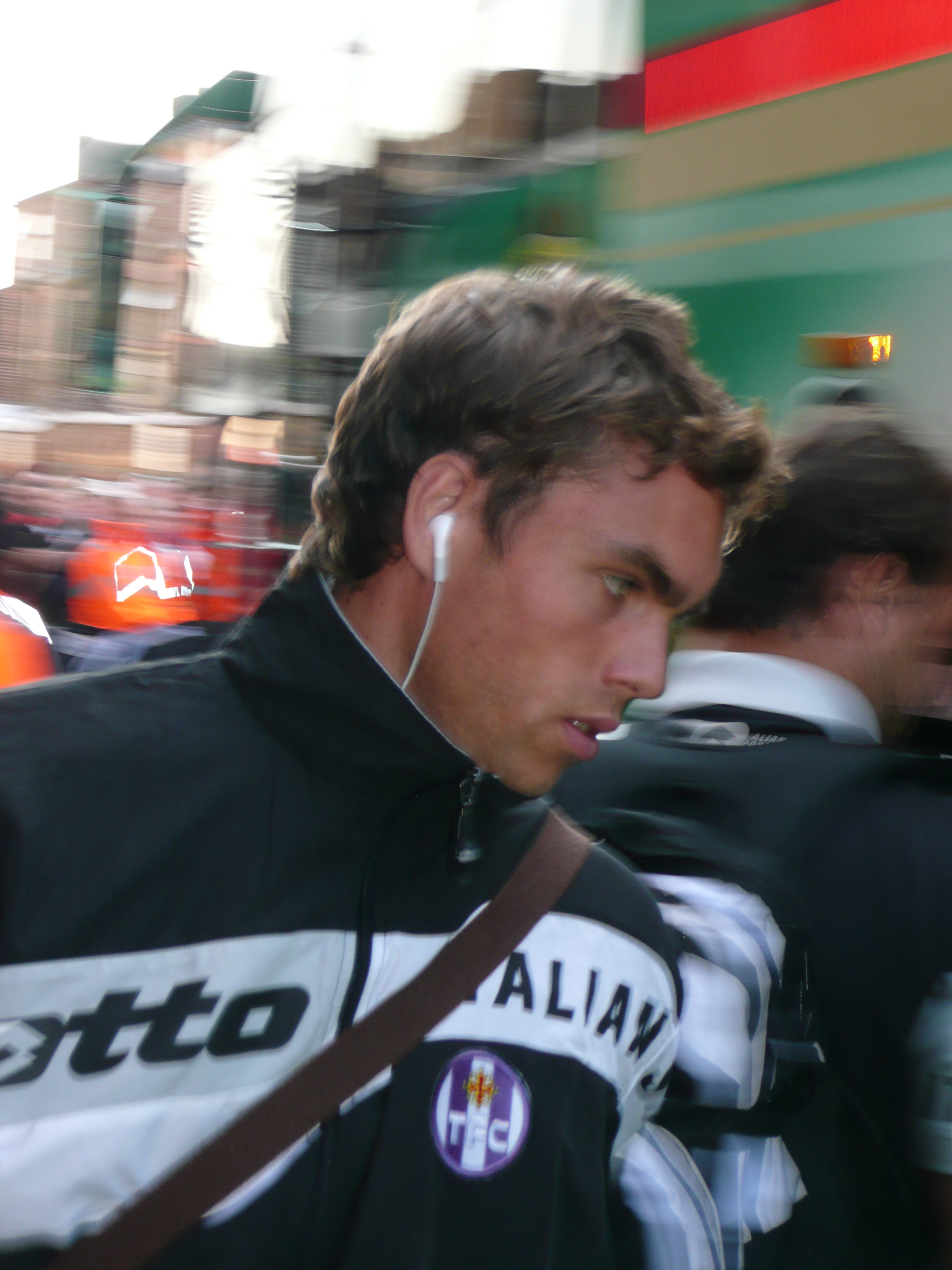
Bolton broke their transfer record in 2008 when they signed Swedish forward Johan Elmander

The 2007–08 season saw Bolton survive with a 16th-place finish, their safety being confirmed on the final day of the season, as they went on an unbeaten run for their final five games, as well as getting to the last sixteen of the UEFA Cup. Former assistant manager Sammy Lee replaced Allardyce as manager, but a poor start to the season saw him replaced by Gary Megson. During the European run, Bolton gained an unexpected 2–2 draw against former European champions Bayern Munich, as well as becoming the first English team to beat Red Star Belgrade in Belgrade. They also defeated Atlético Madrid on aggregate before being knocked out by Sporting Lisbon.

Bolton broke their record transfer fee with the signing of Johan Elmander from Toulouse on 27 June 2008, in a deal which cost the club a reported £8.2 million and saw Norwegian striker Daniel Braaten head in the opposite direction. Megson was replaced part-way through the 2009–2010 season by former Wanderers striker Owen Coyle, after Megson endured a difficult relationship with the fans. In the 2010–11 FA Cup, Bolton progressed all the way to the semi-finals, but were beaten 5–0 by Stoke at Wembley, with the match being described as "a massive anti-climax".

The following season began as the previous one had ended with just one win and six defeats, their worst start since the 1902–03 season when they were relegated. On 17 March 2012, manager Owen Coyle travelled to the London Chest Hospital with Fabrice Muamba who had suffered from a cardiac arrest whilst playing against Tottenham Hotspur at White Hart Lane in a FA Cup match. Muamba stayed in a critical condition for several weeks and Coyle was widely praised for the manner in which he represented the club during the period. That 13 May, Bolton were relegated to the Championship by one point on the last day of the season after drawing 2–2 with Stoke City.

=== Return to the Championship (2012–2018) ===
The 2012–13 Championship season started badly for Bolton, with only three wins in ten league matches and a second round exit from the League Cup following a loss at Crawley Town. As a result of poor performances leaving them in 16th place, Bolton sacked Coyle on 9 October 2012, replacing him with Crystal Palace's Dougie Freedman. They finished in seventh place, losing out on a play-off place to Leicester City on goal difference. The 2013–14 began with a trip to Turf Moor, in celebration of the 125th anniversary of the Football League. Freedman was dismissed after a poor run of results at the beginning of the 2014–2015 season; he was replaced by former Celtic manager Neil Lennon, who promptly won his first game in charge 1–0 away at Birmingham.

In December 2015, Bolton, who were £172.9 million in debt, were handed a winding-up petition from HM Revenue and Customs over unpaid taxes, and a transfer embargo for the following month's window. Much of this debt owed to former owner Eddie Davies was confirmed to have been written off in March 2018, to assist with the club's potential sale prospects. After ending a 17-game winless run, Lennon, who had been investigated by the club due to allegations about his personal life, said that the club had "been through hell". On 18 January 2016, the club avoided an immediate winding-up order after their case was adjourned until 22 February to give it time to either close a deal with a potential buyer or raise sufficient short-term funds from asset sales. The club was said to owe HM Revenue and Customs £2.2m. The financial situation had improved as a takeover bid by Dean Holdsworth's Sports Shield was successful in March 2016. Lennon was removed from his position for the final few games of the season, replaced by Academy manager Jimmy Phillips. On 9 April 2016, Bolton lost 4–1 away at Derby County to confirm their relegation to the third tier for the first time since 1993.

Under new manager Phil Parkinson, Bolton won promotion from League One at the first time of asking with a second-place finish. On 14 September 2017, the board announced that the embargo was over. Bolton started their first season back in the Championship poorly, only earning their first victory in October. Their form improved mid-season, however going into the final round of fixtures Bolton were in the relegation zone, needing a win to stand a chance of securing survival. They achieved this to finish 21st, narrowly avoiding relegation, having fought back from 2–1 down to win 3–2 at home against Nottingham Forest in the last ten minutes of their final match of the season.

=== Relegation and financial crisis (2018–2019) ===
Throughout the 2018–19 Championship season Bolton faced financial difficulties. On 12 September 2018, Bolton reached an agreement with their main creditor BluMarble Capital Ltd over an unpaid loan, avoiding administration and a points deduction from the EFL. Bolton were served a winding-up order on 27 September 2018 after failing to make a payment to HM Revenue and Customs. This was the fourth such petition the club had faced in the previous 14 months. After the collapse of the permanent signing of on-loan striker Christian Doidge, Forest Green Rovers commenced legal action over lost earnings. In February 2019, Bolton were again issued a winding-up petition by HMRC which was subsequently adjourned until the end of the season as their search for a new owner continued. The match against Brentford on 26 April was called off by the English Football League 16 hours before kick off after Bolton's players, supported by the Professional Footballers' Association, refused to play until they had received their unpaid wages; the EFL awarded the win to Brentford. The Bolton Whites Hotel, owned by Ken Anderson, was also issued with a winding-up petition in March 2019 (it closed on 1 May and went into administration on 14 May). The team was relegated to League One in April after a 23rd-place finish.

In May 2019, the club went into administration due to a £1.2m unpaid tax bill, incurring a 12-point penalty for the 2019–2020 season. Fildraw (former owner Eddie Davies' trust fund) appointed administrators from insolvency firm David Rubin and Partners. A 17 July statement from the Bolton players said that no-one at the club had been paid by owner Ken Anderson for 20 weeks, the training ground had no potable drinking water nor hot water for showers. Pre-season friendlies were cancelled as Bolton could not give assurances about fielding a competitive team.

Anderson failed to find a buyer before the start of the season, and Bolton started their opening League One game on 3 August at Wycombe Wanderers with only three contracted senior outfield players, and lost 2–0. A week later, Bolton fielded its youngest ever side, with an average age of 19, in a goalless home draw against Coventry City. Manager Phil Parkinson expressed concern about the welfare of the youth players used in all of Bolton's games, leading Bolton to postpone the game against Doncaster Rovers on 20 August but without informing either Doncaster or the EFL. Parkinson and assistant Steve Parkin resigned the following day, with academy manager Jimmy Phillips taking interim charge. On 26 August, it was announced that the takeover by Football Ventures had fallen through one day before the EFL deadline, potentially risking the club going into liquidation. After Bolton failed to meet that deadline, the suspension of its notice of withdrawal from the EFL was lifted; however, the club was not immediately expelled from the EFL – it was given until 12 September 2019 to meet all outstanding requirements of the League's insolvency policy.

=== Under new ownership (2019–) ===
On 28 August, Bolton announced that the club's sale to Football Ventures (Whites) Limited had been completed, with the administrator paying tribute to the Eddie Davies Trust and their legal team, and criticising Ken Anderson who had "used his position as a secured creditor to hamper and frustrate any deal that did not benefit him or suit his purposes." Days later, Keith Hill was announced as the new club manager. He signed nine players before the transfer deadline closed, and his first win came on 22 October, 2–0 against Bristol Rovers, Bolton's first win in 22 matches.

On 21 November 2019, Bolton were handed a five-point deduction, suspended for 18 months, and fined £70,000, half of which was suspended for 18 months, for failure to fulfil two fixtures (against Brentford and Doncaster). The points would not be deducted if Bolton fulfilled all fixtures during the 18-month period. An EFL appeal against what it saw as a "lenient" penalty was rejected by an arbitration panel in January 2020. On 9 June 2020, the EFL League One decided to end the 2019–20 season early due to the COVID-19 pandemic, causing bottom club Bolton Wanderers to go down to the fourth tier of English football for the first time since 1988 and only the second time in their history. Following relegation, the club announced that Keith Hill and assistant David Flitcroft would leave the club when their contracts expired at the end of June. Barrow manager Ian Evatt was appointed Hill's successor on 1 July 2020. Despite being in 17th place after 24 matches, Bolton orchestrated an impressive season turnaround under Evatt. They completed the 2020–21 League Two season in third place after a 4–1 win against Crawley Town on the final day – enough to secure automatic promotion to League One – and early in the 2021–22 season settled debts with unsecured creditors to remove the threat of a 15-point deduction.

In January 2022, it was confirmed that the club had received an emergency loan from The Future Fund, a financial support scheme set up during the COVID-19 pandemic. This was subsequently converted into shares of the club, with around 8% of shares now owned by the British Business Bank, an economic development bank developed and run by HM Government. Bolton ended the season in 9th place.

On 2 April 2023, Bolton won the 2023 EFL Trophy final 4–0 against Plymouth Argyle. Bolton finished fifth, qualifying for the play-offs, but lost to Barnsley 2–1 on aggregate. The following year, Evatt led Wanderers to a 3rd place finish, missing out on automatic promotion to Derby County, with a 3–3 draw away at Peterborough on the final day of the season. Bolton would again be facing Barnsley in the play-off semi-finals, this time Bolton would come out victorious, winning 5–4 on aggregate and qualifying for the 2024 EFL League One play-off final on 18 May, where they were beaten 2–0 by Oxford United. However, Bolton struggled in the 2024–25 season and Evatt left the club in January 2025, being replaced by Steven Schumacher.

Schumacher took over from interim Julian Darby who had won his two games in charge. Schumacher's first match as Bolton manager was on 1 February 2025 and ended as a 1–0 loss away at Reading. Schumacher would see out the remainder of a turbulent and disappointing 2024–25 campaign for Bolton, with the highlight of the season being a stoppage time winner from centre-back Chris Forino to win 1–0 away at local rivals Wigan on 1 April 2025, ending a 10-year wait for Bolton to win the derby.

The 2025–26 season season culminated in a 4–1 victory over Stockport County in the 2026 EFL League One play-off final at Wembley on 24 May.

== Colours and badge ==
Bolton Wanderers' home colours are white shirts with navy and red trim, traditionally worn with navy shorts and white socks. Their away kits have been varied over the years, with navy kits and yellow kits among the most popular and common. Bolton did not always wear a white kit; in 1884 they wore white with red spots, leading to the club's original nickname of "The Spots". The traditional navy blue shorts were dispensed with in 2003, in favour of an all-white strip, but they returned in 2008. The club had previously experimented with an all-white kit in the 1970s.

The Bolton Wanderers club badge consists of the initials of the club in the shape of a ball, with a red scroll and Lancashire rose underneath. They usually use blue initials on home kits, and white on away kits. The current badge is a reimagining of one designed in 1975; this was replaced in 2001 by a badge which retained the recognisable initials but controversially exchanged the scroll and rose for blue and red ribbons. The re-design has been welcomed by fans as the red rose returned to the badge and those who saw the ribbons as a poor choice. The original club badge was the town crest of Bolton, a key feature of which was the Elephant and Castle motif with the town motto – Supera Moras meaning "Overcome Delays". This feature has been reincorporated on the back of some more recent club shirts which was seen as a nice touch by some.

The club's nickname of "The Trotters" has several claimed derivations; that it is simply a variation on "Wanderers", that it is an old local term for a practical joker, or that one of the grounds used before the club settled at Pikes Lane resided next to a piggery, causing players to have to "trot" through the pig pens to retrieve the ball if it went over the fence.

== Grounds ==
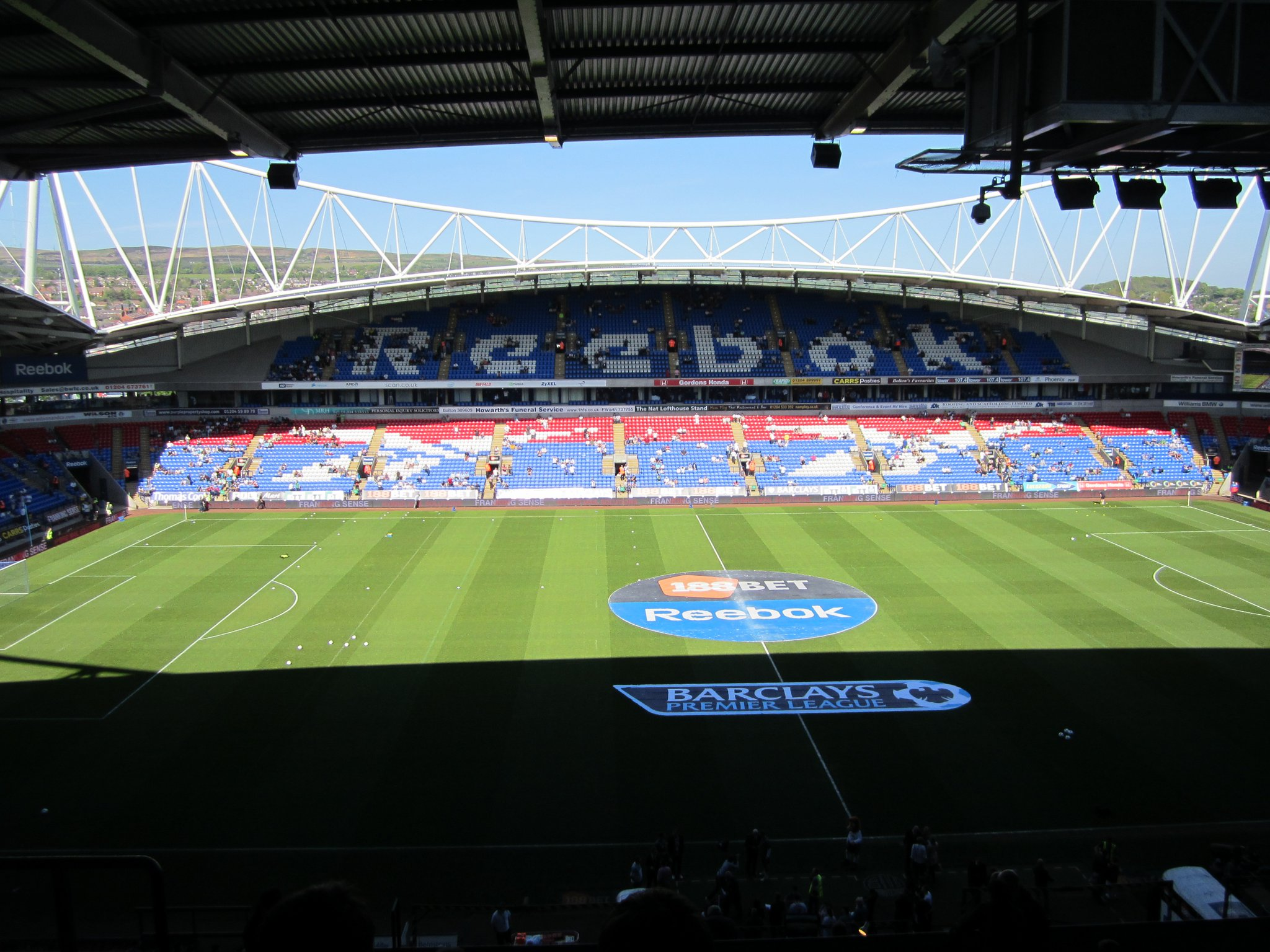
The Toughsheet Community Stadium has been Bolton Wanderers' home since 1997

When the club was first founded, Christ Church had a nomadic existence, playing at a number of locations in the area. The club, which had by then been renamed Bolton Wanderers, started playing regularly at Pike's Lane in 1881. Spending £150 on pitch improvements, season tickets cost a guinea. They played here for fourteen years until the tenancy expired and they moved to Burnden Park.

Situated in the Burnden area of Bolton, approximately one mile from the centre of the town, the ground served as the home of the town's football team for 102 years. In its heyday, Burnden Park could hold up to 70,000 supporters but this figure was dramatically reduced during the final 20 years of its life. A section of The Embankment was sold off in 1986 to make way for a new Normid superstore. At this time, Bolton were in a dire position financially and were struggling in the Football League Third Division, so there was a low demand for tickets and the loss of part of the ground gave the Bolton directors good value for money.

By 1992 the club's directors had decided that it would be difficult to convert Burnden Park into an all-seater stadium for a club of Bolton's ambition, as the Taylor Report required all first- and second-tier clubs to do. A decision was made to build an out of town stadium in the town of Horwich, with the eventual location chosen 5 miles due west of the town centre. The stadium opened in August 1997, as a modern, all-seater stadium with a capacity of around 29,000. In recognition of the club's former ground the stadium stands on "Burnden Way". It has four stands, though the lower-tier seating is one continuous bowl. It was originally known as the Reebok Stadium after long-time team sponsor, Reebok. This was initially unpopular with many fans, as it was considered impersonal, and that too much emphasis was being placed on financial considerations. This opposition considerably lessened since the stadium was built. In April 2014, the stadium was renamed as part of a four-year deal with new sponsors Macron sportswear. When this deal came to an end in August 2018 the stadium was again renamed, this time as the University of Bolton Stadium. In 2023, a new record-breaking stadium naming rights deal was announced with Bolton-based recyclable building products manufacturer Toughsheet, leading the stadium to be renamed the Toughsheet Community Stadium.

In 2014 the club established Bolton Wanderers Free School at the stadium, a sixth form offering sports and related courses for 16 to 19-year-olds. However, this was later closed in 2017 due to low pupil numbers which deemed it 'not financially viable'.

== Rivalries and supporters ==
Bolton Wanderers Supporters' Association (BWSA) is the official supporters' association of Bolton Wanderers Football Club. The Supporters' Association was formed in 1992, on the initiative of a fan, Peter Entwistle. Later that year the Directors of the football club, satisfied that the Association had proven itself to be organised and responsible, officially recognised Bolton Wanderers Supporters' Association as the club's supporters' group.

In 1997, shortly after the move from Burnden Park to the Reebok Stadium, the BWSA accepted the invitation from the football club to hold its monthly meetings at the new stadium. The Toughsheet Community Stadium has continued to be their venue ever since. In the year 2000, the Association expanded significantly when its invitation to affiliate was accepted by Bolton Wanderers supporters groups in other parts of Britain, and also by groups around the world. All of these foreign groups have come on board to become independent, but integral, parts of the official Bolton Wanderers supporters' family. Requests for affiliated status continue to be received regularly from other places around the world where Wanderers fans find themselves gather together.

Historically Bolton's traditional rivals were near neighbours Bury, though due to limited league meetings and Bury's expulsion from the Football League in August 2019 matches between the two have not happened in a while. The club also has traditional rivalries with fellow Lancashire clubs Blackburn Rovers, Burnley and Preston North End, as all three sides are separated by less than 20 miles and are all founder members of the Football League. More recently, Bolton have developed an enmity with Wigan Athletic, whose fans generally regard Bolton as their main rivals. Wigan eventually became known as Bolton biggest rivals, and crowd trouble marred the 16 October 2021 meeting between the two clubs. A study in 2021 found that the Bolton/Wigan rivalry was one of the more competitive in English football, with both teams having an identical record against each other at the time.

According to a survey conducted in August 2019 entitled 'The League of Love and Hate', Bolton supporters named Manchester United, Blackburn Rovers, Wigan Athletic, Oldham Athletic and Bury as their biggest rivals.

== Ownership and finances ==
The holding company of Bolton Wanderers F.C. is Burnden Leisure Ltd, a private company limited by shares. Burnden Leisure was previously a public company traded on the AIM international market until its voluntary delisting in May 2003 following Eddie Davies's takeover. The club itself is 100% owned by Burnden Leisure; businessman Davies owned 94.5% of the shares, with the remaining stakes held by over 6,000 small shareholders with less than 0.1% holding each. After Bolton exited the Premier League, Davies revoked his investment into the club. This led to published debts of almost £200m and brought the club very close to being wound up over unpaid tax bills owed to HMRC. As a gesture of his goodwill and as incentive to sell the club, Davies promised to wipe over £125m of debt owed to him when the club was sold, which wiped a significant proportion of debt the club owed.

In March 2016, Sports Shield, a consortium led by Dean Holdsworth, bought Davies' controlling stake; a year later, Holdsworth shareholding in Sports Shield was bought out by Ken Anderson. Under Anderson, financial difficulties dogged the club, with player strikes, further winding up orders and financial disputes with other creditors. These culminated in the club (Burnden Leisure Ltd) going into administration in May 2019, and, with the club's future ownership unresolved, being threatened with expulsion from the EFL in August 2019. On 28 August, the club was sold to Football Ventures (Whites) Ltd despite opposition from Ken Anderson.

In January 2022, it was confirmed that the club had received an emergency loan from The Future Fund, a financial support scheme set up during the COVID-19 pandemic. This was subsequently converted into shares of the club, with around 8% of shares now owned by the British Business Bank, an economic development bank developed and run by HM Government.

=== Sponsorship ===
Bolton Wanderers had a long-established partnership with sporting goods firm Reebok, which was formed in the town. Between 1997 and 2009 this partnership encompassed shirt sponsorship, kit manufacture and stadium naming rights. The combined shirt sponsorship (1990–2009) and kit manufacture (1993–2012) deals covering 22 years represent the longest kit partnership in English football history. The stadium's naming rights were held by Reebok from its opening in 1997 until 2014.

Bolton's kit manufacturer from the 2014–15 season changed to Italian sportswear brand Macron, who also became stadium name sponsors for four years. In August 2018, the stadium naming rights went to the University of Bolton in an undisclosed deal. From 1 July 2023 it became known as the Toughsheet Community Stadium.

== Current squad ==
As of 18 November 2026

Note: Flags indicate national team as defined under FIFA eligibility rules; some limited exceptions apply. Players may hold more than one non-FIFA nationality.

No.	Pos.	Nation	Player
1	GK	IRL	Jack Bonham
3	DF	LCA	Chris Forino-Joseph (vice-captain)
4	MF	ENG	Xavier Simons
5	DF	ENG	Lewis Brunt
6	DF	ENG	Ben Davies
7	FW	FRA	Kyliane Dong (on loan from Augsburg)
8	MF	WAL	Josh Sheehan
9	FW	CAN	Theo Bair (on loan from Auxerre)
10	FW	ENG	Sam Dalby
11	FW	BRB	Thierry Gale
12	MF	SCO	David Watson
13	GK	ENG	Nathan Broome
14	DF	ENG	Akin Famewo

No.	Pos.	Nation	Player
16	FW	ENG	Samuel Iling-Junior (on loan from Aston Villa)
17	MF	JPN	Atsuki Itō
18	DF	NIR	Eoin Toal (captain)
20	MF	POR	Rúben Rodrigues
21	MF	SCO	Ethan Erhahon
22	DF	ESP	Gaizka Larrazabal
23	GK	IRL	David Harrington
25	DF	ENG	Max Conway
26	FW	CAN	Jayden Nelson
27	DF	ENG	Luca Stephenson
31	GK	IRL	Gavin Bazunu
39	FW	SCO	Ryan Hardie (on loan from Wrexham)
45	FW	ENG	John McAtee

=== Bolton U21 squad ===
As of 26 October 2026

Note: Flags indicate national team as defined under FIFA eligibility rules; some limited exceptions apply. Players may hold more than one non-FIFA nationality.

No.	Pos.	Nation	Player
35	MF	ENG	Max Lott
54	FW	ENG	Toby Ritchie
—	GK	ENG	Luke Lomax
—	DF	IRL	Jack Mawditt
—	DF	ENG	Sam O'Neill
—	DF	ENG	Emile Oliver
—	DF	ENG	Charlie Paye

No.	Pos.	Nation	Player
—	DF	ENG	Harrison Rice
—	DF	ENG	Finn Wilkinson
—	MF	ENG	Harley Irwin
—	FW	ENG	Tom King
—	FW	ENG	Daeshon Lawrence
—	FW	ENG	Conor Lewis

=== Out on loan ===
Note: Flags indicate national team as defined under FIFA eligibility rules; some limited exceptions apply. Players may hold more than one non-FIFA nationality.

No.	Pos.	Nation	Player
32	DF	NIR	Sam Inwood (at Swindon Town until 31 May 2027)
33	FW	ENG	Charlie Warren (at Accrington Stanley until 31 May 2027)
—	DF	ENG	Richard Taylor (at Bromley until 31 May 2027)
—	DF	IRL	Lewis Temple (at Oldham Athletic until 31 May 2027)

No.	Pos.	Nation	Player
—	MF	ENG	Lucas Kirkpatrick (at FC United of Manchester until 23 November 2026)
—	MF	ENG	Harry Leigh (at Ashton United until 23 November 2026)
—	MF	ENG	Joel Randall (at Chesterfield until 31 May 2027)

== Club officials ==
Bolton Wanderers Football & Athletic Co management

Role	Name
Chairman	Sharon Brittan
Chief Executive Officer	David Ray
Sporting Director	Fergal Harkin
Head of Recruitment	Jimmy Dickinson
Head Coach	Steven Schumacher
Assistant Head Coach	Richie Kyle
Assistant Coaches	Mark Hughes; Rob Kelly
Head of Goalkeeping	Owain Fôn Williams
U21 Head Coach	Julian Darby
U21 Coach	Andrew Tutte
Head of Academy	Dave Gardiner
U18 Head Coach	Danny Clarke
U18 Coach	Andy Parrish
Academy Goalkeeping Coach	Mackenzie Chapman
Head Physiotherapist	Matt Barrass
Academy Physiotherapists	Alice Pier; Samantha Lovett; Oliver Howard; Michael Eachus; Rebecca Pitts
Head of Sport Science	Paul Walsh
First Team Strength & Conditioning Coach	Vacant
Academy Strength & Conditioning Coach	Oliver Mercer
Kit & Equipment Manager	Phil Newham
Assistant Kit & Equipment Manager	Ciaran Marland
First Team Analysts	Richard Bredice; Kevin Mulligan
Academy Analyst	Matt Stephens

== Honours ==
League

- Second Division / First Division (level 2)
  - Champions: 1908–09, 1977–78, 1996–97
  - 2nd place promotion: 1899–1900, 1904–05, 1910–11, 1934–35
  - Play-off winners: 1995, 2001
- Third Division / Football League Second Division / League One (level 3)
  - Champions: 1972–73
  - 2nd place promotion: 1992–93, 2016–17
  - Play-off winners: 2026
- Fourth Division / League Two (level 4)
  - 3rd place promotion: 1987–88, 2020–21

Cup

- FA Cup
  - Winners: 1922–23, 1925–26, 1928–29, 1957–58
  - Runners-up: 1893–94, 1903–04, 1952–53
- Football League Cup
  - Runners-up: 1994–95, 2003–04
- FA Charity Shield
  - Winners: 1958
- Associate Members' Cup / EFL Trophy
  - Winners: 1988–89, 2022–23
  - Runners-up: 1985–86
- Football League War Cup
  - Winners: 1945
