= 1928–29 FA Cup =

Tournament details
- Country: England; Wales

Final positions
- Champions: Bolton Wanderers (3rd title)
- Runners-up: Portsmouth

The 1928–29 FA Cup was the 54th season of the world's oldest football cup competition, the Football Association Challenge Cup, commonly known as the FA Cup. Bolton Wanderers won the competition for the third time, beating Portsmouth 2–0 in the final at Wembley.

Matches were scheduled to be played at the stadium of the team named first on the date specified for each round, which was always a Saturday. Some matches, however, might be rescheduled for other days if there were clashes with games for other competitions or the weather was inclement. If scores were level after 90 minutes had been played, a replay would take place at the stadium of the second-named team later the same week. If the replayed match was drawn further replays would be held until a winner was determined. If scores were level after 90 minutes had been played in a replay, a 30-minute period of extra time would be played.

== Calendar ==
Round	Date
Extra preliminary round	Saturday 1 September 1928
Preliminary round	Saturday 15 September 1928
First round qualifying	Saturday 29 September 1928
Second round qualifying	Saturday 13 October 1928
Third round qualifying	Saturday 27 October 1928
Fourth round qualifying	Saturday 10 November 1928
First round proper	Saturday 24 November 1928
Second round proper	Saturday 8 December 1928
Third round proper	Saturday 12 January 1929
Fourth round proper	Saturday 26 January 1929
Fifth round proper	Saturday 16 February 1929
Sixth round proper	Saturday 2 March 1929
Semi-finals	Saturday 23 March 1929
Final	Saturday 27 April 1929

== Qualifying rounds ==
Most participating clubs that were not members of the Football League joined the competition in the qualifying rounds.

The 25 winners from the fourth qualifying round were Scarborough, Annfield Plain, York City, Spennymoor United, Lancaster Town, Horwich RMI, Rhyl Athletic, Gainsborough Trinity, Mansfield Town, Shirebrook, Grantham, Worcester City, Peterborough & Fletton United, Wellingborough Town, Kettering Town, Southall, Ilford, Barking Town, Chatham, Sittingbourne, Dulwich Hamlet, Guildford City, Woking, Poole and Yeovil & Petter's United.

Those featuring at this stage for the first time were Lancaster Town, Horwich RMI, Wellingborough Town, Guildford City and Yeovil & Petter's United, while Scarborough and Grantham had not appeared in the main competition since 1887-88.

Worcester City was the most successful club from this season's extra preliminary round, defeating Whitchurch, Stourbridge, Leamington Town, Oakengates Town, Stafford Rangers and Wellington Town before going out to Walsall in the first round proper.

== First round proper ==
At this stage 41 clubs from the Football League Third Division North and South joined the 25 non-league clubs who came through the qualifying rounds. Northampton Town and Swindon Town were given byes to the third round, while Nelson did not enter the competition this season. To make the number of matches up, non-league sides Northfleet United and Leyton were given byes to this round, with Leyton again having won the previous season's FA Amateur Cup.

34 matches were scheduled to be played on Saturday, 24 November 1928. One match was drawn and went to a replay in the following midweek fixture.

Tie no	Home team	Score	Away team	Date
1	Chesterfield	3–2	Rochdale	24 November 1928
2	Darlington	3–0	New Brighton	24 November 1928
3	Grantham	1–0	Rhyl Athletic	24 November 1928
4	Walsall	3–1	Worcester City	24 November 1928
5	Gillingham	0–0	Torquay United	24 November 1928
Replay	Torquay United	5–1	Gillingham	28 November 1928
6	Leyton	0–2	Watford	24 November 1928
7	Luton Town	5–1	Southend United	24 November 1928
8	Gainsborough Trinity	3–1	Crewe Alexandra	24 November 1928
9	Wrexham	0–1	Carlisle United	24 November 1928
10	Poole	1–4	Bournemouth & Boscombe Athletic	24 November 1928
11	Tranmere Rovers	2–1	Rotherham United	24 November 1928
12	Stockport County	1–0	Halifax Town	24 November 1928
13	Sittingbourne	2–1	Southall	24 November 1928
14	Accrington Stanley	2–1	South Shields	24 November 1928
15	Brentford	4–1	Brighton & Hove Albion	24 November 1928
16	Bristol Rovers	2–1	Wellingborough Town	24 November 1928
17	Coventry City	1–4	Fulham	24 November 1928
18	Norwich City	6–1	Chatham	24 November 1928
19	Northfleet United	5–2	Ilford	24 November 1928
20	Bradford City	4–1	Doncaster Rovers	24 November 1928
21	Crystal Palace	2–0	Kettering Town	24 November 1928
22	Spennymoor United	5–2	Hartlepools United	24 November 1928
23	Annfield Plain	1–4	Southport	24 November 1928
24	Lancaster Town	1–3	Lincoln City	24 November 1928
25	Exeter City	6–0	Barking Town	24 November 1928
26	Merthyr Town	4–2	Dulwich Hamlet	24 November 1928
27	Shirebrook	2–4	Mansfield Town	24 November 1928
28	Newport County	7–0	Woking	24 November 1928
29	Horwich RMI	1–2	Scarborough	24 November 1928
30	Yeovil & Petter's United	1–4	Plymouth Argyle	24 November 1928
31	Wigan Borough	2–0	Ashington	24 November 1928
32	York City	0–1	Barrow	24 November 1928
33	Peterborough & Fletton United	0–2	Charlton Athletic	24 November 1928
34	Guildford City	4–2	Queens Park Rangers	24 November 1928

== Second round proper ==
The matches were played on Saturday, 8 December 1928. Two matches were drawn, with replays taking place in the following midweek fixture.

Tie no	Home team	Score	Away team	Date
1	Barrow	1–2	Mansfield Town	8 December 1928
2	Watford	2–0	Merthyr Town	8 December 1928
3	Walsall	2–1	Sittingbourne	8 December 1928
4	Gainsborough Trinity	2–3	Chesterfield	8 December 1928
5	Scarborough	2–2	Darlington	8 December 1928
Replay	Darlington	2–1	Scarborough	12 December 1928
6	Tranmere Rovers	0–1	Bradford City	8 December 1928
7	Stockport County	3–0	Southport	8 December 1928
8	Fulham	0–0	Luton Town	8 December 1928
Replay	Luton Town	4–1	Fulham	13 December 1928
9	Accrington Stanley	7–0	Spennymoor United	8 December 1928
10	Brentford	0–1	Plymouth Argyle	8 December 1928
11	Norwich City	6–0	Newport County	8 December 1928
12	Northfleet United	1–5	Charlton Athletic	8 December 1928
13	Carlisle United	0–1	Lincoln City	8 December 1928
14	Crystal Palace	3–1	Bristol Rovers	8 December 1928
15	Torquay United	0–1	Exeter City	8 December 1928
16	Wigan Borough	2–1	Grantham	8 December 1928
17	Guildford City	1–5	Bournemouth & Boscombe Athletic	8 December 1928

== Third round proper ==
The 44 First and Second Division clubs entered the competition at this stage, along with Northampton Town, Swindon Town and amateur side Corinthian. The matches were scheduled for Saturday, 12 January 1929. Eight matches were drawn and went to replays in the following midweek fixture, of which one went to a second replay.

Tie no	Home team	Score	Away team	Date
1	Birmingham	3–1	Manchester City	12 January 1929
2	Chesterfield	1–7	Huddersfield Town	12 January 1929
3	Darlington	2–6	Bury	12 January 1929
4	Bristol City	0–2	Liverpool	12 January 1929
5	Burnley	2–1	Sheffield United	12 January 1929
6	Southampton	0–0	Clapton Orient	12 January 1929
Replay	Clapton Orient	2–1	Southampton	17 January 1929
7	Watford	1–0	Preston North End	12 January 1929
8	Reading	2–0	Tottenham Hotspur	12 January 1929
9	Walsall	1–1	Middlesbrough	12 January 1929
Replay	Middlesbrough	5–1	Walsall	21 January 1929
10	Nottingham Forest	1–2	Swansea Town	12 January 1929
11	Blackburn Rovers	1–0	Barnsley	12 January 1929
12	Aston Villa	6–1	Cardiff City	12 January 1929
13	Bolton Wanderers	2–0	Oldham Athletic	12 January 1929
14	Grimsby Town	1–1	West Bromwich Albion	12 January 1929
Replay	West Bromwich Albion	2–0	Grimsby Town	16 January 1929
15	Wolverhampton Wanderers	0–1	Mansfield Town	12 January 1929
16	Derby County	4–3	Notts County	12 January 1929
17	Lincoln City	0–1	Leicester City	12 January 1929
18	Luton Town	0–0	Crystal Palace	12 January 1929
Replay	Crystal Palace	7–0	Luton Town	16 January 1929
19	Swindon Town	2–0	Newcastle United	12 January 1929
20	Accrington Stanley	1–1	Bournemouth & Boscombe Athletic	12 January 1929
Replay	Bournemouth & Boscombe Athletic	2–0	Accrington Stanley	16 January 1929
21	Portsmouth	2–1	Charlton Athletic	12 January 1929
22	West Ham United	1–0	Sunderland	12 January 1929
23	Norwich City	0–5	Corinthian	12 January 1929
24	Plymouth Argyle	3–0	Blackpool	12 January 1929
25	Bradford City	2–0	Stockport County	12 January 1929
26	Millwall	1–1	Northampton Town	12 January 1929
Replay	Northampton Town	2–2	Millwall	17 January 1929
Replay	Millwall	2–0	Northampton Town	21 January 1929
27	Hull City	1–1	Bradford Park Avenue	12 January 1929
Replay	Bradford Park Avenue	3–1	Hull City	16 January 1929
28	Chelsea	2–0	Everton	12 January 1929
29	Exeter City	2–2	Leeds United	12 January 1929
Replay	Leeds United	5–1	Exeter City	16 January 1929
30	Port Vale	0–3	Manchester United	12 January 1929
31	Arsenal	2–1	Stoke City	12 January 1929
32	Wigan Borough	1–3	The Wednesday	12 January 1929

== Fourth round proper ==
The matches were scheduled for Saturday, 26 January 1929. Five games were drawn and went to replays in the following midweek fixture. Mansfield Town and Corinthian were the only non-league clubs remaining in the competition at this stage.

Tie no	Home team	Score	Away team	Date
1	Bournemouth & Boscombe Athletic	6–4	Watford	26 January 1929
2	Burnley	3–3	Swindon Town	26 January 1929
Replay	Swindon Town	3–2	Burnley	31 January 1929
3	Liverpool	0–0	Bolton Wanderers	26 January 1929
Replay	Bolton Wanderers	5–2	Liverpool	31 January 1929
4	Reading	1–0	The Wednesday	26 January 1929
5	Leicester City	1–0	Swansea Town	26 January 1929
6	Blackburn Rovers	1–1	Derby County	26 January 1929
Replay	Derby County	0–3	Blackburn Rovers	31 January 1929
7	Aston Villa	0–0	Clapton Orient	26 January 1929
Replay	Clapton Orient	0–8	Aston Villa	31 January 1929
8	West Bromwich Albion	1–0	Middlesbrough	26 January 1929
9	Portsmouth	2–0	Bradford City	26 January 1929
10	West Ham United	3–0	Corinthian	26 January 1929
11	Manchester United	0–1	Bury	26 January 1929
12	Plymouth Argyle	0–1	Bradford Park Avenue	26 January 1929
13	Millwall	0–0	Crystal Palace	26 January 1929
Replay	Crystal Palace	5–3	Millwall	31 January 1929
14	Chelsea	1–0	Birmingham	26 January 1929
15	Huddersfield Town	3–0	Leeds United	26 January 1929
16	Arsenal	2–0	Mansfield Town	26 January 1929

== Fifth round proper ==
The matches were scheduled for Saturday, 16 February 1929. There were three replays played in the next midweek fixture.

Tie no	Home team	Score	Away team	Date
1	Bournemouth & Boscombe Athletic	1–1	West Ham United	16 February 1929
Replay	West Ham United	3–1	Bournemouth & Boscombe Athletic	20 February 1929
2	Reading	1–3	Aston Villa	16 February 1929
3	Leicester City	1–2	Bolton Wanderers	16 February 1929
4	Blackburn Rovers	1–0	Bury	16 February 1929
5	West Bromwich Albion	6–0	Bradford Park Avenue	16 February 1929
6	Swindon Town	0–0	Arsenal	16 February 1929
Replay	Arsenal	1–0	Swindon Town	20 February 1929
7	Chelsea	1–1	Portsmouth	16 February 1929
Replay	Portsmouth	1–0	Chelsea	20 February 1929
8	Huddersfield Town	5–2	Crystal Palace	16 February 1929

== Sixth round proper ==
The four quarter-final ties were scheduled to be played on Saturday, 2 March 1929. There were two replays.

Tie no	Home team	Score	Away team	Date
1	Blackburn Rovers	1–1	Bolton Wanderers	2 March 1929
Replay	Bolton Wanderers	2–1	Blackburn Rovers	6 March 1929
2	Aston Villa	1–0	Arsenal	2 March 1929
3	West Bromwich Albion	1–1	Huddersfield Town	2 March 1929
Replay	Huddersfield Town	2–1	West Bromwich Albion	6 March 1929
4	Portsmouth	3–2	West Ham United	2 March 1929

== Semi-finals ==
The semi-final matches were played on Saturday, 23 March 1929. Bolton Wanderers and Portsmouth won their matches to meet in the final at Wembley.

23 March 1929
15:00

Bolton Wanderers	3–1	Huddersfield Town

Anfield, Liverpool

23 March 1929
15:00

Portsmouth	1–0	Aston Villa

Highbury, London

== Final ==
The 1929 FA Cup Final was contested by Bolton Wanderers and Portsmouth at Wembley. Bolton won 2–0, with goals by Billy Butler and Harry Blackmore.

=== Match details ===
27 April 1929
15:00 BST

Bolton Wanderers	2–0	Portsmouth
Butler 79'; Blackmore 87'	(Report)

Wembley, London
Attendance: 92,576
Referee: A. Josephs, South Shields

Bolton Wanderers	Portsmouth

== See also ==
- FA Cup Final Results 1872-
