= List of Bolton Wanderers F.C. players =

Bolton Wanderers Football Club is an English professional football club based in Horwich, Greater Manchester. The club was formed in Bolton in 1874 as Christ Church F.C. and was renamed Bolton Wanderers F.C. in 1877. They played their first competitive match in October 1881, when they entered the First Round of the 1881–82 FA Cup. The club moved to Burnden Park in 1895 and the Reebok Stadium in 1997. Since playing their first competitive match, 173 players have made at least 100 appearances (including substitute appearances); those players are listed here.

Bolton Wanderers's record appearance-maker is Eddie Hopkinson, who made more than 570 appearances between 1952 and 1970. The club's leading scorer is Nat Lofthouse with 285 goals in his 14 years with the club. Along with Hopkinson and Lofthouse, seven other players have made more than 500 appearances. Other than Lofthouse, only Joe Smith has scored more than 200 goals for the club.

== List of players ==
Table headers

- Apps — Number of games played as a starter
- Sub — Number of games played as a substitute
- Total — Total number of games played, both as a starter and as a substitute

Positions key
| GK | Goalkeeper | RB | Right back | RM | Right midfielder | RW | Right winger |
| CB | Central back | LB | Left back | LM | Left midfielder | LW | Left winger |
| DF | Defender | FB | Fullback | MF | Midfielder | W | Winger |
| FW | Forward | HB | Half back | CM | Central midfielder | U | Utility |

Statistics correct as of match played 21 November 2026

| Name | Nationality | Position | Bolton Wanderers career | Apps | Sub | Total | Goals |
|---|---|---|---|---|---|---|---|
| Di Jones | Wales | FB | 1888–1898 | 255 | 0 | 255 | 8 |
| John Somerville | Scotland | RB | 1890–1901 | 293 | 0 | 293 | 2 |
| Bob Brown | Scotland | DF | 1895–1901 | 136 | 0 | 136 | 14 |
| Jim Cassidy | Scotland | FW | 1889–1898 | 219 | 0 | 219 | 101 |
| Bob Jack | Scotland | W | 1895–1901 | 125 | 0 | 125 | 29 |
| Jocky Wright | Scotland | FW | 1895–1898; 1902–1904 | 128 | 0 | 128 | 22 |
| Walter White | Scotland | FW | 1902–1908 | 217 | 0 | 217 | 93 |
| Sam Marsh | England | FW | 1902–1912 | 201 | 0 | 201 | 81 |
| Bert Baverstock | England | FB | 1905–1921 | 388 | 0 | 388 | 4 |
| Marshall McEwan | Scotland | W | 1905–1910 | 164 | 0 | 164 | 15 |
| Joe Smith | England | FW | 1908–1927 | 492 | 0 | 492 | 277 |
| Ted Vizard | Wales | LW | 1910–1931 | 512 | 0 | 512 | 70 |
| Alex Donaldson | Scotland | FW | 1912–1921 | 146 | 0 | 146 | 6 |
| Billy Jennings | Wales | MF | 1912–1930 | 287 | 0 | 287 | 2 |
| Tom Buchan | England | MF | 1914–1922 | 117 | 0 | 117 | 14 |
| Jimmy Seddon | England | CB | 1919–1932 | 375 | 0 | 375 | 5 |
| David Jack | England | FW | 1920–1928 | 324 | 0 | 324 | 161 |
| Billy Butler | England | RW | 1920–1933 | 449 | 0 | 449 | 74 |
| Dick Pym | England | GK | 1921–1931 | 336 | 0 | 336 | 0 |
| Harry Nuttall | England | FB | 1921–1932 | 326 | 0 | 326 | 6 |
| Jack Smith | Scotland | FW | 1922–1928 | 174 | 0 | 174 | 87 |
| Billy Wright | England | RM | 1922–1933 | 159 | 0 | 159 | 22 |
| Alex Finney | England | FB | 1922–1937 | 530 | 0 | 530 | 2 |
| George Gibson | Scotland | FW | 1927–1933 | 255 | 0 | 255 | 81 |
| Willie Cook | Scotland | MF | 1928–1935 | 262 | 0 | 262 | 40 |
| Harry Goslin | England | DF | 1930–1939 | 334 | 0 | 334 | 23 |
| George Taylor | England | LH | 1930–1939 | 220 | 3 | 244 | 3 |
| Ray Westwood | England | FW | 1930–1947 | 333 | 0 | 333 | 144 |
| John Atkinson | England | DF | 1931–1948 | 263 | 0 | 263 | 5 |
| Tom Woodward | England | MF | 1935–1949 | 169 | 0 | 169 | 19 |
| Stan Hanson | England | GK | 1935–1955 | 423 | 0 | 423 | 0 |
| Don Howe | England | W | 1936–1952 | 286 | 0 | 286 | 35 |
| Jackie Roberts | Wales | MF | 1936–1950 | 171 | 0 | 171 | 19 |
| Harry Hubbick | England | DF | 1937–1947 | 144 | 0 | 144 | 0 |
| Ralph Banks | England | DF | 1940–1954 | 118 | 0 | 118 | 0 |
| Matt Gillies | Scotland | DF | 1942–1952 | 154 | 0 | 154 | 1 |
| Willie Moir | Scotland | U | 1943–1955 | 358 | 0 | 358 | 134 |
| Malcolm Barrass | England | U | 1944–1956 | 357 | 0 | 357 | 27 |
| Nat Lofthouse | England | FW | 1946–1960 | 503 | 0 | 503 | 285 |
| Bryan Edwards | England | RB | 1947–1965 | 518 | 0 | 518 | 9 |
| Tommy Banks | England | DF | 1947–1961 | 255 | 0 | 255 | 2 |
| Derek Hennin | England | RW | 1949–1961 | 183 | 0 | 183 | 9 |
| Bobby Langton | England | MF | 1949–1953 | 132 | 0 | 132 | 18 |
| John Ball | England | DF | 1950–1958 | 212 | 0 | 212 | 2 |
| Doug Holden | England | WH | 1950–1962 | 463 | 0 | 463 | 44 |
| Dennis Stevens | England | FW | 1950–1962 | 310 | 0 | 310 | 101 |
| Johnny Wheeler | England | WH | 1951–1956 | 205 | 0 | 205 | 18 |
| Roy Hartle | England | DF | 1951–1966 | 498 | 1 | 499 | 13 |
| Eddie Hopkinson | England | GK | 1952–1970 | 578 | 0 | 578 | 0 |
| Harold Hassall | England | FW | 1952–1955 | 109 | 0 | 109 | 34 |
| John Higgins | England | CB | 1952–1961 | 202 | 0 | 202 | 0 |
| Ray Parry | England | MF | 1953–1960 | 299 | 0 | 299 | 79 |
| Brian Birch | England | MF | 1955–1964 | 191 | 0 | 191 | 28 |
| Graham Stanley | England | DF | 1955–1965 | 161 | 0 | 161 | 4 |
| Fred Hill | England | FW | 1957–1969 | 410 | 2 | 412 | 79 |
| Syd Farrimond | England | DF | 1958–1971 | 403 | 1 | 404 | 1 |
| Warwick Rimmer | England | DF | 1958–1975 | 521 | 7 | 528 | 17 |
| Francis Lee | England | FW | 1959–1967 | 210 | 0 | 210 | 106 |
| Dave Hatton | England | U | 1961–1969 | 259 | 0 | 259 | 8 |
| Dave Lennard | England | DF | 1961–1969 | 121 | 5 | 126 | 3 |
| Wyn Davies | Wales | FW | 1962–1966 | 170 | 0 | 170 | 74 |
| Gordon Taylor | England | RW | 1962–1970 | 281 | 5 | 286 | 46 |
| John Hulme | England | DF | 1962–1972 | 213 | 2 | 215 | 9 |
| Brian Bromley | England | MF | 1963–1968 | 183 | 1 | 184 | 26 |
| Roy Greaves | England | U | 1965–1980 | 567 | 8 | 575 | 85 |
| Ronnie Phillips | England | MF | 1965–1975 | 160 | 15 | 175 | 19 |
| John Byrom | England | FW | 1966–1976 | 340 | 11 | 351 | 130 |
| John Ritson | England | RB | 1966–1978 | 375 | 3 | 378 | 13 |
| Gareth Williams | England | MF | 1967–1971 | 116 | 1 | 117 | 12 |
| Terry Wharton | England | MF | 1967–1971 | 108 | 2 | 110 | 30 |
| Garry Jones | England | MF | 1968–1975 | 236 | 11 | 247 | 55 |
| Alan Waldron | England | MF | 1969–1977 | 153 | 17 | 170 | 9 |
| Paul Jones | England | CB | 1970–1983 | 502 | 4 | 506 | 43 |
| Don McAllister | England | DF | 1970–1975 | 176 | 1 | 177 | 2 |
| Peter Nicholson | England | RB | 1971–1982 | 352 | 18 | 370 | 14 |
| Barry Siddall | England | GK | 1972–1976 | 158 | 0 | 158 | 0 |
| Tony Dunne | Republic of Ireland | LB | 1973–1979 | 189 | 4 | 193 | 0 |
| Sam Allardyce | England | CB | 1973–1980; 1985–1986 | 226 | 5 | 231 | 24 |
| Peter Thompson | England | LW | 1973–1978 | 126 | 6 | 132 | 2 |
| Neil Whatmore | England | FW | 1973–1981; 1982–1983; 1983–1984; 1987–1988 | 322 | 16 | 338 | 121 |
| Peter Reid | England | MF | 1974–1982 | 257 | 4 | 261 | 25 |
| Mike Walsh | England | CB | 1974–1981 | 192 | 9 | 201 | 5 |
| Jim McDonagh | Republic of Ireland | GK | 1976–1980; 1981–1983 | 274 | 0 | 274 | 1 |
| Willie Morgan | Scotland | RW | 1976–1980 | 177 | 2 | 179 | 12 |
| David Burke | England | LB | 1977–1981; 1990–1994 | 208 | 8 | 216 | 2 |
| Alan Gowling | England | FW | 1978–1982 | 163 | 2 | 165 | 31 |
| David Hoggan | England | MF | 1979–1983 | 93 | 11 | 104 | 15 |
| Gerry McElhinney | Northern Ireland | DF | 1980–1985 | 125 | 2 | 127 | 2 |
| Simon Farnworth | England | GK | 1981–1986 | 139 | 1 | 140 | 0 |
| Steve Thompson | England | MF | 1982–1991 | 416 | 6 | 422 | 57 |
| Ray Deakin | England | DF | 1982–1985 | 120 | 1 | 121 | 2 |
| Warren Joyce | England | MF | 1983–1987 | 216 | 5 | 221 | 21 |
| Jimmy Phillips | England | MF | 1983–1987; 1993–2001 | 390 | 21 | 411 | 8 |
| Tony Caldwell | England | FW | 1983–1987 | 166 | 9 | 177 | 78 |
| Mark Came | England | DF | 1984–1992 | 246 | 13 | 259 | 11 |
| Asa Hartford | England | MF | 1985–1987 | 101 | 0 | 101 | 10 |
| Julian Darby | England | MF | 1986–1993 | 333 | 12 | 345 | 52 |
| Mark Winstanley | England | CB | 1986–1994 | 279 | 6 | 285 | 6 |
| David Felgate | Wales | GK | 1987–1993 | 300 | 0 | 300 | 0 |
| Stuart Storer | England | DF | 1987–1993 | 127 | 38 | 165 | 15 |
| Phil Brown | England | RB | 1988–1994 | 330 | 2 | 332 | 17 |
| Barry Cowdrill | England | DF | 1988–1992 | 157 | 3 | 160 | 6 |
| Tony Philliskirk | England | FW | 1989–1992 | 180 | 2 | 182 | 75 |
| Dave Reeves | England | MF | 1989–1993 | 142 | 31 | 173 | 42 |
| Alan Stubbs | England | CB | 1990–1996 | 232 | 24 | 256 | 15 |
| Scott Green | England | DF | 1990–1997 | 221 | 65 | 286 | 31 |
| Mark Seagraves | England | DF | 1990–1995 | 190 | 5 | 195 | 9 |
| Jason McAteer | Republic of Ireland | MF | 1992–1995 | 139 | 6 | 145 | 15 |
| John McGinlay | Scotland | FW | 1992–1997 | 230 | 15 | 245 | 118 |
| Keith Branagan | Republic of Ireland | GK | 1992–2000 | 263 | 0 | 263 | 0 |
| David Lee | England | MF | 1992–1997 | 164 | 35 | 199 | 20 |
| Alan Thompson | England | MF | 1993–1998 | 180 | 18 | 198 | 42 |
| Guðni Bergsson | Iceland | CB | 1995–2003 | 306 | 11 | 317 | 26 |
| Nathan Blake | Wales | FW | 1995–1998 | 118 | 6 | 124 | 48 |
| Scott Sellars | England | LW | 1995–1999 | 119 | 7 | 126 | 16 |
| Andy Todd | England | CB | 1995–2000 | 84 | 23 | 107 | 2 |
| Per Frandsen | Denmark | MF | 1996–1999; 2000–2004 | 277 | 27 | 304 | 36 |
| Michael Johansen | Denmark | MF | 1996–2000 | 140 | 30 | 170 | 21 |
| Jussi Jääskeläinen | Finland | GK | 1997–2012 | 529 | 1 | 530 | 0 |
| Ricardo Gardner | Jamaica | U | 1998–2012 | 341 | 69 | 410 | 25 |
| Mark Fish | South Africa | CB | 1997–2000 | 125 | 2 | 127 | 4 |
| Robbie Elliott | England | RB | 1997–2001 | 85 | 18 | 103 | 7 |
| Dean Holdsworth | England | FW | 1997–2003 | 118 | 68 | 176 | 49 |
| Mike Whitlow | England | CB | 1997–2003 | 149 | 14 | 163 | 2 |
| Paul Warhurst | England | U | 1998–2003 | 89 | 17 | 106 | 0 |
| Claus Jensen | Denmark | MF | 1998–2000 | 108 | 1 | 109 | 10 |
| Kevin Nolan | England | MF | 1999–2009 | 291 | 54 | 345 | 50 |
| Bo Hansen | Denmark | MF | 1999–2002 | 78 | 41 | 119 | 17 |
| Michael Ricketts | England | FW | 2000–2003 | 68 | 44 | 112 | 46 |
| Nicky Hunt | England | RB | 2000–2010 | 143 | 18 | 161 | 1 |
| Simon Charlton | England | LB | 2000–2004 | 120 | 14 | 134 | 0 |
| Anthony Barness | England | RB | 2000–2005 | 92 | 24 | 116 | 0 |
| Bruno Ngotty | France | CB | 2001–2006 | 164 | 8 | 172 | 7 |
| Henrik Pedersen | Denmark | U | 2001–2007 | 109 | 62 | 171 | 29 |
| Jay-Jay Okocha | Nigeria | MF | 2002–2006 | 123 | 22 | 145 | 18 |
| Iván Campo | Spain | U | 2002–2008 | 166 | 28 | 194 | 14 |
| Kevin Davies | England | FW | 2003–2013 | 373 | 34 | 407 | 85 |
| Stelios Giannakopoulos | Greece | RW | 2003–2008 | 118 | 59 | 177 | 28 |
| El Hadji Diouf | Senegal | U | 2003–2008 | 114 | 22 | 136 | 24 |
| Gary Speed | Wales | MF | 2004–2008 | 130 | 9 | 139 | 14 |
| Tal Ben Haim | Israel | DF | 2004–2007 | 103 | 7 | 110 | 1 |
| Matthew Taylor | England | MF | 2008–2011 | 114 | 23 | 137 | 23 |
| Gary Cahill | England | DF | 2008–2012 | 147 | 0 | 147 | 15 |
| Fabrice Muamba | England | MF | 2008–2012 | 136 | 11 | 147 | 4 |
| Grétar Steinsson | Iceland | DF | 2008–2012 | 133 | 6 | 139 | 6 |
| Johan Elmander | Sweden | FW | 2008–2011 | 89 | 19 | 108 | 22 |
| Zat Knight | England | DF | 2009–2014 | 180 | 11 | 191 | 4 |
| Mark Davies | England | MF | 2008–2017 | 153 | 55 | 208 | 16 |
| Lee Chung-Yong | South Korea | MF | 2009–2015 | 149 | 46 | 195 | 20 |
| Sam Ricketts | Wales | DF | 2009–2013 | 107 | 7 | 114 | 1 |
| Chris Eagles | England | MF | 2011–2014 | 89 | 17 | 106 | 19 |
| Ádám Bogdán | Hungary | GK | 2010–2015 | 119 | 1 | 120 | 0 |
| Darren Pratley | England | MF | 2011–2018 | 174 | 29 | 203 | 17 |
| Tim Ream | United States | DF | 2012–2015 | 121 | 5 | 126 | 0 |
| Jay Spearing | England | MF | 2012–2017 | 156 | 17 | 173 | 10 |
| Neil Danns | Guyana | MF | 2013–2016 | 91 | 25 | 116 | 11 |
| David Wheater | England | DF | 2011–2019 | 218 | 18 | 236 | 16 |
| Josh Vela | England | MF | 2012–2019 | 161 | 21 | 182 | 13 |
| Gary Madine | England | FW | 2015–2018 | 93 | 14 | 107 | 25 |
| Mark Beevers | England | DF | 2016–2019 | 131 | 1 | 132 | 12 |
| Alex Baptiste | England | DF | 2013–2015; 2020–2022 | 92 | 11 | 103 | 5 |
| Ricardo Santos | Cape Verde | DF | 2020–2025 | 205 | 2 | 207 | 6 |
| Dapo Afolayan | England | U | 2021–2023 | 81 | 20 | 101 | 21 |
| Gethin Jones | Australia | DF | 2020–2025 | 172 | 16 | 188 | 8 |
| MJ Williams | Wales | U | 2021–2023 | 88 | 12 | 100 | 1 |
| Dion Charles | Northern Ireland | FW | 2022–2025 | 125 | 24 | 149 | 57 |
| George Thomason | England | MF | 2020–2025 | 140 | 29 | 169 | 13 |
| Aaron Morley | England | MF | 2022–2026 | 115 | 54 | 169 | 17 |
| Kyle Dempsey | England | MF | 2022–2026 | 97 | 63 | 160 | 17 |
| Josh Sheehan | Wales | MF | 2021– | 169 | 39 | 208 | 19 |
| George Johnston | Scotland | DF | 2021–2026 | 179 | 12 | 191 | 4 |
| Eoin Toal | Northern Ireland | DF | 2022– | 148 | 7 | 155 | 13 |
| Josh Dacres-Cogley | England | DF | 2023–2026 | 112 | 13 | 125 | 4 |
