= List of Bolton Wanderers F.C. seasons =

Bolton Wanderers league performances

This is a list of league seasons played by Bolton Wanderers Football Club in English and European football, from 1888 to the current season. The club was founded in 1874 by the Reverend John Farrall Wright.

The club has won the FA Cup four times and the Charity Shield once. They have competed in the UEFA Cup on two occasions.

The club's highest league position is third in the First Division, achieved three times, in 1891–92, 1920–21 and 1924–25. Their lowest league position is third in the fourth tier (Fourth Division and League Two), twice in 1987–88 and 2020–21, the only seasons they competed in the lowest professional tier.

== Key ==
Key to league record:

- P = Played
- W = Games won
- D = Games drawn
- L = Games lost
- F = Goals for
- A = Goals against
- Pts = Points
- Pos = Final position

Key to divisions:

- Prem = Premier League
- FL = The Football League
- Div 1 = Football League First Division
- Div 2 = Football League Second Division
- Div 3 = Football League Third Division
- Div 4 = Football League Fourth Division
- n/a = Not applicable

Key to rounds:

- DNE = Did not enter
- PR = Preliminary round
- R1 = Round 1
- R2 = Round 2
- R3 = Round 3
- R4 = Round 4
- R5 = Round 5
- Grp = Group stage
- QF = Quarter-finals
- NQF = Northern Quarter-finals
- SF = Semi-finals
- NF = Northern final
- RU = Runners-up
- W = Winners

Champions	Runners-up	Play-offs	Promoted	Relegated

Division shown in bold to indicate a change in division.
Top scorers shown in bold are players who were also top scorers in their division that season.

== Seasons ==
Season	League									FA Cup	League Cup	Europe / Other		Top goalscorer(s) (Note: Goals in all competitions (The Football League or Premier League, FA Cup, League Cup, European and other Football Association (FA) and Football League domestic cup competitions) are counted.)	
Season	Division	Pld	W	D	L	GF	GA	Pts	Pos	FA Cup	League Cup	Europe / Other		Player	Goals
1881–82										R2				William Struthers	2
1882–83										R3				William Struthers	7
1883–84										R4				R. Steel	6
1884–85										DNE				Unknown	
1885–86										R3				L. Fallon	2
1886–87										R3				Kenny Davenport; Hewitson; William Struthers	3
1887–88										R2				James Brogan; Bob Roberts	2
1888–89	FL	22	10	2	10	63	59	22	5th	DNE				James Brogan	13
1889–90	FL	22	9	1	12	54	65	19	9th	SF				Davie Weir	21
1890–91	FL	22	12	1	9	47	34	25	5th	R1				John McNee; James Cassidy	9
1891–92	FL	26	17	2	7	51	37	36	3rd	R1				James Cassidy	18
1892–93	Div 1	30	13	6	11	57	55	32	5th	R1				James Cassidy; Joe Dickenson	9
1893–94	Div 1	30	10	4	16	38	52	24	13th	R/U				James Cassidy	15
1894–95	Div 1	30	9	7	14	61	62	25	10th	R3				Charlie Henderson	14
1895–96	Div 1	30	16	5	9	49	37	37	4th	SF				Bill Joyce	12
1896–97	Div 1	30	12	6	12	40	43	30	8th	R2				Bob Jack	11
1897–98	Div 1	30	11	4	15	28	41	26	11th	R3				James Cassidy	8
1898–99	Div 1	34	9	7	18	37	51	25	17th	R1				Sandy Gilligan; Hugh Morgan	6
1899–1900	Div 2	34	22	8	4	79	25	52	2nd	R1				Laurie Bell	23
1900–01	Div 1	34	13	7	14	39	55	33	10th	R2				Laurie Bell	9
1901–02	Div 1	34	12	8	14	51	56	32	12th	R2				Tom Barlow	10
1902–03	Div 1	34	8	3	23	37	73	19	18th	R1				Sam Marsh	9
1903–04	Div 2	34	12	10	12	59	41	34	7th	R/U				Sam Marsh	21
1904–05	Div 2	34	27	2	5	87	32	56	2nd	R3				Sam Marsh	27
1905–06	Div 1	38	17	7	14	81	67	41	6th	R1				Albert Shepherd	26
1906–07	Div 1	38	18	8	12	59	47	44	6th	R3				Albert Shepherd	19
1907–08	Div 1	38	14	5	19	52	58	33	19th	R3				Albert Shepherd	25
1908–09	Div 2	38	24	4	10	59	28	52	**1st**	R1				Billy Hughes	16
1909–10	Div 1	38	9	6	23	44	71	24	20th	R1				Billy Hughes	12
1910–11	Div 2	38	21	9	8	69	40	51	**2nd**	R1				Billy Hughes	21
1911–12	Div 1	38	20	3	15	54	43	43	4th	R3				Joe Smith	24
1912–13	Div 1	38	16	10	12	62	63	42	8th	R1				Joe Smith	22
1913–14	Div 1	38	16	10	12	65	52	42	6th	R3				George Lillycrop	25
1914–15	Div 1	38	11	8	19	68	84	30	17th	SF				Joe Smith	36
No competitive football was played between 1915 and 1919 due to the World War I
1919–20	Div 1	42	19	9	14	72	65	47	6th	R1				Frank Roberts	26
1920–21	Div 1	42	19	14	9	77	53	52	3rd	R1				Joe Smith	38
1921–22	Div 1	42	20	7	15	68	59	47	6th	R2				David Jack	24
1922–23	Div 1	42	14	12	16	50	58	40	13th	**W**				Joe Smith	19
1923–24	Div 1	42	18	14	10	68	34	50	4th	R2				David Jack	27
1924–25	Div 1	42	22	11	9	76	34	55	3rd	R2				David Jack	27
1925–26	Div 1	42	17	10	15	78	76	44	8th	**W**				Joe Smith	21
1926–27	Div 1	42	19	10	13	84	62	48	4th	R5				David Jack; John Smith	17
1927–28	Div 1	42	16	11	15	81	66	43	7th	R4				David Jack	24
1928–29	Div 1	42	14	12	16	73	80	40	14th	**W**				Harold Blackmore	37
1929–30	Div 1	42	15	9	18	74	74	39	15th	R3				Harold Blackmore	30
1930–31	Div 1	42	15	9	18	68	81	39	14th	R4				Harold Blackmore	30
1931–32	Div 1	42	17	4	21	72	80	38	17th	R3				Jack Milsom	19
1932–33	Div 1	42	12	9	21	78	92	33	21st	R5				Jack Milsom	27
1933–34	Div 2	42	21	9	12	79	55	51	3rd	QF				Jack Milsom	27
1934–35	Div 2	42	26	4	12	96	48	56	2nd	SF				Jack Milsom	35
1935–36	Div 1	42	14	13	15	67	78	41	13th	R3				Jack Milsom	20
1936–37	Div 1	42	10	14	18	43	66	34	20th	R5				Jack Milsom	14
1937–38	Div 1	42	15	15	12	64	60	45	7th	R3				Ray Westwood	23
1938–39	Div 1	42	15	15	12	67	58	45	8th	R3				George Hunt	23
1939–40 (Note: The 1939–40 season was abandoned in early September and all results annulled)	Div 1	3	2	0	1	6	5	4	5th					N/A	N/A
No competitive football was played between 1939 and 1946 due to the World War II
1945–46	N/A									SF				Ray Westwood	8
1946–47	Div 1	42	13	8	21	57	69	34	18th	R4				Nat Lofthouse	21
1947–48	Div 1	42	16	5	21	46	58	37	17th	R3				Nat Lofthouse	18
1948–49	Div 1	42	14	10	18	59	68	38	14th	R3				Willie Moir	25
1949–50	Div 1	42	10	14	18	45	59	34	16th	R4				Nat Lofthouse	13
1950–51	Div 1	42	19	7	16	64	61	45	8th	R4				Nat Lofthouse	22
1951–52	Div 1	42	19	10	13	65	61	48	5th	R3				Nat Lofthouse	18
1952–53	Div 1	42	15	9	18	61	69	39	14th	R/U				Nat Lofthouse	30
1953–54	Div 1	42	18	12	12	75	60	48	5th	QF				Willie Moir	25
1954–55	Div 1	42	13	13	16	62	69	39	18th	R4				Nat Lofthouse	15
1955–56	Div 1	42	18	7	17	71	58	43	8th	R4				Nat Lofthouse	33
1956–57	Div 1	42	16	12	14	65	65	44	9th	R3				Nat Lofthouse	28
1957–58	Div 1	42	14	10	18	65	87	38	15th	**W**				Nat Lofthouse	20
1958–59	Div 1	42	20	10	12	79	66	50	4th	QF		FA Charity Shield	**W**	Nat Lofthouse	35
1959–60	Div 1	42	20	8	14	59	51	48	6th	R4				Dennis Stevens; Ray Parry	15
1960–61	Div 1	42	12	11	19	58	73	35	18th	R4	R4			Billy McAdams	21
1961–62	Div 1	42	16	10	16	62	66	42	11th	R3	R1			Fred Hill	14
1962–63	Div 1	42	15	5	17	55	75	35	18th	R3	R2			Francis Lee	13
1963–64	Div 1	42	10	8	24	48	80	28	21st	R4	R3			Francis Lee	16
1964–65	Div 2	42	20	10	12	80	58	50	3rd	R5	R2			Wyn Davies	25
1965–66	Div 2	42	16	9	17	62	59	41	9th	R4	R3			Francis Lee	18
1966–67	Div 2	42	14	14	14	64	58	42	9th	R4	R2			Francis Lee	24
1967–68	Div 2	42	13	13	16	60	63	39	12th	R3	R3			Gordon Taylor	12
1968–69	Div 2	42	12	14	16	55	52	38	17th	R4	R2			Roy Greaves	12
1969–70	Div 2	42	12	12	18	54	61	36	16th	R3	R2			John Byrom	25
1970–71	Div 2	42	7	10	25	35	74	24	22nd	R3	R3			Roger Hunt	8
1971–72	Div 3	46	17	16	13	51	41	50	7th	R4	R4			John Byrom; Roy Greaves	13
1972–73	Div 3	46	25	11	10	73	39	61	**1st**	R5	R2			John Byrom	22
1973–74	Div 2	42	15	12	15	44	40	42	11th	R4	R3			John Byrom	24
1974–75	Div 2	42	15	12	15	45	41	42	10th	R3	R2			Hugh Curran	11
1975–76	Div 2	42	20	12	10	64	38	52	4th	R5	R2			Garry Jones; Neil Whatmore	13
1976–77	Div 2	42	20	11	11	75	54	51	4th	R3	SF	Anglo-Scottish Cup	QF	Neil Whatmore	31
1977–78	Div 2	42	24	10	8	63	33	58	**1st**	R3	R3	Anglo-Scottish Cup	GRP	Neil Whatmore	21
1978–79	Div 1	42	12	11	19	54	75	35	17th	R3	R3	Anglo-Scottish Cup	GRP	Frank Worthington	26
1979–80	Div 1	42	5	15	22	38	73	25	22nd	R5	R2	Anglo-Scottish Cup	QF	Neil Whatmore	31
1980–81	Div 2	42	14	10	18	61	66	38	18th	R3	R2			Neil Whatmore	21
1981–82	Div 2	42	13	7	22	39	61	46	19th	R4	R1			Chris Thompson	14
1982–83	Div 2	42	11	11	20	42	61	44	22nd	R3	R2			Tony Henry	11
1983–84	Div 3	46	18	10	18	56	60	64	10th	R3	R1	Football League Trophy	NR1	Tony Caldwell	23
1984–85	Div 3	46	16	6	24	69	75	54	17th	R1	R3	Football League Trophy	NSF	Tony Caldwell	22
1985–86	Div 3	46	15	8	23	54	68	53	18th	R1	R2	Football League Trophy	R/U	Tony Caldwell	16
1986–87	Div 3	46	10	15	21	46	58	45	21st	R3	R1	Football League Trophy	NQF	Tony Caldwell	17
1987–88	Div 4	46	22	12	12	66	42	78	3rd	R3	R1	Football League Trophy	NR1	John Thomas	28
1988–89	Div 3	46	16	16	14	58	54	64	10th	R2	R1	Football League Trophy	**W**	Trevor Morgan; Steve Thompson	11
1989–90	Div 3	46	18	15	13	59	48	69	6th	R1	R3	Football League Trophy	NSF	Tony Philliskirk	25
1990–91	Div 3	46	24	11	11	64	50	83	4th (Note: Lost the play-off final to Tranmere Rovers 1–0 at Wembley Stadium, London)	R4	R2	Football League Trophy	NGS	Tony Philliskirk	28
1991–92	Div 3	46	14	17	15	57	56	59	13th	R5	R2	Football League Trophy	NR1	Tony Philliskirk	19
1992–93	Div 2 (Note: The Four Divisions in The Football League changed names. The First Division was called the Premier League. Second Division was called Football League Division 1. Third Division was called Football League Division 2. Fourth Division was called Football League Division 3)	46	27	9	10	80	41	90	2nd	R5	R2	Football League Trophy	NQF	Andy Walker	33
1993–94	Div 1	46	15	14	17	63	64	59	14th	QF	R2	Anglo-Italian Cup	GRP	John McGinlay	33
1994–95	Div 1	46	21	14	11	67	45	77	3rd (Note: Won the play-off final by beating Reading 4–3 at Wembley Stadium, London)	R3	R/U			John McGinlay	22
1995–96	Prem	38	8	5	25	39	71	29	20th	R4	R4			John McGinlay	9
1996–97	Div 1	46	28	14	4	100	53	98	**1st**	R4	QF			John McGinlay	30
1997–98	Prem	38	9	13	16	41	61	40	18th	R3	R4			Nathan Blake	14
1998–99	Div 1	46	20	16	10	78	59	76	6th (Note: Lost the play-off final to Watford 2–0 at Wembley Stadium, London)	R3	R4			Bob Taylor	18
1999–2000	Div 1	46	21	13	12	69	50	76	6th	SF	SF			Eiður Guðjohnsen	22
2000–01	Div 1	46	24	15	7	76	45	87	3rd (Note: Won the play-off final by beating Preston North End 3–0 at Millennium Stadium, Cardiff)	R5	R1			Michael Ricketts	24
2001–02	Prem	38	9	13	16	44	62	40	16th	R4	QF			Michael Ricketts	15
2002–03	Prem	38	10	14	14	41	51	44	17th	R3	R2			Youri Djorkaeff; Jay-Jay Okocha; Henrik Pedersen; Michael Ricketts	7
2003–04	Prem	38	14	11	13	48	56	53	8th	R3	R/U			Kevin Nolan	12
2004–05	Prem	38	16	10	12	49	44	58	6th	QF	R3			Kevin Davies; El Hadji Diouf	9
2005–06	Prem	38	15	11	12	49	41	56	8th	R5	QF	UEFA Cup	R32	Stelios Giannakopoulos	12
2006–07	Prem	38	16	8	14	47	52	56	7th	R4	R3			Nicolas Anelka	12
2007–08	Prem	38	9	10	19	36	54	37	16th	R3	R4	UEFA Cup	R16	Nicolas Anelka	11
2008–09	Prem	38	11	8	19	41	53	41	13th	R3	R2			Kevin Davies	12
2009–10	Prem	38	10	9	19	40	66	39	14th	R5	R4			Kevin Davies	9
2010–11	Prem	38	12	10	16	52	56	46	14th	SF	R3			Johan Elmander	12
2011–12	Prem	38	10	6	22	46	77	36	18th	QF	R4			Ivan Klasnić	9
2012–13	Champ	46	18	14	14	69	61	68	7th	R4	R2			Chris Eagles	12
2013–14	Champ	46	14	17	15	59	60	59	14th	R4	R2			Jermaine Beckford	9
2014–15	Champ	46	13	12	21	54	67	51	18th	R4	R3			Adam Le Fondre	8
2015–16	Champ	46	5	15	26	41	81	30	24th	R4	R1			Zach Clough	7
2016–17	EFL One	46	25	11	10	68	36	86	2nd	R3	R1	EFL Trophy	GRP	Josh Vela; Gary Madine	10
2017–18	Champ	46	10	13	23	39	74	43	21st	R3	R3			Gary Madine	10
2018–19	Champ	46	8	8	30	29	78	32	23rd	R4	R1			Josh Magennis	7
2019–20 (Note: The 2019–20 season was postponed in March and abandoned in July with all results up to that point standing and final placings based on a Points-Per-Game formula)	EFL One	34	5	11	18	27	66	14 (Note: Bolton Wanderers deducted 12 points for entering administration. "EFL statement: Bolton Wanderers". BBC Sport. 13 May 2019.)	23rd	R1	R1	EFL Trophy	R2	Daryl Murphy	8
2020–21	EFL Two	46	23	10	13	59	50	79	3rd	R1	R1	EFL Trophy	GRP	Eoin Doyle	19
2021–22	EFL One	46	21	10	15	74	57	73	9th	R1	R2	EFL Trophy	R3	Oladapo Afolayan	14
2022–23	EFL One	46	23	12	11	62	36	81	5th	R1	R2	EFL Trophy	**W**	Dion Charles	21
2023–24	EFL One	46	25	12	9	86	51	87	3rd (Note: Lost the play-off final to Oxford United 2–0 at Wembley Stadium, London)	R3	R2	EFL Trophy	NQF	Dion Charles	20
2024–25	EFL One	46	20	8	18	67	70	68	8th	R1	R3	EFL Trophy	NQF	Aaron Collins	19
2025–26	EFL One	46	19	18	9	70	52	75	5th (Note: Promoted to the EFL Championship via the play-offs, after beating Stockport County 4-1 in the 2026 EFL League One play-off final.)	R2	R1	EFL Trophy	R3	Sam Dalby	14
2026–27	Champ										R1				

- Seasons spent at Level 1 of the football league system: 73
- Seasons spent at Level 2 of the football league system: 35
- Seasons spent at Level 3 of the football league system: 18
- Seasons spent at Level 4 of the football league system: 2
