= List of Bolton Wanderers F.C. records and statistics =

Bolton Wanderers F.C. are an English professional association football club based in Horwich, Bolton. The club was founded as Christ Church F.C. in 1874, making them one of the oldest football clubs in England, and turned professional in 1877, before joining the Football League as founder members in 1888. Bolton Wanderers currently play in English Football League, the third tier of English football. They were relegated from the top tier (where they had been since 2001) in 2012 but in their time as a professional club have played in all four professional English leagues.

This list encompasses the major honours won by Bolton Wanderers and records set by the club, their managers and their players. The player records section includes details of the club's leading goalscorers and those who have made most appearances in first-team competitions. It also records notable achievements by Bolton Wanderers players on the international stage, and the highest transfer fees paid and received by the club. The club's attendance records, both at The Reebok Stadium, their home since 1997, and Burnden Park, their home between 1895 and 1997, are also included in the list.

The club have won the FA Cup four times, but not since 1958, and have spent the majority of their history in the top flight of English football. Bolton also hold the record for the most years in the top flight of English football without winning the title; 73 years in total. The club's record appearance maker is Eddie Hopkinson, who made 578 appearances between his debut in 1952 and retirement in 1970, and the club's record goalscorer is Nat Lofthouse, who scored 285 goals in 503 games between 1946 and 1960.

All stats accurate as of end of 2018–19 season.

== Honours and achievements ==
League

- Second Division / Championship (level 2)
  - Champions: 1908–09, 1977–78, 1996–97
  - 2nd place promotion: 1899–1900, 1904–05, 1910–11, 1934–35
  - Play-off winners: 1995, 2001
- Third Division / League One (level 3)
  - Champions: 1972–73
  - 2nd place promotion: 1992–93, 2016–17
- Fourth Division / League Two (level 4)
  - 3rd place promotion: 1987–88, 2020–21

Cup

- FA Cup
  - Winners: 1922–23, 1925–26, 1928–29, 1957–58
  - Runners-up: 1893–94, 1903–04, 1952–53
- Football League Cup
  - Runners-up: 1994–95, 2003–04
- FA Charity Shield
  - Winners: 1958
- Football League Trophy
  - Winners: 1988–89, 2022–23
  - Runners-up: 1985–86
- Football League War Cup
  - Winners: 1945

Reserves, youth, and others

- Premier League Asia Trophy (1) – 2005
- Peace Cup Runners up (1) – 2007
- Carlsberg Cup (1) – 2010
- Lancashire Senior Cup (13) – 1886, 1891, 1912, 1922, 1925, 1927, 1932, 1934, 1939 (shared with Preston North End), 1948, 1989, 1991, 2025
- Central League (2) – 1955, 1995
- Premier Reserve League North (1) – 2006–07
- Manchester Senior Cup (3) 1922, 1963, 2015
- Professional Development League North (1) – 2017–18
- Professional Development League National (1) – 2017–18
- EFL Youth Alliance North (1): 2024–25
- EFL Youth Alliance National (1): 2024–25
- LFA Youth Cup (1): 2024–25

== Players ==
All current players are in bold

=== Appearances ===
- Youngest first-team player: Ray Parry 15 years 267 days (v. Wolves, 13 October 1951).
- Oldest first-team player: Peter Shilton 45 years 239 days (v. Wolves, 15 May 1995).
- Most consecutive League appearances: **161** – Jim McDonagh, 2 October 1976 – 3 May 1980

==== Most appearances ====
Competitive matches only.

#	Name	Career	Appearances
1	(England) Eddie Hopkinson	1952–1970	578
2	(England) Roy Greaves	1965–1980	575
3	(England) Alex Finney	1922–1937	530
3	(Finland) Jussi Jääskeläinen	1997–2012	530
5	(England) Warwick Rimmer	1960–1975	528
6	(England) Bryan Edwards	1947–1965	518
7	(Wales) Ted Vizard	1910–1931	512
8	(England) Paul Jones	1970–1983	506
9	(England) Nat Lofthouse	1946–1960	503
10	(England) Roy Hartle	1952–1966	499

=== Goalscorers ===
- Most league goals in a season: Joe Smith, 38 goals in 1920–21 season.
- Most goals scored in a match: **5**
  - Billy Struthers v Bootle, 4 November 1882
  - James Cassidy v Sheffield United 1 February 1890
  - Tony Caldwell v Walsall 10 September 1983

==== Top goalscorers ====
Competitive matches only.

#	Name	Years	Total
1	(England) Nat Lofthouse	1946–1960	285
2	(England) Joe Smith	1908–1927	277
3	(England) David Jack	1920–1928	161
4	(England) Jack Milsom	1929–1937	153
5	(England) Ray Westwood	1928–1947	144
6	(Scotland) Willie Moir	1945–1955	134
7	(England) John Byrom	1966–1976	130
8	(England) Harold Blackmore	1927–1932	122
9	(England) Neil Whatmore	1973–1981 1982–1983 1983–1984 1987–1988	121
10	(Scotland) John McGinlay	1992–1997	118

=== International ===
- Most capped player: Ricardo Gardner, 72 caps for Jamaica as a Bolton Wanderers player. 37 of his (then) 109 caps coming in 1997 and 1998 prior to signing with Bolton. He made three more after leaving in 2012.
- First player to play in a World Cup: Nat Lofthouse for England against Belgium on 17 June 1954.
- Most World Cup goals: Nat Lofthouse, 3 (1958).

=== World Cup participants ===
This section lists all players who have played in a World Cup Finals game whilst playing for Bolton Wanderers F.C.

Name	Nationality	World Cup
Nat Lofthouse	England	1954
Eddie Hopkinson	England	1958
Tommy Banks	England	1958
Jason McAteer	Ireland	1994
Per Frandsen	Denmark	1998
Mark Fish	South Africa	1998
Stig Tøfting	Denmark	2002
Youri Djorkaeff	France	2002
Jared Borgetti	Mexico	2006
Radhi Jaïdi	Tunisia	2006
Hidetoshi Nakata	Japan	2006
Lee Chung-Yong	South Korea	2010; 2014
Danny Shittu	Nigeria	2010
Vladimír Weiss	Slovakia	2010
Stuart Holden	United States	2010

=== European Championship participants ===
This section lists all players who have played in a European Championship Finals game whilst playing for Bolton Wanderers F.C.

Name	Nationality	Euros
Stelios Giannakopoulos	Greece	2004; 2008

=== Record transfer fees ===
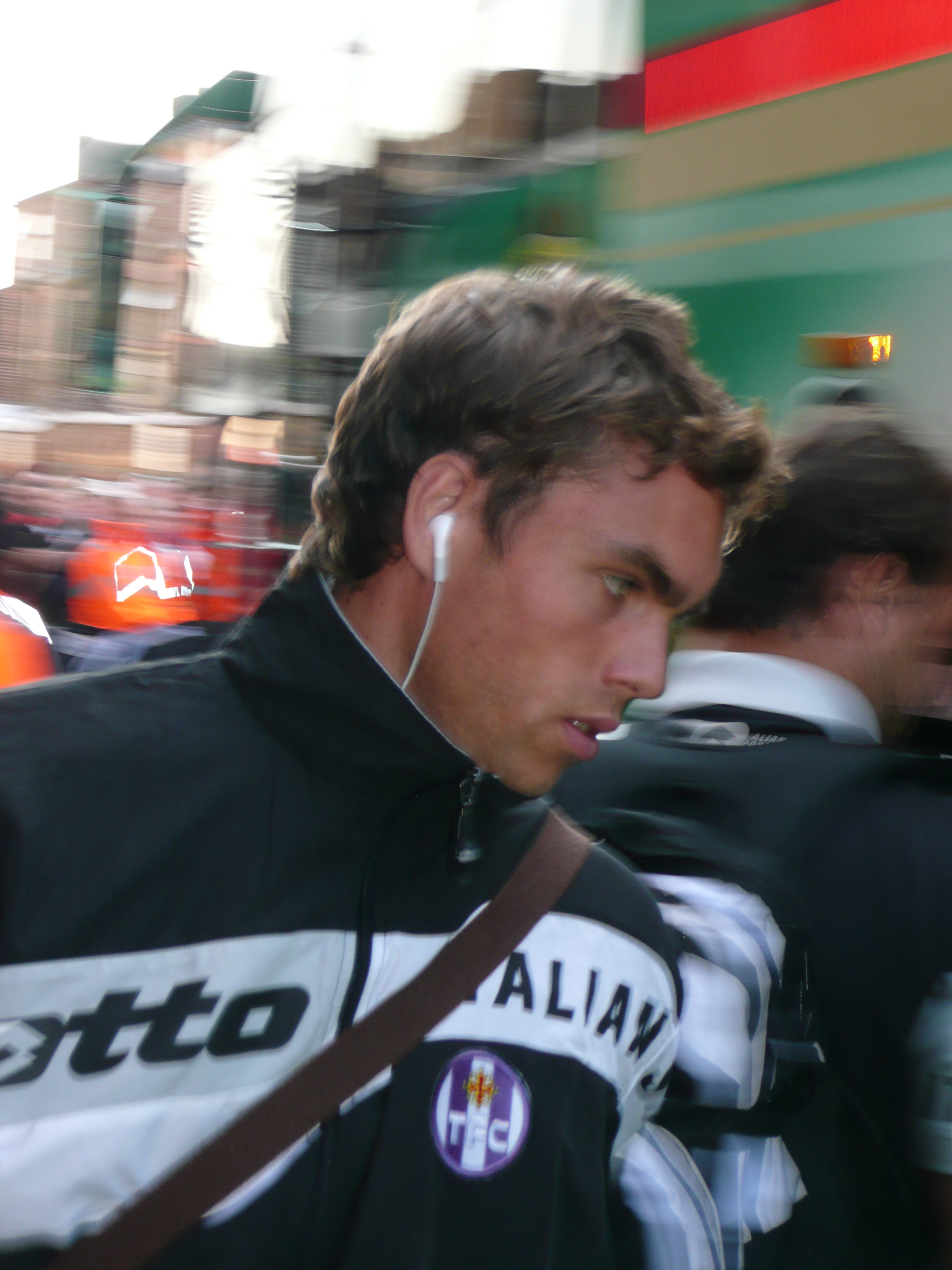
Bolton's record signing Johan Elmander.

==== Paid ====
Bolton Wanderers's record signing is Johan Elmander, who signed for the club from Toulouse for £8.2 million in June 2008. The transfer also included Daniel Braaten, with that reportedly making the transfer worth 11m. This beat the previous record of £8.0 million, which the club paid Fenerbahce for Nicolas Anelka in 2006.

#	Name	Fee	From	Date	Notes
1	(Sweden) Johan Elmander	£8.2m (+player) (Note: The transfer also included Daniel Braaten, with it reported to have made the overall transfer equal to 11m.)	(France) Toulouse	June 2008	
2	(France) Nicolas Anelka	£8.0m	(Turkey) Fenerbahçe	August 2006	
3=	(England) Gary Cahill	£5.0m	(England) Aston Villa	January 2008	
3=	(England) Fabrice Muamba	£5.0m	(England) Birmingham City	June 2008	
5=	(Senegal) El Hadji Diouf	£4.0m	(England) Liverpool	June 2005	
5=	(France) David Ngog	£4.0m	(England) Liverpool	August 2011	
7=	(Iceland) Grétar Steinsson	£3.5m	(Netherlands) AZ Alkmaar	January 2008	
7=	(England) Dean Holdsworth	£3.5m	(England) Wimbledon	October 1997	
7=	(England) Matthew Taylor	£3.5m	(England) Portsmouth	January 2008	

==== Progression of record fee paid ====
The club's first £1,000 transfer came in 1911, when they signed Alf Bentley from Derby County. They made their first £100,000 signing in 1978 with the transfer of Alan Gowling from Newcastle United for £120,000 and their first £1,000,000 transfer when they signed Gerry Taggart from Barnsley in 1995.

Date	Player	Bought from	Fee
1911	(England) Alf Bentley	Derby County	£1,000
1920	(England) David Jack	Plymouth Argyle	£3,500
1921	(England) Dick Pym	Exeter City	£5,000
1928	(England) Jack McClelland	Middlesbrough	£6,800
1948	(England) Jim Hernon	Leicester City	£14,850
1951	(England) Harold Hassall	Huddersfield Town	£27,000
1967	(Wales) Gareth Williams	Cardiff City	£50,000
1967	(England) Terry Wharton	Wolverhampton Wanderers	£70,000
1977	(England) Frank Worthington	Leicester City	£90,000
1978	(England) Alan Gowling	Newcastle United	£120,000
1978	(Scotland) Neil McNab	Tottenham Hotspur	£250,000
1979	(England) Len Cantello	West Bromwich Albion	£350,000
1994	(Netherlands) Fabian de Freitas	FC Volendam	£400,000
1995	(England) Chris Fairclough	Leeds United	£500,000
1995	(Northern Ireland) Gerry Taggart	Barnsley	£1,500,000
1997	(England) Robbie Elliott	Newcastle United	£2,500,000
1997	(England) Dean Holdsworth	Wimbledon	£3,500,000
2005	(Senegal) El Hadji Diouf	Liverpool	£4,000,000
2006	(France) Nicolas Anelka	Fenerbahçe	£8,000,000
2008	(Sweden) Johan Elmander	Toulouse	£8,250,000 (+player) (Note: The transfer also included Daniel Braaten, with it reported to have made the overall transfer equal to 11m.)

==== Received ====
The largest fee that Bolton Wanderers have received for one of their players was the £15million that Chelsea paid for the services of Nicolas Anelka during the transfer window of January 2008. Four years later, Bolton received their second largest transfer fee, also from Chelsea, for defender Gary Cahill.

#	Name	Fee	From	Date	Notes
1	(France) Nicolas Anelka	£15.0m	Chelsea	January 2008	
2	(England) Gary Cahill	£7.0m	Chelsea	January 2012	
3	(England) Gary Madine	£6.0m	Cardiff City	January 2018	
4=	(Republic of Ireland) Jason McAteer	£4.5m	Liverpool	September 1995	
4=	(England) Alan Thompson	£4.5m	Aston Villa	June 1998	
6	(Wales) Nathan Blake	£4.25m	Blackburn Rovers	October 1998	
7=	(Serbia) Saša Ćurčić	£4.0m	Aston Villa	August 1996	
7=	(Denmark) Claus Jensen	£4.0m	Charlton Athletic	July 2000	
7=	(Iceland) Eiður Guðjohnsen	£4.0m	Chelsea	July 2000	
7=	(England) Kevin Nolan	£4.0m	Newcastle United	January 2009	
7=	(Oman) Ali Al-Habsi	£4.0m	Wigan Athletic	July 2011	

== Club records ==
=== League highs and lows ===
- Most points in a season: 98 in 46 matches, First Division, 1996–97.
- Most home wins in a season: 18, 1924–25, 1972–73, 1992–93, 1996–97.
- Most home draws in a season: 11, 1979–80.
- Most home losses in a season: 15, 2018–19.
- Most home goals scored in a season: 63, 1934–35.
- Most home goals conceded in a season: 39, 2011–12.
- Most away wins in a season: 14, 2000–01 (15 including playoff final).
- Most away draws in a season: 10, 1986–87, 1996–97, 1998–99.
- Most away losses in a season: 19, 2015–16.
- Most away goals scored in a season: 40, 1996–97 (41 2000–01 including playoffs).
- Most away goals conceded in a season: 59, 1932–33.
- Most wins in a season: 28, 1996–97.
- Most draws in a season: 17, 1991–92.
- Most losses in a season: 30, 2018–19.
- Most goals scored in a season: 100 in 46 matches, First Division, 1996–97, including 2 own goals.
- Most goals conceded in a season: 92, 1932–33.
- Fewest home wins in a season: 4, 2011–12, 2018–19, 2019–20 (If including Cup matches, then only 2018–19 and 2019–20 with 5 wins each, 2011–12 has 7)
- Fewest home draws in a season: 0, 1988–89, 1890–91, 1904–05.
- Fewest home losses in a season: 0, 1910–11, 1920–21.
- Fewest home goals scored in a season: 18, 1893–94, 1897–98, 1902–03, 2018–19
- Fewest home goals conceded in a season: 7, 1899–90.
- Fewest away wins in a season: 0, 1949–50, 1979–80, 2015–16.
- Fewest away draws in a season: 0, 1889–90, 1891–92.
- Fewest away losses in a season: 3, 1899–90, 1904–05, 1996–97.
- Fewest away goals scored in a season: 10, 1897–98.
- Fewest away goals conceded in a season: 16, 1904–05.
- Fewest wins in a season: 5, 1979–80.
- Fewest draws in a season: 1, 1889–90, 1890–91.
- Fewest losses in a season: 4, 1899–90, 1996–97.
- Fewest goals scored in a season: 27, 1897–98.
- Fewest goals conceded in a season: 25, 1899–90.
- Highest sum of best scores in different competitions: 20 in 2023–24 (8 in EFL trophy v Man Utd U21 (26 September), 7 in League 1 v Exeter City, 5 in FA Cup (25 November) v Harrogate T. (2 December)

=== Matches ===
==== Record wins ====
- Record League home win: 8–0 (v. Barnsley, 6 October 1934).
- Record League away win: 7–1 (v. Aston Villa, 26 December 1914).
- Record FA Cup home win: 13–0 (v. Sheffield United second round, 1 February 1890).
- Record FA Cup away win: 5–1 (v. Charlton Athletic third round, 14 January 1933).
- Record League Cup home win: 6–1 (v. Tottenham Hotspur fourth round, 27 November 1996).
- Record League Cup away win: 4–0 (v. Rochdale second round, 10 October 1973).
- Record Premier League home win: 5–0 (v. Stoke City, 6 November 2011.
- Record Premier League away win: 5–0 (v. Leicester City, 18 August 2001).
- Record competitive win: 14–0 (v. Wigan A.F.C., Lancashire Senior Cup first round, 9 October 1886).

==== Record defeats ====
- Record League home defeat:
  - 0–6 (v. Manchester United, 25 February 1996).
- Record League away defeat:
  - 0–7 (v. Burnley, Division One, 1 March 1890).
  - 0–7 (v. Sheffield Wednesday, Division One, 1 March 1915).
  - 0–7 (v. Manchester City, Division One, 21 March 1936).
- Record FA Cup home defeat:
  - 0–5 (v. Bristol City, Round One, 7 February 1903).
  - 0–5 (v. Manchester City, Round Five, 20 February 1937).
- Record FA Cup away defeat: 1–9 (v. Preston North End, Round Two, 10 December 1887).
- Record League Cup home defeat: 0–6 (v. Chelsea, Round Four replay, 8 November 1971).
- Record League Cup away defeat: 0–6 (v. Tottenham Hotspur, Round Five, 11 December 2001).
- Record Premier League home defeat: 0–6 (v. Manchester United, 25 February 1996).
- Record Premier League away defeat: 2–6 (v. Manchester City, 18 October 2003).
- Record loss at Wembley: 0–5 (v. Stoke City, 17 April 2011).

==== Record draws ====
- Highest scoring League draw:
  - 4–4 (v. Blackburn Rovers, Division One, 8 December 1888).
  - 4–4 (v. Stoke City, Division One, 15 October 1892).
  - 4–4 (v. Middlesbrough, Division One, 9 December 1905).
  - 4–4 (v. West Ham United, Division One, 26 March 1927).
  - 4–4 (v. Portsmouth, Division One, 23 February 1929).
  - 4–4 (v. West Bromwich Albion, Division One, 18 March 1980).
  - 4–4 (v. Bradford City, Division Three, 17 September 1991).
- Highest scoring FA Cup draw: 5–5 (v. Eagley, Round One, 22 October 1881).
- Highest scoring League Cup draw: 4–4 after extra time (v. Oldham Athletic, Round One, Second Leg, 4 September 1984).
- Highest scoring Premier League draw:
  - 3–3 (v. Derby County, 14 December 1997).
  - 3–3 (v. Manchester City, 12 December 2009).

=== Most consecutive ===
- Wins: 11. (v. Gainsborough Trinity, 10 November 1904) – (v. Barnsley, 20 January 1905).
- Home wins: 13. (v. Gainsborough Trinity, 12 November 1910) – (v. Chelsea, 26 April 1911).
- Away wins: 5. (v. Doncaster Rovers, 14 December 1904) – (v. Burnley, 22 January 1905) and (v. Fleetwood Town, 11 March 2017) – (v. Southend United, 4 April 2017)
- Draws: 6. (v. Manchester City, 25 January 1913) – (v. Derby County, 8 March 1913).
- Losses: 11. (v. Sheffield United, 7 April 1902) – (v. Wolverhampton Wanderers, 18 October 1902).
- Home Losses: 7. (v. Sunderland, 7 May 2011) – (v. Sunderland, 22 October 2011).
- Away Losses: 15. (v. Brentford, 14 April 1984) – (v. Bradford City, 29 December 1984).
- Games without scoring: 8. (v. Middlesbrough, 9 April 2019) – (v. Coventry City, 10 August 2019).
- Games with scoring: 24.
  - (v. Derby County, 8 September 1888) – (v. Everton, 21 September 1889)
  - (v. Sheffield United, 22 November 1996) – (v. Oxford United, 12 April 1997).
- Games without losing: 23. (v. Bury, 13 October 1990) – (v. Fulham, 9 March 1991).
- Home games without losing: 27. (v. Sheffield United, 24 April 1920) – (v. Huddersfield Town, 24 September 1921).
- Away games without losing: 11. (v. Doncaster Rovers, 10 December 1904) – (v. West Bromwich Albion, 22 April 1905).
- Games without a draw: 34. (v. Newcastle United, 26 February 2011) – (v. Wolverhampton Wanderers, 31 December 2011) including 2 FA Cup games and 3 League Cup games.
- Games without a win: 26. (v. Sheffield United, 7 April 1902) – (v. West Bromwich Albion, 10 January 1903).
- Home games without a win: 12. (v. Sheffield Wednesday, 12 March 2019 – Rochdale, 19 October 2019).
- Away games without a win: 28. (v. Everton, 16 April 1979) – (v. Oldham Athletic, 27 September 1980).
- Games without conceding: 7. (v. Woolwich Arsenal, 24 February 1900) – (v. Chesterfield, 14 April 1900) and (v. Charlton Athletic, 28 October 2023) – (v. Oxford United, 28 November 2023)
- Games with conceding: 27. (v. Sheffield United, 7 April 1902) – (v. Notts County, 17 January 1903).

=== Attendances ===
- Highest attendance at a home match (Burnden Park): 69,912 (v. Manchester City, FA Cup Fifth Round, 18 February 1933).
- Highest attendance at a home match (Reebok Stadium): 28,353 (v. Leicester City, Premier League, 28 December 2003).
- Lowest attendance at a home match (Burnden Park): 1,507 (v. Rochdale, Football League Trophy, 10 December 1991).
- Lowest attendance at a home match (Reebok Stadium): 1,540 (v. Everton U21, Football League Trophy First Round, Group Stage, Match One, 30 August 2019). (not counting behind closed doors games)
- Highest attendance at a FA Cup match (Wembley Stadium (1923)): 126,047 (official) (v. West Ham, FA Cup Final, 28 April 1923). Some estimates of attendance exceed 300,000.
- Highest attendance at a League Cup match (Wembley Stadium (1923)): 75,595 (v. Liverpool, League Cup Final, 2 April 1995).
- Highest attendance at an EFL Trophy match: 79,389 (v. Plymouth Argyle, 2023 EFL Trophy final, Wembley Stadium, 2 April 2023).

== Bolton Wanderers in Europe ==
Below is Bolton Wanderers' record in Europe. As of 2008 they have appeared in the UEFA Cup twice, losing only two games in the process.

Bolton Wanderers in Europe
Season	Competition	Round	Country	Club	Home	Away	Aggregate
2005–06	UEFA Cup	First round	(Bulgaria)	Lokomotiv Plovdiv	2–1	2–1	4–2
2005–06	UEFA Cup	Group H	(Spain)	Sevilla	1–1	—N/a	3rd
2005–06	UEFA Cup	Group H	(Russia)	Zenit Saint Petersburg	1–0	—N/a	3rd
2005–06	UEFA Cup	Group H	(Turkey)	Beşiktaş	—N/a	1–1	3rd
2005–06	UEFA Cup	Group H	(Portugal)	Vitória de Guimarães	—N/a	1–1	3rd
2005–06	UEFA Cup	Round of 32	(France)	Marseille	0–0	1–2	1–2
2007–08	UEFA Cup	First round	(North Macedonia)	Rabotnički	1–0	1–1	2–1
2007–08	UEFA Cup	Group F	(Germany)	Bayern Munich	—N/a	2–2	3rd
2007–08	UEFA Cup	Group F	(Portugal)	Braga	1–1	—N/a	3rd
2007–08	UEFA Cup	Group F	(Greece)	Aris	1–1	—N/a	3rd
2007–08	UEFA Cup	Group F	(Serbia)	Red Star Belgrade	—N/a	1–0	3rd
2007–08	UEFA Cup	Round of 32	(Spain)	Atlético Madrid	1–0	0–0	1–0
2007–08	UEFA Cup	Round of 16	(Portugal)	Sporting CP	1–1	0–1	1–2
