= Don Howe (footballer, born 1917) =

English footballer (1917-1978)

Personal information
- Full name: Donald Howe
- Date of birth: 26 November 1917
- Place of birth: Outwood, England
- Date of death: 23 August 1978 (aged 60)
- Place of death: Farnworth, England
- Positions: Wing half; inside left

Youth career
- –1934: Whitehall Printeries

Senior career*
Years	Team	Apps	(Gls)
1934–1952	Bolton Wanderers	286	(35)
- * Club domestic league appearances and goals

Donald Howe (26 November 1917 – 23 August 1978) was an English association (soccer) footballer who played in the 1930s, 1940s and 1950s for Bolton Wanderers (captain), he made his league début against Liverpool in October 1936, as a child he attended Stanley St. Peter's School in Stanley, West Riding of Yorkshire.

Over the next few years he played in every position for Bolton Wanderers except centre-forward. In the 1938–39 season Howe scored nine goals.

At the outset of World War II, of the 35 players on the staff of Bolton Wanderers, 32 joined the armed services, a total of 17 players, including; Ernie Forrest, Albert Geldard, Harry Goslin, Stan Hanson, Don Howe, Jack Hurst, Jimmy Ithell, Jackie Roberts, Tommy Sinclair, Ray Westwood, and Danny Winter, joined the 53rd (Bolton) Field Regiment, Royal Artillery.

Following the German invasion of France on 10 May 1940, the 53rd (Bolton) Field Regiment was sent to help the French but came under attack from the advancing Panzer divisions, and Don Howe was lucky to make it back to the French port of Dunkirk where he was rescued by a British ship.

The 53rd (Bolton) Field Regiment spent the rest of 1940 and the whole of 1941 at various army camps around Britain, they spent their time building coastal defence constructions, manning anti-aircraft batteries and patrolling potential enemy landing sites all along the East Anglia coastline, variously stationed at Beccles, Nacton, and Holt. This enabled them to play the occasional match for Bolton Wanderers in the North-East League. The team that year included; Jack Atkinson, Ernie Forrest, Stan Hanson, Don Howe, Harry Hubbick, George Hunt, Jack Hurst, Jimmy Ithell, Danny Winter, Albert Geldard, Jackie Roberts, Walter Sidebottom, Tommy Sinclair, and Ray Westwood.

After spending time in Baghdad, the 53rd (Bolton) Field Regiment moved to Kirkuk on 8 January 1943. They were eventually relocated to Kifri which was to become their main base for the next five months. While there Ernie Forrest, Harry Goslin, Stan Hanson, and Don Howe, played for the British Army against the Polish Army in Baghdad. Howe scored one of the goals in the 4–2 victory. At the end of November 1943, Howe was wounded and evacuated to a dressing station.

After World War II Howe returned to Bolton Wanderers and played the majority of his matches at wing half, he also replaced the deceased Harry Goslin as captain of Bolton Wanderers, and was ever-present in the 1950–51 season.

Don Howe retired from football at the end of the 1951–52 season, he briefly worked as a coach for Bolton Wanderers before finding employment at a Bolton paper merchants.

== Family ==
Don Howe's father Henry Howe's marriage to Emma Harrison was registered during April→June 1914 in Wakefield district, Henry Howe was an under manager at Newmarket Colliery. As a child, Don Howe lived at Bottomboat, near Stanley, and had a brother; Joseph V. Howe (birth registered during January→March 1915 in Wakefield district, Marriage (to Elsie Newton) registered during April→June 1941 in Lower Agbrigg district, Death registered during October→December 1962 in Wakefield district (aged 47)), and a sister; Jennie Howe (birth registered during October→December 1921 in Wakefield district, Marriage (to John M. Mackenzie) registered during July→September 1945 in Lower Agbrigg district). Donald Howe's marriage to Margaret (née Booth) was registered during October→December 1939 in Bolton district.
