= Tommy Sinclair =

Tommy Sinclair may refer to:

- Tommy Sinclair (footballer, born 1921) (1921–2015), English footballer
- Tommy Sinclair (footballer, born 1897) (1897–1967), English footballer
- Tommy Sinclair (Scottish footballer) (fl. 1938–1939)

== See also ==
- Thomas Sinclair (disambiguation)
