= 1883–84 Bolton Wanderers F.C. season =

Bolton Wanderers
1883–84 season
- Secretary: Tom Rawthorne
- FA Cup: Fourth round
- Top goalscorer: League: All: R. Steel
1883 colours	1884 colours

The 1881–82 season was the third season in which Bolton Wanderers competed in a senior competitive football competition. The club entered the FA Cup in November 1883, but were knocked out in the fourth round by Notts County.

== F.A. Cup ==
Date	Round	Opponents	H / A	Result F–A	Scorers
10 November 1883	Round 1	Bolton Olympic	H	9–0	Davenport, Struthers (3), R. Steel (2), Gleaves, Howarth, Scholes
1 December 1883	Round 2	Bolton Association	H	3–0	R. Steel (2), Struthers
29 December 1883	Round 3	Irwell Springs	H	8–1	Davenport (2), Fallon (2), R. Steel (2), Struthers, Own Goal
19 January 1884	Round 4	Notts County	A	2–2 (a.e.t.)	Davenport, Fallon
2 February 1884	Round 4 replay	Notts County	H	1–2	Vaughan

== See also ==
- Bolton Wanderers F.C. seasons
