= 1882–83 Bolton Wanderers F.C. season =

Bolton Wanderers
1882–83 season
- Secretary: Tom Rawthorne
- FA Cup: Third round
- Top goalscorer: League: All: W.G. Struthers
1882 colours	1883 colours

The 1882–83 season was the second season in which Bolton Wanderers competed in a senior competitive football competition. The club entered the FA Cup in November 1882, but were knocked out in the third round by the Welsh club Druids.

== F.A. Cup ==
Date	Round	Opponents	H / A	Result F–A	Scorers
4 November 1882	Round 1	Bootle	H	6–1	Struthers (5), R. Steel
30 November 1882	Round 2	Liverpool Ramblers	A	3–0	Struthers (2), Own goal
6 January 1883	Round 3	Druids	A	0–0	Atherton, Struthers
22 January 1883	Round 3 replay	Druids	H	1–1 (a.e.t.)	Atherton
29 January 1883	Round 3 second replay	Druids	N (at Wrexham)	0–1	

== See also ==
- Bolton Wanderers F.C. seasons
