= 1944–45 Blackpool F.C. season =

English football club season

Blackpool F.C.
1944–45 season
- Manager: Joe Smith
- League North: 20th (first competition); 16th (second competition)
- FA Cup: Competition suspended
- League War Cup: Fourth round (Northern Section)
- Top goalscorer: League: All: Stan Mortensen (14)
Home colours

The 1944–45 season was Blackpool F.C.'s sixth and final season in special wartime football during World War II. They competed in League North, finishing twentieth in the first competition and sixteenth in the second.

Stan Mortensen was the club's top scorer, with fourteen goals in all competitions.
