= Thomas Sinclair =

Thomas Sinclair may refer to:

- Thomas Sinclair (politician, 1857–1940), Northern Irish Member of Parliament
- Thomas Sinclair (politician, 1838–1914), Ulster-Scots businessman and politician
- Thomas Sinclair Jr. (1841–1888), politician in Manitoba, Canada
- Tom Sinclair (born 1958), American athlete
- Tom Sinclair (footballer) (1880–1968), Scottish football goalkeeper
- Tommy Sinclair (footballer, born 1921) (born 1921), English footballer
- Tommy Sinclair (footballer, born 1897) (1897–1967), English footballer
- Tommy Sinclair (Scottish footballer), Scottish footballer
- Thomas Sinclair (writer), a contributor to the British Dictionary of National Biography
- Thomas Sinclair (died 1881), American businessman whose widow built the Brucemore mansion in Cedar Rapids, Iowa
- Thomas Sinclair, Australian actor in silent films such as The Kelly Gang (1920)
- Tom Sinclair, coxswain of Scottish lifeboat RNLB Emma Constance
- Thomas Sinclair, fictional character in the Killzone video games
- Albert Thomas Sinclair, American lawyer who corresponded with Archduke Joseph Karl of Austria about the Romani language

== See also ==
- Thomas Sinclair Harrison (1898–?), South African World War I fighter ace
- Thomas Sinclair Holden (1906–1973), Australian politician and judge
- Sinclair Thomas (born 1968), British wheelchair basketball player and coach
