= 1945 Football League War Cup final =

- Event: 1945 Football League War Cup
Chelsea	Bolton Wanderers
1	2
- Date: 2 June 1945
- Venue: Stamford Bridge, London
- Attendance: 38,840

The 1945 Football League War Cup final was the last final of the Football League War Cup, a cup competition held in England during the Second World War as a replacement for the suspended FA Cup. The match was a play-off between the winners of the North and South competitions, respectively Bolton Wanderers and Chelsea. The match took place on 2 June 1945, and was staged at Stamford Bridge, Chelsea's home ground. Bolton won the match 2–1.

== Match details ==
2 June 1945

Chelsea	1–2	Bolton Wanderers
Rooke 34'		Hunt 77'; Hamlett 84' (pen.)

Stamford Bridge, London
Attendance: 38,840

Chelsea	Bolton Wanderers

1	(Scotland) Ian Black
2	(Scotland) Ralph Cowan
3	(England) George Hardwick
4	(Scotland) Robert Russell
5	(Scotland) John Harris
6	(England) Dick Foss
7	(England) George Wardle
8	(England) Alex Machin
9	(England) Ronnie Rooke
10	(England) Len Goulden
11	(England) Jimmy Bain
Manager:
(Scotland) Billy Birrell

1	(England) Bill Fielding
2	(England) Dick Threlfall
3	(England) Harry Hubbick
4	(England) George Taylor
5	(England) Lol Hamlett
6	(England) Daniel Murphy
7	(England) Thomas Woodward
8	(England) George Hunt
9	(England) Nat Lofthouse
10	(England) Malcolm Barrass
11	(Scotland) Willie Moir
Manager:
(England) Walter Rowley
