= 1904 FA Cup final =

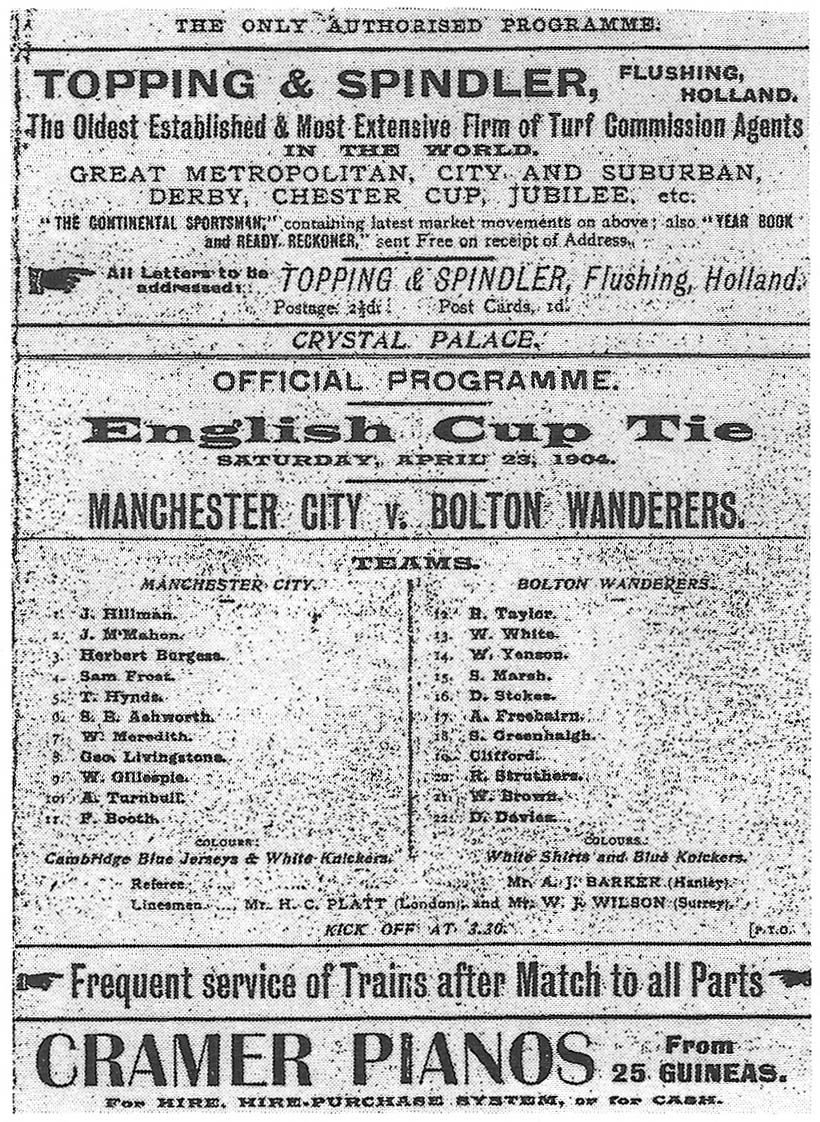
- The match programme cover
- Event: 1903–04 FA Cup
Manchester City	Bolton Wanderers
1	0
- Date: 23 April 1904
- Venue: Crystal Palace, London
- Referee: A. J. Barker
- Attendance: 61,374

The 1904 FA Cup final was a football match between Bolton Wanderers and Manchester City on 23 April 1904 at Crystal Palace in London. The showpiece match of English football's primary cup competition, the Football Association Challenge Cup (better known as the FA Cup), it was the 33rd Cup final, and the tenth at Crystal Palace.

Each team progressed through four rounds to reach the final. Manchester City were a First Division team chasing a league and cup double; Bolton Wanderers were a mid-table Second Division team. Consequently, most observers anticipated a Manchester City win. In a close match featuring strong defensive play, Manchester City won 1–0. The goal, scored by Billy Meredith, was disputed by those with Bolton sympathies, who believed Meredith to be offside. The victory gave Manchester City their first major honour.

== Build-up ==
The final was held at Crystal Palace, the tenth final played at the venue. Neither club had previously won the competition. Bolton reached the final in 1894, but were beaten comfortably by Notts County, losing 4–1 at Goodison Park despite a strong performance by goalkeeper John Sutcliffe.

Manchester City
Round	Opposition	Score
1st	Sunderland (h)	3–2
2nd	Woolwich Arsenal (a)	2-0
3rd	Middlesbrough (a)	0–0
3rd	Middlesbrough (a)	3–1
Semi-final	The Wednesday (n)	3–0

In their passage to the final Manchester City faced opposition from the top division in all but one round. Second Division Woolwich Arsenal, City's opponents in the second round, were the exception. Sunderland were defeated 3–2 at Hyde Road in the first round, and the visit to Arsenal yielded a 2–0 win. A club record crowd of 30,022 watched the quarter-final against Middlesbrough, but a 0–0 draw meant a replay at Ayresome Park was required, which City won 3–1 to set up a semi-final against The Wednesday. Two goals from Turnbull and one from Meredith gave City a 3–0 win at Goodison Park.

Bolton's cup run started slowly, with a replay required to overcome non-league Reading. A 4–1 victory over Southampton secured a quarter-final berth at Sheffield United. As a Second Division team with a poor away record, Wanderers were clear underdogs in the quarter-final, particularly in view of Sheffield United's strong home form. Nevertheless, Bolton prevailed 2–0 courtesy of goals by Sam Marsh and Billy Yenson. At this point Marsh had scored in every round of the competition. A 1–0 defeat of Derby County in the semi-final took Bolton to the final.

Bolton Wanderers
Round	Opposition	Score
1st	Reading (a)	1-1
1st	Reading (h)	3–2
2nd	Southampton (h)	4-1
3rd	Sheffield United (a)	2–0
Semi-final	Derby County (n)	1–0

Though Lancashire was a football stronghold in the early years of the professional game, providing a large proportion of Football League teams, the cup final had never been contested between two Lancashire clubs until the 1904 final. 30,000 supporters from the region travelled to London, sparking press reports of records for north–south rail travel. Lacking alternative accommodation, several thousand slept on the platforms at Euston and St Pancras. A jovial atmosphere built up, with the Manchester Industrial Boys Band playing Hiawatha. However, in London itself, the match received less attention than a final featuring a southern team would have done. Tickets in an uncovered stand cost 5s.

Prior to the match the teams both stayed in the suburb of West Norwood, within walking distance of Crystal Palace. Manchester City arrived on 21 April, and were joined the following day by the Bolton Wanderers, who had spent the earlier part of the week at a training camp in Norbreck, near Blackpool. London's Morning Leader described the relaxed nature of the Manchester City players, commenting that "they might have been a tug of war eleven out for a holiday".

The majority of observers, including The Times correspondent, expected a win for Manchester City, as they had performed strongly over the League season, lying second in the First Division on the day of the final, whereas Bolton were a mid-table Second Division side whose most talented forward, Boyd, was sidelined through injury. Manchester City had one injury worry, Billy Holmes, who had missed the previous league match after sustaining an injury against Nottingham Forest. George Livingstone, initially a doubt, was passed fit well in advance. When the final line-ups were announced, both teams had one change from the semi-finals. For Bolton, Boyd was replaced by Clifford, who had not played in any of the previous rounds, and Archie Freebairn switched to Boyd's usual flank "with a view to coping with Meredith". For Manchester City, Sam Ashworth replaced Holmes. Both teams played 2–3–5, the standard formation of the period.

== Match ==
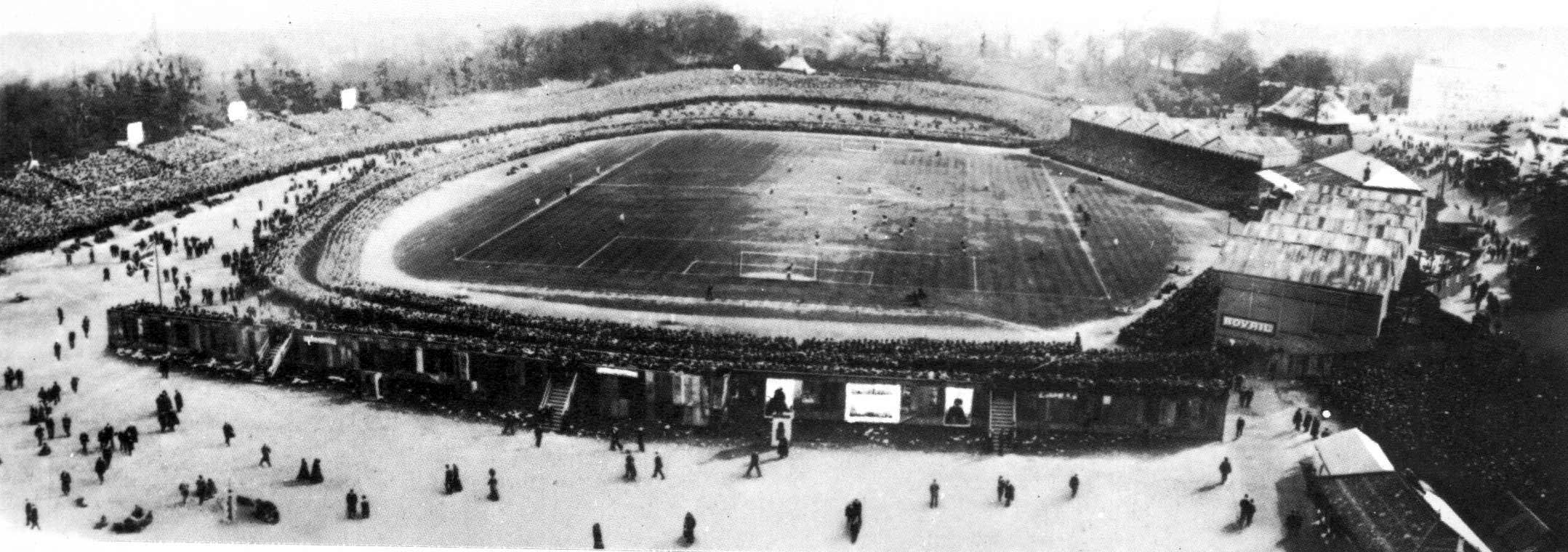
Crystal Palace stadium

The match took place in good weather, with the crowd approximately 62,000. Dignitaries present included Prime Minister Arthur Balfour, Colonial Secretary Alfred Lyttelton, Postmaster General Lord Stanley and Lord Kinnaird. Also in attendance were cricketers WG Grace, GL Jessop and CB Fry, plus several members of the Australian cricket team. Also in attendance was Willie Maley, brother of Manchester City's manager Tom and manager of Celtic whose team had won the Scottish Cup the week before by beating Rangers 3-2 Manchester City entered the field of play first, led by captain Billy Meredith, with the Bolton team emerging shortly after. Manchester City won the toss, and elected to play towards the southern end of the ground in the first half, with the wind at their backs. The opening exchanges were fairly even, the Athletic News reporting that "For some time there was little to choose between the rivals", but that "Manchester were the more systematic and scientific".

Twenty minutes into the game, a pass to the right wing by George Livingstone eluded Bolton's Archie Freebairn, and reached Meredith, who dribbled beyond Bob Struthers for a run on goal. He shot to goalkeeper Davies' left, scoring the opening goal. Reporters with Bolton sympathies, such as ex-Bolton secretary JJ Bentley, claimed the goal to be offside, though the Bolton players made no appeal to the referee. The goal led to one over-exuberant Manchester City supporter invading the pitch, and subsequently being escorted away by police, though in contrast to the modern image of the football hooligan, the Sporting Chronicle reported that the man was then allowed back onto the terraces, as the police had been impressed by the level of devotion that he had demonstrated.

Bolton had the majority of possession in the second half, aside from a ten-minute spell, but the performance of the Manchester City defence limited Bolton's goalscoring opportunities. The Manchester Evening News singled out Herbert Burgess for particular praise in this respect, writing that City had "considerable reason to be thankful to their left-back, Burgess... ...the famous International played a game which has rarely been surpassed". The Bolton Evening News took a rather different view, claiming that physical play by Burgess provoked the ire of the crowd. Bolton's adoption of "kick and rush" tactics resulted in a spell of pressure, but to no avail. Bolton's best chance came in the final five minutes, a shot by White which "missed by inches". The match finished 1–0, giving Manchester City their first major honour.

=== Match details ===
23 April 1904
15:20 GMT

Manchester City	1–0	Bolton Wanderers
Meredith 23'

Crystal Palace, London
Attendance: 61,374
Referee: A. J. Barker

Manchester City	Bolton Wanderers

Goalkeeper	Jack Hillman
Full-back	Johnny McMahon
Full-back	Herbert Burgess
Half-back	Sammy Frost
Half-back	Tommy Hynds
Half-back	Sam Ashworth
Forward	Billy Meredith (c)
Forward	George Livingstone
Forward	Billie Gillespie
Forward	Sandy Turnbull
Forward	Frank Booth
Secretary:
Tom Maley

Goalkeeper	Dai Davies
Full-back	William Brown
Full-back	Bob Struthers
Half-back	Robert Clifford
Half-back	Sam Greenhalgh
Half-back	Archie Freebairn
Forward	David Stokes
Forward	Sam Marsh
Forward	Billy Yenson
Forward	Wattie White
Forward	Bob Taylor
Secretary:
John Somerville

Match rules

- 90 minutes.
- 30 minutes of extra-time if necessary.
- Replay if scores still level.

== Post-match ==
Manchester City captain Meredith received the trophy from the serving prime minister, Arthur Balfour, a patron of the club. Alfred Lyttelton then made a speech praising the efforts of the two teams. Lyttelton, a former footballer himself, compared the play in the final with the match he played for the England team against Scotland in 1877. Noting that "the game is a good deal changed", he emphasised how the final had demonstrated the importance of teamwork, in contrast to his day when "each man played for himself".

While most of those in attendance behaved well, with few reports of disturbances, later in the day several young men "with provincial accents" appeared at a west London police court charged with drunken disorder. Due to "offence caused by 'scrimmage'", they were issued with fines averaging 10s.

Manchester City did not return directly to Manchester, but instead went to Liverpool, as the club's final league fixture was scheduled for Monday afternoon at Everton. At this point Manchester City were still in contention for the league title. However, a 1–0 defeat at Goodison Park eliminated City from the title race and confirmed The Wednesday as champions. The team arrived in Manchester in that evening, and travelled to the Town Hall to commence a victory parade. From the Town Hall, the parade travelled to Ardwick Conservative Club, via Deansgate, Market Street and Ardwick Green. The number of people lining the route was five times as many as had attended a recent visit by the Prince and Princess of Wales.

== Bibliography ==
- Creighton, John (1993). Manchester City: Moments To Remember. Ammanford: Sigma Press. ISBN 1-85058-397-8.
- Gent, Leslie (2004). Making Headlines: The History of Bolton Wanderers Football Club as Seen Through the Eyes the Pages of the Bolton Evening News. Bristol: Sports Programme. ISBN 978-0-9537444-4-2.
- Harding, John (1998). Football Wizard – The Billy Meredith Story. London: Robson Books. ISBN 1-86105-137-9.
- James, Gary (2006). Manchester City – The Complete Record. Derby: Breedon. ISBN 1-85983-512-0.
- James, Gary (2005). The Official Manchester City Hall of Fame. Hamlyn. ISBN 0-600-61282-1.
- James, Gary (2008). Manchester – A Football History. Halifax: James Ward. ISBN 978-0-9558127-0-5.
- Marland, Simon (1989). Bolton Wanderers – A Complete Record 1877–1989. Derby: Breedon. ISBN 978-0-907969-51-8.
- Pawson, Tony (1972). 100 Years of the FA Cup. London: Heinemann. ISBN 0-330-23274-6.
- Ward, Andrew (1984). The Manchester City Story. Derby: Breedon. ISBN 0-907969-05-4.
