= 1885–86 Bolton Wanderers F.C. season =

Bolton Wanderers
1885–86 season
- Secretary: John Bentley
- FA Cup: Third round
- Top goalscorer: League: All: Fallon
Home colours

The 1885–86 season was the fourth season in which Bolton Wanderers competed in a senior competitive football competition. The club entered the FA Cup in October 1885, but were knocked out in the third round by Preston North End and subsequently disqualified for professionalism.

== F.A. Cup ==
Date	Round	Opponents	H / A	Result F–A	Scorers
10 October 1885	Round 1	Eagley	H	6–0	Gregory, Fallon (2), Hough, Bullough, Own goal
21 November 1885	Round 2	Rawtenstall	A	3–3	
12 December 1885	Round 3	Preston North End	H	2–3	Davenport, Struthers

== See also ==
- Bolton Wanderers F.C. seasons
