= Bob Struthers =

English footballer

Personal information
- Full name: Robert John Struthers
- Date of birth: 1879
- Place of birth: Liverpool, England
- Date of death: 1959 (aged 79–80)
- Position: Full back

Senior career*
Years	Team	Apps	(Gls)
1894–1895	Temple (Liverpool)		
1895–1896	Kirkdale		
1896–1897	Rock Ferry		
1897–1898	Everton	0	(0)
1898–1900	Gravesend United		
1900–1901	Portsmouth		
1901–1907	Bolton Wanderers	130	(0)
1907	Bradford Park Avenue		
Total		130	(0)
- * Club domestic league appearances and goals

Robert John Struthers (1879–1959) was an English footballer who played in the Football League for Bolton Wanderers with whom he played in the 1904 FA Cup Final, losing 1–0 to Manchester City.
