= Sammy Frost =

English footballer (1883–1926)

Samuel Frost (1883 – March 1926) was a footballer who played as a half back for Manchester City between 1901 and 1906.

Frost made his Manchester City debut in September 1901 in a 3–1 defeat against Everton. He was part of the City team which defeated Bolton Wanderers 1–0 to win the 1904 FA Cup Final.

He made 103 league appearances for Manchester City and scored 4 goals. He subsequently played for Millwall before recurring knee ailments forced him to retire. In 1926, he killed himself in Poplar, London, by taking strychnine.

== Honours ==
Manchester City

- FA Cup (1): 1904
