= William Brown (footballer, born 1876) =

Scottish footballer

Personal information
- Full name: William Brown
- Date of birth: 1876
- Place of birth: Hurlford, Scotland
- Position: Full back

Senior career*
Years	Team	Apps	(Gls)
1897–1898	Hurlford Thistle		
1898–1899	Beith		
1899–1904	Bolton Wanderers	106	(0)
1904–1906	Aston Villa	12	(0)
1906–1907	Plymouth Argyle		
1907	Crystal Palace		
Total		90	(33)
- * Club domestic league appearances and goals

William Brown (1876–unknown) was a Scottish footballer who played in the Football League for Aston Villa and Bolton Wanderers. He played in the 1904 FA Cup Final for Bolton as they lost 1–0 to Manchester City.
