= Archie Freebairn =

Scottish footballer

Personal information
- Full name: Archibald Freebairn
- Date of birth: 1870
- Place of birth: Whiteinch, Scotland
- Date of death: 1917 (aged 46–47)
- Position: Wing half

Senior career*
Years	Team	Apps	(Gls)
1892–1893	Westburn		
1893–1894	Partick Thistle	11	(0)
1894–1907	Bolton Wanderers	286	(9)
Total		297	(9)
- * Club domestic league appearances and goals

Archibald Freebairn (1870–1917) was a Scottish footballer who played in the Football League for Bolton Wanderers. He featured on the losing side in the 1904 FA Cup Final.

His brothers Willie and David were also footballers, all three featuring for Partick Thistle.
