= Robert Clifford (footballer) =

English footballer

Personal information
- Full name: Robert Clifford
- Date of birth: 21 November 1883
- Place of birth: Rankinston, Scotland
- Position: Half-back

Senior career*
Years	Team	Apps	(Gls)
1901–1902	Rankinston Mountaineers		
1902–1903	Trabboch		
1903–1908	Bolton Wanderers	152	(5)
1909–1910	Everton	37	(0)
1910–1911	South Liverpool		
1911–1912	Fulham	8	(0)
Total		197	(5)
- * Club domestic league appearances and goals

Robert Clifford (21 November 1883–unknown) was a Scottish footballer who played in the Football League for Bolton Wanderers, Everton and Fulham. He played in the 1904 FA Cup Final for Bolton, losing 1–0 to Manchester City.
