= Tom Barlow (English footballer) =

English footballer

Personal information
- Full name: Thomas Henry Barlow
- Date of birth: 18 December 1874
- Place of birth: Bolton, England
- Date of death: 25 November 1944 (aged 69)
- Place of death: Bolton, England
- Height: 5 ft 9 in (1.75 m)
- Position: Inside forward

Senior career*
Years	Team	Apps	(Gls)
18??–1898	Halliwell Rovers		
1898–1902	Bolton Wanderers	81	(24)
1902–1903	Southampton	22	(6)
1903–1904	Bolton Wanderers	5	(1)
1904–1905	Millwall Athletic		
1905–1906	Atherton Church House		
1906–1907	Oldham Athletic		
Total		108	(31)
- * Club domestic league appearances and goals

Thomas Henry Barlow (18 December 1874 – 25 November 1944) was an English footballer who played as an inside forward around the turn of the 20th century, spending most of his career with Bolton Wanderers.

== Football career ==
Barlow was born in Bolton to Samuel and Elizabeth Barlow. After playing for Halliwell Rovers of the Lancashire League, he joined Bolton Wanderers in May 1898. He was soon established at the inside-left position, playing sixteen matches, with five goals, but was unable to prevent Bolton being relegated to the Second Division at the end of the season.

In the following season, he made only fourteen League appearances, with newly signed Jack Picken being preferred by secretary/manager Frank Brettell. At the end of the season, Bolton regained their place in the First Division as runners-up to The Wednesday. Back in the top flight, Picken was moved to inside-right and Barlow once again became settled in the No. 10 shirt, scoring 10 goals from 28 appearances in the 1901–02 season.

He remained at Bolton until the summer of 1902, when he moved to the south coast to join Southampton of the Southern League. At the "Saints", he was considered to be "a capture" and was described in the local press as "a player who combines good ball control and distribution with legitimate trickery". He made his debut in the opening match of the 1902–03 season, scoring twice in a 6–0 victory over Brentford (with three goals from Jack Fraser).

His performances at The Dell soon impressed the England selectors and he was chosen to represent "The South" in a trial match against "The North" played at White Hart Lane, although he was not selected for the national side. By early 1903, Barlow was beginning to feel "homesick" and following the return of Fred Harrison from injury in January he lost his place in the side, making only two further appearances at left-half. At the end of the season, when Saints won the Southern League title for the fifth time in seven years, Barlow was granted a transfer back to Burnden Park.

Barlow only made five league appearances in the 1903–04 season, with Wattie White now established at inside-left, and in the summer of 1904 he returned to the Southern League to join Millwall Athletic. In his two spells with Bolton, he made 90 appearances in League and Cup matches, scoring 25 goals.

He remained at Millwall for one season before returning to Lancashire to join Atherton Church House of the Lancashire Combination before finishing his career at Oldham Athletic, playing their final season in the Lancashire Combination, at the end of which they were champions and elected to the Football League.

== Honours ==
Southampton

- Southern League championship: 1902–03
