= Danny Winter =

Welsh footballer (1918–2004)

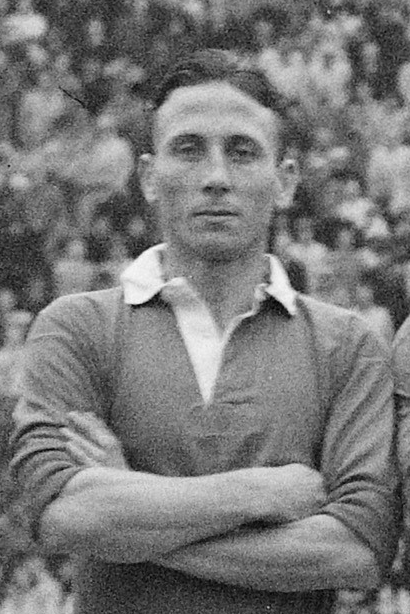
- Winter lining up for Chelsea in November 1947

Personal information
- Full name: Daniel Thomas Winter
- Date of birth: 14 June 1918
- Place of birth: Tonypandy, Wales
- Date of death: 22 March 2004 (aged 85)
- Place of death: Trealaw, Wales
- Position: Right back

Senior career*
Years	Team	Apps	(Gls)
–1935	Maes-y-Haf		
1935–1939	Bolton Wanderers	34	(0)
1946–1951	Chelsea	131	(0)
- Worcester City
Total		165	(0)
- * Club domestic league appearances and goals

Daniel Thomas Winter (14 June 1918 – 22 March 2004) was a Welsh footballer who played in the Football League for Bolton Wanderers and Chelsea.

== Career ==
Winter started his footballing career at 15 years of age playing for local team Maes yr Haf at Garth Park, Trealaw in the Rhondda Valley.

Whilst playing for Maes yr Haf, young Danny's footballing skills didn't go unnoticed and he received offers from Arsenal and Bolton Wanderers. Danny chose Bolton Wanderers, as in addition to football coaching, some office based training was included.

On his 17th birthday, Danny turned professional and he played his first game for the first team against Sunderland in February 1937. Danny played regularly for the first team between August 1938 and May 1939.

August 1939 saw Danny play three times before war was declared. At one of those home games, the captain Harry Goslin encouraged fans and players to join him in signing up for the military. Shortly after the entire team signed up for the army, joining 53rd (Bolton) Field Regiment, Royal Artillery, which formed part of the British Expeditionary Force that saw action in the Battle of France and was evacuated from Dunkirk in May/June 1940.

During the war, the Football Authorities tried to keep football going for entertainment and with Danny being stationed at Woolwich, he became a guest player with Chelsea between 1943 and 1945.

In May 1945 Danny played for Chelsea against Millwall at Wembley in the Football League (South) Cup final; Chelsea won 2:0. Danny received his medal from King George VI.

Danny chose to stay in London and following his demob around October 1945, he continued playing for Chelsea as a guest player. In December 1945 Chelsea formally requested Danny's transfer from Bolton Wanderers his transfer fee was £5,000. Danny played regularly for Chelsea until 1951 and often captained the team when regular captain John Harris wasn't playing.

During 1945 Danny played twice for Wales and whilst at Chelsea Danny became a member of the Players Union Committee which later became the Professional Footballers Association. Danny never played for Wales again.

== Personal life ==
Following a period of home leave during 1941, Danny was on his way to catch a train back to barracks when during an air raid, he was knocked down by a car and suffered injuries which meant several weeks in different hospitals. Danny was released from hospital for a few days to marry the love of his life Ellen Harris, in Bolton on 29 November 1941. Following his marriage Danny spent several months recovering from his injuries at a convalescent home in Cheshire.

Due to injuries sustained when he was knocked down, Danny was deemed unfit for active service abroad and was posted to Woolwich Barracks where he was assigned to an anti aircraft gun battery.

Following the end of his footballing career Danny returned home to the Rhondda where he spent many years in the family building business.

Throughout the 1970s, 80's and 90's, Danny was a regular at the Professional Footballers Association dinners in London. He also took an active part in the 1940 Dunkirk Veterans' Association, Swansea branch for many years.

In 1994 Danny was diagnosed with Alzheimers, but was able to continue living at home and was looked after by his wife and son. Following several years of ill health, Danny died at his home aged 85 and he is buried in Trealaw Cemetery overlooking Garth Park playing fields where his footballing career began 70 years earlier.
