= 1945 Football League War Cup South final =

1945 Football League War Cup South Final
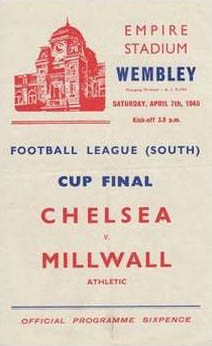
- Official programme
- Event: 1945 Football League War Cup
Chelsea	Millwall
2	0
- Date: 7 April 1945
- Venue: Wembley Stadium, London
- Attendance: 90,000

The 1945 Football League War Cup South Final was the last final of the regional Football League War Cup, an unofficial cup competition held in southern England during the Second World War as a replacement for the suspended FA Cup. The match took place at Wembley Stadium on 7 April 1945 and was won by Chelsea, who beat Millwall 2–0. The trophy is now on display in the Chelsea museum at Stamford Bridge. The match was attended by King George VI, the Queen, and Princess Elizabeth II, along with a number of high Parliamentary officials and military figures, including Lt. Gen. John C. H. Lee, commanding general of the Communications Zone, ETO, the logistics side of the U.S. Army, European Theater of Operations.

A month later, at Stamford Bridge, Chelsea contested a play-off against the winners of the equivalent North final, Bolton Wanderers, which Bolton won 2-1.

== Match summary ==
This was Chelsea's second consecutive appearance in the competition's final; they had lost to Charlton Athletic in the 1944 final and fielded four survivors from that match (captain John Harris, Dickie Foss, George Hardwick and Joe Payne). Millwall fielded Sam Bartram and Sailor Brown, who had been a part of the victorious Charlton team in 1944. Both teams wore their away colours for the match, Chelsea red and Millwall white.

The Times' correspondent reported that the crowd "must have been sadly disappointed at the quality of play", but Chelsea "were the sounder in defence... and produced the majority of what good attacking movements there were." Millwall held their own in the first half, but a ten minute spell after half-time in which Chelsea scored twice was sufficient to win them the match. The crowd of 90,000 was the highest for a club match during the war. King George VI, Queen Elizabeth, their daughter the future Elizabeth II, King Haakon VII of Norway and Lord Wavell, Viceroy of India, were among those in attendance. After the match, the King presented Chelsea captain Harris with the cup.

== Match details ==
7 April 1945

Chelsea	2–0	Millwall
Wardle 47'; McDonald 52'

Wembley Stadium, London
Attendance: 90,000

Chelsea	Millwall

1	(Scotland) Ian Black
2	(Wales) Danny Winter
3	(England) George Hardwick
4	(Scotland) Robert Russell
5	(Scotland) John Harris
6	(England) Dickie Foss
7	(England) George Wardle
8	(England) Les Smith
9	(England) Joe Payne
10	(England) Len Goulden
11	(England) John McDonald
Manager:
(Scotland) Billy Birrell

1	(England) Sam Bartram
2	(England) Reginald Dudley
3	(England) George Fisher
4	(England) George Ludford
5	(England) Ted Smith
6	(England) Leonard Tyler
7	(England) Sid Rawlings
8	(England) Sailor Brown
9	(England) Jimmy Jinks
10	(Scotland) Tom Brown
11	(England) Clifton Williams
Manager:
(England) Jack Cock
