= Alex Machin (footballer) =

English footballer (1920–2005)

Alex Machin (6 July 1920 – 18 February 2005) was an English footballer who played for Chelsea and Plymouth Argyle as an inside forward. Machin signed for Chelsea in July 1944 and remained with the club for four years, making 61 appearances and scoring 9 goals.
