= George Ludford =

English footballer & manager (1915–2001)

Personal information
- Full name: George Albert Ludford
- Date of birth: 22 March 1915
- Place of birth: Barnet, England
- Date of death: 2 January 2001 (aged 85)
- Place of death: Enfield, England
- Height: 5 ft 7 1/2 in (1.71 m)
- Position: Defender

Youth career
- Tottenham Juniors

Senior career*
| Years | Team | Apps | (Gls) |
| 1933–1934 | →Enfield (loan) | ? | (?) |
| 1934–1936 | →Northfleet United (loan) | ? | (101) |
| 1936–1950 | Tottenham Hotspur | 75 | (8) |

Managerial career
- 1957–1965: Enfield
- * Club domestic league appearances and goals

George Albert Ludford (22 March 1915 – 2 January 2001) was an English professional footballer who played for Tottenham Juniors, Enfield, Northfleet United and Tottenham Hotspur.

== Football career ==
Ludford began his career with Tottenham Juniors at the age of 14. He was loaned out to Enfield in September 1933 before playing for the Tottenham Hotspur "nursery" team Northfleet United. After scoring 101 goals during the 1935–36 season, he was offered a contract with Tottenham Hotspur and duly made his debut away against West Ham United on 29 August 1936. The defender spent a total of 27 years with the White Hart Lane club which included a spell as a coach. Ludford played a total of 81 matches and scored on nine occasions in all competitions between 1936 and 1950. He also appeared as a guest player for West Ham United in World War II.

== Management and coaching career ==
After his playing career had ended, Ludford joined the Tottenham backroom staff as a coach. In 1957, he was offered the post of manager at Enfield. During his eight years in charge, the club were Athenian League winners in 1962 and 1963. They also made an appearance in the FA Amateur Cup final of 1964 when they were runners up against Crook Town. He took the position of stadium manager at the club until his retirement in 1980. Ludford died in Enfield in 2001.
