= Dick Threlfall =

English footballer

Personal information
- Full name: Joseph Richard Threlfall
- Date of birth: 5 March 1916
- Place of birth: Ashton-under-Lyne, England
- Date of death: 1994 (aged 78)
- Position: Defender

Senior career*
Years	Team	Apps	(Gls)
1945–1947	Bolton Wanderers	3	(0)
1947–1948	Halifax Town	30	(0)
Total		33	(0)
- * Club domestic league appearances and goals

Joseph Richard Threlfall (5 March 1916 – 1994) was an English footballer who played in the Football League for Bolton Wanderers and Halifax Town.
