= Ernie Forrest =

English footballer (1919–1987)

Personal information
- Full name: Ernest Forrest
- Date of birth: 19 February 1919
- Place of birth: Sunderland, England
- Date of death: January 1987 (aged 67)
- Place of death: Bolton, England
- Position: Right-half

Senior career*
Years	Team	Apps	(Gls)
1938–1948	Bolton Wanderers	69	(1)
1948–1949	Grimsby Town	33	(1)
1949–1950	Millwall	37	(4)
1950–1951	Darwen	?	(?)
Total		139	(6)
- * Club domestic league appearances and goals

Ernest Forrest (19 February 1919 – January 1987) was an English footballer who played as a right-half in the Football League.

During World War II, Forrest enlisted in the 53rd (Bolton) Field Regiment, Royal Artillery, along with many of his teammates.
