= Eddie Hopkinson =

English footballer

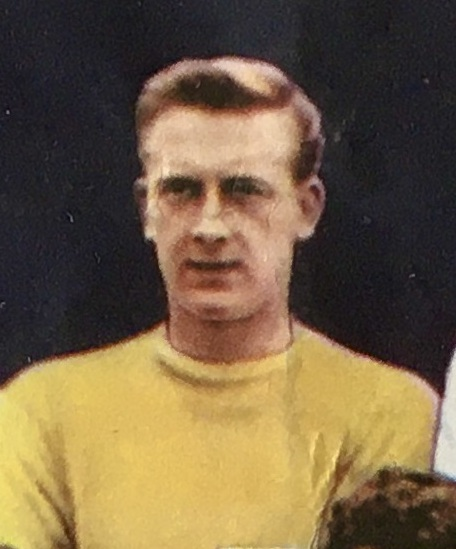

Personal information
- Full name: Edward Hopkinson
- Date of birth: 29 October 1935
- Place of birth: Wheatley Hill, County Durham, England
- Date of death: 25 April 2004 (aged 68)
- Height: 1.72 m (5 ft 8 in)
- Position: Goalkeeper

Senior career*
Years	Team	Apps	(Gls)
1951–1952	Oldham Athletic	3	(0)
1952–1970	Bolton Wanderers	519	(0)
Total		522	(0)

International career
1957–1959	England	14	(0)

Managerial career
- 1975: Stockport County
- * Club domestic league appearances and goals

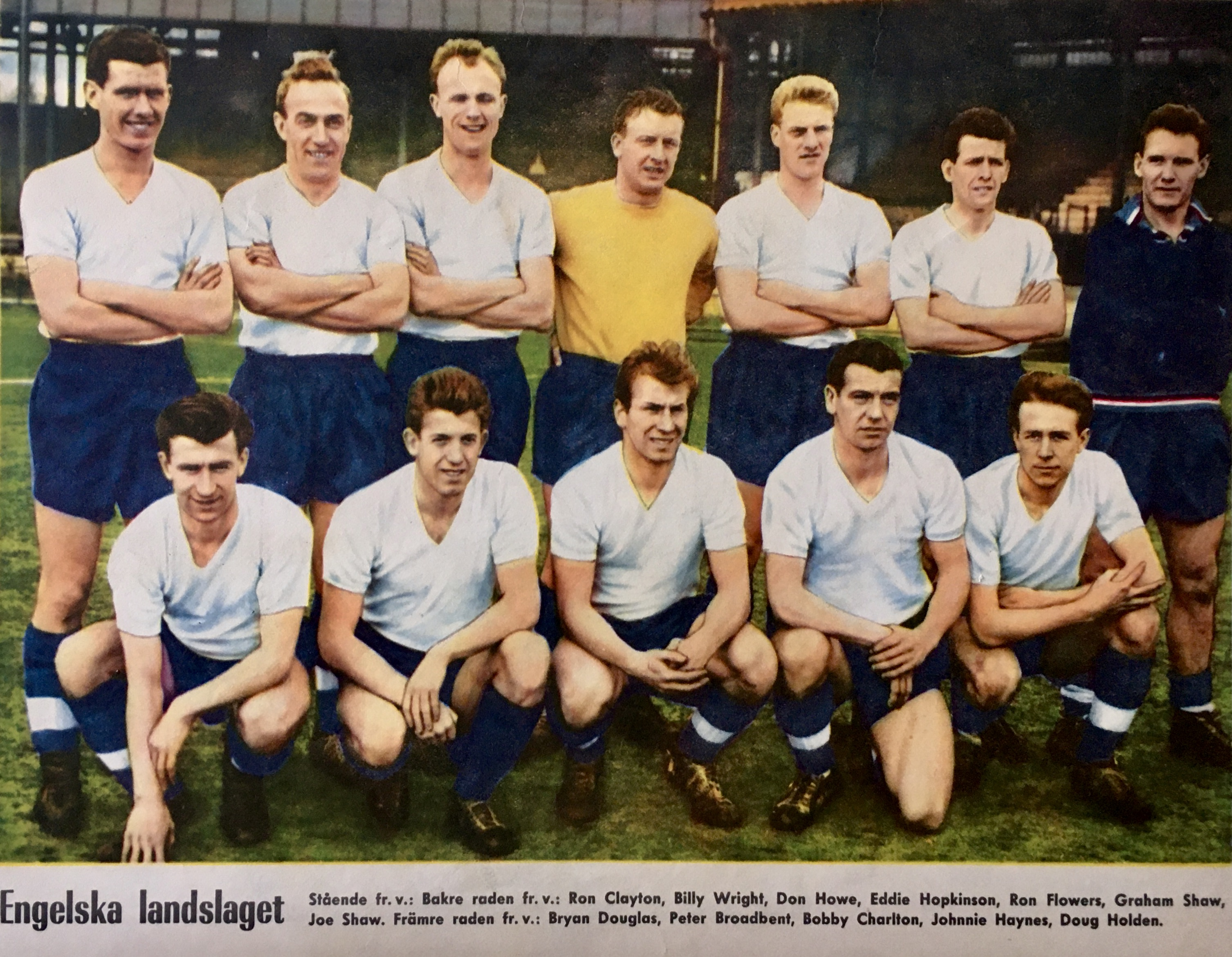
England national football team at Empire Stadium, London 11th April 1959. From the left, standing: Ronnie Clayton, Billy Wright (captain), Don Howe, Eddie Hopkinson, Ron Flowers, Graham Swaw, Joe Shaw; front row: Bryan Douglas, Peter Broadbent, Bobby Charlton, Johnny Haynes and Doug Holden.

Edward Hopkinson (29 October 1935 – 25 April 2004) was an English football goalkeeper. He was born in Wheatley Hill, near Peterlee, County Durham.

During his club career he played for Oldham Athletic and Bolton Wanderers, the latter from August 1952 to November 1969, where he holds the club record for appearances (578 matches). He earned 14 caps for the England national football team from 1957 to 1959, and was England's reserve goalkeeper at the 1958 FIFA World Cup. He also won 6 Under-23 caps for England. In 1958 he won an FA Cup winners medal, keeping a clean sheet against Manchester United. He was an assistant trainer at Bolton Wanderers until he became assistant manager at Stockport County in 1974. He later worked for a chemical company as a company representative. Eusebio played in his 1971 testimonial game. He also was manager for Ashton United.

== Honours ==
Bolton Wanderers

- FA Cup: 1957–58
