= George Hunt (footballer, born 1910) =

English footballer

Personal information
- Full name: George Samuel Hunt
- Date of birth: 22 February 1910
- Place of birth: Mexborough, England
- Date of death: 19 September 1996 (aged 86)
- Place of death: Bolton, England
- Height: 5 ft 8 in (1.73 m)
- Positions: Inside forward; centre forward

Youth career
- Regent Street Congregational

Senior career*
Years	Team	Apps	(Gls)
1929–1930	Chesterfield	14	(9)
1930–1937	Tottenham Hotspur	185	(125)
1937–1937	Arsenal	18	(3)
1938–1946	Bolton Wanderers	45	(24)
1946–1948	Sheffield Wednesday	32	(8)
Total		294	(169)

International career
1933	England	3	(1)
- * Club domestic league appearances and goals

George Samuel Hunt (22 February 1910 – 19 September 1996) was an English footballer who scored 169 goals from 294 appearances in the Football League playing for Chesterfield, Tottenham Hotspur, Arsenal, Bolton Wanderers and Sheffield Wednesday. An inside forward or centre forward, Hunt was capped three times for England in 1933. After he finished playing, he went into coaching with Bolton Wanderers.

== Club career ==
Hunt was born in Mexborough, Yorkshire, and spent his early career playing for local sides in his native county, and had unsuccessful trials with Barnsley, Sheffield United and Port Vale. He eventually joined Chesterfield from Barnsley-based club Regent Street Congregational in 1929. In his only season there he scored 9 times in 14 Third Division North matches, as well as 25 from 28 for their Midland League team.

Hunt moved on from Chesterfield to Tottenham Hotspur in June 1930 for a £1,500 fee. He spent seven seasons with the club, and was a prolific goalscorer. He was the club's top scorer for three consecutive seasons, from 1931–32 to 1933–34, and his 32 league goals in 1932–33 helped Tottenham gain promotion to the First Division. His form dipped, but he still took his totals to 138 goals from 198 appearances in League and FA Cup, and remains, as of the end of the 2021–22 season, seventh in Tottenham's all-time scorers list.

His goalscoring attracted the attention of Spurs' neighbours and rivals Arsenal, who signed him for £7,500 in 1937, making him the first player to move directly from Spurs to Arsenal since Peter Kyle in 1906. He was intended as a replacement for Ted Drake who was injured at the time. He made his debut on 1 October 1937 against Manchester City at Highbury, and went on to play 21 matches, 18 in the league, as Arsenal won the 1937–38 Football League title.

In March 1938, once Drake returned to fitness, Hunt moved on, sold to First Division Bolton Wanderers for a £4,000 fee. At Bolton, he returned to form and hit 23 goals in the 1938–39 season. After that his career was interrupted by the Second World War, during which he served in the Royal Artillery, although he still played wartime matches for Bolton. He finished his career with Second Division club Sheffield Wednesday between 1946 and 1948.

== International career ==
Hunt won three caps for England. He made his debut in the 1932–33 Home International against Scotland on 1 April 1933, scoring England's goal in a 2–1 defeat at Hampden Park in front of a then world-record attendance of 136,259 spectators. In May, he played twice as part of a tour of central Europe, in a 1–1 draw with Italy at the Stadio Nazionale del PNF in Rome and in a 4–0 win against Switzerland at the Sportplatz Neufeld in Bern. He was called up as a late replacement for England's match against Italy in November 1934, but had to withdraw through injury.

== Later life and career ==
After retiring from playing, Hunt returned to Bolton Wanderers as coach and trainer in 1948, and was a member of the club's backroom staff when they won the 1957–58 FA Cup. He died in hospital in Bolton in 1996, at the age of 86, having suffered from Alzheimer's disease for the last few years of his life.

== Career statistics ==
=== International ===
Appearances and goals by national team and year
National team	Year	Apps	Goals
England	1933	3	1
Total		3	1

Wales score listed first, score column indicates score after each Hunt goal

List of international goals scored by George Hunt
No.	Date	Venue	Cap	Opponent	Score	Result	Competition	Ref.
1	1 April 1933	Hampden Park, Glasgow, Scotland	1	Scotland	1–1	1–2	1932–33 British Home Championship	

== Honours ==
=== Player ===
Arsenal

- Football League First Division: 1937–38

Bolton Wanderers

- Football League War Cup: 1944–45

=== Coach ===
Bolton Wanderers

- FA Cup: 1957–58
