= Tommy Sinclair (footballer, born 1897) =

English footballer

Personal information
- Full name: Thomas Sinclair
- Date of birth: 27 August 1897
- Place of birth: Southport, England
- Date of death: 13 March 1967 (aged 69)
- Place of death: Southport, England
- Height: 5 ft 9 1/2 in (1.77 m)
- Position: Wing half

Senior career*
Years	Team	Apps	(Gls)
1914–1918	Southport Central		
1918–1919	Norwood Crescent		
1919–1920	Port Vale	0	(0)
1921–1930	Southport	320	(21)
1930–1931	Macclesfield	5	(0)
1931–1933	Nelson		
1933–193?	Burscough Rangers		
Total		325+	(21+)
- * Club domestic league appearances and goals

Thomas Sinclair (27 August 1897 – 13 March 1967), sometimes known as Topping Sinclair, was an English professional footballer who made over 300 appearances as a wing half in the Football League for Southport.

== Career statistics ==
Appearances and goals by club, season and competition
Club	Season	League			FA Cup		Other		Total	
Club	Season	Division	Apps	Goals	Apps	Goals	Apps	Goals	Apps	Goals
Port Vale	1919–20	Second Division	0	0	0	0	—		0	0
Southport	1921–22	Third Division North	36	3	4	0	1 (Note: Appearances in Lancashire Senior Cup)	1	41	4
Southport	1922–23	Third Division North	37	2	2	0	0	0	39	2
Southport	1923–24	Third Division North	39	3	4	1	3	0	46	4
Southport	1924–25	Third Division North	37	0	3	0	2	1	42	1
Southport	1925–26	Third Division North	41	5	3	0	3	1	47	6
Southport	1926–27	Third Division North	30	2	5	0	0	0	35	2
Southport	1927–28	Third Division North	42	2	4	0	2	0	48	2
Southport	1928–29	Third Division North	41	3	2	0	2 (Note: 1 appearance in Lancashire Senior Cup, 1 appearance in Liverpool Senior Cup)	0	45	3
Southport	1929–30	Third Division North	17	1	0	0	3 (Note: 2 appearances in Lancashire Senior Cup, 1 appearance in Liverpool Senior Cup)	0	20	1
Southport	Total		320	21	27	1	16	3	363	25
Macclesfield	1930–31	Cheshire League	5	0	—		1 (Note: Appearance in Cheshire Senior Cup)	0	6	0
Career total			325	21	27	1	17	3	369	25
