= Fred Hill (footballer, born 1940) =

English footballer (1940–2021)

Personal information
- Full name: Frederick Hill
- Date of birth: 17 January 1940
- Place of birth: Sheffield, England
- Date of death: 1 October 2021 (aged 81)
- Place of death: Bolton, England
- Position: Inside forward

Youth career
- 1956–1957: Bolton Wanderers

Senior career*
Years	Team	Apps	(Gls)
1957–1969	Bolton Wanderers	375	(74)
1969–1970	Halifax Town	25	(3)
1970–1973	Manchester City	35	(3)
1973–1975	Peterborough United	75	(7)
- Cork Hibernians
- Droylsden
- Radcliffe Borough
Total		510	(87)

International career
	England U23	10	
1962	England	2	(0)
- * Club domestic league appearances and goals

Frederick Hill (17 January 1940 – 1 October 2021) was an English footballer who played at both professional and international levels as an inside forward.

== Club career ==
Born in Sheffield, Hill began his career with the junior team of Bolton Wanderers, turning professional in 1957. He later played for Halifax Town, Manchester City and Peterborough United, making over 500 appearances in the Football League. He later played in Ireland for Cork Hibernians, and in non-league with Droylsden and Radcliffe Borough, before ending his career playing in Sweden. Hill was inducted into the Peterborough United F.C. Hall of Fame in February 2010.

== International career ==
Hill earned two caps for the England national team in 1962, and also earned 10 caps for England at under-23 level.

== Later life and death ==
Hill turned 80 in January 2020. He was twice hospitalised later that year.

Hill died on 1 October 2021, at the age of 81.
