= Samuel Marsh (footballer) =

English footballer

Personal information
- Date of birth: 1879
- Place of birth: Westhoughton, England
- Date of death: Not known
- Position: Forward

Youth career
- Daisy Hill
- Hindley

Senior career*
Years	Team	Apps	(Gls)
????–1902	Atherton Church House	?	(?)
1902–1912	Bolton Wanderers	185	(72)
1912–1913	Bury	3	(0)
- * Club domestic league appearances and goals

Samuel Marsh was an English professional footballer who played in the Football League for Bolton Wanderers as a forward. A long-serving player for the club, he scored 81 goals in 201 appearances.

== Football career ==
Marsh was born in Westhoughton, 4 miles (6 km) southwest of Bolton, Lancashire. After playing his youth football with Daisy Hill and Hindley, he joined Atherton Church House before signing as a professional for Bolton Wanderers in 1902.

He was the top scorer in the Football League Second Division during the 1904–05 season, with 27 goals. At the end of the 1911–12 season, he switched to Bury. In his ten years with Bolton, Marsh made a total of 201 first-team appearances, scoring 81 goals.

After only one season at Bury, in which he played three league matches, Marsh retired.
