= Jim Cassidy (footballer) =

Scottish footballer

Personal information
- Full name: James Cassidy
- Date of birth: 2 December 1869
- Place of birth: Kilmarnock, Scotland
- Date of death: Unknown
- Position: Centre forward

Senior career*
Years	Team	Apps	(Gls)
- Kilmarnock Athletic
- Kilmarnock
- Glasgow Hibernian
1889–1891	Bolton Wanderers	31	(21)
1891	Carfin Shamrock		
1891–1892	Bolton Wanderers	26	(18)
1892	Celtic		
1892–1898	Bolton Wanderers	137	(45)
Total		194	(84)
- * Club domestic league appearances and goals

Jim Cassidy was a Scottish footballer who played most of his career as a centre-forward for Bolton Wanderers in the late 19th century.

Cassidy was born in Kilmarnock on 2 December 1869 and started his football career at Kilmarnock, before moving on to Glasgow Hibernian.

In 1889, Cassidy joined Bolton where he remained (with short spells with Carfin Shamrock and Celtic) for 9 seasons, making 219 appearances, scoring 101 goals.

In an FA Cup tie against Sheffield United on 1 February 1890, Cassidy scored 5 goals in a 13–0 rout, with a further 4 goals coming from Davie Weir.

Cassidy also scored Bolton's consolation goal in the 1894 FA Cup Final – Bolton were 4-0 down to Notts County when, with three minutes to play, County's goalkeeper George Toone came out to meet a Bolton attack only to slip while attempting to clear, leaving Cassidy with an easy goal.

== Honours ==
Bolton Wanderers

- FA Cup finalist: 1894
