= John Byrom (footballer) =

English footballer

Personal information
- Date of birth: 24 April 1944 (age 82)
- Place of birth: Blackburn, England
- Position: Forward

Senior career*
Years	Team	Apps	(Gls)
1961–1966	Blackburn Rovers	108	(45)
1966–1976	Bolton Wanderers	304	(113)
1976–1977	Blackburn Rovers	16	(5)
Total		428	(168)
- * Club domestic league appearances and goals

John Byrom (born 28 July 1944) is an English former footballer who played as a forward.

Byrom started his career at home town club Blackburn Rovers, and joined the club's groundstaff after finishing school. He had won England international youth honours, and made his first-team debut in 1961. He played over 100 games for them before being signed in the summer of 1966 by near neighbours Bolton Wanderers for £25,000. Originally signed to partner Francis Lee and Wyn Davies, when both players quickly left, Byrom became the senior striker. As Bolton moved between the second and third divisions of English football, he scored 130 goals in his ten years at Burnden Park, including twenty when Bolton won the Third Division title in 1973, before moving back to Blackburn for a final season, retiring in 1977 with a knee injury.

On retiring, he took many jobs including driving, sweeping and selling cars before finally setting up his own gas cylinder business, from which he retired in the mid-1990s. He now lives in the Ribble Valley.
