= Tommy Sinclair (Scottish footballer) =

Scottish footballer

Personal information
- Full name: Thomas McKenzie Sinclair
- Place of birth: Shettleston, Scotland
- Position: Inside right

Senior career*
Years	Team	Apps	(Gls)
–1938	Shettleston		
1938–1939	Bolton Wanderers	10	(5)
- * Club domestic league appearances and goals

Thomas Sinclair was a Scottish professional footballer who played in the Football League for Bolton Wanderers as an inside right.

== Personal life ==
Sinclair served as a sergeant in 53rd (Bolton) Field Regiment, Royal Artillery, during the Second World War.
