= Tony Caldwell (footballer) =

English footballer (born 1958)

Personal information
- Full name: Anthony Caldwell
- Date of birth: 21 March 1958 (age 68)
- Place of birth: Salford, England
- Height: 5 ft 9 in (1.75 m)
- Position: Forward

Senior career*
Years	Team	Apps	(Gls)
1981–1982	Irlam Town	40	(29)
1982–1983	Horwich RMI	?	(?)
1983–1987	Bolton Wanderers	139	(58)
1987–1988	Bristol City	17	(3)
1987–1988	→ Chester City (loan)	4	(0)
1988	Grimsby Town	3	(0)
1988–1989	Stockport County	26	(6)
1989–1990	Chorley	19	(5)
- * Club domestic league appearances and goals

Anthony Caldwell (born 21 March 1958) is an English former professional footballer who played in the Football League as a forward.

== Honours ==
Bolton Wanderers

- Associate Members' Cup runner-up: 1985–86
