= Walter White (Scottish footballer) =

Scottish footballer

Personal information
- Full name: Walter White
- Date of birth: 15 May 1882
- Place of birth: Hurlford, Scotland
- Date of death: 8 July 1950 (aged 68)
- Place of death: Fulham, England
- Height: 5 ft 7 1/2 in (1.71 m)
- Positions: Inside forward; left half

Senior career*
Years	Team	Apps	(Gls)
1899–1900	Hurlford Britannia		
1900–1901	Portland Thistle		
1901–1902	Hurlford Thistle		
1902–1908	Bolton Wanderers	196	(88)
1908–1910	Everton	43	(10)
1910–1923	Fulham	191	(16)

International career
1907–1908	Scotland	2	(0)
- * Club domestic league appearances and goals

Walter White (15 May 1882 – 8 July 1950) was a Scottish professional footballer who played as an inside forward in the Football League for Bolton Wanderers, Fulham and Everton. He won two caps for Scotland at international level.

== Personal life ==
White was married with three children. He served as a gunner in the Royal Garrison Artillery during the First World War and was gassed in 1918.

== Career statistics ==
Appearances and goals by club, season and competition
Club	Season	League			FA Cup		Total	
Club	Season	Division	Apps	Goals	Apps	Goals	Apps	Goals
Everton	1908–09	First Division	18	3	2	1	20	4
Everton	1909–10	First Division	23	6	7	2	30	8
Everton	1910–11	First Division	2	1	—		2	1
Everton	Total		43	10	9	3	52	13
Fulham	1914–15	Second Division	33	4	2	0	35	4
Career total			76	14	11	3	87	17

== Honours ==
Bolton Wanderers

- Football League Second Division second-place promotion: 1904–05
