= Roy Greaves =

English footballer (1947–2024)

Personal information
- Date of birth: 4 April 1947
- Place of birth: Farnworth, England
- Date of death: 12 August 2024 (aged 77)
- Height: 5 ft 10 in (1.78 m)
- Positions: Striker; midfielder

Senior career*
Years	Team	Apps	(Gls)
1965–1980	Bolton Wanderers	495	(66)
1980–1982	Seattle Sounders	84	(4)
1982–1983	Seattle Sounders (indoor)	15	(3)
1982–1983	Rochdale	21	(0)
Total		615	(73)
- * Club domestic league appearances and goals

Roy Greaves (4 April 1947 – 12 August 2024) was an English footballer who made more than 500 appearances in the Football League playing for Bolton Wanderers, where he spent the vast majority of his career, and Rochdale, and in the North American Soccer League for the Seattle Sounders.

Greaves was born in Farnworth, near Bolton on 4 April 1947. He began his football career as a junior with Bolton Wanderers, playing as a striker, and scored twice in his league debut against Southampton in 1965. With the team struggling after the abolishment of the maximum wage he still managed to lead the side's goal scoring charts but was criticised as the club went into the Third Division for the first time.

When Jimmy Armfield took over as manager in the summer of 1971 he withdrew Greaves into a midfield role. Playing in this role he helped the team win the Third Division Championship in 1972–73 and eventually back into the top flight in 1977–78. Bolton's relegation two seasons later brought an end to Greaves' time at the club and he moved initially to the United States to play for Seattle Sounders before seeing out his career with a season at Rochdale. He then moved back to Bolton to run a pub.

Greaves died on 12 August 2024, at the age of 77.
