= Willie Moir =

Scottish footballer

Personal information
- Date of birth: 19 April 1922
- Place of birth: Bucksburn, Aberdeen, Scotland
- Date of death: 9 May 1988 (aged 66)
- Place of death: Bolton, England
- Position: Inside right

Senior career*
Years	Team	Apps	(Gls)
1945–1955	Bolton Wanderers	325	(118)
1955–1957	Stockport County	70	(26)
Total		395	(144)

International career
1950	Scotland	1	(0)
1952–1953	Scotland B	2	(0)
- * Club domestic league appearances and goals

William Moir (19 April 1922 – 9 May 1988) was a Scottish footballer who played for the majority of his career at Bolton Wanderers. He played mostly as an inside-right.

Born in Aberdeen, he signed for Bolton during the war years and made his professional league debut when regular league football restarted in 1946. Playing alongside Nat Lofthouse he was the Championship's top scorer in 1948–49 with 25 goals and continued good goal scoring form in the next few years, although always coming behind the more prolific Lofthouse.

Moir was captain when Bolton gave away a 3–1 lead to Blackpool in the Matthews Cup Final, scoring in the game. Two years later he left the club to join Stockport County where he spent a further two years as player manager before retiring from playing. He left Stockport County in 1960.

In 1950 Moir gained his sole cap for Scotland, with his selection for the important match against England in Glasgow which served both as the 1949–50 British Home Championship decider and a qualifier for the 1950 FIFA World Cup seen as a surprise in the local press; they also criticised his performance following the home side's 1–0 defeat. He made two further appearances for Scotland B.

He died in 1988 at the age of 66.

== Honours ==
Bolton Wanderers

- FA Cup runner-up: 1952–53
