= Ray Westwood =

English footballer

Raymond Westwood
Personal information
- Full name: Raymond William Westwood
- Date of birth: 14 April 1912
- Place of birth: Amblecote, England
- Date of death: 9 December 1981 (aged 69)
- Place of death: Stourbridge, England
- Height: 1.70 m (5 ft 7 in)
- Position: Inside forward

Senior career*
Years	Team	Apps	(Gls)
1927–1928	Stourbridge		
1928–1929	Bolton Wanderers	0	(0)
1929–1930	Brierley Hill Alliance		
1930–1947	Bolton Wanderers	301	(127)
1947–1949	Chester	38	(13)
1949–1951	Darwen		
Total		339	(140)

International career
1934–1937	Football League XI	5	
1934–1936	England	6	(0)
- * Club domestic league appearances and goals

Raymond William Westwood (14 April 1912 – 9 December 1981) was an English professional footballer who made over 300 appearances in the Football League for Bolton Wanderers as an inside forward. He was capped by England at international level and represented the Football League XI.

== Career ==
Born in Amblecote, Westwood played professionally for Bolton Wanderers and Chester and made career totals of 339 Football League appearances and 127 goals. He also played non-League football for Stourbridge, Brierley Hill Alliance and Darwen. He won six caps for England and represented the Football League XI.

== Personal life ==
Westwood was the nephew of footballer David Stokes, and was the cousin of footballer Duncan Edwards. He served in 53rd (Bolton) Field Regiment, Royal Artillery, during the Second World War.

== Honours ==
Bolton Wanderers

- Football League Second Division second-place promotion: 1934–35

England

- British Home Championship: 1934–35 (shared)
