= Nat Lofthouse =

English footballer (1925–2011)

Nat Lofthouse OBE

Personal information
- Full name: Nathaniel Lofthouse
- Date of birth: 27 August 1925
- Place of birth: Bolton, England
- Date of death: 15 January 2011 (aged 85)
- Place of death: Bolton, England
- Height: 5 ft 9 in (1.76 m)
- Position: Centre-forward

Youth career
- 1939–1946: Bolton Wanderers

Senior career*
Years	Team	Apps	(Gls)
1946–1960	Bolton Wanderers	452	(255)

International career
1950–1958	England	33	(30)

Managerial career
- 1968–1971: Bolton Wanderers
- 1985: Bolton Wanderers (caretaker)
- * Club domestic league appearances and goals

Nathaniel Lofthouse OBE (27 August 1925 – 15 January 2011) was an English professional footballer who played as a forward for Bolton Wanderers for his entire career. He won 33 caps for England between 1950 and 1958, scoring 30 goals, with one of the highest goals-per-game ratios of any England player.

== Playing career ==
Born in Bolton, Lancashire, in 1925, Lofthouse joined the town's main club on 4 September 1939 and made his debut in a wartime 5–1 win against local rivals Bury on 22 March 1941 when he scored two goals. It was then more than five years until he made his league debut for the club, but he eventually played against Chelsea on 31 August 1946, when he scored twice in a 4–3 defeat. Lofthouse would go on to play 33 games for England, but his debut on 22 November 1950 made him 25 when he finally broke into the team. He perhaps justified a claim to an earlier call-up by scoring both goals in a 2–2 draw against Yugoslavia at Highbury on his debut.

On 25 May 1952, Lofthouse earned the title 'Lion of Vienna' after scoring his second goal in England's 3–2 victory over Austria. In doing so he was elbowed in the face, tackled from behind, and finally brought down by the goalkeeper. Back from national team duty, he then scored six goals in a game for the Football League against the Irish League on 24 September 1952.

In 1952–53, he was named FWA Footballer of the Year. He scored a goal – but was on the losing side – in the famous 1953 FA Cup Final (aka 'The Matthews Final'), having previously scored in each round. That season he topped the First Division goalscoring charts with 30 goals. He featured in the 1954 World Cup side. Lofthouse scored twice against Belgium in a match that ended 4–4. Injured for the next match, in the quarter final game against Uruguay he equalized in the 16th minute, after receiving the ball in the 18-yard box.

On 3 May 1958, almost five years to the day after losing the 1953 final, Lofthouse captained Bolton in the 1958 FA Cup Final against Manchester United. There was a national wave of sympathy for United, who three months earlier had suffered grievously in the Munich air disaster. Bolton won the game 2–0 with Lofthouse scoring both goals, the second of which was highly controversial and remains a talking point to this day. Lofthouse went into a challenge with the United keeper Harry Gregg and barged him into the net to score. Shoulder charging the goalkeeper was a legitimate tactic at the time, but Lofthouse later admitted that his challenge was a foul.

On 26 November 1958, Lofthouse made his final England appearance, against Wales, at the age of 33, and he officially retired from the game in January 1960 because of an ankle injury, although his final league game was not until 17 December of that year, when he suffered a knee injury against Birmingham City. Lofthouse stands eighth in the list of English football's top division all time goalscorers.

== Coaching and managerial career ==
After retiring from playing football, Lofthouse became the assistant trainer at Burnden Park on 10 July 1961 and was then appointed chief coach at the club in 1967. In 1968, he spent a brief time as caretaker manager of the club and took over the job full-time on 18 December. Before becoming Bolton's chief scout, he became an administrative manager at Burnden. In 1978, he became the club's executive manager. In 1985, at the age of 60, Lofthouse became caretaker manager at the club again and became president in 1986.

=== Recognition ===
Lofthouse was the recipient of various honours after retiring from the game. On 2 December 1989, he was made a Freeman of Bolton. On 1 January 1994, he was appointed an OBE and on 18 January 1997, Bolton decided to name their East Stand at their new Reebok Stadium after him. On 24 August 2013, a statue was dedicated.

On 7 April 1993, he appeared as a special guest on the TV guest show This Is Your Life, in which the on-screen guests included Tom Finney and Harry Gregg, while others including Bobby Charlton, Gary Lineker and Ian Rush appeared on screen to pay tribute to Lofthouse as they were unable to appear alongside Lofthouse due to other commitments.

Tributes were paid to Lofthouse as he celebrated his 80th birthday, including a party at the Reebok. A campaign, backed by Gordon Taylor, the chief executive of the Professional Footballers' Association and former Bolton player, was started, aiming to get Lofthouse knighted. Nat Lofthouse was an Inaugural Inductee into the English Football Hall of Fame in 2002.

== Personal life ==
When he was a child, he attended Castle Hill School, in his hometown of Bolton. As he was already a Bolton Wanderers player having joined them in 1939, Lofthouse was conscripted in 1943 and worked in Mosley Common colliery as a Bevin Boy during World War II. He married Alma Foster in 1947 and they remained married until her death in 1985. They had two children, a son, Jeff, and a daughter, Vivien.

== Death ==
Lofthouse died on 15 January 2011, aged 85, in a nursing home in Bolton. He had suffered with dementia. On 24 January 2011 in Bolton Wanderers first home game since his death against Chelsea, a pre-match period of a minute's silence, thunderous applause, black-and-white footage of Lofthouse in action and the laying of floral tributes by Kevin Davies and John Terry took place before the start of the match. Lofthouse was buried on 26 January 2011 as thousands turned out to say goodbye at Bolton Parish Church. His funeral service was attended by more than 500 invited guests and members of the public. Eulogies were offered by Bolton chairman Phil Gartside and Professional Footballers' Association chief executive Gordon Taylor, a boyhood Bolton fan and former Wanderers player. Former Bolton captain Kevin Davies and then manager Owen Coyle were among the pallbearers.

== Legacy ==
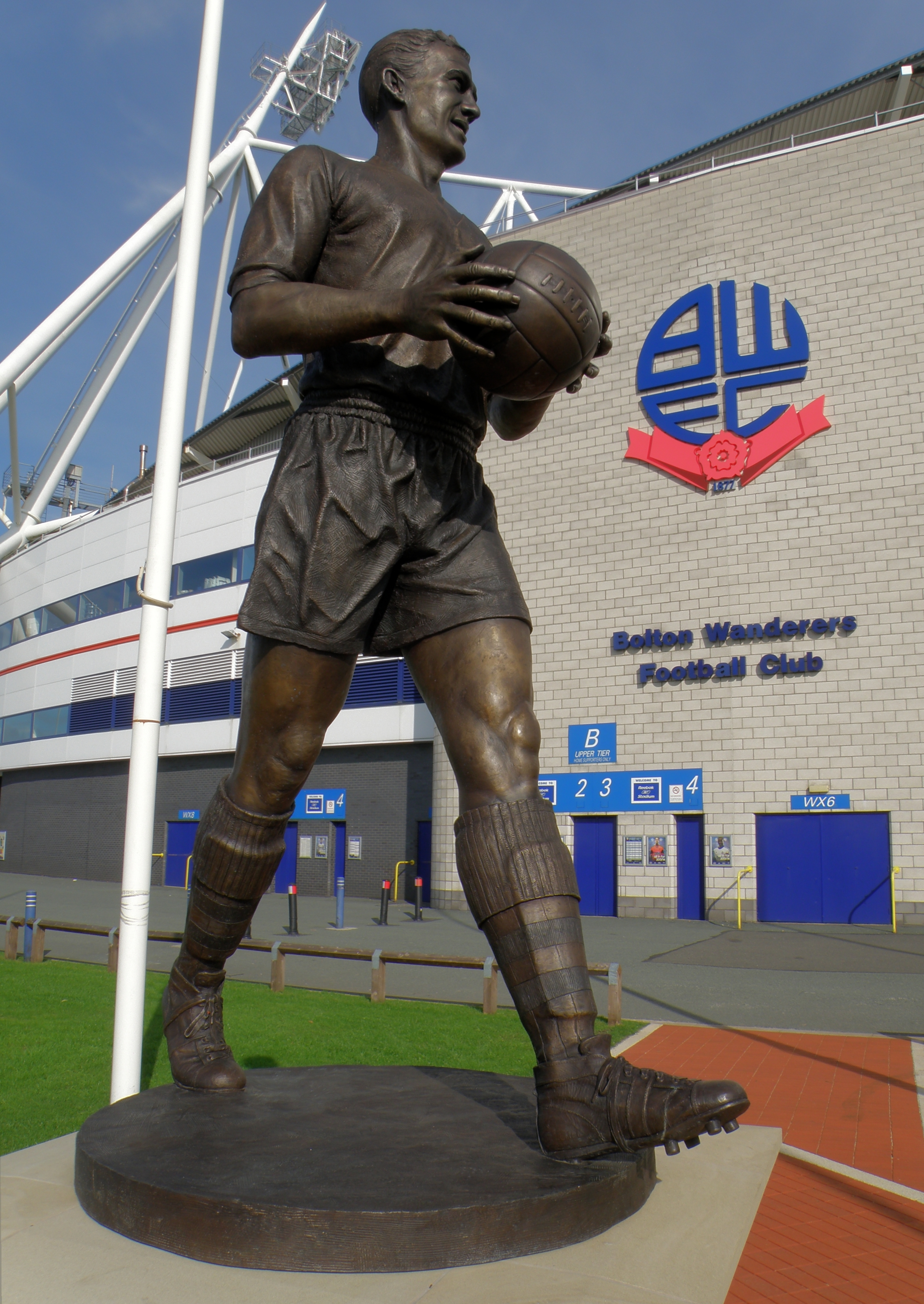
Lofthouse's statue outside the University of Bolton Stadium

Soon after Lofthouse's death a swell of support for a statue to be built in his memory started. A year to the day after his death, Bolton Wanderers chairman Phil Gartside announced plans for one to be built and for the statue to be situated outside the Reebok Stadium. The plan was for the statue to be funded by public donations, with help from the club. It was unveiled on 24 August 2013, three days before what would have been Lofthouse's 88th birthday. It was originally scheduled to take place three days later on his birthday but the date was moved forward to coincide with Bolton's home fixture against Queens Park Rangers.

In April 1998, train operator Virgin CrossCountry named locomotive 47807 Lion of Vienna in Lofthouse's honour at Bolton station.

== Career statistics ==
=== Club ===
Appearances and goals by club, season and competition
Club	Season	League			FA Cup		Charity Shield		Europe		Total	
Club	Season	Division	Apps	Goals	Apps	Goals	Apps	Goals	Apps	Goals	Apps	Goals
Bolton Wanderers	1946–47	First Division	40	17							40	17
Bolton Wanderers	1947–48	First Division	34	18							34	18
Bolton Wanderers	1948–49	First Division	22	7							22	7
Bolton Wanderers	1949–50	First Division	35	11							35	10
Bolton Wanderers	1950–51	First Division	38	21			1	1			39	22
Bolton Wanderers	1951–52	First Division	38	16							38	16
Bolton Wanderers	1952–53	First Division	36	22	2	2					38	24
Bolton Wanderers	1953–54	First Division	32	17							32	17
Bolton Wanderers	1954–55	First Division	31	15							31	15
Bolton Wanderers	1955–56	First Division	36	32	2	1					38	33
Bolton Wanderers	1956–57	First Division	36	28	1	0					37	28
Bolton Wanderers	1957–58	First Division	31	17	4	3					35	20
Bolton Wanderers	1958–59	First Division	37	29	5	3	1	2			43	34
Bolton Wanderers	1959–60	First Division	6	5							6	3
Career total			452	255	14	9	2	3			466	264

=== International goals ===
Scores and results list England's goal tally first, score column indicates score after each Lofthouse goal.

List of international goals scored by Nat Lofthouse
No.	Date	Venue	Opponent	Score	Result	Competition
1	22 November 1950	Highbury Stadium, London, England	Yugoslavia	1–0	2–2	Friendly
2	22 November 1950	Highbury Stadium, London, England	Yugoslavia	2–0	2–2	Friendly
3	14 November 1951	Villa Park, Birmingham, England	Northern Ireland	1–0	2–0	1951–52 British Home Championship
4	14 November 1951	Villa Park, Birmingham, England	Northern Ireland	2–0	2–0	1951–52 British Home Championship
5	28 November 1951	Wembley Stadium, London, England	Austria	2–1	2–2	Friendly
6	25 May 1952	Praterstadion, Vienna, Austria	Austria	1–0	3–2	Friendly
7	25 May 1952	Praterstadion, Vienna, Austria	Austria	3–2	3–2	Friendly
8	28 May 1952	Hardturm, Zürich, Switzerland	Switzerland	2–0	3–0	Friendly
9	28 May 1952	Hardturm, Zürich, Switzerland	Switzerland	3–0	3–0	Friendly
10	4 October 1952	Windsor Park, Belfast, Northern Ireland	Northern Ireland	1–0	2–2	1952–53 British Home Championship
11	12 November 1952	Wembley Stadium, London, England	Wales	2–0	5–2	1952–53 British Home Championship
12	12 November 1952	Wembley Stadium, London, England	Wales	5–2	5–2	1952–53 British Home Championship
13	24 November 1952	Wembley Stadium, London, England	Belgium	2–0	5–0	Friendly
14	24 November 1952	Wembley Stadium, London, England	Belgium	5–0	5–0	Friendly
15	24 May 1953	Estadio Nacional de Chile, Santiago, Chile	Chile	2–1	2–1	Friendly
16	8 June 1953	Yankee Stadium, New York, United States	United States	2–0	6–3	Friendly
17	8 June 1953	Yankee Stadium, New York, United States	United States	4–0	6–3	Friendly
18	10 October 1953	Ninian Park, Cardiff, Wales	Wales	3– 1	4–1	1954 FIFA World Cup qualification & 1953–54 British Home Championship
19	10 October 1953	Ninian Park, Cardiff, Wales	Wales	4–1	4–1	1954 FIFA World Cup qualification & 1953–54 British Home Championship
20	11 November 1953	Goodison Park, Liverpool, England	Northern Ireland	3–1	3–1	1954 FIFA World Cup qualification & 1953–54 British Home Championship
21	17 June 1954	St. Jakob Stadium, Basel, Switzerland	Belgium	2–1	4–4	1954 FIFA World Cup group stage
22	17 June 1954	St. Jakob Stadium, Basel, Switzerland	Belgium	4–3	4–4	1954 FIFA World Cup group stage
23	26 June 1954	St. Jakob Stadium, Basel, Switzerland	Uruguay	1–1	2–4	1954 FIFA World Cup quarter-final
24	2 April 1955	Wembley Stadium, London, England	Scotland	2–0	7–2	1954–55 British Home Championship
25	2 April 1955	Wembley Stadium, London, England	Scotland	4–1	7–2	1954–55 British Home Championship
26	2 October 1955	Københavns Idrætspark, Copenhagen, Denmark	Denmark	2–0	5–1	Friendly
27	2 October 1955	Københavns Idrætspark, Copenhagen, Denmark	Denmark	3–0	5–1	Friendly
28	20 May 1956	Helsinki Olympic Stadium, Helsinki, Finland	Finland	4–1	5–1	Friendly
29	20 May 1956	Helsinki Olympic Stadium, Helsinki, Finland	Finland	5–1	5–1	Friendly
30	22 October 1958	Wembley Stadium, London, England	Soviet Union	5–0	5–0	Friendly

== Honours ==
Bolton Wanderers

- Football League War Cup: 1944–45
- FA Cup: 1957–58; runner-up: 1952–53
- FA Charity Shield: 1958

England

- British Home Championship (outright): 1953–54, 1954–55
  - (shared) 1951–52, 1952–53, 1955–56, 1958–59

Individual

- FWA Footballer of the Year: 1952–53
- Football League First Division top scorer: 1955-56
- National Football Museum Hall of Fame Inductee (Inducted 2002)
