= Marsden Rock =

Rock formation in Tyne and Wear, United Kingdom

- Sea stack
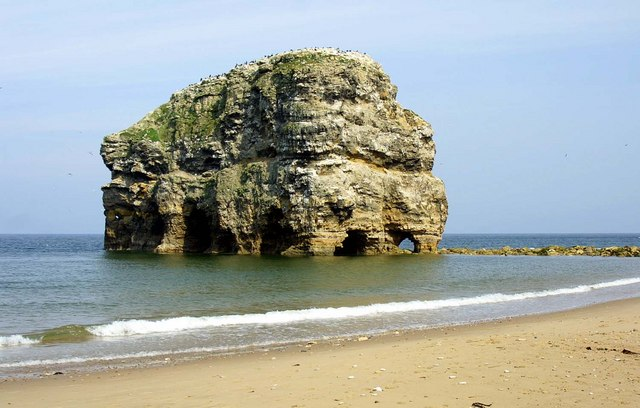
- Marsden Rock in 2006

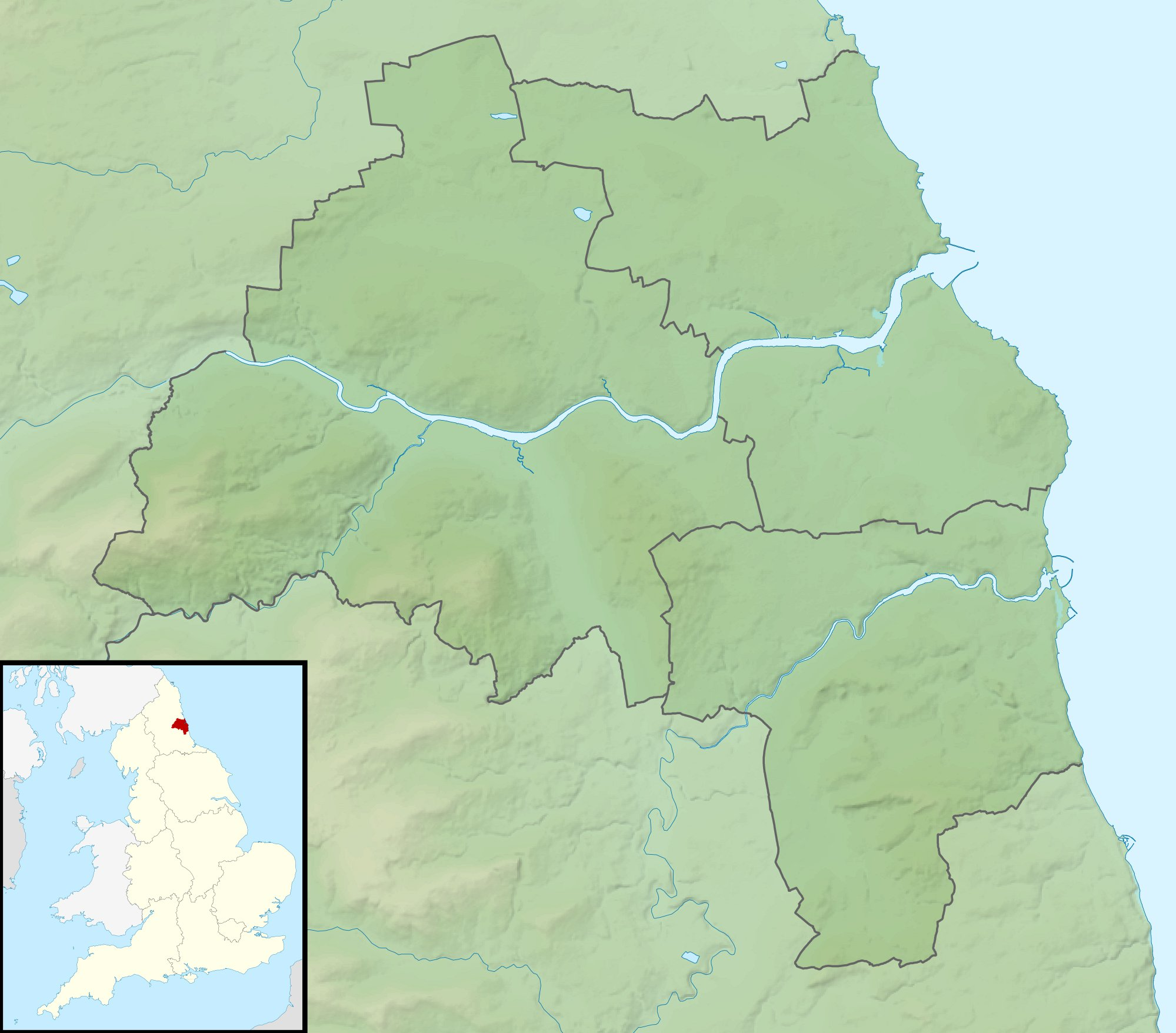
- Location in Tyne and Wear
- Coordinates: 54°58′39″N 01°22′31″W (Note: Coordinates from Ordnance Survey)
- Grid position: NZ 4008 6493
- Location: Tyne and Wear, North East England
- Geology: Magnesian Limestone

Marsden Rock is a rock in Tyne and Wear, North East England, situated in Marsden, South Shields. It is overlooked by the Marsden Grotto. The rock is a 90 feet (27 m) sea stack of Magnesian Limestone which lies approximately 300 feet (91 m) off the main cliff face. It was formerly known for its naturally-formed arch. The arch collapsed in 1996 following a winter of storms creating two separate stacks. The smaller of the two was demolished in 1997 due to safety concerns. The remaining stack is reachable on foot during low tide but is completely surrounded by water at high tide. The cliffs surrounding Marsden Rock are an important breeding ground for seabirds and colonies can often be seen on top of the rock itself, including kittiwakes, herring gulls, and razorbills.

== Geology ==
=== Creation ===
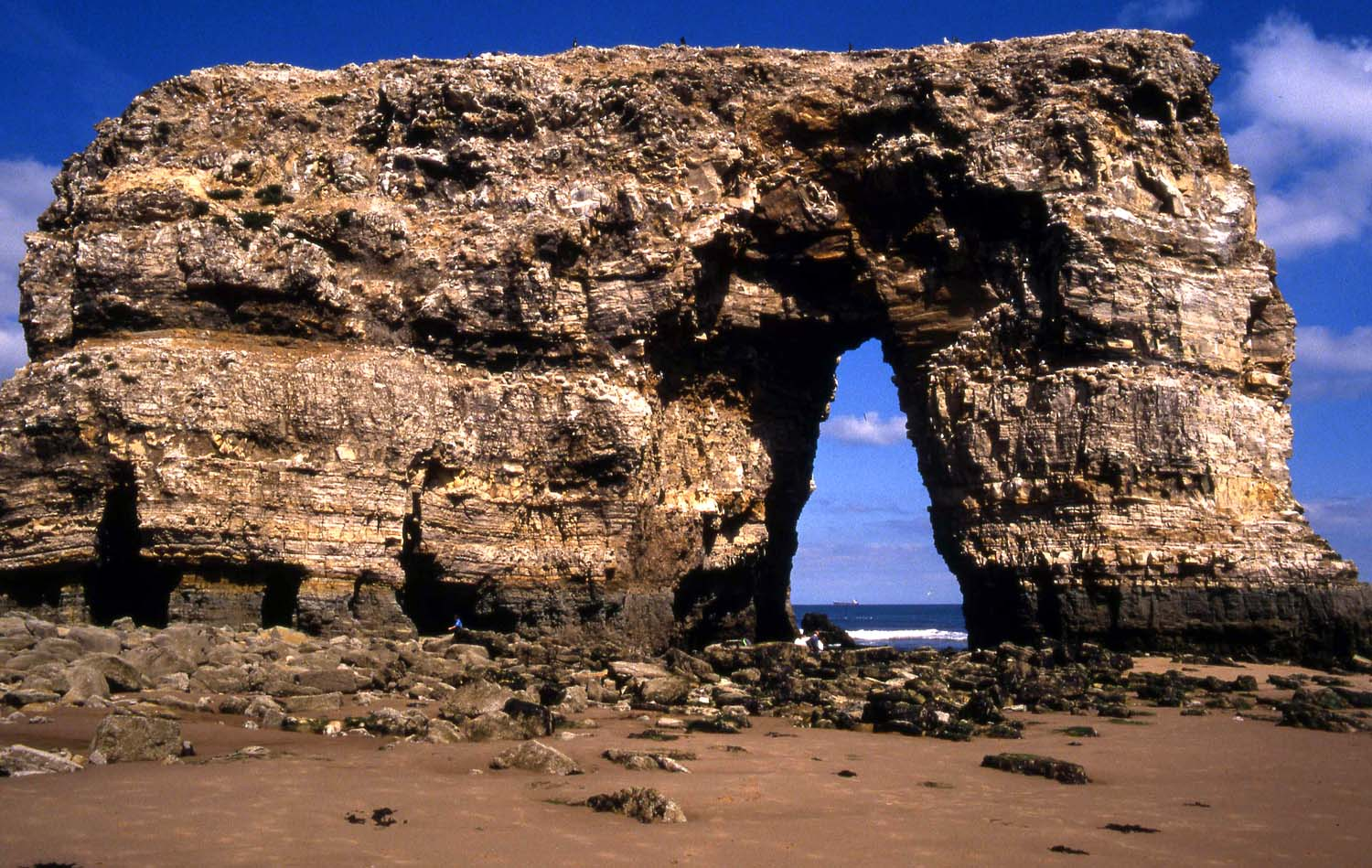
Marsden Rock in 1990. The arch was formed by erosion of the limestone rock by waves and weather.

During the Carboniferous Period, the Marsden coast was part of a continent and tropical swampland which stretched across the equator. Over time, the peat, sand and mud hardened to form the coal measures and the land drifted north of the equator. This land became a desert and subsequently lay below sea level, flooded around 260 million years ago by the Zechstein Sea which periodically rose and fell. The Permian Magnesian rocks found on Marsden coast were formed around 250 million years ago. The land continued to drift northwards over the next 250 million years until it reached its current position. The ice age which occurred around 15,000 years ago was largely responsible for shaping the current landscape of the Marsden coastline and surrounding area.

=== Erosion ===
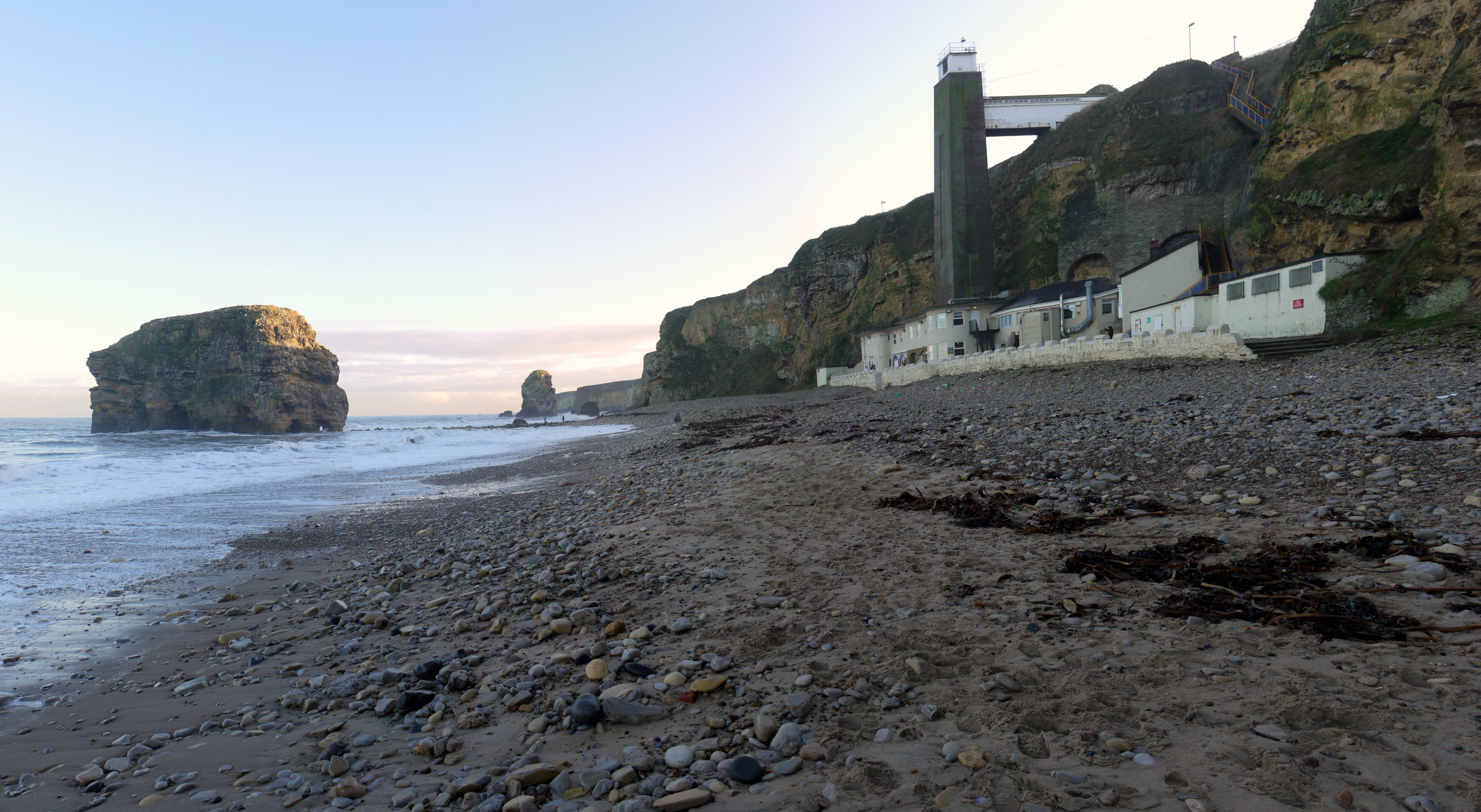
Marsden Rock (left) was once part of the main cliff, but became separated over time due to the erosion of less-resistant stone.

The Magnesian Limestone coast along Tyne and Wear is variable; some sections are firm and compact whilst other sections are brittle and easily disintegrated by the sea and weather. Marsden Rock was formed by erosion of less-resistant stone along the joints of the cliffs of Marsden Bay, resulting in an isolated stack of compacted limestone. A channel was carved through the rock by waves which formed a natural arch. By the 1800s, the arch had become large enough for sailing boats to pass through at high tide. Small caves have been carved into the rock over time which can be observed at low tide. Resistant beds, jutting out from the cliff and covered in vegetation, and promontories have also developed around the rock. The surrounding beach is composed of sand and gravel generated by shoreward drifting of sediment.

Marsden Rock has eroded and had various collapses throughout its history. In 1865, part of the rock gave way and five tons of rock fell through a building below. In early 1996 following a winter of storms, the top of the natural arch collapsed. This caused the rock to split into two separate stacks. The smaller of these two stacks, standing at 33 metres (108 ft), was inspected and deemed unstable and in danger of collapsing. It was demolished by the National Trust in 1997 in the interest of public safety. The remaining stack stands at 90 feet (27 m) high.

In 2018, it was reported that the materials forming the cliffs near Marsden Rock were weak and highly prone to fragmentation, with continued evidence of weathering. In 2020, the Rock itself was reported as "broadly stable", but local collapses of cave formations were still possible.

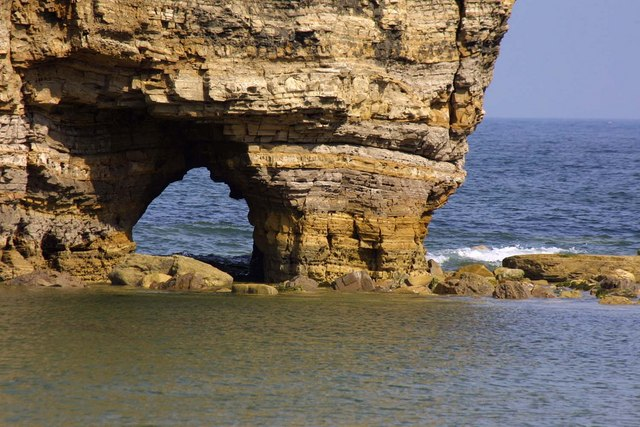
Picture taken in 2006 of a smaller arch which has been carved out of the remaining magnesian limestone stack.

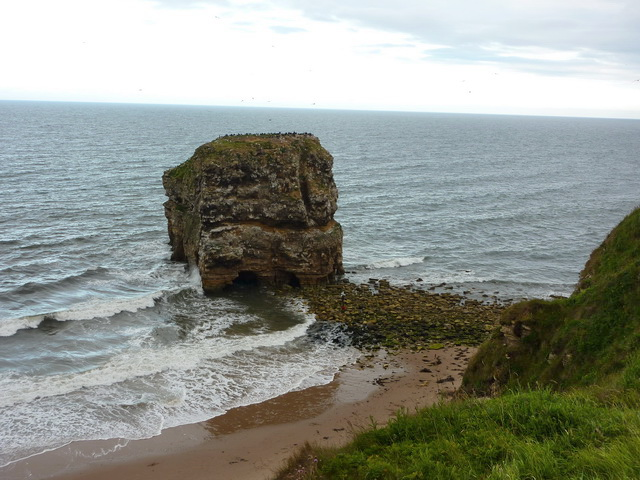
Marsden Rock in 2011, 14 years after the collapse of the arch and subsequent demolition of the smaller stack.

== Wildlife ==
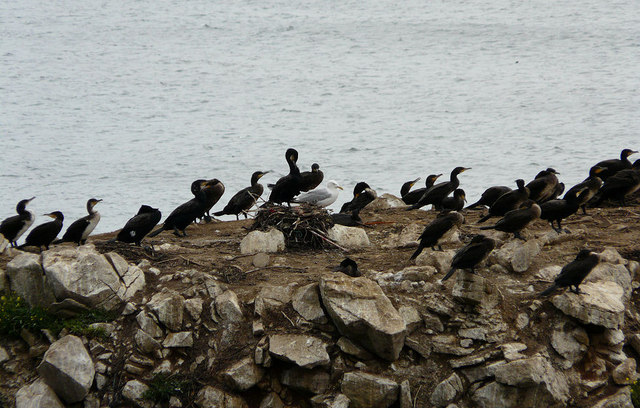
A group of seabirds, mainly cormorants, sitting on top of Marsden Rock.

The limestone cliffs which surround Marsden Rock are among the most important breeding colonies for seabirds in the north east of England. In the summer, the cliffs by Marsden Rock are home to fulmars, cormorants, kittiwakes, herring gulls, and razorbills. The rock itself is an important habitat for cormorants, which have been there since 1960 but have never been seen to breed. Puffin and guillemot fly past the area regularly and terns feed offshore. In the late autumn, migrant terns, skuas, and gannets can be seen on the rock. Peregrine falcons can occasionally be found in the winter along with Lapland bunting and snow bunting. In 1998, it was reported that Marsden Rock was the site of the only recorded breeding ground for Manx shearwater on the east coast on mainland Britain.

== Historical and cultural significance ==
Early 20th-century postcard of South Shields with Marsden Rock vignette at centre, one of many publications featuring the rock

Marsden Rock has long been a local tourist attraction and significant landmark due to its appearance and history. It is believed to have once been a location for smuggling brandy and tobacco, the surrounding high cliff-faces providing cover for the moor boats. The rock is also famous for its eccentric inhabitants: Jack the Blaster was a smuggler, poacher and miner who inhabited Marsden Bay in the 18th century with his wife. It was reported that Jack moved to Marsden Bay in 1780 when he was almost 80 years old after refusing to pay rent at his house in Allenheads. A subsequent inhabitant, Peter Allan, was a local eccentric tavern owner and builder who carved a home out of the rocks in Marsden Bay. In 1828, he moved in with his wife and family. By the late 19th century, the top of Marsden Rock was accessible by ladders and stairs which had been constructed by Peter Allan and his family. The excavations and access to picturesque views attracted the attention of holiday-makers. By 1887, it was reported that thousands of people had scaled the rock thanks to Allan's stairs. In 1903, a choir climbed onto the rock to perform a choral service. A contemporary news report recorded the event as "most inspiring to the listeners as they stood on the high cliffs of the mainland, and heard the great swell of choral praise floating over the wide waters and ascending to heaven."

The significance of Marsden Rock as a local landmark is evident in its various pictorial and artistic depictions. The rock has been featured on many postcards, photographs and paintings of the area. It is pictured on the Marsden Lodge Banner which represents the pitmen who worked in Whitburn Colliery alongside the phrase "Firm as a rock we stand". It has also appeared as a backdrop in the North-East drama Catherine Cookson.

Wood engravings of Marsden Rock

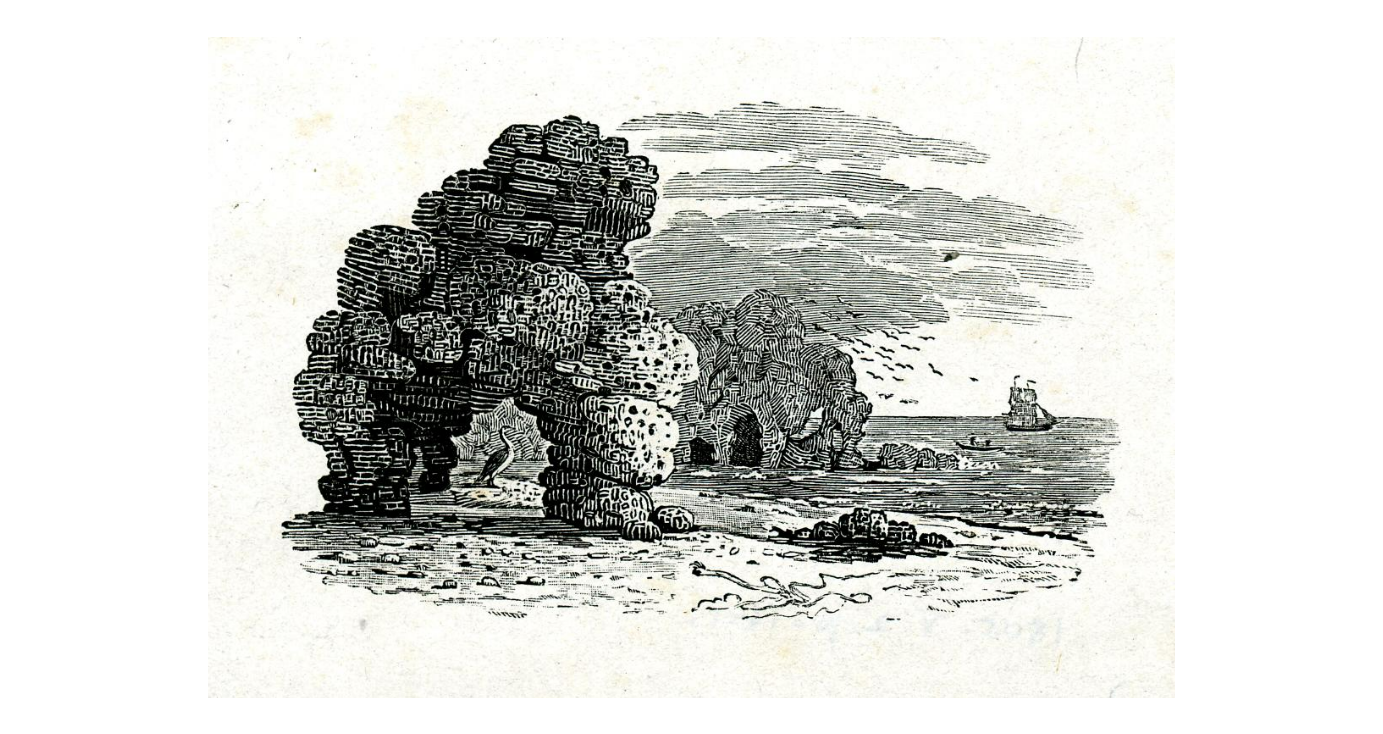
A wood engraving of Marsden Rock by Thomas Bewick, created in 1798 and published in A History of British Birds (1804).

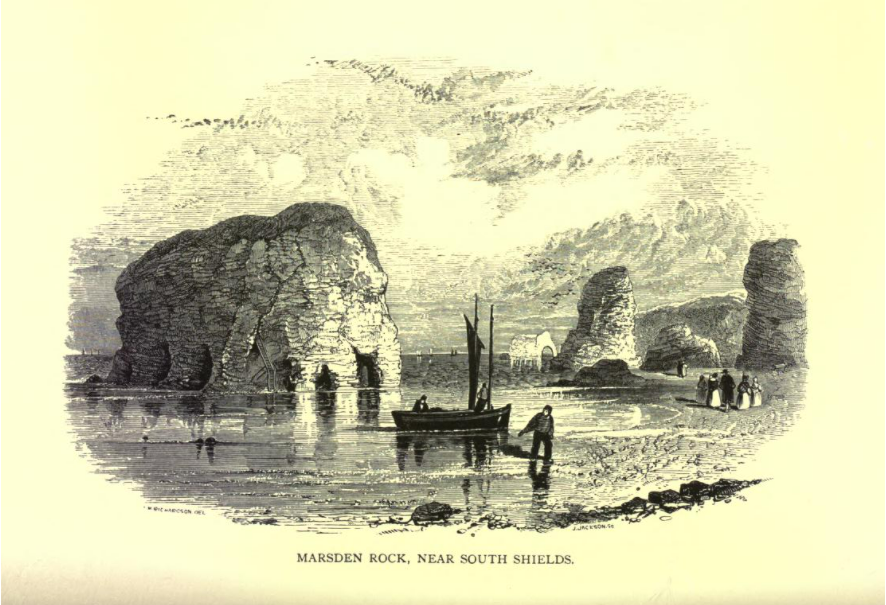
A wood engraving of Marsden Rock by John Jackson, created between 1816 and 1848.

There have been a number of songs and poems written about Marsden Rock. The Legend of Marsden Rock; or the life and adventures of Little Spottee, the hermit of the rock, is a four-part poem and ghost story written by John Young in 1800. A song about Marsden Rock, to the tune of Jockey to the Fair, was sung in the 19th century. John Lodge included a poem entitled Ode the Marsden Rock in his 1842 poetry collection – The Bard, and minor poems – dedicated to Prince Albert. The poem marvels in the physical qualities and surroundings of Marsden Rock.

Hail, giant rock! hail, fortress of the deep!
Grim fortress of this stern and rock-bound shore,
Around thy base a thousand billows sweep,
Around thy head a thousand tempests roar,
And still thou dost maintain thy sway for evermore.

— Excerpt from Ode to Marsden Rock, The Bard, and Minor Poems, ed. John Lodge
