= Marsden Grotto =

Gastropub partly dug into cliff face in Marsden, England

Coordinates: 54.977°N 1.37745°W

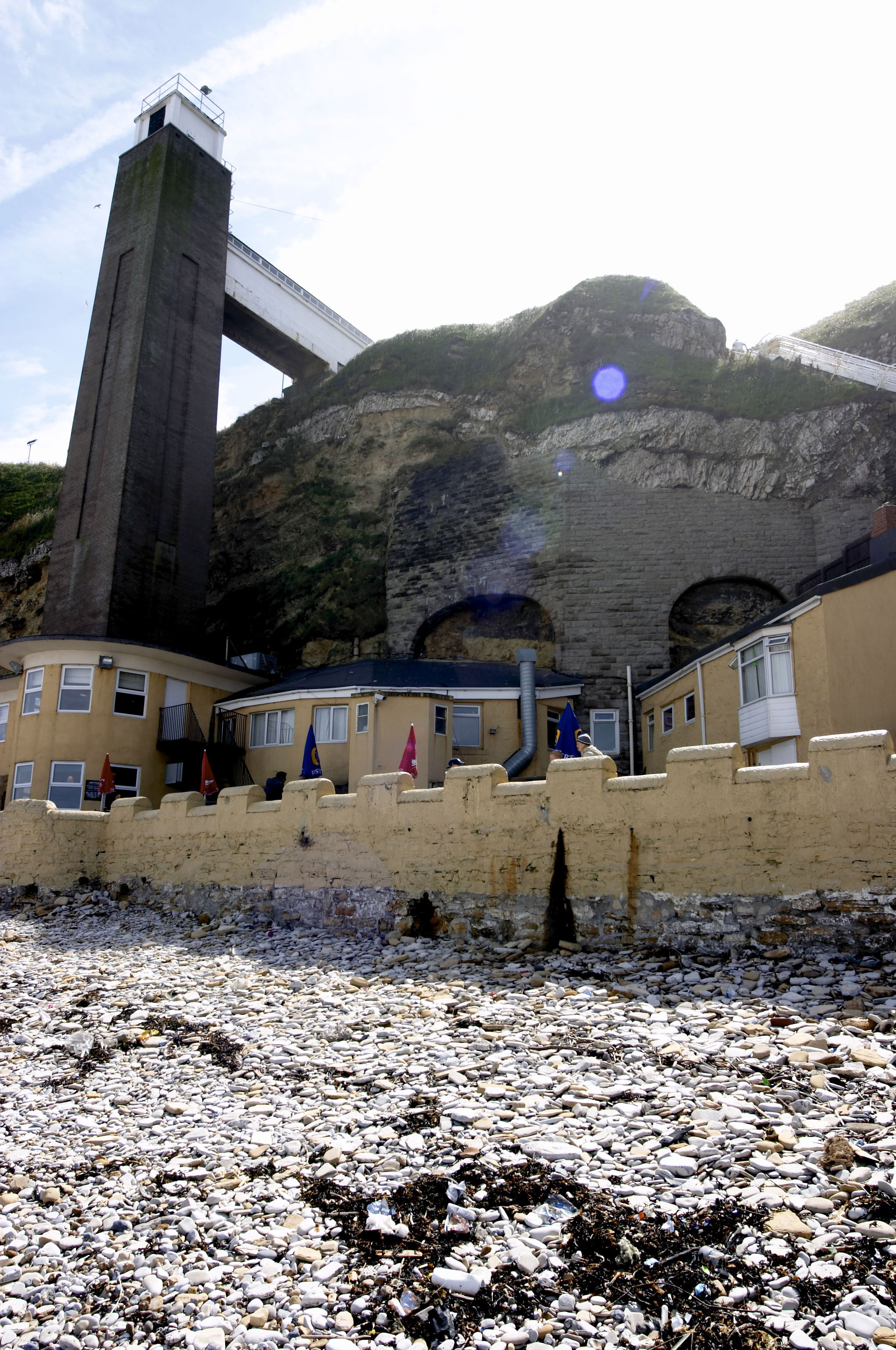
The Marsden Grotto from the beach, showing the lift shaft with the terrace bar below

The Marsden Grotto, locally known as The Grotto, is a gastropub located on the coast at Marsden in South Shields, Tyne & Wear, England. It is partly dug into the cliff face and fronted with a more conventional building opening onto the beach. The pub is one of the very few "cave bars" in Europe, another being Ye Olde Trip to Jerusalem in Nottingham.

The venue includes a large bar, the inside cave with another bar and pool room, a bistro, a heated terrace on the beach and a seafood restaurant upstairs. Access is either by lift from the car park or by a zigzag staircase on the cliff at the side of the building. The lift is housed in a brick shaft rising from the front of the building.

== History ==
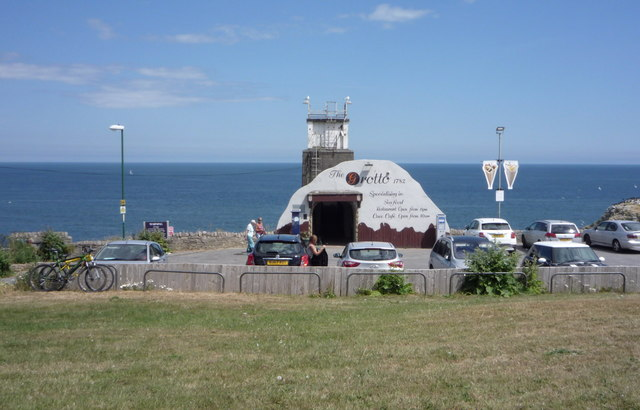
Street entrance leading to lift down

=== Jack the Blaster ===
A lead miner from Allendale, Jack Bates and his wife Jessie moved to the area in 1782. It is said that he moved into a small cave at Marsden Rock either after refusing to pay rent on his house in Allendale or simply having nowhere to live. Using explosives from a local quarry, he blasted the small cave into a much larger one, earning his nickname "Jack the Blaster" in the process and creating a rent-free and landlord-free home. The dwelling was accessed by zigzag stairs down the cliff, thought to be built by Jack Bates. The unusual and eccentric choice of dwelling attracted visitors, to whom the couple sold refreshments. He may have become involved in smuggling – offering refreshment to smugglers using caves of the coastline to hide contraband.

=== Peter Allan ===
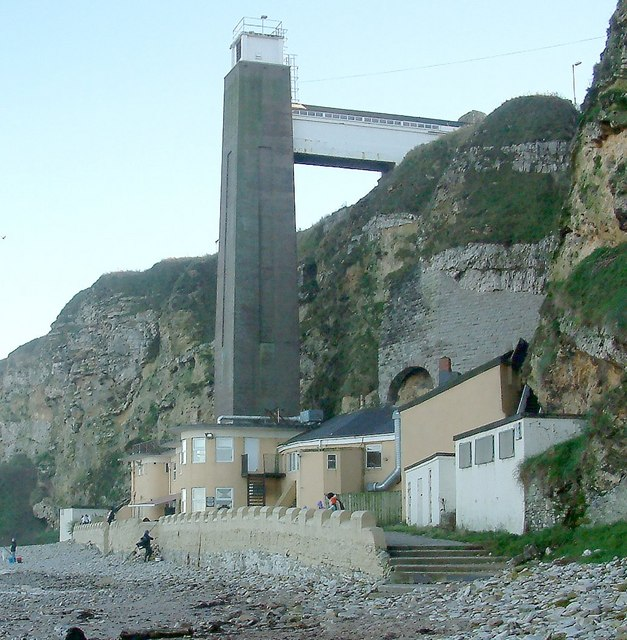
View at beach level

A local man (although originally from Scotland) and pub landlord, Peter Allan took over the Marsden Grotto and developed it with money supposedly won at the races. His father was the gamekeeper of Sir Hedworth Williamson. Allan restored and extended the caves into a 15-room home including a ballroom and kitchen, turning Jack's house into an inn.

In 1848 John Clay, who later became the first mayor of the County Borough of South Shields, bought The Leas and claimed that the land gave him rights to The Grotto. Allan battled with Clay in court and was forced to pay £50 costs and £10 annual rent for 20 years. Allan sank into depression and died in 1849 leaving his wife and eight children. Both his father and mother also survived him.

After Allan’s death his family continued to run The Grotto for another 35 years. In this time many improvements were made, along with further excavations implemented by Allan's children. A catastrophic cliff fall in 1865 almost destroyed the inn. Large retaining walls were built to protect the internal structure.

=== Harton Coal Company ===
The Harton Coal Company acquired The Grotto in the latter half of the 19th century. It had substantial success during this period, but it was also allowed to fall into disrepair.

=== Vaux Breweries ===
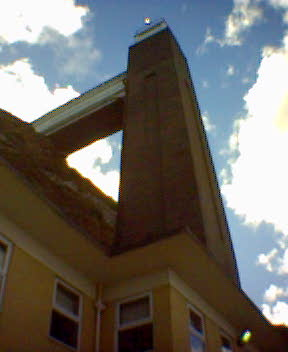
The Marsden Grotto lift shaft (from below)

Vaux took over The Grotto in 1898. They decided to clean the place up as it was littered with empty beer barrels that draymen would not collect. In 1938 Vaux purchased The Grotto and set upon a large refurbishment program. The buildings joined onto the caves were rebuilt to a high standard. A lift was also added to the surface.

In 1999 Vaux decided to concentrate more on their hotel and leisure business rather than operate as a brewery. A buyer could not be found for the Marsden Grotto and it closed down.

=== After Vaux ===
The Sunderland restaurant firm, Tavistock, purchased The Grotto in a poor condition. The premises were totally refurbished and The Grotto opened as a high class seafood restaurant and bar. Following its purchase of the Roker Hotel in Sunderland, Tavistock sold The Grotto to London Inns & Restaurants in 2003. The Grotto later passed to Oxford Hotels and Inns Management Ltd. In September 2007, South Tyneside Council, who are responsible for the stairs adjacent to the pub, closed them due to a damaged step, pending repair. Tyne and Wear Fire and Rescue Service ordered the pub to be temporarily closed to the public until the stairs reopened as they are the only means of safe evacuation from the pub, especially at high tide. The Grotto reopened on 21 March 2008.

== Ghosts ==
There have long been tales of hauntings at The Grotto, mainly relating to a smuggler named John the Jibber who was reputedly murdered by his fellow criminals after selling information to HM Customs. It is said that he was hung in a barrel in a cave close to the present lift shaft and left to starve. Until the pub was sold by Vaux, it was said that the landlord would leave out a special tankard of ale each night after closing and, in the morning, it would be empty. Local DJ and TV presenter Alan Robson drank from the tankard during one of his live Metro Radio shows, allegedly sparking off a series of supernatural phenomena that eventually forced the then landlord to quit. This allegedly included flying ashtrays smashing against the wall and flooding in the cellar after all the beer taps were inexplicably turned on.

The original tankard was lost during refurbishment. A replacement is on display, but is no longer filled up each night for the ghost. The pub was also the venue for a UKTV investigation in 2001, where paranormal researchers claimed, without evidence, to have identified at least seven different ghosts.

== In fiction ==
The novel Schoolfrenz by Ray Crowther is set mainly on Tyneside. The Marsden Grotto is mentioned several times and is the location for the climax of the book. The author's website contains an extract from Schoolfrenz about Marsden Grotto, and has additional photographs of the Grotto and the surrounding area.
