= Whitburn Colliery =

Coordinates: 54.978°N 1.3766°W

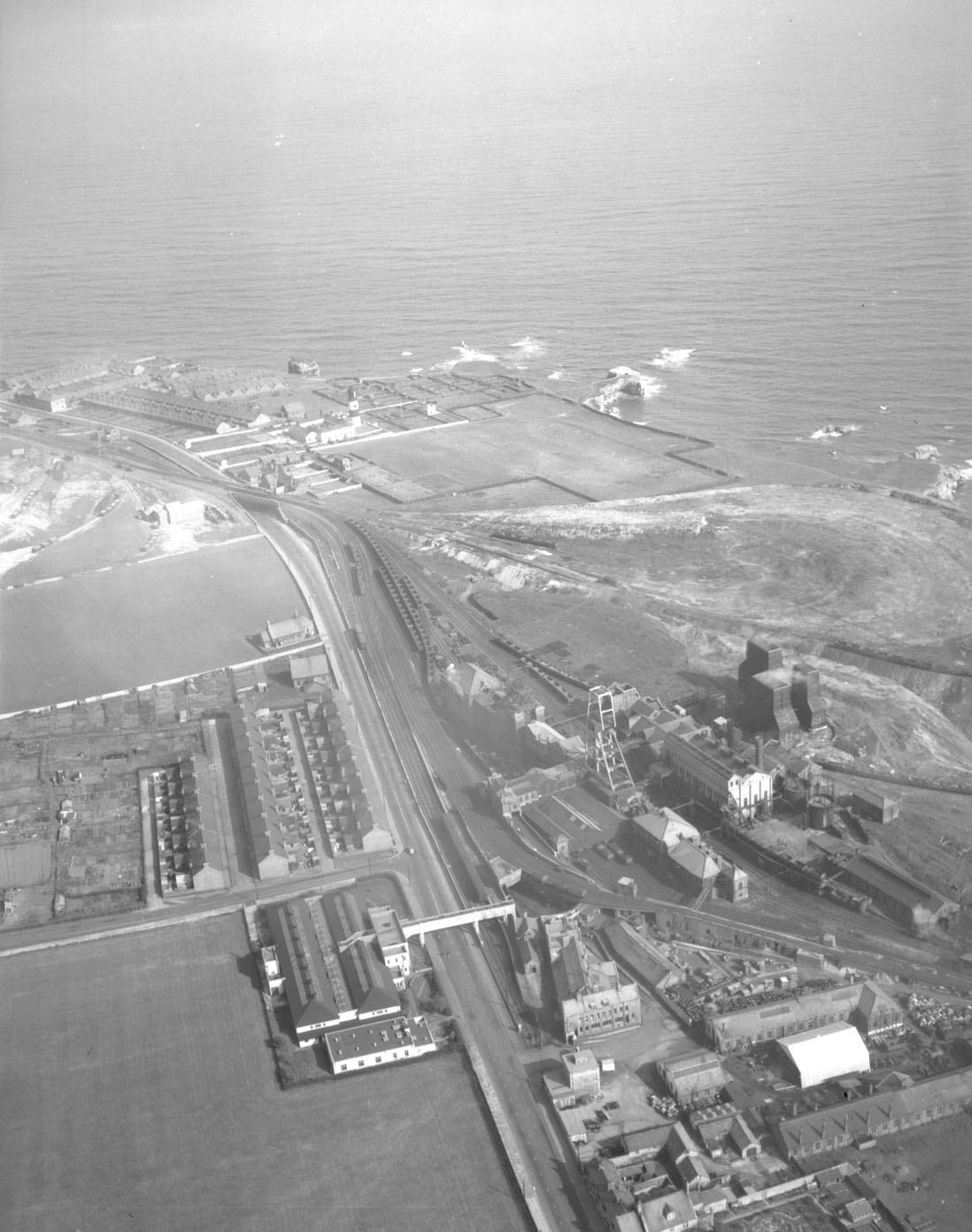
Whitburn Colliery: aerial view with Souter Lighthouse and Marsden Village beyond it to the north.

Whitburn Colliery was a coal mine located about three miles south of South Shields, North East England, located on the North Sea coast.

== Background ==
Marsden was originally a small village, consisting of farms, a few cottages and a lighthouse at Souter Point. Local industry consisted of a small limestone quarry.

== Development ==
In the 1870s, the Whitburn Coal Company bought the five quarries, two of which were developed as the Lighthouse (Marsden) Quarries.

On 14 July 1874 the company began sinking the Whitburn winnings, a bore-hole put down below the Brockwell Seam. However, the company failed to find any coal, and was faced with large amounts of water ingress from the North Sea.

In 1877, a new shaft was developed using the Kind-Chaudron process, its first deployment in the UK coal industry. The section through the water-fissured strata is lined with iron tubing, although throughout its life the electric pumps were required to extract 12,000 imperial gallons (55,000 L; 14,000 US gal) per day. Both shafts had a diameter of 13 feet (4.0 m), with No.1 shaft having a depth of 180 fathoms (1,080 ft; 330 m), and No.2 with a depth of 115 fathoms (690 ft; 210 m), to enable access to the Bensham seam, with thicknesses between 4 feet (1.2 m) to 6 feet 6 inches (1.98 m).

== Marsden village ==
The industrial development of the area required additional workers. The company built a new Marsden village, located between the Lighthouse Quarries and Whitburn Colliery. Designed to house 700+ people, there were: 135 houses; nine streets; a church and a Methodist chapel; co-op store; post office; school; and a Miners Institute. Located directly on the cliff top, resulting in an exposed and often weather-beaten experience, many wives refused to move to the village, meaning that most miners lived in South Shields and commuted daily using the newly constructed railway.

== Operation ==
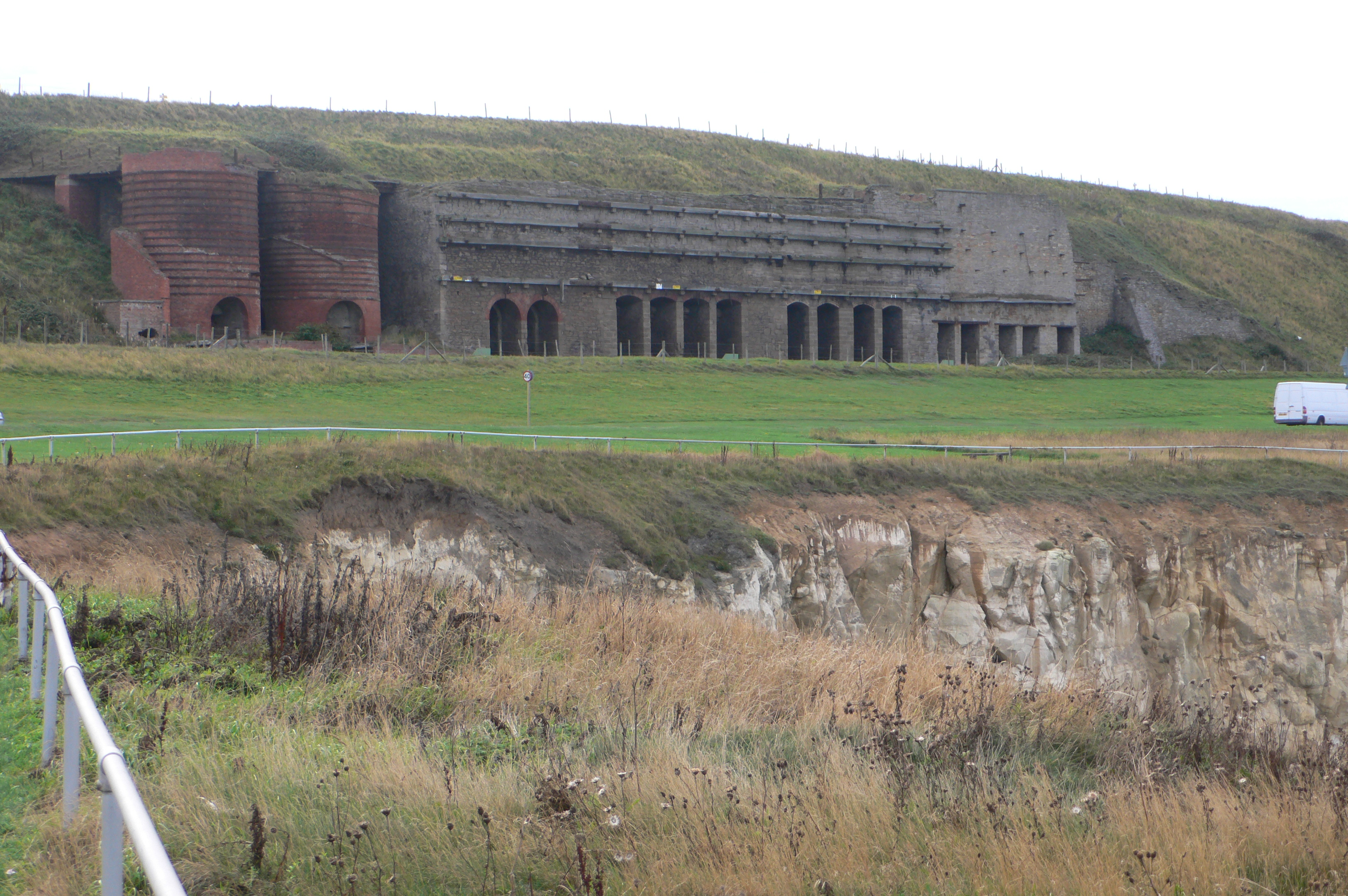
The residual structure of the Marsden lime kilns

The company built the twin-track South Shields, Marsden, and Whitburn Colliery Railway, leaving the North Eastern Railway line at Westoe Lane, South Shields and travelling to Marsden via two intermediate stations. Built to serve the colliery and opened in May 1879, the line served the Lighthouse limestone quarry, a paper manufactory, and local farms. On 19 March 1888 the line opened to the public.

The railway allowed colliery output to quickly rise to 1,500 tonnes (1,700 tons), employing 1,600 workers. Coal from the colliery initially fueled the lime kilns, which closed at the same time as the mines.

In 1891, the Whitburn Coal Company was bought by the Harton Coal Company, and by 1921 the system employed over 3,500 men. The company shut Marsden railway station in 1926, due to a lack of traffic and its proximity to the alternate station located within the colliery. On 16 May 1934 the developed Five Quarter seam was abandoned.

By the time of nationalisation in 1945 into the National Coal Board, the site employed just under 1,500 miners. The railway line itself became the first nationalised passenger line on 1 January 1947. The service for miners was replaced by bus from 16 November 1953, but public trains remained running until withdrawn with effect from Monday 23 November.

== Closure ==
Due to higher levels of water ingress as the mine shafts were developed under the North Sea, and resultant higher costs of operation and coal extraction, it was decided to close the mine in the mid-1960s. The final shift came up from shaft bottom on 8 June 1968.

With the closure of the mine, it was decided to demolish the village, due to coastal erosion and the economic need to heavily invest in the village to bring it up to modern living and sanitation standards. What remains are five rows of Victorian terraced houses, the small chapel and a primary school, although this is technically now located in Whitburn.

Parts of the northern section of the railway line (South Shields) survived the colliery's closure but it also closed and lifted in 1993 with the closure of Westoe Colliery.
