= Peter Allan (landlord) =

English recluse and eccentric (1799–1849)

Peter Allan (6 September 1799 – 31 August 1849) was an English eccentric, a publican who carved rocks in the Marsden Bay at Marsden, South Shields into an inn as well as a home.

== Early life ==
Born to Peter Allan, a shoemaker in Gladsmuir and Jane Rennie, who was the daughter of Archibald Kenley of Tranent, Allan grew up in Whitburn from the age of 3 or 4, after his father took the post of gamekeeper to Sir Hedworth Williamson. As a young man, Allan Jr was initially a valet to William Williamson and a gamekeeper for the Marquess of Londonderry. He later took over his father-in-law's pub, The Ship, in the village of Whitburn on the Durham coast. His wife was Elizabeth Collie.

== Marsden ==
After becoming infatuated with and working at the quarries near his property, and on the North Dock in Monkwearmouth, he decided to turn a limestone cliff in Marsden Bay into an actual house and inn. He blew out fifteen rooms, setting up a tavern on the beach (The Grotto) at the bottom of the cliff. In doing so, he followed the example of an old man, Jack Bates, who had previously (1780s) attracted custom to a cliff cave about a hundred yards to the south.

It is falsely alleged that "he mostly remained with his wife and children in the rock and did not often visit the surrounding town". As is shown by contemporary newspapers like the Sunderland Herald, he was a well-known and eccentric presence on the streets of Sunderland and South Shields, wheeling and dealing, sometimes winding up in court as a result. He also rescued a number of people from the sea, including a group of children in danger of drowning. Between 1846 and 1849, the new owners of the copyhold, Andrew Stoddart and John Clay, with the financial backing of Cuthbert Ellison, attempted to eject him, having bought out all the claimants to the land above the Grotto. (They are sometimes wrongly described as "lords of the manor" - the titular lord was the Bishop of Durham, who had supported the Grotto.) Allan's lawyer, Daniel Stack, managed only a compromise in the lawsuit that followed, maintaining Allan's right to live at the Grotto for an annual rent, but Allan died on 31 August 1849, perhaps affected by the stress. The Grotto, which was a sort of public attraction, was closed for a while by a collapse of the cliff in February 1865. It reopened, as popular as ever. The Grotto is still open, and is a pub and a hotel.

== Controversy ==
Some have mistakenly accepted Allan's designation as a "hermit" literally, when it was an ironic nickname, based on Scott's novels and the like. Allan was marooned there for a few weeks in a cold winter, but he was a very clubbable man, who loved company. Alan Robinson wrote a book in the 1970s denying the notion that Allan was a hermit, and this is confirmed by Bill Greenwell's research in 2021.
