= South Shields, Marsden, and Whitburn Colliery Railway =

Overview
- Locale: County Durham

Technical
- Track gauge: 4 ft 8 1/2 in (1,435 mm)

The South Shields, Marsden, and Whitburn Colliery Railway was a Whitburn Coal Company built twin track branch railway line that ran along the North Sea coast in County Durham, England, from Westoe Lane in South Shields to Whitburn Colliery at Marsden via two intermediate stations, Whitburn Colliery station (renamed Marsden in 1926), and Marsden (which closed in 1926).

== History ==
=== Opening ===
The line was built in the late 1870s without an Act of Parliament to serve the newly constructed Whitburn Colliery and was opened as a private railway in May 1879. Apart from the colliery and those working there the line served the Lighthouse limestone quarry, a paper manufactory, and local farms. The line opened to the public on 19 March 1888.

=== Nationalisation ===
On 1 January 1947 the coal company was vested in the National Coal Board so the railway became the first nationalised passenger line in Britain. (Most of the railways in Britain were nationalised on 1 January 1948 under the terms of the Transport Act 1947).

=== Closure ===
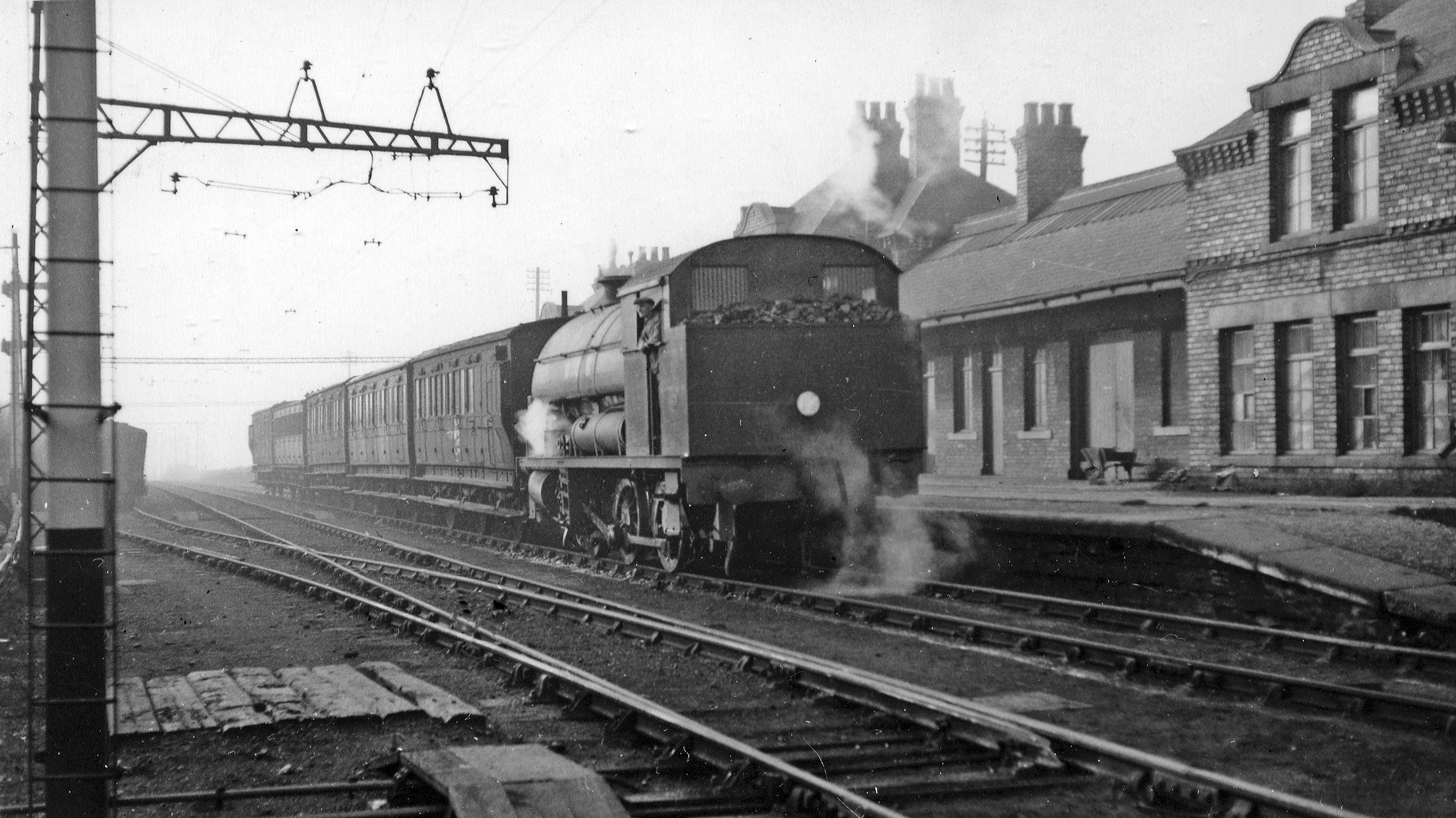
Westoe Lane station, South Shields, Marsden & Whitburn Colliery Railway on Last Day, 1953

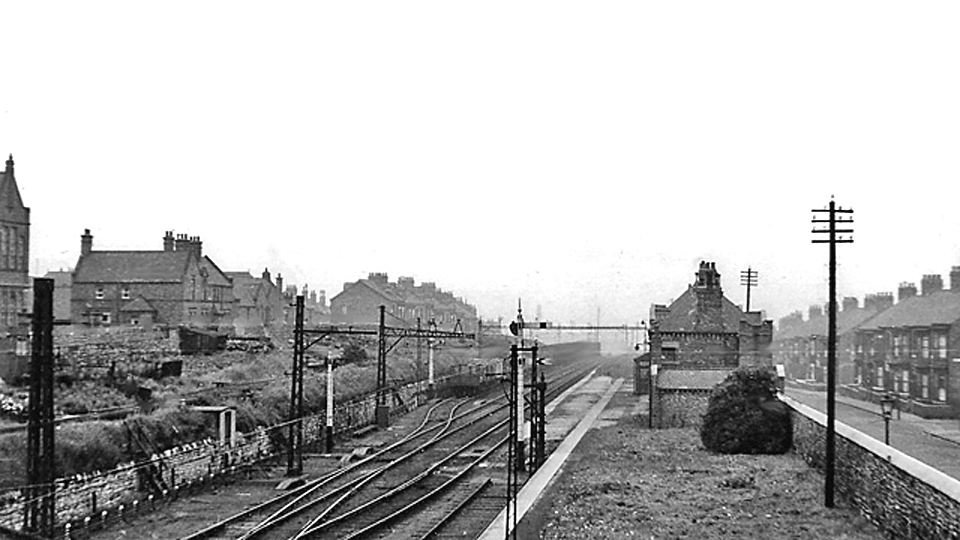
Westoe Lane (South Shields) Station in 1953

Passenger service was officially withdrawn on 14 November 1953, but trains ran until 23 November. The majority of the line closed to freight with the Whitburn Colliery on 8 June 1968 although the section running through Westoe Lane to Westoe Colliery remained open until 1993.
