= Marsden, Tyne and Wear =

Coordinates: 54.978°N 1.3766°W

Marsden
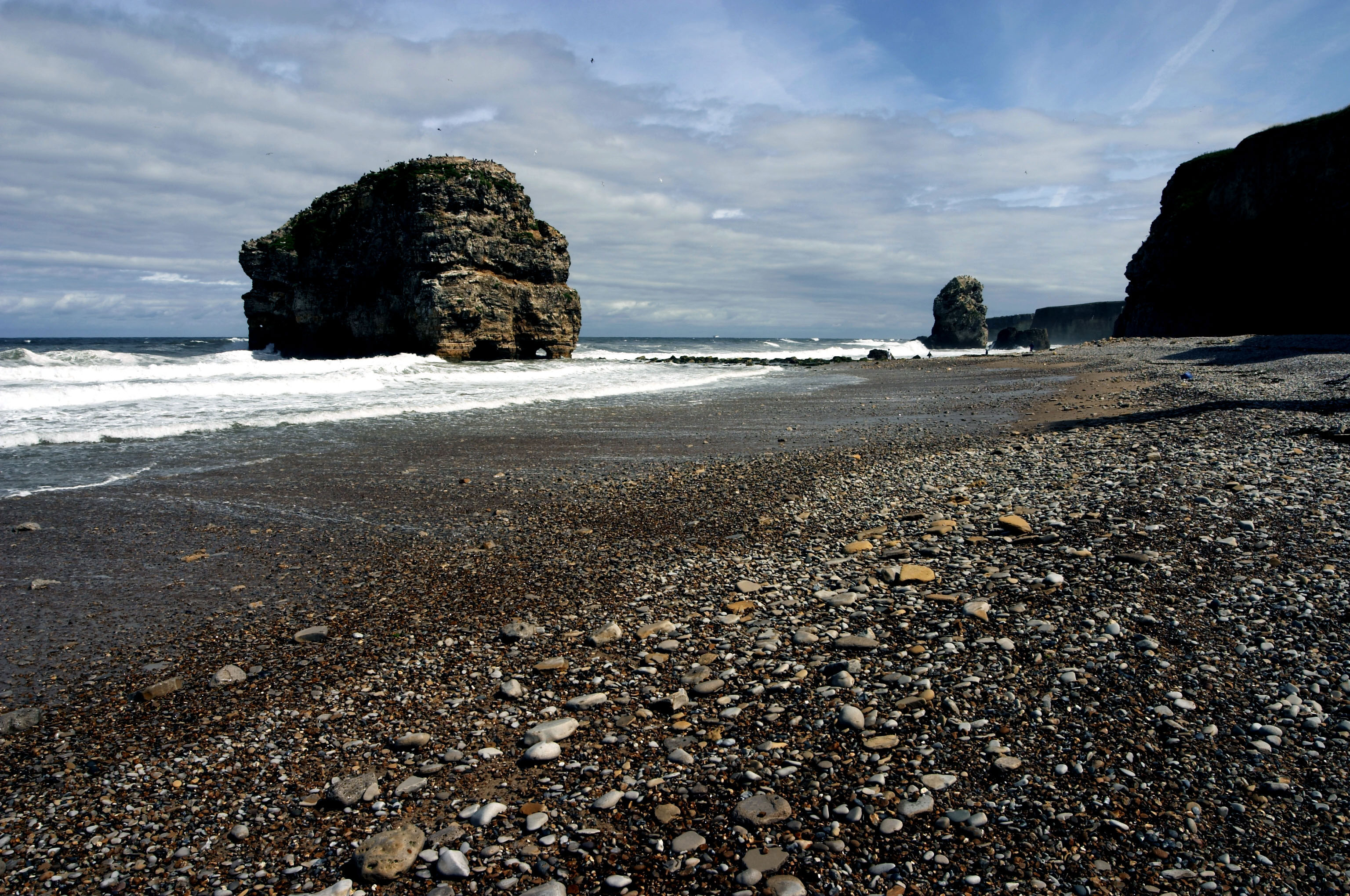
- Marsden Bay, looking south east towards Souter Lighthouse, Marsden Rock is on the left

- Location within Tyne and Wear
- OS grid reference: NZ395650
- Metropolitan borough: South Tyneside
- Metropolitan county: Tyne and Wear
- Region: North East
- Country: England
- Sovereign state: United Kingdom
- Post town: SOUTH SHIELDS
- Postcode district: NE34
- Dialling code: 0191
- Police: Northumbria
- Fire: Tyne and Wear
- Ambulance: North East
- UK Parliament: South Shields

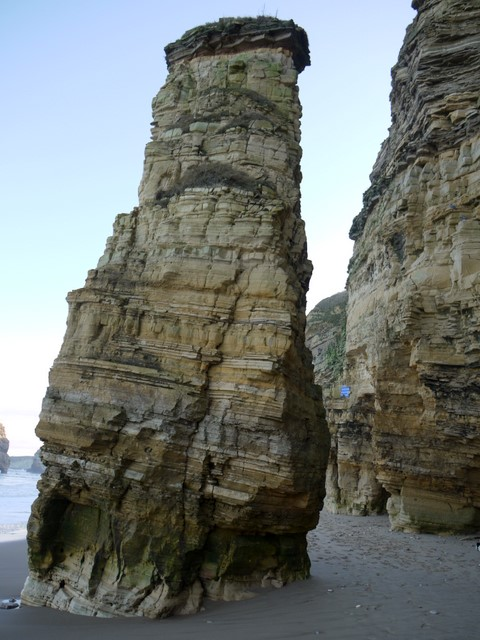
The Lot's wife sea-stack, Marsden Bay, in N.E.England.

Marsden, historically Marsdon, is located on the outskirts of the seaside town South Shields, North East England, located on the North Sea coast. It lies within historic County Durham.

== Background ==
Marsden was originally a small village, consisting of farms, a few cottages and a lighthouse at Souter Point. Local industry consisted of a small limestone quarry.

The nearby Marsden Bay includes the Marsden Rock sea stack. The Leas, located to the north, is an important seabird sanctuary. This land, along with Souter Lighthouse (the first lighthouse in the world to be powered by alternating current), is now owned by the National Trust. Marsden is best known for its beaches including Marsden Beach, with the famous Marsden Rock and pub, the Marsden Grotto. The beaches stretch along to the beach known locally as Boatie's Bay.

== Whitburn Colliery ==
In the 1870s, the Whitburn Coal Company bought the five local quarries, two of which were developed as the Lighthouse (Marsden) Quarries. An attempt to develop a shaft into the Northumberland Coalfield failed in 1874 because of water ingress, but in 1877 a second development using the Kind-Chaudron process, created access to the Bensham seam through two 13 feet (4.0 m) diameter shafts. No.1 shaft had a depth of 180 fathoms (1,080 ft; 330 m) and No.2, a depth of 115 fathoms (690 ft; 210 m).

The company built the twin-track South Shields, Marsden, and Whitburn Colliery Railway, leaving the North Eastern Railway line at Westoe Lane, South Shields and travelling to Marsden via two intermediate stations. Built to serve the colliery and opened in May 1879, the line served the Lighthouse limestone quarry, a paper manufactory, and local farms. On 19 March 1888, the line opened to the public.

== Marsden village ==
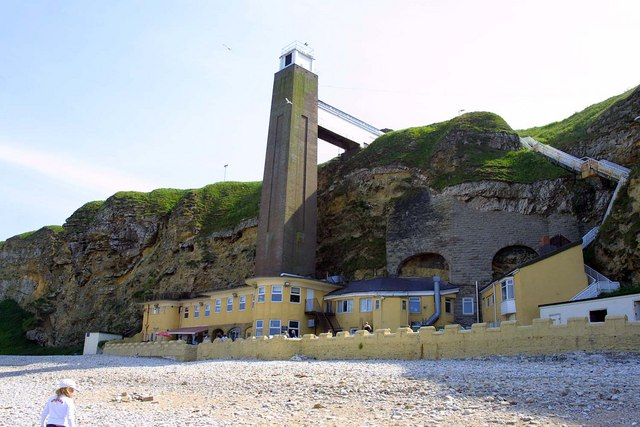
Marsden Grotto at the foot of the cliff (accessed via the lift tower).

The industrial development of the area required additional workers. The company built a new Marsden village, located between the Lighthouse Quarries and Whitburn Colliery. Designed to house more than 700 people, there were 135 houses across nine streets, a church and Methodist chapel, Co-op store, Post Office, school, and a Miners Institute. Located directly on the cliff top, resulting in an exposed and often weather-beaten experience, many wives refused to move to the village, meaning that most miners lived in South Shields and commuted daily using the newly constructed railway.

The village gave its name to the "Marsden Rattler", a passenger train which ran on the railway via the North Eastern Railway main line to South Shields.

By the time of nationalisation in 1945 into the National Coal Board, the site employed just under 1,500 miners. The railway line itself became the first nationalised passenger line on 1 January 1947. Passenger service was officially withdrawn on 14 November 1953, but trains ran until 23 November.

Marsden has two pubs, the Marsden Grotto and the Marsden Inn. The Inn is located on Marsden Lane while the Grotto is hewn in the cliffs facing Marsden Rock. There are a few shops including a reptile shop and several post offices up towards Cleadon Hills. Marsden Lane is the main street leading up to Lizard Lane, Marsden Lane begins at the bottom of Horsley Hill Square before stretching up.
