= The Leas =

Coordinates: 54.986°N 1.390°W

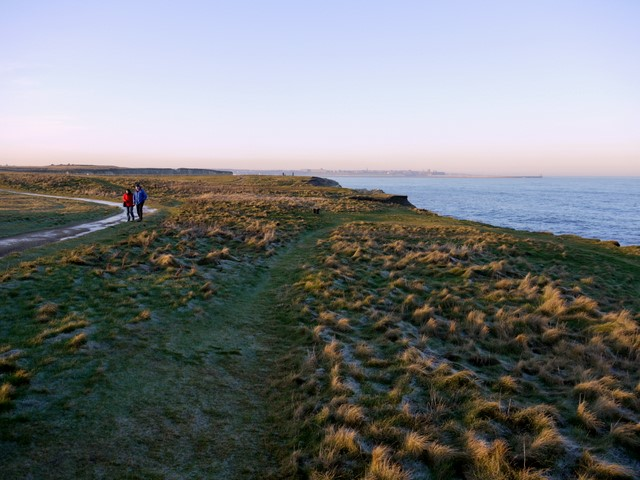
The Leas grassland east of Frenchman's Bay

The Leas is a large area of land owned and maintained by the National Trust along the coastal cliffs of South Shields, England.

It is popular with dog walkers, joggers, kite flyers, horse riders, cyclists and other activities. It is the finishing line for the Great North Run which is a half marathon that takes place every year in or around October and the venue for the Great North Dog Walk.

The Leas stretches for around 2 miles and goes as far as Souter Lighthouse on the way to Whitburn.
