= 1966–67 Brentford F.C. season =

English football team season

Brentford
1966–67 season
- Chairman: Jack Dunnett (until 24 February 1967); Ron Blindell (from 24 February 1967)
- Manager: Billy Gray (until March 1967); Jimmy Sirrel (from March 1967)
- Stadium: Griffin Park
- Fourth Division: 9th
- FA Cup: Third round
- League Cup: Second round
- Top goalscorer: League: Docherty (13); All: Docherty (19)
- Highest home attendance: 10,650
- Lowest home attendance: 3,600
- Average home league attendance: 6,727
Home colours

During the 1966–67 English football season, Brentford competed in the Football League Fourth Division. In a season overshadowed by the events of 19 January 1967, a promotion charge was derailed by five defeats in the final six matches of the campaign.

== Season summary ==
In a bid to buy Brentford out of the bottom two divisions of the Football League, the large transfer funds made available by chairman Jack Dunnett to previous managers Malky MacDonald and Tommy Cavanagh had left the club with mounting debts. Cavanagh had spent £30,000 on seven players since being appointed to the manager's job in January 1965, with five key attacking players (Bloomfield, Lazarus, Ward, Bonson and Fielding) being sold on for a total less than half that sum during the course of the 1965–66 Third Division season, towards the end of which he was sacked. New manager Billy Gray had failed to halt Brentford's relegation slide, which meant that the club would be members of the Fourth Division for the 1966–67 season. An average home attendance of 11,000 would be needed to break even and attendances had been falling year on year since the 1963–64 season. A net loss on the previous season of £19,823 on the previous season (equivalent to £322,400 in 2025) meant that manager Gray had no money to buy established players and so he brought in a number of youngsters, including his nephew John Richardson.

Brentford had a good start to the season, winning the first two matches to sit top of the Fourth Division. Despite the strikeforce being bolstered by the experienced Brian Bedford, a winless run of five defeats in eight matches dropped the club into the relegation places in mid-October 1966. Manager Billy Gray then made wholesale changes to the starting XI, introducing a number of youngsters. The new-look team went on to win five consecutive matches. The establishment of the new lineup led to a clearout of players, with out-of-favour Micky Block, Billy Cobb, John Regan, Mel Scott and Ron Crisp all exiting Griffin Park before the end of the season. The Bees failed to keep up their good form through November and December and dropped back into mid-table.

The club weathered the storm caused by the tumultuous events of 19 January 1967, which resulted in the departure of chairman Jack Dunnett and manager Billy Gray. Trainer Jimmy Sirrel took over as acting manager and built on the improved January form under Gray and led the team on a 16-match unbeaten league run, which equalled the club record at the time. The run left Brentford within three points of the promotion places, but five consecutive defeats in the final six matches of the season ended any chance of promotion.

The Brentford reserve team had a successful season, beating local rivals Fulham in a replay to win the 1966–67 London Challenge Cup.

== League table ==
Pos	Team	Pld	W	D	L	GF	GA	GAv	Pts
7	Wrexham	46	16	20	10	76	62	1.226	52
8	Hartlepools United	46	22	7	17	66	64	1.031	51
9	Brentford	46	18	13	15	58	56	1.036	49
10	Aldershot	46	18	12	16	72	57	1.263	48
11	Bradford City	46	19	10	17	74	62	1.194	48

Source: rsssf.com

== Results ==
Brentford's goal tally listed first.

=== Legend ===
Win	Draw	Loss

=== Football League Fourth Division ===
No.	Date	Opponent	Venue	Result	Attendance	Scorer(s)
1	20 August 1966	Barnsley	A	1–0	2,433	Ross
2	27 August 1966	Luton Town	H	1–0	6,770	Cobb
3	3 September 1966	Aldershot	A	1–3	5,583	Docherty
4	7 September 1966	Lincoln City	A	1–3	4,364	Richardson
5	10 September 1966	Wrexham	H	1–1	5,510	Docherty
6	17 September 1966	Southend United	A	0–3	8,200	
7	24 September 1966	Tranmere Rovers	H	1–1	5,620	Bedford
8	27 September 1966	Lincoln City	H	2–2	6,230	Grummett (og), Ross
9	1 October 1966	Bradford City	A	0–2	4,005	
10	8 October 1966	Chesterfield	A	0–3	4,968	
11	11 October 1966	Aldershot	H	1–0	6,110	Lawther
12	15 October 1966	Stockport County	H	2–1	5,710	Curley, Docherty
13	18 October 1966	Halifax Town	H	1–0	6,090	Docherty (pen)
14	22 October 1966	Rochdale	A	3–1	2,652	Lawther (2), Ross
15	29 October 1966	Southport	H	2–1	6,760	Ross, Higginson
16	5 November 1966	Notts County	A	2–3	3,883	Bedford (2)
17	12 November 1966	Chester	H	4–0	6,600	Docherty, Lawther (2), Bedford
18	15 November 1966	Halifax Town	A	2–3	2,495	Jones, Curley
19	19 November 1966	Bradford Park Avenue	A	2–2	4,182	Docherty, Curley
20	10 December 1966	Barrow	H	0–3	5,410	
21	17 December 1966	Barnsley	H	3–1	4,250	Lawther, Docherty, Bedford
22	26 December 1966	Hartlepools United	A	2–2	8,140	Scott, Docherty
23	27 December 1966	Hartlepools United	H	1–2	5,770	Docherty
24	31 December 1966	Luton Town	A	0–3	8,531	
25	14 January 1967	Wrexham	A	0–0	11,038	
26	21 January 1967	Southend United	H	1–1	10,650	Lawther
27	3 February 1967	Tranmere Rovers	A	0–0	9,836	
28	11 February 1967	Bradford City	H	2–0	7,460	Docherty, Ross
29	18 February 1967	York City	H	1–1	7,620	Lawther
30	25 February 1967	Chesterfield	H	1–0	7,010	Docherty
31	3 March 1967	Stockport County	A	2–1	8,288	Bedford, Docherty
32	11 March 1967	York City	A	0–0	1,855	
33	18 March 1967	Rochdale	H	4–0	6,340	Docherty, Ross (2), Lawther
34	25 March 1967	Port Vale	A	3–1	3,434	Richardson, Lawther, Curley
35	27 March 1967	Newport County	H	1–1	9,600	Ross
36	28 March 1967	Newport County	A	1–1	2,546	Lawther
37	1 April 1967	Notts County	H	1–0	7,760	Hooker
38	8 April 1967	Chester	A	2–1	2,683	Bedford, Higginson
39	11 April 1967	Exeter City	H	3–1	7,800	Bedford (3)
40	15 April 1967	Bradford Park Avenue	H	1–1	10,000	Ross
41	22 April 1967	Southport	A	0–2	5,231	
42	25 April 1967	Exeter City	A	0–1	2,934	
43	29 April 1967	Crewe Alexandra	H	0–2	5,710	
44	6 May 1967	Barrow	A	0–1	8,769	
45	10 May 1967	Crewe Alexandra	A	0–1	3,403	
46	13 May 1967	Port Vale	H	2–0	3,600	James (og), Wilson

=== FA Cup ===
Round	Date	Opponent	Venue	Result	Attendance	Scorer(s)
1R	26 November 1966	Chelmsford City	H	1–0	8,530	Docherty (pen)
2R	7 January 1967	Orient	A	0–0	8,094	
2R (replay)	10 January 1967	Orient	H	3–1	10,078	Docherty (2), Richardson
3R	28 January 1967	Sunderland	A	2–5	36,908	Docherty (2)

=== Football League Cup ===
Round	Date	Opponent	Venue	Result	Attendance	Scorer(s)
1R	24 August 1966	Millwall	H	0–0	7,350	
1R (replay)	29 August 1966	Millwall	A	1–0	5,222	Docherty
2R	13 September 1966	Ipswich Town	H	2–4	5,860	Crisp, Ross

- Sources: 100 Years Of Brentford, Statto

== Playing squad ==
Players' ages are as of the opening day of the 1966–67 season.

Pos.	Name	Nat.	Date of birth (age)	Signed from	Signed in	Notes
Goalkeepers
GK	Chic Brodie	(Scotland)	22 February 1937 (aged 29)	Northampton Town	1963	
GK	Gordon Phillips	(England)	17 November 1946 (aged 19)	Hayes	1963	
Defenders
DF	Peter Gelson	(England)	18 October 1941 (aged 24)	Youth	1961	
DF	Alan Hawley	(England)	7 June 1946 (aged 20)	Youth	1962	
DF	Tommy Higginson	(Scotland)	6 January 1937 (aged 29)	Kilmarnock	1959	
DF	Allan Jones	(Wales)	6 January 1940 (aged 26)	Liverpool	1963	
DF	Hamish MacKenzie	(Scotland)	11 March 1945 (aged 21)	Dunfermline Athletic	1964	
DF	Michael Ogburn	(England)	19 February 1948 (aged 18)	Portsmouth	1965	
Midfielders
MF	Phil Basey	(Wales)	27 August 1948 (aged 17)	Youth	1966	
MF	Tom Curley	(Scotland)	11 June 1945 (aged 21)	Celtic	1965	
MF	George Dobson	(England)	24 August 1949 (aged 16)	Youth	1966	
MF	John Docherty	(Scotland)	29 April 1940 (aged 26)	Sheffield United	1966	
MF	Eddie Reeve	(England)	3 December 1947 (aged 18)	Youth	1964	
MF	Bobby Ross (c)	(Scotland)	10 May 1942 (aged 24)	Shrewsbury Town	1966	
MF	George Thomson	(Scotland)	19 October 1936 (aged 29)	Everton	1963	
Forwards
FW	Brian Bedford	(Wales)	24 December 1933 (aged 32)	Scunthorpe United	1966	
FW	Brian Etheridge	(England)	4 March 1944 (aged 22)	Northampton Town	1966	
FW	Keith Hooker	(England)	31 January 1950 (aged 16)	Youth	1965	
FW	Ian Lawther	(Northern Ireland)	20 October 1939 (aged 26)	Scunthorpe United	1964	
FW	John Richardson	(England)	5 February 1949 (aged 17)	Millwall	1966	
FW	John South	(England)	8 April 1948 (aged 18)	Fulham	1966	
FW	Bobby Wilson	(England)	29 May 1944 (aged 22)	Feltham	1967	Amateur
Players who left the club mid-season
DF	Ron Crisp	(England)	24 September 1938 (aged 27)	Watford	1965	Released
MF	Billy Cobb	(England)	29 September 1940 (aged 25)	Plymouth Argyle	1964	Transferred to Luton Town
MF	Mel Scott	(England)	26 September 1939 (aged 26)	Chelsea	1963	Released
FW	John Regan	(England)	18 June 1944 (aged 22)	Shrewsbury Town	1966	Transferred to Crewe Alexandra

- Sources: 100 Years Of Brentford, Timeless Bees

== Coaching staff ==
=== Billy Gray (20 August 1965 – March 1967) ===
Name	Role
(England) Billy Gray	Manager
(Scotland) Jimmy Sirrel	Trainer
(England) Eddie Lyons	Physiotherapist

=== Jimmy Sirrel (March – 13 May 1967) ===
Name	Role
(Scotland) Jimmy Sirrel	Manager
(England) Eddie Lyons	Physiotherapist

== Statistics ==
=== Appearances and goals ===
Substitute appearances in brackets.

Pos	Nat	Name	League		FA Cup		League Cup		Total	
Pos	Nat	Name	Apps	Goals	Apps	Goals	Apps	Goals	Apps	Goals
GK	(Scotland)	Chic Brodie	8	0	0	0	3	0	11	0
GK	(England)	Gordon Phillips	38	0	4	0	0	0	42	0
DF	(England)	Ron Crisp	7	0	0	0	3	1	10	1
DF	(England)	Peter Gelson	44 (1)	0	4	0	3	0	51 (1)	0
DF	(England)	Alan Hawley	37	0	3	0	3	0	43	0
DF	(Scotland)	Tommy Higginson	43	2	4	0	3	0	50	2
DF	(Wales)	Allan Jones	23	1	4	0	0	0	27	1
DF	(Scotland)	Hamish MacKenzie	17	0	0	0	3	0	20	0
DF	(England)	Michael Ogburn	12	0	1	0	0	0	13	0
MF	(Wales)	Phil Basey	2	0	0	0	0	0	2	0
MF	(England)	Billy Cobb	7	1	—		2	0	9	1
MF	(Scotland)	Tom Curley	26	4	1	0	0	0	27	4
MF	(England)	George Dobson	2	0	0	0	0	0	2	0
MF	(Scotland)	John Docherty	43	13	4	5	3	1	50	19
MF	(England)	Eddie Reeve	18 (2)	0	1	0	1	0	20 (2)	0
MF	(Scotland)	Bobby Ross	46	9	4	0	3	1	53	10
MF	(England)	Mel Scott	12	1	0	0	2	0	14	1
MF	(Scotland)	George Thomson	25	0	3	0	0	0	28	0
FW	(Wales)	Brian Bedford	21	10	1	0	—		22	10
FW	(England)	Brian Etheridge	6	0	2	0	0	0	8	0
FW	(England)	Keith Hooker	9 (1)	1	0	0	0	0	9 (1)	1
FW	(Northern Ireland)	Ian Lawther	38 (1)	11	4	0	3	0	45 (1)	11
FW	(England)	John Regan	2	0	—		0	0	2	0
FW	(England)	John Richardson	20	2	3	1	1	0	24	3
FW	(England)	John South	1	0	1	0	0	0	2	0
FW	(England)	Bobby Wilson	1	1	—		—		1	1

- Players listed in italics left the club mid-season.
- Source: 100 Years Of Brentford

=== Goalscorers ===
Pos.	Nat	Player	FL4	FAC	FLC	Total
MF	(Scotland)	John Docherty	13	5	1	19
FW	(Northern Ireland)	Ian Lawther	11	0	0	11
FW	(Wales)	Brian Bedford	10	0	—	10
MF	(Scotland)	Bobby Ross	9	0	1	10
MF	(Scotland)	Tom Curley	4	0	0	4
FW	(England)	John Richardson	2	1	0	3
DF	(Scotland)	Tommy Higginson	2	0	0	2
FW	(England)	Bobby Wilson	1	—	—	1
MF	(England)	Billy Cobb	1	—	0	1
MF	(England)	Mel Scott	1	0	0	1
FW	(England)	Keith Hooker	1	0	0	1
DF	(Wales)	Allan Jones	1	0	0	1
DF	(England)	Ron Crisp	0	0	1	1
Opponents			2	0	0	2
Total			58	6	3	67

- Players listed in italics left the club mid-season.
- Source: 100 Years Of Brentford

=== Management ===
Name	Nat	From	To	Record All Comps					Record League				
Name	Nat	From	To	P	W	D	L	W %	P	W	D	L	W %
Billy Gray	(England)	20 August 1966	25 February 1967	37	14	11	12	37.84	30	11	9	10	36.67
Jimmy Sirrel	(Scotland)	3 March 1967	13 May 1967	16	7	4	5	43.75	16	7	4	5	43.75

=== Summary ===
Games played	53 (46 Fourth Division, 4 FA Cup, 3 League Cup)
Games won	21 (18 Fourth Division, 2 FA Cup, 1 League Cup)
Games drawn	15 (13 Fourth Division, 1 FA Cup, 1 League Cup)
Games lost	17 (15 Fourth Division, 1 FA Cup, 1 League Cup)
Goals scored	67 (58 Fourth Division, 6 FA Cup, 3 League Cup)
Goals conceded	66 (56 Fourth Division, 6 FA Cup, 4 League Cup)
Clean sheets	17 (13 Fourth Division, 2 FA Cup, 2 League Cup)
Biggest league win	4–0 on two occasions
Worst league defeat	3–0 on four occasions
Most appearances	52, Peter Gelson (45 Fourth Division, 4 FA Cup, 3 League Cup)
Top scorer (league)	13, John Docherty
Top scorer (all competitions)	19, John Docherty

== Transfers & loans ==
Players transferred in
Date	Pos.	Name	Previous club	Fee	Ref.
May 1966	FW	(England) John Richardson	(England) Millwall	n/a	
July 1966	FW	(Wales) Ellis Wyn Jones	n/a	n/a	
15 September 1966	FW	(Wales) Brian Bedford	(England) Scunthorpe United	£2,000	
November 1966	MF	(England) Alan Jefferies	(England) Didcot Town	n/a	
November 1966	FW	(England) John South	(England) Fulham	n/a	
1966	MF	(England) George Dobson	n/a	n/a	
April 1967	FW	(England) Bobby Wilson	(England) Feltham	Amateur	
Players transferred out
Date	Pos.	Name	Subsequent club	Fee	Ref.
October 1966	MF	(England) Micky Block	(England) Watford	Free	
November 1966	MF	(England) Billy Cobb	(England) Luton Town	£2,000	
November 1966	FW	(England) John Regan	(England) Crewe Alexandra	£1,000	
Players released
Date	Pos.	Name	Subsequent club	Join date	Ref.
13 December 1966	MF	(England) Ron Crisp	(United States) Los Angeles Toros	Free	
February 1967	MF	(England) Mel Scott	(United States) Oakland Clippers	February 1967	
May 1967	MF	(Wales) Phil Basey	(England) Crawley Town	1967	
May 1967	FW	(Wales) Brian Bedford	(United States) Atlanta Chiefs	1967	
May 1967	MF	(Scotland) Tom Curley	(England) Crewe Alexandra	August 1967	
May 1967	FW	(England) Brian Etheridge	(Belgium) Daring Club de Bruxelles	1967	
May 1967	MF	(England) Alan Jefferies	n/a		
May 1967	DF	(Scotland) Hamish MacKenzie	n/a		
May 1967	DF	(England) Michael Ogburn	n/a		
May 1967	FW	(England) John South	(England) Guildford City	1967	
May 1967	FW	(England) Barry Thornley	(England) Oxford United	July 1967	
May 1967	FW	(England) Bobby Wilson	(England) Walton & Hersham	Amateur	

== Awards ==
- Supporters' Player of the Year: John Docherty
