= 1965–66 Brentford F.C. season =

English football team season

Brentford
1965–66 season
- Chairman: Jack Dunnett
- Manager: Tommy Cavanagh (until 18 April 1966); Ian Black (18 April–2 May 1966); Billy Gray (from 2 May 1966)
- Stadium: Griffin Park
- Third Division: 23rd (relegated)
- FA Cup: Second round
- League Cup: Second round
- Top goalscorer: League: Lawther (10); All: Lawther (11)
- Highest home attendance: 15,000
- Lowest home attendance: 4,450
- Average home league attendance: 8,416
Home colours

During the 1965–66 English football season, Brentford competed in the Football League Third Division. After an awful first half of the season, Brentford dropped into the relegation places in January 1966 and failed to recover, ending the club's three-season spell in the Third Division.

== Season summary ==
The lack of incoming transfer activity during the 1965 off-season served to highlight the view at Griffin Park that Brentford's squad was strong enough to secure promotion to the Second Division during the 1965–66 season. The campaign began with a rousing 6–1 victory over local rivals Queens Park Rangers at Griffin Park, courtesy of goals from John Fielding, Joe Bonson, Ian Lawther and a Micky Block hat-trick. The win gave way to three defeats and a draw in the following four matches, but consecutive victories over Shrewsbury Town and Swansea Town in mid-September proved to be a false drawn. Brentford would win just one more league match before the end of 1965 and the team's plight was worsened by the departures of influential attackers Jimmy Bloomfield, Mark Lazarus and John Fielding after disputes with manager Tommy Cavanagh. Outside forward John Docherty was bought back from Sheffield United for his second spell at Griffin Park in December 1965, but Brentford began 1966 entrenched in the relegation places.

Misfiring forward Joe Bonson was sold in January 1966 and though manager Cavanagh was provided with the funds to purchase replacement forwards Brian Etheridge, John Regan and Bobby Ross, the new signings failed to help the team convert draws into all-important wins, with four matches being drawn in March. Three consecutive defeats in early April left the supporters clamouring for Cavanagh's head and despite a brief respite after a 2–0 victory over Brighton & Hove Albion, a 5–0 defeat away to Exeter City on 16 April led chairman Jack Dunnett to dispense with Cavanagh's services. Youth team manager Ian Black won, drew and lost each of the following three matches in a caretaker capacity, before Billy Gray was appointed as manager.

Gray began his reign with Brentford in 23rd place and three points from safety with five matches remaining. A 3–0 home defeat to Mansfield Town in his first match in charge effectively ended all survival hopes after the gap to safety opened up to five points. A draw and a win versus Watford and Bournemouth & Boscombe Athletic respectively in the following two matches put the Bees back within two points of safety, but defeats in the final two matches of the season sealed the club's relegation to the Fourth Division.

Three club records were set or equalled during the season:

- Most away Football League games without a win: 21 (24 April 1965 – 16 April 1966)
- Record home Football League defeat: 0–5 versus Bristol Rovers, 5 February 1966
- First substitute to be utilised: Hugh McLaughlin (replaced Billy Cobb versus Oldham Athletic, Third Division, 23 October 1965)

== League table ==
Pos	Team	Pld	W	D	L	GF	GA	GAv	Pts	Promotion or relegation
20	Oldham Athletic	46	12	13	21	55	81	0.679	37	
21	Southend United (R)	46	16	4	26	54	83	0.651	36	Relegation to the Fourth Division
22	Exeter City (R)	46	12	11	23	53	79	0.671	35	Relegation to the Fourth Division
23	Brentford (R)	46	10	12	24	48	69	0.696	32	Relegation to the Fourth Division
24	York City (R)	46	9	9	28	53	106	0.500	27	Relegation to the Fourth Division

(R) Relegated

== Results ==
Brentford's goal tally listed first.

=== Legend ===
Win	Draw	Loss

=== Football League Third Division ===
No.	Date	Opponent	Venue	Result	Attendance	Scorer(s)
1	21 August 1965	Queens Park Rangers	H	6–1	15,000	Fielding, (Block 3, 1 pen), Bonson, Lawther
2	24 August 1965	Grimsby Town	A	2–3	5,002	Block, Gelson
3	28 August 1965	Bristol Rovers	A	1–1	12,160	Cobb
4	4 September 1965	York City	H	0–1	10,850	
5	11 September 1965	Oxford United	A	0–2	10,003	
6	14 September 1965	Shrewsbury Town	H	4–0	10,950	Lazarus (2), Lawther, Cobb
7	18 September 1965	Swansea Town	H	2–0	10,300	Lawther, Block
8	25 September 1965	Walsall	A	1–1	8,384	Cobb
9	2 October 1965	Workington	H	0–1	8,700	
10	6 October 1965	Shrewsbury Town	A	0–0	4,982	
11	9 October 1965	Scunthorpe United	H	0–1	7,720	
12	16 October 1965	Watford	A	1–1	12,337	Lawther
13	23 October 1965	Oldham Athletic	H	0–0	8,110	
14	30 October 1965	Gillingham	A	0–1	8,669	
15	6 November 1965	Millwall	H	1–2	14,800	Higginson
16	20 November 1965	Exeter City	H	1–2	5,940	Cobb
17	23 November 1965	Grimsby Town	H	3–2	5,180	Cobb, Thomson, Lawther
18	27 November 1965	Reading	A	0–2	6,128	
19	11 December 1965	Mansfield Town	A	0–2	3,637	
20	1 January 1966	Scunthorpe United	A	2–3	5,568	Block, Docherty
21	8 January 1966	Peterborough United	H	1–0	7,380	Lawther
22	15 January 1966	Oldham Athletic	A	1–1	12,029	Cobb
23	29 January 1966	Queens Park Rangers	A	0–1	14,493	
24	5 February 1966	Bristol Rovers	H	0–5	6,240	
25	12 February 1966	Swindon Town	A	1–2	12,376	Docherty
26	26 February 1966	Oxford United	H	5–1	7,100	Docherty, Cobb, Etheridge, Lawther (2)
27	1 March 1966	Southend United	H	2–0	9,000	Lawther, Curley
28	5 March 1966	Swindon Town	H	0–1	9,900	
29	7 March 1966	Southend United	A	0–1	7,029	
30	12 March 1966	Swansea Town	A	1–1	7,925	Regan
31	19 March 1966	Walsall	H	2–2	7,900	Regan, Docherty (pen)
32	26 March 1966	Workington	A	1–1	2,207	Docherty
33	28 March 1966	York City	A	1–1	2,598	Etheridge
34	2 April 1966	Millwall	A	0–1	13,385	
35	8 April 1966	Brighton & Hove Albion	A	0–2	17,176	
36	9 April 1966	Hull City	H	2–4	9,920	Lawther, Docherty
37	11 April 1966	Brighton & Hove Albion	H	2–0	7,670	Regan, Curley
38	16 April 1966	Exeter City	A	0–5	4,975	
39	23 April 1966	Reading	H	1–1	7,800	Gelson
40	26 April 1966	Bournemouth & Boscombe Athletic	H	1–0	5,790	Regan
41	30 April 1966	Hull City	A	1–4	24,318	Regan
42	7 May 1966	Mansfield Town	H	0–3	7,970	
43	10 May 1966	Watford	H	1–1	5,580	Thomson
44	17 May 1966	Bournemouth & Boscombe Athletic	H	1–0	5,130	Docherty
45	21 May 1966	Peterborough United	A	0–3	3,936	
46	28 May 1966	Gillingham	H	0–2	4,450	

=== FA Cup ===
Round	Date	Opponent	Venue	Result	Attendance	Scorer(s)
1R	13 November 1965	Yeovil Town	H	2–1	9,320	Fielding (2)
2R	4 December 1965	Reading	A	0–5	10,582	

=== Football League Cup ===
Round	Date	Opponent	Venue	Result	Attendance	Scorer(s)
2R	22 November 1965	Workington	A	0–0	3,374	
2R (replay)	30 November 1965	Workington	H	1–2	4,720	Lawther

- Sources: 100 Years Of Brentford, Statto

== Playing squad ==
Players' ages are as of the opening day of the 1965–66 season.

Pos.	Name	Nat.	Date of birth (age)	Signed from	Signed in	Notes
Goalkeepers
GK	Chic Brodie	(Scotland)	22 February 1937 (aged 28)	Northampton Town	1963	
GK	Gordon Phillips	(England)	17 November 1946 (aged 18)	Hayes	1963	
Defenders
DF	Peter Gelson	(England)	18 October 1941 (aged 23)	Youth	1961	
DF	Alan Hawley	(England)	7 June 1946 (aged 19)	Youth	1962	
DF	Allan Jones	(Wales)	6 January 1940 (aged 25)	Liverpool	1963	
DF	Hamish MacKenzie	(Scotland)	11 March 1945 (aged 20)	Dunfermline Athletic	1964	
DF	George Thomson	(Scotland)	19 October 1936 (aged 28)	Everton	1963	
Midfielders
HB	Ron Crisp	(England)	24 September 1938 (aged 26)	Watford	1965	
HB	Tommy Higginson	(Scotland)	6 January 1937 (aged 28)	Kilmarnock	1959	
HB	Hugh McLaughlin	(Scotland)	2 September 1943 (aged 21)	St Roch's	1961	
HB	Eddie Reeve	(England)	3 December 1947 (aged 17)	Youth	1964	
HB	Mel Scott (c)	(England)	26 September 1939 (aged 25)	Chelsea	1963	
HB	Willie Smith	(Scotland)	6 December 1943 (aged 21)	Celtic	1963	
Forwards
FW	Micky Block	(England)	28 January 1940 (aged 25)	Chelsea	1962	
FW	Billy Cobb	(England)	29 September 1940 (aged 24)	Plymouth Argyle	1964	
FW	Tom Curley	(Scotland)	11 June 1945 (aged 20)	Celtic	1965	
FW	John Docherty	(Scotland)	29 April 1940 (aged 25)	Sheffield United	1966	
FW	Brian Etheridge	(England)	4 March 1944 (aged 21)	Northampton Town	1966	
FW	Ian Lawther	(Northern Ireland)	20 October 1939 (aged 25)	Scunthorpe United	1964	
FW	John Regan	(England)	18 June 1944 (aged 21)	Shrewsbury Town	1966	
FW	Bobby Ross	(Scotland)	10 May 1942 (aged 23)	Shrewsbury Town	1966	
FW	Barry Thornley	(England)	11 February 1948 (aged 17)	Gravesend & Northfleet	1965	
Players who left the club mid-season
FW	Jimmy Bloomfield	(England)	15 February 1934 (aged 31)	Birmingham City	1964	Transferred to West Ham United
FW	Joe Bonson	(England)	9 June 1936 (aged 29)	Newport County	1964	Transferred to Lincoln City
FW	John Fielding	(England)	2 September 1939 (aged 25)	Southport	1963	Transferred to Grimsby Town
FW	Mark Lazarus	(England)	5 December 1938 (aged 26)	Queens Park Rangers	1964	Transferred to Queens Park Rangers

- Sources: 100 Years Of Brentford, Timeless Bees

== Coaching staff ==
=== Tommy Cavanagh (21 August 1965 – 18 April 1966) ===
Name	Role
(England) Tommy Cavanagh	Manager
(Scotland) Jimmy Sirrel	Trainer
(England) Eddie Lyons	Physiotherapist

=== Ian Black (18 April – 2 May 1966) ===
Name	Role
(Scotland) Ian Black	Caretaker Manager
(Scotland) Jimmy Sirrel	Trainer
(England) Eddie Lyons	Physiotherapist

=== Billy Gray (3–28 May 1966) ===
Name	Role
(England) Billy Gray	Manager
(Scotland) Jimmy Sirrel	Trainer
(England) Eddie Lyons	Physiotherapist

== Statistics ==
=== Appearances and goals ===

Brentford's highest appearance-makers in each position during the Football League season.

Substitute appearances in brackets.

Pos	Nat	Name	League		FA Cup		League Cup		Total	
Pos	Nat	Name	Apps	Goals	Apps	Goals	Apps	Goals	Apps	Goals
GK	(Scotland)	Chic Brodie	35	0	1	0	2	0	38	0
GK	(England)	Gordon Phillips	11	0	1	0	0	0	12	0
DF	(England)	Peter Gelson	34	2	2	0	0	0	36	2
DF	(Wales)	Allan Jones	44	0	2	0	2	0	48	0
DF	(England)	Alan Hawley	36	0	2	0	2	0	40	0
DF	(Scotland)	Hamish MacKenzie	2	0	0	0	0	0	2	0
DF	(Scotland)	George Thomson	44	2	1	0	2	0	47	2
HB	(England)	Ron Crisp	10 (1)	0	1	0	0	0	11 (1)	0
HB	(Scotland)	Tommy Higginson	30	1	2	0	2	0	34	1
HB	(Scotland)	Hugh McLaughlin	0 (1)	0	0	0	0	0	0 (1)	0
HB	(England)	Eddie Reeve	2	0	0	0	0	0	2	0
HB	(England)	Mel Scott	38	0	1	0	2	0	41	0
HB	(Scotland)	Willie Smith	5	0	0	0	0	0	5	0
FW	(England)	Micky Block	29	6	2	0	2	0	33	6
FW	(England)	Jimmy Bloomfield	2	0	—		0	0	2	0
FW	(England)	Joe Bonson	12	1	1	0	2	0	15	1
FW	(England)	Billy Cobb	27 (2)	7	2	0	2	0	31 (2)	7
FW	(Scotland)	Tom Curley	14	2	0	0	0	0	14	2
FW	(Scotland)	John Docherty	26	7	—		—		26	7
FW	(England)	Brian Etheridge	16	2	—		—		16	2
FW	(England)	John Fielding	9	1	2	2	0	0	11	3
FW	(Northern Ireland)	Ian Lawther	37	10	2	0	2	1	41	11
FW	(England)	Mark Lazarus	9	2	—		2	0	11	2
FW	(England)	John Regan	12	5	—		—		12	5
FW	(Scotland)	Bobby Ross	17	0	—		—		17	0
FW	(England)	Barry Thornley	7	0	0	0	0	0	7	0

- Players listed in italics left the club mid-season.
- Source: 100 Years Of Brentford

=== Goalscorers ===
Pos.	Nat	Player	FL3	FAC	FLC	Total
FW	(Northern Ireland)	Ian Lawther	10	0	1	11
FW	(England)	Billy Cobb	7	0	0	7
FW	(Scotland)	John Docherty	7	—	—	7
FW	(England)	Micky Block	6	0	0	6
FW	(England)	John Regan	5	—	—	5
FW	(England)	John Fielding	1	2	0	3
FW	(England)	Brian Etheridge	2	—	—	2
FW	(England)	Mark Lazarus	2	—	0	2
FW	(Scotland)	Tom Curley	2	0	0	2
HB	(England)	Peter Gelson	2	0	0	2
DF	(Scotland)	George Thomson	2	0	0	2
FW	(England)	Joe Bonson	1	0	0	1
HB	(Scotland)	Tommy Higginson	1	0	0	1
Total			48	2	1	51

- Players listed in italics left the club mid-season.
- Source: 100 Years Of Brentford

=== Management ===
Name	Nat	From	To	Record All Comps					Record League				
Name	Nat	From	To	P	W	D	L	W %	P	W	D	L	W %
Tommy Cavanagh	(England)	22 August 1964	16 April 1966	42	9	11	22	21.43	38	8	10	20	21.05
Ian Black (caretaker)	(Scotland)	23 April 1966	30 April 1966	3	1	1	1	33.33	3	1	1	1	33.33
Billy Gray	(England)	7 May 1966	28 May 1966	5	1	1	3	20.00	5	1	1	3	20.00

=== Summary ===
Games played	50 (46 Third Division, 2 FA Cup, 2 League Cup)
Games won	11 (10 Third Division, 1 FA Cup, 0 League Cup)
Games drawn	13 (12 Third Division, 0 FA Cup, 1 League Cup)
Games lost	26 (24 Third Division, 1 FA Cup, 1 League Cup)
Goals scored	51 (48 Third Division, 2 FA Cup, 1 League Cup)
Goals conceded	77 (69 Third Division, 6 FA Cup, 2 League Cup)
Clean sheets	10 (9 Third Division, 0 FA Cup, 1 League Cup)
Biggest league win	6–1 versus Queens Park Rangers, 21 August 1965
Worst league defeat	5–0 on two occasions
Most appearances	48, Allan Jones (44 Third Division, 2 FA Cup, 2 League Cup)
Top scorer (league)	10, Ian Lawther
Top scorer (all competitions)	11, Ian Lawther

== Transfers & loans ==
Players transferred in
Date	Pos.	Name	Previous club	Fee	Ref.
May 1965	DF	(England) Michael Ogburn	(England) Portsmouth	n/a	
August 1965	HB	(England) Ron Crisp	(England) Watford	£2,000	
August 1965	FW	(Scotland) Tom Curley	(Scotland) Celtic	n/a	
October 1965	FW	(England) Barry Thornley	(England) Gravesend & Northfleet	£2,000	
December 1965	FW	(Scotland) John Docherty	(England) Sheffield United	n/a	
1965	HB	(England) Keith Hooker	n/a	n/a	
February 1966	FW	(England) Brian Etheridge	(England) Northampton Town	£8,000	
March 1966	FW	(England) John Regan	(England) Shrewsbury Town	£4,250	
March 1966	FW	(Scotland) Bobby Ross	(England) Shrewsbury Town	£4,250	
Players transferred out
Date	Pos.	Name	Subsequent club	Fee	Ref.
August 1965	FW	(Wales) Dai Ward	(England) Worcester City	£2,000	
October 1965	FW	(England) Jimmy Bloomfield	(England) West Ham United	£6,500	
4 November 1965	FW	(England) Mark Lazarus	(England) Queens Park Rangers	£6,000	
December 1965	FW	(England) John Fielding	(England) Grimsby Town	n/a	
January 1966	FW	(England) Joe Bonson	(England) Lincoln City	n/a	
Players released
Date	Pos.	Name	Subsequent club	Join date	Ref.
May 1966	FW	(England) Joe Gadston	(England) Corby Town	1966	
May 1966	HB	(Scotland) Hugh McLaughlin	(England) Gravesend & Northfleet	1966	
May 1966	HB	(Scotland) Willie Smith	(England) Hastings United	August 1966	
May 1966	FW	(England) Tim Soutar	(England) Ashford Town (Kent)	1966	
