= 1967–68 Brentford F.C. season =

English football team season

Brentford
1967–68 season
- Chairman: Ron Blindell
- Manager: Jimmy Sirrel
- Stadium: Griffin Park
- Fourth Division: 14th
- FA Cup: First round
- League Cup: First round
- Top goalscorer: League: Docherty, Lawther (11); All: Docherty (12)
- Highest home attendance: 9,440
- Lowest home attendance: 3,740
- Average home league attendance: 6,211
Home colours

During the 1967–68 English football season, Brentford competed in the Football League Fourth Division. Weathering the storm of a severe financial crisis for the second successive season, the threadbare squad managed a mid-table finish.

== Season summary ==
The positive outcome of the events of 19 January 1967 meant that Brentford would stay in business long enough to compete in the 1967–68 Fourth Division season. A syndicate headed by Ron Blindell had taken over the shares of former chairman Jack Dunnett and assumed control of the club, with Blindell as chairman. With a £100,000 debt (equivalent to £1,593,400 in 2025) needing to be paid by 30 June 1968, drastic cost-cutting measures were enacted at Griffin Park. Brentford's reserve and youth teams were scrapped and a mass clear-out of the squad led to just 16 professionals being retained. Having been installed in the role full-time, manager Jimmy Sirrel was permitted to sign a small number of players, including Chelsea youth product Alan Nelmes and Charlton Athletic's inside forward Cliff Myers.

Injuries to John Richardson and George Thomson prior to the opening match of the season left Brentford with just 15 fit players and a lack of personnel would be a running saga during the campaign. Regular goals from John Docherty and Ian Lawther in the early months of the season helped Brentford tread water in mid-table and then slowly rise towards the promotion places, coming as high as 6th place by early December 1967. Hopes of money-raising runs in the FA Cup and League Cup were extinguished with first round defeats in each competition, but chairman Blindell had revealed the positive news in November that the club was more or less breaking even. 9 defeats and just one victory in a 12-match spell between December 1967 and February 1968 undid all the good early-season work and dropped the Bees back into mid-table. Manager Sirrel was permitted to spend £12,000 on attackers Ron Fenton and Allan Mansley in January 1968, but was forced to sell Cliff Myers and top-scorer John Docherty to balance the books.

By March 1968, spiralling debts and the "Brentford Borough" saga threatened the club's existence for the second time in a year. With £70,000 of the £135,000 debt needed to be paid in June 1968, former director Walter Wheatley stepped in and provided the club with a £69,000 interest-fee loan, repayable in 12 months. On the pitch, the team had experienced something of a revival, winning five matches and drawing two of a 9-match spell between late February and early April, but the retirement of George Thomson and the departure of Eddie Reeve left manager Jimmy Sirrel with just 14 players with which to complete the season. Brentford finished in 14th place and used just 18 outfield players during the course of the season.

== League table ==
Pos	Team	Pld	W	D	L	GF	GA	GAv	Pts
12	Newport County	46	16	13	17	58	63	0.921	45
13	Lincoln City	46	17	9	20	71	68	1.044	43
14	Brentford	46	18	7	21	61	64	0.953	43
15	Swansea Town	46	16	10	20	63	77	0.818	42
16	Darlington	46	12	17	17	47	53	0.887	41

Source: rsssf.com
Rules for classification: 1) points; 2) goal average; 3) number of goals scored.

== Results ==
Brentford's goal tally listed first.

=== Legend ===
Win	Draw	Loss

=== Football League Fourth Division ===
No.	Date	Opponent	Venue	Result	Attendance	Scorer(s)
1	19 August 1967	Hartlepools United	A	0–2	5,343	
2	26 August 1967	Newport County	H	3–1	4,500	Docherty, Lawther, Dobson
3	2 September 1967	York City	A	1–0	4,529	Docherty
4	5 September 1967	Swansea Town	A	1–2	6,559	Docherty (pen)
5	9 September 1967	Rochdale	H	4–0	5,630	Ross, Docherty, Lawther, Melledew (og)
6	16 September 1967	Halifax Town	H	0–0	6,890	
7	23 September 1967	Bradford Park Avenue	A	0–1	3,403	
8	26 September 1967	Swansea Town	H	2–1	7,570	Lawther, Docherty
9	30 September 1967	Doncaster Rovers	H	4–2	7,300	Lawther, Edwards, Jones, Thomson
10	2 October 1967	Wrexham	A	2–1	8,000	Smith (og), Docherty
11	7 October 1967	Crewe Alexandra	A	0–2	6,246	
12	14 October 1967	Notts County	H	2–1	7,430	Edwards, Lawther
13	21 October 1967	Port Vale	A	1–4	5,944	Higginson
14	24 October 1967	Wrexham	H	0–0	7,960	
15	28 October 1967	Chester	H	3–1	6,290	Hooker, Thomson, Hawley
16	4 November 1967	Chesterfield	A	1–2	9,644	Higginson
17	11 November 1967	Exeter City	H	5–1	7,215	Lawther (2), Ross, Wilkinson (og), Docherty
18	14 November 1967	York City	H	3–1	7,910	Lawther, Gelson, Dobson
19	18 November 1967	Darlington	A	3–2	4,789	Gelson, Dobson, Albeson (og)
20	25 November 1967	Aldershot	H	1–1	9,440	Docherty
21	2 December 1967	Workington	A	0–2	1,764	
22	16 December 1967	Hartlepools United	H	0–1	6,200	
23	23 December 1967	Newport County	A	2–2	2,700	Docherty (2)
24	26 December 1967	Southend United	H	1–2	8,360	Richardson
25	30 December 1967	Southend United	A	0–1	9,059	
26	6 January 1968	Barnsley	H	0–1	5,180	
27	20 January 1968	Halifax Town	A	0–3	4,610	
28	27 January 1968	Bradford City	H	0–1	5,550	
29	3 February 1968	Bradford Park Avenue	H	2–1	4,310	Dobson, Fenton
30	10 February 1968	Doncaster Rovers	A	0–2	7,183	
31	17 February 1968	Luton Town	H	0–2	7,710	
32	24 February 1968	Darlington	H	2–0	4,155	Lawther (2)
33	2 March 1968	Notts County	A	1–2	4,486	Nelmes
34	9 March 1968	Bradford City	A	3–2	7,118	Fenton (2), Gelson (pen)
35	16 March 1968	Port Vale	H	3–1	4,700	Fenton, Hawley, Mansley
36	18 March 1968	Rochdale	A	1–1	1,722	Cockcroft (og)
37	23 March 1968	Chester	A	0–3	2,861	
38	30 March 1968	Chesterfield	H	1–1	3,845	Lawther
39	6 April 1968	Exeter City	A	3–0	3,900	Higginson, Fenton (2)
40	13 April 1968	Crewe Alexandra	H	2–1	5,390	Mansley (2)
41	15 April 1968	Barnsley	A	0–3	12,174	
42	20 April 1968	Aldershot	A	0–0	5,183	
43	23 April 1968	Lincoln City	H	1–3	4,890	Gelson (pen)
44	27 April 1968	Workington	H	2–1	3,740	Mansley, Gelson
45	4 May 1968	Lincoln City	A	0–1	8,701	
46	11 May 1968	Luton Town	A	1–2	14,643	Moore (og)

=== FA Cup ===
Round	Date	Opponent	Venue	Result	Attendance	Scorer(s)	Notes
1R	13 December 1967	Guildford City	H	2–2	6,725	Docherty, Myers	(Note: Both teams wore change colours.)
1R (replay)	18 December 1967	Guildford City	A	1–2	10,050	Myers	

=== Football League Cup ===
Round	Date	Opponent	Venue	Result	Attendance
1R	23 August 1967	Southend United	A	0–1	7,905

- Sources: 100 Years Of Brentford, Statto

== Playing squad ==
Players' ages are as of the opening day of the 1967–68 season.

Pos.	Name	Nat.	Date of birth (age)	Signed from	Signed in	Notes
Goalkeepers
GK	Chic Brodie	(Scotland)	22 February 1937 (aged 30)	Northampton Town	1963	
GK	Gordon Phillips	(England)	17 November 1946 (aged 20)	Hayes	1963	
Defenders
DF	Peter Gelson (c)	(England)	18 October 1941 (aged 25)	Youth	1961	
DF	Alan Hawley	(England)	7 June 1946 (aged 21)	Youth	1962	
DF	Tommy Higginson	(Scotland)	6 January 1937 (aged 30)	Kilmarnock	1959	
DF	Allan Jones	(Wales)	6 January 1940 (aged 27)	Liverpool	1963	
DF	Alan Nelmes	(England)	20 October 1948 (aged 18)	Chelsea	1967	
Midfielders
MF	George Dobson	(England)	24 August 1949 (aged 17)	Youth	1966	
MF	Allan Mansley	(England)	31 August 1946 (aged 20)	Blackpool	1968	
MF	John Richardson	(England)	5 February 1949 (aged 18)	Millwall	1966	
MF	Bobby Ross	(Scotland)	10 May 1942 (aged 25)	Shrewsbury Town	1966	
MF	George Thomson	(Scotland)	19 October 1936 (aged 30)	Everton	1963	
Forwards
FW	Ron Fenton	(England)	21 September 1940 (aged 26)	Birmingham City	1968	
FW	Keith Hooker	(England)	31 January 1950 (aged 17)	Youth	1965	
FW	Ian Lawther	(Northern Ireland)	20 October 1939 (aged 27)	Scunthorpe United	1964	
Players who left the club mid-season
MF	John Docherty	(Scotland)	29 April 1940 (aged 27)	Sheffield United	1966	Transferred to Reading
MF	Cliff Myers	(England)	23 September 1946 (aged 20)	Charlton Athletic	1967	Transferred to Yeovil Town
FW	Dennis Edwards	(England)	19 January 1937 (aged 30)	Portsmouth	1967	Returned to Portsmouth after loan
FW	Eddie Reeve	(England)	3 December 1947 (aged 19)	Youth	1964	Loaned to Lincoln City, released
FW	Ron Still	(Scotland)	20 June 1943 (aged 24)	Notts County	1967	Released

- Sources: 100 Years Of Brentford, Timeless Bees

== Coaching staff ==
Name	Role
(Scotland) Jimmy Sirrel	Manager
(England) Eddie Lyons	Physiotherapist

== Statistics ==
=== Appearances and goals ===
Substitute appearances in brackets.

Pos	Nat	Name	League		FA Cup		League Cup		Total	
Pos	Nat	Name	Apps	Goals	Apps	Goals	Apps	Goals	Apps	Goals
GK	(Scotland)	Chic Brodie	1	0	0	0	0	0	1	0
GK	(England)	Gordon Phillips	45	0	2	0	1	0	48	0
DF	(England)	Peter Gelson	43	5	2	0	1	0	46	5
DF	(England)	Alan Hawley	46	2	2	0	1	0	49	2
DF	(Scotland)	Tommy Higginson	41 (1)	3	2	0	1	0	44 (1)	3
DF	(Wales)	Allan Jones	42 (1)	1	2	0	1	0	45 (1)	1
DF	(England)	Alan Nelmes	24	1	2	0	0 (1)	0	26 (1)	1
MF	(England)	George Dobson	36	3	0	0	1	0	37	3
MF	(Scotland)	John Docherty	28	11	2	1	1	0	31	12
MF	(England)	Allan Mansley	19	4	—		—		19	4
MF	(England)	Cliff Myers	9 (1)	0	1 (1)	2	1	0	11 (2)	2
MF	(England)	John Richardson	20 (1)	1	1	0	0	0	21 (1)	1
MF	(Scotland)	Bobby Ross	39 (2)	2	2	0	1	0	42 (2)	2
MF	(Scotland)	George Thomson	29	2	2	0	0	0	31	2
FW	(England)	Ron Fenton	19	6	—		—		19	6
FW	(England)	Keith Hooker	16 (5)	1	1	0	1	0	18 (5)	1
FW	(Northern Ireland)	Ian Lawther	40	11	1	0	1	0	42	11
FW	(England)	Eddie Reeve	1 (1)	0	0	0	0	0	1 (1)	0
FW	(Scotland)	Ron Still	1	0	—		—		1	0
Players loaned in during the season
FW	(England)	Dennis Edwards	11	2	—		—		11	2

- Players listed in italics left the club mid-season.
- Source: 100 Years Of Brentford

=== Goalscorers ===
Pos.	Nat	Player	FL4	FAC	FLC	Total
MF	(Scotland)	John Docherty	11	1	0	12
FW	(Northern Ireland)	Ian Lawther	11	0	0	11
FW	(England)	Ron Fenton	6	—	—	6
DF	(England)	Peter Gelson	5	0	0	5
MF	(England)	Allan Mansley	4	—	—	4
MF	(England)	George Dobson	3	0	0	3
DF	(Scotland)	Tommy Higginson	3	0	0	3
FW	(England)	Dennis Edwards	2	—	—	2
DF	(England)	Alan Hawley	2	0	0	2
MF	(Scotland)	Bobby Ross	2	0	0	2
MF	(Scotland)	George Thomson	2	0	0	2
MF	(England)	Cliff Myers	0	2	0	2
FW	(England)	Keith Hooker	1	0	0	1
DF	(Wales)	Allan Jones	1	0	0	1
DF	(England)	Alan Nelmes	1	0	0	1
MF	(England)	John Richardson	1	0	0	1
Opponents			6	0	0	6
Total			61	3	0	64

- Players listed in italics left the club mid-season.
- Source: 100 Years Of Brentford

=== Management ===
Name	Nat	From	To	Record All Comps					Record League				
Name	Nat	From	To	P	W	D	L	W %	P	W	D	L	W %
Jimmy Sirrel	(Scotland)	19 August 1967	11 May 1968	49	18	8	23	36.73	46	18	7	21	39.13

=== Summary ===
Games played	49 (46 Fourth Division, 2 FA Cup, 1 League Cup)
Games won	18 (18 Fourth Division, 0 FA Cup, 0 League Cup)
Games drawn	8 (7 Fourth Division, 1 FA Cup, 0 League Cup)
Games lost	23 (21 Fourth Division, 1 FA Cup, 1 League Cup)
Goals scored	64 (61 Fourth Division, 3 FA Cup, 0 League Cup)
Goals conceded	69 (64 Fourth Division, 4 FA Cup, 1 League Cup)
Clean sheets	7 (7 Fourth Division, 0 FA Cup, 0 League Cup)
Biggest league win	4–0 versus Rochdale, 9 September 1967; 5–1 versus Exeter City, 11 November 1967
Worst league defeat	3–0 on three occasions; 4–1 versus Port Vale, 21 October 1967
Most appearances	49, Alan Hawley (46 Fourth Division, 2 FA Cup, 1 League Cup)
Top scorer (league)	11, John Docherty, Ian Lawther
Top scorer (all competitions)	12, John Docherty

== Transfers & loans ==
Players transferred in
Date	Pos.	Name	Previous club	Fee	Ref.
June 1967	MF	(England) Cliff Myers	(England) Charlton Athletic	n/a	
July 1967	DF	(England) Alan Nelmes	(England) Chelsea	n/a	
July 1967	FW	(Scotland) Ron Still	(England) Notts County	Trial	
August 1967	MF	(England) Geoff Anderson	(England) Lincoln City	n/a	
January 1968	FW	(England) Ron Fenton	(England) Birmingham City	n/a	
January 1968	MF	(England) Allan Mansley	(England) Blackpool	n/a	
February 1968	FW	(England) Dave Boothman	(England) Hampton	Amateur	
February 1968	GK	(England) John Maskell	(England) Wycombe Wanderers	Amateur	
Players loaned in
Date from	Pos.	Name	From	Date to	Ref.
September 1967	FW	(England) Dennis Edwards	(England) Portsmouth	December 1967	
Players transferred out
Date	Pos.	Name	Subsequent club	Fee	Ref.
November 1967	MF	(England) Geoff Anderson	(England) Port Vale	n/a	
February 1968	MF	(Scotland) John Docherty	(England) Reading	n/a	
1968	MF	(England) Cliff Myers	(England) Yeovil Town	n/a	
Players loaned out
Date from	Pos.	Name	To	Date to	Ref.
n/a	FW	(England) Eddie Reeve	(England) Lincoln City	n/a	
Players released
Date	Pos.	Name	Subsequent club	Join date	Ref.
August 1967	FW	(Scotland) Ron Still	(England) Margate	1967	
March 1968	FW	(England) Eddie Reeve	(United States) Los Angeles Wolves	March 1968	
May 1968	MF	(Scotland) George Thomson	Retired		
