= Basey (disambiguation) =

Basey is a municipality in Samar, Philippines.

Basey may also refer to:

- Grant Basey (born 1988), Welsh former footballer
- Phil Basey (born 1948), Welsh former footballer

== See also ==
- Base (disambiguation)
- Basie (disambiguation)
- Basye (disambiguation)
