= Matthew Craig =

Scottish footballer

Personal information
- Full name: Matthew George Craig
- Date of birth: 16 April 2003 (age 23)
- Place of birth: Barnet, England
- Height: 1.84 m (6 ft 0 in)
- Positions: Defensive midfielder; centre-back; right-back

Team information
- Current team: Port Vale
- Number: 37

Youth career
- 20??–2015: Watford
- 2015–2023: Tottenham Hotspur

Senior career*
Years	Team	Apps	(Gls)
2023–2026	Tottenham Hotspur	1	(0)
2024	→ Doncaster Rovers (loan)	18	(1)
2024–2025	→ Barnsley (loan)	14	(0)
2025	→ Mansfield Town (loan)	5	(1)
2026–	Port Vale	2	(0)

International career
2018–2019	Scotland U16	6	(0)
2021–2022	Scotland U19	6	(0)
2022	Scotland U21	1	(0)
- * Club domestic league appearances and goals as of 22:18, 1 September 2026 (UTC)

Matthew George Craig (born 16 April 2003) is a professional footballer who plays as a defensive midfielder for EFL League Two club Port Vale. Born in England, he represented Scotland up to under-21 level. His identical twin brother, Michael, is also a professional footballer, as was their grandfather, Ron Still.

Craig turned professional at Tottenham Hotspur in 2021, making his Premier League debut in May 2023. He had loan spells at Doncaster Rovers, Barnsley, and Mansfield Town. He left Spurs to join Port Vale in June 2026.

== Early life ==
Matthew George Craig and his older identical twin brother, Michael, were born two minutes apart at Barnet Hospital on 16 March 2003. Their grandfather, Aberdeen-born Ron Still, top-scored for Notts County in the 1965–66 season. Their father, David, played non-League football for Cockfosters and Broxbourne.

Craig was a county cup winner and 1,500m district champion while attending Dame Alice Owen's School in Potters Bar.

== Career ==
=== Tottenham Hotspur ===
Craig is a youth product of Watford who moved to the academy of Tottenham Hotspur with his brother at the age of 12. He first played for the under-18 team in 2018–19, and went on to miss just one game of the 2020–21 campaign under the stewardship of Matthew Taylor. In May 2021, he signed a two-year professional contract at Spurs, moving to the Development Squad. He went on to captain the under-21 team. He and his brother were named by Nuno Espírito Santo in a matchday squad for a UEFA Europa Conference League game in August 2021, the first time that identical twins appeared on a squadlist for the club. He was named in matchday squads for the final five Premier League games of the 2021–22 season after manager Antonio Conte faced an injury crisis. Twin Michael was sold to Reading in the summer. Craig stayed at the Tottenham Hotspur Stadium and made his senior debut under Ryan Mason as a late substitute in a 4–1 win over Leeds United on 28 May 2023. He signed a new three-year contract in July 2023.

On 9 January 2024, Craig joined League Two club Doncaster Rovers on loan until the end of the 2023–24 season after being tracked by manager Grant McCann since the start of the campaign. He helped Donny to show a drastic upturn in form and move from one place above the relegation zone to qualifying for the League Two play-offs with a club record ten straight victories, of which he played nine. He said he had "loved every minute" of his time at the Eco-Power Stadium. Rovers were beaten by Crewe Alexandra on penalties in the play-off semi-finals. He played 20 matches, scoring once against Grimsby Town and providing two assists.

On 22 July 2024, Craig joined League One club Barnsley on loan until the end of the 2024–25 season. He played 16 games for the Tykes, initially starting under Darrell Clarke before being dropped to the bench in November and from the matchday squad entirely over the new year. Clarke praised Craig, but said there was "serious competition for places" in the Barnsley midfield from Luca Connell and Kelechi Nwakali. On 9 January 2025, Craig was recalled from his loan at Oakwell, allowing him to join fellow League One side Mansfield Town on loan for the remainder of the 2024–25 season. Doncaster Rovers had attempted to re-sign him. Mansfield manager Nigel Clough said he would provide competition for Louis Reed at Field Mill. He played six games for the Stags, scoring one goal, before his loan spell was ended by an Anterior cruciate ligament injury that saw him sidelined for eight months. He was released by Spurs at the end of the 2025–26 season.

=== Port Vale ===
On 24 June 2026, Craig signed a three-year contract with League Two club Port Vale, with manager Jon Brady saying he fitted the desired player profile of being "young, hungry and on an upward trajectory in his career". He was signed to compete with George Byers for a first-team place. He missed the start of the 2026–27 season due to issues with his back. He played three games before suffering another ACL tear in September and being ruled out for the rest of the 2026–27 season.

== International career ==
Craig has represented Scotland at age group level. He said of he and his brother's international allegiance, "Both of my grandfathers are Scottish. Obviously, once Scotland came calling, it was a big honour to be selected here. There wasn't a debate". He captained Scotland in younger age groups.

== Style of play ==
Craig is a central defensive midfielder, though can also play in defence as a right-back or centre-back. He has been praised for his reading of the game, using his intelligence and stamina in defence whilst maintaining calm in attack to play simple passes.

== Career statistics ==
As of match played 22 September 2026

Appearances and goals by club, season and competition
Club	Season	League			FA Cup		EFL Cup		Other		Total	
Club	Season	Division	Apps	Goals	Apps	Goals	Apps	Goals	Apps	Goals	Apps	Goals
Tottenham Hotspur U21	2021–22	—			—		—		1 (Note: Appearance(s) in the EFL Trophy)	0	1	0
Tottenham Hotspur U21	2022–23	—			—		—		2	0	2	0
Tottenham Hotspur U21	2023–24	—			—		—		1	0	1	0
Tottenham Hotspur U21	Total		0	0	0	0	0	0	4	0	4	0
Tottenham Hotspur	2021–22	Premier League	0	0	0	0	0	0	0	0	0	0
Tottenham Hotspur	2022–23	Premier League	1	0	0	0	0	0	0	0	1	0
Tottenham Hotspur	2023–24	Premier League	0	0	0	0	0	0	0	0	0	0
Tottenham Hotspur	2024–25	Premier League	0	0	0	0	0	0	0	0	0	0
Tottenham Hotspur	2025–26	Premier League	0	0	0	0	0	0	0	0	0	0
Tottenham Hotspur	Total		1	0	0	0	0	0	0	0	1	0
Doncaster Rovers (loan)	2023–24	League Two	18	1	—		—		2 (Note: Appearance(s) in the League Two play-offs)	0	20	1
Barnsley (loan)	2024–25	League One	14	0	0	0	2	0	0	0	16	0
Mansfield Town (loan)	2024–25	League One	5	1	1	0	0	0	0	0	6	1
Port Vale	2026–27	League Two	2	0	0	0	0	0	1	0	3	0
Career total			40	2	1	0	2	0	7	0	50	2
