= Basye =

Basye may refer to:

- Basye, Virginia, United States, a census-designated place
- Chuck Basye (born 1958), American politician
- John Walter Basye (1770–1845), founder of the city of Louisiana, Missouri, United States

== See also ==
- Basey (disambiguation)
- Basie (disambiguation)
