= List of Doncaster Rovers F.C. seasons =

League Positions 1902–2018

This is a list of seasons played by Doncaster Rovers Football Club in English football, from 1891 to the present day.

== Key ==
Key to league record

- Level = Level of the league in the current league system
- Pld = Games played
- W = Games won
- D = Games drawn
- L = Games lost
- GF = Goals for
- GA = Goals against
- GD = Goals difference
- Pts = Points
- Position = Position in the final league table
- Top scorer and number of goals scored shown in bold when he was also top scorer for the division. Number of goals includes goals scored in play-offs.

Key to cup records

- Res = Final reached round
- Rec = Final club record in the form of wins-draws-losses
- PR = Preliminary round
- QR1 (2, etc.) = Qualifying Cup rounds
- G = Group stage
- R1 (2, etc.) = Proper Cup rounds
- QF = Quarter-finalists
- SF = Semi-finalists
- F = Finalists
- A (QF, SF, F) = Area quarter-, semi-, finalists
- W = Winners

== Seasons ==
Year	League	Lvl	Pld	W	D	L	GF	GA	GD	Pts	Position	Leading league scorer		FA Cup		FL Cup		FL Trophy FA Trophy		Average home attendance (Note: Average home attendance = for league games only)
Year	League	Lvl	Pld	W	D	L	GF	GA	GD	Pts	Position	Name	Goals	Res	Rec	Res	Rec	Res	Rec	Average home attendance
1891–92	**Midland League**		20	8	5	7	30	36	-6	22	**6th of 11**	William 'Mickey' Bennett; Charles Waddington	5							
1892–93	**Midland League**		24	11	4	9	47	44	+3	26	**5th of 13**	Billy Smith	12							
1893–94	**Midland League**		20	5	4	11	27	48	-21	14	**7th of 11**	Alex Lee	6							
1894–95	**Midland League**		26	6	6	14	35	70	-35	18	**12th of 14**	A Mackie	7							
1895–96	**Midland League**		28	10	6	12	44	56	-12	26	**10th of 15**	Bullock; W Fellows	8							
1896–97	**Midland League**		28	17	5	6	77	40	+37	39	**1st of 15**	Goodison	18							
1897–98	**Midland League**		22	5	6	11	33	35	-2	16	**10th of 12**	Arnold Oxspring	7							
1898–99	**Midland League**		26	14	5	7	56	47	+9	33	**1st of 14**	'Dutch' Gladwin	13							
1899–1900	**Midland League**		24	9	6	9	51	42	+9	24	**7th of 13**	Arnold Oxspring	11							
1900–01	**Midland League**		26	17	2	7	87	2	+55	36	**2nd of 14**	Len Goodson; Tommy Vail	20							
The club elected to the Football League.
1901–02	**Football League**; **Second Division**	2	34	13	8	13	49	58	-9	34	**7th of 18**	Jack Price	13							4,000
1902–03	**Football League**; **Second Division**	2	34	9	7	18	35	72	-37	25	**16th of 18**	Billy Langham	8							5,800
The club voted out of the Football League.
1903–04	**Midland League**		34	13	5	16	58	55	+3	31	**11th of 18**	Joe Moran	12							
The club elected to the Football League.
1904–05	**Football League**; **Second Division**	2	34	3	2	29	23	81	-58	8	**18th of 18**	James Carnegie; George McGhee; Bob Norris; Bert Shinner	3							3,000
The club voted out of the Football League.
1905–06	**Midland League**		34	10	6	18	47	78	-31	26	**14th of 18**									
1906–07	**Midland League**		38	10	7	21	52	82	-30	27	**17th of 20**									
1907–08	**Midland League**		38	14	4	20	48	65	-17	32	**15th of 20**									
1908–09	**Midland League**		38	18	3	17	50	58	-8	39	**11th of 20**									
1909–10	**Midland League**		42	14	11	17	51	66	-15	39	**14th of 22**									
1910–11	**Midland League**		38	23	4	11	106	63	+43	50	**3rd of 20**									
1911–12	**Midland League**		36	21	6	9	79	42	+37	48	**3rd of 19**									
1912–13	**Midland League**		38	21	7	10	67	43	+24	49	**4th of 20**									
1913–14	**Midland League**		34	12	2	20	30	51	-21	26	**16th of 18**									
1914–15	**Midland League**		38	14	3	21	58	82	-24	31	**15th of 20**									
No competitive football was played between 1915 and 1919 due to the World War I.
1920–21	**Midland League**		38	11	10	17	38	54	-16	32	**16th of 20**									
1921–22	**Midland League**		42	17	6	19	52	66	-14	40	**13th of 22**									
1922–23	**Midland League**		42	26	9	7	72	28	+44	61	**2nd of 22**									
The club elected to the Football League.
1923–24	**Football League**; **Third Division North**	3	42	15	12	15	59	53	+6	42	**9th of 22**									7,285
1924–25	**Football League**; **Third Division North**	3	42	14	10	18	54	65	-11	38	**18th of 22**			R1	2-0-1					5,380
1925–26	**Football League**; **Third Division North**	3	42	16	11	15	80	72	+8	43	**10th of 22**			R2	1-0-1					5,190
1926–27	**Football League**; **Third Division North**	3	42	18	11	13	81	65	+16	47	**8th of 22**			R2	1-0-1					5,334
1927–28	**Football League**; **Third Division North**	3	42	23	7	12	80	44	+36	53	**4th of 22**			R1	0-0-1					7,574
1928–29	**Football League**; **Third Division North**	3	42	20	10	12	76	66	+10	50	**5th of 22**			R1	0-0-1					6,733
1929–30	**Football League**; **Third Division North**	3	42	15	9	18	62	69	-7	39	**14th of 22**			R4	3-2-1					4,652
1930–31	**Football League**; **Third Division North**	3	42	13	11	18	65	65	0	37	**15th of 22**			R2	1-0-1					4,176
1931–32	**Football League**; **Third Division North**	3	40	16	4	20	59	80	-21	36	**15th of 21**			R2	1-3-1					3,903
1932–33	**Football League**; **Third Division North**	3	42	17	14	11	77	79	-2	48	**6th of 22**			R3	2-0-1					5,262
1933–34	**Football League**; **Third Division North**	3	42	22	9	11	83	61	+22	53	**5th of 22**			R1	0-0-1					6,000
1934–35	**Football League**; **Third Division North**	3	42	26	5	11	87	44	+43	57	**1st of 22**; **Promoted**			R1	0-0-1					10,761
1935–36	**Football League**; **Second Division**	2	42	14	9	19	51	71	-20	37	**18th of 22**			R3	0-0-1					14,122
1936–37	**Football League**; **Second Division**	2	42	7	10	25	30	84	-54	24	**22nd of 22**; Relegated			R3	0-0-1					11,697
1937–38	**Football League**; **Third Division North**	3	42	21	19	9	74	49	+25	54	**2nd of 22**			R3	2-0-1					12,373
1938–39	**Football League**; **Third Division North**	3	42	21	14	7	87	47	+40	56	**2nd of 22**			R4	3-1-1					11,587
No competitive football was played between 1939 and 1946 due to the World War II.
1946–47	**Football League**; **Third Division North**	3	42	33	6	3	123	40	+83	72	**1st of 22**; Promoted			R3	2-1-1					15,339
1947–48	**Football League**; **Second Division**	2	42	9	11	22	40	66	-26	29	**21st of 22**; Relegated			R3	0-0-1					22,317
1948–49	**Football League**; **Third Division North**	3	42	20	10	12	53	40	+13	50	**3rd of 22**			R1	0-0-1					13,842
1949–50	**Football League**; **Third Division North**	3	42	19	17	6	66	38	+28	55	**1st of 22**; Promoted			R4	3-0-1					18,252
1950–51	**Football League**; **Second Division**	2	42	15	13	14	64	68	-4	43	**11th of 22**			R3	0-0-1					22,838
1951–52	**Football League**; **Second Division**	2	42	13	12	17	55	60	-5	38	**16th of 22**			R5	2-0-1					21,078
1952–53	**Football League**; **Second Division**	2	42	12	16	14	58	64	-6	40	**13th of 22**			R3	0-0-1					15,862
1953–54	**Football League**; **Second Division**	2	42	16	9	17	59	63	-4	41	**12th of 22**			R5	2-0-1					16,983
1954–55	**Football League**; **Second Division**	2	42	14	7	21	58	95	-37	35	**18th of 22**			R5	2-4-1					12,385
1955–56	**Football League**; **Second Division**	2	42	12	11	19	69	96	-27	35	**17th of 22**			R5	2-1-1					12,414
1956–57	**Football League**; **Second Division**	2	42	15	10	17	77	77	0	40	**14th of 22**			R3	0-1-1					12,375
1957–58	**Football League**; **Second Division**	2	42	8	11	23	56	88	-32	27	**22nd of 22**; Relegated			R3	0-0-1					11,129
1958–59	**Football League**; **Third Division**	3	46	14	5	27	50	90	-40	33	**22nd of 24**; Relegated			R3	2-0-1					6,665
1959–60	**Football League**; **Fourth Division**	4	46	16	10	20	59	76	-7	42	**17th of 24**			R3	2-2-1					5,247
1960–61	**Football League**; **Fourth Division**	4	46	19	7	20	76	78	-2	45	**11th of 24**			R1	0-1-1	R3	1-0-1			4,754
1961–62	**Football League**; **Fourth Division**	4	44	11	7	26	60	85	-25	29	**21st of 23**			R1	0-0-1	R2	1-0-1			4,471
1962–63	**Football League**; **Fourth Division**	4	46	14	14	18	64	77	-13	42	**16th of 24**			R2	1-1-1	R2	1-1-1			6,303
1963–64	**Football League**; **Fourth Division**	4	46	15	12	19	70	75	-5	42	**14th of 24**			R3	2-2-1	R1	0-1-1			6,355
1964–65	**Football League**; **Fourth Division**	4	46	20	11	15	84	72	+12	51	**9th of 24**			R3	2-1-1	R3	2-0-1			8,135
1965–66	**Football League**; **Fourth Division**	4	46	24	11	11	85	54	+31	59	**1st of 24**; Promoted			R1	0-1-1	R2	1-1-1			10,398
1966–67	**Football League**; **Third Division**	3	46	12	8	26	58	117	-59	32	**23rd of 24**; Relegated			R1	0-1-1	R3	2-3-1			7,906
1967–68	**Football League**; **Fourth Division**	4	46	18	15	13	66	56	+10	51	**10th of 24**			R3	2-1-1	R1	0-0-1			7,852
1969–68	**Football League**; **Fourth Division**	4	46	21	17	8	65	38	+27	59	**1st of 24**; Promoted			R3	2-0-1	R1	0-1-1			10,212
1969–70	**Football League**; **Third Division**	3	46	17	12	17	52	54	-2	46	**11th of 24**			R2	1-2-1	R2	1-0-1			8,564
1970–71	**Football League**; **Third Division**	3	46	13	9	24	45	66	-21	35	**23rd of 24**; Relegated			R1	0-1-1	R1	0-1-1			4,473
1971–72	**Football League**; **Fourth Division**	4	46	16	14	16	56	63	-7	46	**12th of 24**			R1	0-0-1	R1	0-0-1			4,126
1972–73	**Football League**; **Fourth Division**	4	46	15	12	19	59	58	-9	42	**17th of 24**			R3	2-0-1	R1	0-0-1			2,259
1973–74	**Football League**; **Fourth Division**	4	46	12	11	23	47	80	-33	35	**22nd of 24**			R3	2-1-1	R2	1-0-1			2,395
1974–75	**Football League**; **Fourth Division**	4	46	14	12	20	65	79	-14	40	**17th of 24**			R2	1-0-1	R2	1-0-1			2,975
1975–76	**Football League**; **Fourth Division**	4	46	19	11	16	75	69	+6	49	**10th of 24**			R1	0-0-1	QF	4-2-1			6,056
1976–77	**Football League**; **Fourth Division**	4	46	21	9	16	74	65	+6	51	**8th of 24**			R1	0-1-1	R2	0-3-1			4,631
1977–78	**Football League**; **Fourth Division**	4	46	14	17	15	52	65	-13	45	**12th of 24**			R1	0-0-1	R1	0-0-2			3,228
1978–79	**Football League**; **Fourth Division**	4	46	13	11	22	50	73	-23	37	**22nd of 24**			R2	1-0-1	R1	1-0-2			2,978
1979–80	**Football League**; **Fourth Division**	4	46	15	14	17	62	63	-1	44	**12th of 24**			R2	1-0-1	R2	2-1-1			4,315
1980–81	**Football League**; **Fourth Division**	4	46	22	12	12	59	49	+10	56	**3rd of 24**; Promoted			R3	2-0-1	R1	0-1-1			5,412
1981–82	**Football League**; **Third Division**	3	46	13	17	16	55	68	-13	56	**19th of 24**			R4	3-0-1	R2	1-2-1			5,232
1982–83	**Football League**; **Third Division**	3	46	9	11	26	57	97	-40	38	**23rd of 24**; Relegated			R2	1-0-1	R1	0-1-1			3,517
1983–84	**Football League**; **Fourth Division**	4	46	24	13	9	82	54	+28	85	**2nd of 24**; Promoted			R1	0-0-1	R2	1-1-2	AQF	2-0-1	3,747
1984–85	**Football League**; **Third Division**	3	46	17	8	21	72	74	-2	59	**14th of 24**			R4	3-0-1	R1	0-0-2	R1	0-1-1	4,147
1985–86	**Football League**; **Third Division**	3	46	16	16	14	45	52	-7	64	**11th of 24**			R1	0-0-1	R1	1-0-1	G	1-0-2	2,822
1986–87	**Football League**; **Third Division**	3	46	14	15	17	56	62	-6	57	**13th of 24**			R2	1-1-1	R1	0-1-1	G	0-1-1	2,402
1987–88	**Football League**; **Third Division**	3	46	8	9	29	40	84	-44	33	**24th of 24**; Relegated			R1	0-1-1	R2	1-0-3	G	0-0-2	1,893
1988–89	**Football League**; **Fourth Division**	4	46	13	10	23	49	78	-29	49	**23rd of 24**			R2	1-1-1	R1	0-1-1	G	0-1-1	2,163
1989–90	**Football League**; **Fourth Division**	4	46	14	9	23	53	60	-7	51	**20th of 24**			R2	1-0-1	R1	0-1-1	AF	4-2-1	2,710
1990–91	**Football League**; **Fourth Division**	4	46	17	14	15	56	46	+10	65	**11th of 24**			R1	0-1-1	R1	0-0-2	R1	1-2-0	2,836
1991–92	**Football League**; **Fourth Division**	4	42	9	8	25	40	65	-25	35	**21st of 24**			R1	0-1-1	R1	0-0-2	G	0-1-1	2,052
Football League divisions renamed after the Premier League creation.
1992–93	**Football League**; **Third Division**	4	42	11	14	17	42	57	-15	47	**16th of 24**			R1	0-0-1	R1	0-1-1	R2	1-0-2	2,417
1993–94	**Football League**; **Third Division**	4	42	14	10	18	44	57	-13	52	**15th of 24**			R1	0-1-1	R1	0-1-1	G	0-0-2	2,485
1994–95	**Football League**; **Third Division**	4	42	17	10	15	58	43	+15	61	**9th of 24**			R1	0-0-1	R1	0-1-1	R2	2-0-1	2,591
1995–96	**Football League**; **Third Division**	4	46	16	11	19	49	60	-11	59	**13th of 24**			R1	0-0-1	R1	0-2-0	R2	0-2-1	2,090
1996–97	**Football League**; **Third Division**	4	46	14	10	22	52	66	-14	52	**19th of 24**	Colin Cramb	18	R1	0-0-1	R1	0-1-1	R1	0-0-1	2,088
**1997–98**	**Football League**; **Third Division**	4	46	4	8	34	30	113	-83	20	**24th of 24**; Relegated	Prince Moncrieffe	8	R1	0-0-1	R1	0-0-2	R1	0-0-1	1,715
1998–99	**Football Conference**	5	42	12	12	18	51	55	-4	48	**16th of 24**			R2	3-1-1			R2	0-0-1	3,380
1999–2000	**Football Conference**	5	42	15	9	18	46	48	-2	54	**12th of 24**	Dino Maamria	7	R1	1-0-1			R4	2-1-1	2,909
2000–01	**Football Conference**	5	42	15	13	14	47	43	+4	58	**9th of 24**	Jamie Paterson	9	QR4	0-1-1			R2 (FLT); R3 (FAT)	1-0-1; 0-0-1	2,281
2001–02	**Football Conference**	5	42	18	13	11	68	46	+22	67	**4th of 24**	Jamie Paterson	14	R1	1-0-1			R1 (FLT); R4 (FAT)	0-0-1; 1-1-1	2,409
2002–03	**Football Conference**	5	42	22	12	8	73	47	+26	78	**3rd of 24**	Paul Barnes	25	R1	1-0-1			AQF (FLT); R3 (FAT)	2-0-1; 0-0-1	3,540
2002–03	**Football Conference**	5	Promoted after winning the play-offs.											R1	1-0-1			AQF (FLT); R3 (FAT)	2-0-1; 0-0-1	3,540
2003–04	**Football League**; **Third Division**	4	46	27	11	8	79	37	+42	92	**1st of 24**; Promoted	Gregg Blundell	18	R1	0-0-1	R2	1-0-1	R2	1-0-1	6,939
Football League divisions renamed.
2004–05	**Football**; **League One**	3	46	16	18	12	65	60	+5	66	**10th of 24**	Michael McIndoe	10	R2	1-0-1	R3	2-0-1	R2	1-1-0	6,886
2005–06	**Football**; **League One**	3	46	20	9	17	55	51	+4	69	**8th of 24**	Michael McIndoe	8	R3	2-0-1	QF	3-2-0	R2	1-0-1	6,139
2006–07	**Football**; **League One**	3	46	16	15	15	52	47	+5	63	**11th of 24**	Paul Heffernan	11	R3	2-1-1	R3	1-2-0	W	6-1-0	7,746
**2007–08**	**Football**; **League One**	3	46	23	11	12	65	41	+24	80	**3rd of 24**	James Hayter; Paul Heffernan; Jason Price	7	R1	0-1-1	R2	1-0-1	AQF	2-1-0	7,978
**2007–08**	**Football**; **League One**	3	Promoted after winning the play-offs.											R1	0-1-1	R2	1-0-1	AQF	2-1-0	7,978
**2008–09**	**Football League**; **Championship**	2	46	17	7	22	42	53	-11	58	**14th of 24**	Paul Heffernan	10	R4	1-2-1	R1	0-0-1			11,964
**2009–10**	**Football League**; **Championship**	2	46	15	15	16	59	58	+1	60	**12th of 24**	Billy Sharp	15	R4	1-0-1	R2	1-0-1			10,992
**2010–11**	**Football League**; **Championship**	2	46	11	15	20	55	81	-26	48	**21st of 24**	Billy Sharp	15	R3	0-1-1	R1	0-0-1			10,258
**2011–12**	**Football League**; **Championship**	2	46	8	12	26	43	80	-37	36	**24th of 24**; Relegated	Billy Sharp	10	R3	0-0-1	R2	1-0-1			9,341
**2012–13**	**Football**; **League One**	3	46	25	9	12	62	44	+18	84	**1st of 24**; Promoted	Billy Paynter	13	R2	1-0-1	R3	1-1-1	AQF	1-1-0	7,239
**2013–14**	**Football League**; **Championship**	2	46	11	11	24	39	70	-31	44	**22nd of 24**; Relegated	Chris Brown	9	R3	0-0-1	R2	1-0-1			9,041
**2014–15**	**Football**; **League One**	3	46	16	13	17	58	62	-4	61	**13th of 24**	Nathan Tyson	12	R3	2-1-1	R3	2-0-1	AQF	1-0-1	6,807
**2015–16**	**Football**; **League One**	3	46	11	13	22	48	64	-16	46	**21st of 24**; Relegated	Andy Williams	12	R3	2-0-1	R2	0-1-1	R2	0-1-1	6,553
**2016–17**	**Football**; **League Two**	4	46	25	10	11	85	55	+30	85	**3rd of 24**; Promoted	John Marquis	26	R1	0-0-1	R1	0-0-1	R2	1-3-0	6,021
**2017–18**	**Football**; **League One**	3	46	13	17	16	52	52	0	56	**15th of 24**	John Marquis	14	R3	2-0-1	R3	2-0-1	R2	1-3-0	8,213
**2018–19**	**Football**; **League One**	3	46	20	13	13	76	58	+18	73	**6th of 24**	John Marquis	21	R5	4-1-1	R2	1-0-1	G	1-0-2	8,098
**2018–19**	**Football**; **League One**	3	Lost in the **play-off** semifinal.											R5	4-1-1	R2	1-0-1	G	1-0-2	8,098
**2019–20**	**Football**; **League One**	3	34	15	9	10	51	33	+18	54	**9th of 24**	Kieran Sadlier	11	R2	1-1-1	R1	0-0-1	R2	1-0-3	8,252
**2019–20**	**Football**; **League One**	3	Final league positions decided by Points-Per-Game after league was postponed due to COVID-19											R2	1-1-1	R1	0-0-1	R2	1-0-3	8,252
**2020–21**	**Football**; **League One**	3	46	19	7	20	63	67	-4	64	**14th of 24**	Fejiri Okenabirhie	11	R4	3-0-1	R1	0-0-1	G	0-1-2	– (Note: COVID-19 prevented fans from attending games)
**2021–22**	**Football**; **League One**	3	46	10	8	28	37	82	-45	38	**22nd of 24**; Relegated	Tommy Rowe	7	R2	1-0-1	R2	0-1-1	R2	2-0-2	6,906
**2022–23**	**Football**; **League Two**	4	46	16	7	23	46	65	-13	55	**18th of 24**	George Miller	11	R1	0-0-1	R1	0-0-1	GS	1-1-1	6,500
**2023–24**	**Football**; **League Two**	4	46	21	8	17	73	68	+5	71	**5th of 24**	Joe Ironside	20	R2	1-1-1	R2	1-0-1	QF	3-2-1	7,090
**2023–24**	**Football**; **League Two**	4	Lost in the **play-off** semifinal.											R2	1-1-1	R2	1-0-1	QF	3-2-1	7,090
**2024-25**	**Football**; **League Two**	4	46	24	12	10	73	50	+23	84	**1st of 24** Promoted	Luke Molyneux	16	R4	2-1-1	R2	1-0-1	R32	2-1-1	8,014
**2025-2026**	**Football**; **League One**	3	46	17	9	20	50	69	−19	60	**14th of 24**	Owen Bailey	13	R3	2-0-1	R3	2-0-1	SF	5-1-1	9,073
