= Barry Thornley =

English footballer

Personal information
- Full name: Barry Edward Thornley
- Date of birth: 11 February 1948 (age 78)
- Place of birth: Gravesend, England
- Positions: Left winger; left back

Senior career*
Years	Team	Apps	(Gls)
1964–1965	Gravesend & Northfleet	18	(3)
1965–1967	Brentford	7	(0)
1967–1969	Oxford United	23	(4)
1969–1973	Chelmsford City	128	(20)
1973	→ Ramsgate (loan)	8	
1973–1975	Dover		(8)
1975–1977	Margate	109	(5)
- * Club domestic league appearances and goals

Barry Edward Thornley (born 11 February 1948) is an English retired professional footballer who played as a winger and full back in the Football League for Brentford and Oxford United. He later made over 200 appearances in a four-year spell at Chelmsford City.

== Playing career ==
=== Gravesend & Northfleet ===
A left winger, Thornley began his career at hometown Southern League First Division club Gravesend & Northfleet. He made 18 appearances and scored three goals during the 1964–65 season, before departing in October 1965.

=== Brentford ===
In October 1965, Thornley moved to the Football League to sign for Third Division strugglers Brentford for a £2,000 fee. He initially played for the reserve team and was the first substitute to be utilised for the team, when he replaced Phil Basey in a Combination Cup tie against Bristol City that month. Thornley had failed to make a first team appearance at all during the 1966–67 season and instead played for the reserves, experiencing some joy by winning the London Challenge Cup with the club. He managed just seven first team appearances for the financially stricken club and was released at the end of the 1966–67 season.

=== Oxford United ===
Thornley joined Third Division club Oxford United in June 1967. He made something of a breakthrough into the first team, making 19 appearances, scoring three goals and winning silverware, with the Us securing promotion to Second Division by winning the Third Division title. Playing in the second-tier for the first time, Thornley made just four appearances in the 1968–69 season and departed the club at the end of the campaign. Thornley made 26 appearances and scored four goals during his time at the Manor Ground.

=== Chelmsford City ===
Thornley dropped into non-League football in 1969 and signed for Southern League Premier Division club Chelmsford City. He had a good first season, making 39 appearances, scoring seven goals and winning the club's Player of the Year award, in addition to the Essex Professional Cup. Thornley made 35 league appearances and scored three goals during the 1970–71 season and won another Essex Professional Cup. He finally tasted league title success in the 1971–72 season, though the Clarets were denied election to the Football League.

Thornley played on until the end of the 1972–73 season, making only 20 appearances, but winning the Essex Professional Floodlight Cup. Thornley joined Southern League Premier Division club Ramsgate on loan towards the end of the 1972–73 season and made eight appearances without scoring. He departed the New Writtle Street Stadium having made 210 appearances and scored 31 goals in his four years with Chelmsford.

=== Dover ===
Thornley transferred to Southern League Premier Division club Dover during the 1973 off-season for a £1,000 fee. He scored 13 goals during his two seasons with the club.

=== Margate ===
Thornley joined Southern League Premier Division club Margate during the 1975 off-season. Despite the team's indifferent form in the league, he had a good first season playing at left back, making 61 appearances, scoring two goals and winning the Kent Floodlight Trophy. The Gate had a disastrous 1976–77 season, culminating in relegation to the Southern League First Division South, which prompted Thornley's retirement from football.

== Personal life ==
In later life, Thornley worked for Liverpool Victoria.

== Career statistics ==
Appearances and goals by club, season and competition
Club	Season	League			FA Cup		League Cup		Total	
Club	Season	Division	Apps	Goals	Apps	Goals	Apps	Goals	Apps	Goals
Brentford	1965–66	Third Division	7	0	0	0	0	0	7	0
Oxford United	1967–68	Third Division	19	3	1	0	2	0	22	3
Oxford United	1968–69	Second Division	4	1	0	0	0	0	4	1
Oxford United	Total		23	4	1	0	2	0	26	4
Career total			30	4	1	0	2	0	33	4

== Honours ==
Brentford

- London Challenge Cup: 1964–65

Oxford United

- Football League Third Division: 1967–68

Chelmsford City

- Southern League Premier Division: 1971–72
- Essex Professional Cup: 1969–70, 1970–71
- Essex Professional Floodlight Cup: 1972–73

Margate

- Kent Floodlight Trophy: 1975–76

Individual

- Chelmsford City Player of the Year: 1969–70
