= Hamish McKenzie =

Hamish McKenzie may refer to:

- Hamish McKenzie (cyclist)
- Hamish McKenzie (cricketer)
- Hamish McKenzie, Substack (online subscription newsletter platform) co-founder

== See also ==
- Hamish MacKenzie, Scottish footballer
