= Hugh McLaughlin (footballer, born 1943) =

Scottish footballer (1943–2019)

Personal information
- Full name: Hugh McLaughlin
- Date of birth: 2 September 1943
- Place of birth: Glasgow, Scotland
- Date of death: 21 June 2019 (aged 75)
- Place of death: Kirkintilloch, Scotland
- Position: Wing half

Youth career
- –1961: St Roch's

Senior career*
Years	Team	Apps	(Gls)
1961–1966	Brentford	5	(0)
- Gravesend & Northfleet
- * Club domestic league appearances and goals

Hugh McLaughlin (2 September 1943 – 21 June 2019) was a Scottish professional footballer who played in the Football League for Brentford as a wing half.

== Career ==
=== Brentford ===
McLaughlin began his career at Scottish junior club St Roch's and was signed by Scottish manager Malky McDonald of English Third Division club Brentford in September 1961. McLaughlin made only seven first team appearances during a five-year spell at Griffin Park and scored once, in a League Cup match versus Reading in September 1963. After substitutions were introduced in the Football League in 1965, McLaughlin was the first Brentford player to come on as a substitute, when he replaced Billy Cobb after 41 minutes of a 2–0 win over Oldham Athletic on 11 April 1964. He spent much of his time in the Brentford reserves and won the 1964–65 London Challenge Cup with the team. McLaughlin departed Griffin Park at the end of the 1965–66 season.

=== Gravesend & Northfleet ===
After his release from Brentford, McLaughlin dropped into non-League football and transferred to Southern League First Division club Gravesend & Northfleet prior to the beginning of the 1966–67 season.

== Personal life ==
McLaughlin's grandnephew Aaron Hickey also became a professional footballer and signed for Brentford in 2022.

== Career statistics ==
Appearances and goals by club, season and competition
Club	Season	League			FA Cup		League Cup		Total	
Club	Season	Division	Apps	Goals	Apps	Goals	Apps	Goals	Apps	Goals
Brentford	1963–64	Third Division	2	0	0	0	2	1	4	1
Brentford	1964–65	Third Division	2	0	0	0	0	0	2	0
Brentford	1965–66	Third Division	1	0	0	0	0	0	1	0
Career total			5	0	0	0	2	1	7	1

== Honours ==
Brentford Reserves

- London Challenge Cup: 1964–65
