= Oxspring (surname) =

Oxspring is a surname of English origin, possibly derived from Oxspring, a village and civil parish in the Metropolitan Borough of Barnsley in South Yorkshire. People with that name include:

- Arnold Oxspring (c. 1876 – after 1911), English footballer
- Bobby Oxspring (1919–1989), Royal Air Force officer and flying ace of the Second World War
- Chris Oxspring (born 1977), Australian baseball pitcher and coach
