= Ron Still =

Scottish footballer

Personal information
- Full name: Ronald George Still
- Date of birth: 10 June 1943 (age 83)
- Place of birth: Aberdeen, Scotland
- Position: Centre forward

Youth career
- Woodside
- 1961–1965: Arsenal

Senior career*
| Years | Team | Apps | (Gls) |
| 1965–1967 | Notts County | 46 | (14) |
| 1967 | Brentford | 1 | (0) |
| 1967 | Margate | 5 | (1) |
- * Club domestic league appearances and goals

Ronald George Still (born 10 June 1943) is a Scottish retired professional footballer who played in the Football League for Notts County and Brentford as a centre forward. He top-scored for Notts County in the 1965–66 season.

== Personal life ==
Still's twin grandsons Matthew and Michael are both professional footballers.

== Career statistics ==
Appearances and goals by club, season and competition
| Club | Season | League | | | FA Cup | | League Cup | | Total | |
| Club | Season | Division | Apps | Goals | Apps | Goals | Apps | Goals | Apps | Goals |
|---|---|---|---|---|---|---|---|---|---|---|
| Notts County | 1965–66 | Fourth Division | 34 | 12 | 0 | 0 | 0 | 0 | 34 | 12 |
| Notts County | 1966–67 | Fourth Division | 12 | 2 | 0 | 0 | 0 | 0 | 12 | 2 |
| Notts County | Total | | 46 | 14 | 0 | 0 | 0 | 0 | 46 | 14 |
| Brentford | 1967–68 | Fourth Division | 1 | 0 | — | | 0 | 0 | 1 | 0 |
| Margate | 1967–68 | Southern League Premier Division | 5 | 1 | 1 | 0 | — | | 6 | 1 |
| Career total | | | 52 | 15 | 1 | 0 | 0 | 0 | 53 | 15 |
