= Cliff Myers =

English footballer (1946–2019)

Personal information
- Full name: Clifford William Myers
- Date of birth: 23 September 1946
- Place of birth: Southwark, England
- Date of death: 8 February 2019 (aged 72)
- Place of death: Lindos, Greece
- Position: Utility player

Senior career*
| Years | Team | Apps | (Gls) |
| 1965–1967 | Charlton Athletic | 18 | (2) |
| 1967–1968 | Brentford | 10 | (0) |
| 1968–1973 | Yeovil Town | 328 | (49) |
| 1973–1975 | Torquay United | 86 | (12) |
| 1975–1976 | Weymouth (loan) | | |
| 1976–1977 | Salisbury | | (2) |
- Taunton Town
- Minehead
- * Club domestic league appearances and goals

Clifford William Myers (23 September 1946 – 8 February 2019) was an English professional footballer who played in the Football League for Torquay United, Charlton Athletic and Brentford as a utility player. He went on to have a long career in non-League football and is regarded as a cult hero amongst the supporters of Yeovil Town, for whom he made 329 appearances.

== Personal life ==
Myers' son and grandson (Chris and Spencer respectively) both became footballers. Myers began running a Torquay-based contract cleaning company in the late 1970s and moved to Rhodes in 1991. He owned the Sunburnt Arms bar in Lindos.

== Career statistics ==
Appearances and goals by club, season and competition
| Club | Season | League | | | FA Cup | | League Cup | | Total | |
| Club | Season | Division | Apps | Goals | Apps | Goals | Apps | Goals | Apps | Goals |
|---|---|---|---|---|---|---|---|---|---|---|
| Brentford | 1967–68 | Fourth Division | 10 | 0 | 2 | 2 | 1 | 0 | 13 | 2 |
| Career total | | | 10 | 0 | 2 | 2 | 1 | 0 | 13 | 2 |

== Honours ==
Yeovil Town

- Southern League Premier Division: 1970–71
