= Bobby Wilson (footballer, born 1944) =

English footballer

Personal information
- Full name: Robert Wilson
- Date of birth: 29 May 1944 (age 82)
- Place of birth: Oxford, England
- Position: Inside forward

Senior career*
Years	Team	Apps	(Gls)
–1967	Feltham		
1967	Brentford	1	(1)
1967	Walton & Hersham		
1967–1971	Hendon	125	(62)
1971–1972	Hayes	6	(3)
- * Club domestic league appearances and goals

Robert Wilson (born 29 May 1944) is an English retired amateur footballer who made one appearance in the Football League for Brentford as an inside forward. He is best remembered for his four seasons in non-League football with Hendon, for whom he made over 180 appearances.

== Honours ==
Hendon

- London Senior Cup: 1968–69

== Career statistics ==
Appearances and goals by club, season and competition
Club	Season	League			FA Cup		League Cup		Other		Total	
Club	Season	Division	Apps	Goals	Apps	Goals	Apps	Goals	Apps	Goals	Apps	Goals
Brentford	1966–67	Fourth Division	1	1	—		—		—		1	1
Hendon	1967–68	Isthmian League	36	18	1		—		8 (Note: 3 appearances in Middlesex Senior Cup, 2 appearances in London Challenge Cup, 2 appearances in London Senior Cup, 1 appearance in FA Amateur Cup.)		45	19
Hendon	1968–69	Isthmian League	33	20	3	1	—		12 (Note: 5 appearances and 1 goal in London Senior Cup, 4 appearances and 1 goal in FA Amateur Cup, 3 appearances and two goals in Middlesex Senior Cup.)	4	48	25
Hendon	1969–70	Isthmian League	24	9	7	3	—		15 (Note: 5 appearances and 2 goals in FA Amateur Cup, 4 appearances and 2 goals in London Senior Cup, 3 appearances in London Charity Cup, 2 appearances and 1 goal in Middlesex Senior Cup, 1 appearance in Eastbourne Charity Cup.)	9	46	18
Hendon	1970–71	Isthmian League	32	15	3		—		7 (Note: 4 appearances in Middlesex Senior Cup, 2 appearances and 1 goal in FA Amateur Cup, 1 appearance in London Senior Cup.)	2	42	18
Hendon	Total		125	62	14	4	—		42	15	181	81
Career total			126	63	14	4	—		42	15	182	82
