= George Thomson (footballer, born 1936) =

Scottish footballer (1936–2007)

Personal information
- Full name: George Matthewson Thomson
- Date of birth: 19 October 1936
- Place of birth: Edinburgh, Scotland
- Date of death: July 2007 (aged 70)
- Place of death: Lancashire, England
- Position: Utility player

Youth career
- Edinburgh City
- 1953–1957: Heart of Midlothian

Senior career*
Years	Team	Apps	(Gls)
1957–1960	Heart of Midlothian	117	(14)
1960–1963	Everton	73	(1)
1963–1968	Brentford	162	(5)
Total		352	(20)

International career
- Scotland Schoolboys
- Scotland U23
1959–1960	Scottish League XI	2	(0)
- * Club domestic league appearances and goals

George Matthewson Thomson (19 October 1936 – July 2007) was a Scottish professional footballer who played for Heart of Midlothian, Everton and Brentford as a utility player. He was capped by Scotland at schoolboy and U23 levels and made two appearances for the Scottish League XI.

== Career ==
=== Heart of Midlothian ===
Thomson began his career with Edinburgh City and joined Scottish League club Heart of Midlothian in April 1953. He had to wait until February 1957 to make his debut, which came in a 1–1 First Division draw with Falkirk. He went on to make six further appearances during the 1956–57 season and was thereafter a regular in the team until his departure in November 1960. He was a fixture in Hearts' 1957–58 and 1959–60 First Division title-winning teams and featured as an ever-present in the latter triumph. He also played in both the 1958 and 1959 Scottish League Cup-winning campaigns. Thomson made 161 appearances and scored 17 goals during three-and-a-half years as a first team player at Hearts.

=== Everton ===
Thomson and Heart of Midlothian teammate Alex Young moved south to join English First Division club Everton for a combined £55,000 fee on 26 November 1960. Thomson was unable to hold a regular place in the team during his 2 1/2 seasons with the club, but he managed to make 20 appearances during the club's championship-winning season in 1962–63. He made 77 appearances and scored one goal for the club before departing Goodison Park in late 1963.

=== Brentford ===
Thomson joined newly-promoted Third Division club Brentford November 1963 and stayed at Griffin Park for 4 1/2 years, before retiring at the end of the 1967–68 season. Thomson made 179 appearances and scored five goals for Brentford.

== International and representative career ==
Thomson represented Scotland at schoolboy and U23 level. While with Hearts, he made two appearances for the Scottish League XI against the Irish League XI.

== Personal life ==
Thomson attended Craiglockhart Primary School, Tynecastle High School and Slateford School. As a player, he was nicknamed "007", because of his looks.

== Career statistics ==
Appearances and goals by club, season and competition
Club	Season	League			National cup (Note: Includes Scottish Cup, FA Cup)		League cup (Note: Includes Scottish League Cup, Football League Cup)		Europe		Other		Total	
Club	Season	Division	Apps	Goals	Apps	Goals	Apps	Goals	Apps	Goals	Apps	Goals	Apps	Goals
Heart of Midlothian	1956–57	Scottish First Division	7	0	0	0	0	0	—		1 (Note: Appearance in East of Scotland Shield)	0	8	0
Heart of Midlothian	1957–58	Scottish First Division	30	0	3	0	2	0	—		—		35	0
Heart of Midlothian	1958–59	Scottish First Division	34	10	2	0	10	1	2 (Note: Appearances in European Cup)	0	1	0	49	11
Heart of Midlothian	1959–60	Scottish First Division	34	4	2	0	10	1	—		1	0	47	5
Heart of Midlothian	1960–61	Scottish First Division	12	0	—		7	1	2	0	1	0	22	1
Heart of Midlothian	Total		117	14	7	0	29	3	4	0	4	0	161	17
Everton	1960–61	First Division	22	0	0	0	2	0	—		—		24	0
Everton	1961–62	First Division	32	1	1	0	0	0	—		—		33	1
Everton	1962–63	First Division	19	0	—		0	0	1 (Note: Appearance in Inter-Cities Fairs Cup)	0	—		20	0
Everton	Total		73	1	1	0	2	0	1	0	—		77	1
Brentford	1963–64	Third Division	23	1	4	0	—		—		—		27	1
Brentford	1964–65	Third Division	41	0	4	0	1	0	—		—		46	0
Brentford	1965–66	Third Division	44	2	1	0	2	0	—		—		47	2
Brentford	1966–67	Fourth Division	25	0	3	0	0	0	—		—		28	0
Brentford	1967–68	Fourth Division	29	2	2	0	0	0	—		—		31	2
Brentford	Total		162	5	14	0	3	0	—		—		179	5
Career total			352	20	22	0	34	3	5	0	4	0	417	23

== Honours ==
Heart of Midlothian

- Scottish League First Division: 1957–58, 1959–60
- Scottish League Cup: 1958–59, 1959–60
- East of Scotland Shield: 1957–58, 1959–60

Everton

- Football League First Division: 1962–63
