= List of Doncaster Rovers F.C. records and statistics =

Doncaster Rovers is an English football club formed in 1879.

== Honours ==
=== League ===
English third tier
Champions: 2012–13
Play-off winners: 2007–08
— Northern half
— Champions: 1934–35, 1946–47, 1949–50
— Runners up: 1937–38, 1938–39

English fourth tier
Champions: 1965–66, 1968–69, 2003–04 2024-25
Runners up: 1983–84 Promoted: 1980–81, 2016–17

English fifth tier
Play-Off Winners: 2002–03

Midland Football League
Champions: 1896–97, 1898–99
Runners up: 1900–01, 1922–23

Midland Alliance League
Runners up: 1890–91

Yorkshire League
Runners up: 1898–99

=== Cup ===
Football League Trophy
2006–07

Sheffield and Hallamshire Senior Cup
1890–91, 1911–12, 2000–01, 2001–02

Sheffield and Hallamshire County Cup
1935–36, 1937–38, 1940–41, 1955–56, 1967–68, 1975–76, 1985–86

Conference Cup
1998–99, 1999–2000

Wharncliffe Charity Cup
1922–23

== Club ==
- Highest overall League finish: 7th (25th overall), Division 2, 1901–02 season
- Record League victory: 10–0 v Darlington, Division 4, 25 January 1964
- Record cup victory: 7–0 v Blyth Spartans, FA Cup first round, 27 November 1937 and v Chorley, FA Cup first round replay, 20 November 2018.
- Record defeat: 0–12 v Small Heath, Division 2, 11 April 1903
- Record home attendance at Belle Vue: 37,149 v Hull City, Division 3 (N), 2 October 1948
- Record home attendance at Keepmoat Stadium: 15,001 vs Leeds Utd, League 1, 1 April 2008
- Record League points: 92, Division 3, 2003–04
- Record League goals: 123, Division 3 (N), 1946–47
- Longest match: 3 hours 23 minutes (203 minutes) v Stockport County, 30 March 1946, also a world record.

== Players ==
=== Appearances ===
- Record League appearances: James Coppinger, 607
- Record appearances: James Coppinger, 688
- Most consecutive League appearances: Bert Tindill, 139 (11 September 1948 – 24 November 1951)
- Longest serving: Walter Langton, 18 seasons

=== Goalscorers ===
A list of goalscorers who have scored 40 or more total goals. Ordered by total goals, then league goals, then ratios.

As of 5 April 2021.

#	Name	Position	Club career	League apps	League goals	League ratio	Total apps	Total goals	Total ratio	Notes
1	Tom Keetley	FW	1923–1929	231	180	0.779	241	186	0.772	
2	Alick Jeffrey	FW	1954–1959, 1963–1968	262	129	0.492	293	140	0.478	
3	Bert Tindill	IF	1946–1958	402	122	0.303	429	131	0.305	Also scored 13 goals in the Wartime League and 3 in Wartime Cup games
4	Peter Kitchen	FW	1970–1977	228	90	0.395	256	106	0.414	
5	James Coppinger	MF	2004–2021	607	67	0.11	688	78	0.113	
6	Brendan O'Callaghan	FW	1973–1978	187	64	0.342	212	77	0.363	
7	John Marquis	FW	2016–2019	134	61	0.455	153	67	0.438	
8	Billy Linward	OL	1895–1901		53			65		
9	Glynn Snodin	MF	1976–1985	309	59	0.191	345	62	0.18	
10	Colin Booth	IF	1962–1964	88	57	0.648	101	62	0.614	
11	Colin Douglas	FW /FB	1981–1986, 1988–1993	404	53	0.131	444	62	0.14	
12	Billy Boardman	FW	1922–1927	182	57	0.313	196	61	0.311	
13	Peter Doherty	IF	1949–1953	103	55	0.534	109	58	0.532	
14	William Jex	Inside Left	1908–09 1910–11 1913–14		49			58		
15	Arnold Oxspring	Inside Right / Outside Right	1897–1900		51			56		
16	Paul Todd	IF	1946–1950	160	49	0.306	170	56	0.329	
17	Stan "Dizzie" Burton	WI	1932–1938	196	50	0.255	204	54	0.265	
18	Albert Turner	WI	1933–1937	119	51	0.429	122	53	0.434	Scored in 6 consecutive games and 5 times in one game in 1934-35 season
19	Clarrie Jordan	FW	1940–1948	60	48	0.8	67	50	0.746	He also scored 63 goals in 102 games during the war years
20	Ray Harrison	CF	1950–1954	126	47	0.373	134	50	0.373	
21	Kit Lawlor	IF	1950–1954	127	47	0.37	143	49	0.343	
22	Ron Walker	LW	1952–1961	240	46	0.192	258	49	0.19	
23	Laurie Sheffield	CF	1965–1966, 1969	73	41	0.562	85	48	0.565	
24	Walter Langton	LB / CF	1887–1905		28			48		
25	Tony Leighton	CF	1959–1961	84	44	0.524	88	45	0.511	
26	Billy Sharp	FW	2009–2012, 2014	98	44	0.449	102	45	0.441	
27	Eddie Perry	CF	1936–1940	98	44	0.449	102	44	0.431	
28	Reg Baines	CF	1934–1936	80	43	0.538	81	43	0.531	
29	Alfie Hale	IF	1962–1965	119	42	0.353	135	44	0.326	
30	Paul Heffernan	FW	2005–2010	128	35	0.273	150	43	0.287	
31	Albert Broadbent	LW	1959–1961 1963-1966	206	39	0.189	231	42	0.182	

- Record League goal-scorer: Tom Keetley, 180 league goals (1923 to 1929)
- Record goal-scorer: Tom Keetley, 186 goals in all competitions
- Highest League scorer in a season: Clarrie Jordan, 42 (Division 3 (N), 1946–47)
- Most goals in one match: Tom Keetley, 6 (in 7–4 league win at Ashington, 1928–29)
- Scoring in most consecutive games: Clarrie Jordan, 10 (1946–47)
- Most goals scored in their debut: Arnold Oxspring, 4 against Long Eaton Rangers in the Midland League

=== Other ===
- Most international caps while at Rovers: Len Graham (14 caps for Northern Ireland)
- Youngest player: Alick Jeffrey (15 years, 229 days, 1954)
- Oldest player: John Ryan (52 years and 11 months, 2003)
- Record transfer fee paid: Billy Sharp £1,150,000 (to Sheffield United)
- Record fee received: Matthew Mills, £2,000,000 (from Reading)

== Inclusion criteria ==
Statistics includes substitute appearances, but excludes wartime matches. Further information on competitions/seasons which are regarded as eligible for general statistics are provided below.

=== League stats ===
League statistics includes data for the following league spells, but not play-off matches:

- Midland Alliance: 1890−91
- Midland Football League: 1891-92 to 1900-01; 1903–04; 1905-06 to 1922-23
- The Yorkshire League: 1897−98 to 1898−99
- Football League: 1901-02 to 1902-03; 1904–05; 1923-24 to 1997-98; 2003-04 to present
- Football Conference: 1998-99 to 2002-03

=== Total stats ===
The figures for total statistics includes the League figures together with the following competitions:

- Play-off matches (2002–03 and 2007–08)
- FA Cup; FA Trophy (1998-99 to 2002-03)
- Football League Cup, Football League Trophy (including three seasons as a Conference club 2000-01 to 2002-03), Football League Group Cup (1982–83), Football League Third Division North Cup (1933-34 to 1934-35; 1937–38)
- Conference League Cup (1999-00 to 2000-01)
- Sheffield and Hallamshire FA Minor Challenge Cup
- Sheffield and Hallamshire FA Senior Challenge Cup
- Gainsborough News Charity Cup
- Wharncliffe Charity Cup
- Mexborough Montague Charity Cup
- Friendlies (pre 1890−91 when Doncaster weren't in a league)

NOT included:

- Wartime League matches
- Friendlies (1890−91 onwards)
