= Billy Gray (footballer) =

English footballer (1927–2011)

Personal information
- Full name: William Patrick Gray
- Date of birth: 24 May 1927
- Place of birth: Dinnington, England
- Date of death: 11 April 2011 (aged 83)
- Place of death: Aspley, England
- Positions: Forward; left back

Senior career*
Years	Team	Apps	(Gls)
–1947	Dinnington Colliery		
1947–1948	Leyton Orient	19	(1)
1948–1953	Chelsea	146	(12)
1953–1957	Burnley	120	(30)
1957–1963	Nottingham Forest	201	(29)
1963–1965	Millwall	20	(1)
Total		506	(73)

International career
1950	England B	1	(1)

Managerial career
- 1963–1966: Millwall
- 1966–1967: Brentford
- 1967–1968: Notts County
- * Club domestic league appearances and goals

William Patrick Gray (24 May 1927 – 11 April 2011) was an English professional footballer and manager who made over 500 Football League appearances in a variety of positions for Nottingham Forest, Chelsea, Burnley, Millwall and Leyton Orient. He began his short management career while still a player with Millwall and later managed Brentford and Notts County. Gray was capped by England B at international level.

== Club career ==
An outside right, Gray began his career with hometown Newcastle & District League club Dinnington Colliery and got his start in league football with Third Division South club Leyton Orient in May 1947. He failed to make an impact at Brisbane Road, but made a surprise transfer to First Division club Chelsea for a nominal fee in March 1949. Gray made 172 appearances and scored 14 goals in just over four seasons at Stamford Bridge, before moving to First Division rivals Burnley for a £16,000 fee in August 1953. He made 130 appearances and scored 32 goals during four seasons at Turf Moor.

At age 30, Gray transferred to top-flight club Nottingham Forest for a £4,500 fee in June 1957. In 1958, manager Billy Walker moved Gray from outside to inside forward and he became the team's playmaker and penalty taker, scoring three penalties in Forest's run to the 1959 FA Cup Final and setting up Tommy Wilson's winning goal in the 2–1 victory in the final over Luton Town. Over time, Gray was moved to left back and proved effective in the position, before departing the City Ground at age 36 in November 1963. In six seasons with Forest, Gray made 228 appearances and scored 35 goals. He moved to Third Division strugglers Millwall as player-manager in November 1963 and after the club's relegation to the Fourth Division at the end of the 1963–64 season, he played a bit-part role as a player in the Lions' immediate return to the Third Division at the first attempt. Gray retired at the end of the 1964–65 season. He made a brief comeback for Brentford Reserves in early 1967.

== International career ==
Gray won one cap for England B and scored in a 5–0 victory over Switzerland in January 1950.

== Managerial career ==
Gray took over Third Division strugglers Millwall as player-manager in November 1963 and despite relegation to the Fourth Division, he guided the club to successive promotions during the 1964–65 and 1965–66 seasons. A falling-out with the club's directors led to his departure from The Den in May 1966, after promotion had been secured. With five matches of the 1965–66 season still to play, Gray moved across London to take over as manager of Third Division strugglers Brentford, but failed to save the Bees from relegation to the Fourth Division. He kept the cash-strapped club afloat in mid-table for the majority of the 1966-67 season, before following chairman Jack Dunnett out of Griffin Park to Notts County in March 1967. He remained at Meadow Lane until September 1968.

== Coaching and other roles ==
After leaving football management in 1968, Gray later worked as a groundsman at Meadow Lane and the City Ground.

== Personal life ==
Gray was married and had five children. His nephew was John Richardson, whom he managed at Millwall and Brentford. On retirement from football management, Gray ran a grocers on Wollaton Road in Nottingham and he later ran a fish and chip shop in Beeston Rylands.

== Career statistics ==
=== Player ===
Appearances and goals by club, season and competition
Club	Season	League			FA Cup		League Cup		Europe		Other		Total	
Club	Season	Division	Apps	Goals	Apps	Goals	Apps	Goals	Apps	Goals	Apps	Goals	Apps	Goals
Chelsea	1948–49	First Division	2	0	—		—		—		—		2	0
Chelsea	1949–50	First Division	39	2	7	0	—		—		—		46	2
Chelsea	1950–51	First Division	31	6	5	0	—		—		—		36	6
Chelsea	1951–52	First Division	42	1	9	3	—		—		—		51	4
Chelsea	1952–53	First Division	32	3	5	0	—		—		—		37	3
Chelsea	Total		146	12	26	3	—		—		—		172	15
Burnley	1953–54	First Division	42	19	3	1	—		—		—		45	20
Burnley	1954–55	First Division	40	8	1	0	—		—		—		41	8
Burnley	1955–56	First Division	31	2	6	1	—		—		—		37	3
Burnley	1956–57	First Division	7	1	0	0	—		—		—		7	1
Burnley	Total		120	30	10	2	—		—		—		130	32
Nottingham Forest	1957–58	First Division	35	9	3	0	—		—		0	0	38	9
Nottingham Forest	1958–59	First Division	40	7	9	5	—		—		0	0	49	12
Nottingham Forest	1959–60	First Division	37	7	1	0	—		—		3 (Note: 2 appearances and 1 goal in Anglo-Scottish Cup, 1 appearance in FA Charity Shield)	1	41	8
Nottingham Forest	1960–61	First Division	30	3	1	0	2	0	—		1 (Note: Appearances in Notts Association Cup)	0	34	3
Nottingham Forest	1961–62	First Division	34	2	2	0	0	0	2 (Note: Appearances in Inter-Cities Fairs Cup)	0	2	0	40	2
Nottingham Forest	1962–63	First Division	25	1	1	0	0	0	—		0	0	26	1
Nottingham Forest	Total		201	29	17	5	2	0	2	0	6	1	228	35
Millwall	1963–64	Third Division	12	1	—		—		—		—		12	1
Millwall	1964–65	Fourth Division	8	0	0	0	1	0	—		—		9	0
Millwall	Total		20	1	0	0	1	0	—		—		21	1
Career total			487	71	53	10	3	0	2	0	6	1	551	83

=== Manager ===
Team	From	To	Record					Ref
Team	From	To	G	W	D	L	Win %	Ref
Millwall	1 November 1963	8 May 1966	138	68	40	30	49.28	
Brentford	2 May 1966	March 1967	42	15	12	15	35.71	
Notts County	March 1967	September 1968	51	15	13	23	29.41	
Total			231	98	65	68	42.42	—

== Honours ==
=== As a player ===
Nottingham Forest

- FA Cup: 1958–59

=== As a manager ===
Millwall

- Football League Third Division second-place promotion: 1965–66
- Football League Fourth Division second-place promotion: 1964–65

Brentford

- London Challenge Cup: 1966–67
