= Dennis Edwards (footballer) =

English professional footballer (1937–2019)

Personal information
- Full name: Dennis Edwards
- Date of birth: 19 January 1937
- Place of birth: Slough, England
- Date of death: 13 September 2019 (aged 82)
- Place of death: Portsmouth, England
- Height: 1.80 m (5 ft 11 in)
- Position: Inside forward

Youth career
- Old Paludians

Senior career*
Years	Team	Apps	(Gls)
1954–1957	Slough Town	35	(27)
1957–1959	Wycombe Wanderers	28	(31)
1959–1965	Charlton Athletic	171	(61)
1965–1968	Portsmouth	71	(14)
1967	→ Brentford (loan)	11	(2)
1968	Aldershot	14	(1)
Total		302	(105)

International career
1958	England Amateurs	2	(3)
- * Club domestic league appearances and goals

Dennis Edwards (19 January 1937 – 13 September 2019) was an English professional footballer who played as an inside forward in the Football League, most notably for Charlton Athletic, for whom he made over 170 appearances. He also played league football for Portsmouth, Brentford and Aldershot. Earlier in his career, Edwards was a prolific goalscorer in non-League football for Slough Town and Wycombe Wanderers and he was capped by England at amateur level.

== Personal life ==
Edwards was educated at the Lea School and Slough Grammar School. After leaving school he worked as a clerk for ICI and served his national service in the RAF. Edwards was a Brentford supporter. After retiring from football, he lived in Denmead and established a frozen food business.

== Career statistics ==
Appearances and goals by club, season and competition
Club	Season	League			FA Cup		League Cup		Other		Total	
Club	Season	Division	Apps	Goals	Apps	Goals	Apps	Goals	Apps	Goals	Apps	Goals
Slough Town	1954–55	Corinthian League	7	1	0	0	—		7 (Note: 4 appearances in Berks & Bucks Senior Cup, 3 appearances and 1 goal in Corinthian League Memorial Shield)	1	14	1
Slough Town	1955–56	Corinthian League	23	19	2	1	—		10 (Note: 4 appearances and 7 goals in Berks & Bucks Benevolent Cup, 4 appearances and 1 goal in Berks & Bucks Senior Cup, 1 appearance and 2 goals in Corinthian League Memorial Shield, 1 appearance and 1 goal in FA Amateur Cup)	11	35	31
Slough Town	1956–57	Corinthian League	5	7	0	0	—		3 (Note: 2 appearances and 1 goal in Berks & Bucks Benevolent Cup, 1 appearance in Berks & Bucks Senior Cup)	1	8	8
Slough Town	Total		35	27	2	1	—		20	12	57	40
Portsmouth	1964–65	Second Division	16	2	0	0	0	0	—		16	2
Portsmouth	1965–66	Second Division	32	10	2	0	2	0	—		36	10
Portsmouth	1966–67	Second Division	22	2	4	2	1	0	—		27	4
Portsmouth	1967–68	Second Division	1	0	0	0	0	0	—		1	0
Portsmouth	Total		71	14	6	2	3	0	—		80	16
Brentford (loan)	1967–68	Fourth Division	11	2	—		—		—		11	2
Career total			117	43	8	3	3	0	20	12	148	58

== Honours ==
Slough Town

- Berks & Bucks Senior Cup: 1954–55
- Berks & Bucks Benevolent Cup: 1955–56, 1956–57
