= Eddie Reeve =

English footballer and manager

Personal information
- Full name: Edward Gordon Reeve
- Date of birth: 3 December 1947 (age 78)
- Place of birth: Hounslow, England
- Position: Midfielder

Youth career
- 1964–1965: Brentford

Senior career*
| Years | Team | Apps | (Gls) |
| 1965–1968 | Brentford | 24 | (0) |
| | → Lincoln City (loan) | 0 | (0) |
| 1968 | Los Angeles Wolves | 28 | (3) |
| 1969–1976 | Hillingdon Borough | 175 | (114) |
| 1976–1977 | Enfield | | |
| 1977–1979 | Hillingdon Borough | 73 | (24) |
- Hounslow
- Woking

Managerial career
- Hounslow
- * Club domestic league appearances and goals

Edward Gordon Reeve (born 3 December 1947) was an English professional footballer who played as a midfielder in the Football League for Brentford. He later managed Hounslow in non-League football.

== Playing career ==
=== Brentford ===
Reeve began his career in the youth team at Third Division club Brentford. Just over a week after turning 18, he made his debut for the club in a 2–0 defeat to Mansfield Town on 11 December 1965. A disastrous 1965–66 season saw the Bees relegated to the Fourth Division for 1966–67 and Reeve broke through into the team, making 22 appearances. Due to financial problems at Brentford causing the reserve team to be folded, Reeve departed to gain further experience at fellow Fourth Division club Lincoln City, but failed to make an appearance. He made just two appearances during the 1967–68 season before his departure. Reeve made 26 appearances in all competitions for Brentford.

=== Los Angeles Wolves ===
Reeve moved to the United States in 1968 to join Los Angeles Wolves for the inaugural season of the North American Soccer League.

=== Non-League football ===
Reeve returned to England in 1969 and played in non-League football for Hillingdon Borough, Enfield, Hounslow and Woking. He was awarded a testimonial by Hillingdon Borough in 1975.

== Managerial career ==
Reeve managed Southern League South Division club Hounslow in the early 1980s.

== Personal life ==
Reeve's brother Geoff was also a footballer and signed a schoolboy contract with Brentford in September 1966.

== Career statistics ==
Appearances and goals by club, season and competition
| Club | Season | League | | | National Cup | | League Cup | | Total | |
| Club | Season | Division | Apps | Goals | Apps | Goals | Apps | Goals | Apps | Goals |
|---|---|---|---|---|---|---|---|---|---|---|
| Brentford | 1965–66 | Third Division | 2 | 0 | 0 | 0 | 0 | 0 | 2 | 0 |
| Brentford | 1966–67 | Fourth Division | 20 | 0 | 1 | 0 | 1 | 0 | 22 | 0 |
| Brentford | 1967–68 | Fourth Division | 2 | 0 | 0 | 0 | 0 | 0 | 2 | 0 |
| Brentford | Total | | 24 | 0 | 1 | 0 | 1 | 0 | 26 | 0 |
| Los Angeles Wolves | 1968 | North American Soccer League | 28 | 3 | — | | — | | 28 | 3 |
| Career total | | | 52 | 3 | 1 | 0 | 1 | 0 | 54 | 3 |

== Honours ==
Enfield

- Isthmian League First Division: 1976–77
