= John South (footballer, born 1948) =

English footballer

Personal information
- Full name: John Edward South
- Date of birth: 8 April 1948 (age 78)
- Place of birth: Lambeth, England
- Position: Centre forward

Youth career
- –1966: Fulham

Senior career*
Years	Team	Apps	(Gls)
1966–1967	Brentford	1	(0)
- Guildford City
- Metropolitan Police
- * Club domestic league appearances and goals

John Edward South (born 8 April 1948) is an English retired professional footballer who made one appearance as a centre forward in the Football League for Brentford. In his subsequent career in non-League football, South spent nearly 10 years with Metropolitan Police.

== Playing career ==
=== Brentford ===
South began his career in the youth system at Fulham, before moving to West London rivals Brentford in November 1966. He made just two appearances before suffering a severe knee injury in training. In a period of financial uncertainty for the Griffin Park club, South was released as a cost-cutting measure at the end of the 1966–67 season.

=== Non-league football ===
South dropped into non-League football to sign for Southern League Premier Division club Guildford City in 1967. After suffering further injury woes, he joined Metropolitan Police and stayed with the club for nearly a decade.

== Personal life ==
South's brother Ernie also played football and was a goalkeeper for the Brentford junior team.

== Career statistics ==
Appearances and goals by club, season and competition
Club	Season	League			FA Cup		League Cup		Total	
Club	Season	Division	Apps	Goals	Apps	Goals	Apps	Goals	Apps	Goals
Brentford	1966–67	Fourth Division	1	0	1	0	0	0	2	0
Career total			1	0	1	0	0	0	2	0
