= John Richardson (footballer, born 1949) =

English footballer

Personal information
- Full name: John Pattinson Richardson
- Date of birth: 5 February 1949 (age 77)
- Place of birth: Stannington, England
- Position: Defender

Youth career
- Millwall

Senior career*
Years	Team	Apps	(Gls)
1965–1966	Millwall	1	(0)
1966–1969	Brentford	85	(7)
1969–1973	Fulham	71	(6)
1972	→ Dallas Tornado (loan)	9	(1)
1973–1977	Aldershot	121	(6)
- Hillingdon Borough
- * Club domestic league appearances and goals

John Pattinson Richardson (born 5 February 1949) was an English professional footballer who played as a defender in the Football League for Millwall, Brentford, Fulham and Aldershot.

== Playing career ==
=== Millwall ===
Richardson began his career in the youth system at Third Division club Millwall and made two appearances during the 1965–66 season.

=== Brentford ===
Richardson moved to Fourth Division club Brentford in May 1966 and went into the youth and reserve teams. He made his senior debut at age 17 in a 3–1 defeat to Lincoln City on 7 September 1966. Richardson came to prominence amongst the Brentford supporters in a match versus Tranmere Rovers on 10 February 1967. An injury to Peter Gelson saw Richardson included in the starting lineup and his performance led to a write-up in the Middlesex Chronicle. Richardson finished the 1966–67 season with 24 appearances to his name and played in the victorious 1967 London Challenge Cup-winning team. He was a virtual ever-present during the 1967–68 season, making 45 appearances. Richardson made four appearances during the 1969–70 season before departing the club, having made 96 appearances for the Bees.

=== Fulham ===
Richardson joined Brentford's West London rivals Fulham in August 1969 for a £12,500 fee. He made 71 appearances and scored six goals for the club in a four-year spell and helped the club to promotion to the Second Division in the 1970–71 season.

==== Dallas Tornado (loan) ====
Richardson had a loan spell at North American Soccer League club Dallas Tornado during the 1972 season and he scored once in 9 appearances.

=== Aldershot ===
Richardson dropped into the Third Division to sign for Aldershot in July 1973. He made 121 appearances and scored six goals for the club before departing in 1977.

=== Hillingdon Borough ===
After departing Aldershot, Richardson dropped into non-League football and signed for Southern League Premier Division club Hillingdon Borough.

== Personal life ==
Richardson's uncle was Billy Gray, who managed Richardson at Millwall and Brentford.

== Honours ==
Brentford

- London Challenge Cup: 1966–67

Fulham

- Football League Third Division second-place promotion: 1970–71

== Career statistics ==
Appearances and goals by club, season and competition
Club	Season	League			National Cup		League Cup		Total	
Club	Season	Division	Apps	Goals	Apps	Goals	Apps	Goals	Apps	Goals
Millwall	1965–66	Third Division	1	0	0	0	1	0	2	0
Brentford	1966–67	Fourth Division	20	2	3	1	1	0	24	3
Brentford	1967–68	Fourth Division	21	1	1	0	0	0	22	1
Brentford	1968–69	Fourth Division	42	4	2	0	2	0	46	4
Brentford	1969–70	Fourth Division	2	0	—		2	0	4	0
Brentford	Total		85	7	6	0	4	0	95	7
Dallas Tornado (loan)	1972	North American Soccer League	9	1	—		—		9	1
Career total			95	8	6	0	5	0	106	8
