= Keith Hooker =

English footballer (born 1950)

Personal information
- Full name: Keith William Hooker
- Date of birth: 31 January 1950 (age 76)
- Place of birth: Fleet, Hampshire, England
- Position: Wing half

Senior career*
Years	Team	Apps	(Gls)
1966–1969	Brentford	32	(2)
- → Brentwood Town (loan)
1969	Durban Spurs		
1970–1972	Port Elizabeth City		
- * Club domestic league appearances and goals

Keith William Hooker (born 31 January 1950) is an English retired professional footballer who played as a wing half in the Football League for Brentford.

== Career ==
=== Brentford ===
Hooker progressed through the Brentford youth team to make his senior debut at age 16 in a 0–0 Fourth Division draw with Wrexham on 14 January 1967, due to an injury crisis. He impressed enough to make 9 further appearances during the remainder of the 1966–67 season and scored his maiden goal for the club with the only goal of the game versus Notts County on 1 April. Hooker was a first team regular during the 1967–68 season and made 23 appearances, scored one goal and signed a professional contract in February 1968. He made just one appearance during the 1968–69 season and departed the club at the end of the campaign. Hooker made 34 appearances and scored two goals for the Bees.

==== Brentwood Town (loan) ====
While with Brentford, Hooker had a loan spell with Essex Olympian League club Brentwood Town.

=== South Africa ===
After his release from Brentford, Hooker moved to South Africa and played for National Football League clubs Durban Spurs and Port Elizabeth City between 1970 and 1972. He played under former teammate Matt Crowe at the latter club.

== Personal life ==
After his retirement from football, Hooker remained in South Africa.

== Career statistics ==
Appearances and goals by club, season and competition
Club	Season	League			FA Cup		League Cup		Total	
Club	Season	Division	Apps	Goals	Apps	Goals	Apps	Goals	Apps	Goals
Brentford	1966–67	Fourth Division	10	1	0	0	0	0	10	1
Brentford	1967–68	Fourth Division	21	1	1	0	1	0	23	1
Brentford	1968–69	Fourth Division	1	0	0	0	0	0	1	0
Career total			32	2	1	0	1	0	34	2
