= Michael Ogburn =

English footballer

Personal information
- Full name: Michael George Ogburn
- Date of birth: 19 February 1948 (age 78)
- Place of birth: Portsmouth, England
- Position: Full back

Youth career
- Portsmouth
- 1965–1966: Brentford

Senior career*
Years	Team	Apps	(Gls)
1966–1967	Brentford	12	(0)
- * Club domestic league appearances and goals

Michael George Ogburn (born 19 February 1948) is an English retired professional footballer who played as a full back in the Football League for Brentford.

== Career statistics ==
Appearances and goals by club, season and competition
Club	Season	League			FA Cup		League Cup		Total	
Club	Season	Division	Apps	Goals	Apps	Goals	Apps	Goals	Apps	Goals
Brentford	1966–67	Fourth Division	12	0	1	0	0	0	13	0
Career total			12	0	1	0	0	0	13	0
