= Brian Bedford (footballer) =

Welsh footballer (1933–2022)

Personal information
- Full name: Noel Brian Bedford
- Date of birth: 24 December 1933
- Place of birth: Ferndale, Rhondda Cynon Taf, Wales
- Date of death: 18 May 2022 (aged 88)
- Position: Centre forward

Youth career
- Beddau Youth Club

Senior career*
Years	Team	Apps	(Gls)
1954–1955	Reading	3	(1)
1955–1956	Southampton	5	(2)
1956–1959	AFC Bournemouth	75	(32)
1959–1965	Queens Park Rangers	258	(161)
1965–1966	Scunthorpe United	37	(23)
1966–1967	Brentford	21	(10)
1967	Atlanta Chiefs	4	(4)
1968–1969	Bexley United		
- * Club domestic league appearances and goals

Noel Brian Bedford (24 December 1933 – 18 May 2022) was a Welsh professional footballer. He played the majority of his career at Queens Park Rangers, as a centre forward.

== Playing career ==
Bedford started his professional career at Reading, where he was spotted by Ted Bates who signed him for Southampton in July 1955. He made only a handful of appearances for Southampton before moving on to AFC Bournemouth in August 1956.

After scoring 32 goals in 75 games for Bournemouth he was signed by Queens Park Rangers' manager Alec Stock in 1959 for just £750 and made his debut that August in a 2–0 win against Swindon Town. He went on to play 258 league games for Rangers scoring a remarkable 161 goals (180 in all competitions).

He is QPR's second highest goal scorer behind George Goddard. However, despite being a prolific striker, his team never managed to achieve promotion to the Second Division. The closest they managed was a third-place finish in 1960–61 with Bedford scoring an impressive 33 in 44 league games that season.

Bedford was transferred to Scunthorpe United in August 1965 just as a young and dynamic Queens Park Rangers team was taking shape (they cruised to the Third Division title and won the League Cup just two seasons later).

After short spells at Brentford and Scunthorpe United he played briefly in the USA with Atlanta Chiefs. On returning from the U.S. in 1967 however the Football Association banned him from playing as the U.S. Football Association was at the time not affiliated. After a year he successfully appealed the ban and joined Bexley United but a knee injury forced him to retire.

Throughout his career he maintained a high strike rate, scoring 229 goals in 399 league appearances.

== Later career ==
After his retirement from playing he became a professional tennis coach and he was later the stadium manager at Loftus Road, before retiring to Llandaff in 1995.

== Sources ==
- Duncan Holley & Gary Chalk (2003). In That Number – A post-war chronicle of Southampton FC. Hagiology Publishing. ISBN 0-9534474-3-X.
- Macey, Gordon (1993). Queens Park Rangers – A Complete Record. The Breedon Books Publishing Company Limited. ISBN 978-1-873626-40-5.
