= Ernie Wilkinson =

English footballer

Personal information
- Full name: Ernest Stanley Wilkinson
- Date of birth: 13 February 1947 (age 79)
- Place of birth: Chesterfield, England
- Position: Centre half

Youth career
- –1964: Arsenal

Senior career*
Years	Team	Apps	(Gls)
1964–1966	Arsenal	0	(0)
1966–1968	Exeter City	60	(0)
1968	→ Yeovil Town (loan)	0	(0)
1968	→ Rochdale (loan)	9	(0)
1968–1970	Rhyl		
1970–1972	Nuneaton Borough		
1973–1975	AP Leamington		
- Poole Town
- * Club domestic league appearances and goals

Ernest Stanley Wilkinson (born 13 February 1947) is an English retired professional footballer who played in the Football League for Exeter City and Rochdale as a centre half.

== Honours ==
Nuneaton Borough

- Midland Floodlit Cup: 1970–71

== Career statistics ==
Appearances and goals by club, season and competition
Club	Season	League			FA Cup		League Cup		Other		Total	
Club	Season	Division	Apps	Goals	Apps	Goals	Apps	Goals	Apps	Goals	Apps	Goals
Rochdale (loan)	1967–68	Fourth Division	9	0	—		—		—		9	0
Nuneaton Borough	1970–71	Southern League Premier Division	32	0	4	0	—		17 (Note: 11 appearances and 1 goal in Midland Floodlit Cup, 2 appearances in Southern League Cup, 2 appearances in Camkin Cup, 1 appearance in Birmingham Senior Cup, 1 appearance in President's Cup)	1	53	1
Nuneaton Borough	1971–72	Southern League Premier Division	7	0	1	0	—		16 (Note: 13 appearances in Midland Floodlit Cup, 1 appearance in Birmingham Senior Cup, 1 appearance in Camkin Cup, 1 appearance in President's Cup)	0	24	0
Nuneaton Borough	Total		39	0	5	0	—		33	1	77	1
Career total			48	0	5	0	0	0	33	0	86	1
