= Hamish MacKenzie =

Scottish footballer (born 1945)

Personal information
- Full name: Hamish James Todd MacKenzie
- Date of birth: 11 March 1945 (age 81)
- Place of birth: Denny, Scotland
- Position: Full back

Youth career
- Woodburn Athletic
- 1960–1962: Liverpool

Senior career*
Years	Team	Apps	(Gls)
1962–1963	Liverpool	0	(0)
1963–1964	Dunfermline Athletic	0	(0)
1964–1967	Brentford	19	(0)
- * Club domestic league appearances and goals

Hamish James Todd MacKenzie (born 11 March 1945) is a Scottish retired professional footballer who played as a full back in the Football League for Brentford.

== Career ==
=== Early years ===
MacKenzie began his career in his native Scotland with Woodburn Athletic, before joining English Second Division club Liverpool in 1960. He signed a professional contract in March 1962, but failed to make a first team appearance before departing Anfield in 1963. MacKenzie returned to his native Scotland to join Scottish League First Division club Dunfermline Athletic in 1963, but failed to make an appearance during the 1963–64 season and departed the club at the end of the campaign.

=== Brentford ===
MacKenzie returned to England to sign for Third Division club Brentford in August 1964. He was mostly confined to the reserve team during his first two seasons with the club and made just three first team appearances. MacKenzie made a breakthrough of sorts during the 1966–67 season and made 20 appearances, but financial cutbacks at the stricken club forced his release at the end of the season. He made just 23 first team appearances for Brentford, but found success with the reserve team, with whom he won the London Challenge Cup in 1964–65 and 1966–67.

== Personal life ==
MacKenzie's uncle, Duncan McKenzie, was also a professional footballer and played for Brentford and Middlesbrough.

== Career statistics ==
Appearances and goals by club, season and competition
Club	Season	League			FA Cup		League Cup		Total	
Club	Season	Division	Apps	Goals	Apps	Goals	Apps	Goals	Apps	Goals
Brentford	1964–65	Third Division	0	0	0	0	1	0	1	0
Brentford	1965–66	Third Division	2	0	0	0	0	0	2	0
Brentford	1966–67	Fourth Division	17	0	0	0	3	0	20	0
Career total			19	0	0	0	4	0	23	0

== Honours ==
Brentford Reserves

- London Challenge Cup: 1964–65, 1966–67
