= Brian Albeson =

English footballer (1946–2003)

Personal information
- Full name: Brian Albeson
- Date of birth: 14 December 1946
- Place of birth: Oldham, England
- Date of death: 15 October 2003 (aged 56)
- Place of death: Darlington, England
- Height: 6 ft 0 in (1.83 m)
- Position: Centre half

Youth career
- –: Bury

Senior career*
Years	Team	Apps	(Gls)
1965–1967	Bury	1	(0)
1967–1971	Darlington	137	(2)
1971–1974	Southend United	110	(9)
1974–1975	Stockport County	54	(1)
1975	Hartlepool	0	(0)
–	Gateshead		

International career
1965	England youth	1	(0)
- * Club domestic league appearances and goals

Brian Albeson (14 December 1946 – 15 October 2003) was an English professional footballer who scored 12 goals from 302 appearances in the Football League playing as a centre half for Bury, Darlington, Southend United and Stockport County. He also played in the Football League Cup for Hartlepool and in non-League football for Gateshead.

== Life and career ==
Albeson was born in Oldham, Lancashire, and began his football career with Bury. He was capped by England youth in January 1965, in a 3–2 defeat to Northern Ireland in the Home Nations Youth Championships. He played once in the Football League for Bury before joining Darlington in 1967. He spent four years at Darlington, making 154 appearances in all competitions, and forming a regular partnership with Joe Jacques, before following Jacques to Southend United. In his first season at Southend he shared the club's Player of the Year award with Bill Garner, and went on to make 120 appearances in all competitions. He signed for Stockport County in March 1974, remaining there until the end of the next season. He then played once for Hartlepool, in the League Cup against Halifax Town, before moving into non-League football with Gateshead.

After retiring from football, Albeson ran a hairdressers in Darlington. He was married to Anne and had four children: Louise, Simon, Claire and Leanne. He died in 2003 at the age of 56.

== Honours ==
- Southend United Player of the Year: 1971–72brians first wife was sandra and they were married for 15 years and Louise was their only child, he did not have any children with his 2nd wife Anne
