= John Regan (footballer) =

English footballer

Personal information
- Full name: Matthew John Regan
- Date of birth: 18 June 1944 (age 82)
- Place of birth: Worcester, England
- Position: Centre forward

Youth career
- Claines
- 1959–1961: Birmingham City

Senior career*
Years	Team	Apps	(Gls)
1961–1964	Birmingham City	5	(2)
1964–1966	Shrewsbury Town	21	(6)
1966	Brentford	14	(5)
1966–1968	Crewe Alexandra	51	(17)
1968–1971	Doncaster Rovers	95	(25)
–	Bromsgrove Rovers		
- * Club domestic league appearances and goals

Matthew John Regan (born 18 June 1944) is an English former professional footballer who scored 55 goals from 185 appearances in the Football League playing for Birmingham City, Shrewsbury Town, Brentford, Crewe Alexandra and Doncaster Rovers. He played as a centre forward.

Regan was born in Worcester. He played football from age 11 until 16 at the Sacred Heart College in Droitwich and went on to WRGS for A-levels. Royal Grammar School being a rugby-playing establishment, Birmingham City's scouts spotted him with his junior club. He signed for Birmingham in 1959, initially as an amateur, and turned professional two years later. Regan scored the opening goal on his debut in the First Division on 13 October 1962, deputising for Jimmy Harris in a home game against Manchester City which finished as a 2–2 draw. He played once more that season and three times in 1963–64, scoring one more goal, and was allowed to leave in October 1964, aged still only 20, to join Shrewsbury Town of the Third Division. He went on to play for Brentford, Crewe Alexandra and Doncaster Rovers, scoring regularly but not prolifically, and then moved into non-league football with Bromsgrove Rovers.
