= Basie =

Basie may refer to:

- Azraq, Jordan, known as Basie or Basienis by the Romans
- William James "Count" Basie (1904–1984), American jazz musician
  - Basie, the bandleader's 1954 album on the Clef label
  - Basie, the bandleader's 1958 album on the Roulette label, later re-released as The Atomic Mr. Basie
- Basie Vivier (1927 – 2009), South African rugby union player
