= Phil Basey =

Welsh footballer (born 1948)

Personal information
- Full name: Philip John Basey
- Date of birth: 27 August 1948 (age 78)
- Place of birth: Cardiff, Wales
- Position: Left winger

Senior career*
Years	Team	Apps	(Gls)
1966–1967	Brentford	2	(0)
1967–1968	Gloucester City	39	(9)
1968–1972	Crawley Town	136	(76)
1972–1976	Maidstone United		
1977–1978	Hillingdon Borough		(1)
1978–1979	Tooting & Mitcham United	18	(6)
- Bromley
- * Club domestic league appearances and goals

Philip John Basey (born 27 August 1948) is a Welsh retired professional footballer who played as a left winger in the Football League for Brentford. After his release in 1967, he played for over a decade in non-League football and notably scored over 100 career goals for Southern League club Crawley Town.

== Playing career ==
Basey began his career in the youth team at Fourth Division club Brentford, after writing to the club requesting a trial. He progressed to sign a professional contract in July 1966. At age 18, he made his professional debut in a league match versus Tranmere Rovers on 24 September 1966 and played the full 90 minutes of the 1–1 draw. His second and final appearance for the club came three days later, in a 2–2 draw with Lincoln City. After his release at the end of the 1966–67 season, Basey dropped into non-League football and played for Gloucester City, Crawley Town, Maidstone United, Hillingdon Borough, Tooting & Mitcham United and Bromley.

== Career statistics ==
Appearances and goals by club, season and competition
Club	Season	League			FA Cup		League Cup		Other		Total	
Club	Season	Division	Apps	Goals	Apps	Goals	Apps	Goals	Apps	Goals	Apps	Goals
Brentford	1966–67	Fourth Division	2	0	0	0	0	0	―		2	0
Crawley Town	1968–69	Southern League First Division	36	18	1	0	―		1 (Note: Appearance in Sussex Professional Cup)	0	38	18
Crawley Town	1969–70	Southern League Premier Division	33	17	6	2	―		6 (Note: 4 appearances and 1 goal in FA Trophy, 1 appearance in Sussex Professional Cup, 1 appearance in Southern League Cup)	3	45	22
Crawley Town	1970–71	Southern League First Division	38	22	7	4	―		4 (Note: 2 appearances in Southern League Cup, 1 appearance in FA Trophy, 1 appearance in Sussex Professional Cup)	0	49	26
Crawley Town	1971–72	Southern League First Division South	29	19	6	4	―		11 (Note: 7 appearances and 1 goal in Southern League Cup, 2 appearances and 1 goal in FA Trophy, 2 appearances and 2 goals in Sussex Professional Cup)	4	46	27
Crawley Town	Total		136	76	20	10	―		22	7	178	93
Career total			138	76	20	10	0	0	22	7	180	93

== Honours ==
Crawley Town

- Southern League First Division fourth-place promotion: 1968–69
- Sussex Professional Cup: 1969–70

Maidstone United

- Southern League First Division South: 1972–73
