= Ian Lawther =

Northern Irish footballer

Personal information
- Full name: William Ian Lawther
- Date of birth: 20 October 1939
- Place of birth: Belfast, Northern Ireland
- Date of death: 25 April 2010 (aged 70)
- Place of death: Oxford, England
- Position: Forward

Senior career*
Years	Team	Apps	(Gls)
1957–1958	Crusaders	?	(5)
1958–1961	Sunderland	75	(41)
1961–1963	Blackburn Rovers	59	(21)
1963–1964	Scunthorpe United	60	(22)
1964–1968	Brentford	139	(43)
1968–1971	Halifax Town	101	(23)
1971–1976	Stockport County	164	(29)
1976–?	Bangor City	?	(?)

International career
1960–1962	Northern Ireland	4	(0)
- * Club domestic league appearances and goals

William Ian Lawther (20 October 1939 – 25 April 2010) was a Northern Irish footballer who played for Sunderland and five other clubs in the English Football League. He also played four internationals for Northern Ireland.

== Club career ==
Lawther started his footballing career in his native Northern Ireland with Crusaders before moving to England, with Sunderland in 1958. A fine header of the ball, with an excellent instinct for finding space, he made his debut for Sunderland on 31 August 1959 against Aston Villa in a 3–0 at Villa Park. Between 1959 and 1961, he scored 41 goals in only 75 league appearances for Sunderland, a remarkable rate which, given the overall calibre of the players around him, has gone largely unrecognised. The arrival of Brian Clough saw him squeezed out of contention, consequently a marvellous opportunity to combine his considerable abilities with Clough's was very unwisely overlooked. He then signed for Blackburn Rovers for £18,000 in 1961 making 59 appearances, and scoring 21 goals in his time there.

He then moved to Scunthorpe United in 1963 for £12,000 and scored 22 goals for the Lincolnshire-based club in 60 league appearances. Following this, he joined Brentford for £17,000 in November 1964 and went on to make 152 appearances, scoring 44 goals for the club. Halifax Town was his next club as he signed for £3,000 in 1968, and he played for two seasons scoring 23 goals in 101 league appearances. The club he served longest was Stockport County, but he was far less productive at his time there than with other clubs, scoring 29 goals in 164 appearances. He finished up his playing career in Bangor City before retiring.

== International career ==
He won his first international cap for Northern Ireland on 6 April 1960 against Wales in a 3–2 defeat. He won three further caps for his country, making a total of four appearances without scoring a goal.
