= Arnold Oxspring =

English association football player

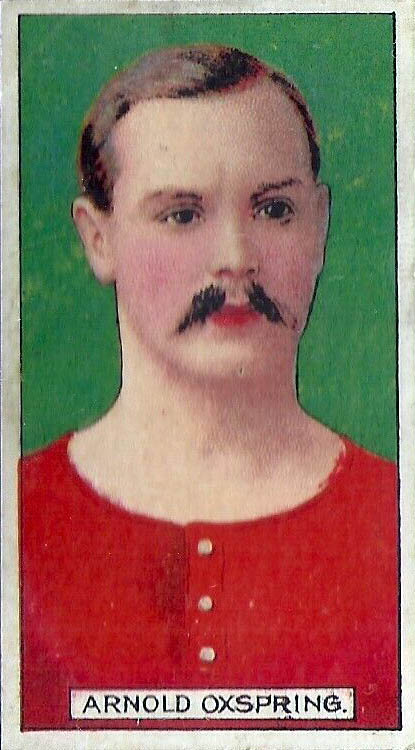
- Arnold Oxspring on a 1907 Cigarette card

Personal information
- Date of birth: c. 1876
- Date of death: ?
- Positions: Inside right; left half

Senior career*
Years	Team	Apps	(Gls)
–1897	Ecclesfield		
1897–1900	Doncaster Rovers		(51)
1900–1911?	Barnsley		
- * Club domestic league appearances and goals

Arnold Oxspring (born c. 1876; death year unknown) was an English footballer who played with Doncaster Rovers and Barnsley around the 1900s.

== Playing career ==
=== Doncaster Rovers ===
Coming from the Ecclesfield club, Oxspring was signed by Doncaster Rovers to replace McUrich at inside right who had broken his leg. In his debut on 4 September 1887 he scored 4 in a 6–0 home win over Long Eaton Rangers in the Midland League.

On 5 November 1888, he scored two in Doncaster's joint highest win, a 14–0 victory over Huddersfield Town. Over three seasons, Oxspring scored 56 goals in the Midland League, Yorkshire League, Wharncliffe Charity Cup League, and FA Cup.

=== Barnsley ===
Football League club Barnsley signed him for the start of the 1900–01 season. He played in the left half position and went on to become club captain.

== Honours ==
=== Doncaster Rovers ===
- Midland League Champions: 1898–99
- Yorkshire League Runners-up: 1898–99
