= Billy Cobb =

English footballer

Personal information
- Full name: Walter William Cobb
- Date of birth: 29 September 1940
- Place of birth: Newark, England
- Date of death: 27 July 2021 (aged 80)
- Place of death: Nottinghamshire, England
- Position: Midfielder

Senior career*
| Years | Team | Apps | (Gls) |
- Ransome & Marles
| 1958–1963 | Nottingham Forest | 30 | (5) |
| 1963–1964 | Plymouth Argyle | 31 | (0) |
| 1964–1966 | Brentford | 71 | (23) |
| 1966–1968 | Lincoln City | 67 | (10) |
| 1968–1971 | Boston United | | |
- * Club domestic league appearances and goals

Walter William Cobb (29 September 1940 – 27 July 2021), known as Billy Cobb, was an English footballer who scored 38 goals from 199 appearances in the Football League playing for Nottingham Forest, Plymouth Argyle, Brentford and Lincoln City. He played in midfield. He went on to play for Boston United in the Northern Premier League.

Cobb was the scorer of Nottingham Forest's first goal in European football, in a 5–1 defeat to Valencia in the 1961–62 Fairs Cup. He scored a hat-trick on his Lincoln City debut, in an 8–1 defeat of Luton Town. After retiring from football he kept a pub in Nottingham and managed the bars at Nottingham Ice Stadium.
