= List of Brentford F.C. records and statistics =

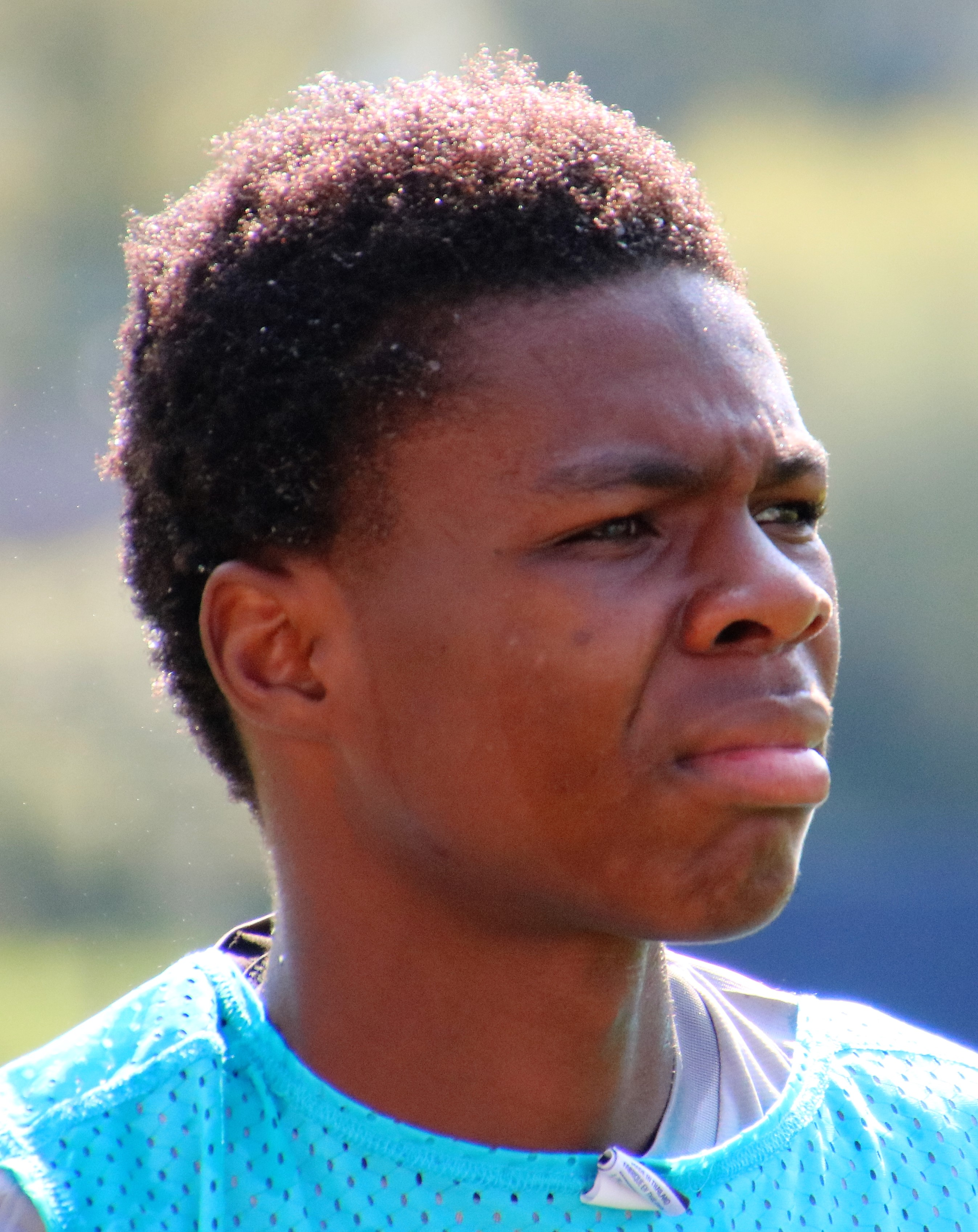
The undisclosed fee Brentford paid for midfielder Mamadou Sangaré in August 2026 is the club's incoming transfer record.

Brentford Football Club is an English professional football club based in Brentford, Hounslow, London. Between 1897 and 1920, the first team competed in the London League, Southern League and Western League. Since 1920, the first team has competed in the Football League, the Premier League and other nationally and internationally organised competitions.

The list encompasses the major honours won by Brentford, records set by the club, its managers and its players. "League" constitutes records and statistics from the 1920–21 season until the present day, during which the club has competed in League football.

== Club honours and best performances ==
=== Major domestic competitions ===
==== Leagues ====
First Division / Premier League (level 1)

- Best performance: 5th – 1935–36

Second Division / First Division / Championship (level 2)

- Winners (1): 1934–35
- Play-off winners (1): 2021

Third Division / Third Division South / Second Division / League One (level 3)

- Winners (2): 1932–33, 1991–92
- Runners-up (4): 1929–30, 1957–58, 1994–95, (Note: Not promoted after defeat in the 1995 Football League Second Division play-off semi-finals.) 2013–14

Fourth Division / Third Division / League Two (level 4)

- Winners (3): 1962–63, 1998–99, 2008–09
- Third-place promotion (1): 1971–72
- Fourth-place promotion (1): 1977–78

==== Cups ====
FA Cup

- Best performance: Sixth round/quarter-final – 1937–38, 1945–46, 1948–49, 1988–89

EFL Cup

- Best performance: Semi-final – 2020–21

EFL Trophy

- Best performance: Finalists – 1984–85, 2000–01, 2010–11

=== European competitions ===
Anglo-Italian Cup

- Best performance: Semi-final – 1992–93

=== Minor domestic competitions ===
==== Leagues ====
Southern League First Division / Premier Division

- Best performance: 9th – 1905–06

Southern League Second Division

- Winners: 1900–01

United League

- Winners: 1907–08

Western League First Division / Premier Division

- Best performance: 2nd – 1904–05

London League First Division

- Best performance: 2nd – 1897–98

London League Second Division

- Best performance: 2nd – 1896–97 (Note: Promoted.)

==== Cups ====
Middlesex Junior Cup

- Winners (1): 1893–94

West Middlesex Cup

- Winners (1): 1894–95

London Senior Cup

- Winners (1): 1897–98

Middlesex Senior Cup

- Winners (1): 1897–98

Southern Professional Charity Cup

- Winners (1): 1908–09

Ealing Hospital Cup

- Winners (1): 1910–11

London Challenge Cup

- Winners (3): 1934–35, 1964–65, 1966–67

Supporters Direct Cup

- Winners (2): 2004, 2008

Empire Exhibition Trophy

- Best performance: First round – 1938

FA Amateur Cup

- Best performance: First round – 1898–99

Southern Professional Floodlit Cup

- Best performance: Semi-final – 1955–56, 1956–57

First Alliance Cup

- Best performance: First round – 1988

Kent Challenge Cup

- Best performance: Runners-up – 1975–76

== Player records ==
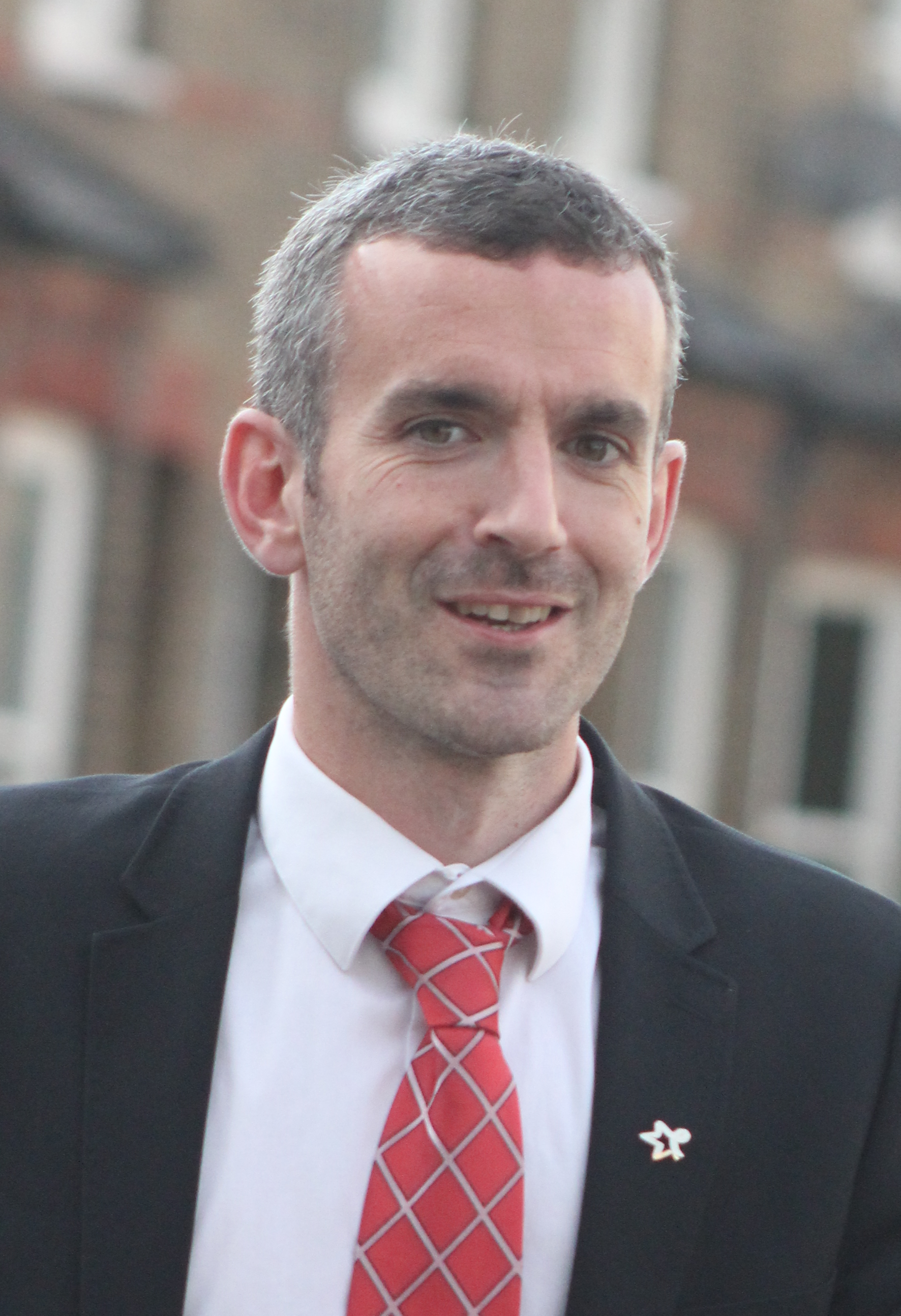
Brentford Hall of Fame member Kevin O'Connor retired in 2015, after making 501 appearances.

=== Appearances ===
- Youngest debutant (all competitions): Paul Walker – 15 years, 7 months, 28 days (versus Watford, Football League Cup first round, August 1976)
- Youngest League debutant: Danis Salman – 15 years, 8 months, 3 days (versus Watford, Fourth Division, 15 November 1975)
- Oldest player: Jimmy Hodson – 40 years, 8 months, 2 days (versus Plymouth Argyle, Third Division, 7 May 1921)
- Oldest debutant: Simon Royce – 39 years, 4 months, 20 days (versus Yeovil Town, League One, 29 January 2011)
- Oldest player to make League debut with the club: Javi Venta – 37 years, 8 months, 4 days (versus Gillingham, League One, 17 August 2013)
- Most consecutive appearances: 187 – Gerry Cakebread (1 November 1958 – 18 August 1962)
- Most consecutive League appearances: 168 – Gerry Cakebread (1 November 1958 – 18 August 1962)
- Most consecutive FA Cup appearance: 30 – Ken Coote (9 January 1954 – 16 November 1963)
- Most appearances in a season (all competitions): 62 – Terry Evans (1988–89)
- Most top-tier League appearances: 185 – Idris Hopkins
- Most Southern League appearances: 206 – Jimmy Jay
- Most appearances by a player born outside the British Isles (all competitions): 249 – Sergi Canós
- Most League appearances by a player born outside the British Isles: 225 – Sergi Canós
- Most seasons in which made at least one first team appearance (all competitions): 16 – Kevin O'Connor
- Most seasons in which made at least one League appearance: 15 – Kevin O'Connor

==== Most appearances ====
As of match played 28 May 2023. Competitive matches only, includes appearances as substitute. Numbers in brackets indicate goals scored. Years are listed according to the player's first and last appearances for the club.

No.	Name	Years	League	FA Cup	League Cup	Other (Note: Includes appearances in Empire Exhibition Trophy, Football League Trophy, Football League play-offs and Anglo-Italian Cup.)	Total
1	(England) Ken Coote	1949–1963	514(14)	35(1)	10(0)	0 (0)	559(15)
2	(England) Jamie Bates	1987–1999	419(18)	21(2)	40(3)	44 (1)	526(24)
3	(England) Peter Gelson	1961–1974	471(17)	29 (0)	17(1)	0 (0)	516(18)
4	(Republic of Ireland) Kevin O'Connor	2000–2014	425(32)	31(4)	20(4)	24 (4)	501(44)
5	(Scotland) Tommy Higginson	1960–1970	388(15)	27(1)	18(0)	0 (0)	435(16)
6	(Scotland) Jackie Graham	1970–1980	374(38)	21(2)	14(0)	0 (0)	409(40)
7	(England) Keith Millen	1984–1994	305(17)	18(1)	26(6)	31 (0)	380(20)
8	(England) Gerry Cakebread	1954–1964	348(0)	20(0)	6(0)	0 (0)	374(0)
9	(England) Danis Salman	1975–1985	325 (8)	17 (0)	19 (0)	10 (0)	371 (8)
10	(England) Alan Nelmes	1967–1976	316(2)	19(0)	15(0)	0 (0)	350(2)

=== Goalscoring ===
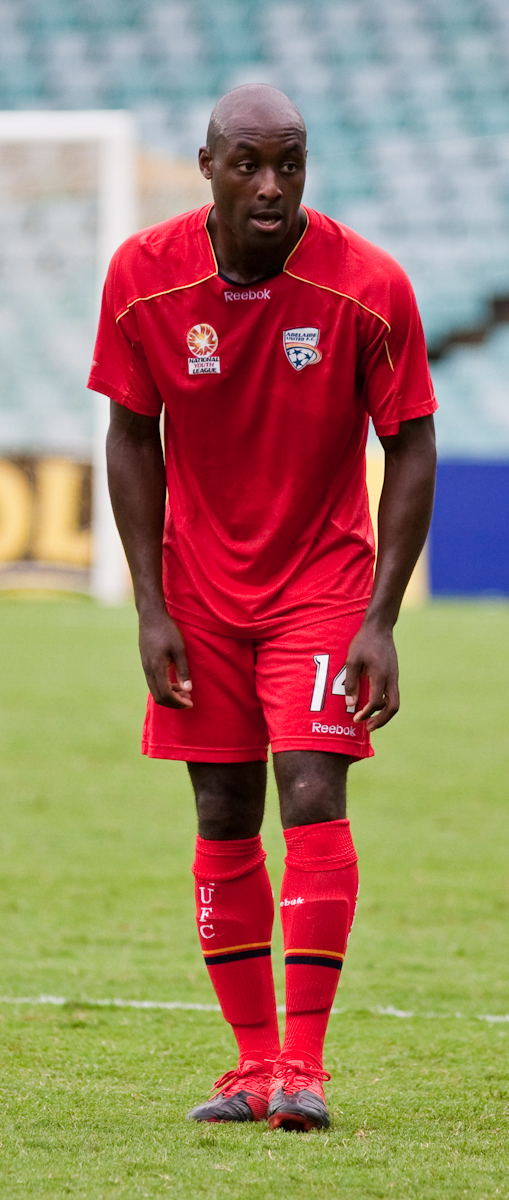
Ghanaian international Lloyd Owusu scored 87 goals in two spells between 1998 and 2007.

==== League ====
===== Southern League =====
- Most Southern League goals: 58 – Geordie Reid
- Most goals in a Southern League season: 21 – Adam Bowman (First Division, 1907–08), Geordie Reid (First Division, 1910–11)
- Most goals in a Southern League match: 5
  - C. Ward (versus Wycombe Wanderers, Second Division, 15 October 1898)
  - Peter Turnbull (versus Southall, Second Division, 19 January 1901)

===== Football League and Premier League =====
- Most League goals: 153 – Jim Towers
- Most League goals in a season: 38 – Jack Holliday (Third Division South, 1932–33)
- Most League goals in a top-tier season: 31 – David McCulloch (First Division, 1936–37)
- Most League goals in a second-tier season: 31 – Ivan Toney (Championship, 2020–21)
- Most League goals in a third-tier season: 38 – Jack Holliday (Third Division South, 1932–33)
- Most League goals in a fourth-tier season: 32 – Steve Phillips (Fourth Division, 1977–78)
- Most top-tier League goals: 85 – David McCulloch
- Most second-tier League goals: 63 – Billy Dare
- Most third-tier League goals: 153 – Jim Towers
- Most fourth-tier League goals: 64 – Roger Cross
- Most players with 20 or more League goals in a single season: 3 – John Dick (23), Johnny Brooks (22), Billy McAdams (22) (Fourth Division, 1962–63)
- Most goals in a League match: 5
  - Jack Holliday (versus Luton Town, Third Division South, 28 January 1933)
  - Billy Scott (versus Barnsley, Second Division, 15 December 1934)
  - Peter McKennan (versus Bury, Second Division, 19 February 1949)
- Youngest League goalscorer: Richard Poole – 16 years, 9 months, 17 days (versus Bradford City, Fourth Division, 20 April 1974)
- Oldest League goalscorer: Frank Broome – 38 years, 2 months, 9 days (versus Stoke City, Second Division, 19 August 1953)
- Quickest League goalscorer: 10 seconds – George Stobbart (versus Aldershot, Third Division South, 6 November 1954)
- Most own goals in League matches: 5 – Peter Gelson, Alan Nelmes

==== Cup ====
- Most cup goals in a season: 14 – Dean Holdsworth (1991–92)
- Most FA Cup goals: 22 – Billy Scott
- Most FA Cup goals in a season (including qualifying rounds): 8 – Tommy Shanks (1902–03)
- Most FA Cup goals in a season: 6 – Gerry McAloon (1945–46)
- Most EFL Cup goals: 9
  - Gary Blissett
  - Marcus Forss
- Most EFL Cup goals in a season: 6 – Dean Holdsworth (1991–92)
- Most goals in a EFL Cup match: 4 – Marcus Forss (versus Oldham Athletic, third round, 21 September 2021)
- Most EFL Trophy goals: 9 – Dean Holdsworth
- Most EFL Trophy goals in a season: 5 – Gary Roberts (1984–85)
- Most goals in a EFL Trophy match: 4
  - Robbie Cooke (versus Orient, southern area preliminary round, 15 December 1986)
  - Mike Grella (versus Bournemouth, southern area quarter-final, 8 November 2011)
- Youngest FA Cup goalscorer: Gary Rolph – 16 years, 9 months, 26 days (versus Colchester United, second round, 20 December 1976)

==== Hat-tricks ====
- Most hat-tricks (all competitions): 9 – Jack Holliday
- Most hat-tricks in a Southern League season: 3 – Geordie Reid (First Division, 1910–11)
- Most hat-tricks in a League season: 5 – Jack Holliday (Third Division South, 1932–33)
- Fastest hat-trick (all competitions): 3 minutes – Gary Roberts (versus Newport County, Football League Trophy southern area final, 17 May 1985)
- Fastest League hat-trick: 7 minutes – Carl Asaba (versus Shrewsbury Town, Second Division, 31 August 1996)
- Youngest hat-trick scorer: Jordan Rhodes – 18 years 11 months, 26 days (versus Shrewsbury Town, League Two, 31 January 2009)
- Hat-trick scored on club debut: Andy Woon (versus Port Vale, Third Division, 10 February 1973)
- First hat-trick scored by a substitute: Bryan Mbeumo (versus Port Vale, FA Cup third round, 8 January 2022)

==== Penalties ====
- Most penalties (all competitions): 23 – Ivan Toney (20 league, 1 FA Cup, 2 play-offs)
- Most consecutive penalties scored (all competitions): 22 – Ivan Toney (19 league, 1 FA Cup, 2 play-offs)
- Most penalties in a season (all competitions): 11 – Ivan Toney, 2020–21 (9 league, 2 play-offs)
- Most penalties in a Southern League season: 5 – Fred Pentland (First Division, 1906–07)
- Most penalties in a League season: 9 – Ivan Toney (Championship, 2020–21)

==== Other ====
- Fewest appearances required to reach 50 goals (all competitions): 49 – Jack Holliday
- Fewest appearances required to reach 10 League goals in a top-tier season: 11 – David McCulloch (1937–38)
- Fewest appearances required to reach 20 League goals in a top-tier season: 19 – David McCulloch (1935–36)
- Fewest appearances required to reach 30 League goals in a top-tier season: 38 – David McCulloch (1936–37)
- Fewest appearances required to reach 10 League goals in a Premier League season: 13 – Igor Thiago (2025–26)
- Quickest goalscorer on debut: 4 minutes – Lee Luscombe (versus Barnet, Football League Trophy preliminary round, 17 December 1991)
- Most consecutive matches scored in: 10 – Fred Monk (3 February – 31 March 1951)
- Most goals in a London League match: 6 – Oakey Field (versus Leyton, First Division, 8 January 1898)
- Most goals scored in a season without scoring a league goal: 6 – Marcus Forss (2021–22) (Note: Premier League record.)
- Goalkeepers who have scored for Brentford:
  - Archie Ling (penalty versus Swindon Town, Southern League First Division, 10 September 1910 and penalty versus Bristol Rovers, Southern League First Division, 17 September 1910)
  - Willie McIver (two penalties versus Millwall, Southern League First Division, 3 April 1909)

==== Top goalscorers ====
As of match played 28 May 2023. Competitive matches only. Numbers in brackets indicate appearances made.

No.	Name	Years	League	FA Cup	League Cup	Other (Note: Includes appearances in Empire Exhibition Trophy, Football League Trophy, Football League play-offs and Anglo-Italian Cup.)	Total
1	(England) Jim Towers	1954–1961	153 (262)	9 (17)	1(3)	0 (0)	163 (282)
2	(England) George Francis	1955–1961; 1961–1962	124 (260)	12 (18)	2 (0)	0 (0)	136 (280)
3	(England) Jack Holliday	1932–1939	119 (212)	3 (10)	—	0 (0)	121 (222)
4	(England) Gary Blissett	1987–1993	79 (233)	7 (14)	9 (19)	10 (25)	105 (291)
5	(Scotland) Dave McCulloch	1935–1938	85 (116)	5 (6)	—	9 (0)	90 (124)
6	(England) Billy Lane	1929–1932	79 (112)	10 (11)	—	0 (0)	89 (123)
7	(Ghana) Lloyd Owusu	1998–2002; 2005–2007	77 (215)	4 (14)	3(8)	3 (13)	87 (250)
8	(England) Jack Lane	1925–1931	74 (215)	12 (19)	—	0 (0)	86 (234)
9	(England) Billy Scott	1932–1947	83 (274)	3 (22)	—	0 (0)	86 (296)
10	(Wales) Idris Hopkins	1932–1947	77 (293)	3 (21)	—	0 (0)	80 (314)

==== Golden Boot ====
===== Football League and Premier League =====
- Top-scorer in all competitions amongst League clubs:
  - Steve Phillips – 36 goals (1977–78)
- Level 2:
  - Ivan Toney – 31 goals (2020–21, Championship)
- Level 3:
  - Jim Towers – 32 goals (1958–59, Third Division)
  - Dean Holdsworth – 24 goals (1991–92, Third Division, tied with Iwan Roberts)
- Level 4:
  - Steve Phillips – 32 goals (1977–78, Fourth Division, tied with Alan Curtis)

===== EFL Cup =====
- Dean Holdsworth – 6 goals (1991–92)
- Marcus Forss – 5 goals (2021–22, tied with Eddie Nketiah)

=== Discipline ===
- First red card: Freddy Capper versus Newport County, Third Division South, 11 February 1922
- Most red cards in League matches: 6 – Jamie Bates
- Most Brentford players sent off in a Football League match: 2
  - Terry Johnson and Gordon Sweetzer (versus Rochdale, Fourth Division, 6 December 1975)
  - Jamie Bates and Colin Lee (versus Mansfield Town, Third Division, 12 December 1987)
  - Jamie Bates and Stuart Cash (versus Tranmere Rovers, Third Division, 26 October 1990)
  - Gary Blissett and Marcus Gayle (versus Torquay United, Third Division, 14 December 1991)
  - Jamie Bates and Martin Grainger (versus Bristol Rovers, Second Division, 23 September 1995)
  - Tony Craig and Clayton Donaldson (versus Sheffield United, League One, 16 April 2013)
- Longest suspension incurred by a Brentford player: 5 matches
  - John O'Mara (5 February – 4 March 1972)
  - Alan McCormack (22 October – 26 November 2016)

=== Other player records ===
- Most clean sheets in a League season: 22 – Gordon Phillips (Fourth Division, 1971–72)
- Most top-tier clean sheets: 25 – Joe Crozier
- First player to score a penalty on debut: Andy Sinton (versus Bury, Third Division, 14 December 1985)
- Only player to score on both debuts for the club: Gordon Sweetzer (versus Huddersfield Town, Fourth Division, 27 September 1975 and versus Reading, Third Division, 27 January 1982)
- First substitute to be utilised: Hugh McLaughlin (replaced Billy Cobb versus Oldham Athletic, Third Division, 23 October 1965)
- First substitute to score in a match: Tommy Higginson (versus Millwall, Third Division, 6 November 1965)
- First tactical substitute to be utilised: Eddie Reeve (replaced Keith Hooker versus Newport County, Fourth Division, 26 August 1967)
- First third substitute to be utilised: Craig Ravenscroft (replaced Robert Taylor versus Gillingham, Football League Trophy southern section first round, 8 November 1994)
- First fourth substitute to be utilised: Justin Shaibu (replaced Neal Maupay versus AFC Wimbledon, Football League Cup first round, 8 August 2017)
- First fifth substitute to be utilised: Jan Žambůrek (replaced Christian Nørgaard versus Wigan Athletic, Championship, 4 July 2020)
- First sixth substitute to be utilised: Gustavo Nunes (replaced Yunus Emre Konak versus Brighton & Hove Albion, Premier League, 19 April 2025)
- First substitute to be substituted: Paul Birch (replaced Colin Lee, then replaced by Andy Feeley versus Mansfield Town, Third Division, 2 May 1988)
- Most League substitute appearances: 75 – Sam Saunders
- Most League matches in which substituted: 61 – Sam Saunders
- Most matches as an unused substitute: 182 – Tamer Fernandes
- Most separate contracted spells with the club: 3
  - John Docherty
  - Paul Priddy
- Shortest League career with the club: 1 minute – Max Haygarth
- Shortest career with the club in all competitions: 3 minutes:
  - Reece Cole
  - Nathan Young-Coombes
- First Brentford goal scored with the aid of goal-line technology: Andreas Bjelland (versus Nottingham Forest, Championship, 12 August 2017)
- Tallest player to play in a League match: 6 ft 5 in
  - Kristoffer Ajer
  - Jack Durston
  - Terry Evans
  - Philipp Hofmann
  - Fola Onibuje
- Shortest player to play in a League match: 5 ft 4 in
  - Hughie Reed
  - Billy Stagg
- Most leagues in which played for the club: 4 – Patsy Hendren (Football League Third Division, Football League Third Division South, Southern League First Division, Southern League Second Division)
- Last player born in the 19th century to make a competitive appearance for Brentford: Jack Clough, born 4 November 1898 (versus Bury, Second Division, 5 May 1934)
- First player born in the 20th century to make a competitive appearance for Brentford: George Taylor, born 3 June 1900 (versus Bristol Rovers, Third Division, 13 November 1920)
- First player born in the 21st century to make a competitive appearance for Brentford: Jan Žambůrek, born 13 February 2001 (versus Hull City, Championship, 23 February 2019)

=== Opposition player records ===
- Most League starts versus Brentford: 25 – Geoff Crudgington
- Most League appearances versus Brentford: 31 – Steve Fletcher
- Most League goals versus Brentford: 12 – Harold Blackmore, Dennis Westcott

=== International ===
As of match played 10 June 2026

- First capped player: Joe Connor (for Ireland versus Scotland, 21 March 1903)
- First capped player since Brentford joined the Football League in 1920:
  - Idris Hopkins (for Wales versus Scotland, 21 November 1934)
  - David McCulloch (for Scotland versus Wales, 21 November 1934)
- First capped player for England: Billy Scott (versus Wales, 17 October 1936)
- First capped player to score at full international level: Joe Connor (for Ireland versus Scotland, 21 March 1903)
- Most caps won while contracted to the club: 44 – Frank Onyeka (Nigeria)
- First contracted Brentford player to make an appearance at a major international tournament: Henrik Dalsgaard (Denmark, 2018 World Cup)
- Capped players who failed to make a first team appearance for the club:
  - Kolbeinn Finnsson (Iceland)
  - Daniel O'Shaughnessy (Finland)

=== Transfers ===
==== Record paid ====
As of 1 August 2026.

Rank	Player	Nationality	Fee paid	Transferred from	Date	Notes	Ref.
1	Mamadou Sangaré	Mali	Undisclosed	(France) Lens	1 August 2026	(Note: Reported to be between £38,500,000 and €48,000,000.)	
2	Dango Ouattara	Burkina Faso	£37,000,000	(England) Bournemouth	16 August 2025	(Note: Reported to be £37,000,000, plus an additional £5,000,000 in add-ons.)	
3	Igor Thiago	Brazil	£30,000,000	(Belgium) Club Brugge	14 February 2024	(Note: Reported to be "an initial" £30,000,000.)	
4	Fábio Carvalho	Portugal	£27,500,000	(England) Liverpool	12 August 2024		
5	Nathan Collins	Republic of Ireland	£23,000,000	(England) Wolverhampton Wanderers	4 July 2023		

===== Progression of record fee paid =====
Player	Nationality	Fee paid	Transferred from	Date	Notes	Ref.
Mamadou Sangaré	Mali	Undisclosed	(France) Lens	1 August 2026		
Dango Ouattara	Burkina Faso	£37,000,000	(England) Bournemouth	16 August 2025		
Igor Thiago	Brazil	£30,000,000	(Belgium) Club Brugge	14 February 2024		
Nathan Collins	Republic of Ireland	£23,000,000	(England) Wolverhampton Wanderers	4 July 2023		
Kevin Schade	Germany	£22,000,000	(Germany) SC Freiburg	12 June 2023	(Note: Reported to be "in the region of" £22,000,000.)	
Keane Lewis-Potter	England	£16,000,000	(England) Hull City	12 July 2022	(Note: Reported to be £16,000,000, "potentially rising to" £20,000,000 with add-ons.)	
Aaron Hickey	Scotland	£14,000,000	(Italy) Bologna	9 July 2022	(Note: Reported to be £14,000,000, rising to £19,000,000 with add-ons.)	
Kristoffer Ajer	Norway	£13,500,000	(Scotland) Celtic	21 July 2021		
Frank Onyeka	Nigeria	Undisclosed	(Denmark) Midtjylland	20 July 2021	(Note: Reported to be £8,500,000.)	
Ivan Toney	England	Undisclosed	(England) Peterborough United	1 September 2020	(Note: Reported to be £5,000,000, rising to £10,000,000 with add-ons.)	
Bryan Mbeumo	France	Undisclosed	(France) Troyes	5 August 2019	(Note: Reported to be £5,850,000.)	
Pontus Jansson	Sweden	Undisclosed	(England) Leeds United	8 July 2019	(Note: Reported to be £5,500,000, plus add-ons.)	
Mathias Jensen	Denmark	Undisclosed	(Spain) Celta Vigo	10 July 2019	(Note: Reported to be £3,500,000.)	
Ezri Konsa	England	Undisclosed	(England) Charlton Athletic	12 June 2018	(Note: Reported to be £2,850,000.)	
Sergi Canós	Spain	Undisclosed	(England) Norwich City	31 January 2017	(Note: Reported to be £2,500,000. Club record fee for a teenager.)	
Andreas Bjelland	Denmark	Undisclosed	(Netherlands) Twente	2 July 2015	(Note: Reported to be £2,100,000.)	
Jota	Spain	Undisclosed	(Spain) Celta Vigo	15 August 2014	(Note: Reported to be £1,500,000.)	
Moses Odubajo	England	Undisclosed	(England) Leyton Orient	27 June 2014	(Note: Reported to be £1,000,000.)	
Hermann Hreiðarsson	Iceland	£750,000	(England) Crystal Palace	September 1998		
Joe Allon	England	£250,000	(England) Chelsea	November 1992		
Eddie May	Scotland	£167,000	(Scotland) Hibernian	July 1989		
Simon Ratcliffe	England	£100,000	(England) Norwich City	January 1989		
Alan Whitehead	England	£78,000	(England) Bury	July 1981		
Tony Funnell	England	£50,000	(England) Gillingham	March 1980		
Jim McNichol	Scotland	£33,000	(England) Luton Town	October 1978		
Andy McCulloch	England	£25,000	(England) Oxford United	March 1976		
John Dick	Scotland	£17,500	(England) West Ham United	September 1962		
Tommy Lawton	England	£16,000	(England) Notts County	March 1952		
Ron Greenwood	England	£9,500	(England) Bradford Park Avenue	March 1949		
Jackie Gibbons	England	£8,000	(England) Bradford Park Avenue	August 1947		
Dave McCulloch	Scotland	£6,000	(Scotland) Heart of Midlothian	November 1935		
George Poyser	England	£1,550	(England) Port Vale	July 1934		
Baden Herod	England	£1,500	(England) Charlton Athletic	July 1928		
Ernie Watkins	England	£1,000	(England) Southend United	January 1926		

==== Record received ====
As of 1 September 2025.

Rank	Player	Nationality	Fee received	Transferred to	Date	Notes	Ref.
1	Bryan Mbeumo	Cameroon	£65,000,000	(England) Manchester United	21 July 2025	(Note: Reported to be £65,000,000, rising to £71,000,000 with add-ons. Mbeumo's former club Troyes received a €7.4 million sell-on and €2 million "in training compensation and solidarity payments".)	
2	Yoane Wissa	DR Congo	£50,000,000	(England) Newcastle United	1 September 2025	(Note: Reported to be £50,000,000, rising to £55,000,000 with add-ons.)	
3	Ivan Toney	England	£40,000,000	(Saudi Arabia) Al-Ahli	31 August 2024	(Note: Brentford paid Toney's former club Peterborough United a percentage of the fee, of which 30% was paid by Peterborough United to Toney's prior club Newcastle United.)	
4	Ollie Watkins	England	£28,000,000	(England) Aston Villa	9 September 2020	(Note: Reported to be £28,000,000, rising to £33,000,000 with add-ons. 15% of the fee went to Watkins' previous club Exeter City.)	
5	David Raya	Spain	£27,000,000	(England) Arsenal	4 July 2024	(Note: Brentford received an additional £3 million fee to enable Raya's season-long loan to Arsenal during the 2023–24 season. Raya's former club Blackburn Rovers received an approximate £5 million sell-on.)	

===== Progression of record fee received =====
Player	Nationality	Fee received	Transferred to	Date	Notes	Ref.
Bryan Mbeumo	Cameroon	£65,000,000	(England) Manchester United	21 July 2025		
Ivan Toney	England	£40,000,000	(Saudi Arabia) Al-Ahli	31 August 2024		
Ollie Watkins	England	£28,000,000	(England) Aston Villa	9 September 2020		
Neal Maupay	France	Undisclosed	(England) Brighton & Hove Albion	5 August 2019	(Note: Reported to be £16,000,000.)	
Chris Mepham	Wales	Undisclosed	(England) Bournemouth	22 January 2019	(Note: Reported to be £12,000,000.)	
Scott Hogan	Republic of Ireland	Undisclosed	(England) Aston Villa	31 January 2017	(Note: Reported to be £9,500,000, rising to £12,000,000 with add-ons. 30% of the fee went to Hogan's previous club Rochdale.)	
Andre Gray	England	Undisclosed	(England) Burnley	21 August 2015	(Note: Reported to be £9,000,000. Approximately £1,100,000 of the fee went to Gray's previous club Luton Town. Brentford received 27.5% of the fee paid when Gray transferred from Burnley to Watford in August 2017, of which 15% was payable to Luton Town.)	
Adam Forshaw	England	Undisclosed	(England) Wigan Athletic	1 September 2014	(Note: Reported to be over £3,000,000.)	
Hermann Hreiðarsson	Iceland	£2,500,000	(England) Wimbledon	October 1999		
Dean Holdsworth	England	£720,000	(England) Wimbledon	July 1993	(Note: Brentford received Mickey Bennett and Detsi Kruszyński from Wimbledon as part of the deal. £100,000 of the fee went to Holdsworth's previous club Watford.)	
Andy Sinton	England	£350,000	(England) Queens Park Rangers	March 1989	(Note: Brentford received an additional £350,000 sell-on fee from Sinton's £2,750,000 transfer to Sheffield Wednesday in August 1993.)	
Roger Joseph	England	£150,000	(England) Wimbledon	August 1988		
Terry Hurlock	England	£95,000	(England) Reading	February 1986		
Andy McCulloch	England	£60,000	(England) Sheffield Wednesday	June 1979		
Stewart Houston	Scotland	£55,000	(England) Manchester United	December 1973	(Note: £13,000 of the fee went to Houston's previous club Chelsea.)	
John O'Mara	England	£50,000	(England) Blackburn Rovers	September 1972		
Roger Cross	England	£30,000	(England) Fulham	September 1971		
John Docherty	Scotland	£17,000	(England) Sheffield United	March 1961		
Jack Chisholm	England	£16,000	(England) Sheffield United	March 1948		
Dave McCulloch	Scotland	£9,500	(England) Derby County	October 1938		
Baden Herod	England	£4,000	(England) Tottenham Hotspur	February 1929		
Joe Wiggins	England	£1,400	(England) Leicester City	April 1928		
Harry Morris	England	£750	(England) Millwall Athletic	February 1923		
Tommy Shanks	Ireland	£200	(England) Woolwich Arsenal	January 1903	(Note: £100 of the fee went to Shanks' previous club Derby County, who still held his league registration. Joe Connor was also transferred to Woolwich Arsenal as part of the deal.)	

==== Other records ====
- Record fee paid for a goalkeeper: £12,500,000 (Caoimhín Kelleher from Liverpool, 3 June 2025) (Note: An initial £12,500,000 fee, rising to possibly £18,000,000 with add-ons.)
- Record fee received for a goalkeeper: £27,000,000 (David Raya to Arsenal, 4 July 2024)
- Record fee paid for a player over 30 years of age: £100,000 (Gary Alexander from Millwall, 5 August 2010)
- Record fee received for a player over 30 years of age: £10,000,000 (Christian Nørgaard to Arsenal, 10 July 2025) (Note: An initial £10,000,000 fee, rising to possibly £15,000,000 with add-ons.)
- First player signed on loan: Dennis Edwards (from Portsmouth, September 1967)

== Managerial records ==
=== Most matches ===
As of match played 25 May 2025. Competitive matches only.

No.	Name	Years	Total matches	Wins	Draws	Losses	Winning percentage	Notes	Ref.
1	(England) Harry Curtis	1926–1949	707	306	157	245	43.28		
2	(Scotland) Malky MacDonald	1957–1965	386	163	95	128	42.23		
3	(England) Fred Halliday	1908–1912; 1915–1921; 1924–1926	334	108	70	156	32.34		
4	(Denmark) Thomas Frank	2018–2025	317	132	77	108	41.64	(Note: Owing to Thomas Frank testing positive for COVID-19, Brentford B head coach Neil MacFarlane presided over a 1–0 FA Cup victory over Middlesbrough on 9 January 2021.)	
5	(England) David Webb	1993–1997	227	91	66	70	40.09		
6	(England) Fred Callaghan	1980–1984	203	69	57	77	33.99		
7	(England) Steve Perryman	1987–1990	193	79	48	66	40.93		
8	(England) Bill Dodgin, Jr.	1976–1980	184	73	37	74	39.67		
9	(England) Bill Dodgin, Sr.	1953–1957	183	65	57	61	35.52		
10	(England) Phil Holder	1990–1993	178	78	35	65	43.82		

=== Most wins ===
As of match played 25 May 2025. Competitive matches only.

No.	Name	Years	Wins	Draws	Losses	Winning percentage	Total matches	Notes	Ref.
1	(England) Harry Curtis	1926–1949	306	157	245	43.28	707		
2	(Scotland) Malky MacDonald	1957–1965	163	95	128	42.23	386		
3	(Denmark) Thomas Frank	2018–2025	132	77	108	41.64	317		
4	(England) Fred Halliday	1908–1912; 1915–1921; 1924–1926	108	70	156	32.34	334		
5	(England) David Webb	1993–1997	91	66	70	40.09	227		
6	(England) Steve Perryman	1987–1990	79	48	66	40.93	193		
7	(England) Phil Holder	1990–1993	78	35	65	43.82	178		
8	(England) Bill Dodgin, Jr.	1976–1980	73	37	74	39.67	184		
9	(England) Frank Blunstone	1969–1973; 1984	70	36	67	40.46	173	(Note: Blunstone's 1984 spell was as caretaker manager.)	
10	(England) Fred Callaghan	1980–1984	69	57	77	33.99	203		

=== Most points ===
As of match played 25 May 2025. League matches only, adjusted to 3 points for a win.

No.	Name	Years	Points	Wins	Draws	Losses	Points per game	Winning percentage	Total matches	Notes	Ref.
1	(England) Harry Curtis	1926–1949	1002	284	150	226	1.52	43.03	660		
2	(Scotland) Malky MacDonald	1957–1965	533	149	86	116	1.52	42.45	351		
3	(Denmark) Thomas Frank	2018–2025	466	130	76	106	1.49	41.67	274		
4	(England) Fred Halliday	1908–1912; 1915–1921; 1924–1926	377	103	68	150	1.17	32.09	321		
5	(England) David Webb	1993–1997	275	73	56	55	1.49	39.67	184		
6	(England) Bill Dodgin, Jr.	1976–1980	247	70	37	65	1.44	40.7	172		
7	(England) Frank Blunstone	1969–1973; 1984	233	66	35	62	1.43	40.49	163		
8	(England) Bill Dodgin, Sr.	1953–1957	232	60	52	57	1.37	35.5	169		
9	(England) Fred Callaghan	1980–1984	227	59	50	61	1.34	34.71	170		
10	(England) Steve Perryman	1987–1990	226	61	43	55	1.42	38.36	159		

=== Highest winning percentage ===
As of match played 25 May 2025. 75 or more competitive matches only.

No.	Name	Years	Winning percentage	Wins	Draws	Losses	Total matches	Notes	Ref.
1	(England) Mark Warburton	2013–2015	53.85	42	14	22	78		
2	(Germany) Uwe Rösler	2011–2013	44.12	60	40	36	136		
3	(England) Dusty Rhodes	1912–1915	43.68	38	19	30	87		
4	(England) Martin Allen	2004–2006	43.55	54	36	34	124		
5	(England) Dick Molyneux	1903–1904; 1904–1906	43.33	39	24	34	90	(Note: In March 1904, Dick Molyneux was suspended until the end of the 1903–04 season for illegally trying to buy goalkeeper John Bishop out of the Army.)	
6	(England) Harry Curtis	1926–1949	43.28	306	157	245	707		
7	(Scotland) Malky MacDonald	1957–1965	42.23	163	95	128	386		
8	(Denmark) Thomas Frank	2018–2025	41.64	132	77	108	317		
9	(England) Steve Perryman	1987–1990	40.93	79	48	66	193		
10	(England) Andy Scott	2007–2011	40.48	68	50	50	168	(Note: Initially as caretaker manager.)	

=== Lowest winning percentage ===
As of match played 25 May 2025. Permanent managers only.

No.	Name	Years	Winning percentage	Wins	Draws	Losses	Total matches	Notes	Ref.
1	(Sierra Leone) Leroy Rosenior	2006	13.04	3	10	10	23		
2	(Republic of Ireland) Scott Fitzgerald	2006–2007	16	4	5	16	25		
3	(England) Micky Adams	1997–1998	21.21	7	15	11	33		
4	(England) Terry Butcher	2007	21.74	5	5	13	23		
5	(Netherlands) Marinus Dijkhuizen	2015	22.22	2	2	5	9		
6	(England) Tommy Lawton	1953	25.81	8	9	14	31		
7	(England) Eddie May	1997	26.32	5	5	9	19		
8	(England) Mike Everitt	1973–1975	29.49	23	22	33	78		
9	(England) Wally Downes	2002–2004	30.21	29	21	46	96		
10	(Scotland) Jimmy Bain	1952–1953	30.43	7	5	11	23		

=== Other manager records ===
- First person to win promotion with Brentford as a player and manager: Andy Scott (1998–99 Third Division as a player, 2008–09 League Two as manager)

== Club records ==
=== Matches ===
==== Firsts ====
- First match: 1–1 versus Kew, friendly, 23 November 1889
- First London League match: 6–1 versus Fulham, Second Division, 3 October 1896
- First FA Cup match: 6–1 versus 1st Coldstream Guards, first qualifying round, 25 September 1897
- First Southern League match: 6–1 versus St Albans, Second Division, 10 September 1898
- First Football League match: 0–3 versus Exeter City, Third Division South, 28 August 1920
- First Football League match played at neutral ground: 0–3 versus Clapton Orient, Third Division South, Wembley Stadium, 22 November 1930
- First match at Griffin Park: versus Plymouth Argyle, Western League First Division, 1 September 1904
- First competitive floodlit match at Griffin Park: versus Swindon Town, Third Division South, 12 March 1956
- First EFL Cup match: 4–3 versus Sunderland, second round, 25 October 1960
- First EFL Trophy match: 4–3 versus Leyton Orient, first round, 21 February 1984
- First EFL play-offs match: 2–2 versus Tranmere Rovers, Third Division, 19 May 1991
- First Anglo-Italian Cup match: 2–1 versus Swindon Town, preliminary round, 16 September 1992

==== Record wins ====
- Record London League win: 9–1 versus Bromley, First Division, 7 April 1898
- Record Southern League win: 11–1 versus Wycombe Wanderers, Second Division, 16 February 1901 (Note: Also club record Southern League home win.)
- Record Southern League away win: 9–1 versus Southall, Second Division, 19 January 1901
- Record League win: 9–0 versus Wrexham, Third Division, 15 October 1963 (Note: Also club record League home win.)
- Record League away win:
  - 6–0 versus Southampton, Third Division, 9 March 1959
  - 7–1 versus Exeter City, Third Division, 23 April 1983
- Record FA Cup win: 8–0 versus Uxbridge, third qualifying round, 31 October 1903 (Note: Also club record FA Cup home win.)
- Record FA Cup away win: 6–1 vs Ilford, first round, 29 November 1930
- Record EFL Cup win:
  - Home: 7–0 versus Oldham Athletic, third round, 21 September 2021
  - Away: 1–6 versus Birmingham City, second round, 26 August 2026
- Record EFL Trophy win:
  - 6–0 versus Newport County, semi-final, 17 May 1985
  - 6–0 versus Bournemouth, southern area quarter-final, 8 November 2011

==== Highest-scoring draws ====
- Highest scoring Southern League draw: 3–3 on four occasions
- Highest scoring League draw: 5–5 versus Luton Town, Third Division South, 1 February 1933
- Highest scoring home League draw: 3–3 on 26 occasions, most recently versus Liverpool, Premier League, 25 September 2021 (Note: A League One play-off semi-final second leg versus Swindon Town, played at home on 6 May 2013, finished 3–3 after extra time.)
- Highest scoring away League draw: 5–5 versus Luton Town, Third Division South, 1 February 1933
- Highest scoring draw (all competitions): 6–6 after extra time versus Dagenham & Redbridge, Football League Cup first round, 12 August 2014 (Note: National record.)

==== Record defeats ====
- Record London League defeat: 1–3 versus Queens Park Rangers, Second Division, 22 April 1897
- Record Southern League defeat: 0–9 versus Coventry City, First Division, 27 December 1911 (Note: Also club record Southern League away defeat.)
- Record Southern League home defeat:
  - 0–5 versus Grays United, Second Division, 8 February 1900
  - 0–5 versus Portsmouth, First Division, 14 February 1903
- Record League defeat: (Note: Also joint-club record League away defeat.)
  - 0–7 versus Swansea Town, Third Division South, 8 November 1924
  - 0–7 versus Walsall, Third Division South, 19 January 1957
  - 0–7 versus Peterborough United, League Two, 24 November 2007
- Record League home defeat:
  - 1–6 versus Brighton & Hove Albion, Third Division South, 12 September 1925
  - 0–5 versus Bristol Rovers, Third Division, 5 February 1966
- Record FA Cup defeat: 1–7 versus Manchester United, third round, 14 January 1928 (Note: Also club record FA Cup away defeat.)
- Record FA Cup defeat to non-League opposition (since 1920):
  - 3–1 versus Kingstonian (first round, 18 November 2000)
  - 5–3 versus St Albans (fifth qualifying round, 29 November 1924)
- Record EFL Cup defeat:
  - 0–5 versus Charlton Athletic, first round, second leg, 12 August 1980
  - 0–5 versus Cheltenham Town, first round, 23 August 2005
  - 0–5 versus Derby County, second round, 27 August 2013
- Record EFL Trophy defeat: 0–4 versus Wycombe Wanderers, southern area first round, 19 January 1988

==== Other ====
- Most matches in all competitions in a League season: 63 – 1988–89 (46 Third Division, 8 FA Cup, 4 Football League Cup, 5 Football League Trophy)
- Most goals scored for in a League defeat: 4
  - 4–6 versus Southampton, Third Division South, 21 August 1954
  - 4–5 versus Blackpool, Third Division, 13 October 1979
  - 4–5 versus Bradford City, Third Division, 23 March 1985

=== Sequences ===
==== Wins ====
- Consecutive Southern League wins: 9 (13 September 1913 – 20 December 1913) (Note: Also club record consecutive Southern League wins in a single season.)
- Consecutive home Southern League wins: 7 (10 November 1900 – 9 April 1901)
- Consecutive away Southern League wins: 4 (13 September 1913 – 20 December 1913)
- Consecutive League wins: 9 (30 April – 24 September 1932)
- Consecutive League wins in a single season: 8
  - 26 November 2013 – 11 January 2014
  - 7 March – 15 July 2020
- Consecutive home League wins: 21 (31 August 1929 – 21 April 1930)
- Consecutive away League wins: 5
  - 21 April – 29 August 1956
  - 24 October – 28 December 1981
  - 20 April – 24 August 1991
  - 16 October – 11 December 2010
  - 4 January – 15 March 2025

==== Draws ====
- Consecutive Southern League draws: 3
  - 24 February 1900 – 17 March 1900
  - 11 February 1905 – 25 February 1905
  - 4 November 1905 – 18 November 1905
  - 22 February 1913 – 5 March 1913
  - 20 September 1919 – 27 September 1919
- Consecutive home Southern League draws: 3
  - 14 October 1911 – 11 November 1911
  - 25 December 1914 – 30 January 1915
  - 27 September 1919 – 1 November 1919
- Consecutive away Southern League draws: 3 (24 November 1906 – 22 December 1906)
- Consecutive League draws: 5
  - 16 March – 6 April 1957
  - 3 March – 18 April 2026
- Consecutive home League draws: 4
  - 10 January – 28 February 1925
  - 2 – 30 April 1927
  - 25 December 1931 – 30 January 1932
  - 3 – 22 April 1953
  - 11 April – 25 March 1961
  - 26 February – 2 April 1994
  - 21 December 1996 – 8 February 1997
- Consecutive away League draws: 6 (27 December 1980 – 7 March 1981)
- Consecutive draws in all competitions: 6 (3 March – 18 April 2026)

==== Defeats ====
- Consecutive Southern League defeats: 11 (19 April 1902 – 8 November 1902)
- Consecutive Southern League defeats in a single season: 9 (6 September – 8 November 1902)
- Consecutive Southern League home defeats: 5 (6 December 1902 – 24 January 1903)
- Consecutive Southern League away defeats: 18 (19 April 1902 – 5 September 1903)
- Consecutive Southern League away defeats in a single season: 15 (6 September 1902 – 18 April 1903)
- Consecutive League defeats: 9
  - 13 April – 12 September 1925
  - 20 October – 25 December 1928
- Consecutive home League defeats: 6
  - 25 April – 26 September 1925
  - 9 January – 20 March 1993
- Consecutive away League defeats: 15 (16 September 1972 – 10 March 1973)

==== Without defeat ====
- Most Southern League matches without defeat: 21 (21 April 1900 – 7 September 1901)
- Most home Southern League matches without defeat: 22 (22 January 1910 – 11 February 1911)
- Most away Southern League matches without defeat: 10 (30 April 1900 – 7 September 1901)
- Best-ever run of Southern League results: 18 wins, 4 draws (21 April 1900 – 7 September 1901)
- Most League matches without defeat: 26 (20 February – 16 October 1999)
- Most home League matches without defeat: 29 (20 January 1996 – 4 March 1997)
- Most away League matches without defeat: 12 (20 February – 2 October 1999)
- Best-ever run of League results: 16 wins, 3 draws (19 October 2013 – 22 February 2014)

==== Without a win ====
- Most Southern League matches without a win: 11
  - 19 April – 8 November 1902
  - 6 December 1902 – 21 February 1903
- Most home Southern League matches without a win: 7 (6 December 1902 – 14 February 1903)
- Most away Southern League matches without a win: 35 (7 September 1901 – 17 October 1903)
- Most League matches without a win: 18 (9 September – 26 December 2006)
- Most home League matches without a win: 13 (5 February – 16 September 2000)
- Most away League matches without a win: 21
  - 24 April 1965 – 16 April 1966
  - 22 April 1997 – 3 March 1998

==== Without a draw ====
- Most Southern League matches without a draw: 20
  - 20 April 1912 – 21 December 1912
  - 8 March 1913 – 20 December 1913
- Most home Southern League matches without a draw: 19
  - 18 January 1902 – 31 January 1903
  - 4 January 1913 – 11 April 1914
- Most away Southern League matches without a draw: 19 (19 April 1902 – 19 September 1903)
- Most League matches without a draw: 27 (2 May 1998 – 30 January 1999)
- Most home League matches without a draw: 25 (27 April 1929 – 17 September 1930)
- Most away League matches without a draw: 44 (25 August 1923 – 5 September 1925)

==== Scoring ====
- Most Southern League matches without failing to score a goal: 13 (10 November 1900 – 7 September 1901)
- Most Southern League matches without failing to score a home goal: 17 (14 February – 27 December 1910)
- Most Southern League matches without failing to score an away goal: 10 (16 April 1900 – 30 March 1901)
- Most Southern League matches without scoring a goal: 8 (26 March 1904 – 24 September 1904)
- Most Southern League matches without scoring a home goal: 3
  - 2 April – 1 October 1904
  - 21 September – 9 November 1912
- Most Southern League matches without scoring an away goal: 5
  - 26 March – 24 September 1904
  - 27 December 1911 – 2 March 1912
- Most League matches without failing to score a goal: 26 (4 March – 14 September 1963)
- Most League matches without failing to score a home goal: 41 (21 August 1962 – 28 March 1964)
- Most League matches without failing to score an away goal: 17 (7 January – 4 November 1933)
- Most League matches without scoring a goal: 7 (7 March – 8 April 2000)
- Most League matches without scoring a home goal: 6 (30 January – 27 March 1993)
- Most League matches without scoring an away goal: 9 (14 October 2006 – 20 January 2007)
- Most consecutive Southern League matches in which scored three goals or more: 5 (18 October – 20 December 1913)
- Most consecutive Southern League matches in which scored four goals or more (all competitions): 4 (8 January – 19 February 1898)
- Most consecutive League matches in which scored three goals or more (all competitions): 5 (12 January – 5 February 2019)
- Most consecutive penalties scored (all competitions): 32 (28 October 2019 – 6 March 2023)

==== Clean sheets ====
- Most consecutive Southern League clean sheets: 5
  - 5 – 28 March 1910
  - 26 December 1913 – 7 February 1914
- Most consecutive home Southern League clean sheets: 5
  - 5 April – 18 September 1912
  - 6 December 1911 – 1914 March 1914
- Most consecutive away Southern League clean sheets: 5 (11 October 1913 – 7 February 1914)
- Most Southern League games without a clean sheet: 20 (22 February – 22 November 1902)
- Most home Southern League games without a clean sheet: 9
  - 10 September 1898 – 8 April 1899
  - 1 March – 22 November 1902
- Most away Southern League games without a clean sheet: 33 (14 September 1901 – 7 November 1903)
- Most consecutive League clean sheets: 9 (1 October – 9 November 1957)
- Most consecutive home League clean sheets: 8 (14 January – 22 April 1950)
- Most consecutive away League clean sheets: 4
  - 28 February – 13 April 1935
  - 25 August – 11 September 1948
  - 8 September – 10 October 1979
  - 6 September – 8 October 1980
  - 5 October – 22 November 1991
  - 2 November – 21 December 2013
- Most League games without a clean sheet: 20
  - 21 April – 10 November 1923
  - 25 September 1954 – 19 February 1955
  - 29 September 1984 – 26 January 1985
  - 5 February–20 August 1994
  - 23 September 2006 – 20 January 2007
- Most home League games without a clean sheet: 16
  - 3 March – 20 October 1956
  - 19 May 2024 – 8 March 2025
- Most away League games without a clean sheet: 34 (17 March 1928 – 26 December 1929)

==== Other ====
- Most consecutive London derbies without defeat in League matches: 14 (19 October 2022 – 4 November 2023)
- Most consecutive away wins in London derbies in League matches: 4

=== League records ===
==== Southern League (1898–1920) ====
===== Wins in a season =====
- Most Southern League wins in a season: 20 – 1913–14 (Second Division)
- Most Southern League home wins in a season: 14 – 1906–07 (First Division)
- Most Southern League away wins in a season: 7 – 1900–01, 1913–14 (Second Division)
- Fewest Southern League wins in a season: 2 – 1902–03 (First Division)
- Fewest Southern League home wins in a season: 2 – 1902–03 (First Division)
- Fewest Southern League away wins in a season: 0 – 1901–02, 1902–03 (First Division)

===== Draws in a season =====
- Most Southern League draws in a season: 9 – 1904–05, 1909–10, 1910–11, 1911–12 (First Division)
- Most Southern League home draws in a season: 7 – 1904–05 (First Division)
- Most Southern League away draws in a season: 5 – 1903–04, 1906–07, 1919–20 (First Division)
- Least Southern League draws in a season: 1 – 1902–03 (First Division)
- Fewest Southern League home draws in a season: 1 – 1900–01, 1902–03 (First Division), 1912–13 (Second Division)
- Fewest Southern League away draws in a season: 0 – 1902–03 (First Division)

===== Defeats in a season =====
- Most Southern League defeats in a season: 27 – 1902–03 (First Division)
- Most Southern League home defeats in a season: 12 – 1902–03 (First Division)
- Most Southern League away defeats in a season: 16 – 1907–08, 1912–13 (First Division)
- Fewest Southern League defeats in a season: 0 – 1900–01 (Second Division)
- Fewest Southern League home defeats in a season: 0 – 1900–01 (Second Division)
- Fewest Southern League away defeats in a season: 0 – 1900–01 (Second Division)

==== Football League and Premier League (1920–present) ====
===== Wins in a season =====
- Most League wins in a season: 28 – 1929–30 (Third Division South), 2013–14 (League One)
- Most League home wins in a season: 21 – 1929–30 (Third Division South) (Note: League record.)
- Most League away wins in a season: 12 – 1996–97 (Second Division)
- Fewest League wins in a season: 8 – 2006–07 (League One)
- Fewest League home wins in a season: 5 – 1946–47 (First Division), 2006–07 (League One)
- Fewest League away wins in a season: 1 – 1921–22, 1924–25 (Third Division South), 1953–54 (Second Division), 1964–65 (Third Division)

===== Draws in a season =====
- Most League draws in a season: 19 – 1980–81 (Third Division), 1993–94 (Second Division)
- Most League home draws in a season: 11 – 1996–97 (Second Division)
- Most League away draws in a season: 10 – 1958–59, 1963–64, 1980–81 (Third Division)
- Fewest League draws in a season: 5 – 1929–30 (Third Division South)
- Fewest League home draws in a season: 0 – 1929–30 (Third Division South)
- Fewest League away draws in a season: 0 – 1923–24, 1924–25 (Third Division South)

===== Defeats in a season =====
- Most League defeats in a season: 26 – 1924–25 (Third Division South), 1946–47 (First Division)
- Most League home defeats in a season: 11 – 1946–47 (First Division)
- Most League away defeats in a season: 20 – 1924–25 (Third Division South)
- Fewest League defeats in a season: 6 – 1932–33 (Third Division South)
- Fewest League home defeats in a season: 0 – 1929–30 (Third Division South), 1934–35 (Second Division)
- Fewest League away defeats in a season: 4 – 1932–33 (Third Division South)

===== Superior away records =====
- Seasons in which the club won more points away from home than at home:
  - 1980–81, Third Division, 24 points won away, 23 won at home (Note: 2 points for a win.)
  - 1981–82, Third Division, 38 points won away, 30 won at home
  - 1985–86, Third Division, 34 points won away, 32 won at home
  - 1996–97, Second Division, 39 points won away, 35 won at home
  - 2007–08, League Two, 33 points won away, 26 won at home

==== Other home/away records ====
- Identical home and away records:
  - 1900–01, Southern League Second Division, 7 wins, 1 draw, 0 losses
  - 2005–06, Football League One, 10 wins, 8 draws, 5 losses

=== Goals ===
==== Southern League (1898–1920) ====
===== Scored in a match =====
- Most goals scored in a home Southern League win: 11
  - 11–1 versus Wycombe Wanderers, Second Division, 16 February 1901
- Most goals scored in an away Southern League win: 9
  - 9–1 versus Southall, Second Division, 19 January 1901

===== Conceded in a match =====
- Most goals conceded in a home Southern League defeat: 5
  - 0–5 versus Grays United, Second Division, 8 February 1900
  - 0–5 versus Portsmouth, First Division, 14 February 1903
- Most goals conceded in an away Southern League defeat: 9
  - 0–9 versus Coventry City, First Division, 27 December 1911

===== Scored in a season =====
- Most Southern League goals scored in a season: 80 – 1913–14 (Second Division)
- Most home Southern League goals scored in a season: 52 – 1913–14 (Second Division)
- Most away Southern League goals scored in a season: 28 – 1913–14 (Second Division)
- Fewest Southern League goals scored in a season: 25 – 1902–03 (First Division)
- Fewest home Southern League goals scored in a season: 10 – 1902–03 (First Division)
- Fewest away Southern League goals scored in a season: 7 – 1899–1900 (Second Division)

===== Conceded in a season =====
- Most Southern League goals conceded in a season: 103 – 1902–03 (First Division)
- Most home Southern League goals conceded in a season: 36 – 1902–03 (First Division)
- Most away Southern League goals conceded in a season: 67 – 1902–03 (First Division)
- Fewest Southern League goals conceded in a season: 11 – 1900–01 (Second Division)
- Fewest home Southern League goals conceded in a season: 3 – 1913–14 (Second Division)
- Fewest away Southern League goals conceded in a season: 5 – 1900–01 (Second Division)

===== Goal difference =====
- Highest positive overall goal difference in a Southern League season: +62 – 1913–14 (Second Division)
- Highest positive home goal difference in a Southern League season: +49 – 1913–14 (Second Division)
- Highest positive away goal difference in a Southern League season: +22 – 1900–01 (Second Division)
- Highest final league placing with a negative goal difference in a Southern League season: 7th, -10 – 1914–15 (Second Division)
- Lowest negative overall goal difference in a Southern League season: -68 – 1902–03 (First Division)
- Lowest negative home goal difference in a Southern League season: -26 – 1902–03 (First Division)
- Lowest negative away goal difference in a Southern League season: -50 – 1902–03 (First Division)
- Lowest final league placing with a positive goal difference in a Southern League season: 10th, +1 – 1906–07 (First Division)

===== Aggregate scores =====
- Highest home Southern League League aggregate score: 12
  - 11–1 versus Wycombe Wanderers, Second Division, 16 February 1901
- Highest away Southern League aggregate score: 11
  - 4–7 versus West Ham United, First Division, 21 October 1911

===== Goalless draws =====
- Most goalless draws in a Southern League season: 5 – 1909–10 (First Division)

===== Goalscorers =====
- Most goalscorers in a Southern League season (all competitions): 13 – 1913–14 (First Division)
- Most goalscorers in a Southern League match: 5
  - Ralph McElhaney, E. Andrews, Joe Turner, Peter Turnbull and Roddy McLeod (versus Wycombe Wanderers, Second Division, 16 February 1901)
  - Jack Chapman, Patsy Hendren, Tommy Clark, Joe Johnson, Bobby Jackson (versus Ton Pentre, Second Division, 4 October 1913)
- Fewest goalscorers in a Southern League season (all competitions): 7 – 1900–01 (Second Division)
- Most hat-tricks in a Southern League season (all competitions): 6 – 1913–14 (First Division)

==== Football League and Premier League (1920–present) ====
===== Scored in a match =====
- Most goals scored in a home League win: 9
  - 9–0 versus Wrexham, Third Division, 15 October 1963
- Most goals scored in an away League win: 7
  - 7–1 versus Exeter City, Third Division, 23 April 1983

===== Conceded in a match =====
- Most goals conceded in a home League defeat: 6
  - 1–6 versus Brighton & Hove Albion, Third Division South, 12 September 1925
  - 2–6 versus Manchester City, First Division, 3 April 1937
  - 2–6 versus Luton Town, Third Division, 8 February 1964
  - 2–6 versus Bristol Rovers, Second Division, 28 August 2000
- Most goals conceded in an away League defeat: 7
  - 1–7 versus Plymouth Argyle, Third Division South, 6 September 1924
  - 0–7 versus Swansea Town, Third Division South, 8 November 1924
  - 1–7 versus Reading, Third Division South, 1 May 1926
  - 2–7 versus Grimsby Town, Second Division, 11 November 1950
  - 0–7 versus Walsall, Third Division South, 19 January 1957
  - 0–7 versus Peterborough United, League Two, 24 November 2007

===== Scored in a season =====
- Most goals scored in a season (all competitions): 107 – 1982–83 (Third Division)
- Most League goals scored in a season: 98 – 1962–63 (Fourth Division)
- Most home League goals scored in a season: 66 – 1929–30 (Third Division South)
- Most away League goals scored in a season: 45 – 1932–33 (Third Division South)
- Fewest League goals scored in a season: 38 – 1924–25 (Third Division South)
- Fewest home League goals scored in a season: 19 – 1946–47 (Fourth Division)
- Fewest away League goals scored in a season: 10 – 1924–25 (Third Division South)

===== Conceded in a season =====
- Most League goals conceded in a season: 94 – 1925–26 (Third Division South)
- Most home League goals conceded in a season: 41 – 2006–07 (League One)
- Most away League goals conceded in a season: 65 – 1924–25 (Third Division South)
- Fewest League goals conceded in a season: 39 – 1969–70 (Fourth Division), 1994–95 (Second Division)
- Fewest home League goals conceded in a season: 11 – 1969–70 (Fourth Division)
- Fewest away League goals conceded in a season: 21 – 1996–97 (Second Division)

===== Goal difference =====
- Highest positive overall goal difference in a League season: +50 – 1929–30 (Third Division South)
- Highest positive home goal difference in a League season: +54 – 1929–30 (Third Division South)
- Highest positive away goal difference in a League season: +15 – 1932–33 (Third Division South)
- Highest final league placing with a negative goal difference in a League season: 4th, -3 – 2004–05 (League One)
- Lowest negative overall goal difference in a League season: -53 – 1924–25 (Third Division South)
- Lowest negative home goal difference in a League season: -17 – 2006–07 (League One)
- Lowest negative away goal difference in a League season: -55 – 1924–35 (Third Division South)
- Lowest final league placing with a positive goal difference in a League season: 16th, +2 – 1963–64 (Third Division), 1993–94 (Second Division)

===== Aggregate scores =====
- Highest home League aggregate score: 10
  - 7–3 versus Coventry City, Third Division South, 23 October 1926
  - 8–2 versus Crystal Palace, Third Division South, 25 December 1930
  - 7–3 versus Cardiff City, Third Division South, 1 April 1933
  - 8–2 versus Bury, Second Division, 19 February 1949
  - 6–4 versus York City, Fourth Division, 9 November 1970
- Highest away League aggregate score: 10
  - 5–5 versus Luton Town, Third Division South, 1 February 1933
  - 4–6 versus Southampton, Third Division South, 21 August 1954
  - 6–4 versus Crewe Alexandra, Fourth Division, 3 September 1977
- Highest League Cup aggregate score: 12
  - 6–6 after extra time versus Dagenham & Redbridge, first round, 12 August 2014

===== Goalless draws =====
- Most goalless draws in a season (all competitions): 9 – 1997–98
- Most goalless draws in a League season: 8
  - 1948–49 (Second Division)
  - 1973–74 (Fourth Division)
  - 1980–81 (Third Division)
  - 1997–98 (Second Division)

===== Goalscorers =====
- Most goalscorers in a League season (all competitions): 20 (League One, 2013–14)
- Most goalscorers in a League match: 6 – Darren Annon, Paul Smith, Robert Taylor, Nicky Forster, Denny Mundee and Lee Harvey (versus Plymouth Argyle, Second Division, 17 December 1994)
- Most goalscorers with 10 or more goals prior to Christmas Day (all competitions): 3
  - 1930–31, Third Division South (Cecil Blakemore, Billy Lane, Jack Lane)
  - 1964–95, Third Division (Joe Bonson, Billy Cobb, Mark Lazarus)
  - 1982–83, Third Division (Francis Joseph, Gary Roberts, Tony Mahoney)
  - 2001–02, Second Division (Lloyd Owusu, Paul Evans, Ben Burgess)
- Fewest goalscorers in a League season (all competitions): 8 – 1933–34, 1947–48 (Second Division), 1958–59 (Third Division)
- Most hat-tricks in a League season (all competitions): 8 – 1934–35 (Second Division)

===== Penalty shoot-out record =====
As of match played 9 March 2026.

Season	Date	Competition	Round	Opponent	Venue	Result	Score
1989–90	6 February 1990	Associate Members' Cup	SQF	Bristol Rovers	Home	Lost	3–4
1990–91	21 February 1991	Associate Members' Cup	SR1	Wrexham	Home	Won	3–0
1994–95	17 May 1995	Football League play-offs	SF	Huddersfield Town	Home	Lost	3–4
1997–98	25 November 1997	FA Cup	R1	Colchester United	Away	Lost	2–4
1998–99	15 December 1998	FA Cup	R2	Oldham Athletic	Home	Lost	2–4
1998–99	19 January 1999	Football League Trophy	SR3	Walsall	Home	Lost	3–4
2000–01	9 January 2001	Football League Trophy	SR2	Brighton & Hove Albion	Away	Won	4–2
2002–03	10 September 2002	Football League Cup	R1	Bournemouth	Away	Won	4–2
2003–04	14 October 2003	Football League Trophy	SR1	Barnet	Away	Won	3–1
2004–05	25 November 2004	FA Cup	R1	Bristol City	Home	Won	4–3
2005–06	18 October 2005	Football League Trophy	SR1	Oxford United	Home	Lost	3–4
2006–07	22 August 2006	Football League Cup	R1	Swindon Town	Away	Won	4–3
2006–07	17 October 2006	Football League Trophy	SR1	Northampton Town	Away	Won	4–2
2008–09	2 September 2008	Football League Trophy	SR1	Yeovil Town	Home	Won	4–2
2008–09	7 October 2008	Football League Trophy	SR2	Luton Town	Away	Lost	3–4
2010–11	21 September 2010	Football League Cup	R3	Everton	Home	Won	4–3
2010–11	5 October 2010	Football League Trophy	SR2	Leyton Orient	Away	Won	5–4
2010–11	26 October 2010	Football League Cup	R4	Birmingham City	Away	Lost	3–4
2010–11	9 November 2010	Football League Trophy	QF	Swindon Town	Away	Won	4–2
2010–11	14 December 2010	Football League Trophy	SF	Charlton Athletic	Home	Won	3–1
2011–12	30 August 2011	Football League Trophy	SR1	Milton Keynes Dons	Away	Won	4–3
2011–12	6 December 2011	Football League Trophy	SF	Barnet	Away	Lost	3–5
2012–13	6 May 2013	Football League play-offs	SF	Swindon Town	Home	Won	5–4
2014–15	12 August 2014	Football League Cup	R1	Dagenham & Redbridge	Away	Won	4–2
2019–20	13 August 2019	EFL Cup	R1	Cambridge United	Home	Lost	4–5
2020–21	6 September 2020	EFL Cup	R1	Wycombe Wanderers	Home	Won	4–2
2020–21	22 September 2020	EFL Cup	R3	West Bromwich Albion	Away	Won	5–4
2022–23	8 November 2022	EFL Cup	R3	Gillingham	Home	Lost	7–6
2023–24	29 August 2023	EFL Cup	R2	Newport County	Away	Lost	4–1
2024–25	29 October 2024	EFL Cup	R4	Sheffield Wednesday	Home	Won	5–4
2025–26	16 September 2025	EFL Cup	R3	Aston Villa	Home	Won	4–2
2025–26	9 March 2026	FA Cup	R5	West Ham United	Away	Lost	5–3

=== Clean sheets ===
- Most clean sheets kept in a Southern League season: 19 – 1913–14 (Second Division)
- Fewest clean sheets kept in a Southern League season: 2 – 1902–03 (First Division)
- Most clean sheets kept in a League season: 22 – 1971–72 (Fourth Division), 1994–95 (Second Division)
- Fewest clean sheets kept in a League season: 5 – 1936–37, 1946–47 (First Division)

=== Points ===
==== Southern League (1898–1920) ====
- Most points in a Southern League season: 44 – 1913–14 (Second Division)
- Most points per game in a Southern League season: 1.88 – 1900–01 (Second Division)
- Fewest points in a Southern League season: 5 – 1902–03 (First Division)
- Fewest points per game in a Southern League season: 0.17 – 1902–03 (First Division)
- Best start to a Southern League season: 30 points from all 16 games – 1900–01 (Second Division) (Note: Brentford were undefeated during the 1900–01 Southern League Second Division season.)
- Worst start to a Southern League season: 0 points from opening 9 games – 1902–03 (First Division)

==== Football League and Premier League (1920–present) ====
- Most points in a League season:
  - 2 points for a win: 62 – 1932–33 (Third Division South), 1962–63 (Fourth Division)
  - 3 points for a win: 94 – 2013–14 (League One)
- Most points per game in a League season: 2.12 – 1929–30 (Third Division South, adjusted to 3 points for a win)
- Fewest points in a League season:
  - 2 points for a win: 25 – 1924–25 (Third Division South), 1946–47 (First Division)
  - 3 points for a win: 37 – 2006–07 (League One)
- Fewest points per game in a League season: 0.6
  - 1924–25 (Third Division South, adjusted to 3 points for a win)
  - 1946–47 (First Division, adjusted to 3 points for a win)
- Best start to a League season: 27 points from opening 14 games – 1932–33, Third Division South
- Worst start to a League season: 1 point from opening 10 games – 1925–26, Third Division South

=== Winning percentage ===
==== Southern League (1898–1920) ====
- Highest winning percentage in a Southern League season: 87.5% – 1900–01, Second Division
- Highest winning percentage in a Southern League season (all competitions): 78.95% – 1900–01, Second Division (Note: "All competitions" comprises Southern League, Southern League test matches and FA Cup.)
- Lowest winning percentage in a Southern League season: 6.67% – 1902–03, First Division
- Lowest winning percentage in a Southern League season (all competitions): 15.39% – 1902–03, First Division

==== Football League and Premier League (1920–present) ====
- Highest winning percentage in a League season: 66.67% – 1929–30, Third Division South
- Highest winning percentage in a League season (all competitions): 65.12% – 1929–30, Third Division South (Note: "All competitions" comprises League and FA Cup.)
- Lowest winning percentage in a League season: 17.39% – 2006–07, League One
- Lowest winning percentage in a League season (all competitions): 15.686% – 2006–07, League One (Note: "All competitions" comprises League, FA Cup, EFL Cup and EFL Trophy.)

=== Attendances ===
==== Highest ====
- Highest home League attendance: 38,535 versus Arsenal (First Division, 8 September 1938)
- Highest home League second-tier attendance: 34,483 versus Cardiff City (Second Division, 18 October 1947)
- Highest home League third-tier attendance: 28,725 versus Plymouth Argyle (Third Division, 27 March 1959)
- Highest home League fourth-tier attendance: 18,521 versus Chester (Fourth Division, 31 March 1972)
- Highest home Southern League attendance: 13,770 versus Northampton Town (First Division, 27 December 1910)
- Highest home cup attendance: 38,678 versus Leicester City (FA Cup sixth round, 26 February 1949)
- Highest home EFL Cup attendance: 17,859 (versus Liverpool, second round, first leg, 5 October 1983)
- Highest home EFL Trophy attendance: 8,745 (versus Birmingham City, southern area final second leg, 9 April 1991)
- Highest home attendance prior to joining the Football League: 21,478 versus Crystal Palace (FA Cup third round replay, 27 February 1907)
- Highest home aggregate League attendance in a season: 541,128 (1946–47, First Division)
- Highest home average League attendance in a season: 25,768 (1946–47, First Division)
- Highest attendance at any Brentford match: 73,482 versus Manchester United (Premier League, 2 May 2022)

==== Lowest ====
- Lowest home League attendance: 2,002 versus Walsall (Third Division, 5 December 1927)
- Lowest home League first-tier attendance: 12,761 versus Blackpool (29 April 1939)
- Lowest home League second-tier attendance: 6,337 versus Peterborough United (27 February 1993)
- Lowest home League fourth-tier attendance: 3,155 versus Morecambe (4 December 2007)
- Lowest home FA Cup attendance: 1,000 versus Richmond Association (third qualifying round, 28 October 1899)
- Lowest home EFL Cup attendance: 2,040 versus Shrewsbury Town (first round, 12 August 1997)
- Lowest home EFL Trophy attendance: 1,100 versus Swindon Town (preliminary round, 6 January 1987)

==== Away ====
- Highest away League attendance: 73,482 versus Manchester United (Premier League, 2 May 2022)
- Highest away League second-tier attendance: 56,692 versus Newcastle United (6 September 1947)
- Highest away League third-tier attendance: 33,553 versus Queens Park Rangers (2 January 1932)
- Highest away League fourth-tier attendance: 16,544 versus Watford (25 April 1978)
- Highest away FA Cup attendance: 56,190 versus Manchester City (fourth round, 23 January 1932)
- Lowest away League attendance: 894 versus Rochdale (Fourth Division, 27 March 1976)
- Lowest away League first-tier attendance: 5,276 versus Grimsby Town (7 December 1935)
- Lowest away League second-tier attendance: 3,464 versus Burton Albion (6 March 2018)
- Lowest away League third-tier attendance: 970 versus Halifax Town (4 April 1973)
- Lowest away cup attendance: 450 versus Cesena (Anglo-Italian Cup first round, 8 December 1992)

=== Other club records ===

Brentford's starting lineup for 21 consecutive matches in all competitions during the 1929–30 season.
- Longest run of matches with unchanged starting lineup: 21 (2 November 1929 – 15 March 1930)
- Longest run undefeated in home League matches: 29 (26 December 1995 – 15 March 1997)
- Best-ever run of results: 16 wins, 3 draws (26 November 2013 – 11 January 2014)
- Quickest time to reach 50 League goals in a season: 22 matches (1963–64, Third Division)
- Fewest players used in a League season: 14 (Fourth Division, 1971–72)
- Youngest Premier League starting lineup (average age): 24 years and 98 days – versus Nottingham Forest, 17 August 2025
- Oldest starting lineup (total years): 348 years – versus Aston Villa, First Division, 1 February 1947
- Youngest-ever FA Cup starting lineup: 22 years and three months versus Gainsborough Trinity, first round, 8 November 2003
- Most Scottish players named in a starting lineup: 7 – versus Oldham Athletic, Third Division, 30 November 1963 (Chic Brodie, John Dick, Tommy Higginson, George McLeod, Willie Smith, George Summers, George Thomson)
- Most players called up for international duty during an international break: 18 (2–10 September 2019)
- Most players capped at international level during an international break: 10 (2–10 September 2019)

== Division records ==
Rankings are calculated thusly:
- Home and away records: based on the true league table
- Attacking and defensive records: based on average goals per game
- Goal difference: based on average net goals per game

=== Level 1 ===
==== Worst in division ====
- Worst home record: 1
  - 1946–47 (First Division)
- Worst home attacking record: 1
  - 1946–47 (First Division)
- Lowest home goal difference: 1
  - 1946–47 (First Division)

=== Level 2 ===
==== Best in division ====
- Best home record: 1
  - 1934–35 (Second Division)
- Best away record: 1
  - 1934–35 (Second Division)
- Best away attacking record: 2
  - 1934–35 (Second Division)
  - 2015–16 (Championship)
- Best overall defensive record: 1
  - 1934–35 (Second Division)
- Best home defensive record: 1
  - 1934–35 (Second Division)
  - 1949–50 (Second Division)
- Highest away goal difference: 1
  - 1934–35 (Second Division)

==== Worst in division ====
- Worst overall attacking record: 1
  - 1948–49 (Second Division)
- Worst home attacking record: 1
  - 1953–54 (Second Division)

=== Level 3 ===
==== Best in division ====
- Best home record: 6
  - 1929–30 (Third Division South)
  - 1964–65 (Third Division)
  - 1991–92 (Third Division)
  - 2001–02 (Second Division)
  - 2012–13 (League One)
  - 2013–14 (League One)
- Best away record: 4
  - 1932–33 (Third Division South)
  - 1994–95 (Second Division)
  - 1996–97 (Second Division)
  - 2005–06 (League One)
- Best overall attacking record: 3
  - 1982–83 (Third Division)
  - 1991–92 (Third Division)
  - 2001–02 (Second Division)
- Best home attacking record: 3
  - 1929–30 (Third Division South)
  - 1991–92 (Third Division)
  - 2001–02 (Second Division)
- Best away attacking record: 4
  - 1932–33 (Third Division South)
  - 1982–83 (Third Division)
  - 1994–95 (Second Division)
  - 2005–06 (League One)
- Best overall defensive record: 2
  - 1931–32 (Third Division South)
  - 1958–59 (Third Division)
- Best home defensive record: 2
  - 1929–30 (Third Division South)
  - 2001–02 (Second Division)
- Best away defensive record: 4
  - 1931–32 (Third Division South)
  - 1932–33 (Third Division South)
  - 1958–59 (Third Division)
  - 1996–97 (Second Division)
- Highest overall goal difference: 3
  - 1932–33 (Third Division South)
  - 1991–92 (Third Division)
  - 2001–02 (Second Division)
- Highest home goal difference: 2
  - 1929–30 (Third Division South)
  - 2001–02 (Second Division)
- Highest away goal difference: 5
  - 1932–33 (Third Division South)
  - 1991–92 (Third Division)
  - 1994–95 (Second Division)
  - 1996–97 (Second Division)
  - 2005–06 (League One)
- Highest average attendance in division: 1
  - 13,300 (1932–33, Third Division South)

==== Worst in division ====
- Worst away record: 2
  - 1924–25 (Third Division South)
  - 2006–07 (League One)
- Worst overall attacking record: 2
  - 1960–61 (Third Division)
  - 2006–07 (League One)
- Worst away attacking record: 1
  - 1960–61 (Third Division)
- Worst overall defensive record: 3
  - 1924–25 (Third Division South)
  - 1925–26 (Third Division South)
  - 2006–07 (League One)
- Worst home defensive record: 1
  - 2006–07 (League One)
- Worst away defensive record: 1
  - 1924–25 (Third Division South)
- Lowest overall goal difference: 1
  - 2006–07 (League One)
- Lowest home goal difference: 1
  - 2006–07 (League One)

=== Level 4 ===
==== Best in division ====
- Best home record: 1
  - 1998–99 (Third Division)
- Best away record: 2
  - 1971–72 (Fourth Division)
  - 2008–09 (League Two)
- Best overall attacking record: 1
  - 1998–99 (Third Division)
- Best home attacking record: 1
  - 1998–99 (Third Division)
- Best home defensive record: 1
  - 2008–09 (League Two)
- Highest overall goal difference: 2
  - 1971–72 (Fourth Division)
  - 2008–09 (League Two)
- Highest home goal difference: 1
  - 1998–99 (Third Division)
- Highest away goal difference: 3
  - 1962–93 (Fourth Division)
  - 1971–72 (Fourth Division)
  - 2008–09 (League Two)
- Highest average attendance in division: 1
  - 11,738 (1971–72, Fourth Division)

== National records ==
=== All-time ===
- Most home Football League wins in a season: 21 (1929–30, Third Division South)
- Joint-highest aggregate score in a single EFL Cup match: 12 (6–6 after extra time versus Dagenham & Redbridge, first round, 13 August 2014)
- Highest-scoring draw in a single EFL Cup match: 6–6 (versus Dagenham & Redbridge, first round, 13 August 2014)
- Quickest golden goal: 15 seconds – Robert Taylor versus Barnet (EFL Trophy second round, 7 January 1997)
- Most Football League play-off campaigns without a promotion: 9 (1991, 1995, 1997, 2002, 2005, 2006, 2012, 2015, 2020)
- Most successive Premier League matches in which scored in the opening minute: 3
  - Yoane Wissa after 22 seconds versus Manchester City, 14 September 2024
  - Bryan Mbeumo after 23 seconds versus Tottenham Hotspur, 21 September 2024
  - Bryan Mbeumo after 38 seconds versus West Ham United, 28 September 2024
- Most saves by a goalkeeper playing 45 minutes or less in a Premier League match: 6 – Mark Flekken versus Brighton & Hove Albion, 27 December 2024 (Note: Record kept since the 2003–04 Premier League season.)

=== Firsts ===
- First club to win each of the Football League Second, Third and Fourth Division championships
- First club to occupy first place in the Football League First Division and last place in the Football League Fourth Division
- First occasion on which a Football League fourth-tier match was postponed due to international call-ups: versus Plymouth Argyle, Third Division, 10 September 1998 (Danny Boxall, Tony Folan, Hermann Hreiðarsson)
- First loan player to feature as an ever-present through a season: Steve Sherwood (Fourth Division, 1974–75)
- First fourth substitute to score after entering the field in a competitive match: Justin Shaibu (versus AFC Wimbledon, Football League Cup first round, 8 August 2017)
- First club to score its first 10 Premier League goals by 10 different players in its debut Premier League season: Sergi Canós, Rico Henry, Vitaly Janelt, Christian Nørgaard, Ethan Pinnock, Ivan Toney, Yoane Wissa, Zanka, Bryan Mbeumo (2021–22)

=== One-time ===
- Joint-highest number of Football League wins in 2013 calendar year: 24
- Most wins in League football (including playoffs) in 2020 calendar year: 24
- Most home Football League wins in the 2013–14 season: 19
- Most League Cup matches played before reaching a quarter-final: 153
- Best home record in the Football League in 2014 calendar year
- Only club in top four divisions with two players scoring 20 or more Football League goals in a season – 2
  - 1977–78, Fourth Division – Steve Phillips (32), Andrew McCulloch (22)
  - 1994–95, Second Division – Nicky Forster (24), Robert Taylor (23)
- Highest away attendance in all competitions in 2018 calendar year: 8,500 (versus Arsenal, Football League Cup third round, 26 September 2018)
- Football League Championship record outgoing transfer fee:
  - Neal Maupay (transferred to Brighton & Hove Albion for a reported £20,000,000 fee, 5 August 2019)
  - Ollie Watkins (transferred to Aston Villa for a reported £28,000,000 fee, 9 September 2020)
- English record transfer fee for a teenager: Peter Broadbent (transferred to Wolverhampton Wanderers for a £10,000 fee, February 1951)
- Most Football League Championship league and playoff goals scored by substitutes during the 2020–21 season: 12
- Most EFL Championship goals scored in a season: 31 – Ivan Toney (2020–21) (Note: 2004–05 was the inaugural Football League Championship season.)

=== Other ===
- Final Football League match played on Christmas Eve: Brentford 3–4 Wimbledon (Third Division, 24 December 1983)

== Wartime football ==
=== Club honours and best performances ===
==== Leagues ====
London Combination

- Winners: 1918–19

Football League South

- Best performance: 3rd – 1944–45

London League

- Best performance: 9th – 1941–42

==== Cups ====
London War Cup

- Winners: 1941–42

London Victory Cup

- Best performance: Second round – 1918–19

Football League War Cup

- Best performance: Second round – 1940–41

Football League South War Cup

- Best performance: Group Stage – 1942–43

War Cup Winners' Match

- Drawn: 1941–42

=== Player records ===
==== Most appearances ====
Numbers in brackets indicate goals scored. Years are listed according to the player's first and last wartime appearances for the club. Appearances made and goals scored in the 1939–40 Football League and 1945–46 FA Cup are not counted.

No.	Name	Years	League	Cup	Total
1	(England) Buster Brown	1939–1946	205 (2)	31 (0)	246 (2)
2	(Wales) Idris Hopkins	1939–1946	182 (36)	41 (10)	223 (46)
3	(England) George Poyser	1939–1946	170 (0)	45 (0)	215 (0)
4	(England) Douglas Hunt (guest)	1940–1945	133 (73)	34 (13)	167 (86)
5	(England) Joe James	1939–1944	132 (3)	32 (1)	164 (4)
6	(England) Les Smith	1939–1945	133 (33)	27 (11)	160 (44)
7	(Scotland) Duncan McKenzie (guest)	1939–1945	130 (16)	26 (2)	156 (18)
8	(England) Patsy Hendren	1915–1919	122 (26)	2 (0)	124 (26)
9	(England) Henry White	1915–1919	120 (74)	2 (2)	122 (76)
10	(England) Len Townsend	1939–1946	102 (84)	18 (18)	120 (102)

==== Top goalscorers ====
Numbers in brackets indicate goals scored. Years are listed according to the player's first and last wartime appearances for the club. Appearances made and goals scored in the 1939–40 Football League and 1945–46 FA Cup are not counted.

No.	Name	Years	League	Cup	Total
1	(England) Len Townsend	1939–1946	84 (102)	18 (18)	102 (120)
2	(England) Douglas Hunt (guest)	1940–1945	73 (133)	13 (34)	86 (167)
3	(England) Henry White	1915–1919	74 (120)	2 (2)	76 (122)
4	(England) Jack Cock (guest)	1917–1919	51 (48)	1 (2)	52 (50)
5	(Wales) Eddie Perry (guest)	1941–1943	28 (39)	18 (23)	46 (62)
6	(England) Bob Thomas	1939–1946	41 (72)	5 (14)	46 (86)
7	(Wales) Idris Hopkins	1939–1946	36 (182)	10 (41)	46 (223)
8	(England) Les Smith	1939–1945	33 (133)	11 (27)	44 (160)
9	(England) Patsy Hendren	1915–1919	26 (122)	0 (2)	26 (124)
10	(England) George Wilkins	1939–1946	19 (66)	5 (23)	24 (89)

==== Other player records ====
1939–40 Football League and 1945–46 FA Cup statistics are not counted.

- Most appearances in a season (all competitions): 39
  - Patsy Hendren (1916–17)
  - Joe James (1940–41)
  - Buster Brown (1941–42)
- Most goals in a season (all competitions): 31 – Len Townsend (1944–45)
- Most goals in a match (all competitions): 6 – Len Townsend (versus Brighton & Hove Albion, Football League South, 12 September 1942)
- Most hat-tricks (all competitions): 8 – Len Townsend
- Most hat-tricks in a season (all competitions): 4 – Len Townsend (1944–45)
- Most penalties in a season: 8 – Duncan McKenzie
- Most penalties in a season (all competitions): 4 – Duncan McKenzie (1940–41)

=== Club records ===
1939–40 Football League and 1945–46 FA Cup statistics are not counted.

- Record win (all competitions): 8–0 versus Brighton & Hove Albion, Football League South War Cup, 4 March 1944
- Highest-scoring draw (all competitions): 4–4
  - 4–4 versus Watford, Football League South, 22 January 1944
  - 4–4 versus Reading, Football League South, 25 November 1944
  - 4–4 versus Chelsea, Football League South, 1 December 1945
- Record loss (all competitions): 7–0 versus Queens Park Rangers, Football League South Group B, 30 December 1939
- Most wins in a season (all competitions): 21 – 1918–19
- Most draws in a season (all competitions): 10
  - 1915–16
  - 1940–41
  - 1945–46
- Most losses in a season (all competitions): 24 – 1916–17
- Most goals scored in a season (all competitions): 102 – 1941–42
- Most goals conceded in a season (all competitions): 99 – 1916–17
- Fewest goals scored in a season (all competitions): 56 – 1916–17
- Fewest goals conceded in a season (all competitions): 49 – 1918–19
- Most clean sheets kept in a season (all competitions): 10 – 1943–44
- Fewest clean sheets kept in a season (all competitions): 3
  - 1940–41
  - 1941–42
  - 1942–43
- Highest home attendance (all competitions): 28,170 versus Chelsea (Football League South, 1 December 1945)

== Awards ==
=== Club ===
- Football League Awards
  - Community Club of the Year (2): 2005–06, 2013–14
  - League Two Community Club of the Year (1): 2008–09
  - Best Club Sponsorship (1): 2006–07
  - Family Excellence Award (8): 2007–08, 2009–10, 2010–11, 2011–12, 2012–13, 2013–14, 2014–15, 2015–16
- Stadium Business Awards
  - Sponsorship, Sales and Marketing: 2013
- Littlewoods Giant Killers Award
  - 2–1 vs Norwich City, FA Cup third round, 6 January 1996

=== Players ===
==== Player of the Year ====
- Gallaghers Divisional Footballer of the Year:
  - John O'Mara (1971–72, Fourth Division)
- PFA Fans' Player of the Year:
  - Jordan Rhodes (2008–09, League Two) (Note: On loan from Ipswich Town.)
- Football League Player of the Year:
  - Adam Forshaw (2013–14, League One)
  - Ollie Watkins (2019–20, Championship)
- London Football Awards:
  - EFL Player of the Year
    - Neal Maupay (2018–19)
    - Ollie Watkins (2019–20)
    - Ivan Toney (2020–21)
  - Goalkeeper Of the Year: Dan Bentley (2017–18)

==== Team of the Year ====
- PFA Team of the Year:
  - Level 2
    - Alex Pritchard (2014–15, Championship)
    - Alan Judge (2015–16, Championship)
    - Saïd Benrahma, Ollie Watkins (2019–20, Championship)
    - Rico Henry, Ethan Pinnock, Ivan Toney (2020–21, Championship)
  - Level 3
    - Roger Joseph (1987–88, Third Division)
    - Terry Evans, Dean Holdsworth (1991–92, Third Division)
    - Nicky Forster (1994–95, Second Division)
    - Carl Asaba (1996–97, Second Division)
    - Paul Evans (2001–02, Second Division)
    - Sam Sodje (2005–06, League One)
    - Jake Bidwell, Adam Forshaw (2013–14, League One)
  - Level 4
    - Paul Evans, Hermann Hreiðarsson (1998–99, Third Division)
    - Craig Pead (2007–08, League Two)
- Football League Team of the Year:
  - Level 2
    - Alan Judge (2015–16, Championship)
    - Ivan Toney (2020–21, Championship)
  - Level 3
    - Paul Evans, Lloyd Owusu (2001–02, Second Division)
    - Adam Forshaw, Alan McCormack (2013–14, League One) (Note: Jake Bidwell was named as a substitute.)
- Football League Team of the Year (calendar year):
  - John Egan (2016)

==== Player of the Month ====
- Premier League Player of the Month: Igor Thiago (November 2025, January 2026)
- Football League Player of the Month:
  - Level 2
    - Andre Gray (November 2014, Championship)
    - Alan Judge (October 2015, Championship)
    - Scott Hogan (September 2016, Championship)
    - Saïd Benrahma (July 2020, Championship)
    - Ivan Toney (October 2020, Championship)
  - Level 3
    - DJ Campbell (January 2006, League One)
    - Sam Saunders (December 2013, League One)
  - Level 4
    - Marcus Bean (December 2008, League Two)
    - Charlie MacDonald (February 2009, League Two)
- Football League Young Player of the Month
  - Jake Bidwell (January 2014, League One)
- PFA Fans' Player of the Month:
  - Jordan Rhodes (March 2009, League Two)
  - Saïd Benrahma (January 2020, Championship)
- Evening Standard Player of the Month:
  - Jimmy Bloomfield
  - Steve Phillips (March 1978, Fourth Division)
  - Gary Roberts
  - Terry Evans (January 1989, Third Division)
  - Gary Blissett (February 1989, Third Division)
  - Dean Holdsworth
  - Jamie Bates (December 1997, Second Division)
  - Sam Sodje (February 2005, League One)

==== Team of the Tournament ====
- EFL Cup Team of the Tournament:
  - Luke Daniels (2020–21)
  - Marcus Forss, Saman Ghoddos (2021–22)

==== Team of the Round ====
- FA Cup Team of the Round: Bryan Mbeumo (2021–22, third round)
- EFL Cup Team of the Round:
  - Luke Daniels, Josh Dasilva (2020–21, quarter-final)
  - Marcus Forss, Charlie Goode, Yoane Wissa (2021–22, third round)
  - Ivan Toney (2021–22, fourth round)
  - Hákon Valdimarsson (2024–25, second round)
  - Benjamin Arthur, Mathias Jensen, Keane Lewis-Potter (2025–26, fourth round)

==== Player of the Round ====
- FA Cup Player of the Round: Leon Legge (2009–10, second round)

==== Goal of the Tournament ====
- EFL Cup Goal of the Tournament: Yoane Wissa (2021–22)

==== Goal of the Round ====
- FA Cup Goal of the Round: Isaiah Rankin (2004–05, fifth round)
- EFL Cup Goal of the Round:
  - Emiliano Marcondes (2020–21, third round)
  - Saïd Benrahma (2020–21, fourth round)
  - Yoane Wissa (2021–22, third round)

==== Goal of the Month ====
- Premier League Goal of the Month:
  - Ivan Toney (September 2022)
  - Saman Ghoddos (October 2023)
- Championship Goal of the Month:
  - Saïd Benrahma (February 2019)
  - Ollie Watkins (February 2020)

==== Save of the Month ====
- Premier League Save of the Month: Mark Flekken (February 2024)

==== Other awards ====
- Adidas Golden Boot: Steve Phillips (1977–78, Fourth Division)
- Canon League Loyalty Award: Eddie Lyons
- Puma Golden Glove: Ben Hamer (2008–09, League Two)
- Football League Sir Tim Finney Award: Kevin O'Connor
- Football League Championship Golden Boot: Ivan Toney (2020–21)
- Football League Championship Golden Glove: David Raya (2019–20, shared)
