= John Dick =

John Dick may refer to:

- John Edgar Dick (born 1954), Canadian scientist
- John Dick (footballer, born 1876) (1876–1932), footballer for Woolwich Arsenal in the 1900s (decade)
- John Dick (footballer, born 1930) (1930–2000), footballer for West Ham United in the 1950s and 1960s
- John Dick (judge) (1788–1824), United States federal judge
- John Dick (minister) (1764–1833), Scottish minister and theologian
- John Dick (politician) (1794–1872), American politician and judge
- John Dick (rugby union) (1912–2002), New Zealand rugby union player
- John Dick (Scottish footballer) (fl. 1904–1908), Scottish footballer
- John C. Dick (1824–1910), Reform Democrat member of the Wisconsin State Assembly from Milwaukee
- John H. Dick (1918–2011), college basketball player and U.S. Navy admiral
- John Henry Dick (1919–1995), American naturalist and wildlife artist

== See also ==
- John Dicks (disambiguation)
