= 1963–64 Brentford F.C. season =

English football team season

Brentford
1963–64 season
- Chairman: Jack Dunnett
- Manager: Malky MacDonald
- Stadium: Griffin Park
- Third Division: 15th
- FA Cup: Fourth round
- League Cup: Second round
- Top goalscorer: League: Ward (19); All: Ward (22)
- Highest home attendance: 26,000
- Lowest home attendance: 6,800
- Average home league attendance: 11,883
Home colours

During the 1963–64 English football season, Brentford competed in the Football League Third Division. Despite expectations that the club could achieve a second-successive promotion, poor form in late 1963 and early 1964 led to a mid-table finish.

== Season summary ==
After a single-season stay in the Fourth Division, Brentford had returned to the Third Division as champions for the 1963–64 season. A large outlay had been made on new signings during the previous 12 months and though chairman Jack Dunnett stated that the club's big-spending days were a thing of the past, he would continue to make money available to manager Malky MacDonald during the season. There was very little transfer activity during the 1963 off-season, with half backs Willie Smith and Bill Slater coming in (Slater returned to Griffin Park after 11 years away) and £5,000 was spent on Liverpool full back Allan Jones as a replacement for the inexperienced Tom Anthony. Redevelopment work was carried out on Griffin Park throughout the summer, with floodlight pylons erected at each corner of the ground, while new club offices and a bar were built into the Braemar Road stand.

Brentford had what was perceived to be a poor start to the season and sat in mid-table after 10 matches. Expectations had been high after the Fourth Division championship triumph at the end of the previous season, but defeat to an attractive Coventry City side (managed by former Brentford player Jimmy Hill) on 5 October 1963 highlighted the gulf between the Third and Fourth Divisions. In the wake of the defeat, Brentford rapidly recovered and won six and drew two of the following 10 matches, which included a 9–0 thrashing of Wrexham at Griffin Park, a result which remains as the club's record Football League win. The team's form collapsed in late November 1963 and despite something of a recovery after a spell of over three months without a league win, the Bees were consigned to a 15th-place finish. They had some success in the FA Cup with a run to the fourth round, but after seeing off Second Division Middlesbrough in the third round, Fourth Division strugglers Oxford United took Brentford to a replay in the fourth round and then emerged 2–1 victors at Griffin Park.

100 goals were scored during the season, just two shy of the total set during the previous campaign, but the team's achilles heel was the goalkeeping position, with four players vying for the position, though November 1963 signing Chic Brodie would eventually make the position his own. The end of the 1963–64 season was notable for the retirement of full back and captain Ken Coote. He had made 559 appearances and scored 15 goals over the course of 15 seasons for Brentford and is the club's all-time record appearance maker.

A large number of record were set or equalled during the season:

- Record Football League win: 9–0 versus Wrexham, 15 October 1963
- Most goals conceded in a home Football League defeat: 6 (2–6 versus Luton Town, 8 February 1964)
- Most consecutive matches without failing to score a Football League goal: 26 (4 March – 14 September 1963)
- Most consecutive matches without failing to score a home Football League goal: 41 (21 August 1962 – 28 March 1964)
- Most Football League away draws in a season: 10
- Most home Football League goals conceded in a season: 36
- Quickest time to reach 50 Football League goals in a season: 22 matches

== League table ==
Pos	Team	Pld	W	D	L	GF	GA	GAv	Pts
14	Southend United	46	15	15	16	77	78	0.987	45
15	Queens Park Rangers	46	18	9	19	76	78	0.974	45
16	Brentford	46	15	14	17	87	80	1.088	44
17	Colchester United	46	12	19	15	70	68	1.029	43
18	Luton Town	46	16	10	20	64	80	0.800	42

== Results ==
Brentford's goal tally listed first.

=== Legend ===
Win	Draw	Loss

=== Football League Third Division ===
No.	Date	Opponent	Venue	Result	Attendance	Scorer(s)
1	24 August 1963	Notts County	H	4–1	13,200	Block, Brooks, Loxley (og), McAdams
2	27 August 1963	Bristol City	H	1–2	16,800	Dick
3	31 August 1963	Crewe Alexandra	A	1–1	6,729	McLeod
4	7 September 1963	Crystal Palace	H	2–1	15,800	Block, McAdams
5	10 September 1963	Bristol City	A	3–3	12,689	Dick (2), Kurila (og)
6	14 September 1963	Walsall	A	2–2	6,448	McAdams, Block
7	16 September 1963	Port Vale	A	0–3	11,559	
8	21 September 1963	Reading	H	4–2	12,360	Dick (3), Block
9	28 September 1963	Luton Town	A	2–0	7,479	Dick, McAdams
10	1 October 1963	Port Vale	H	1–2	11,900	McAdams
11	5 October 1963	Coventry City	H	2–3	15,830	Dick, McAdams
12	9 October 1963	Wrexham	A	4–2	7,923	Slater (2), McAdams, Dick
13	12 October 1963	Bristol Rovers	H	2–5	13,400	Fielding, Dick
14	15 October 1963	Wrexham	H	9–0	10,500	McAdams (2), Ward (2), Fox (og), Hales, Brooks (2), Summers
15	19 October 1963	Barnsley	A	1–1	6,602	Brooks
16	21 October 1963	Mansfield Town	A	2–2	12,115	Dick, Ward
17	26 October 1963	Millwall	H	3–1	15,200	McAdams, Block (2)
18	29 October 1963	Mansfield Town	H	4–0	14,900	Dick, Ward (3)
19	2 November 1963	Colchester United	A	2–1	7,117	Block, Dick
20	9 November 1963	Watford	H	1–2	17,000	Dick
21	23 November 1963	Peterborough United	H	2–0	15,900	Dick (2)
22	30 November 1963	Oldham Athletic	A	1–4	14,385	Block
23	14 December 1963	Notts County	A	0–2	3,744	
24	21 December 1963	Crewe Alexandra	H	2–2	7,520	Fielding, Dick
25	28 December 1963	Bournemouth & Boscombe Athletic	A	0–2	7,992	
26	11 January 1964	Crystal Palace	A	0–1	16,630	
27	18 January 1964	Walsall	H	1–1	10,650	Ward
28	1 February 1964	Reading	A	3–4	10,783	Block, Lazarus, Ward
29	8 February 1964	Luton Town	H	2–6	9,000	McAdams, Lazarus
30	15 February 1964	Coventry City	A	2–2	22,971	Dick, Ward
31	22 February 1964	Bristol Rovers	A	1–3	8,703	Block
32	29 February 1964	Queens Park Rangers	H	2–2	12,200	Block, Lazarus
33	7 March 1964	Millwall	A	3–1	9,140	McAdams, Ward (2)
34	14 March 1964	Colchester United	H	3–1	7,050	Ward (2), Lazarus
35	16 March 1964	Southend United	A	1–2	6,846	Ward
36	20 March 1964	Queens Park Rangers	A	2–2	9,351	Ward (2)
37	28 March 1964	Southend United	H	3–0	9,200	Higginson, Fielding, McAdams
38	30 March 1964	Shrewsbury Town	H	0–1	10,040	
39	31 March 1964	Shrewsbury Town	A	1–1	5,058	Summers
40	4 April 1964	Peterborough United	A	0–3	5,550	
41	11 April 1964	Oldham Athletic	H	2–0	8,930	Ward (2)
42	13 April 1964	Bournemouth & Boscombe Athletic	H	2–0	10,200	Jones, Ward
43	18 April 1964	Hull City	A	0–0	6,798	
44	21 April 1964	Watford	A	2–2	19,279	Fielding, McAdams
45	25 April 1964	Barnsley	H	1–1	8,350	Thomson
46	28 April 1964	Hull City	H	1–3	6,800	Hales

=== FA Cup ===
Round	Date	Opponent	Venue	Result	Attendance	Scorer(s)
1R	16 November 1963	Margate	H	2–2	12,150	Block, Dick
1R (replay)	20 November 1963	Margate	A	2–0	6,212	Ward (2)
2R	7 December 1963	Gravesend & Northfleet	H	1–0	11,850	Block
3R	4 January 1964	Middlesbrough	H	2–1	16,100	Dick, McAdams
4R	25 January 1964	Oxford United	A	2–2	15,517	Block, Ward
4R (replay)	28 January 1964	Oxford United	H	1–2	26,000	McAdams

=== Football League Cup ===
Round	Date	Opponent	Venue	Result	Attendance	Scorer(s)
1R (1st leg)	4 September 1963	Reading	A	1–1	7,582	Block
1R (replay)	23 September 1963	Reading	H	2–0	10,360	Spiers (og), McLaughlin
2R	25 September 1963	Bournemouth & Boscombe Athletic	H	0–0	10,830	
2R (replay)	4 November 1963	Bournemouth & Boscombe Athletic	A	0–2	8,057	

- Sources: 100 Years Of Brentford, Statto

== Playing squad ==
Players' ages are as of the opening day of the 1963–64 season.

Pos.	Name	Nat.	Date of birth (age)	Signed from	Signed in	Notes
Goalkeepers
GK	Chic Brodie	(Scotland)	22 February 1937 (aged 26)	Northampton Town	1963	
GK	Gerry Cakebread	(England)	1 April 1936 (aged 27)	Youth	1954	
GK	Gordon Phillips	(England)	17 November 1946 (aged 16)	Hayes	1963	
GK	Fred Ryecraft	(England)	28 August 1939 (aged 23)	Southall	1959	
Defenders
DF	Tom Anthony	(England)	16 August 1943 (aged 20)	Youth	1961	
DF	Ken Coote (c)	(England)	19 May 1928 (aged 35)	Wembley	1949	
DF	Alan Hawley	(England)	7 June 1946 (aged 17)	Youth	1962	
DF	Allan Jones	(Wales)	6 January 1940 (aged 23)	Liverpool	1963	
DF	George Thomson	(Scotland)	19 October 1936 (aged 26)	Everton	1963	
Midfielders
HB	Matt Crowe	(Scotland)	4 July 1932 (aged 31)	Norwich City	1962	
HB	Peter Gelson	(England)	18 October 1941 (aged 21)	Youth	1961	
HB	Tommy Higginson	(Scotland)	6 January 1937 (aged 26)	Kilmarnock	1959	
HB	Hugh McLaughlin	(Scotland)	2 September 1943 (aged 19)	St Roch's	1961	
HB	Mel Scott	(England)	26 September 1939 (aged 23)	Chelsea	1963	
HB	Bill Slater	(England)	29 April 1927 (aged 36)	Wolverhampton Wanderers	1963	Amateur
HB	Willie Smith	(Scotland)	6 December 1943 (aged 19)	Celtic	1963	
Forwards
FW	Micky Block	(England)	28 January 1940 (aged 23)	Chelsea	1962	
FW	John Dick	(Scotland)	19 March 1930 (aged 33)	West Ham United	1962	
FW	John Fielding	(England)	2 September 1939 (aged 23)	Southport	1963	
FW	Johnny Hales	(Scotland)	15 May 1940 (aged 23)	St Roch's	1958	
FW	Mark Lazarus	(England)	5 December 1938 (aged 24)	Queens Park Rangers	1964	
FW	Billy McAdams	(Northern Ireland)	20 January 1934 (aged 29)	Leeds United	1962	
FW	Tim Soutar	(England)	25 February 1946 (aged 17)	Youth	1961	
FW	George Summers	(Scotland)	30 July 1941 (aged 22)	Shawfield	1959	
FW	Dai Ward	(Wales)	13 July 1934 (aged 29)	Watford	1963	
Players who left the club mid-season
FW	Johnny Brooks	(England)	23 December 1931 (aged 31)	Chelsea	1961	Transferred to Crystal Palace
FW	George McLeod	(Scotland)	30 November 1932 (aged 30)	Luton Town	1958	Transferred to Queens Park Rangers

- Sources: 100 Years Of Brentford, Timeless Bees

== Coaching staff ==
Name	Role
(Scotland) Malky MacDonald	Manager
(England) Tommy Cavanagh	Trainer

== Statistics ==
=== Appearances and goals ===

Brentford's highest appearance-makers in each position during the Football League season.

Pos	Nat	Name	League		FA Cup		League Cup		Total	
Pos	Nat	Name	Apps	Goals	Apps	Goals	Apps	Goals	Apps	Goals
GK	(Scotland)	Chic Brodie	25	0	4	0	—		29	0
GK	(England)	Gerry Cakebread	6	0	0	0	0	0	6	0
GK	(England)	Gordon Phillips	0	0	1	0	0	0	1	0
GK	(England)	Fred Ryecraft	15	0	1	0	4	0	20	0
DF	(England)	Tom Anthony	0	0	1	0	0	0	1	0
DF	(England)	Ken Coote	19	0	1	0	4	0	24	0
DF	(Wales)	Allan Jones	45	1	6	0	4	0	55	1
DF	(England)	Alan Hawley	12	0	0	0	0	0	12	0
DF	(Scotland)	George Thomson	23	1	4	0	—		27	1
HB	(Scotland)	Matt Crowe	34	0	6	0	1	0	41	0
HB	(England)	Peter Gelson	2	0	0	0	0	0	2	0
HB	(Scotland)	Tommy Higginson	37	1	5	0	1	0	43	1
HB	(Scotland)	Hugh McLaughlin	2	0	0	0	2	1	4	1
HB	(England)	Mel Scott	44	0	6	0	4	0	54	0
HB	(England)	Bill Slater	5	2	0	0	0	0	5	2
HB	(Scotland)	Willie Smith	13	0	1	0	4	0	18	0
FW	(England)	Micky Block	35	11	6	3	4	1	45	15
FW	(England)	Johnny Brooks	6	4	0	0	2	0	8	4
FW	(Scotland)	John Dick	30	18	6	2	4	0	40	20
FW	(England)	John Fielding	28	4	0	0	3	0	31	4
FW	(Scotland)	Johnny Hales	9	2	3	0	0	0	12	2
FW	(England)	Mark Lazarus	20	4	—		—		20	4
FW	(Northern Ireland)	Billy McAdams	39	14	6	2	3	0	48	16
FW	(Scotland)	George McLeod	14	1	3	0	3	0	20	1
FW	(England)	Tim Soutar	1	0	0	0	0	0	1	0
FW	(Scotland)	George Summers	9	2	0	0	1	0	10	2
FW	(Wales)	Dai Ward	33	19	6	3	—		39	22

- Players listed in italics left the club mid-season.
- Source: 100 Years Of Brentford

=== Goalscorers ===
Pos.	Nat	Player	FL3	FAC	FLC	Total
FW	(Wales)	Dai Ward	19	3	—	22
FW	(Scotland)	John Dick	18	2	0	20
FW	(Northern Ireland)	Billy McAdams	14	2	0	16
FW	(England)	Micky Block	11	3	1	15
FW	(England)	Mark Lazarus	4	—	—	4
FW	(England)	Johnny Brooks	4	0	0	4
FW	(England)	John Fielding	4	0	0	4
FW	(Scotland)	Johnny Hales	2	0	0	2
HB	(England)	Bill Slater	2	0	0	2
FW	(Scotland)	George Summers	2	0	0	2
HB	(Scotland)	Tommy Higginson	1	0	0	1
DF	(Wales)	Allan Jones	1	0	0	1
FW	(Scotland)	George McLeod	1	0	0	1
DF	(Scotland)	George Thomson	1	0	0	1
HB	(Scotland)	Hugh McLaughlin	0	0	1	1
Opponents			3	0	0	3
Total			87	10	3	100

- Players listed in italics left the club mid-season.
- Source: 100 Years Of Brentford

=== Management ===
Name	Nat	From	To	Record All Comps					Record League				
Name	Nat	From	To	P	W	D	L	W %	P	W	D	L	W %
Malky MacDonald	(Scotland)	24 August 1963	28 April 1964	56	19	18	19	33.93	46	15	14	17	32.61

=== Summary ===
Games played	56 (46 Third Division, 6 FA Cup, 4 League Cup)
Games won	19 (15 Third Division, 3 FA Cup, 1 League Cup)
Games drawn	18 (14 Third Division, 2 FA Cup, 2 League Cup)
Games lost	19 (17 Third Division, 1 FA Cup, 1 League Cup)
Goals scored	100 (87 Third Division, 10 FA Cup, 3 League Cup)
Goals conceded	90 (80 Third Division, 7 FA Cup, 3 League Cup)
Clean sheets	10 (8 Third Division, 2 FA Cup, 2 League Cup)
Biggest league win	9–0 versus Wrexham, 12 September 1963
Worst league defeat	6–2 versus Luton Town, 8 February 1964
Most appearances	55, Allan Jones (45 Third Division, 6 FA Cup, 4 League Cup)
Top scorer (league)	19, Dai Ward
Top scorer (all competitions)	22, Dai Ward

== Transfers & loans ==
Players transferred in
Date	Pos.	Name	Previous club	Fee	Ref.
June 1963	HB	(Scotland) Willie Smith	(Scotland) Celtic	Free	
July 1963	HB	(England) Bill Slater	(England) Wolverhampton Wanderers	Amateur	
August 1963	DF	(Wales) Allan Jones	(England) Liverpool	£5,000	
15 October 1963	FW	(Wales) Dai Ward	(England) Watford	£8,000	
November 1963	GK	(Scotland) Chic Brodie	(England) Northampton Town	£10,000	
November 1963	DF	(Scotland) George Thomson	(England) Everton	n/a	
1963	GK	(England) Gordon Phillips	(England) Hayes	n/a	
1963	n/a	(England) John Todd	n/a	n/a	
January 1964	FW	(England) Mark Lazarus	(England) Queens Park Rangers	Part-exchange	
Players transferred out
Date	Pos.	Name	Subsequent club	Fee	Ref.
January 1964	FW	(Scotland) George McLeod	(England) Queens Park Rangers	Part-exchange	
January 1964	FW	(England) Johnny Brooks	(England) Crystal Palace	n/a	
Players released
Date	Pos.	Name	Subsequent club	Join date	Ref.
April 1964	DF	(England) Ken Coote	Retired		
April 1964	HB	(Scotland) Matt Crowe	(South Africa) Port Elizabeth City	n/a	
April 1964	FW	(Scotland) Johnny Hales	Retired		
April 1964	GK	(England) Fred Ryecraft	(England) Gravesend & Northfleet	n/a	
April 1964	HB	(England) Graham Sawyer	(England) Bexley United	1964	
April 1964	HB	(England) Bill Slater	(England) Northern Nomads	n/a	
