= Chic Brodie =

Chic Brodie may refer to:

- Chic Brodie (footballer) (1937–2000), Scottish footballer
- Chic Brodie (politician) (1944–2022), Scottish politician, member of the Scottish Parliament
