= Gordon Phillips (footballer) =

English footballer

Personal information
- Full name: Gordon David Phillips
- Date of birth: 17 January 1946
- Place of birth: Uxbridge, England
- Date of death: 3 September 2018 (aged 72)
- Place of death: Surrey, England
- Position: Goalkeeper

Youth career
- Crystal Palace

Senior career*
Years	Team	Apps	(Gls)
1961–1963	Hayes	9	(0)
1963–1973	Brentford	208	(0)
1969	→ Queens Park Rangers (loan)	0	(0)
1973–1978	Hillingdon Borough		

Managerial career
- 1990: Staines Town (joint-caretaker manager)
- * Club domestic league appearances and goals

Gordon David Phillips (17 January 1946 – 3 September 2018) was an English professional footballer who made over 200 appearances in the Football League for Brentford as a goalkeeper. He later became a coach.

== Playing career ==
=== Hayes ===
After a short spell as a youth with Crystal Palace, Phillips began his senior career at Athenian League club Hayes and made his debut at the age of 15 in a victorious Middlesex Charity Cup semi-final match in April 1962. He made two further appearances towards the end of the 1961–62 season, but was robbed of the chance to play in the 1962 Middlesex Charity Cup final because of a broken thumb. He made seven appearances during the 1962–63 season, before departing the club at the end of the campaign. While a youth, Phillips was invited to a trial for the England Youth team, but failed to win a call-up to a squad.

=== Brentford ===
Phillips joined Third Division club Brentford during the 1963 off-season. He had a difficult start to life at Griffin Park, conceding 13 goals in his first two youth and reserve matches. An injury to Gerry Cakebread and poor performances by his deputy Fred Ryecraft saw manager Frank Blunstone hand Phillips his first team debut in an FA Cup first round match versus Margate at Griffin Park on 16 November 1963. Phillips conceded two goals in the 2–2 draw and it was his only appearance of the 1963–64 season. Phillips was thereafter confined to the reserve team during the majority of his first three seasons with Brentford.

Phillips finally made his first team breakthrough in the 1966–67 season, after the club had been relegated to the Fourth Division. He was a virtual ever-present during the season and made 42 appearances. He further improved his appearance tally in the 1967–68 season, making 48 appearances. Faced with improved competition from Chic Brodie, Phillips' appearance-count dropped during the 1968–69 and 1969–70 seasons, to the point that he was placed on the transfer list at his own request in February 1968. He was an ever-present during the 1971–72 season, which saw Brentford promoted back to the Third Division with a third-place finish. 1972–73 proved to be Phillips' last with the Bees and he departed the club at the end of the season, after relegation back to the Fourth Division was confirmed. Phillips made 227 appearances during his 10 years at Griffin Park and was awarded a testimonial versus an ex-Brentford XI in October 1973, which earned him £825. He was inducted into the Brentford Hall of Fame in May 2017.

=== Non-League football ===
After his release from Brentford, Phillips dropped into non-League football and reunited with a number of former Brentford teammates at Southern League Premier Division club Hillingdon Borough during the 1973 off-season. A bottom-place finish saw Hillingdon relegated in Phillips' first season with the club, but promotion straight back to the Premier Division was achieved in the 1974–75 season. He departed the Leas Stadium in 1978 and received a testimonial. Phillips was offered to join a club in Pretoria, South Africa, but turned the offer down.

== Coaching and managerial career ==
Phillips became goalkeeping coach at Isthmian League Premier Division club Staines Town in 1989. He also had a spell as caretaker manager of the club in 1990, alongside Chris Davey and former Brentford teammate Jackie Graham. Phillips departed the club in 1990 to serve as goalkeeping coach at Brentford under manager Steve Perryman and Perryman's successor Phil Holder. He left in 1992, after the appointment of David Webb as manager.

== Personal life ==
After leaving professional football, Phillips worked for British Airways for over 30 years. He was married to Jacqui and his two sons Kelly and Trent both became footballers for Staines Town, with Trent playing as a goalkeeper. Phillips was a close friend of former Brentford teammate Alan Hawley and both served as the other's best man. He died of cancer on 3 September 2018.

== Career statistics ==
Appearances and goals by club, season and competition
Club	Season	League			FA Cup		League Cup		Other		Total	
Club	Season	Division	Apps	Goals	Apps	Goals	Apps	Goals	Apps	Goals	Apps	Goals
Hayes	1961–62	Athenian League	2	0	0	0	—		1 (Note: Appearance in Middlesex Senior Charity Cup)	0	3	0
Hayes	1962–63	Athenian League	7	0	0	0	—		0	0	7	0
Hayes	Total		9	0	0	0	—		1	0	10	0
Brentford	1963–64	Third Division	0	0	1	0	0	0	—		1	0
Brentford	1964–65	Third Division	1	0	0	0	0	0	—		1	0
Brentford	1965–66	Third Division	11	0	1	0	0	0	—		12	0
Brentford	1966–67	Fourth Division	38	0	4	0	0	0	—		42	0
Brentford	1967–68	Fourth Division	45	0	2	0	1	0	—		48	0
Brentford	1968–69	Fourth Division	23	0	0	0	2	0	—		25	0
Brentford	1970–71	Fourth Division	29	0	4	0	0	0	—		33	0
Brentford	1971–72	Fourth Division	46	0	2	0	1	0	—		49	0
Brentford	1972–73	Third Division	15	0	1	0	0	0	—		16	0
Brentford	Total		208	0	15	0	4	0	—		227	0
Queens Park Rangers (loan)	1968–69	First Division	0	0	—		—		—		0	0
Career total			217	0	15	0	4	0	1	0	237	0

== Honours ==
Brentford

- Football League Fourth Division third-place promotion: 1971–72

Individual

- Brentford Hall of Fame
