= John Dicks =

John Dicks may refer to:

- John Dicks (actor) (born 1947), English film and television actor
- John Dicks (publisher) (1818–1881), English publisher
- John Dicks (rugby union), English international rugby union player

== See also ==
- John Dix (disambiguation)
- John Dick (disambiguation)
