= John Dix =

John Dix is the name of:

- John Dix (music historian) (born 1951), New Zealand music historian, author of Stranded in Paradise: New Zealand Rock'n'Roll, 1955-1988
- John Adams Dix (1798–1879), Governor of New York from 1873 to 1874
- John Alden Dix (1860–1928), Governor of New York from 1911 to 1912
- John Ross Dix (1811–after 1863), a British writer and poet in Great Britain and America

== See also ==
- John Dix Fisher, U.S. physician
- John Dicks (disambiguation)
