= Tim Soutar =

English footballer and manager

Personal information
- Full name: Timothy John Soutar
- Date of birth: 25 February 1946 (age 80)
- Place of birth: Oxford, England
- Position: Inside left

Youth career
- 1961–1964: Brentford

Senior career*
Years	Team	Apps	(Gls)
1964–1966	Brentford	1	(0)
- Ashford Town (Kent)
- Gravesend & Northfleet
1970–1972	Salisbury		(9)
- Dunstable Town
- Staines Town
- Walton & Hersham
- Walthamstow Avenue
- Feltham
- Hanwell Town

Managerial career
- 1980: Staines Town (joint-caretaker manager)
- * Club domestic league appearances and goals

Timothy John Soutar (born 25 February 1946) is an English retired footballer who made one appearance in the Football League for Brentford as an inside left. He went on to have a long career in non-League football and played until the age of 50.

== Playing career ==
=== Brentford ===
Soutar began his career as a youth at Fourth Division club Brentford in 1961. He made his only Football League appearance for the club in a 3–1 defeat to Hull City at Griffin Park on 28 April 1964. He played in Brentford's victorious 2–1 1965 London Challenge Cup Final victory over Chelsea at Griffin Park. Soutar was released at the end of the 1965–66 season.

=== Non-League football ===
Soutar dropped into non-League football and joined Southern League First Division club Ashford Town (Kent) in 1966. He went on to play for Gravesend & Northfleet, Salisbury, Dunstable Town, Staines Town, Walton & Hersham, Feltham and Hanwell Town.

== Managerial and coaching career ==
After Rob Williams departed Isthmian League Premier Division club Staines Town in October 1980, Soutar and Arthur Rowlands were appointed joint-caretaker managers until the appointment of George Talbot. In 1989, he returned to Brentford to coach in the club's Centre Of Excellence.

== Career statistics ==
Appearances and goals by club, season and competition
Club	Season	League			FA Cup		League Cup		Total	
Club	Season	Division	Apps	Goals	Apps	Goals	Apps	Goals	Apps	Goals
Brentford	1963–64	Third Division	1	0	0	0	0	0	1	0
Career total			1	0	0	0	0	0	1	0

== Honours ==
Brentford

- London Challenge Cup: 1964–65
