= Willie Smith (footballer, born 1943) =

Scottish footballer

Personal information
- Full name: William Smith
- Date of birth: 6 December 1943 (age 82)
- Place of birth: Glasgow, Scotland
- Positions: Wing half; inside left

Youth career
- –1960: Blantyre Celtic

Senior career*
Years	Team	Apps	(Gls)
1960–1963	Celtic	0	(0)
1963–1965	Brentford	25	(0)
- Hastings United
- * Club domestic league appearances and goals

William Smith (born 6 December 1943) is a Scottish retired professional football wing half who played in the Football League for Brentford.

== Career ==
=== Early years ===
Born in Glasgow, Smith began his career as an inside left with junior club Blantyre Celtic before securing a move to Scottish League First Division club Celtic in 1960. He failed to appear for the first team and departed Celtic Park in 1963.

=== Brentford ===
Smith moved to England to sign for Third Division club Brentford on a free transfer in June 1963. Playing as a wing half, Smith made something of a breakthrough into the first team during the 1963–64 season and made 18 appearances. Over the course of the following two seasons, Smith lost his place to Mel Scott and made just 12 appearances. He was mostly confined to the reserves and won the London Challenge Cup with the team in 1965. Smith departed Griffin Park at the end of the 1965–66 and made 30 appearances for the club.

=== Hastings United ===
After his release from Brentford, Smith dropped into non-league football and signed for Southern League First Division club Hastings United during the 1966 off-season. He helped the club to a second-place finish in the 1966–67 season, which secured promotion to the Premier Division.

== Honours ==
Brentford Reserves

- London Challenge Cup: 1964–65

== Career statistics ==
Appearances and goals by club, season and competition
Club	Season	League			FA Cup		League Cup		Total	
Club	Season	Division	Apps	Goals	Apps	Goals	Apps	Goals	Apps	Goals
Brentford	1963–64	Third Division	13	0	1	0	4	0	18	0
Brentford	1964–65	Third Division	7	0	0	0	0	0	7	0
Brentford	1965–66	Third Division	5	0	0	0	0	0	5	0
Career total			25	0	1	0	4	0	30	0
