= Gerry Cakebread =

English footballer

Gerry Cakebread OBE
Personal information
- Full name: Gerald Cakebread
- Date of birth: 1 April 1936
- Place of birth: Acton, England
- Date of death: 16 September 2009 (aged 73)
- Place of death: Taunton, England
- Height: 6 ft 0 in (1.83 m)
- Position: Goalkeeper

Senior career*
Years	Team	Apps	(Gls)
1954–1965	Brentford	348	(0)
1965–1967	Hillingdon Borough		
1966–1969	Taunton Town		
- Barnstaple Town
1976	Minehead		

International career
1954	England Youth	3	(0)
- * Club domestic league appearances and goals

Gerald Cakebread OBE (1 April 1936 – 16 September 2009) was an English footballer who made over 340 appearances in the Football League for Brentford as a goalkeeper. He remained a part-time player throughout his professional career. Cakebread was posthumously inducted into the Brentford Hall of Fame in May 2015 and was described as "arguably Brentford's finest ever goalkeeper".

== Club career ==
=== Brentford ===
Cakebread began his career as a junior at the club he supported as a boy, Brentford. He was a part of the youth team which reached the semi-finals of the FA Youth Cup during the 1951–52 season. During his National Service, Cakebread was preferred to future England international goalkeeper Eddie Hopkinson by the selectors of the Royal Air Force representative team. While still an amateur, Cakebread made his first team debut in a 1–0 Third Division South defeat to Norwich City on 23 October 1954. He made two further appearances during the 1954–55 season, while working a job outside football. At the end of the campaign, Cakebread declined to sign a full professional contract and instead signed semi-professional terms. For the 1955–56 season manager Bill Dodgin named Cakebread his first choice goalkeeper ahead of Sonny Feehan.

Over five of the next six seasons, Cakebread would go on to make over 45 appearances a season and set a club record for consecutive appearances, playing 187 games in a row between November 1958 and March 1963. His run was ended by a leg injury, which saw him miss the rest of Brentford's 1962–63 Fourth Division title-winning season. Cakebread returned to action for the club's record 9–0 win over Wrexham on 15 October 1963, replacing Fred Ryecraft in the lineup. After a run of five games, he lost his place to Chic Brodie and made just one further appearance during the 1963–64 season. He played what would be his final game for the club in 2–2 draw with West London rivals Queens Park Rangers on 20 March 1964. Cakebread dropped into the reserves for the 1964–65 season and won the London Challenge Cup with the team. He departed Griffin Park in June 1965, having made 374 appearances, a total which places him eighth on the club's all-time list. Cakebread was posthumously inducted into the Brentford Hall of Fame in May 2015.

=== Non-League football ===
After his departure from Brentford, Cakebread dropped into non-League football and signed for Southern League First Division club Hillingdon Borough. He helped the club to a second-place finish and promotion to the Premier Division in the 1965–66 season. Cakebread joined Western League club Taunton Town in the late 1960s and played a part in the club's 1968–69 league title success. He followed with a short spell at Western League club Barnstaple Town, whom he joined in 1969. Cakebread joined Southern League First Division South club Minehead on a short-term emergency deal for the final game of the 1975–76 season. Needing a draw against second-place Dartford to win the league championship, Cakebread kept a clean sheet in a 2–0 win.

== International career ==
Cakebread won three caps for England at youth level and was a part of the 1954 FIFA Youth Tournament squad. He was twice named in the U23 squad, but did not play.

== Personal life ==
Cakebread worked for the Admiralty during and after his football career as a draughtsman. He was appointed an Officer of the Order of the British Empire (OBE) in the 1994 Birthday Honours for his work on Hydrographics at the Ministry of Defence. He died in September 2009, after a long illness.

== Career statistics ==
Appearances and goals by club, season and competition
Club	Season	League			FA Cup		League Cup		Total	
Club	Season	Division	Apps	Goals	Apps	Goals	Apps	Goals	Apps	Goals
Brentford	1954–55	Third Division South	3	0	0	0	—		3	0
Brentford	1955–56	Third Division South	45	0	2	0	—		47	0
Brentford	1956–57	Third Division South	38	0	3	0	—		41	0
Brentford	1957–58	Third Division South	45	0	1	0	—		46	0
Brentford	1958–59	Third Division	45	0	4	0	—		49	0
Brentford	1959–60	Third Division	46	0	2	0	—		48	0
Brentford	1960–61	Third Division	46	0	2	0	3	0	51	0
Brentford	1961–62	Third Division	46	0	5	0	1	0	52	0
Brentford	1962–63	Fourth Division	28	0	1	0	2	0	31	0
Brentford	1963–64	Third Division	6	0	0	0	0	0	6	0
Brentford	Total		348	0	20	0	6	0	374	0
Minehead	1975–76	Southern League First Division South	1	0	—		—		1	0
Career total			349	0	20	0	6	0	375	0

== Honours ==
Brentford

- Football League Fourth Division: 1962–63
- London Challenge Cup: 1964–65

Hillingdon Borough

- Southern League First Division second-place promotion: 1965–66

Taunton Town

- Western League: 1968–69

Individual

- Brentford Hall of Fame
