= Fred Ryecraft =

English footballer

Personal information
- Full name: Frederick Ryecraft
- Date of birth: 29 August 1939
- Place of birth: Southall, England
- Date of death: 26 September 2017 (aged 78)
- Place of death: Hampshire, England
- Position: Goalkeeper

Senior career*
Years	Team	Apps	(Gls)
–1959	Southall		
1959–1964	Brentford	33	(0)
- Gravesend & Northfleet
- * Club domestic league appearances and goals

Frederick Ryecraft (29 August 1939 – 26 September 2017) was an English professional footballer who played in the Football League for Brentford as a goalkeeper. He was a member of the club's 1962–63 Fourth Division championship-winning squad.

== Club career ==
=== Brentford ===
After a short spell at Athenian League club Southall, Ryecraft joined Third Division club Brentford in September 1959. First team goalkeeper Gerry Cakebread's durability meant that a spell doing national service saw Ryecraft confined to the club's reserve team, until the first team's relegation to the Fourth Division in 1962. Ryecraft finally made his first team debut in a 2–1 defeat to Gillingham on 21 August 1962. He went on to make 18 appearances during a 1962–63 season which saw the Bees return to the Third Division at the first time of asking. Ryecraft made 20 appearances during the 1963–64 season, but mainly appeared for the reserves and was released at the end of the campaign. Ryecraft made a total of 38 first team appearances for the Bees and along with Micky Ball and Johnny Hales, he is one of three players to make over 150 appearances for the Brentford reserve team.

=== Gravesend & Northfleet ===
After his release from Brentford, Ryecraft dropped back into non-League football and played for Southern League First Division club Gravesend & Northfleet.

== Representative career ==
While undertaking his national service, Ryecraft played for the British Army representative team and the Combined Services. He played on a tour of South East Asia in 1962 and was a member of the victorious Kentish Cup-winning team the same year.

== Personal life ==
While on national service in the British Army, Ryecraft was a member of the Royal Army Service Corps.

== Career statistics ==
Appearances and goals by club, season and competition
Club	Season	League			FA Cup		League Cup		Total	
Club	Season	Division	Apps	Goals	Apps	Goals	Apps	Goals	Apps	Goals
Brentford	1962–63	Fourth Division	18	0	0	0	0	0	18	0
Brentford	1963–64	Third Division	15	0	1	0	4	0	20	0
Career total			33	0	1	0	4	0	38	0

== Honours ==
British Army

- Kentish Cup: 1962

Brentford

- Football League Fourth Division: 1962–63
