= Bert Loxley =

English footballer and manager

Personal information
- Full name: Herbert Loxley
- Date of birth: 3 February 1934
- Place of birth: Matlock, England
- Date of death: 9 October 2008 (aged 74)
- Position: Wing-half

Senior career*
Years	Team	Apps	(Gls)
1952–1964	Notts County	245	(9)
1964	Mansfield Town	0	(0)
1966–1967	Lincoln City	7	(0)

Managerial career
- 1970–1971: Lincoln City
- * Club domestic league appearances and goals

Herbert Loxley (3 February 1934 – 9 October 2008) was an English footballer and manager. As a player, Loxley spent the majority of his career at Notts County, where he played more than 250 first-team games as a wing-half. Loxley made his debut for the Magpies during the 1954–55 season. In 1964, he left Notts County, and had a brief spell on the books of Mansfield Town.

Following a spell in non-league football, Loxley returned to the professional game in October 1966, when he joined Lincoln City as a member of the coaching staff. However, due to an injury crisis, Loxley had to resume his playing career, and played seven times for the Imps during the 1966–67 season.

In 1970, Loxley was appointed manager at Lincoln. He quit as manager in March 1971, and returned to his old job in the Lincoln coaching staff. He stayed with the club until 1987, and was awarded a testimonial in 1979–80 for his services to Lincoln City.

Loxley died in October 2008, following a long illness.
