= Chic Brodie (footballer) =

Scottish footballer (1937–2000)

Personal information
- Full name: Charles Thomas George Brodie
- Date of birth: 22 February 1937
- Place of birth: Duntocher, Scotland
- Date of death: 24 April 2000 (aged 63)
- Place of death: Ealing, England
- Position: Goalkeeper

Youth career
- Partick Avondale
- –1954: Duntocher Hibernian

Senior career*
Years	Team	Apps	(Gls)
1954–1957	Manchester City	0	(0)
1957–1958	Gillingham	18	(0)
1958–1961	Aldershot	95	(0)
1961	Wolverhampton Wanderers	1	(0)
1961–1963	Northampton Town	87	(0)
1963–1971	Brentford	199	(0)
1971–1973	Margate		
1973–1974	Wealdstone		
1974–1975	Maidstone United		

International career
- Scotland Schoolboys
1953–1954	Scotland Juniors	3	(0)
- * Club domestic league appearances and goals

Charles Thomas George Brodie (22 February 1937 – 24 April 2000) was a Scottish professional footballer who played as a goalkeeper.

Brodie made 400 appearances in The Football League, most notably for Brentford, Aldershot and Northampton Town. His professional career came to an end in 1970, when he was seriously injured after a dog ran onto the field of play.

== Career ==
=== Manchester City ===
Born in Duntocher, Brodie began his career with Junior clubs Duntocher Hibernian and Partick Avondale. He joined Manchester City of the Football League First Division as an amateur in March 1954. He spent four years with the club, playing understudy to the popular German goalkeeper Bert Trautmann, but failed to break into the first team and departed in July 1957.

=== Gillingham ===
Brodie dropped down the leagues to join Gillingham of the Third Division South in July 1957. He spent one season with the Kent-based club, during which he played 22 times.

=== Aldershot ===
Brodie joined Fourth Division club Aldershot in July 1958. At the time he was completing his National Service and was stationed in the town. He remained at the Recreation Ground until February 1961 and departed having made 106 appearances for the club.

=== Wolverhampton Wanderers ===
Brodie secured a move back to the top-flight when he joined Wolverhampton Wanderers for a then-club record £9,000 in February 1961. He played just one league match for the club, before departing Molineux in September 1961.

=== Northampton Town ===
Brodie dropped back down to the Third Division to join Northampton Town in September 1961, for a £4,000 fee. His first appearance for the club meant that he made three consecutive appearances for three clubs. Brodie played regularly for the club for just over two years and won a Third Division championship medal during the 1962–63 season. He departed the County Ground in November 1963, after making 97 appearances for the Cobblers.

=== Brentford ===
Brodie moved to London to join Third Division club Brentford in November 1963 in a £10,000 deal. He quickly usurped long-standing regular goalkeeper Gerry Cakebread and was the Bees' regular goalkeeper until losing his place to Gordon Phillips during an injury-affected 1966–67 season. He regained his place in the team during the 1969–70 season, in which he featured as an ever-present in all competitions.

On 27 November 1970, a dog ran onto the field of play during a Fourth Division match away to Colchester United. The dog impacted Brodie's leg after he had picked up the ball and damaged ligaments in his knee. The incident was one of a number which occurred during Brodie's career with the club, which included being struck on the knee by a stone thrown from the crowd and finding a hand grenade in his goalmouth (discovered to be a replica). Though he managed five further appearances during the second half of the 1970–71 season, the injury ended Brodie's professional career. Later, Brodie summed up the incident by saying that "the dog may have been small, but it just happened to be solid". Brodie departed Griffin Park at the end of the 1970–71 season, after making 224 appearances during his eight years with the Bees. He was posthumously inducted into the Brentford Hall of Fame in 2015.

=== Non-League football ===
In 1971 Brodie resumed playing, albeit at a semi-professional level, with Southern League Premier Division club Margate. He remained with the Gate for two seasons and was in goal when the team lost 11–0 to Bournemouth in an FA Cup match in November 1971. He later played for Wealdstone and Maidstone United before retiring from football.

== International career ==
Brodie represented Scotland at Schoolboy and Junior level.

== Personal life ==
Prior to becoming a professional footballer, Brodie served a five-year apprenticeship in electrical engineering. In his latter years as a professional footballer, Brodie became a London taxi driver and as of September 1995 was living in Southall. He died of cancer in April 2000 at the age of 63.

== Career statistics ==
Appearances and goals by club, season and competition
Club	Season	League			FA Cup		League Cup		Total	
Club	Season	Division	Apps	Goals	Apps	Goals	Apps	Goals	Apps	Goals
Gillingham	1957–58	Third Division South	18	0	4	0	—		22	0
Wolverhampton Wanderers	1960–61	First Division	1	0	—		—		1	0
Northampton Town	1961–62	Third Division	32	0	3	0	—		35	0
Northampton Town	1962–63	Third Division	46	0	1	0	3	0	50	0
Northampton Town	1963–64	Second Division	9	0	—		3	0	12	0
Northampton Town	Total		87	0	4	0	6	0	97	0
Brentford	1963–64	Third Division	25	0	4	0	—		29	0
Brentford	1964–65	Third Division	45	0	4	0	1	0	50	0
Brentford	1965–66	Third Division	35	0	1	0	2	0	38	0
Brentford	1966–67	Fourth Division	8	0	0	0	3	0	11	0
Brentford	1967–68	Fourth Division	1	0	0	0	0	0	1	0
Brentford	1968–69	Fourth Division	22	0	2	0	1	0	25	0
Brentford	1969–70	Fourth Division	46	0	2	0	3	0	51	0
Brentford	1970–71	Fourth Division	17	0	1	0	1	0	19	0
Brentford	Total		199	0	14	0	11	0	224	0
Career total			315	0	22	0	17	0	344	0

== Honours ==
Northampton Town

- Football League Fourth Division: 1962–63

Brentford

- London Challenge Cup: 1966–67

Individual

- Brentford Supporters' Player of the Year: 1964–65, 1965–66
- Brentford Players' Player of the Year: 1969–70
- Brentford Hall of Fame
