= John Dick (Scottish footballer) =

Scottish footballer

Personal information
- Full name: John Dick
- Place of birth: Scotland
- Position: Wing half

Senior career*
Years	Team	Apps	(Gls)
1904–1907	Queen's Park	35	(1)
1907	St Mirren		
1907–1908	Queen's Park	0	(0)
1908	Motherwell	3	(0)
- * Club domestic league appearances and goals

John Dick was a Scottish amateur footballer who played as a wing half in the Scottish League for Queen's Park and Motherwell.

== Personal life ==
Dick served as a sapper in the Royal Engineers during the First World War.
