= List of Brentford F.C. managers =

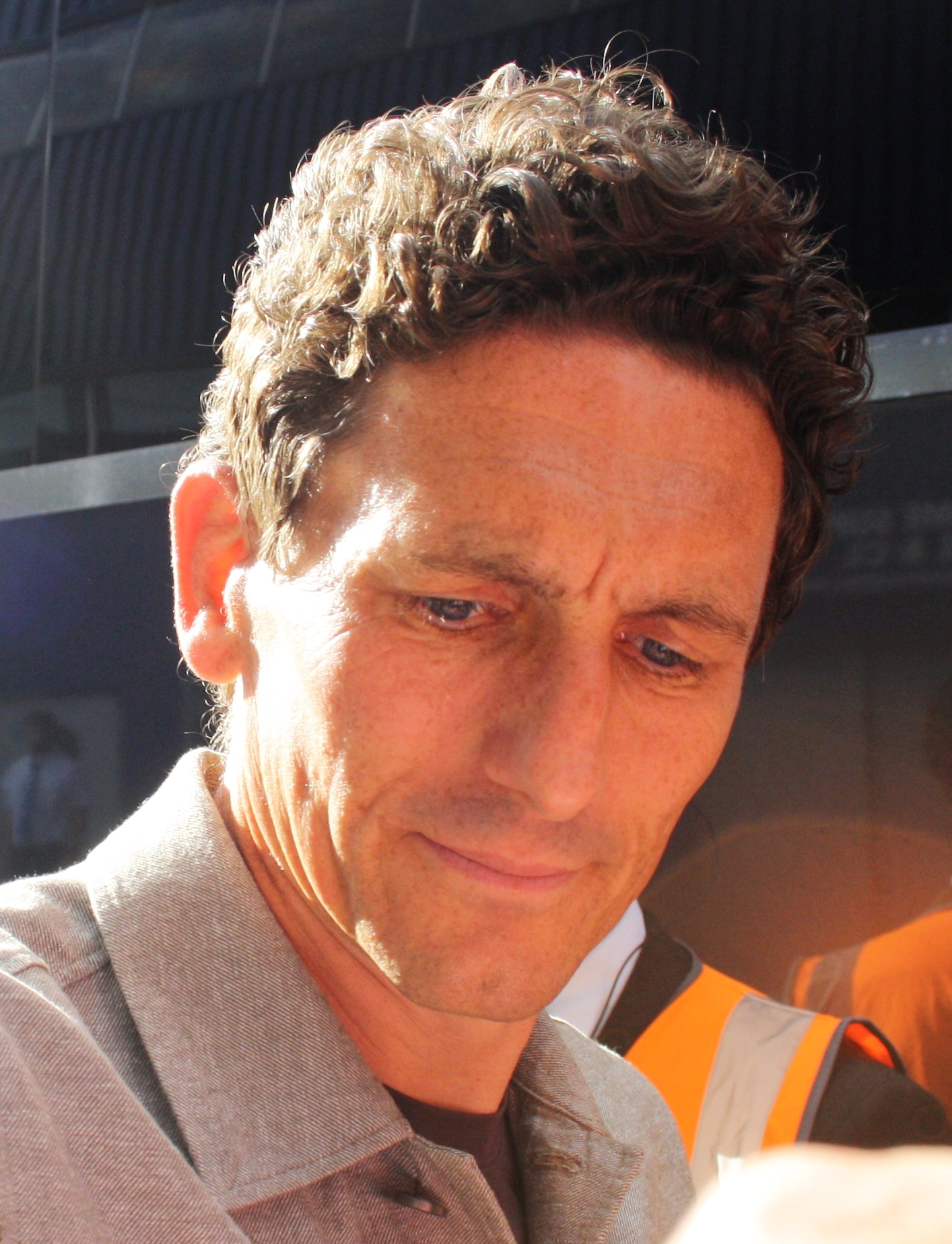
Keith Andrews was appointed Brentford head coach in June 2025.

Brentford Football Club is an English professional football club based in Brentford, Hounslow, London. Between 1897 and 1920, the first team competed in the London League, Southern League and Western League. Since 1920, the first team has competed in the Football League, the Premier League and other nationally and internationally organised competitions. All managers who have managed at least one first team match are listed below.

From Brentford's formation in 1889 and until 1900, the club's first team was run by a committee. William Lewis was appointed as the club's first official secretary-manager in May 1900. Fred Halliday was at the helm for Brentford's first ever Football League fixture in August 1920. The club has had 45 full-time managers, with the most recent appointment being Keith Andrews on 27 June 2025.

Brentford's most successful manager in terms of silverware is Harry Curtis, who after being appointed in May 1926, won the Third Division South and Second Division titles in the 1932–33 and 1934–35 seasons respectively and won promotion to First Division for the first time in the club's history. Curtis recorded Brentford's highest-ever league finish (fifth in 1935–36) and the club topped the First Division table for three consecutive months during the 1937–38 season. Brentford also won the 1935 London Senior Cup, the 1942 London War Cup and reached the FA Cup sixth round three times during Curtis' tenure.

Brentford has never won a senior competitive cup (the club has reached the 1985, 2001 and 2011 Football League Trophy Finals), but several other managers have won silverware in the form of league championships: Malky MacDonald (Fourth Division, 1962–63), Phil Holder (Third Division, 1991–92), Ron Noades (Third Division, 1998–99) and Andy Scott (League Two, 2008–09).

The majority of Brentford's managers have been English, with Scotland being the next-best represented (Jimmy Bain, Malky MacDonald, John Docherty and Frank McLintock). Uwe Rösler (Germany) was Brentford's first overseas manager.

An overhaul of the club's management structure prior to the beginning of the 2015–16 season saw the manager's position redefined and renamed as that of a "head coach". Marinus Dijkhuizen was the first appointment to the new role on 1 June 2015. Dane Thomas Frank was appointed head coach in October 2018 and took the club to successive Championship playoff Finals in 2020 and 2021. Frank's victory in the latter Final made him the second man to manage Brentford to promotion from the second-tier, the first Brentford manager to win promotion via the playoffs and the first Brentford manager to manage in the Premier League.

== Managerial history ==
=== 1889–1926: Early Southern League years and election to the Football League ===
In the early years of Brentford, first team affairs were run by a committee involving any or all of the club's directors, secretary, trainer or captain, who presided over the selection of the team and the arrangement of friendly fixtures. For 11 years after the club's formation in 1889, leading figures in the running of the first team included secretaries Archer Green, C. West, A. E. Harriss, William Brown, J. Hinton-Bailey and captain J. J. K. Curtis.

Fresh off the back of wins in the London Senior Cup and Middlesex Senior Cup in the 1897–98 season, Brentford were elected into the Southern League and commenced play in Second Division London in the 1898–99 season. William Lewis took over as the club's first official manager in August 1900, leading the club to the Second Division title in his first season. Former Everton secretary-manager Dick Molyneux replaced him in May 1903 and together with his successors William Brown and Fred Halliday, kept Brentford in the First Division. Halliday brought silverware to Griffin Park in the shape of the Southern Professional Charity Cup in the 1908–09 season. With league form faltering, Halliday resigned from his position in November 1912 and was replaced by Dusty Rhodes, who could not prevent the Bees from slipping back into the Second Division at the end of the 1912–13 season.

Competitive football was halted for the duration of the First World War in 1915 and play resumed in 1919, with Brentford being elevated to the Southern League First Division and Fred Halliday, in his second spell as manager, recording a mid-table finish. Brentford were elected into the Football League as founder members of the Third Division South in 1920 and Halliday guided the club to a 15th-place finish before leaving the manager's position for a second time. Archie Mitchell took over as manager, presiding over some forgettable seasons before Halliday was reinstated for the third time in December 1924, successfully gaining re-election at the end of a torrid 1924–25 season. Halliday managed a mid-table finish in 1925–26, before leaving his position for the final time at the end of the season. He was the club's final secretary-manager.

=== 1926–1949: March up the leagues and First Division heyday ===
Former Gillingham manager Harry Curtis was appointed Brentford manager in May 1926 and the most successful period of the club's history began. Curtis' team won all 21 home games in the 1929–30 Third Division South, a national record which still stands. The team consistently challenged for promotion and buoyed by the inspired triple-signing from Middlesbrough of Jack Holliday, Billy Scott and Herbert Watson, Curtis' team won the Third Division South championship in the 1932–33 season and the Second Division/London Challenge Cup double two years later. In Brentford's debut season in the First Division, Curtis led the club to its highest-ever league placing of 5th and secured 6th-place finishes in the following two seasons. Curtis' wheeler-dealer skills in the transfer market kept Brentford competitive in the league, making a profit on the sale of players and developing his signings into internationals, including Billy Scott and Les Smith (England), David McCulloch, Bobby Reid and Duncan McKenzie (Scotland) and Idris Hopkins (Wales).

Brentford reached the sixth round of the FA Cup for the first time in March 1938 and led the First Division for three months earlier in the 1937–38 season, but the run of success was brought to an end by the outbreak of the Second World War in 1939. Curtis added further silverware to the Griffin Park trophy room during the war years, winning the 1942 London War Cup in what is to date, Brentford's only Wembley triumph. A dearth of players up to the standard of the mid-1930s squad put Brentford into decline in the early post-war years, with the club's relegation to the Second Division in 1947 preceding Curtis' resignation in February 1949. The bright spot of the period were runs to the sixth round of the FA Cup in 1946 and 1949.

=== 1949–1978: Decline and financial woes ===
Jackie Gibbons took over as the club's manager in February 1949, successfully avoiding relegation to the Third Division South, before a failure to progress beyond a couple of mid-table Second Division finishes led him to resign in August 1952. Harry Curtis' longtime assistant Jimmy Bain steadied the ship until Tommy Lawton took over as player/manager in January 1953. An awful start to the 1953–54 season led Lawton to resign and the appointment of Bill Dodgin, Sr. failed to improve matters, with Brentford suffering relegation to the Third Division South in May 1954. It was only after the appointment of Malky MacDonald in May 1957 (who had returned to the club after serving as a player and coach under Harry Curtis in the late 1940s) that fortunes changed. Like his predecessors since the Second World War, MacDonald relied on products of the club's youth system. The goals of homegrown forwards Jim Towers and George Francis fired the Bees to 2nd and 3rd-place finishes in the 1957–58 and 1958–59 seasons respectively, before their sales in 1961 cut off the team's goal supply. The Brentford board also reduced the number of playing staff to 16, with six players being retained on a part-time basis, which led to the club suffering relegation to the Fourth Division in 1962. MacDonald's big money signings of John Dick, Johnny Brooks and Billy McAdams completed an all-international forward line and the team won the 1962–63 Fourth Division championship at a canter.

MacDonald's former trainer Tommy Cavanagh built on his good work, missing out on promotion to the Second Division by two points and winning the London Challenge Cup in the 1964–65 season, but with Brentford staring at relegation in April 1966, Cavanagh was sacked. His replacement Billy Gray could not keep the club in the Third Division and after a takeover bid by Queens Park Rangers in January 1967, Jimmy Sirrel was appointed manager. The one positive moment of Sirrel's cash-strapped reign was winning the 1966–67 London Challenge Cup and it was Frank Blunstone who brought the good times back to Griffin Park, finishing 3rd in the 1971–72 season to secure promotion to the Third Division with a squad of just 14 players. After failing to preserve the club's third-tier status and falling-out with the board, Blunstone resigned in July 1973. Mike Everitt and John Docherty failed to compete in the Fourth Division, before promotion back to the third-tier was accomplished under Bill Dodgin, Jr. in the 1977–78 season.

=== 1978–2000: Rooted in the third-tier ===
In 1978, Brentford began a period of 14 consecutive seasons in the Third Division, finishing mostly in mid-table and narrowly avoiding relegation under Frank McLintock in 1983–84. McLintock took Brentford to the 1985 Football League Trophy Final, which was lost 3–1 to Wigan Athletic. Following the appointment of McLintock's assistant Steve Perryman in February 1987, the foundations were set for a promotion bid after Perryman's signings of strikers Dean Holdsworth and Gary Blissett. Brentford reached the sixth round of the FA Cup and the semi-finals of the Football League Trophy in 1988–89 and despite Perryman's shock resignation on the eve of the 1990–91 season, his assistant Phil Holder took over and led the Bees into their first playoff campaign in May 1991 and to promotion to the second-tier as champions 12 months later. Holder's Bees were relegated from the newly renamed First Division at the first time of asking, but challenged for promotion from the Second Division under David Webb in 1994–95 and 1996–97, failing in the playoffs on both occasions.

By the time Webb took over the ownership of the club and replaced himself with Eddie May in August 1997, the sales of key players Nicky Forster, Marcus Bent, Paul Smith, Barry Ashby, Martin Grainger and Carl Asaba left too great a void to fill and May lasted just three months in the job. Brentford were relegated at the end of the 1997–98 season under Micky Adams. Ron Noades took over the club as chairman in June 1998 and appointed himself manager, with support from coaches Ray Lewington, Terry Bullivant and Brian Sparrow. A cash injection saw the Bees win the Third Division title at the first attempt and return straight back to the Second Division, claiming the championship with a final-day win over eventual runners-up Cambridge United at the Abbey Stadium.

=== 2000–2014: Near-misses and turnaround ===
Noades' signings of forward Lloyd Owusu, midfielders Paul Evans and Gavin Mahon and central defenders Darren Powell and Ívar Ingimarsson in 1998 and 1999 formed the bedrock of the team which reached the 2001 Football League Trophy Final under Ray Lewington and the 2002 Second Division Playoff Final under Steve Coppell. The nucleus of the squad up was broken up during the 2002 off-season and the administration-threatened club went into decline under Coppell's replacement Wally Downes. Martin Allen replaced Downes in March 2004 and pulled off "The Great Escape" to preserve Brentford's Second Division status on the final day of the 2003–04 season. Allen assembled a competitive "two bob" team which finished in the playoff positions in the newly named League One in the 2004–05 and 2005–06 seasons and enjoyed two runs to the fifth round of the FA Cup. After the playoff failure in May 2006, the squad broke up and Allen resigned after failing to secure funding from the board for replacement players. Brentford finished bottom of League One in the 2006–07 season, with Leroy Rosenior at the helm until being replaced by youth team manager Scott Fitzgerald in November 2006.

Terry Butcher was named as manager in April 2007 and a potential double relegation into non-League football was averted by his assistant Andy Scott, who replaced Butcher in December 2007 and steered the club to the League Two championship in the 2008–09 season. Despite runs to the League Cup fourth round and the 2011 Football League Trophy Final, Scott was sacked halfway through the 2010–11 season, with Nicky Forster taking over until the end of the campaign. An overhaul of Brentford's management structure by owner Matthew Benham in the 2011 off-season saw Uwe Rösler appointed as Brentford's first overseas manager. Rösler took Brentford to the fourth round of the FA Cup and the 2013 League One Playoff Final in the 2012–13 season, before leaving in December 2013 and being replaced by former sporting director Mark Warburton, who built on Rösler's good work to secure automatic promotion to the Championship at the end of the 2013–14 season. Warburton's sole season in charge in the Championship ended in a playoff semi-final defeat to Middlesbrough.

=== 2014–2021: Promotion to the second-tier ===
After a second overhaul of the management structure in four years, Mark Warburton was succeeded by head coach Marinus Dijkhuizen on 1 June 2015. A tumultuous start to the 2015–16 season saw Dijkhuizen replaced after 9 matches by Development Squad manager Lee Carsley, who stabilised the club's league position before Dean Smith was appointed head coach on 30 November 2015. Smith guided Brentford to consecutive top-10 finishes in the 2015–16, 2016–17 and 2017–18 seasons before his departure in October 2018. After serving for two years as assistant head coach to Dean Smith, Thomas Frank was promoted into the role of head coach in October 2018 and guided Brentford to the 2020 Championship play-off final, which was lost to West London rivals Fulham. At the time of Frank's 100th match in charge in October 2020, he had the highest winning percentage of any Brentford manager to manage 100 or more matches. Frank's team went one better during the 2020–21 season and won promotion to the Premier League after a 2–0 victory over Swansea City in the 2021 Championship play-off final.

=== 2021–present: Premier League ===
Head coach Thomas Frank presided over mid-table finishes during each of Brentford's first four Premier League seasons, with the club remaining in contention for a European place on the final day of the 2022–23 and 2024–25 seasons. In October 2022, Frank achieved the feat of having won more of his first 200 matches than any Brentford head coach or manager to also reach 200. He departed the role in June 2025 and was replaced by Keith Andrews.

== Managers and head coaches ==
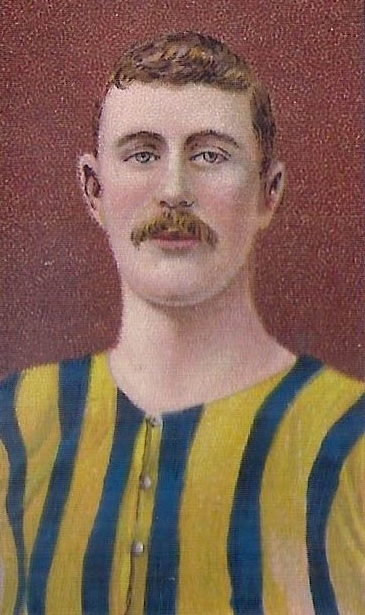
During the 1907–08 season, George Parsonage served as Brentford's first player-manager.

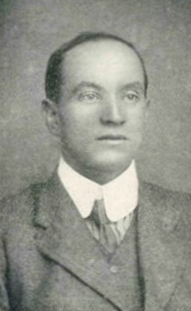
Fred Halliday managed Brentford in three spells between 1908 and 1926 and was the club's manager at the time of its election into the Football League in 1920.

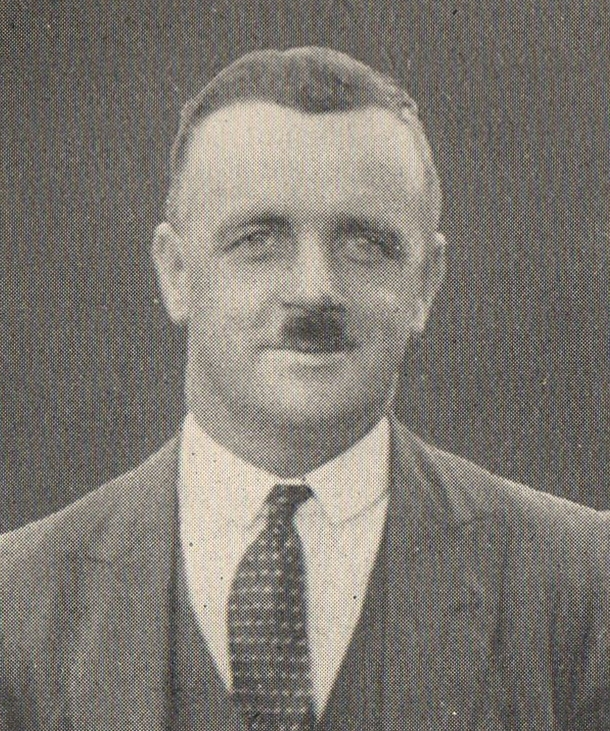
Brentford's most successful manager, Harry Curtis masterminded promotions from the Third Division South to the First Division between 1933 and 1935.

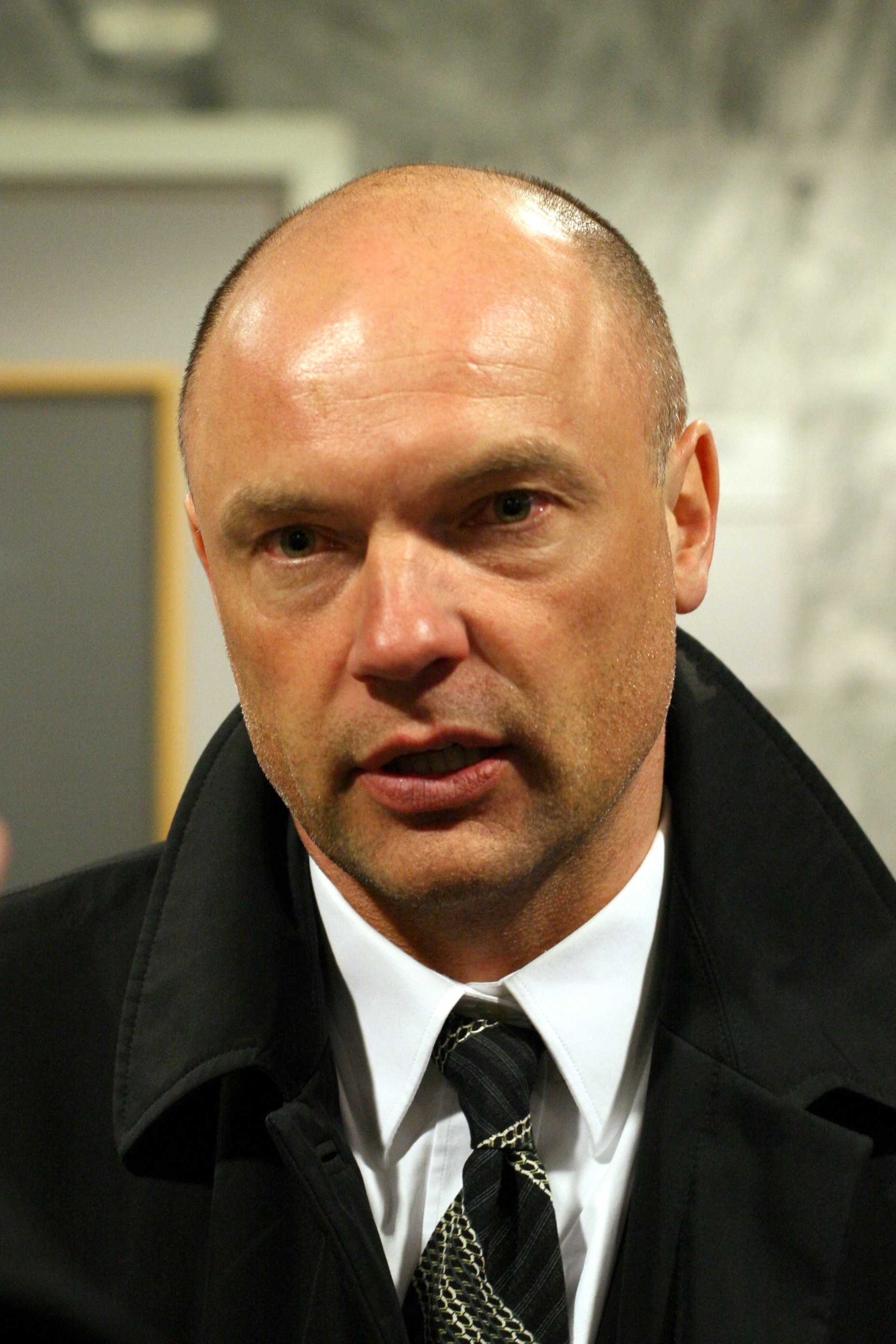
Appointed in 2011, Uwe Rösler was Brentford's first manager born outside the British Isles.

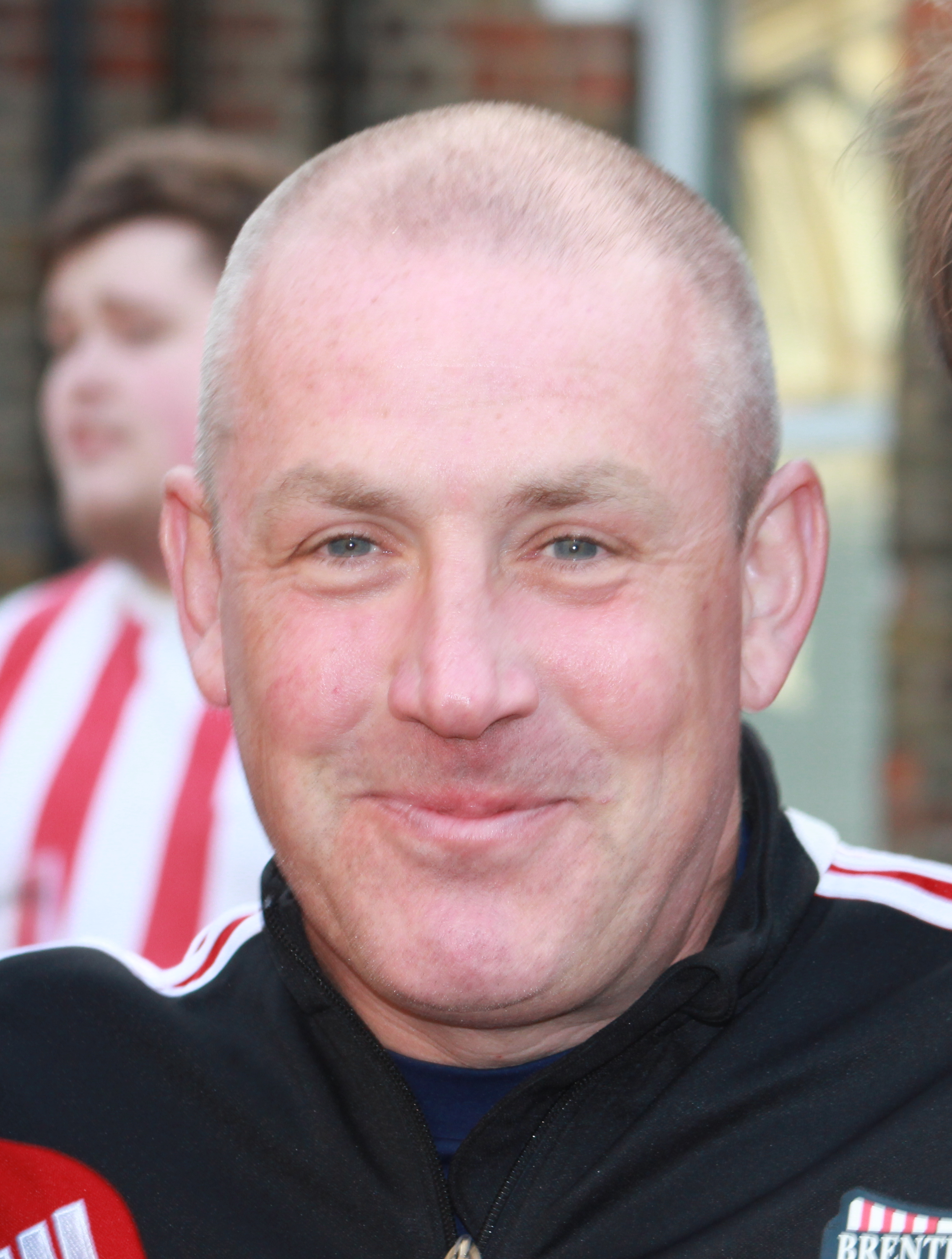
Mark Warburton has the highest winning percentage of any manager who has managed 75 or more Brentford matches.

Symbol	Meaning
‡	Brentford manager in the 2025–26 season.
*	Manager has left Brentford but is still managing in a professional league or at international level.
♦	Manager also played for the club.

As of match played 24 May 2026. Only competitive matches are counted.

No.	Manager	Nationality	From	To	Pld	W	D	L	Winning percentage	Notes	Ref.
1	William Lewis	England	August 1900	May 1903	92	29	16	47	31.52		
2	Dick Molyneux	England	August 1903	January 1906	102	33	25	44	32.35		
—	William Lewis (caretaker)	England	March 1904	April 1904	5	0	1	4	0	(Note: In March 1904, Dick Molyneux was suspended until the end of the 1903–04 season for illegally trying to buy goalkeeper John Bishop out of the Army. His role was covered by William Lewis.)	
—	Bob Crone (caretaker) ♦	Ireland	January 1906	February 1906	6	3	1	2	50		
3	William Brown	England	February 1906	January 1908	79	31	13	35	39.24		
—	George Parsonage (caretaker) ♦	England	January 1908	May 1908	17	8	3	6	47.06	(Note: Served as player-manager.)	
4	Fred Halliday	England	24 June 1908	13 November 1912	181	62	36	83	34.25		
5	Dusty Rhodes ♦	England	14 November 1912	April 1915	87	38	19	30	43.68	(Note: Member of the Brentford Hall of Fame.)	
6	Fred Halliday	England	August 1915	August 1921	86	24	22	40	27.91		
7	Archie Mitchell ♦	England	August 1921	2 December 1924	155	51	35	69	32.9		
8	Fred Halliday	England	3 December 1924	May 1926	67	22	12	33	32.84		
9	Harry Curtis	England	May 1926	February 1949	708	306	157	245	43.28		
10	Jackie Gibbons ♦	England	February 1949	August 1952	148	52	40	56	35.14		
11	Jimmy Bain ♦	Scotland	August 1952	January 1953	23	7	5	11	30.43		
12	Tommy Lawton ♦	England	January 1953	September 1953	31	8	9	14	25.81		
—	Fred Monk (caretaker) ♦	England	September 1953	October 1953	2	0	1	1	0		
13	Bill Dodgin Sr.	England	October 1953	May 1957	183	65	57	61	35.52		
14	Malky MacDonald ♦	Scotland	May 1957	January 1965	386	163	95	128	42.23		
15	Tommy Cavanagh	England	January 1965	18 April 1966	60	18	15	27	30		
—	Ian Black (caretaker)	Scotland	18 April 1966	2 May 1966	3	1	1	1	33.33		
16	Billy Gray	England	2 May 1966	March 1967	42	15	12	15	35.71		
17	Jimmy Sirrel	England	March 1967	10 November 1969	137	55	32	50	40.15	(Note: Initially as caretaker manager.)	
—	Ron Fenton (caretaker) ♦	England	10 November 1969	December 1969	6	2	2	2	33.33		
18	Frank Blunstone	England	December 1969	11 July 1973	172	70	36	66	40.7		
19	Mike Everitt	England	16 August 1973	15 January 1975	78	23	22	33	29.49		
—	Jess Willard (caretaker)	England	15 January 1975	20 January 1975	1	0	1	0	0		
20	John Docherty ♦	Scotland	20 January 1975	7 September 1976	78	26	23	29	33.33		
—	Eddie Lyons (caretaker)	England	7 September 1976	16 September 1976	1	0	1	0	0		
21	Bill Dodgin Jr.	England	16 September 1976	March 1980	184	73	37	74	39.67		
22	Fred Callaghan	England	March 1980	2 February 1984	203	69	57	77	33.99		
—	Frank Blunstone (caretaker)	England	2 February 1984	9 February 1984	1	0	0	1	0		
23	Frank McLintock	Scotland	9 February 1984	24 January 1987	168	60	47	61	35.71		
24	Steve Perryman ♦	England	25 January 1987	15 August 1990	193	79	48	66	40.93		
25	Phil Holder	England	24 August 1990	11 May 1993	178	78	35	65	43.82		
26	David Webb	England	17 May 1993	4 August 1997	227	91	66	70	40.09		
—	Kevin Lock (caretaker)	England	5 August 1997	12 August 1997	1	0	0	1	0		
27	Eddie May	England	12 August 1997	5 November 1997	19	5	5	9	26.32		
28	Micky Adams ♦	England	5 November 1997	1 July 1998	33	7	15	11	21.21		
29	Ron Noades	England	1 July 1998	20 November 2000	130	51	33	46	39.23	(Note: Also served as chairman between June 1998 and March 2003.)	
30	Ray Lewington	England	20 November 2000	7 May 2001	37	14	11	12	37.84		
31	Steve Coppell	England	8 May 2001	5 June 2002	54	27	12	15	50		
32	Wally Downes	England	28 June 2002	14 March 2004	96	29	21	46	30.21		
—	Garry Thompson (caretaker)	England	14 March 2004	18 March 2004	1	0	1	0	0		
33	Martin Allen	England	18 March 2004	31 May 2006	124	54	36	34	43.55		
34	Leroy Rosenior	Sierra Leone	14 June 2006	18 November 2006	23	3	10	10	13.04		
35	Scott Fitzgerald ♦	Republic of Ireland	18 November 2006	10 April 2007	25	4	5	16	16		
—	Barry Quin (caretaker)	England	10 April 2007	7 May 2007	4	1	0	3	25		
36	Terry Butcher	England	7 May 2007	11 December 2007	23	5	5	13	21.74		
37	Andy Scott ♦	England	11 December 2007	3 February 2011	168	68	50	50	40.48		
38	Nicky Forster ♦	England	3 February 2011	7 May 2011	21	9	5	7	42.86		
39	Uwe Rösler	Germany	10 June 2011	7 December 2013	136	60	40	36	44.12		
—	Alan Kernaghan (caretaker)	Republic of Ireland	7 December 2013	9 December 2013	1	0	0	1	0		
40	Mark Warburton	England	10 December 2013	31 May 2015	78	42	14	22	53.85		
41	Marinus Dijkhuizen *	Netherlands	1 June 2015	27 September 2015	9	2	2	5	22.22		
42	Lee Carsley *	Republic of Ireland	28 September 2015	30 November 2015	10	5	2	3	50		
43	Dean Smith *	England	30 November 2015	10 October 2018	144	57	36	51	39.58		
44	Thomas Frank *	Denmark	16 October 2018	12 June 2025	317	132	77	108	41.64	(Note: Owing to Frank testing positive for COVID-19, Brentford B head coach Neil MacFarlane presided over a 2–1 FA Cup victory over Middlesbrough on 9 January 2021.)	
45	Keith Andrews ‡	Republic of Ireland	27 June 2025	Present	45	18	13	14	40		

== Assistant managers and assistant head coaches ==
Symbol	Meaning
‡	Also managed the club on a permanent basis.

As of 16 June 2025.

Manager	Nationality	From	To	Notes	Ref.
Alex Graham	Scotland	1925	May 1926		
Dick Hendrie	Scotland	1927	1929		
Jimmy Bain ‡	Scotland	1934	1956		
Tommy Cavanagh ‡	England	1962	January 1965		
Jimmy Sirrel ‡	Scotland	February 1965	March 1967		
Ron Fenton	England	1968	1970		
Fred Callaghan ‡	England	February 1977	May 1977		
Tommy Baldwin	England	1978	March 1980		
Ron Harris	England	1980	1983		
John Docherty ‡	Scotland	February 1984	July 1986		
Steve Perryman ‡	England	November 1986	January 1987		
Phil Holder ‡	England	January 1987	24 August 1990		
Wilf Rostron	England	January 1991	11 May 1993		
Kevin Lock	England	1993	1997		
Clive Walker	England	1997	November 1997		
Glenn Cockerill	England	November 1997	June 1998		
Ray Lewington ‡	England	1998	20 November 2000	(Note: Lewington led a three-man coaching team, which also included Terry Bullivant and Brian Sparrow.)	
Terry Bullivant	England	20 November 2000	2001		
Wally Downes ‡	England	2001	8 August 2002		
Garry Thompson	England	October 2002	20 March 2004		
Adrian Whitbread	England	30 March 2004	31 May 2006		
Paul Mortimer	England	16 June 2006	18 November 2006		
Alan Reeves	England	21 December 2006	10 April 2007		
Andy Scott ‡	England	9 May 2007	11 December 2007		
Scott Marshall	Scotland	12 December 2007	10 March 2008	(Note: Marshall assisted Andy Scott while continuing in his role as youth team manager.)	
Terry Bullivant	England	11 March 2008	3 February 2011		
Mark Warburton ‡	England	3 February 2011	7 May 2011		
Alan Kernaghan	Republic of Ireland	24 February 2012	7 December 2013		
David Weir	Scotland	16 December 2013	31 May 2015		
Roy Hendriksen	Netherlands	1 June 2015	27 September 2015		
Paul Williams	England	28 September 2015	30 November 2015		
Richard O'Kelly	England	30 November 2015	11 October 2018		
Thomas Frank ‡	Denmark	8 December 2016	16 October 2018		
Lars Friis	Denmark	16 October 2018	26 October 2018	(Note: Friis assisted Thomas Frank while continuing in his role as Personal Development Coach.)	
Brian Riemer	Denmark	26 October 2018	2 December 2022		
Claus Nørgaard	Denmark	5 December 2022	16 June 2025		

== Awards ==
=== Football League Manager of the Month ===
Manager	Nationality	Second tier	Third tier	Fourth tier	Total	Ref.
Micky Adams	England	—	March 1998	—	1	
Martin Allen	England	—	September 2004, February 2006	—	2	
Frank Blunstone	England	—	—	September 1971, March 1972	2	
Lee Carsley	Republic of Ireland	October 2015	—	—	1	
Steve Coppell	England	—	October 2001	—	1	
John Docherty	Scotland	—	—	April 1975	1	
Bill Dodgin Jr.	England	—	—	March 1978	1	
Wally Downes	England	—	August 2002	—	1	
Thomas Frank	Denmark	June 2020, December 2020	—	—	2	
Phil Holder	England	December 1992	December 1990, November 1991, April 1992	—	4	
Ron Noades	England	—	—	August 1998	1	
Steve Perryman	England	—	January 1989	—	1	
Uwe Rösler	Germany	—	November 2013	—	1	
Andy Scott	England	—	October 2010	April 2009	2	
Mark Warburton	England	November 2014	December 2013	—	2	
David Webb	England	—	January 1995, August 1996	—	2	

=== Other awards ===
- League Managers Association Performance of the Week:
  - Ron Noades – Brentford 3–0 West Bromwich Albion, League Cup first round, second leg, 18 August 1998)
  - Andy Scott – Darlington 1–3 Brentford, League Two, 25 April 2009
  - Mark Warburton – Brentford 4–0 Wolverhampton Wanderers, League One, 29 November 2014
  - Thomas Frank
    - Brentford 7–0 Luton Town, Championship, 30 November 2019
    - Fulham 0–2 Brentford, Championship, 20 June 2020
    - Bournemouth 0–1 Brentford, Championship, 24 April 2021
    - Brentford 2–0 Arsenal, Premier League, 13 August 2021
    - Chelsea 1–4 Brentford, Premier League, 2 April 2022
    - Brentford 4–0 Manchester United, Premier League, 13 August 2022
    - Manchester City 1–2 Brentford, Premier League, 12 November 2022
    - Brentford 3–1 Liverpool, Premier League, 2 January 2023
    - Chelsea 0–2 Brentford, Premier League, 28 October 2023
    - Brentford 3–2 Nottingham Forest, Premier League, 20 January 2024
    - Southampton 0–5 Brentford, Premier League, 4 January 2025
  - Keith Andrews
    - Everton 2–4 Brentford, Premier League, 4 January 2026
- London Football Awards Manager of the Year:
  - Mark Warburton (2013–14)
  - Thomas Frank (2019–20)
- DBU Coach of the Year: Thomas Frank (2020)
