= 1962–63 Brentford F.C. season =

English football team season

Brentford
1962–63 season
- Chairman: Jack Dunnett
- Manager: Malky MacDonald
- Stadium: Griffin Park
- Fourth Division: 1st (promoted)
- FA Cup: First round
- League Cup: Second round
- Top goalscorer: League: Dick (23); All: Dick (24)
- Highest home attendance: 15,820
- Lowest home attendance: 6,800
- Average home league attendance: 11,418
Home colours

During the 1962–63 English football season, Brentford competed in the Football League Fourth Division for the first time in the club's history. 67 goals from former international forwards John Dick, Billy McAdams and Johnny Brooks helped fire the Bees to the division title and an immediate return to the Third Division.

== Season summary ==
Wing half Matt Crowe transferred to Brentford for a £5,000 fee in July 1962.

After suffering relegation for the Fourth Division at the end of the 1961–62 season, Brentford was at one of the lowest points in its history. The relegation completed a 15-year fall from the First Division to the bottom tier and the average attendance at Griffin Park had fallen by 18,000 in that time. Chairman Jack Dunnett pledged that he and his directors would invest money in the first team squad, which had been ravaged by a mass clearout over the previous year (in a bid to cut costs amidst the abolition of the maximum wage). Club legend George Francis was sold to Gillingham for a £4,000 fee, ending a six-year Brentford career in which he scored 136 goals in 280 matches. Funds were made available to manager Malky MacDonald and he spent £5,000 on Norwich City wing half Matt Crowe and £10,000 on Leeds United's former Northern Ireland centre forward Billy McAdams. Tommy Cavanagh was appointed as trainer to replace the departed Fred Monk.

Three wins and four defeats from the opening seven matches led to the chequebook opening again, with the £17,500 purchase of West Ham United's experienced inside left John Dick breaking Brentford's incoming transfer record. The transfer meant the Fourth Division Bees could field a forward line of former international players – Dick (Scotland), McAdams (Northern Ireland) and Brooks (England). The team showed excellent form between September 1962 and the end of the year, rising from mid-table to 2nd place. John Dick had as yet failed to live up to his status, but Billy McAdams ended the year on 15 goals and Johnny Brooks on 12.

The football calendar was frozen out between late December 1962 and February 1963, but when league play got back underway, Brentford solidified their position in the promotion places. Another £18,500 was spent on new signings John Fielding and Mel Scott in March. John Dick came into form in mid-March and supported by McAdams and Brooks, his 15 goals in the final 17 matches helped fire Brentford to the Fourth Division title. The title win made Brentford the first club to win each of the Second, Third and Fourth Division championships.

Three records were set or equalled during the season:

- Most points in a league season: 62 (two points for a win)
- Most league goals scored in a season: 98
- Most consecutive league appearances: 168 – Gerry Cakebread (1 November 1958 – 18 August 1963)

== League table ==
Pos	Team	Pld	W	D	L	GF	GA	GAv	Pts	Promotion or relegation
1	Brentford (C, P)	46	27	8	11	98	64	1.531	62	Promotion to the Third Division
2	Oldham Athletic (P)	46	24	11	11	95	60	1.583	59	Promotion to the Third Division
3	Crewe Alexandra (P)	46	24	11	11	86	58	1.483	59	Promotion to the Third Division
4	Mansfield Town (P)	46	24	9	13	108	69	1.565	57	Promotion to the Third Division
5	Gillingham	46	22	13	11	71	49	1.449	57	

Source: rsssf.com
(C) Champions; (P) Promoted

== Results ==
Brentford's goal tally listed first.

=== Legend ===
Win	Draw	Loss

=== Football League Fourth Division ===
No.	Date	Opponent	Venue	Result	Attendance	Scorer(s)
1	18 August 1962	Doncaster Rovers	A	2–0	8,247	McAdams (2)
2	21 August 1962	Gillingham	H	1–2	11,914	Edgley
3	25 August 1962	Mansfield Town	H	1–3	8,340	McAdams
4	29 August 1962	Gillingham	A	4–1	8,832	Brooks (3), Block
5	1 September 1962	Workington	A	1–3	3,373	Summers
6	8 September 1962	Exeter City	H	3–1	11,153	McAdams, Dick, Hughes (og)
7	12 September 1962	Crewe Alexandra	A	0–3	6,673	
8	15 September 1962	Chesterfield	A	1–1	6,114	McAdams
9	18 September 1962	Stockport County	H	2–1	10,146	Dick, McAdams
10	22 September 1962	Rochdale	H	1–0	10,753	McLeod
11	29 September 1962	Barrow	H	2–1	9,541	Dick (2)
12	2 October 1962	Hartlepools United	H	4–0	10,729	Dick (2), McAdams, Block
13	6 October 1962	Darlington	A	3–1	4,683	Brooks (2, 1 pen), Block
14	13 October 1962	Southport	H	3–3	11,651	McAdams, Brooks (2, 1 pen)
15	20 October 1962	Aldershot	A	0–0	8,609	
16	27 October 1962	Newport County	H	3–1	11,312	McAdams (2), Block
17	10 November 1962	Bradford City	H	5–2	8,396	McAdams (3), McLeod, Brooks (pen)
18	24 November 1962	Stockport County	A	1–2	3,337	Block
19	1 December 1962	Lincoln City	A	3–1	5,470	Brooks, Summers, McAdams
20	8 December 1962	Oldham Athletic	H	2–1	12,144	Anthony, Brooks
21	15 December 1962	Doncaster Rovers	H	1–0	9,589	Meadows (og)
22	22 December 1962	Mansfield Town	A	2–1	9,468	Brooks (2)
23	26 December 1962	Chester	H	2–1	9,724	Dick, McAdams
24	16 February 1963	Barrow	A	1–1	4,187	Summers
25	23 February 1963	Darlington	H	1–3	9,272	Dick
26	2 March 1963	Southport	A	0–1	3,136	
27	4 March 1963	Tranmere Rovers	A	2–1	8,226	Summers (2)
28	9 March 1963	Aldershot	H	4–2	8,390	Brooks (2, 1 pen), Henry (og), McAdams
29	12 March 1963	Torquay United	H	2–2	13,084	Block, Brooks
30	16 March 1963	Newport County	A	4–1	2,891	McAdams, Dick (2), Brooks (pen)
31	20 March 1963	Rochdale	A	5–3	5,680	Dick (3), McAdams, Brooks
32	23 March 1963	Oxford United	H	4–0	13,756	Block, Higginson, McAdams (2)
33	29 March 1963	Torquay United	A	1–1	5,570	McAdams
34	3 April 1963	Chester	A	2–1	5,991	Dick (2)
35	6 April 1963	Tranmere Rovers	H	4–0	13,383	McLeod (2), Dick, Brooks (pen)
36	12 April 1963	York City	A	1–1	7,757	Brooks (pen)
37	13 April 1963	Bradford City	A	1–2	3,070	Dick
38	15 April 1963	York City	H	2–1	15,070	Dick (2)
39	20 April 1963	Lincoln City	H	3–2	11,384	Dick, Block, McAdams
40	22 April 1963	Hartlepools United	A	1–2	3,755	Dick
41	27 April 1963	Oldham Athletic	A	1–2	17,771	Brooks
42	30 April 1963	Crewe Alexandra	H	3–1	15,820	Brooks (pen), Dick
42	4 May 1963	Chesterfield	H	2–1	13,903	Dick, Fielding
44	11 May 1963	Oxford United	A	1–2	11,247	Summers
45	18 May 1963	Exeter City	A	2–2	3,600	Hales, Scott
46	23 May 1963	Workington	H	4–3	13,158	Fielding (2), Hales, Brown (og)

=== FA Cup ===
Round	Date	Opponent	Venue	Result	Attendance
1R	3 November 1962	Aldershot	A	0–1	12,200

=== Football League Cup ===
Round	Date	Opponent	Venue	Result	Attendance	Scorer(s)
1R	4 September 1962	Wrexham	H	3–0	6,800	Summers, McAdams, Edgley
2R	26 September 1962	Sheffield United	H	1–4	13,850	Dick

- Sources: 100 Years Of Brentford, Statto

== Playing squad ==
Players' ages are as of the opening day of the 1962–63 season.

Pos.	Name	Nat.	Date of birth (age)	Signed from	Signed in	Notes
Goalkeepers
GK	Gerry Cakebread	(England)	1 April 1936 (aged 26)	Youth	1954	
GK	Fred Ryecraft	(England)	28 August 1939 (aged 22)	Southall	1959	
Defenders
DF	Tom Anthony	(England)	16 August 1943 (aged 19)	Youth	1961	
DF	Ken Coote (c)	(England)	19 May 1928 (aged 34)	Wembley	1949	
DF	Jimmy Gitsham	(England)	12 May 1942 (aged 20)	Youth	1959	
DF	Alan Hawley	(England)	7 June 1946 (aged 16)	Youth	1962	
Midfielders
HB	Matt Crowe	(Scotland)	4 July 1932 (aged 30)	Norwich City	1962	
HB	Ian Dargie	(England)	3 October 1931 (aged 30)	Tonbridge	1952	
HB	Peter Gelson	(England)	18 October 1941 (aged 20)	Youth	1961	
HB	Tommy Higginson	(Scotland)	6 January 1937 (aged 25)	Kilmarnock	1959	
HB	Mel Scott	(England)	26 September 1939 (aged 22)	Chelsea	1963	
Forwards
FW	Micky Block	(England)	28 January 1940 (aged 22)	Chelsea	1962	
FW	Johnny Brooks	(England)	23 December 1931 (aged 30)	Chelsea	1961	
FW	John Dick	(Scotland)	19 March 1930 (aged 32)	West Ham United	1962	
FW	John Fielding	(England)	2 September 1939 (aged 22)	Southport	1963	
FW	Johnny Hales	(Scotland)	15 May 1940 (aged 22)	St Roch's	1958	
FW	Billy McAdams	(Northern Ireland)	20 January 1934 (aged 28)	Leeds United	1962	
FW	George McLeod	(Scotland)	30 November 1932 (aged 29)	Luton Town	1958	
FW	George Summers	(Scotland)	30 July 1941 (aged 21)	Shawfield	1959	
Players who left the club mid-season
FW	Brian Edgley	(England)	26 August 1937 (aged 24)	Cardiff City	1961	Transferred to Barnsley

- Sources: 100 Years Of Brentford, Timeless Bees

== Coaching staff ==
Name	Role
(Scotland) Malky MacDonald	Manager
(England) Tommy Cavanagh	Trainer

== Statistics ==
=== Appearances and goals ===

Brentford's highest appearance-makers in each position during the Football League season.

Pos	Nat	Name	League		FA Cup		League Cup		Total	
Pos	Nat	Name	Apps	Goals	Apps	Goals	Apps	Goals	Apps	Goals
GK	(England)	Gerry Cakebread	28	0	1	0	2	0	31	0
GK	(England)	Fred Ryecraft	18	0	0	0	0	0	18	0
DF	(England)	Tom Anthony	33	1	1	0	1	0	35	1
DF	(England)	Ken Coote	46	0	1	0	2	0	49	0
DF	(England)	Jimmy Gitsham	16	0	0	0	2	0	18	0
DF	(England)	Alan Hawley	2	0	0	0	0	0	2	0
HB	(Scotland)	Matt Crowe	39	0	1	0	2	0	42	0
HB	(England)	Ian Dargie	3	0	0	0	0	0	3	0
HB	(England)	Peter Gelson	29	0	1	0	1	0	31	0
HB	(Scotland)	Tommy Higginson	46	1	1	0	2	0	49	1
HB	(England)	Mel Scott	17	1	—		—		17	1
FW	(England)	Micky Block	42	8	1	0	2	0	45	8
FW	(England)	Johnny Brooks	39	22	1	0	1	0	41	22
FW	(Scotland)	John Dick	38	23	1	0	1	1	40	24
FW	(England)	Brian Edgley	4	1	—		1	1	5	2
FW	(England)	John Fielding	7	3	—		—		7	3
FW	(Scotland)	Johnny Hales	4	2	0	0	0	0	4	2
FW	(Northern Ireland)	Billy McAdams	34	22	1	0	2	1	37	23
FW	(Scotland)	George McLeod	46	4	1	0	2	0	49	4
FW	(Scotland)	George Summers	15	6	0	0	1	1	16	7

- Players listed in italics left the club mid-season.
- Source: 100 Years Of Brentford

=== Goalscorers ===
Pos.	Nat	Player	FL4	FAC	FLC	Total
FW	(Scotland)	John Dick	23	0	1	24
FW	(Northern Ireland)	Billy McAdams	22	0	1	23
FW	(England)	Johnny Brooks	22	0	0	22
FW	(England)	Micky Block	8	0	0	8
FW	(Scotland)	George Summers	6	0	1	7
FW	(Scotland)	George McLeod	4	0	0	4
FW	(England)	John Fielding	3	—	—	3
FW	(Scotland)	Johnny Hales	2	0	0	2
FW	(England)	Brian Edgley	1	—	1	2
HB	(England)	Mel Scott	1	—	—	1
DF	(England)	Tom Anthony	1	0	0	1
HB	(Scotland)	Tommy Higginson	1	0	0	1
Opponents			4	0	0	4
Total			98	0	4	102

- Players listed in italics left the club mid-season.
- Source: 100 Years Of Brentford

=== Management ===
Name	Nat	From	To	Record All Comps					Record League				
Name	Nat	From	To	P	W	D	L	W %	P	W	D	L	W %
Malky MacDonald	(Scotland)	18 August 1962	23 May 1963	49	28	8	13	57.14	46	27	8	11	58.70

=== Summary ===
Games played	49 (46 Fourth Division, 1 FA Cup, 2 League Cup)
Games won	28 (27 Fourth Division, 0 FA Cup, 1 League Cup)
Games drawn	8 (8 Fourth Division, 0 FA Cup, 0 League Cup)
Games lost	13 (11 Fourth Division, 1 FA Cup, 1 League Cup)
Goals scored	102 (98 Fourth Division, 0 FA Cup, 4 League Cup)
Goals conceded	69 (64 Fourth Division, 1 FA Cup, 4 League Cup)
Clean sheets	8 (7 Fourth Division, 0 FA Cup, 1 League Cup)
Biggest league win	4–0 on three occasions
Worst league defeat	3–0 versus Crewe Alexandra, 12 September 1962
Most appearances	49, Ken Coote, Tommy Higginson, George McLeod (46 Fourth Division, 2 FA Cup, 3 League Cup)
Top scorer (league)	23, John Dick
Top scorer (all competitions)	24, John Dick

== Transfers & loans ==
Players transferred in
Date	Pos.	Name	Previous club	Fee	Ref.
June 1962	DF	(England) Alan Hawley	n/a	n/a	
July 1962	HB	(Scotland) Matt Crowe	(England) Norwich City	£5,000	
July 1962	FW	(Northern Ireland) Billy McAdams	(England) Leeds United	£10,000	
September 1962	FW	(Scotland) John Dick	(England) West Ham United	£17,500	
26 March 1963	FW	(England) John Fielding	(England) Southport	£7,000	
March 1963	HB	(England) Mel Scott	(England) Chelsea	£12,500	
Players transferred out
Date	Pos.	Name	Subsequent club	Fee	Ref.
9 June 1962	FW	(Scotland) Dick Lowrie	(Scotland) Morton	n/a	
August 1962	FW	(England) George Francis	(England) Gillingham	£4,000	
1 September 1962	FW	(Scotland) Danny O'Donnell	(Scotland) Brechin City	n/a	
November 1962	FW	(England) Brian Edgley	(England) Barnsley	n/a	
Players released
Date	Pos.	Name	Subsequent club	Join date	Ref.
May 1963	HB	(England) Ian Dargie	(England) Yiewsley	1963	
May 1963	DF	(England) Jimmy Gitsham	(England) Romford	1963	
