= 1961–62 Brentford F.C. season =

English football team season

Brentford
1961–62 season
- Chairman: Frank Davis (until October 1961); Jack Dunnett (from October 1961)
- Manager: Malky MacDonald
- Stadium: Griffin Park
- Third Division: 23rd (relegated)
- FA Cup: Third round
- League Cup: First round
- Top goalscorer: League: Francis (14); All: Francis (15)
- Highest home attendance: 19,700
- Lowest home attendance: 3,600
- Average home league attendance: 8,483
Home colours

During the 1961–62 English football season, Brentford competed in the Football League Third Division. Financial cutbacks and a reduction in size of the playing squad led to Brentford's relegation to the Fourth Division for the first time in the club's history.

== Season summary ==
=== Off-season ===
After a number of seasons in which Brentford challenged and failed to win promotion from the Third Division with a wafer-thin squad, low attendances and a debt of over £50,000 meant that the 1961 off-season would be a period of turmoil. A threat of a players' strike in support of the removal of the maximum wage during the second half of the previous season was averted and it was revealed that the club had turned down £12,000 and £9,000 bids respectively for prolific strike partners Jim Towers and George Francis during the 1959–60 season – a period when the club was still confident of promotion from the Third Division. With those expectations dampened by mediocre performances in the 1960–61 season, up-and-coming outside left John Docherty was sold for £17,000 during the final months of the campaign. Towers and particularly Francis performed poorly by their standards during the 1960–61 season and consequently bids of a similar amount to that of the previous year failed to materialise.

Future Nottingham Central MP Jack Dunnett joined the board in July 1961 and took over as chairman from Frank Davis three months later. For the first time since relegation to the Third Division South in 1953, Brentford conducted an end-of-season clearout in a bid to reduce the squad size and wage bill. Ken Horne, Billy Goundry, George Bristow, Dennis Heath and Eric Parsons, who had each made over 100 appearances for the club, were released, as were five other bit-part players. Most galling for the Brentford supporters was the sale of forwards Jim Towers and George Francis (who had accounted for 299 goals between them since 1954) to divisional and local rivals Queens Park Rangers for a combined £8,000 fee. £6,000 Cardiff City forward Brian Edgley was signed as a replacement and Ray Reeves and Jimmy Belcher were brought in to strengthen the back lines. The signings took the squad size to just 16 players, six of whom held a part-time status (Cakebread, Dargie, Gelson, Gitsham, Reeves and Ryecraft) and of those, two (Gelson and Ryecraft) were juniors who had yet to make their senior debuts. In addition, assistant trainer Jack Holliday (the club's record goalscorer) was sacked and trainer Fred Monk resigned in April 1962.

=== Season ===
Brentford had a dreadful start to the 1961–62 season, losing 8 of the first 9 matches in all competitions. The signing of £6,000 former England international forward Johnny Brooks in early September 1961 helped boost the team's morale enough for them to register their first point of the season on 9 September 1961, courtesy of a goalless draw with Southend United at Griffin Park. After another loss and the Bees' first two victories of the season, three successive defeats led manager Malky MacDonald to re-sign forward George Francis from Queens Park Rangers on 6 October. Francis' return helped inspire a victory over Swindon Town 24 hours later, courtesy of a Johnny Rainford goal. The FA Cup provided a welcome distraction from the league, in which Brentford were firmly rooted in the relegation zone. The Bees advanced to the third round of the FA Cup, taking high-flying Second Division club Leyton Orient to a replay before being knocked out. After the defeat, the board again reached for the chequebook and signed outside forward Micky Block from Chelsea for a £5,000 fee.

Poor form in the opening months of 1962 failed to avert the relegation threat and a bid to buy back Jim Towers from Queens Park Rangers failed, but a run of three wins and one draw in late March and early April lifted Brentford to 21st, the club's highest position of the season so far. Of the following four matches, a victory, a draw and two defeats left the Bees' in 23rd place, with their destiny out of their own hands. Victory for 21st-place Barnsley over 20th-place Torquay United on 2 May ended the Bees' hopes of survival. Brentford's 9-year stay in the Third Division officially ended the following day after a 2–0 defeat to Hull City at Boothferry Park. The relegation completed a drop from the First Division in 1947 to the Fourth Division in 1962, a 15-year fall from grace.

== League table ==
Pos	Team	Pld	W	D	L	GF	GA	GAv	Pts	Promotion or relegation
20	Barnsley	46	13	12	21	71	95	0.747	38	
21	Torquay United (R)	46	15	6	25	76	100	0.760	36	Relegation to the Fourth Division
22	Lincoln City (R)	46	9	17	20	57	87	0.655	35	Relegation to the Fourth Division
23	Brentford (R)	46	13	8	25	53	93	0.570	34	Relegation to the Fourth Division
24	Newport County (R)	46	7	8	31	46	102	0.451	22	Relegation to the Fourth Division

(R) Relegated

== Results ==
Brentford's goal tally listed first.

=== Legend ===
Win	Draw	Loss

=== Football League Third Division ===
No.	Date	Opponent	Venue	Result	Attendance	Scorer(s)
1	19 August 1961	Queens Park Rangers	A	0–3	16,790	
2	22 August 1961	Halifax Town	H	0–2	7,509	
3	26 August 1961	Reading	H	1–2	9,630	Spiers (og)
4	28 August 1961	Halifax Town	A	0–1	7,603	
5	2 September 1961	Newport County	A	1–6	5,757	Edgley
6	5 September 1961	Grimsby Town	A	0–1	8,800	
7	9 September 1961	Southend United	H	0–0	7,100	
8	16 September 1961	Notts County	A	1–3	7,977	Edgley
9	19 September 1961	Coventry City	H	2–1	6,100	Higginson, Belcher
10	23 September 1961	Shrewsbury Town	H	4–0	7,000	Edgley (2), Brooks, Rainford
11	25 September 1961	Coventry City	A	0–2	10,243	
12	30 September 1961	Peterborough United	A	0–6	12,654	
13	3 October 1961	Bristol City	A	0–3	10,700	
14	7 October 1961	Swindon Town	H	1–0	7,500	Rainford
15	10 October 1961	Bristol City	H	0–2	8,569	
16	14 October 1961	Torquay United	A	0–3	4,836	
17	21 October 1961	Portsmouth	H	3–2	9,600	Brooks, Edgley, Francis
18	28 October 1961	Barnsley	A	2–2	6,478	Summers, Edgley
19	11 November 1961	Watford	A	1–2	8,333	Francis
20	18 November 1961	Bournemouth & Boscombe Athletic	H	2–2	9,600	Francis, Edgley
21	2 December 1961	Lincoln City	H	1–0	7,980	Summers
22	9 December 1961	Northampton Town	A	0–5	10,339	
23	16 December 1961	Queens Park Rangers	H	1–4	11,800	Francis
24	23 December 1961	Reading	A	0–4	7,211	
25	26 December 1961	Bradford Park Avenue	H	2–0	5,100	Edgley (pen), Francis
26	13 January 1962	Newport County	H	3–1	7,750	Francis, Higginson, McLeod
27	20 January 1962	Southend United	A	0–0	6,835	
28	27 January 1962	Crystal Palace	A	2–2	19,323	Brooks, Block
39	2 February 1962	Notts County	H	0–1	9,200	
30	10 February 1962	Shrewsbury Town	A	3–1	6,037	Brooks, Francis, McLeod
31	17 February 1962	Peterborough United	H	2–0	11,000	Brooks (pen), McLeod
32	23 February 1962	Swindon Town	A	2–5	7,089	Summers, Francis
33	3 March 1962	Torquay United	H	0–2	7,450	
34	10 March 1962	Portsmouth	A	0–4	15,256	
35	17 March 1962	Barnsley	H	1–1	6,050	Francis
36	24 March 1962	Hull City	A	0–3	3,432	
37	30 March 1962	Watford	H	3–0	6,450	Francis (2), Summers
38	4 April 1962	Bradford Park Avenue	A	2–1	4,812	Francis, Summers
39	7 April 1962	Bournemouth & Boscombe Athletic	A	1–1	10,736	Block
40	13 April 1962	Crystal Palace	H	4–2	9,900	Brooks (2, 1 pen), Francis, Wood (og)
41	20 April 1962	Port Vale	H	1–2	11,160	Brooks (pen)
42	21 April 1962	Lincoln City	A	3–3	5,402	Summers (2), Gelson
43	23 April 1962	Port Vale	A	0–3	5,871	
44	27 April 1962	Northampton Town	H	3–0	6,750	Francis, Brooks, Summers
45	1 May 1962	Grimsby Town	H	0–2	18,126	
46	3 May 1962	Hull City	H	0–2	3,600	

=== FA Cup ===
Round	Date	Opponent	Venue	Result	Attendance	Scorer(s)
1R	4 November 1961	Oxford United	H	3–0	13,500	Summers, Edgley (2)
2R	25 November 1961	Aldershot	A	2–2	12,846	Edgley, Francis
2R (replay)	28 November 1961	Aldershot	H	2–0	17,800	Edgley, Brooks
3R	6 January 1962	Leyton Orient	H	1–1	19,700	Summers
3R (replay)	8 January 1962	Leyton Orient	A	1–2	22,690	Higginson

=== Football League Cup ===
Round	Date	Opponent	Venue	Result	Attendance	Scorer
1R	13 September 1961	Leeds United	A	1–4	4,500	McLeod

- Sources: 100 Years Of Brentford, Statto

== Playing squad ==
Players' ages are as of the opening day of the 1961–62 season.

Pos.	Name	Nat.	Date of birth (age)	Signed from	Signed in	Notes
Goalkeepers
GK	Gerry Cakebread	(England)	1 April 1936 (aged 25)	Youth	1954	
Defenders
DF	Ken Coote (c)	(England)	19 May 1928 (aged 33)	Wembley	1949	
DF	Jimmy Gitsham	(England)	12 May 1942 (aged 19)	Youth	1959	
DF	Ray Reeves	(England)	12 August 1931 (aged 30)	Reading	1961	
DF	Tom Wilson	(England)	3 July 1930 (aged 31)	Fulham	1957	
Midfielders
HB	Jimmy Belcher	(England)	31 October 1932 (aged 28)	Ipswich Town	1961	
HB	Ian Dargie	(England)	3 October 1931 (aged 29)	Tonbridge	1952	
HB	Peter Gelson	(England)	18 October 1941 (aged 19)	Youth	1961	
HB	Tommy Higginson	(Scotland)	6 January 1937 (aged 24)	Kilmarnock	1959	
Forwards
FW	Micky Block	(England)	28 January 1940 (aged 21)	Chelsea	1962	
FW	Johnny Brooks	(England)	23 December 1931 (aged 29)	Chelsea	1961	
FW	Brian Edgley	(England)	26 August 1937 (aged 23)	Cardiff City	1961	
FW	George Francis	(England)	4 February 1934 (aged 27)	Queens Park Rangers	1961	
FW	Johnny Hales	(Scotland)	15 May 1940 (aged 21)	St Roch's	1958	
FW	George McLeod	(Scotland)	30 November 1932 (aged 28)	Luton Town	1958	
FW	Danny O'Donnell	(Scotland)	27 February 1939 (aged 22)	Kirkintilloch Rob Roy	1960	
FW	George Summers	(Scotland)	30 July 1941 (aged 20)	Shawfield	1959	
Players who left the club mid-season
FW	Johnny Rainford	(England)	11 December 1930 (aged 30)	Cardiff City	1953	Transferred to Tonbridge

- Sources: 100 Years Of Brentford, Timeless Bees

== Coaching staff ==
Name	Role
(Scotland) Malky MacDonald	Manager
(England) Fred Monk	Trainer

== Statistics ==
=== Appearances and goals ===

Brentford's highest appearance-makers in each position during the Football League season.

Pos	Nat	Name	League		FA Cup		League Cup		Total	
Pos	Nat	Name	Apps	Goals	Apps	Goals	Apps	Goals	Apps	Goals
GK	(England)	Gerry Cakebread	46	0	5	0	1	0	52	0
DF	(England)	Ken Coote	45	0	5	0	1	0	51	0
DF	(England)	Jimmy Gitsham	34	0	5	0	0	0	39	0
DF	(England)	Ray Reeves	5	0	0	0	0	0	5	0
DF	(England)	Tom Wilson	16	0	0	0	1	0	17	0
HB	(England)	Jimmy Belcher	30	1	5	0	1	0	36	1
HB	(England)	Ian Dargie	35	0	1	0	1	0	37	0
HB	(England)	Peter Gelson	24	1	4	0	0	0	28	1
HB	(Scotland)	Tommy Higginson	46	2	5	1	1	0	52	3
FW	(England)	Micky Block	20	2	—		—		20	2
FW	(England)	Johnny Brooks	38	10	5	1	0	0	43	11
FW	(England)	Brian Edgley	27	8	5	4	1	0	33	12
FW	(England)	George Francis	32	14	5	1	—		37	15
FW	(Scotland)	Johnny Hales	8	0	0	0	1	0	9	0
FW	(Scotland)	George McLeod	46	3	5	0	1	1	52	4
FW	(Scotland)	Danny O'Donnell	9	0	0	0	0	0	9	0
FW	(England)	Johnny Rainford	15	2	1	0	1	0	17	2
FW	(Scotland)	George Summers	30	8	4	2	1	0	35	10

- Players listed in italics left the club mid-season.
- Source: 100 Years Of Brentford

=== Goalscorers ===
Pos.	Nat	Player	FL3	FAC	FLC	Total
FW	(England)	George Francis	14	1	—	15
FW	(England)	Brian Edgley	8	4	0	12
FW	(England)	Johnny Brooks	10	1	0	11
FW	(Scotland)	George Summers	8	2	0	10
FW	(Scotland)	George McLeod	3	0	1	4
HB	(Scotland)	Tommy Higginson	2	1	0	3
FW	(England)	Micky Block	2	—	—	2
FW	(England)	Johnny Rainford	2	0	0	2
HB	(England)	Jimmy Belcher	1	0	0	1
HB	(England)	Peter Gelson	1	0	0	1
Opponents			2	0	0	2
Total			53	9	1	63

- Players listed in italics left the club mid-season.
- Source: 100 Years Of Brentford

=== Management ===
Name	Nat	From	To	Record All Comps					Record League				
Name	Nat	From	To	P	W	D	L	W %	P	W	D	L	W %
Malky MacDonald	(Scotland)	19 August 1961	3 May 1962	52	15	10	27	28.85	46	13	8	25	28.26

=== Summary ===
Games played	52 (46 Third Division, 5 FA Cup, 1 League Cup)
Games won	15 (13 Third Division, 2 FA Cup, 0 League Cup)
Games drawn	10 (8 Third Division, 2 FA Cup, 0 League Cup)
Games lost	27 (25 Third Division, 1 FA Cup, 1 League Cup)
Goals scored	63 (53 Third Division, 9 FA Cup, 1 League Cup)
Goals conceded	102 (93 Third Division, 5 FA Cup, 4 League Cup)
Clean sheets	12 (10 Third Division, 2 FA Cup, 0 League Cup)
Biggest league win	4–0 versus Shrewsbury Town, 23 September 1961
Worst league defeat	6–0 versus Peterborough United, 30 September 1961
Most appearances	52, Gerry Cakebread, Tommy Higginson, George McLeod (46 Third Division, 2 FA Cup, 3 League Cup)
Top scorer (league)	14, George Francis
Top scorer (all competitions)	15, George Francis

== Transfers & loans ==
Players transferred in
Date	Pos.	Name	Previous club	Fee	Ref.
5 June 1961	FW	(England) Brian Edgley	(Wales) Cardiff City	£6,000	
July 1961	HB	(England) Jimmy Belcher	(England) Ipswich Town	n/a	
July 1961	DF	(England) Ray Reeves	(England) Reading	n/a	
2 September 1961	FW	(Scotland) Dick Lowrie	(Scotland) St Roch's	n/a	
2 September 1961	FW	(Scotland) Hugh McLaughlin	(Scotland) St Roch's	n/a	
September 1961	FW	(England) Johnny Brooks	(England) Chelsea	£6,000	
6 October 1961	FW	(England) George Francis	(England) Queens Park Rangers	n/a	
December 1961	DF	(England) Tom Anthony	n/a	n/a	
1961	DF	(England) Tim Soutar	n/a	n/a	
January 1962	FW	(England) Micky Block	(England) Chelsea	£5,000	
Players transferred out
Date	Pos.	Name	Subsequent club	Fee	Ref.
31 May 1961	FW	(England) George Francis	(England) Queens Park Rangers	£4,000	
31 May 1961	FW	(England) Jim Towers	(England) Queens Park Rangers	£4,000	
1962	FW	(England) Johnny Rainford	(England) Tonbridge	Free	
Players released
Date	Pos.	Name	Subsequent club	Join date	Ref.
May 1962	HB	(England) Jimmy Belcher	(England) Margate	1962	
May 1962	DF	(England) Ray Reeves	(England) Dover	1962	
May 1962	DF	(England) Tom Wilson	(England) Folkestone Town	1962	

== Awards ==
- Supporters' Player of the Year: Ken Coote
