= John Fielding (disambiguation) =

John Fielding (1721–1780) was an English magistrate and social reformer.

Other notable people named John Fielding include:

- John Williams (VC) (1857–1932), a Welsh soldier and recipient of the Victoria Cross, born John Fielding
- John Fielding (footballer, born 1939), English footballer, winger for Brentford, Southport and Grimsby Town
- John Fielding (footballer, born 1982), English footballer, defender for York City
