= Micky Block =

English footballer (1940–2019)

Personal information
- Full name: Michael John Block
- Date of birth: 28 January 1940
- Place of birth: Ipswich, England
- Date of death: 12 December 2019 (aged 79)
- Place of death: Brent, England
- Height: 5 ft 11 in (1.80 m)
- Position: Right winger

Youth career
- 1955–1957: Chelsea

Senior career*
Years	Team	Apps	(Gls)
1957–1962	Chelsea	37	(6)
1962–1966	Brentford	146	(30)
1966–1967	Watford	13	(2)
1967–1969	Chelmsford City		
Total		196	(38)

International career
- England Youth
- * Club domestic league appearances and goals

Michael John Block (28 January 1940 – 12 December 2019) was an English professional footballer who played as a right winger. He made nearly 200 Football League appearances for Chelsea, Brentford and Watford over a 10-year period.

== Career ==
Born in Ipswich, Block began his career with the youth team at First Division club Chelsea and played in both legs of the 1958 FA Youth Cup Final. Block progressed to the Chelsea first team and made 40 appearances and scored six goals between 1957 and 1962.

Block left Chelsea for Brentford for £5,000 in January 1962. While with Brentford, he was the provider of assists for many goals scored by the club's all-international frontline of Johnny Brooks, Billy McAdams and John Dick. He later played for Watford, before dropping into non-League football with Chelmsford City in 1967.

== Career statistics ==
Appearances and goals by club, season and competition
Club	Season	League			FA Cup		League Cup		Europe		Total	
Club	Season	Division	Apps	Goals	Apps	Goals	Apps	Goals	Apps	Goals	Apps	Goals
Chelsea	1957–58	First Division	20	4	0	0	—		—		20	4
Chelsea	1958–59	First Division	13	1	2	0	—		1 (Note: Appearance in Inter-Cities Fairs Cup)	0	16	1
Chelsea	1959–60	First Division	2	0	0	0	—		—		2	0
Chelsea	1960–61	First Division	1	0	0	0	0	0	—		1	0
Chelsea	1961–62	First Division	1	1	0	0	0	0	—		1	1
Chelsea	Total		37	6	2	0	0	0	1	0	40	6
Brentford	1961–62	Third Division	20	2	—		—		—		20	2
Brentford	1962–63	Fourth Division	42	8	1	0	2	0	—		45	8
Brentford	1963–64	Third Division	35	11	6	3	4	1	—		45	15
Brentford	1964–65	Third Division	20	3	0	0	1	0	—		21	3
Brentford	1965–66	Third Division	29	7	2	0	2	0	—		33	7
Brentford	Total		146	30	9	0	9	0	—		164	30
Watford	1966–67	Third Division	13	2	0	0	0	0	—		13	2
Career total			196	38	11	0	9	0	1	0	217	38

== Honours ==
Brentford

- Football League Fourth Division: 1962–63
- London Challenge Cup: 1964–65

Individual

- Brentford Supporters' Player of the Year: 1962–63
