= George Summers (footballer) =

Scottish footballer, manager, and coach

Personal information
- Full name: George Summers
- Date of birth: 30 July 1941 (age 85)
- Place of birth: Glasgow, Scotland
- Position: Forward

Youth career
- –1959: Shawfield Juniors

Senior career*
Years	Team	Apps	(Gls)
1959–1965	Brentford	71	(24)
1965–1967	Port Elizabeth City		
1968	Johannesburg Corinthians		

Managerial career
- Hume Park
- * Club domestic league appearances and goals

George Summers (born 30 July 1941) is a Scottish retired professional football forward, manager and coach who played in the Football League for Brentford. He later moved to South Africa.

== Playing career ==
=== Brentford ===
Summers began his career in Glasgow at junior club Shawfield Juniors and moved to England to sign for Third Division South club Brentford in January 1959, who were at the time managed by Scot Malky McDonald. With George Francis and Jim Towers ahead of him in the pecking order up front, Summers initially played for the reserve team. He failed to make a first team appearance during the remainder of the 1958–59 season and failed to receive a call at all during the 1959–60 season. Summers finally made his professional debut, nearly two years after signing, in a 4–3 League Cup second round victory over Sunderland at Griffin Park on 25 October 1960. He made something of a breakthrough into the first team during what remained of the 1960–61 season and made a total of 16 appearances, scoring six goals.

The departures of Towers and Francis during the 1961 off-season (though Francis would soon return) saw a space open up in the Bees' forward line alongside new signing Johnny Brooks and Summers got his chance. He made 35 appearances and scored eight goals during the 1961–62 season, at the end of which the club suffered relegation to the Fourth Division. The acquisition of new forwards Billy McAdams and John Dick pushed Summers back into the reserves for the 1962–63 season, but he still managed six goals in 15 league games and claimed the first silverware of his career, when Brentford returned to the Third Division as Fourth Division champions.

Summers was mostly confined to the reserves during the 1963–64 and 1964–65 and made just 12 first team appearances, though he did enjoy some success with the reserves, by winning the London Challenge Cup in 1965 and scoring in the final versus Chelsea. Not in favour with new manager Tommy Cavanagh, Summers was released towards the end of the 1964–65 season. Despite never breaking into the first team, Summers scored 27 goals in 79 appearances in his six years at Griffin Park, an average of one goal every three games.

=== Port Elizabeth City ===
Summers moved to South Africa to link up with former Brentford teammates Matt Crowe and George McLeod at National Football League club Port Elizabeth City in 1965. He remained with the club for three years and was a part of its most successful period, finishing as National Football League runners-up in 1966 and winning the title in 1967.

=== Johannesburg Corinthians ===
Summers joined fellow National Football League club Johannesburg Corinthians in 1968 and stayed with the club for one season.

== Managerial and coaching career ==
Summers managed South African club Hume Park in the early 1980s and coached the Eastern Province representative team under managers Colin Trader and Daan van der Mescht, helping the club to win the football edition of the Currie Cup in 1981 and 1982.

== Honours ==
Brentford

- Football League Fourth Division: 1962–63
- London Challenge Cup: 1964–65

Port Elizabeth City

- National Football League: 1967

== Career statistics ==
Appearances and goals by club, season and competition
Club	Season	League			FA Cup		League Cup		Total	
Club	Season	Division	Apps	Goals	Apps	Goals	Apps	Goals	Apps	Goals
Brentford	1960–61	Third Division	15	6	0	0	1	0	16	6
Brentford	1961–62	Third Division	30	8	4	2	1	0	35	10
Brentford	1962–63	Fourth Division	15	6	0	0	1	1	16	7
Brentford	1963–64	Third Division	9	2	0	0	1	0	10	2
Brentford	1964–65	Third Division	2	2	0	0	0	0	2	2
Career total			71	24	4	2	4	1	79	27
