= Gordon Henry =

Gordon Henry may refer to:

- Gordon Henry (poet) (born 1955), poet and fiction writer
- Gordon Henry (footballer) (1930–2007), Scottish football centre half
- Gordon Henry (ice hockey) (1926–1972), Canadian ice hockey goaltender
- Gordon Henry (rower) (born 1954), Canadian Olympic rower
