= Tommy Higginson =

Scottish footballer

Personal information
- Full name: Thomas Higginson
- Date of birth: 6 January 1937
- Place of birth: Newtongrange, Scotland
- Date of death: 22 July 2012 (aged 75)
- Place of death: Isleworth, England
- Positions: Left half; inside forward

Youth career
- Edina Hibs
- Penicuik Athletic
- 1956–1959: Kilmarnock

Senior career*
Years	Team	Apps	(Gls)
1959–1970	Brentford	387	(15)
1970–1973	Hillingdon Borough		
- * Club domestic league appearances and goals

Thomas Higginson (6 January 1937 – 22 July 2012) was a Scottish professional footballer who played as a left half and inside forward. He is best remembered for his 12-year spell in the Football League with Brentford, for whom he made 433 appearances and is a member of the club's Hall of Fame.

== Club career ==
=== Kilmarnock ===
Higginson began his career with spells at junior clubs Edina Hibs and Penicuik Athletic. In 1956, Kilmarnock manager Malky McDonald saw Higginson playing in a junior match and invited the youngster to a trial with the Scottish League club. He impressed enough to win a contract, but departed Killie in the summer of 1959 without making an appearance, having missed two years due to his National Service and a ligament injury.

=== Brentford ===
Along with fellow Scot John Docherty, Higginson reunited with manager Malky McDonald at English Third Division club Brentford in June 1959, as cover for forward Jim Towers. He began his time with the club in the reserve team. An inside forward, Higginson made his debut in a league match versus Tranmere Rovers on 27 February 1960. For the following game versus Bournemouth, Higginson replaced club legend Jim Towers in the line-up and the Griffin Park support responded by booing manager Malky McDonald's decision. Despite this beginning, Higginson soon won over the Bees supporters with his performances. Moving back to a left half position, Higginson earned a reputation as a hard man after rugby tackling a Hartlepools United player during a 4–0 victory in October 1962, escaping with only a booking.

Higginson was an ever-present in Brentford's 1962–63 Fourth Division title-winning season. In October 1964, Higginson suffered the ignominy of being the first Brentford player to be sent off since the resumption of football after the Second World War, when he, along with opposition player Eric Brodie, was sent off during a league match versus Shrewsbury Town. The News of the World Football Annual stated that Higginson once passed back to his own goalkeeper from a corner kick. In 1967 and with Brentford in a dire financial situation and the subject of a takeover bid by rivals Queens Park Rangers, Higginson volunteered to take part in a Brentford to Brighton walk, to raise funds for the club. While many volunteers gave up, Higginson walked the whole way. Higginson remained with Brentford until the end of the 1969–70 season and was awarded a testimonial versus Queens Park Rangers in April 1969, earning £1,853 from a 6,620 crowd. He made 433 appearances for the Bees and is fifth on the club's record appearances list. He was posthumously inducted into the Brentford Hall of Fame in December 2016.

=== Hillingdon Borough ===
Higginson ended his career with Southern League Premier Division club Hillingdon Borough and reached the final of the FA Trophy with the club in 1971.

== Sunday League career ==
Higginson played on in Sunday league football during the 1970s, appearing for Thornbury, Syon Villa, Northumberland and Sutton Athletic. He retired from all football in 1990, at age 53.

== Personal life ==
Prior to becoming a footballer, Higginson was a champion youth boxer and athlete in Scotland, taking part in the Border Games and running professionally. While playing junior football, he also worked as a butcher. While undertaking his National Service, Higginson saw active duty with the Royal Scots Regiment in Egypt during the Suez Crisis. While playing for Brentford, Higginson settled in Isleworth. After retiring from professional football in 1970, he worked for Firestone for three years, before returning to his old job of butchering. Higginson died at the age of 75 on 22 July 2012. As a mark of respect, two days later the Brentford players wore black armbands during a pre-season friendly versus FC Erzgebirge Aue. Higginson's funeral was attended by many former Brentford favourites, including Peter Gelson, Alan Hawley and Gordon Phillips.

== Career statistics ==
Appearances and goals by club, season and competition
Club	Season	League			FA Cup		League Cup		Total	
Club	Season	Division	Apps	Goals	Apps	Goals	Apps	Goals	Apps	Goals
Brentford	1959–60	Third Division	2	0	0	0	—		2	0
Brentford	1960–61	Third Division	32	1	2	0	3	0	37	1
Brentford	1961–62	Third Division	46	2	5	1	1	0	52	3
Brentford	1962–63	Fourth Division	46	1	1	0	2	0	49	1
Brentford	1963–64	Third Division	37	1	5	0	1	0	43	1
Brentford	1964–65	Third Division	31	2	3	0	1	0	35	2
Brentford	1965–66	Third Division	30	1	2	0	2	0	34	1
Brentford	1966–67	Fourth Division	43	2	4	0	3	0	50	2
Brentford	1967–68	Fourth Division	42	3	2	0	1	0	45	3
Brentford	1968–69	Fourth Division	39	1	1	0	3	0	43	1
Brentford	1969–70	Fourth Division	40	1	2	0	3	0	45	1
Career total			387	15	27	1	20	0	433	16

== Honours ==
Brentford

- Football League Fourth Division: 1962–63

Individual

- Brentford Hall of Fame
