= Jimmy Gitsham =

English footballer

Personal information
- Full name: James William Gitsham
- Date of birth: 12 May 1942
- Place of birth: Hammersmith, England
- Date of death: 19 January 2005 (aged 62)
- Place of death: Chiltern, England
- Position: Left back

Youth career
- –1959: Brentford

Senior career*
Years	Team	Apps	(Gls)
1959–1963	Brentford	54	(0)
1964–1965	Romford	45	(1)
1966–1968	Stevenage Town	17	(0)
1968–1969	Stevenage Athletic	16	(1)
- * Club domestic league appearances and goals

James William Gitsham (12 May 1942 – 19 January 2005) was an English footballer who played in the Football League for Brentford as a left back.

== Playing career ==
Gitsham began his career in the youth team at Third Division club Brentford and turned professional in July 1959. At age 18, while still a part-time player, Gitsham made his professional debut in a 2–2 draw with Hull City at Griffin Park on 8 April 1961. He went on to establish himself in the left back position, but lost his place in the team to Tom Anthony in September 1962. Gitsham made 61 appearances before departing the Bees during the 1963 off-season. He later played non-League football for Romford, Stevenage Town and Stevenage Athletic and was forced to retire due to a broken ankle.

== Career statistics ==
Appearances and goals by club, season and competition
Club	Season	League			National cup (Note: Includes FA Cup)		League cup (Note: Includes Football League Cup, Southern League Cup, Metropolitan League Cup)		Other		Total	
Club	Season	Division	Apps	Goals	Apps	Goals	Apps	Goals	Apps	Goals	Apps	Goals
Brentford	1960–61	Third Division	4	0	0	0	0	0	―		4	0
Brentford	1961–62	Third Division	34	0	5	0	0	0	―		39	0
Brentford	1962–63	Fourth Division	16	0	0	0	2	0	―		18	0
Brentford	Total		54	0	5	0	2	0	―		61	0
Stevenage Town	1966–67	Southern League First Division	4	0	3	0	2	0	0	0	9	0
Stevenage Town	1967–68	Southern League Premier Division	13	0	1	0	2	0	3 (Note: Appearances in East Anglian Cup)	0	19	0
Stevenage Town	Total		17	0	4	0	4	0	3	0	28	0
Stevenage Athletic	1968–69	Metropolitan League	16	1	―		1	0	6 (Note: 3 appearances in East Anglian Cup, 3 appearances in Metropolitan League Autumn Shield)	0	23	1
Career total			87	1	9	0	7	0	9	0	112	1

== Honours ==
Brentford

- Football League Fourth Division: 1962–63
