= Brian Edgley =

English footballer (1937–2019)

Personal information
- Full name: Brian Kenneth Edgley
- Date of birth: 26 August 1937
- Place of birth: Shrewsbury, England
- Date of death: 18 February 2019 (aged 81)
- Place of death: Victoria, Australia
- Positions: Inside forward; left winger

Youth career
- 1955–1956: Shrewsbury Town

Senior career*
| Years | Team | Apps | (Gls) |
| 1956–1960 | Shrewsbury Town | 113 | (12) |
| 1960–1961 | Cardiff City | 10 | (1) |
| 1961–1962 | Brentford | 31 | (9) |
| 1962–1963 | Barnsley | 4 | (0) |
- Merthyr Tydfil
| 1965–1966 | Caernarfon Town | 18 | (5) |
| 1966 | Arcadia United | 13 | (8) |
| 1966 | Addington | 10 | (6) |
| 1967 | Cape Town City | 6 | (0) |
| 1968 | Hereford United | 0 | (0) |
- GKN Sankey
| 1970 | Ringwood City | | |
| 1971–1972 | Balgownie Rangers | | |
| 1973–1975 | Mooroolbark United | | |

Managerial career
- 1965–1966: Caernarfon Town (player-manager)
- 1970: Ringwood City (player-manager)
- 1971–1972: Balgownie Rangers (player-manager)
- 1973–1975: Mooroolbark United
- 1976: South Melbourne Hellas
- 1976–1977: Doveton
- 1977: Mooroolbark United
- 1978: Frankston City
- 1979: Essendon Croatia
- 1980: Preston Makedonia
- * Club domestic league appearances and goals

Brian Kenneth Edgley (26 August 1937 – 18 February 2019) was an English professional footballer who played as an inside forward in the Football League for Shrewsbury Town, Brentford, Cardiff City and Barnsley. He later played in South Africa and Australia and had a 10-year management career in the latter country.

== Playing career ==
=== Shrewsbury Town ===
Edgley began his career at hometown Third Division South club Shrewsbury Town in 1955. He made his first team debut in January 1956 and signed his first professional contract the following month. Having begun his career as a left winger, the Shrews' relegation to the Fourth Division in 1958 saw Edgley break into the team on a regular basis as an inside forward, making 32 appearances and scoring five goals to help propel the club back into the Third Division with a fourth-place finish in the 1958–59 season. He missed just five league games and scored seven goals during the 1959–60 season as Shrewsbury narrowly missed out on a second successive promotion. Edgley departed the club at the end of the season, having made 113 league appearances and scored 12 goals in five years at Gay Meadow.

=== Cardiff City ===
Edgley moved up to the First Division to sign for Cardiff City in a £6,000 deal prior to the start of the 1960–61 season. He had a forgettable season with the Bluebirds, making just 10 league appearances, but his only goal for the club came with a strike in a memorable 3–0 win over Manchester United at Ninian Park on 26 November 1960. He left the club at the end of the season.

=== Brentford ===
Edgley dropped to back to the Third Division to sign for Brentford in June 1961. He scored 12 goals in 33 games during a disastrous 1961–62 season, in which the Bees were relegated to the Fourth Division. Edgley found it difficult to settle at Griffin Park (having failed to relocate from Cardiff to London) and looking for a quick move away, he signed a month-to-month contract at the start of the 1962–63 season. Now behind new signing John Dick in the pecking order, Edgley made just five appearances before departing in November 1962. He made 45 appearances and scored 13 goals during his time with the Bees.

=== Barnsley ===
Edgley joined Third Division club Barnsley in November 1962, but managed just four league appearances for the Tykes.

=== Non-League football ===
After leaving league football, Edgley returned to Wales and played for non-League clubs Merthyr Tydfil and Caernarfon Town.

=== South Africa ===
In 1966 and 1967, Edgley played in South Africa for National Football League clubs Addington, Arcadia United and Cape Town City.

=== Return to non-League football ===
Edgley returned to England in 1968 and made one appearance for Southern League Premier Division club Hereford United in a Welsh Cup semi-final win over Newport County on 23 March 1968. He also had a spell with West Midlands (Regional) League club GKN Sankey.

=== Australia ===
Edgley moved to Australia in 1970 and played for Ringwood City, Mooroolbark United (for whom he top-scored in the 1973 and 1974 seasons) and Balgownie Rangers.

== Management career ==
=== Caernarfon Town ===
Edgley had a short spell as player-manager of Welsh League (North) club Caernarfon Town between June 1965 and January 1966. After his departure, the Canaries went on to win the 1965–66 division title.

=== Australia ===
Edgley had a 10-year management career in Victorian and New South Wales regional football, managing Ringwood City, Balgownie Rangers, Mooroolbark United (two spells), South Melbourne Hellas, Doveton, Frankston City, Essendon Croatia and Preston Makedonia. He won the Victorian Metropolitan League First Division title with Mooroolbark United in 1973, received the Victoria Soccer Coach of the Year award in 1975 and later managed the club in the inaugural National Soccer League season, finishing bottom and suffering relegation back to the regional leagues. Edgley won a Victorian State League and Cup double with Preston Makedonia in the 1980 season.

== Personal life ==
Edgley attended the Monkmoor Boys' School in Shrewsbury. After his retirement from football, Edgley settled in Melbourne, Australia and became a businessman. After his retirement from business, he and his wife settled on the Mornington Peninsula.

== Honours ==
=== As a player-manager ===
Mooroolbark United

- Victorian Metropolitan League First Division: 1973

=== As a manager ===
Preston Makedonia

- Victorian State League: 1980
- Victorian Cup: 1980

=== As an individual ===
- Victorian Soccer Coach of the Year: 1975

== Career statistics ==
Appearances and goals by club, season and competition
| Club | Season | League | | | FA Cup | | League Cup | | Other | | Total | |
| Club | Season | Division | Apps | Goals | Apps | Goals | Apps | Goals | Apps | Goals | Apps | Goals |
|---|---|---|---|---|---|---|---|---|---|---|---|---|
| Cardiff City | 1960–61 | First Division | 10 | 1 | 0 | 0 | 0 | 0 | — | | 10 | 1 |
| Brentford | 1961–62 | Third Division | 27 | 8 | 5 | 4 | 1 | 0 | — | | 33 | 12 |
| Brentford | 1962–63 | Fourth Division | 4 | 1 | — | | 1 | 1 | — | | 5 | 2 |
| Brentford | Total | | 31 | 9 | 5 | 4 | 2 | 1 | — | | 38 | 14 |
| Hereford United | 1967–68 | Southern League Premier Division | 0 | 0 | — | | — | | 1 (Note: Appearance in Welsh Cup) | 0 | 1 | 0 |
| Career total | | | 41 | 10 | 5 | 4 | 2 | 1 | 1 | 0 | 49 | 15 |
