= 1964–65 Brentford F.C. season =

English football team season

Brentford
1964–65 season
- Chairman: Jack Dunnett
- Manager: Malky MacDonald (until 16 January 1965); Tommy Cavanagh (from 17 January 1965)
- Stadium: Griffin Park
- Third Division: 5th
- FA Cup: Third round
- League Cup: First round
- Top goalscorer: League: Cobb (15); All: Cobb (18)
- Highest home attendance: 30,448
- Lowest home attendance: 5,380
- Average home league attendance: 10,740
Home colours

During the 1964–65 English football season, Brentford competed in the Football League Third Division. Despite topping the table between September and October 1964, the worst away record in the division and a change of managers in January 1965 derailed the club's promotion charge.

== Season summary ==
After a disappointing first season back in the Third Division, Brentford chairman Jack Dunnett allowed manager Malky MacDonald significant funds for new signings. £18,000 was spent on inside forward Jimmy Bloomfield (who returned to Griffin Park after a decade away) and Newport County's journeyman forward Joe Bonson. The team began the season in good form, winning six and drawing one of the first 9 matches to sit atop the Third Division table. The early season goalscoring form of Joe Bonson meant that Billy McAdams, previously a regular scorer for the team, became surplus to requirements and was sold to local rivals Queens Park Rangers for £5,000. While the club established itself in the promotion places, £29,000 was spent on forwards Billy Cobb and Ian Lawther in October and November 1964. As a sign of chairman Dunnett's aim to secure promotion at all costs, a massive £40,000 bid for Torino's Gerry Hitchens was tabled, but was unsuccessful.

Despite a solid home record and regular goals from front players Cobb, Bonson, Lazarus, Lawther and Fielding, a number of away defeats dropped the Bees back into 4th place by January 1965. The FA Cup was exited after a third round replay defeat at the hands of First Division Burnley and a matter of days later, manager Malky MacDonald revealed that he would leave Brentford at the end of the season to return to Kilmarnock. MacDonald intended to see out the remainder of his contract, which expired at the end of the season, but he was immediately placed on gardening leave by chairman Jack Dunnett. Trainer Tommy Cavanagh took over as interim manager. Cavanagh won four and drew two of his first 10 matches, but a 2–0 away defeat to Scunthorpe United on 26 March emphasised the team's poor away record and effectively ended any chances of promotion. Despite the blow, the team reacted positively, winning five and drawing two of the remaining eight matches of the season to secure a 5th-place finish.

Brentford's home record of 18 wins, 4 draws and 1 defeat was the best in the Third Division and promotion may have been attained had the team not lost five consecutive away matches in mid-season. Just one league win away from home equalled the club record. By 19 December 1964, Joe Bonson, Mark Lazarus and Billy Cobb had each reached 10 or more goals for the season, which was the second instance of three Brentford players reaching double-figures before Christmas Day.

The Brentford reserve team had a successful season and won the London Challenge Cup after a 2–1 victory over Chelsea, courtesy of goals from George Summers and Micky Block. In goal was Gerry Cakebread, who had dropped into the reserves for his final season at Griffin Park. Cakebread finished his Brentford career with 374 first team appearances, the most by any goalkeeper for the club.

== League table ==
Pos	Team	Pld	W	D	L	GF	GA	GAv	Pts
3	Mansfield Town	46	24	11	11	95	61	1.557	59
4	Hull City	46	23	12	11	91	57	1.596	58
5	Brentford	46	24	9	13	83	55	1.509	57
6	Bristol Rovers	46	20	15	11	82	58	1.414	55
7	Gillingham	46	23	9	14	70	50	1.400	55

== Results ==
Brentford's goal tally listed first.

=== Legend ===
Win	Draw	Loss

=== Football League Third Division ===
No.	Date	Opponent	Venue	Result	Attendance	Scorer(s)
1	22 August 1964	Luton Town	H	2–2	10,883	Bonson (2)
2	24 August 1964	Mansfield Town	A	1–4	11,326	Fielding
3	28 August 1964	Carlisle United	A	1–0	11,023	Bonson
4	31 August 1964	Mansfield Town	H	1–0	10,592	Lazarus
5	5 September 1964	Port Vale	H	4–0	8,397	Summers, Dick (2, 1 pen), Bonson
6	9 September 1964	Grimsby Town	A	1–2	9,290	Ward
7	12 September 1964	Colchester United	A	3–0	3,977	Fielding (2), Lazarus
8	15 September 1964	Grimsby Town	H	2–0	12,759	Ward, Lazarus
9	19 September 1964	Gillingham	H	2–0	13,075	Fielding, Bonson
10	26 September 1964	Bristol Rovers	H	1–1	14,208	Summers
11	28 September 1964	Peterborough United	A	1–3	13,311	Dick
12	3 October 1964	Oldham Athletic	A	1–1	11,886	Fielding
13	6 October 1964	Peterborough United	H	3–1	12,448	Fielding (2), Cobb
14	9 October 1964	Queens Park Rangers	A	3–1	11,063	Bonson (2), Lazarus
15	14 October 1964	Exeter City	A	0–0	7,500	
16	17 October 1964	Shrewsbury Town	H	2–0	11,372	Fielding, Bonson
17	20 October 1964	Exeter City	H	2–1	12,137	Lazarus, Bloomfield
18	24 October 1964	Reading	A	1–1	12,127	Lazarus
19	27 October 1964	Hull City	H	1–3	12,745	Higginson
20	31 October 1964	Southend United	H	2–1	11,215	Dick, Lazarus
21	7 November 1964	Barnsley	A	1–3	4,067	Bonson
22	21 November 1964	Walsall	A	3–4	8,227	Cobb (2), Bonson
23	28 November 1964	Watford	H	5–1	12,955	Cobb (2), Lazarus (2, 1 pen), Bloomfield
24	12 December 1964	Luton Town	A	2–4	6,014	Lazarus, Lawther
25	19 December 1964	Carlisle United	H	6–1	8,383	Cobb (3), Lawther, Lazarus (2)
26	26 December 1964	Bristol City	H	2–1	16,065	Lawther, Bloomfield
27	2 January 1965	Port Vale	A	1–2	4,533	Lawther
28	16 January 1965	Colchester United	H	1–0	9,049	Gelson
29	23 January 1965	Gillingham	A	0–1	14,474	
30	6 February 1965	Bristol Rovers	A	2–1	14,575	Lawther, Lazarus
31	13 February 1965	Oldham Athletic	H	2–2	10,306	Lazarus, Lawther
32	20 February 1965	Queens Park Rangers	H	5–2	12,398	Higginson, Cobb (3), Bedford (og)
33	27 February 1965	Shrewsbury Town	A	0–1	5,564	
34	2 March 1965	Bristol City	A	2–3	11,152	Cobb, Block (pen)
35	13 March 1965	Southend United	A	1–0	7,815	Lawther
36	17 March 1965	Workington	A	1–1	3,747	Cobb
37	20 March 1965	Barnsley	H	1–0	7,954	Cobb
38	26 March 1965	Scunthorpe United	A	0–2	3,495	
39	3 April 1965	Walsall	H	0–0	7,511	
40	7 April 1965	Workington	H	3–0	6,946	Lawther (2), Cobb
41	10 April 1965	Watford	A	1–1	7,373	Lawther
42	16 April 1965	Bournemouth & Boscombe Athletic	H	2–1	10,519	Fielding (2)
43	17 April 1965	Reading	H	2–1	8,929	Evans (og), Block
44	19 April 1965	Bournemouth & Boscombe Athletic	A	1–0	6,700	Gater (og)
45	24 April 1965	Hull City	A	1–2	14,924	Lawther
46	27 April 1965	Scunthorpe United	H	4–0	6,164	Bonson (2), Block, Bloomfield

=== FA Cup ===
Round	Date	Opponent	Venue	Result	Attendance	Scorer(s)
1R	14 November 1964	Wisbech Town	A	2–0	3,473	Bonson, Cobb
2R	5 December 1964	Notts County	H	4–0	9,400	Bonson, Fielding, Cobb (2)
3R	9 January 1965	Burnley	A	1–1	15,100	Lazarus
3R (replay)	12 January 1965	Burnley	H	0–2	30,448	

=== Football League Cup ===
Round	Date	Opponent	Venue	Result	Attendance
1R	2 September 1964	Southend United	H	0–2	5,380

- Sources: 100 Years Of Brentford, Statto

== Playing squad ==
Players' ages are as of the opening day of the 1964–65 season.

Pos.	Name	Nat.	Date of birth (age)	Signed from	Signed in	Notes
Goalkeepers
GK	Chic Brodie	(Scotland)	22 February 1937 (aged 27)	Northampton Town	1963	
GK	Gordon Phillips	(England)	17 November 1946 (aged 17)	Hayes	1963	
Defenders
DF	Alan Hawley	(England)	7 June 1946 (aged 18)	Youth	1962	
DF	Allan Jones	(Wales)	6 January 1940 (aged 24)	Liverpool	1963	
DF	George Thomson	(Scotland)	19 October 1936 (aged 27)	Everton	1963	
Midfielders
HB	Peter Gelson	(England)	18 October 1941 (aged 22)	Youth	1961	
HB	Tommy Higginson	(Scotland)	6 January 1937 (aged 27)	Kilmarnock	1959	
HB	Hamish MacKenzie	(Scotland)	11 March 1945 (aged 19)	Dunfermline Athletic	1964	
HB	Hugh McLaughlin	(Scotland)	2 September 1943 (aged 20)	St Roch's	1961	
HB	Mel Scott (c)	(England)	26 September 1939 (aged 24)	Chelsea	1963	
HB	Willie Smith	(Scotland)	6 December 1943 (aged 20)	Celtic	1963	
Forwards
FW	Micky Block	(England)	28 January 1940 (aged 24)	Chelsea	1962	
FW	Jimmy Bloomfield	(England)	15 February 1934 (aged 30)	Birmingham City	1964	
FW	Joe Bonson	(England)	9 June 1936 (aged 28)	Newport County	1964	
FW	Billy Cobb	(England)	29 September 1940 (aged 23)	Plymouth Argyle	1964	
FW	John Dick	(Scotland)	19 March 1930 (aged 34)	West Ham United	1962	
FW	John Fielding	(England)	2 September 1939 (aged 24)	Southport	1963	
FW	Ian Lawther	(Northern Ireland)	20 October 1939 (aged 24)	Scunthorpe United	1964	
FW	Mark Lazarus	(England)	5 December 1938 (aged 25)	Queens Park Rangers	1964	
FW	Dai Ward	(Wales)	13 July 1934 (aged 30)	Watford	1963	
Players who left the club mid-season
FW	Billy McAdams	(Northern Ireland)	20 January 1934 (aged 30)	Leeds United	1962	Transferred to Queens Park Rangers
FW	George Summers	(Scotland)	30 July 1941 (aged 23)	Shawfield	1959	Transferred to Port Elizabeth City

- Sources: 100 Years Of Brentford, Timeless Bees

== Coaching staff ==
=== Malky MacDonald (22 August 1964 – 16 January 1965) ===
Name	Role
(Scotland) Malky MacDonald	Manager
(England) Tommy Cavanagh	Trainer

=== Tommy Cavanagh (17 January – 27 April 1965) ===
Name	Role
(England) Tommy Cavanagh	Manager
(Scotland) Jimmy Sirrel	Trainer
(England) Eddie Lyons	Physiotherapist

== Statistics ==
=== Appearances and goals ===

Brentford's highest appearance-makers in each position during the Football League season.

Pos	Nat	Name	League		FA Cup		League Cup		Total	
Pos	Nat	Name	Apps	Goals	Apps	Goals	Apps	Goals	Apps	Goals
GK	(Scotland)	Chic Brodie	45	0	4	0	1	0	50	0
GK	(England)	Gordon Phillips	1	0	0	0	0	0	1	0
DF	(Wales)	Allan Jones	37	0	4	0	1	0	42	0
DF	(England)	Alan Hawley	18	0	1	0	0	0	19	0
DF	(Scotland)	George Thomson	41	0	4	0	1	0	46	0
HB	(England)	Peter Gelson	42	1	4	0	0	0	46	1
HB	(Scotland)	Tommy Higginson	31	2	3	0	1	0	35	2
HB	(Scotland)	Hamish MacKenzie	0	0	0	0	1	0	1	0
HB	(Scotland)	Hugh McLaughlin	2	0	0	0	0	0	2	0
HB	(England)	Mel Scott	46	0	4	0	1	0	51	0
HB	(Scotland)	Willie Smith	7	0	0	0	0	0	7	0
FW	(England)	Micky Block	20	3	0	0	1	0	21	3
FW	(England)	Jimmy Bloomfield	42	4	4	0	1	0	47	4
FW	(England)	Joe Bonson	23	12	4	2	1	0	28	14
FW	(England)	Billy Cobb	35	15	4	3	0	0	39	18
FW	(Scotland)	John Dick	4	4	0	0	0	0	4	4
FW	(England)	John Fielding	38	10	4	1	0	0	42	11
FW	(Northern Ireland)	Ian Lawther	23	11	—		—		23	11
FW	(England)	Mark Lazarus	33	14	4	1	1	0	38	15
FW	(Northern Ireland)	Billy McAdams	2	0	—		0	0	2	0
FW	(Scotland)	George Summers	2	2	0	0	0	0	2	2
FW	(Wales)	Dai Ward	14	2	0	0	1	0	15	2

- Players listed in italics left the club mid-season.
- Source: 100 Years Of Brentford

=== Goalscorers ===
Pos.	Nat	Player	FL3	FAC	FLC	Total
FW	(England)	Billy Cobb	15	3	0	18
FW	(England)	Mark Lazarus	14	1	0	15
FW	(England)	Joe Bonson	12	2	0	14
FW	(Northern Ireland)	Ian Lawther	11	—	—	11
FW	(England)	John Fielding	10	1	0	11
FW	(England)	Jimmy Bloomfield	4	0	0	4
FW	(Scotland)	John Dick	4	0	0	4
FW	(England)	Micky Block	3	0	0	3
HB	(Scotland)	Tommy Higginson	2	0	0	2
FW	(Scotland)	George Summers	2	0	0	2
FW	(Wales)	Dai Ward	2	0	0	2
HB	(England)	Peter Gelson	1	0	0	1
Opponents			3	0	0	3
Total			83	7	0	90

- Players listed in italics left the club mid-season.
- Source: 100 Years Of Brentford

=== Management ===
Name	Nat	From	To	Record All Comps					Record League				
Name	Nat	From	To	P	W	D	L	W %	P	W	D	L	W %
Malky MacDonald	(Scotland)	22 August 1964	16 January 1965	33	17	6	10	51.52	28	15	5	8	53.57
Tommy Cavanagh	(England)	23 January 1965	27 April 1965	18	9	4	5	50.00	18	9	4	5	50.00

=== Summary ===
Games played	51 (46 Third Division, 4 FA Cup, 1 League Cup)
Games won	26 (24 Third Division, 2 FA Cup, 0 League Cup)
Games drawn	10 (9 Third Division, 1 FA Cup, 0 League Cup)
Games lost	15 (13 Third Division, 1 FA Cup, 1 League Cup)
Goals scored	90 (83 Third Division, 7 FA Cup, 0 League Cup)
Goals conceded	60 (55 Third Division, 3 FA Cup, 2 League Cup)
Clean sheets	16 (15 Third Division, 1 FA Cup, 0 League Cup)
Biggest league win	6–1 versus Carlisle United, 19 December 1964
Worst league defeat	4–1 versus Mansfield Town, 24 August 1964
Most appearances	50, Chic Brodie (45 Third Division, 4 FA Cup, 1 League Cup)
Top scorer (league)	15, Billy Cobb
Top scorer (all competitions)	18, Billy Cobb

== Transfers & loans ==
Players transferred in
Date	Pos.	Name	Previous club	Fee	Ref.
June 1964	DF	(England) Jimmy Bloomfield	(England) Birmingham City	£12,000	
June 1964	FW	(England) Joe Bonson	(Wales) Newport County	£6,000	
August 1964	FW	(England) Joe Gadston	(England) West Ham United	n/a	
August 1964	HB	(Scotland) Hamish MacKenzie	(Scotland) Dunfermline Athletic	Free	
October 1964	FW	(England) Billy Cobb	(England) Plymouth Argyle	£12,000	
November 1964	FW	(Northern Ireland) Ian Lawther	(England) Scunthorpe United	£17,000	
1964	HB	(England) Eddie Reeve	n/a	n/a	
1964	FW	(Wales) Phil Basey	n/a	Free	
Players transferred out
Date	Pos.	Name	Subsequent club	Fee	Ref.
22 September 1964	FW	(Northern Ireland) Billy McAdams	(England) Queens Park Rangers	£5,000	
Players released
Date	Pos.	Name	Subsequent club	Join date	Ref.
1965	FW	(Scotland) George Summers	(South Africa) Port Elizabeth City	1965	
April 1965	DF	(England) Tom Anthony	(England) Guildford City	1966	
April 1965	GK	(England) Gerry Cakebread	(England) Hillingdon Borough	1965	
April 1965	FW	(Scotland) John Dick	(England) Gravesend & Northfleet	1965	

== Awards ==
- Evening Standard Player of the Month: Jimmy Bloomfield (October 1964)
