= Tom Anthony =

Tom Anthony may refer to:

- Tom Anthony (footballer) (1943–2021), English footballer
- Tom Anthony (American football) (born 1982), American college football coach
- Tommy Anthony (born 1965), American musician, singer, songwriter, and producer
