= Jimmy Belcher =

English footballer (1932–2023)

Personal information
- Full name: James Alfred Belcher
- Date of birth: 31 October 1932
- Place of birth: Stepney, England
- Date of death: October 2023 (aged 90–91)
- Place of death: Barking, England
- Position: Wing half

Youth career
- Leyton Orient

Senior career*
Years	Team	Apps	(Gls)
1950–1951	Leyton Orient	0	(0)
1951–1952	Snowdown Colliery Welfare		
1952–1954	West Ham United	0	(0)
1954–1958	Crystal Palace	128	(22)
1958–1961	Ipswich Town	27	(0)
1961–1962	Brentford	30	(1)
1962–1963	Margate	0	(0)
Total		185	(23)
- * Club domestic league appearances and goals

James Alfred Belcher (31 October 1932 – October 2023) was an English professional footballer who played as a wing half.

== Career ==
Born in Stepney, Belcher played for Leyton Orient, Snowdown Colliery Welfare, West Ham United, Crystal Palace, Ipswich Town, Brentford and Margate.

== Personal life and death ==
As of November 2013, Belcher lived in Rainham, Kent. He died in Barking, London in October 2023.

== Career statistics ==
Appearances and goals by club, season and competition
Club	Season	League			FA Cup		League Cup		Other		Total	
Club	Season	Division	Apps	Goals	Apps	Goals	Apps	Goals	Apps	Goals	Apps	Goals
Crystal Palace	1954–55	Third Division South	38	12	2	0	—		—		40	12
Crystal Palace	1955–56	Third Division South	36	6	2	0	—		—		38	6
Crystal Palace	1956–57	Third Division South	31	4	4	0	—		—		35	4
Crystal Palace	1957–58	Third Division South	23	0	2	0	—		—		25	0
Crystal Palace	Total		128	22	10	0	—		—		138	22
Ipswich Town	1958–59	Second Division	3	0	2	0	0	0	—		5	0
Ipswich Town	1959–60	Second Division	24	0	0	0	0	0	1 (Note: Appearance in Ipswich Hospital Cup)	0	25	0
Ipswich Town	Total		27	0	2	0	0	0	1	0	30	0
Brentford	1961–62	Third Division	30	1	5	0	1	0	—		36	1
Margate	1962–63	Southern League First Division	0	0	0	0	—		2 (Note: 1 appearance in Southern League Cup, 1 appearance in Kent Floodlight Cup)	0	2	0
Career total			185	23	17	0	1	0	3	0	206	23
