= Alan Hawley (footballer) =

English footballer (1946–2025)

Personal information
- Full name: Alan James Hawley
- Date of birth: 7 June 1946
- Place of birth: Woking, England
- Date of death: 7 October 2025 (aged 79)
- Position: Right-back

Youth career
- 1962: Brentford

Senior career*
Years	Team	Apps	(Gls)
1962–1974	Brentford	317	(4)
1971	→ Fulham (loan)	0	(0)
1974	→ Hillingdon Borough (loan)		
1974	→ Aldershot (loan)	0	(0)
1974–1976	Hillingdon Borough		
1976	Wimbledon	1	(0)
1976–1977	Kingstonian		
1978–1979	Walton & Hersham		
- Ruislip Manor

Managerial career
- 1975–1976: Hillingdon Borough (player-manager)
- * Club domestic league appearances and goals

Alan James Hawley (7 June 1946 – 7 October 2025) was an English professional footballer who played in the Football League as a right-back. He made over 340 appearances for Brentford and was added to the club's Hall of Fame in 2013.

== Playing career ==
=== Brentford ===
Hawley began his career at Fourth Division club Brentford as an apprentice in June 1962, earning £7 a week. When he made his debut at home to Barrow on 29 September 1962 at the age of 16 years, 3 months and 22 days, Hawley was the youngest player to make his debut for Brentford, but he was unable to break into the team on a regular basis. Hawley had to wait until the 1964–65 season to make his breakthrough and won his first piece of silverware, the London Challenge Cup. Either side of a long spell out with a cartilage problem, Hawley was an ever-present during the 1967–68 and 1969–70 seasons.

After a period on the transfer list, the highlight of Hawley's career came during the 1971–72 season, when he helped the club to a third-place finish, which saw the Bees promoted to the Third Division. He succeeded Bobby Ross as captain of the club in 1972, but gradually fell out of favour at Griffin Park and spent time on loan at Hillingdon Borough and Aldershot in 1974. Hawley was awarded a testimonial in May 1974 against Leyton Orient, earning him £1,732. Hawley departed the club at the end of the 1973–74 season, having made 343 appearances and scored four goals for the club. Hawley was added to the Brentford Hall of Fame in 2013, alongside fellow inductees and former teammates Jackie Graham and Bobby Ross.

=== Non-League football ===
After his departure from Brentford, Hawley played on in non-League football for Hillingdon Borough, Wimbledon, Kingstonian, Walton & Hersham and Ruislip Manor.

== Managerial and coaching career ==
Hawley was named as caretaker manager of Southern League Premier Division club Hillingdon Borough in August 1975 and was named player-manager the following month. He remained in the role until his dismissal in November 1976. Hawley returned to Brentford in the early 1990s, working under Joe Gadston in the club's youth system. He also served as a youth coach at Bedgrove Dynamos.

== Personal life and death ==
Hawley was born in Woking on 7 June 1946. He was married with two sons and a daughter. After retiring from football, he taught at the London Oratory School and met his wife, who owned a fish and chip shop. After a period working at Heathrow Airport and at a second fish and chip shop in Earls Court, Hawley began working full-time in the shops. He and his wife took over the running of the Hi-Tide fish and chip shop in Aylesbury in 1997.

Hawley died on 7 October 2025, at the age of 79.

== Career statistics ==
Appearances and goals by club, season and competition
Club	Season	League			FA Cup		League Cup		Total	
Club	Season	Division	Apps	Goals	Apps	Goals	Apps	Goals	Apps	Goals
Brentford	1962–63	Fourth Division	2	0	0	0	0	0	2	0
Brentford	1963–64	Third Division	12	0	0	0	0	0	12	0
Brentford	1964–65	Third Division	18	1	0	0	0	0	19	0
Brentford	1965–66	Third Division	36	0	2	0	2	0	40	0
Brentford	1966–67	Fourth Division	37	0	3	0	3	0	43	0
Brentford	1967–68	Fourth Division	46	2	2	0	1	0	49	2
Brentford	1968–69	Fourth Division	10	1	2	0	0	0	12	1
Brentford	1969–70	Fourth Division	46	1	1	0	3	0	50	1
Brentford	1970–71	Fourth Division	26	0	3	0	1	0	30	0
Brentford	1971–72	Fourth Division	20	0	0	0	0	0	20	0
Brentford	1972–73	Third Division	43	0	0	0	2	0	45	0
Brentford	1973–74	Fourth Division	22	0	0	0	1	0	23	0
Career total			317	4	13	0	13	0	343	4

== Honours ==
Brentford

- Football League Fourth Division third-place promotion: 1971–72
- London Challenge Cup: 1964–65

Individual

- Brentford Hall of Fame

== Sources ==
- Croxford, Mark; Lane, David; Waterman, Greville (2011). The Big Brentford Book of the Eighties. Sunbury-on-Thames, Surrey, UK: Legends Publishing. ISBN 978-1906796716.
