= Ray Reeves =

English footballer

Personal information
- Full name: Raymond Henry Ernest Reeves
- Date of birth: 12 August 1931
- Place of birth: Reading, England
- Date of death: 30 November 2007 (aged 76)
- Place of death: Caversham, England
- Position: Left back

Youth career
- 1947–1952: Reading

Senior career*
Years	Team	Apps	(Gls)
1952–1961	Reading	284	(28)
1961–1962	Brentford	5	(0)
- Dover
- Burton Albion
- Valley Sports

International career
- England Youth
- * Club domestic league appearances and goals

Raymond Henry Ernest Reeves (12 August 1931 – 30 November 2007) was an English professional footballer who played in the Football League for Reading and Brentford as a left back. He holds legend status amongst the Reading supporters and made 317 appearances for the club. He holds the Reading club record for penalties scored, with 22.

== Personal life ==
Reeves had three sons. He began his time with Reading as a groundsman and after his retirement from football, became the Co-op dairy's Southern Regional Manager.

== Career statistics ==
Appearances and goals by club, season and competition
Club	Season	League			FA Cup		League Cup		Total	
Club	Season	Division	Apps	Goals	Apps	Goals	Apps	Goals	Apps	Goals
Brentford	1961–62	Third Division	5	0	0	0	0	0	5	0
Career total			5	0	0	0	0	0	5	0
