= Mel Scott =

English footballer

Personal information
- Full name: Melvyn Douglas Scott
- Date of birth: 26 September 1939
- Place of birth: Claygate, England
- Date of death: August 1997 (aged 57)
- Place of death: Colchester, England
- Position: Centre half

Youth career
- 1955–1956: Chelsea

Senior career*
Years	Team	Apps	(Gls)
1956–1963	Chelsea	97	(0)
1963–1967	Brentford	157	(2)
1967–1968	Oakland Clippers	39	(1)
Total		293	(3)

International career
- England Youth
1958–1960	England U23	4	(0)
- * Club domestic league appearances and goals

Melvyn Douglas Scott (26 September 1939 – August 1997) was an English professional footballer who played as a centre half in the Football League for Brentford and Chelsea. He was capped by England at youth and U23 level.

== Club career ==
=== Chelsea ===
A centre half, Scott began his career in the youth system at Chelsea and signed his first professional contract in November 1956. He broke into the first team squad late in the 1957–58 season and was a regular during 1958–59, making 38 appearances. Over the course of the 1959–60 and 1960–61 seasons, National Service reduced Scott's involvement to just 20 appearances and he came back into the team in 1961–62, making 37 appearances during a disastrous season in which Chelsea were relegated to the Second Division. He departed Stamford Bridge in March 1963, having made 104 appearances during six and a half years as a professional with Chelsea.

=== Brentford ===
Scott dropped down to the Fourth Division to join high-flying Brentford for a £12,500 fee in March 1963. During the remainder of the 1962–63 season he made 17 appearances, scored his first senior goal and won the first silverware of his career when the Bees were crowned Fourth Division champions in May 1963. Over the course of the following three Third Division seasons, Scott would prove to be an indispensable member of the team, making 146 appearances across the half back line, as full back cover and on one occasion as goalkeeper cover, late in a 5–1 victory over Oxford United in February 1966. He was voted the club's 1963–64 Supporters' Player of the Year. Brentford were relegated back to the Fourth Division in May 1966 and Scott lost the captaincy, which he had held since 1964. Despite being transfer-listed by the financially stricken club during 1966–67 season, Scott still experienced some success, with victory in the London Senior Cup. Scott was eventually released mid-season. During his time at Griffin Park, Scott made 177 appearances and scored two goals.

=== Oakland Clippers ===
In 1967, Scott moved to the United States to join National Professional Soccer League club Oakland Clippers. He had a successful first season with the club, winning the Western Division and the league outright after a 4–2 aggregate victory over Baltimore Bays in the 1967 Final. Scott was also voted onto the National Professional Soccer League All-Star Team. The team experienced less joy in the North American Soccer League during its inaugural 1968 season, but Scott's performances were again recognised, with his inclusion in the league's All-Star Team. He departed the club at the end of the 1968 season and finished his two-season spell with 39 appearances and one goal.

== International career ==
Scott was capped by England at youth and U23 level.

== Career statistics ==
Appearances and goals by club, season and competition
Club	Season	League			National Cup		League Cup		Europe		Total	
Club	Season	Division	Apps	Goals	Apps	Goals	Apps	Goals	Apps	Goals	Apps	Goals
Chelsea	1957–58	First Division	9	0	0	0	—		—		9	0
Chelsea	1958–59	First Division	34	0	2	0	—		2 (Note: Appearances in Inter-Cities Fairs Cup)	0	38	0
Chelsea	1959–60	First Division	9	0	2	0	—		—		11	0
Chelsea	1960–61	First Division	9	0	0	0	0	0	—		9	0
Chelsea	1961–62	First Division	36	0	1	0	0	0	—		37	0
Chelsea	Total		97	0	5	0	0	0	2	0	104	0
Brentford	1962–63	Fourth Division	17	1	—		—		—		17	1
Brentford	1963–64	Third Division	44	0	6	0	4	0	—		54	0
Brentford	1964–65	Third Division	46	0	4	0	1	0	—		51	0
Brentford	1965–66	Third Division	38	0	1	0	2	0	—		41	0
Brentford	1966–67	Fourth Division	12	1	0	0	2	0	—		14	1
Brentford	Total		157	2	11	0	9	0	—		177	2
Oakland Clippers	1967	National Professional Soccer League	11	1	—		—		—		11	1
Oakland Clippers	1968	North American Soccer League	28	0	—		—		—		28	0
Oakland Clippers	Total		39	1	—		—		—		39	1
Career total			293	3	16	0	9	0	2	0	320	3

== Honours ==
Brentford

- Football League Fourth Division: 1962–63
- London Challenge Cup: 1966–67

Oakland Clippers

- National Professional Soccer League: 1967
- National Professional Soccer League Western Division: 1967

Individual

- Brentford Supporters' Player of the Year: 1963–64
- National Professional Soccer League All-Star Team: 1967
- North American Soccer League All-Star Team: 1968
