= Bobby Meadows =

English footballer

Personal information
- Full name: Robert Meadows
- Date of birth: 25 April 1938 (age 88)
- Place of birth: Melton Mowbray, England
- Position: Full back

Youth career
- –1955: Stoke City

Senior career*
Years	Team	Apps	(Gls)
1955–1956	Stoke City	0	(0)
–1962	Northwich Victoria		
1962–1964	Doncaster Rovers	43	(0)
- Bangor City
1964–1966	Macclesfield	25	(0)
- Stafford Rangers
- Nantwich
- * Club domestic league appearances and goals

Robert Meadows (born 25 April 1938) is an English retired professional footballer who played in the Football League for Doncaster Rovers as a full back.

== Career statistics ==
Appearances and goals by club, season and competition
Club	Season	League			FA Cup		League Cup		Other		Total	
Club	Season	Division	Apps	Goals	Apps	Goals	Apps	Goals	Apps	Goals	Apps	Goals
Stoke City	1955–56	Second Division	0	0	0	0	—		—		26	0
Doncaster Rovers	1962–63	Fourth Division	26	0	—		—		—		26	0
Doncaster Rovers	1963–64	Fourth Division	17	0	2	0	0	0	—		19	0
Doncaster Rovers	Total		43	0	2	0	0	0	—		45	0
Macclesfield	1964–65	Cheshire League	9	0	0	0	—		0	0	9	0
Macclesfield	1965–66	Cheshire League	16	0	3	0	—		2 (Note: 1 appearance in Cheshire Challenge Cup, 1 appearance in North West Floodlit Cup)	0	21	0
Macclesfield	Total		25	0	3	0	—		2	0	30	0
Career total			68	0	5	0	0	0	2	0	75	0
