= John Fielding (footballer, born 1982) =

English footballer

Personal information
- Full name: John Robert Fielding
- Date of birth: 7 April 1982 (age 44)
- Place of birth: Billingham, England
- Height: 6 ft 0 in (1.83 m)
- Position: Defender

Youth career
- –2001: York City

Senior career*
Years	Team	Apps	(Gls)
2001–2002	York City	9	(1)
2002–????	Harrogate Town		
Total		9	(1)
- * Club domestic league appearances and goals

John Robert Fielding (born 7 April 1982) is an English former professional footballer who played as a defender in the Football League for York City, and in non-League football for Harrogate Town.
