= Joe Gadston =

English footballer and club director (1945–2026)

Personal information
- Full name: Joseph Edward Gadston
- Date of birth: 13 September 1945
- Place of birth: Hanwell, England
- Date of death: January 2026 (aged 80)
- Height: 5 ft 9 in (1.75 m)
- Position: Forward

Youth career
- 1963: West Ham United

Senior career*
Years	Team	Apps	(Gls)
1964–1966	Brentford	0	(0)
1966	Corby Town	12	(6)
1966–1968	Cheltenham Town		
1968–1969	Bristol Rovers	11	(5)
1969–1972	Exeter City	85	(30)
1972–1973	Aldershot	4	(0)
1973	→ Hartlepool (loan)	1	(0)
- Cheltenham Town
1973–1974	Wimbledon	16	(3)
1975–1976	Hillingdon Borough		
1976–1977	Walton & Hersham		
1977–1978	Slough Town		
1978–1979	Hayes		
1979–1980	Ruislip Manor		
1980	Hanwell Town		

Managerial career
- 1979–1980: Ruislip Manor (player-manager)
- 1982–1985: Hanwell Town
- Swanage Town & Herston
- * Club domestic league appearances and goals

Joseph Edward Gadston (13 September 1945 – January 2026) was an English professional footballer who played as a forward in the Football League, most notably for Exeter City. He later became a director of the club.

== Club career ==
Gadston began his career as a youth and amateur player for West Ham United, before moving to Third Division club Brentford, for whom he failed to make a first team appearance and instead played for the reserves. He had a brief spell with Corby Town before joining Southern League club Cheltenham Town for a fee of £22 and 10 shillings. Gadston is cited as one of the greatest players to play for the Robins. Gadston moved back to the Third Division to join Bristol Rovers for a £1,500 fee in 1968 and finally made his professional debut, but he only completed one season with Rovers. His most prolific spell came with Exeter City, whom he joined in November 1969, before moving to Aldershot in July 1972. After a brief loan spell with Hartlepool in February 1973, Gadston dropped back into non-League football with Wimbledon later that year. He played out the remainder of the decade in non-League football.

== Managerial and coaching career ==
Gadston had a spell as player-manager of Ruislip Manor and as manager of Hanwell Town, whom he managed to the 1983–84 London Spartan League Senior Division championship. He subsequently served as general manager of Swanage Town & Herston and later returned to Brentford as Football in the Community Officer.

== Personal life and death ==
Gadston worked as a coach at a sports centre in Southall between 1966 and 1968. He later became a businessman and launched a company to launch and operate Exeter City's St James Park stadium. Gadston also served as a director at Exeter City between 1999 and 2002. He ran a holiday apartment business in Dorset and served the community by running a youth football club and a ping pong tournament for pensioners. Gadston taught sport at Sunninghill Preparatory School in Dorchester until July 2014.

After a long battle with Parkinson's disease, Gadston died in January 2026, at the age of 80.

== Career statistics ==
Appearances and goals by club, season and competition
Club	Season	League			FA Cup		League Cup		Total	
Club	Season	Division	Apps	Goals	Apps	Goals	Apps	Goals	Apps	Goals
Bristol Rovers	1968–69	Third Division	11	5	0	0	1	0	12	5
Hartlepool (loan)	1972–73	Fourth Division	1	0	—		—		1	0
Career total			12	5	0	0	1	0	13	5

== Honours ==
=== Player ===
Brentford Reserves

- London Challenge Cup: 1964–65

=== Manager ===
Hanwell Town

- London Spartan League Senior Division: 1983-84

=== Individual ===
- Cheltenham Town Player of the Year: 1967–68
