= Dick Spiers =

English footballer

Personal information
- Full name: Richard Alan Jesse Spiers
- Date of birth: 27 November 1937
- Place of birth: Benson, England
- Date of death: 22 October 2000 (aged 62)
- Place of death: Bullingdon, England
- Position: Centre half

Senior career*
Years	Team	Apps	(Gls)
- Cholsey United
1955–1970	Reading	453	(3)
- Banbury United
- * Club domestic league appearances and goals

Richard Alan Jesse Spiers (27 November 1937 – 22 October 2000) was an English professional footballer who made over 450 appearances as a centre half in the Football League for Reading. As of December 2012, he is third on Reading's all-time appearances list with 505.

== Honours ==
- Reading Hall of Fame
