= John Fielding (footballer, born 1939) =

English footballer

Personal information
- Full name: John Arnold Fielding
- Date of birth: 2 September 1939
- Place of birth: Liverpool, England
- Date of death: 1 August 2022 (aged 82)
- Place of death: Wigan, England
- Height: 5 ft 6 in (1.68 m)
- Positions: Right winger; right midfielder

Youth career
- 1955–1959: Everton

Senior career*
Years	Team	Apps	(Gls)
1959–1961	Wigan Athletic	19	(8)
1961–1963	Southport	77	(21)
1963–1965	Brentford	82	(18)
1965–1967	Grimsby Town	30	(8)
1967–1968	Port Elizabeth City		
1968–1969	Southport	0	(0)
1969–1970	Wigan Athletic	27	(3)
- Altrincham
- Ellesmere Port Town
- South Liverpool
–1976	Runcorn		
- * Club domestic league appearances and goals

John Arnold Fielding (2 September 1939 – 1 August 2022) was an English professional footballer who played as a winger in the Football League for Brentford, Southport and Grimsby Town. He later had a long career in non-League football and also played in South Africa.

== Playing career ==
=== Early years ===
A right winger or midfielder, Fielding began his career as an amateur at Everton. Following four seasons at Goodison Park, he transferred to Lancashire Combination First Division club Wigan Athletic. A record of nearly a goal every other game between September 1959 and March 1961 earned Fielding a £500 transfer to Football League Fourth Division club Southport. He broke into the team on a regular basis during the 1961–62 season, scoring 13 goals in 48 appearances. He went even better the 1962–63 season, with 11 goals in 32 appearances, before departing the club in March 1963. Fielding scored made 86 appearances and scored 24 goals for Southport.

=== Brentford ===
On 26 March 1963, Fielding transferred to Fourth Division high-flyers Brentford for a £7,000 fee. He had impressed manager Malky McDonald with his performance while a Southport player at Griffin Park in a 3–3 draw earlier in the season. After the return fixture, McDonald tabled a big-money offer. Fielding made seven appearances in what remained of the 1962–63 season to help the Bees over the line to the Division Four championship. He made semi-regular appearances in the Third Division and made 31 appearances, before fully breaking into the team in the 1964–65 season, when he made 42 appearances and scored 10 league goals. After making just 9 appearances in the first half of the 1965–66 season, Fielding left the Bees in December 1965. He made 93 appearances and scored 21 goals during 2 1/2 years at Griffin Park.

=== Grimsby Town ===
Fielding joined Third Division club Grimsby Town in December 1965. Though not a regular pick for the team, he managed eight goals in 31 appearances before departing in 1967.

=== Port Elizabeth City ===
Fielding moved to South Africa in 1967, where he linked up with former Brentford teammate Matt Crowe at National Football League club Port Elizabeth City. He had a successful 1967 season, winning the league championship. Fielding departed the club at the end of the 1968 season.

=== Return to Southport ===
Fielding returned to Third Division club Southport in November 1968 and made a first team appearance in a Lancashire Senior Cup match on 3 January 1969. In February 1969, he departed to join Tranmere Rovers on trial.

=== Return to Wigan Athletic ===
Fielding returned to Wigan Athletic in 1969 for a second spell with the now high-flying Northern Premier League club. He made 49 appearances and scored eight goals during the 1969–70 season and helping the Latics to a second-successive runners-up finish in the league. He departed at the end of the season.

=== Non-League football ===
Fielding wound down his career with spells at Northern Premier League clubs Altrincham, Ellesmere Port Town, South Liverpool and Runcorn. Work commitments led to his retirement from football in 1976.

== Personal life ==
While an amateur with Everton, Fielding served an apprenticeship as a plumber with Arthur Peat.

== Career statistics ==
Appearances and goals by club, season and competition
Club	Season	League			FA Cup		League Cup		Other		Total	
Club	Season	Division	Apps	Goals	Apps	Goals	Apps	Goals	Apps	Goals	Apps	Goals
Southport	1960–61	Fourth Division	9	1	—		—		—		9	1
Southport	1961–62	Fourth Division	41	10	3	1	1	0	3 (Note: 2 appearances and 1 goal in Liverpool Senior Cup, 1 appearance and 1 goal in Lancashire Senior Cup)	2	48	13
Southport	1962–63	Fourth Division	27	10	2	1	3	0	2 (Note: 1 appearance in London Senior Cup, 1 appearance in Lancashire Senior Cup)	0	34	11
Southport	Total		77	21	5	2	4	0	5	2	91	25
Brentford	1962–63	Fourth Division	7	3	—		—		—		7	3
Brentford	1963–64	Third Division	28	4	0	0	3	0	—		31	4
Brentford	1964–65	Third Division	38	10	4	1	0	0	—		42	11
Brentford	1965–66	Third Division	9	1	2	2	0	0	—		11	3
Brentford	Total		82	18	6	3	3	0	—		91	21
Grimsby Town	1965–66	Third Division	30	8	—		1	0	—		31	8
Southport	1968–69	Third Division	0	0	—		—		1 (Note: Appearance in Lancashire Senior Cup)	0	1	0
Southport	Total		77	21	5	2	4	0	6	2	92	25
Career total			189	47	11	5	8	0	6	2	214	54

== Honours ==
Wigan Athletic

- Lancashire FA Challenge Trophy: 1959–60

Port Elizabeth City

- National Football League: 1967
