= Dick Lowrie =

Scottish footballer

Personal information
- Date of birth: 7 July 1943 (age 83)
- Place of birth: Scotland
- Position: Inside forward

Youth career
- –1961: St Roch's
- 1961–1962: Brentford

Senior career*
Years	Team	Apps	(Gls)
1962–1964	Morton	0	(0)
1964–1967	Stenhousemuir	98	(2)
- Petershill
- Cambuslang Rangers
- * Club domestic league appearances and goals

Dick Lowrie (born 7 July 1943) is a Scottish retired amateur footballer who played as an inside forward in the Scottish League for Stenhousemuir.

== Personal life ==
Lowrie worked for the Inland Revenue.

== Honours ==
Cambuslang Rangers

- Scottish Junior Cup: 1970–71, 1971–72
