= Gordon Henry (footballer) =

Scottish footballer

Personal information
- Full name: Gordon Henry
- Date of birth: 9 October 1930
- Place of birth: Troon, Scotland
- Date of death: 23 December 2007 (aged 77)
- Place of death: Aldershot, England
- Positions: Centre half; centre forward

Senior career*
Years	Team	Apps	(Gls)
–1948	Annbank United		
1948–1950	Aberdeen	0	(0)
1950–1951	Annbank United		
1951–1956	St Mirren	19	(4)
1956–1964	Aldershot	175	(15)
- Salisbury
- * Club domestic league appearances and goals

Gordon Henry (9 October 1930 – 23 December 2007) was a Scottish professional footballer who made over 170 appearances as a centre half in the Football League for Aldershot.
