= Tom Anthony (footballer) =

English footballer

Personal information
- Full name: Thomas Henry Anthony
- Date of birth: 16 August 1943
- Place of birth: Hounslow, England
- Date of death: September 2021 (aged 78)
- Place of death: Hounslow, England
- Position: Left back

Youth career
- –1961: Brentford

Senior career*
Years	Team	Apps	(Gls)
1961–1965	Brentford	33	(1)
1966–1971	Guildford City		
- * Club domestic league appearances and goals

Thomas Henry Anthony (16 August 1943 – September 2021) was an English professional footballer who played as a left back in the Football League for Brentford.

== Career ==
=== Brentford ===
A graduate of the Brentford youth team, an injury crisis saw Anthony make his professional debut in a Fourth Division match versus Stockport County on 18 September 1962. He went on to win a regular place in the team and made 35 appearances over the course of the 1962–63 season, which also saw him win a Fourth Division winners' medal. After losing his place to new signing Allan Jones, Anthony managed just one appearance during the 1963–64 season and failed to appear at all during the following campaign. He instead played for the reserves and captained the team to the 1964–65 London Challenge Cup. Anthony departed the Bees at the end of the 1964–65 season, after making 36 appearances and scoring one goal for the club.

=== Guildford City ===
Anthony had trials at Football League clubs Coventry City and Millwall, but failed to win a contract at either club. He dropped into non-League football in 1966 and enjoyed a five-year spell at Southern League club Guildford City, with whom he won the First Division championship in the 1970–71 season. Anthony made over 200 appearances for the club.

== Career statistics ==
Appearances and goals by club, season and competition
Club	Season	League			FA Cup		League Cup		Total	
Club	Season	Division	Apps	Goals	Apps	Goals	Apps	Goals	Apps	Goals
Brentford	1962–63	Fourth Division	33	1	1	0	1	0	35	1
Brentford	1963–64	Third Division	0	0	1	0	0	0	1	0
Career total			33	1	2	0	1	0	36	1

== Honours ==
Brentford

- Football League Fourth Division: 1962–63
- London Challenge Cup: 1964–65

Guildford City

- Southern League First Division: 1970–71
