= Billy McAdams =

Northern Irish footballer and manager

Personal information
- Full name: William John McAdams
- Date of birth: 20 January 1934
- Place of birth: Belfast, Northern Ireland
- Date of death: 13 October 2002 (aged 68)
- Place of death: Barrow-in-Furness, England
- Height: 5 ft 11 in (1.80 m)
- Position: Forward

Senior career*
Years	Team	Apps	(Gls)
- Banbridge Town
- Glenavon
1952	Burnley	0	(0)
1952–53	Distillery		
1953–1960	Manchester City	127	(62)
1960–1961	Bolton Wanderers	44	(26)
1961–1962	Leeds United	11	(3)
1962–1964	Brentford	75	(36)
1964–1966	Queens Park Rangers	33	(11)
1966–1968	Barrow	53	(9)
- Netherfield
Total		343	(147)

International career
1954–1962	Northern Ireland	15	(7)

Managerial career
- 1977: Barrow (joint manager)
- * Club domestic league appearances and goals

William John McAdams (20 January 1934 – 13 October 2002) was a Northern Irish footballer who played in the inside forward position.

== Club career ==
On leaving school at 15, he took an apprenticeship as a heating engineer and played as an amateur. At 17, he went to Burnley for a successful three-month trial but his father would not agree to the terms offered. So he went back to Ireland where he signed professional forms for Distillery (Charles Buchan's Football Monthly, Jan 1967). He then played for Manchester City between 1953 and 1959, making 134 appearances and scoring 66 goals. This was in spite of not kicking a ball for two years because of a back injury which caused him to miss two FA Cup Finals. He scored in 10 consecutive matches between 9 October 1957 and 7 December 1957 (12 goals). He did not score on 14 December 1957 but in his next match on 1 January 1958 he scored a hat-trick. (source www.statcity.co.uk)

He then signed for Bolton Wanderers who hoped he could be successor to Nat Lofthouse. In his first season with the team he scored 18 goals in 27 appearances. Don Revie brought him to Leeds but he only stayed briefly before forming part of an all-International inside forward line at Brentford for the 1962–63 season. Brentford won the 4th Division Championship with McAdams scoring 23 goals in 37 appearances. He then went on to score goals for Queens Park Rangers and Barrow whom he assisted to gain promotion from Division Four at the end of the 1966–67 season, the first of two at Holker Street.

== International ==
He also won 15 caps for Northern Ireland scoring 7 goals in the process. Most memorably, he scored 3 goals in a 1960 World Cup Qualifier against West Germany although Northern Ireland lost the match 4–3. Terry Neill (Revelations of a Football Manager1985), in remembering his own Northern Ireland days, refers to McAdams as one of "'the toothless ones', those players who had a habit of leaving their false teeth lying around... We called him 'Rocky' because of his scarred appearance. Most of his scars came from footballing injuries, but the worst was caused when he leaned forward in his car one day to change the station on his radio and crashed."

== Honours ==
Brentford

- Football League Fourth Division: 1962–63
