= John Dick (footballer, born 1930) =

Scottish footballer

Personal information
- Full name: John Hart Dick
- Date of birth: 19 March 1930
- Place of birth: Govan, Scotland
- Date of death: September 2000 (aged 70)
- Place of death: Chigwell, England
- Position: Inside left

Senior career*
Years	Team	Apps	(Gls)
- Crittall Athletic
1953–1962	West Ham United	326	(153)
1962–1965	Brentford	72	(45)
- Gravesend & Northfleet

International career
1959	Scotland	1	(0)
- * Club domestic league appearances and goals

John Hart Dick (19 March 1930 – September 2000) was a Scottish footballer who played for Crittall Athletic, West Ham United, Brentford, Gravesend & Northfleet and a single appearance for Scotland.

== Career ==
Born in Glasgow, he became a prolific goalscorer and became the first West Ham United player to play for the Scotland national team. He joined West Ham from Crittall Athletic while on national service. Between 1953 and 1962, Dick made 364 appearances for the club, mainly at inside left. He scored 176 goals for West Ham in all competitions, placing him joint third on the club's all-time top scorers list. He eventually moved to Brentford for an incoming record £17,500 transfer fee. He was later in charge of West Ham Juniors. Dick died in September 2000.

== International career ==
Dick made one appearance for Scotland, against England at Wembley Stadium in 1959.

== Career statistics ==
Appearances and goals by club, season and competition
Club	Season	League			FA Cup		League Cup		Other		Total	
Club	Season	Division	Apps	Goals	Apps	Goals	Apps	Goals	Apps	Goals	Apps	Goals
West Ham United	1953–54	Second Division	39	13	3	0	0	0	—		42	13
West Ham United	1954–55	Second Division	39	26	2	0	0	0	—		41	26
West Ham United	1955–56	Second Division	35	8	6	6	0	0	4 (Note: Three appearances and goal in Southern Professional Floodlit Cup and one appearance in Essex Professional Cup)	1	45	15
West Ham United	1956–57	Second Division	36	8	2	1	0	0	3 (Note: Three appearances and 4 goals in Southern Professional Floodlit Cup)	4	41	13
West Ham United	1957–58	Second Division	41	21	3	2	0	0	4 (Note: Three appearances and 3 goals in Southern Professional Floodlit Cup and one appearance in Essex Professional Cup)	3	48	26
West Ham United	1958–59	First Division	41	27	1	0	0	0	3 (Note: Two appearances and two goals in Southern Professional Floodlit Cup and one appearance and goal in Essex Professional Cup)	3	45	30
West Ham United	1959–60	First Division	24	11	1	1	0	0	3 (Note: Two appearances in Southern Professional Floodlit Cup)	0	27	12
West Ham United	1960–61	First Division	34	16	2	1	2	2	—		38	19
West Ham United	1961–62	First Division	35	23	1	0	2	0	—		38	23
West Ham United	1962–63	First Division	2	0	0	0	2	0	—		2	0
West Ham United	Total		326	153	21	11	4	2	16	11	367	177

== Honours ==
Brentford

- Football League Fourth Division: 1962–63
