= 1959–60 Brentford F.C. season =

English football team season

Brentford
1959–60 season
- Chairman: Frank Davis
- Manager: Malky MacDonald
- Stadium: Griffin Park
- Third Division: 6th
- FA Cup: Second round
- Top goalscorer: League: Francis (26); All: Francis (31)
- Highest home attendance: 21,600
- Lowest home attendance: 6,300
- Average home league attendance: 11,912
Home colours

During the 1959–60 English football season, Brentford competed in the Football League Third Division. A strong run in the final 13 matches of the season lifted the Bees from mid-table to a 6th-place finish.

== Season summary ==
After two strong pushes for promotion from the Third Division, Brentford manager Malky MacDonald conducted little transfer business in the 1959 off-season, with his main signing being that of former Chelsea centre half Bill Livingstone as cover for the injured Ian Dargie. Two youngsters MacDonald signed from Scotland during the off-season would go on to make nearly 700 appearances for the club between them – Tommy Higginson and John Docherty. As a testament how little the squad had changed over the previous three years, by the end of the season MacDonald had 12 players on the books who had all made over 100 appearances for Brentford – Cakebread, Wilson, Horne, Coote, Bristow, Goundry, Dargie, Parsons, Heath, Rainford, Francis and Towers.

Despite runs of one defeat in seven matches in August and September 1959 and six wins in seven matches in October, Brentford had uneven first half of the season and were rooted in mid-table at the turn of the year. Jim Towers became the Bees' record Football League goalscorer, courtesy of a hat-trick in a 3–0 defeat of Accrington Stanley on 24 October 1959. He took 19 fewer matches to pass Jack Holliday's record. Towers' strike partner George Francis followed up with a hat-trick in a 4–2 derby victory over rivals Queens Park Rangers and eclipsed that performance with a four-goal haul in a 5–0 FA Cup first round victory over non-League club Ashford Town on 14 November. With the Brentford's so-so league form, the FA Cup looked to be the focus of the season's effort for success, but team met its end in the second round versus Fourth Division club Exeter City.

Brentford welcomed the 1960s with a 2–0 defeat to the eventual-promoted club Southampton at The Dell on 2 January 1960. Mixed form continued until March, when a 1–0 victory over Bournemouth & Boscombe Athletic at the start of the month kicked off a strong run through to the end of the season. In the remaining 13 matches, George Francis and Jim Towers each scored eight goals to elevate Brentford to a 6th-place finish. Francis ended the season as top scorer with 31 goals and it was the second time he had managed to better his fellow "Terrible Twin" Towers' total.

== League table ==
| Pos | Team | Pld | W | D | L | GF | GA | GAv | Pts |
|---|---|---|---|---|---|---|---|---|---|
| 4 | Grimsby Town | 46 | 18 | 16 | 12 | 87 | 70 | 1.243 | 52 |
| 5 | Coventry City | 46 | 21 | 10 | 15 | 78 | 63 | 1.238 | 52 |
| 6 | Brentford | 46 | 21 | 9 | 16 | 78 | 61 | 1.279 | 51 |
| 7 | Bury | 46 | 21 | 9 | 16 | 64 | 51 | 1.255 | 51 |
| 8 | Queens Park Rangers | 46 | 18 | 13 | 15 | 73 | 54 | 1.352 | 49 |

== Results ==
Brentford's goal tally listed first.

=== Legend ===
| Win | Draw | Loss |

=== Football League Third Division ===
| No. | Date | Opponent | Venue | Result | Attendance | Scorer(s) | Notes |
|---|---|---|---|---|---|---|---|
| 1 | 22 August 1959 | Barnsley | A | 2–1 | 7,418 | Francis (2) | |
| 2 | 25 August 1959 | Wrexham | H | 3–1 | 16,970 | Francis, Rainford, Towers (pen) | |
| 3 | 29 August 1959 | Southampton | H | 2–2 | 15,740 | Rainford (2) | |
| 4 | 2 September 1959 | Wrexham | A | 2–3 | 13,112 | Towers, McLeod (pen) | |
| 5 | 5 September 1959 | Reading | A | 3–3 | 13,523 | Francis (2), Heath | |
| 6 | 8 September 1959 | Bury | H | 1–1 | 16,000 | Rainford | |
| 7 | 12 September 1959 | Shrewsbury Town | H | 2–1 | 12,500 | Towers, McLeod | |
| 8 | 15 September 1959 | Bury | A | 0–1 | 13,048 | | |
| 9 | 19 September 1959 | Port Vale | A | 1–3 | 12,817 | Francis | |
| 10 | 22 September 1959 | Halifax Town | H | 1–1 | 15,700 | Francis | |
| 11 | 26 September 1959 | Norwich City | H | 3–4 | 21,600 | Towers (2), Heath | |
| 12 | 28 September 1959 | Halifax Town | A | 0–1 | 7,654 | | |
| 13 | 3 October 1959 | Grimsby Town | A | 3–1 | 11,209 | Francis, Rainford (2) | |
| 14 | 6 October 1959 | Colchester United | H | 2–0 | 14,750 | Francis, Towers | |
| 15 | 10 October 1959 | Tranmere Rovers | H | 2–1 | 11,481 | Rainford, Francis | |
| 16 | 12 October 1959 | Colchester United | A | 1–2 | 7,790 | Francis | |
| 17 | 17 October 1959 | Bournemouth & Boscombe Athletic | A | 2–1 | 12,226 | Towers, Hales | |
| 18 | 24 October 1959 | Accrington Stanley | H | 3–0 | 12,700 | Towers (3) | |
| 19 | 31 October 1959 | Queens Park Rangers | A | 4–2 | 19,430 | Francis (3), Towers | |
| 20 | 21 November 1959 | York City | H | 1–2 | 13,100 | McLeod (pen) | |
| 21 | 28 November 1959 | Coventry City | A | 1–2 | 14,959 | Towers | |
| 22 | 12 December 1959 | Newport County | A | 2–4 | 9,401 | Goundry, Towers | |
| 23 | 19 December 1959 | Barnsley | H | 3–0 | 6,500 | Towers, Francis, Parsons | |
| 24 | 26 December 1959 | Southend United | A | 0–2 | 11,694 | | |
| 25 | 28 December 1959 | Southend United | H | 3–1 | 11,750 | Parsons (pen), Hales, Rainford | |
| 26 | 2 January 1960 | Southampton | A | 0–2 | 16,993 | | |
| 27 | 9 January 1960 | Swindon Town | A | 0–0 | 8,633 | | |
| 28 | 16 January 1960 | Reading | H | 2–2 | 9,200 | Francis, Parsons | |
| 29 | 23 January 1960 | Shrewsbury Town | A | 1–1 | 6,997 | Wallace (og) | |
| 30 | 6 February 1960 | Port Vale | H | 2–0 | 10,100 | Towers, Francis | |
| 31 | 13 February 1960 | Norwich City | A | 1–2 | 22,388 | Francis | |
| 32 | 20 February 1960 | Grimsby Town | H | 0–2 | 10,900 | | |
| 33 | 27 February 1960 | Tranmere Rovers | A | 1–2 | 8,053 | Parsons | |
| 34 | 5 March 1960 | Bournemouth & Boscombe Athletic | H | 1–0 | 9,750 | Francis | |
| 35 | 8 March 1960 | Chesterfield | H | 3–0 | 6,300 | Bristow, McLeod (pen), Towers | |
| 36 | 11 March 1960 | Accrington Stanley | A | 4–3 | 3,500 | Parsons, Towers, Francis (2) | |
| 37 | 19 March 1960 | Coventry City | H | 3–1 | 9,900 | Francis (2), Bristow | |
| 38 | 26 March 1960 | Chesterfield | A | 0–1 | 4,363 | | (Note: The original fixture on 7 November 1959 was abandoned at half time due to fog, with the score at 1–1.) |
| 39 | 2 April 1960 | Swindon Town | H | 2–1 | 8,550 | Towers, Higgins (og) | |
| 40 | 9 April 1960 | York City | A | 1–0 | 4,608 | Towers | |
| 41 | 15 April 1960 | Mansfield Town | H | 1–1 | 9,575 | Francis | |
| 42 | 16 April 1960 | Queens Park Rangers | H | 1–1 | 16,000 | Towers | |
| 43 | 18 April 1960 | Mansfield Town | A | 1–0 | 7,626 | Parsons | |
| 44 | 23 April 1960 | Bradford City | A | 2–0 | 6,509 | Francis, Goundry | |
| 45 | 30 April 1960 | Newport County | H | 1–2 | 7,900 | Towers | |
| 46 | 3 May 1960 | Bradford City | H | 4–0 | 7,200 | Hales, Towers (2), Francis | |

=== FA Cup ===
| Round | Date | Opponent | Venue | Result | Attendance | Scorer(s) |
|---|---|---|---|---|---|---|
| 1R | 14 November 1959 | Ashford Town | H | 5–0 | 13,900 | Francis (4), Towers |
| 2R | 5 December 1959 | Exeter City | A | 1–3 | 10,000 | Francis |

- Sources: 100 Years Of Brentford, Statto

== Playing squad ==
Players' ages are as of the opening day of the 1959–60 season.

| Pos. | Name | Nat. | Date of birth (age) | Signed from | Signed in |
Goalkeepers
| GK | Gerry Cakebread | (England) | 1 April 1936 (aged 23) | Youth | 1954 |
Defenders
| DF | Vernon Avis | (England) | 24 October 1935 (aged 23) | Youth | 1952 |
| DF | Ken Coote | (England) | 19 May 1928 (aged 31) | Wembley | 1949 |
| DF | Ken Horne | (England) | 25 June 1926 (aged 33) | Blackpool | 1950 |
| DF | Tom Wilson (c) | (England) | 3 July 1930 (aged 29) | Fulham | 1957 |
Midfielders
| HB | George Bristow | (England) | 25 June 1933 (aged 26) | Youth | 1950 |
| HB | Ian Dargie | (England) | 3 October 1931 (aged 27) | Tonbridge | 1952 |
| HB | Billy Goundry | (England) | 28 March 1934 (aged 25) | Huddersfield Town | 1955 |
| HB | Bill Livingstone | (Scotland) | 8 February 1929 (aged 30) | Chelsea | 1959 |
| HB | Charlie McInally | (Scotland) | 1 February 1939 (aged 20) | St Roch's | 1958 |
| HB | Ron Peplow | (England) | 4 May 1935 (aged 24) | Southall | 1955 |
| HB | Sid Russell | (England) | 4 October 1937 (aged 21) | Jolly X | 1956 |
Forwards
| FW | George Francis | (England) | 4 February 1934 (aged 25) | Youth | 1955 |
| FW | Johnny Hales | (Scotland) | 15 May 1940 (aged 19) | St Roch's | 1958 |
| FW | Dennis Heath | (England) | 28 September 1934 (aged 24) | Youth | 1954 |
| FW | Tommy Higginson | (Scotland) | 6 January 1937 (aged 22) | Kilmarnock | 1959 |
| FW | George McLeod | (Scotland) | 30 November 1932 (aged 26) | Luton Town | 1958 |
| FW | Eric Parsons | (England) | 9 November 1923 (aged 35) | Chelsea | 1956 |
| FW | Johnny Rainford | (England) | 11 December 1930 (aged 28) | Cardiff City | 1953 |
| FW | Jim Towers | (England) | 15 April 1933 (aged 26) | Youth | 1954 |

- Sources: 100 Years Of Brentford, Timeless Bees

== Coaching staff ==
| Name | Role |
|---|---|
| (Scotland) Malky MacDonald | Manager |
| (England) Fred Monk | Trainer |
| (England) Jack Holliday | Assistant Trainer |

== Statistics ==
=== Appearances and goals ===

Brentford's highest appearance-makers in each position during the Football League season.

| Pos | Nat | Name | League | | FA Cup | | Total | |
| Pos | Nat | Name | Apps | Goals | Apps | Goals | Apps | Goals |
|---|---|---|---|---|---|---|---|---|
| GK | (England) | Gerry Cakebread | 46 | 0 | 2 | 0 | 48 | 0 |
| DF | (England) | Vernon Avis | 11 | 0 | 0 | 0 | 11 | 0 |
| DF | (England) | Ken Coote | 42 | 0 | 2 | 0 | 44 | 0 |
| DF | (England) | Ken Horne | 20 | 0 | 2 | 0 | 22 | 0 |
| DF | (England) | Tom Wilson | 19 | 0 | 0 | 0 | 19 | 0 |
| HB | (England) | George Bristow | 35 | 2 | 2 | 0 | 37 | 2 |
| HB | (England) | Ian Dargie | 20 | 0 | 0 | 0 | 20 | 0 |
| HB | (England) | Billy Goundry | 40 | 2 | 2 | 0 | 42 | 2 |
| HB | (Scotland) | Bill Livingstone | 19 | 0 | 2 | 0 | 21 | 0 |
| HB | (Scotland) | Charlie McInally | 1 | 0 | 0 | 0 | 1 | 0 |
| HB | (England) | Ron Peplow | 8 | 0 | 0 | 0 | 8 | 0 |
| HB | (England) | Sid Russell | 15 | 0 | 0 | 0 | 15 | 0 |
| FW | (England) | George Francis | 46 | 26 | 2 | 5 | 48 | 31 |
| FW | (Scotland) | Johnny Hales | 18 | 3 | 2 | 0 | 20 | 3 |
| FW | (England) | Dennis Heath | 13 | 2 | 0 | 0 | 13 | 2 |
| FW | (Scotland) | Tommy Higginson | 2 | 0 | 0 | 0 | 2 | 0 |
| FW | (Scotland) | George McLeod | 36 | 4 | 1 | 0 | 37 | 4 |
| FW | (England) | Eric Parsons | 25 | 6 | 1 | 0 | 26 | 6 |
| FW | (England) | Johnny Rainford | 46 | 8 | 2 | 0 | 48 | 8 |
| FW | (England) | Jim Towers | 44 | 23 | 2 | 1 | 46 | 24 |

- Players listed in italics left the club mid-season.
- Source: 100 Years Of Brentford

=== Goalscorers ===
| Pos. | Nat | Player | FL3 | FAC | Total |
|---|---|---|---|---|---|
| FW | (England) | George Francis | 26 | 5 | 31 |
| FW | (England) | Jim Towers | 23 | 1 | 24 |
| FW | (England) | Johnny Rainford | 8 | 0 | 8 |
| FW | (England) | Eric Parsons | 6 | 0 | 6 |
| FW | (Scotland) | George McLeod | 4 | 0 | 4 |
| FW | (Scotland) | Johnny Hales | 3 | 0 | 3 |
| HB | (England) | George Bristow | 2 | 0 | 2 |
| HB | (England) | Billy Goundry | 2 | 0 | 2 |
| FW | (England) | Dennis Heath | 2 | 0 | 2 |
| Opponents | | | 2 | 0 | 2 |
| Total | | | 78 | 6 | 84 |

- Players listed in italics left the club mid-season.
- Source: 100 Years Of Brentford

=== Management ===
| Name | Nat | From | To | Record All Comps | | | | | Record League | | | | |
| Name | Nat | From | To | P | W | D | L | W % | P | W | D | L | W % |
|---|---|---|---|---|---|---|---|---|---|---|---|---|---|
| Malky MacDonald | (Scotland) | 22 August 1959 | 3 May 1960 | 48 | 22 | 9 | 17 | 45.83 | 46 | 21 | 9 | 16 | 45.65 |

=== Summary ===
| Games played | 48 (46 Third Division, 2 FA Cup) |
| Games won | 22 (21 Third Division, 1 FA Cup) |
| Games drawn | 9 (9 Third Division, 0 FA Cup) |
| Games lost | 17 (16 Third Division, 1 FA Cup) |
| Goals scored | 84 (78 Third Division, 6 FA Cup) |
| Goals conceded | 64 (61 Third Division, 3 FA Cup) |
| Clean sheets | 12 (11 Third Division, 1 FA Cup) |
| Biggest league win | 4–0 versus Bradford City, 3 May 1960 |
| Worst league defeat | 2–0 on three occasions; 3–1 versus Port Vale, 19 September 1959; 4–2 versus Newport County, 12 December 1959 |
| Most appearances | 48, Gerry Cakebread, George Francis, Johnny Rainford (46 Third Division, 2 FA Cup) |
| Top scorer (league) | 26, George Francis |
| Top scorer (all competitions) | 31, George Francis |

== Transfers and loans ==
Players transferred in
| Date | Pos. | Name | Previous club | Fee | Ref. |
|---|---|---|---|---|---|
| 27 June 1959 | FW | (Scotland) John Docherty | (Scotland) St Roch's | n/a | |
| 11 July 1959 | FW | (Scotland) Tommy Higginson | (Scotland) Kilmarnock | n/a | |
| July 1959 | DF | (England) Jimmy Gitsham | n/a | n/a | |
| July 1959 | HB | (Scotland) Bill Livingstone | (England) Chelsea | Free | |
| August 1959 | GK | (England) Fred Ryecraft | (England) Southall | Free | |
| February 1960 | FW | (Scotland) Danny O'Donnell | (Scotland) Kirkintilloch Rob Roy | n/a | |
Players transferred out
| Date | Pos. | Name | Subsequent club | Fee | Ref. |
| 26 December 1959 | HB | (Scotland) Jimmy Lafferty | (Scotland) St Mirren | n/a | |
Players released
| Date | Pos. | Name | Subsequent club | Join date | Ref. |
| January 1960 | FW | (England) Billy Bloomfield | Retired | | |
| May 1960 | HB | (Scotland) Bill Livingstone | (England) Hastings United | n/a | |
| May 1960 | FW | (Wales) Len Newcombe | (England) Guildford City | n/a | |
