= 1960–61 Brentford F.C. season =

English football team season

Brentford
1960–61 season
- Chairman: Frank Davis
- Manager: Malky MacDonald
- Stadium: Griffin Park
- Third Division: 17th
- FA Cup: First round
- League Cup: Third round
- Top goalscorer: League: Towers (21); All: Towers (22)
- Highest home attendance: 21,000
- Lowest home attendance: 3,500
- Average home league attendance: 7,392
Home colours

During the 1960–61 English football season, Brentford competed in the Football League Third Division. An abundance of draws led to a 17th-place finish and it was the last of seven seasons to feature the "Terrible Twins" strike partnership of Jim Towers and George Francis.

== Season summary ==
Despite making something of a name for themselves as the "nearly men" of the Third Division, manager Malky MacDonald made few changes to the Brentford squad for the fourth-consecutive off-season. The one major change at Brentford was that of the club's traditional red and white-striped shirts, which were passed over in favour of an amber shirt with a blue 'V' neck, due to the number of times the club would be forced to wear its change strip during the season. Negative feedback from the supporters ensured that the change of colours was a one-season experiment.

Brentford started the 1960–61 season well and topped the table after winning the first two matches, but a 6–1 defeat to Watford at Vicarage Road on 30 August 1960 shook the team's confidence. The same XI atoned for that display with a 4–0 victory over Shrewsbury Town four days later, but the view had become prevalent around Griffin Park that some of Brentford's settled XI were past their peak. Manager MacDonald tinkered with his squad and bit-part, reserve or youth players Tommy Higginson, John Docherty, Ron Peplow and Johnny Hales were given runs in the team. Amidst a run of just two wins in 19 league matches, the new Football League Cup gave the Bees some cheer when Second Division club Sunderland were defeated 4–3 at Griffin Park in the club's first-ever match in the competition. The Bees were knocked out after a replay versus reigning Football League champions Burnley in the third round. A first round exit in the FA Cup in November ensured that the Third Division would be Brentford's sole focus for the remainder of the season.

Brentford entered 1961 in 15th place in the Third Division, only three points above the relegation zone. Chairman Frank Davis posted a £7,000 loss, which took the club's debt over £50,000 and a players' strike (in support of their claim for the removal of the maximum wage) was also a real possibility. In a bid to alleviate some of the club's debt, promising outside right John Docherty was sold to Sheffield United for a club record £17,000 in March 1961. The club rallied and lost just five of the remaining 21 matches of the season, but a failure to convert the 11 draws into wins (four consecutive home draws in February and March equalled the club record) ensured that Brentford finished in a lowly 17th place. Brentford's final match of the season versus Reading, although won 2–1, pushed the average league attendance at Griffin Park down to 7,392, which was the club's lowest since the 1924–25 season.

The "Terrible Twins" (forwards Jim Towers and George Francis) had a mixed season, with Towers scoring 22 goals (low by the standards set for himself) and Francis just 10, which led to him being dropped from the team in February 1961 – a decision which would have been considered unthinkable just six months earlier. Despite scoring 13 goals in 10 matches for the reserve team, Francis failed to earn a recall to the first team squad. Francis' replacement, teenager George Summers, scored six goals during the final months of the season.

== League table ==
Pos	Team	Pld	W	D	L	GF	GA	GAv	Pts
15	Coventry City	46	16	12	18	80	83	0.964	44
16	Swindon Town	46	14	15	17	62	55	1.127	43
17	Brentford	46	13	17	16	56	70	0.800	43
18	Reading	46	14	12	20	72	83	0.867	40
19	Bournemouth & Boscombe Athletic	46	15	10	21	58	76	0.763	40

== Results ==
Brentford's goal tally listed first.

=== Legend ===
Win	Draw	Loss

=== Football League Third Division ===
No.	Date	Opponent	Venue	Result	Attendance	Scorer(s)
1	20 August 1960	Tranmere Rovers	H	4–1	10,100	Towers (2), Bristow, Goundry (pen)
2	23 August 1960	Watford	H	2–1	16,500	Heath, Goundry (pen)
3	27 August 1960	Halifax Town	A	0–1	6,048	
4	30 August 1960	Watford	A	1–6	18,065	Chung (og)
5	3 September 1960	Shrewsbury Town	H	4–0	8,900	Francis (3), Towers
6	6 September 1960	Torquay United	H	2–3	8,800	Rainford, Bettany (og)
7	10 September 1960	Walsall	A	0–4	10,864	
8	14 September 1960	Torquay United	A	1–1	5,857	Francis
9	17 September 1960	Bury	H	1–5	8,800	Francis
10	19 September 1960	Queens Park Rangers	A	0–0	12,711	
11	24 September 1960	Chesterfield	A	1–1	5,617	Rainford
12	27 September 1960	Queens Park Rangers	H	2–0	15,000	Rainford, Towers
13	1 October 1960	Southend United	H	1–1	7,700	Rainford
14	3 October 1960	Port Vale	A	2–3	6,843	Towers, Peplow
15	8 October 1960	Bournemouth & Boscombe Athletic	A	1–0	5,791	McLeod
16	15 October 1960	Bradford City	H	2–2	7,300	Towers, Peplow (pen)
17	22 October 1960	Barnsley	A	1–1	7,124	Peplow (pen)
18	29 October 1960	Newport County	H	2–4	7,600	Towers (2)
19	12 November 1960	Grimsby Town	H	0–1	8,100	
20	19 November 1960	Hull City	A	0–3	7,798	
21	2 December 1960	Coventry City	A	0–2	13,589	
22	10 December 1960	Bristol City	H	2–0	5,200	Towers, Francis
23	19 December 1960	Tranmere Rovers	A	0–2	5,584	
24	23 December 1960	Swindon Town	H	2–1	4,480	Higginson, Docherty
25	31 December 1960	Halifax Town	H	2–0	7,000	Francis, Towers
26	7 January 1961	Swindon Town	A	1–1	8,663	Docherty
27	14 January 1961	Shrewsbury Town	A	0–3	6,856	
28	21 January 1961	Walsall	H	3–1	6,250	Francis, Towers (2)
29	28 January 1961	Colchester United	A	4–2	4,040	Rainford, Bristow, Towers (2)
30	4 February 1961	Bury	A	0–1	5,861	
31	11 February 1961	Chesterfield	H	2–2	6,250	Towers (2)
32	18 February 1961	Southend United	A	1–1	7,711	Towers
33	25 February 1961	Coventry City	H	1–1	5,500	Summers
34	4 March 1961	Bradford City	A	1–3	7,500	McLeod
35	11 March 1961	Barnsley	H	0–0	7,000	
36	18 March 1961	Newport County	A	1–0	3,000	Summers
37	25 March 1961	Colchester United	H	0–0	4,800	
38	1 April 1961	Grimsby Town	A	0–0	7,049	
39	3 April 1961	Notts County	H	3–0	5,400	Summers, Towers (2)
40	4 April 1961	Notts County	A	0–0	3,933	
41	8 April 1961	Hull City	H	2–2	6,380	Towers, McLeod
42	14 April 1961	Reading	A	0–4	10,900	
43	22 April 1961	Bournemouth & Boscombe Athletic	H	2–2	4,400	Summers, Towers
44	25 April 1961	Port Vale	H	0–0	3,500	
45	29 April 1961	Bristol City	A	0–3	8,466	
46	2 May 1961	Reading	H	2–1	4,700	Summers (2)

=== FA Cup ===
Round	Date	Opponent	Venue	Result	Attendance	Scorer
1R	5 November 1960	Watford	A	2–2	18,759	Francis (2)
1R (replay)	8 November 1960	Watford	H	0–2	21,000	

=== Football League Cup ===
Round	Date	Opponent	Venue	Result	Attendance	Scorer(s)
2R	25 October 1960	Sunderland	H	4–3	10,400	Towers, McLeod, Rainford
3R	22 November 1960	Burnley	H	1–1	9,900	Rainford
3R (replay)	6 December 1960	Burnley	A	1–2	12,757	Docherty

- Sources: 100 Years Of Brentford, Statto

== Playing squad ==
Players' ages are as of the opening day of the 1960–61 season.

Pos.	Name	Nat.	Date of birth (age)	Signed from	Signed in	Notes
Goalkeepers
GK	Gerry Cakebread	(England)	1 April 1936 (aged 24)	Youth	1954	
Defenders
DF	Vernon Avis	(England)	24 October 1935 (aged 24)	Youth	1952	
DF	Ken Coote (c)	(England)	19 May 1928 (aged 32)	Wembley	1949	
DF	Jimmy Gitsham	(England)	12 May 1942 (aged 18)	Youth	1959	
DF	Tom Wilson	(England)	3 July 1930 (aged 30)	Fulham	1957	
Midfielders
HB	George Bristow	(England)	25 June 1933 (aged 27)	Youth	1950	
HB	Ian Dargie	(England)	3 October 1931 (aged 28)	Tonbridge	1952	
HB	Billy Goundry	(England)	28 March 1934 (aged 26)	Huddersfield Town	1955	
HB	Tommy Higginson	(Scotland)	6 January 1937 (aged 23)	Kilmarnock	1959	
HB	Ron Peplow	(England)	4 May 1935 (aged 25)	Southall	1955	
Forwards
FW	Terry Curran	(England)	29 June 1940 (aged 20)	Tottenham Hotspur	1957	
FW	John Docherty	(Scotland)	29 April 1940 (aged 20)	St Roch's	1959	
FW	George Francis	(England)	4 February 1934 (aged 26)	Youth	1955	
FW	Johnny Hales	(Scotland)	15 May 1940 (aged 20)	St Roch's	1958	
FW	Dennis Heath	(England)	28 September 1934 (aged 25)	Youth	1954	
FW	George McLeod	(Scotland)	30 November 1932 (aged 27)	Luton Town	1958	
FW	Danny O'Donnell	(Scotland)	27 February 1939 (aged 21)	Kirkintilloch Rob Roy	1960	Loaned to Dumbarton
FW	Eric Parsons	(England)	9 November 1923 (aged 36)	Chelsea	1956	
FW	Johnny Rainford	(England)	11 December 1930 (aged 29)	Cardiff City	1953	
FW	George Summers	(Scotland)	30 July 1941 (aged 19)	Shawfield	1959	
FW	Jim Towers	(England)	15 April 1933 (aged 27)	Youth	1954	

- Sources: 100 Years Of Brentford, Timeless Bees

== Coaching staff ==
Name	Role
(Scotland) Malky MacDonald	Manager
(England) Fred Monk	Trainer
(England) Jack Holliday	Assistant Trainer

== Statistics ==
=== Appearances and goals ===

Brentford's highest appearance-makers in each position during the Football League season.

Pos	Nat	Name	League		FA Cup		League Cup		Total	
Pos	Nat	Name	Apps	Goals	Apps	Goals	Apps	Goals	Apps	Goals
GK	(England)	Gerry Cakebread	46	0	2	0	3	0	51	0
DF	(England)	Vernon Avis	6	0	0	0	0	0	6	0
DF	(England)	Ken Coote	41	0	2	0	3	0	46	0
DF	(England)	Jimmy Gitsham	4	0	0	0	0	0	4	0
DF	(England)	Tom Wilson	40	0	2	0	3	0	45	0
HB	(England)	George Bristow	23	2	2	0	1	0	26	2
HB	(England)	Ian Dargie	46	0	2	0	3	0	51	0
HB	(England)	Billy Goundry	23	2	0	0	1	0	24	2
HB	(Scotland)	Tommy Higginson	32	1	2	0	3	0	37	1
HB	(England)	Ron Peplow	17	3	0	0	1	0	18	3
FW	(England)	Terry Curran	5	0	0	0	0	0	5	0
FW	(Scotland)	John Docherty	17	2	0	0	2	1	19	3
FW	(England)	George Francis	31	8	2	2	2	0	35	10
FW	(Scotland)	Johnny Hales	22	0	0	0	0	0	22	0
FW	(England)	Dennis Heath	15	1	0	0	0	0	15	1
FW	(Scotland)	George McLeod	36	3	2	0	3	1	41	4
FW	(Scotland)	Danny O'Donnell	2	0	0	0	0	0	2	0
FW	(England)	Eric Parsons	2	0	2	0	0	0	4	0
FW	(England)	Johnny Rainford	41	5	2	0	3	3	46	8
FW	(Scotland)	George Summers	15	6	0	0	1	0	16	6
FW	(England)	Jim Towers	42	21	2	0	3	1	47	22

- Players listed in italics left the club mid-season.
- Source: 100 Years Of Brentford

=== Goalscorers ===
Pos.	Nat	Player	FL3	FAC	FLC	Total
FW	(England)	Jim Towers	21	0	1	22
FW	(England)	George Francis	8	2	0	10
FW	(England)	Johnny Rainford	5	0	3	8
FW	(Scotland)	George Summers	6	0	0	6
FW	(Scotland)	George McLeod	3	0	1	4
HB	(England)	Ron Peplow	3	0	0	3
FW	(Scotland)	John Docherty	2	0	1	3
HB	(England)	George Bristow	2	0	0	2
HB	(England)	Billy Goundry	2	0	0	2
FW	(England)	Dennis Heath	1	0	0	1
HB	(Scotland)	Tommy Higginson	1	0	0	1
Opponents			2	0	0	2
Total			56	2	6	64

- Players listed in italics left the club mid-season.
- Source: 100 Years Of Brentford

=== Management ===
Name	Nat	From	To	Record All Comps					Record League				
Name	Nat	From	To	P	W	D	L	W %	P	W	D	L	W %
Malky MacDonald	(Scotland)	20 August 1960	2 May 1961	51	14	19	18	27.45	46	13	17	16	28.26

=== Summary ===
Games played	51 (46 Third Division, 2 FA Cup, 3 League Cup)
Games won	14 (13 Third Division, 0 FA Cup, 1 League Cup)
Games drawn	19 (17 Third Division, 1 FA Cup, 1 League Cup)
Games lost	18 (16 Third Division, 1 FA Cup, 1 League Cup)
Goals scored	64 (56 Third Division, 2 FA Cup, 6 League Cup)
Goals conceded	80 (70 Third Division, 4 FA Cup, 6 League Cup)
Clean sheets	13 (13 Third Division, 0 FA Cup, 0 League Cup)
Biggest league win	4–0 versus Shrewsbury Town, 3 September 1960
Worst league defeat	6–1 versus Watford, 30 August 1960
Most appearances	51, Gerry Cakebread, Ian Dargie (46 Third Division, 2 FA Cup, 3 League Cup)
Top scorer (league)	21, Jim Towers
Top scorer (all competitions)	22, Jim Towers

== Transfers & loans ==
Players transferred in
Date	Pos.	Name	Previous club	Fee	Ref.
October 1960	FW	(England) Barry Rowan	(England) Watford	n/a	
Players transferred out
Date	Pos.	Name	Subsequent club	Fee	Ref.
10 September 1960	HB	(Scotland) Charlie McInally	(Scotland) Albion Rovers	n/a	
March 1961	FW	(Scotland) John Docherty	(England) Sheffield United	£17,000	
Players loaned out
Date from	Pos.	Name	To	Date to	Ref.
24 September 1960	FW	(Scotland) Danny O'Donnell	(Scotland) Dumbarton	n/a	
Players released
Date	Pos.	Name	Subsequent club	Join date	Ref.
May 1961	DF	(England) Vernon Avis	(England) Bedford Town	1961	
May 1961	HB	(England) George Bristow	(England) Queens Park Rangers	May 1961	
May 1961	FW	(England) Terry Curran	(England) Kettering Town	1961	
May 1961	HB	(England) Billy Goundry	(England) Bedford Town	1961	
May 1961	FW	(England) Dennis Heath	(England) Bedford Town	1961	
May 1961	DF	(England) Ken Horne	(England) Dover	1961	
May 1961	FW	(England) Eric Parsons	(England) Dover	1961	
May 1961	HB	(England) Ron Peplow	(England) Folkestone Town	1961	
May 1961	FW	(England) Barry Rowan	(England) Dover	1961	
May 1961	HB	(England) Sid Russell	(England) Bexleyheath & Welling	1961	
