= Brentford F.C. Reserves and Academy =

Brentford B
- Nickname: The Bees
- Founded: 2016
- Ground: Wheatsheaf Park, Staines-upon-Thames, Surrey; Jersey Road, Osterley, Middlesex; Brentford Community Stadium, Brentford, Middlesex
- Capacity: 3,002
- Head coach: Sam Saunders
- League: Premier League 2 (competing as Brentford U21)
- Website: http://www.brentfordfc.com
Home colours	Away colours	Third colours

Brentford F.C. Reserves was the reserve team of Brentford. The reserve team played at varying times from 1900 until 2011. During the 2012 off-season, the English reserve football pyramid and youth system was overhauled under the Elite Player Performance Plan and replaced with a new Academy system and development leagues. Brentford's reserve team was relaunched as the Brentford Development Squad in 2011 and in 2012 it began competing in Professional Development League 2 South. After closing the academy in May 2016, the club withdrew from the Elite Player Performance Plan and Professional Development League and launched a new Brentford B team. Following the first team's promotion to the Premier League in 2021, the club reopened its academy in time for the start of the 2022–23 season, under the Elite Player Performance Plan, while retaining the B team.

== Reserve team ==
=== Background ===
Brentford Reserves was formed to give young players and first team players returning from injury game time in a competitive environment. The ever-changing structure of the game in England in the late 19th and early 20th centuries saw the Brentford reserve team included in leagues competing against the first teams of amateur clubs. On occasion, the reserve team would compete in two leagues simultaneously. Upon the Football League's acceptance of the Premier League's Elite Player Performance Plan in 2011, which replaced reserve teams with U21 Development Squads, the reserve team was permanently disbanded. Winger Micky Ball made the most appearances for the reserve team, 159, without having ever made a first team appearance. Two other players made more than 150 reserve team appearances – Fred Ryecraft and Johnny Hales.

==== London League (1900–1914) ====
The reserve team entered the London League First Division in the 1900–01 season and finished 8th out of 11. Following a demotion, the reserves were London League Second Division champions in 1902–03 and earned promotion back to the First Division. They finished third in the First Division in the 1903–04 season and were promoted to the Premier Division for 1904–05, finishing in 8th place. Bottom and second-from-bottom finishes saw the team back in the First Division for the 1908–09 season, which saw the reserves promoted back to the Premier Division as champions. They achieved their highest Premier Division placing in 1909–10, finishing fifth. Mid-table finishes followed in the Premier Division until 1913–14 when, competing for the first time in an all-professional reserve league, Brentford Reserves finished bottom in their final season in the league before the outbreak of the First World War.

==== Great Western Suburban League (1905–1911) ====
The reserve team entered the Great Western Suburban League for the 1905–06 season and finished as champions in 1907–08, 1908–09 and 1910–11 and runners up in 1905–06, 1906–07 and 1909–10. Their main rivals during those years were Reading Reserves, Hounslow and Shepherd's Bush. The 1910–11 title win (in which the team failed to win only two of its games and was unbeaten during the season) forced the league's management to ban professional clubs from competing, which caused Brentford's departure from the league.

==== South Eastern League (1914–1915) ====
Brentford Reserves competed in the South Eastern League during the 1914–15 season, but due to falling attendances brought on by the First World War, the team was withdrawn from the league in January 1915 and its record was expunged.

==== Football Combination (1919–1967, 1998–1999, 2000–2004, 2009–2011) ====
The reserve team spent much of its existence competing in the Football Combination. Brentford Reserves were London Combination (as the Football Combination was known then) champions in 1931–32 and 1932–33. The title-clinching game on 6 May 1933, against Aldershot Reserves was watched by a crowd of over 9,000 at Griffin Park, the club record for a reserve team fixture. A notable achievement was 43-game winning run at Griffin Park between November 1931 and November 1933. Much of the success in those two seasons was down to the prolific goalscoring of Ralph Allen. Overspending and the subsequent cutting of costs forced the club to disband the reserve team and quit the Football Combination in 1967. The reserves re-joined the Football Combination for the 1998–99 season, but withdrew at the end of the 1999–2000 season. The team rejoined for the 2000–01 season and a notable third-place finish was achieved in 2001–02. The reserve team was withdrawn from competition in 2004, but was revived and won election to the Football Combination Central Division in 2009. The team played for two seasons before being replaced by the Brentford Development Squad in 2011. During its final two seasons, the reserve team played its home games at Griffin Park.

==== London Midweek League (1938–1939, 1974–1985) ====
A Brentford reserve team was entered into the London Midweek League for the 1938–39 season. The entry into the league was "to give promising young professionals, amateurs and any “finds” a test and to build up the playing strength". After the Brentford Reserve team was revived in 1974, the team re-entered the London Midweek League. The team's best finish was as runners-up in 1982–83.

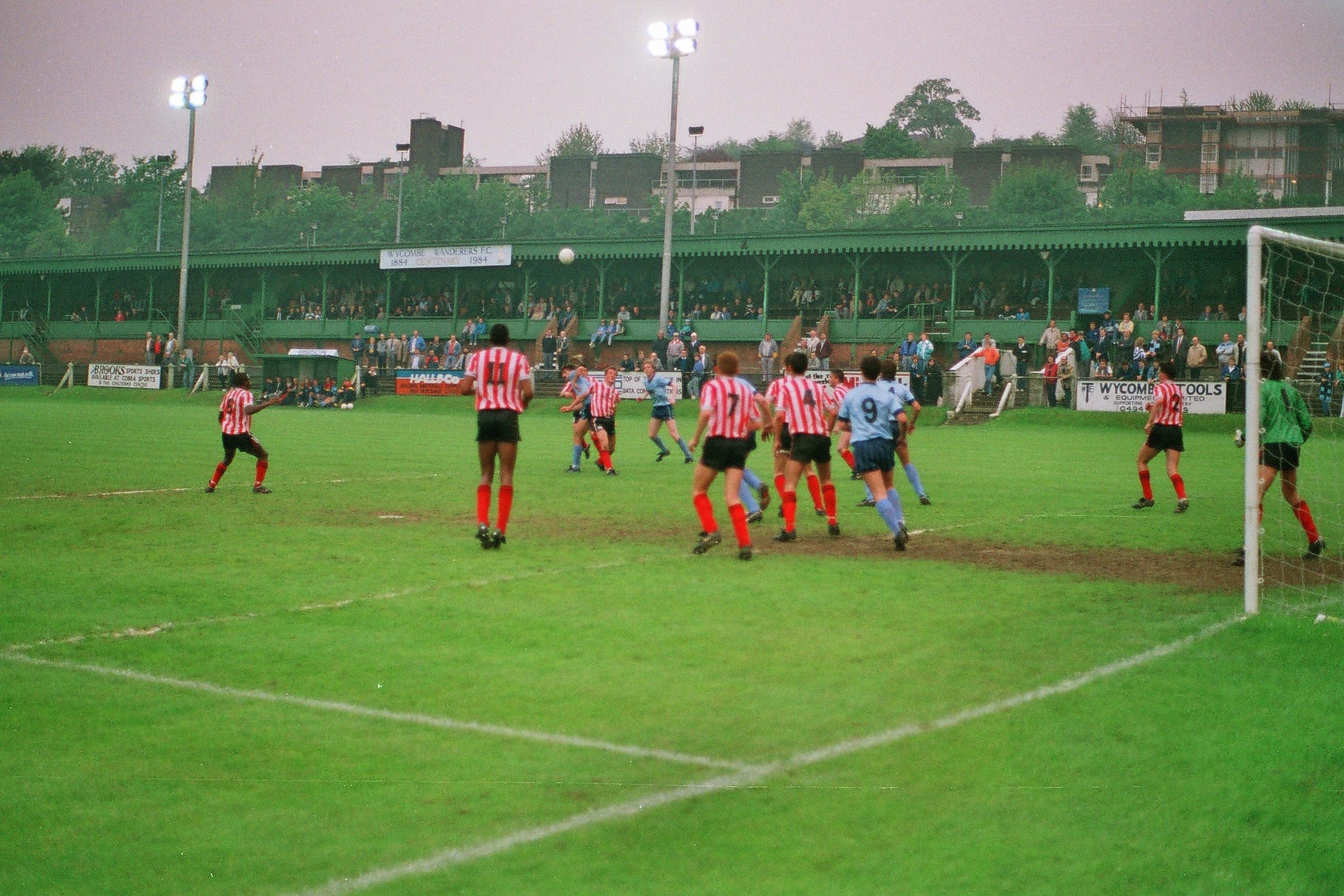
Brentford Reserves defend a Wycombe Wanderers attack during the 1988 Capital League Cup Final. Brentford won the match on penalties.

==== Capital League (1984–1998) ====
A reserve team was entered into the Capital League as founding members in 1984. Throughout its time in the league, the reserve team was competitive and won the title in 1987–88 and 1995–96. The team won the Capital League Cup in 1987–88, 1990–91, 1991–92 and 1994–95.

== Development squad ==
=== Background ===
The Brentford Development Squad was launched in May 2011. The Development Squad played its home matches at the club's training ground at Jersey Road, Osterley and a limited number of fixtures were played at Griffin Park. The team was made up of U21 players and was allowed to field three overage outfield players and one overage goalkeeper, which enabled first team fringe players to get game time. Scholars were also eligible to play for the Development Squad. After impressing during the 2011–12 pre-season, Jake Reeves became the first Development Squad player to be promoted into the first team squad. Charlie Adams, Josh Clarke and Mark Smith also graduated from the team. Josh Clarke made the most competitive appearances for the team during its existence (64) and Jan Holldack, Luke Norris and Jermaine Udumaga tied as top scorers with 14 goals each.

The Development Squad model was abandoned in May 2016. Speaking about the shortcomings of Professional Development League football, then-academy conditioning coach James Purdue stated in October 2020 that "one of the big things for us was that, physically, the players weren’t challenged enough to put them in a place where they were ready to step into first team football. We looked a lot at data from U23 games and it wasn’t comparable to first team football".

=== History (2011–2016) ===
The Development Squad played friendly matches during the 2011–12 season. It won its first silverware in August 2011, with a 3–2 victory over Bedfont Sports claiming the Hounslow Borough Cup. The team entered the Professional U21 Development League 2 South for the 2012–13 season and finished fourth, two places away from qualifying for the knockout stage. The 2013–14, 2014–15 and 2015–16 seasons yielded poor finishes near the bottom of the table. The team entered the Premier League Cup for only time in the 2015–16 season and reached the quarter-finals.

== Brentford B ==
=== Original incarnation (1890s) ===
The original Brentford B team was active during the 1890s and functioned as the third XI, below the first team and reserve team. From the beginning of the 1899–1900 season, the B team was renamed Brentford Thursday.

=== Relaunch (2016–present) ===
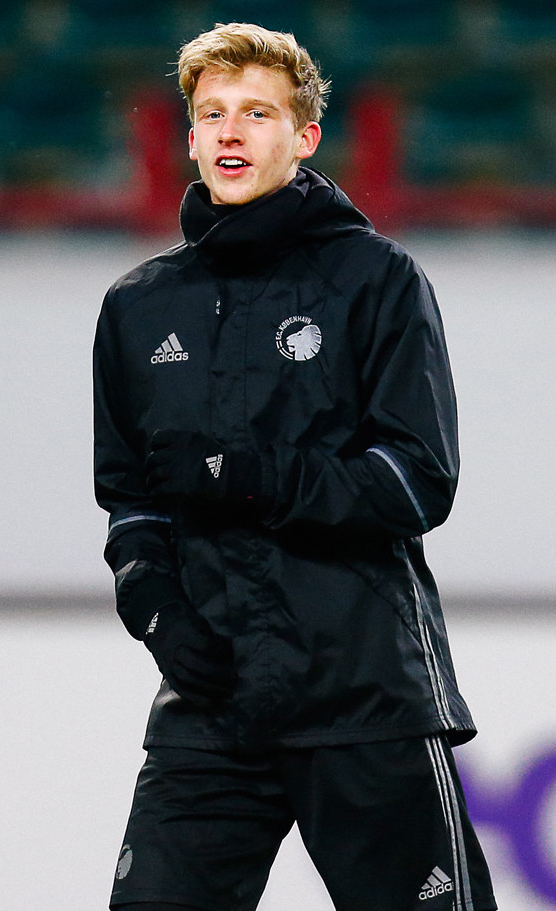
As of October 2026, right back Mads Roerslev has made the most Brentford first team appearances of any B team graduate.

==== Background ====
After the Brentford Academy was closed at the end of the 2015–16 season, the Development Squad was renamed Brentford B. The team plays friendly matches against senior, U23, U21 and academy teams, with a squad of players aged from 17 to 21. In addition, the team plays in friendly cup competitions and entered competitive cups for the first time during the 2018–19 season. The players and staff are part of an ongoing exchange of information with Brentford's partner club FC Midtjylland. Owner Matthew Benham revealed in July 2016 that, with the club needing to focus on the first team and its new stadium, "the B team seemed like a simpler and more attractive option".

Then-Head of Football Operations Robert Rowan stated that the team's initial objective was to promote at least one player into the first team squad by the end of the 2016–17 season, which was achieved when left back Tom Field was promoted in December 2016. By September 2023, 28 B team contracted and loan players had made a first team appearance. As of October 2026, right back David Titov has made the most B team appearances, with 103. In January 2019, Icelandic winger Kolbeinn Finnsson become the first B team player to win a full international cap while contracted to the team. In December 2023, right back Mads Roerslev became the first B team graduate to make 100 first team appearances. In December 2024, the number of first team appearances made by B team graduates passed 500.

Robert Rowan described the recruitment process as being to identify "different leagues where the physical qualities are often overlooked in favour of the tactical qualities, whereas in England if you are physical you have a good chance of being a good player. The tactical side of things can be taught" and that "there isn’t much point in us going to scout young talent in lower league clubs as every Premier League club can out-spend and out-resource us". A 2022 article in The Athletic stated that "Brentford often sign players for their B team who have fallen out of favour or been released from Premier League academies. Non-League sides have proven to be a fertile hunting ground too". Following the reopening of the Brentford academy in July 2022, the club's new U18 team fed into the B team.

Speaking about the benefits of the B team for the players, strength and conditioning coach James Purdue stated in October 2020 that "the games programme tests them more physically and better prepares them for first team football. It’s also treated a lot more like a first team so the environment that they’re used to is not dissimilar when they step up, as we’ve seen with our players over the course of the last four years, the transition becomes easier. It doesn’t mean they’re ready to slot straight in all the time, but it means that they understand the requirements".

==== Home stadiums ====
In October 2023, Brentford took over the use of the vacant Wheatsheaf Park for B team home fixtures. Prior to that, the B team played the majority of its home matches at the club's Jersey Road training ground. Prior to the club moving out of Griffin Park in 2020, the B team played occasional home matches at the ground. The team's first fixture at the Brentford Community Stadium was the 2022–23 Premier League Cup Final, which was won 2–1 over Blackburn Rovers. The grounds of AFC Wimbledon, Hanwell Town, Metropolitan Police, Bedfont Sports, Woking, Stevenage and Sutton United have also been utilised for home fixtures.

==== Matches, leagues, cup competitions and tours ====
Between 2016 and 2024, Brentford B did not play in a league and its fixtures were arranged independently. The team's first fixture took place on 9 July 2016, against UC Santa Barbara Gauchos at Jersey Road, which resulted in a 4–1 victory to the Bees. The team's debut season featured victories over U23 teams from Manchester United, Liverpool (on penalties), West Bromwich Albion, Queens Park Rangers, Reading and Wolverhampton Wanderers. On 27 August 2020, the team played the final match at Griffin Park, a 6–3 London Senior Cup semi-final win over Erith Town. On 23 March 2023, the team played against a senior international XI for the first time and lost 2–0 to Ukraine at Plough Lane. The team, competing as Brentford U21, was entered into the Professional U21 Development League from the 2024–25 season onwards and won the competition at its first attempt. The team won the regular season phase of the competition in 2025–26. As a result of the club being awarded category one academy status in April 2026, the team competed in the Premier League 2 from the beginning of the 2026–27 season.

Since its maiden cup appearance at the Kai Thor Cup in 2017, the team has entered a number of friendly and competitive cup competitions, including the Middlesex Senior Cup, the London Senior Cup, the Korantina Homes Cup, the Atlantic Cup, the Premier League Cup, the EFL Trophy and one-off cup competitions. The team's cup wins include the 2017 Kai Thor Cup, the 2018–19 Middlesex Senior Cup, the 2021–22 London Senior Cup and the 2022–23 Premier League Cup.

Aside from overseas training camps, the team has toured Germany, Italy, Republic of Ireland, Portugal, Cyprus, Spain and the Netherlands.

== Youth team ==
A Brentford youth team won the West Middlesex Junior Cup in 1893–94. A new youth team, named Brentford Town Juniors, was launched in 1948 and won the Hounslow Minor Shield in its inaugural season. Products of the team included Alan Bassham, George Bristow, Roy Hart and George Lowden. The youth team reached the semi-finals of the FA Youth Cup in 1952–53, succumbing 8–1 on aggregate to the eventual winners Manchester United. Under the stewardship of Alf Bew and because of the financial constraints imposed on the first team, the youth team of the early 1950s was particularly productive, yielding Vernon Avis, Johnny Pearson, Gerry Cakebread, Dennis Heath, Jim Towers and George Francis. Following financial problems in 1967, the youth team was disbanded, but was revived again in 1972 with money raised by supporters. The youth team won a youth tournament in Frankfurt the following year, beating Frem in the final, with Richard Poole top-scoring. Along with Poole, Kevin Harding and Roy Cotton progressed to play league football with the first team, while Gary Huxley won England Youth international honours. The youth team ceased playing competitive fixtures at the end of the 1973–74 season.

The youth team was revived for the 1980–81 season. A team containing a young Keith Millen was crowned champions of the South East Counties League in 1983–84. A second FA Youth Cup semi-final was reached in 1988–89, in which Brentford were beaten by Watford. After the dissolution of the South East Counties League, the youths later competed in the Football League Youth Alliance and, competing as an U19 team, they were Merit Division One South champions in 2001–02 and 2002–03. The youths had a memorable run in the FA Youth Cup during the 2005–06 season, beating Arsenal in the third round on penalties after extra time and finally succumbing 2–1 to Newcastle United in the fifth round. The team enjoyed another run in the 2011–12 FA Youth Cup, beating Lewes, Southend United and Hull City before being knocked out in the fourth round by Stoke City.

== Other teams ==
=== A Team (1920s–1930s, 1940s, 1959–1961) ===
A third Brentford team, known as Brentford A, was active in the late 1920s and early 1930s and then again from 1948. The team later competed in the Seanglian League in 1959–60 and finished in mid-table. The As fared worse the following season, finishing second from bottom and was disbanded. The team was managed by former first team goalkeeper Ted Gaskell, with Eddie Lyons as his assistant. Future key players John Docherty, Tommy Higginson and Peter Gelson began their Brentford careers in the team.

=== C Team (1890s) ===
Brentford C functioned as a fourth XI and was active during the 1890s. It later became known as Brentford Old Boys.

=== Elite Development Education Football Programme (2014–present) ===
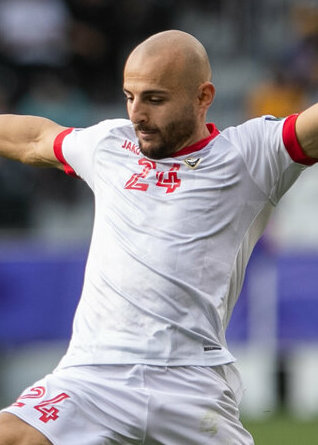
Right back Abdul Rahman Weiss was the first former Brentford Elite Development Education Programme player to be capped at full international level, for Syria later in his career.

The Brentford FC Community Sports Trust, in partnership with West Thames College, runs an Elite Development Education Programme, which sees boys between the ages of 16–18 train with the club three times a week, while also studying for BTEC courses at the college. The course also provides the opportunity for the players to gain FA coaching qualifications. Between 2014 and 2018, two U19 teams, Brentford Griffins and Brentford Bees, participated in the Football Conference Youth Alliance and the National League U19 Alliance and played their home matches at King's House Sports Ground. The teams played their inaugural seasons in 2014–15 and Brentford Griffins won the Football Conference Youth Alliance London & South East division title. Despite the title win, coach Dan Wright revealed that the teams had fallen short of providing new scholars for the academy. Brentford Griffins again finished champions in the 2015–16 season, winning Division F' and advancing to the playoff semi-finals.

From the beginning of the 2016–17 season, the Griffins and Bees became the de facto replacement for the Youth Team, offering a pathway to the B team for local teenage players of the required standard. In 2016, Ellery Balcombe became the first player to graduate from the programme and sign a professional B team contract. He was promoted into the first team squad in 2018 and made his first team debut in 2023. In 2018, Brentford Griffins and Bees were merged to form a single team, Brentford CST Bees, which entered the National League U19 Alliance and finished fourth in Division C.

An additional CST team entered the Community & Education Football Alliance (CEFA) for the 2018–19 season and reached the final of the CEFA Regional Cup. Jason Evans, a player for Brentford CST Bees and the club's CEFA team, was nominated for the CEFA Player of the Year award at the 2019 EFL Awards. The number of CEFA teams was increased to three for the 2019–20 season, under the names Bees, Griffins and Reds. Also in the 2019–20 season, an U19 team was entered into the South Premier Division of the National Youth Football League and the team transferred to the National League U19 Alliance for 2022–23. As of October 2020, former Brentford youth graduate Ryan Peters was running the programme. Following the reopening of the Brentford academy during the 2022 off-season, the U18 academy team fielded the Community Sports Trust's players during the 2022–23 season.

== Centre of Excellence ==
The Brentford Centre of Excellence was formed to nurture youth talent and was headed by Barry Quin, Director Of Youth Football at the club for 20 years. Quin was succeeded in the role by Ose Aibangee in January 2010 and officially left the club in July 2010. During the interim period before academy status was awarded in July 2013, Brentford operated a four-tier youth system – Development Squad (ages 18–21), U18 (ages 16–18), Junior Centre of Excellence (ages 9–15) and Pre-Academy (age 9 and under). The Centre of Excellence ceased to exist in 2013.

== Academy ==
=== Beginnings, planning and function (2010–2016) ===
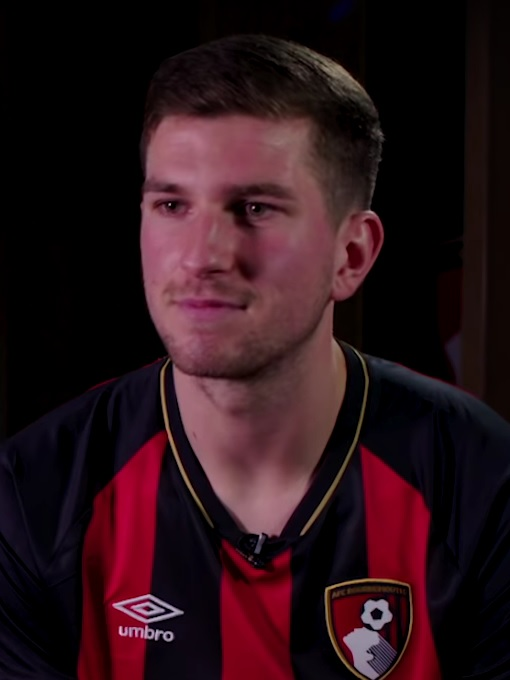
Central defender Chris Mepham was the first former Brentford academy player to be capped at full international level, for Wales.

Plans to upgrade the Centre Of Excellence to an academy began in 2010 after the takeover of the club by Matthew Benham. In December 2012, permission was granted by Hillingdon Council's South and Central Planning Committee for Brentford to build a Category Two Academy on the grounds of Uxbridge High School. The academy facility was paid for by the club, with a contribution from the school. In July 2013, the academy was awarded Category Two status for the next three years. Brentford was the only League One club to make the advance from a Centre Of Excellence to a Category Two Academy.

At the official opening of the academy in January 2014, Ose Aibangee predicted that by 2019, a Brentford academy graduate would be selected for the England national team. In April 2014, after the first team's promotion to the Championship for the 2014–15 season, then-U18 defender Richard Bryan said he believed that the academy could step up to produce players to play at Championship level, saying "for all the players here that want to get into the first team, it is definitely another step up and a harder challenge, but they have got to step up to the plate and be ready for it. There is a hunger in the team and in the coaches".

An indicator of the academy beginning to bear fruit was evidenced by the call ups of Joshua Bohui, Harry Francis and Ross McMahon to England and Scotland youth-level training camps respectively during the 2014–15 season. Julius Fenn-Evans won Wales U16 caps in April 2015, Ian Poveda represented England at U16 level in August 2015 and Joshua Bohui made his England U17 debut in February 2016. In March 2018, central defender Chris Mepham became the first former academy player to be capped at full international level (by Wales) and in January 2019 he transferred away from the club for an undisclosed fee, reported to be £12 million. In March 2022, Crystal Palace left back Tyrick Mitchell became the first former Brentford academy player to be capped by England at full international level.

=== Facility ===
The Brentford Academy was based in an indoor facility on the grounds of Uxbridge High School and became fully operational in November 2013. The academy building contained a 60m x 50m third-generation AstroTurf pitch, learning zones, changing rooms, a gym and a physiotherapy room. The academy was officially opened on 16 January 2014, by FA chairman and former Brentford chairman Greg Dyke.

=== Closure (2016) ===
On 11 May 2016, a statement from co-directors of football Phil Giles and Rasmus Ankersen revealed that prior the beginning of the 2016–17 season, Brentford would withdraw from the Elite Player Performance Plan, the Professional Development League and would no longer run a full academy system between U8 and U21 level. Owner Matthew Benham later revealed the reasons for the closure in an open letter, saying "it is a competitive area, there are lots of academies in London. The risk is you have a great player, but he defects at the age of 16 and you get peanuts in return. In theory the player builds up loyalty to the club, but in practice there are other factors and the parents have an influence. EPPP made it difficult to run an academy, but also there is only so much the club can focus on. Overall, it seems to be difficult for smaller academies to keep hold of players".

A 2017 article in The Guardian stated that "at a cost of around £2m a year, Brentford decided it was simply too much of a risk that their academy – with so much competition on its doorstep in London – would produce enough first team players to make that investment worthwhile". Co-director of football Rasmus Ankersen stated in 2020 that "for every player produced who is good enough for the first team, there are seven or eight who don’t make it. You can accept that if, when that one player comes through in whom you have invested so much, [his sale] can effectively pay for the rest. But when those talents did come through, their scholarships ended at 17, they became free agents and went off and joined Manchester United and Manchester City. We ended up getting something ridiculous, like £30,000, because that’s what they judge their training to have been worth. It’s like having a winning lottery ticket and then someone comes along and steals it".

=== Reopening (2022–present) ===
In December 2021, a public consultation began regarding a new planning application for improved facilities at Brentford's Jersey Road training ground. With the Brentford's promotion to the Premier League in 2021, the club stated that new facilities could be utilised for a "football academy in line with UEFA requirements". With aspirations of the first team playing in European competitions, "UEFA rules stipulate that clubs who wish to take part in its competitions have to operate an academy, otherwise they will be refused entry". Following the preservation of Brentford's Premier League status at the end of the 2021–22 season, it was reported that talks were underway to reopen the academy.

On 15 July 2022, Brentford announced that it had been "granted a licence to open and operate an Academy under the Elite Player Performance Plan" and would "initially open a Category Four Academy for the start of the 2022–23 season". In March 2023, Brentford opened a Development Centre for players between the ages of 9 and 16 and in May 2024, construction began on new academy facilities at the club's Jersey Road training ground. In June 2024, the academy was awarded Category Two status and introduced groups from U9 to U16 level. The club's application to be awarded Category One status was granted in April 2026. As of August 2026, the academy had 70 full-time staff members, with another 30 part-time staff.

=== Teams ===
==== U19 ====
An ad-hoc U19 team is fielded in cup and friendly fixtures. An U19 team was entered into the Middlesex Senior Cup for the 2026–27 season.

==== U18 ====
Under the Elite Player Performance Plan, the Brentford Youth Team was officially renamed as the Brentford U18 team in 2012 (though it continued to be colloquially known as the "youth team") and fielded scholars, U16s and U15s. During its initial four-season existence, the team played in the Professional U18 Development League 2 South. It saw little success, bar the 2014–15 season, in which it qualified for the Professional U18 Development League 2 South knockout stage for the only time. The team progressed to the final of the knockout stage and were defeated 1–0 by Charlton Athletic. 10 second-year scholars graduated from the U18 team to sign professional contracts in April 2015, the generation which had previously won the Junior category at the 2012 Milk Cup while U15s.

In cup competitions, the U18s reached the 2013 Middlesex Senior Youth Cup Final, but were defeated 6–1 by Wealdstone. In December 2014, the team was invited to take part in the prestigious IMG Cup: Boys Invitational at the IMG Academy in Bradenton, Florida and finished the tournament tied in fifth position with United States U17.

The academy was closed at the end of the 2015–16 season and the team ceased to exist, with the majority of the scholars being released or sold. During the team's initial four-year history, the highest appearance-maker was Zain Westbrooke (55) and Bradley Clayton top-scored (20).

In July 2022, the reopening of the Brentford academy saw the creation of a new U18 team and it took part in the EFL Youth Alliance South East Conference, the EFL Youth Alliance Cup and the FA Youth Cup during the 2022–23 and 2023–24 seasons. The team was run in conjunction with the club's Community Sports Trust and fielded its players. From the beginning of the 2023–24 season, the team fielded a new intake of academy scholars and finished the campaign as champions of the EFL Youth Alliance Merit League 2. After the club acquired use of the vacant Wheatsheaf Park in October 2023, the team began playing home matches there. The team re-entered the Professional U18 Development League and cup from the 2024–25 season onwards and was allocated to the South division. The team was entered into the Middlesex Senior Cup for the 2025–26 season. As a result of the club being awarded category one academy status in April 2026, the team competed in the U18 Premier League from the beginning of the 2026–27 season.

==== U17 ====
The U17 team played outside the United Kingdom for the first time when they journeyed to the Netherlands for a friendly match against AZ Alkmaar's Academy on 29 October 2013, with Brentford running out 4–1 winners. The U17s entered the Milk Cup for the first time in 2014 and exited the tournament on penalties to Club América in the Premier Section Globe semi-final. An U17 team, composed of first-year scholars and U16 players, was fielded in the Professional U17 Development League Cup from the 2024–25 season onwards and won the Professional U17 Development League Shield in 2025–26. The team was entered into the Arsenal Academy Cup for the 2025–26 season and finished as runners-up.

==== U16 ====
On 29 October 2014, the U16s took on a Barcelona youth team in a prestigious friendly at La Masia. Brentford took the lead through Danny Parish, but lost 2–1. 12 members of the 2014–15 team signed scholarship deals in April 2015, with Parish being the only member of the group progressing to sign a professional contract. In March 2026, a combined U16 and U15 team won the bronze medal at the 2026 Algarve Elite Cup.

==== U15 ====
Brentford made its Milk Cup debut in 2010 and finished 23rd out of 24 entries. The team had some joy in the competition's Dunluce Trophy, finishing as runners-up to County Down. The U15 team were winners of the Junior category at the 2012 Milk Cup, seeing off CSKA Moscow and Liverpool along the way and beating Everton in the final. The U15s again competed in the Junior category in 2013 Milk Cup and lost 3–2 to a Japan FA team in the Junior Vase final. The team were 2–1 victors over Inter Milan U15 in a friendly played at the Italian club's academy on 17 April 2014. At the 2014 Milk Cup, the U15s won the Junior Globe. The U15s were victorious at the 2015 Sportfan Football Festival in Lithuania, beating Skonto FC in the semi-finals and FM Vilnius in the final.

==== U14 ====
At the time of the resumption of the Brentford youth system in 1970, an U14 team was created and coached by former player Ken Horne.

==== U13 ====
In May 2016, the U13 team won the Elite Neon Cup in Greece, beating AEK Athens in the final.

==== U12 ====
In December 2024, the U12 team competed at the Truce Tournament in Ypres, Belgium and finished fourth.

==== U11 ====
In June 2014, an U11 team entered the 28-team Holstein Cup (held in Bad Oldesloe, Germany) and finished third in the tournament, behind Hertha 03 Zehlendorf and Borussia Mönchengladbach. In late February 2015, Brentford hosted a prestigious England vs Germany U11 tournament, featuring teams from the academies of Arsenal, Liverpool, Manchester United, Tottenham Hotspur, Bayern Munich, Hertha Berlin, Hannover 96 and Schalke 04. Brentford won the Silver Group to finish runners-up in the tournament, behind Manchester United. The U11s took part in the Mediterranean International Cup in April 2015, going out to Valencia in the last 16.

=== Partnerships ===
- Langley Academy
- Southern Soccer Academy Swarm FC
- West Thames College

== Squad lists ==
=== Brentford B ===
#	Name	Nationality	Position	Date of birth (age)	Signed from	Signed in	Contract ends	Notes	International caps (Note: Caps won while contracted to Brentford only.)	Pro.
Goalkeepers
52	Reggie Rose	(England)	GK	26 April 2005 (age 21)	Kinetic Foundation	2023	—			
77	Aidan Stokes	(United States)	GK	14 January 2008 (age 18)	New York Red Bulls II	2026	2027	On loan from New York Red Bulls II		
65	Connor Wolfheimer	(England)	GK	3 March 2007 (age 19)	Academy	2025	2027			
Defenders
—	Val Adedokun	(Republic of Ireland)	LB	14 February 2003 (age 23)	Dundalk	2021	—		(Republic of Ireland) U19	
59	Caelan Avenell (c)	(England)	CB	8 October 2004 (age 22)	Unattached	2024	—			
—	Aidan Golding	(England)	CB / LB	—	Academy	2026	—			
64	Matas Klimas	(Lithuania)	CB / RB	31 July 2007 (age 19)	Academy	2025	2027		(Lithuania) U19	
—	Donal O’Connor	(Republic of Ireland)	CB	19 March 2008 (age 18)	Cork City	2026	2029			
63	Luca Picotto	(Wales)	LB	1 March 2007 (age 19)	Unattached	2025	2027			
71	Archie Trimboli	(Australia)	RB	3 August 2008 (age 18)	Academy	2026	—		(Australia) U20	
66	Joseph Wheeler-Henry	(England)	RB	17 December 2007 (age 18)	Chelsea	2026	—			
Midfielders
68	Luka Bentt	(Belgium)	MF	1 October 2007 (age 19)	Academy	2025	—		(Belgium) U19	
58	Kiefer Gorman	(Sweden)	MF	23 April 2009 (age 17)	Watford	2026	2029		(Sweden) U19	
54	Andre Grey	(England)	DM / CB	24 February 2006 (age 20)	Academy	2024	2027			
—	Darwin Guagua	(Ecuador)	AM	6 November 2007 (age 19)	Independiente del Valle	2026	2031 (+1)	On loan to Mérida		
75	Jacob Hanson	(England)	AM	16 September 2007 (age 19)	Academy	2026	2027			
—	Otis Honor	(England)	MF	7 September 2007 (age 19)	Academy	2026	2027			
—	Ben Krauhaus	(England)	MF	12 October 2004 (age 22)	Bromley	2024	2027 (+1)	On loan to Falkirk		
—	Theo Mawene	(England)	AM	12 July 2007 (age 19)	Preston North End	2025	—			
53	Riley Owen	(England)	CM	24 August 2005 (age 21)	Tottenham Hotspur	2023	2027			
72	Isaiah Powis	(England)	DM / CB	5 November 2007 (age 19)	Academy	2026	—			
—	Sam Sene-Richardson	(England)	MF	3 May 2007 (age 19)	Chatham Town	2026	2028 (+1)			
78	Ben Wilson	(Northern Ireland)	MF	12 August 2008 (age 18)	Glenavon	2026	2028		(Northern Ireland) U19	
Attackers
—	Domeiro Bobb-Semple	(England)	FW / W	4 September 2007 (age 19)	Academy	2026	—			
—	Michel Boni	(Benin)	FW	28 March 2008 (age 18)	Academy	2026	—		(Benin) Full	
74	Naeem Giscombe	(England)	FW / W	—	Academy	2026	2027			
60	Isaac Holland	(England)	RW / RB	2 September 2005 (age 21)	Sheffield Wednesday	2022	2027			
—	Michael Olakigbe	(England)	LW	6 April 2004 (age 22)	Fulham	2022	2028 (+1)	On loan to WSG Tirol	(England) U20	
62	Ollie Shield	(England)	RW / RB	25 September 2006 (age 20)	Academy	2024	—			

=== U18 ===
#	Name	Nationality	Position	Date of birth (age)	Signed from	Signed in	Contract ends	Notes	International caps	Pro.
Goalkeepers
—	Kai Agyei	(England)	GK	26 October 2009 (age 17)	Academy	2026	2028			
—	Felix Lyon	(England)	GK	31 March 2009 (age 17)	Academy	2025	2027			
—	Layton Nicholls	(England)	GK	10 November 2008 (age 18)	Liverpool	2025	2027			
Defenders
—	Harry Biggs	(England)	DF	4 February 2010 (age 16)	Academy	2026	2028			
—	Dylan Danso	(England)	DF	26 April 2010 (age 16)	Academy	2026	2028			
—	Micaiah Fanoiki	(England)	RB	7 June 2009 (age 17)	Academy	2025	2027			
—	Ellis Foster-Jones	(England)	DF	27 December 2009 (age 16)	Academy	2026	2028			
—	Cameron Giles	(England)	DF	26 May 2010 (age 16)	Academy	2026	2028			
—	Amaru Goppy	(England)	DF	24 October 2009 (age 17)	Academy	2026	2028			
—	Reuben Lawal	(England)	LB	10 October 2008 (age 18)	Sheffield United	2025	2027	On loan to Sheffield Wednesday		
—	Nathaniel Ogungbemi	(England)	LB	20 April 2009 (age 17)	Academy	2025	2027			
88	Josh Oladapo-Gamu	(England)	CB	17 November 2008 (age 18)	Academy	2025	2027			
—	Josh Zetter-Plummer	(England)	RB	—	Academy	2025	2027			
Midfielders
—	Ethan Balogun	(England)	MF	10 June 2010 (age 16)	Academy	2026	2028			
—	Jai Bansoodeb	(United States)	AM	15 March 2009 (age 17)	Sutton United	2025	2027		(United States) U17	
—	Chris Cohalan	(England)	CM	31 March 2009 (age 17)	Academy	2025	2027			
—	Andrew Noni	(England)	MF	—	Academy	2026	2028			
—	Beau Redknapp	(England)	CM	10 November 2008 (age 18)	Academy	2025	2027			
—	Enrique Roca	(England)	MF	23 January 2008 (age 18)	Manchester City	2024	2027			
—	Rafael Roca	(England)	MF	5 August 2010 (age 16)	Manchester City	2026	2028			
—	Ibrahim Serme	(England)	MF	1 January 2010 (age 16)	Academy	2026	2028			
Attackers
89	Jovan Kasujja	(England)	FW	4 June 2009 (age 17)	Academy	2025	2027			
—	Mohtady Kuall	(England)	FW	12 February 2010 (age 16)	Crystal Palace	2026	2028			
—	Coran Madden	(Northern Ireland)	FW / W	5 February 2009 (age 17)	Cliftonville	2025	2027		(Northern Ireland) U19	
—	Dwayne Mason	(England)	FW / W	22 April 2010 (age 16)	Academy	2026	2028			
92	Jai Nwosu	(England)	FW	3 January 2010 (age 16)	Academy	2026	2028		(England) U17	
—	Nedved Owusu	(Italy)	W	12 August 2008 (age 18)	Brentford CST	2024	2027			

== Staff ==
=== Current staff ===
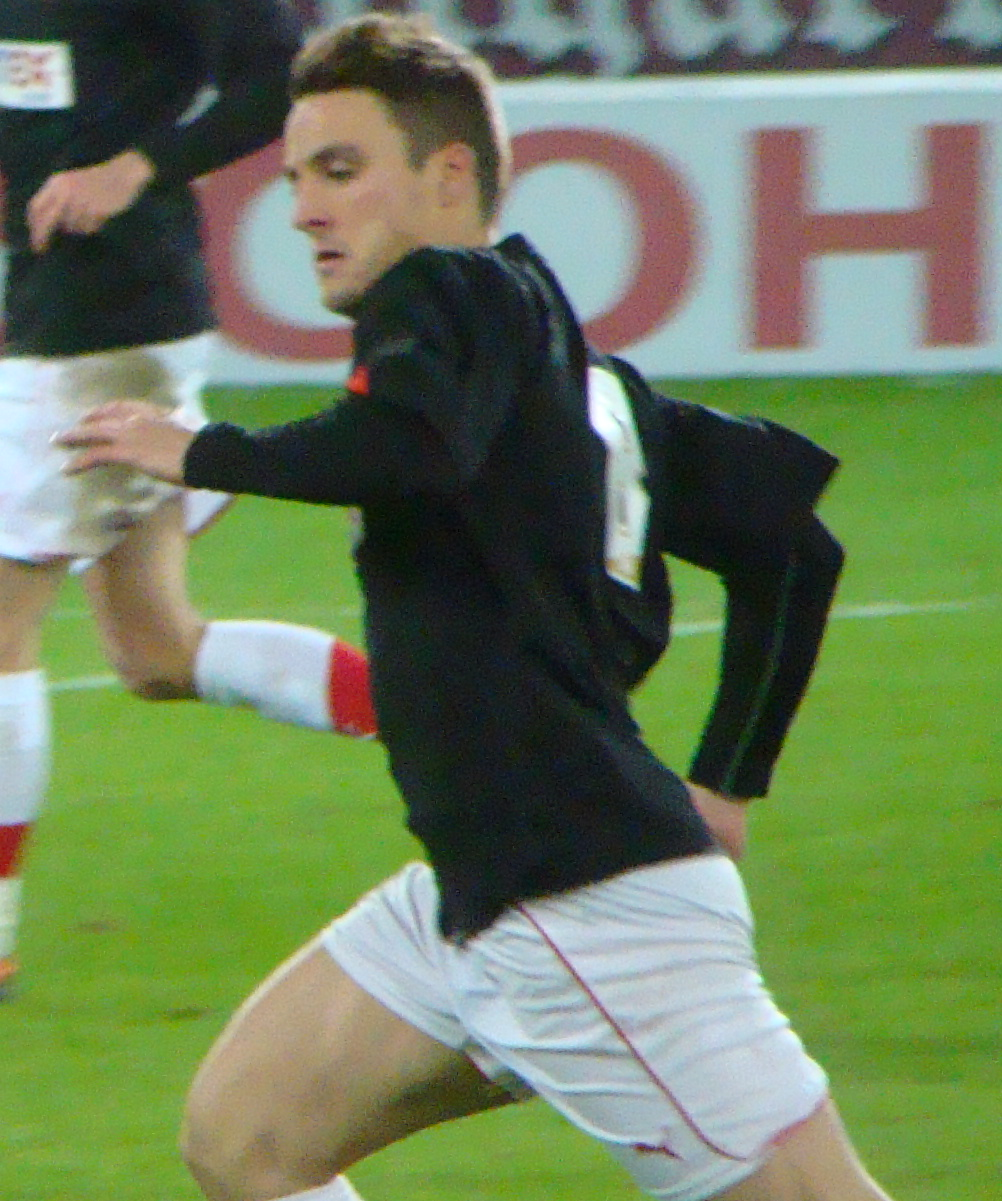
Sam Saunders has served as head coach of Brentford B since July 2025.

Name	Role	Ref.
Sam Saunders	B head coach	
Chris Burke	B assistant coach	
Jani Viander	B goalkeeper coach	
Vacant	B strength and conditioning coach	
Vacant	B physiotherapist	
Cameron Tucker-White	B athletic development coach	
Alex Davis	B human performance coach	
Kieran Swift	B and Academy lead analyst	
Jack Little	B analyst	
Gary McDermott	U18 head coach	
Kieron Driscoll	U18 assistant coach, U17 head coach	
Jon-Paul Pittman	U18 individual development performance coach	
Luca Avena	U18 athletic development coach	
Louis Hutton	U18 physiotherapist	
Kimmy Edwards	U18 performance coach	
Dave Rainford	Academy director	
Jamie Greenwood	Academy head of football development	
Michael Adesida	Academy head of recruitment	
Ryan Peters	Academy head of education, Elite Development Programme coach	
Daniel Hill	Academy head of goalkeeping	
Sam Whitehead	Academy lead athletic development coach	
Declan Gillian	Academy physiotherapist	
Haydée Agras	Academy analyst	
Esme Tuttiett	Academy nutritionist	
Andy Ottley	U15 & U16 head coach	
Josh Brimacombe-Wiard	U15 & U16 assistant coach	
Rob Sweeney	U13 & U14 head coach	
Shane Dunne	U11 & U12 head coach	
Georgie van Dijk	Academy coach	
Michael Hector	Academy coach	
Ryan Nevard	Academy coach	
Adam Bear	Academy scout	
Craig Lopez	Academy scout	
Ben Lampert	Community Sports Trust coach	
Jerome Okimo	Community Sports Trust coach	
Shaun Preddie	Community Sports Trust coach	
Peter Prickett	Community Sports Trust coach	
Tommy Ryan-Maynard	Community Sports Trust coach	
Kristian Wooster	Community Sports Trust coach	
Marco Gianluigi De Lauri	Community Sports Trust goalkeeper coach	
Joe McEachran	Community Sports Trust strength & conditioning coach	
Casey Smyth	Community Sports Trust physiotherapist	
Jamie Tompkins	Community Sports Trust senior manager of football development	

=== Reserve team/Development Squad/B team manager history ===
Name	Nationality	From	To	Ref.
Jackie Goodwin	England	—	—	
Phil Holder	England	—	September 1990	
Graham Pearce	England	—	—	
Kevin Lock	England	May 1993	May 1998	
Roberto Forzoni	England	July 2001	2003	
Adrian Whitbread	England	2004	2006	
Darren Sarll	England	2009	24 May 2011	
Jon de Souza	England	7 July 2011	21 October 2014	
Lee Carsley	Republic of Ireland	21 October 2014	28 September 2015	
Kevin O'Connor	Republic of Ireland	28 September 2015	4 January 2016	
Flemming Pedersen	Denmark	4 January 2016	16 November 2016	
Kevin O'Connor	Republic of Ireland	17 November 2016	12 December 2018	
Lars Friis	Denmark	13 December 2018	29 May 2019	
Neil MacFarlane	Scotland	30 May 2019	3 July 2025	
Sam Saunders	England	3 July 2025	Present	

=== Youth team/U18 manager history ===
Name	Nationality	From	To	Ref.
Alf Bew	England	May 1948	1954	
Ernest Muttitt	England	1955	1957	
Jackie Goodwin	England	1957	1963	
Ian Black	Scotland	—	—	
Roy Ruffell	England	1970	March 1972	
Phil Jarrett	England	March 1972	1972	
Peter Chadwick	England	1972	—	
Len Roe	England	1978	—	
Alan Humphries	England	1980	January 1981	
Dai Jones	Wales	January 1981	1981	
Ron Harris	England	1981	1982	
Brent Hills	England	1982	September 1988	
Colin Lee	England	1988	August 1989	
Tony Gourvish	England	August 1989	—	
Joe Gadston	England	—	May 1993	
Stuart Morgan	Wales	1993	October 1993	
Peter Nicholas	Wales	October 1993	1994	
Bob Booker	England	1994	2000	
Geoff Taylor	England	2000	September 2004	
Barry Quin	England	25 October 2004	2005	
Scott Fitzgerald	Republic of Ireland	June 2005	21 December 2006	
Bobby Paterson	England	January 2007	11 September 2007	
Scott Marshall	Scotland	11 September 2007	2008	
Darren Sarll	England	June 2008	24 May 2011	
Jon de Souza	England	6 July 2011	May 2012	
Louis Lancaster	England	May 2012	16 November 2012	
Jon de Souza	England	16 November 2012	28 November 2012	
Jeremy Steele	England	28 November 2012	7 October 2014	
Jon de Souza	England	October 2014	May 2016	
Eddie Keen	England	2022	1 June 2023	
Lydia Bedford	England	1 June 2023	3 January 2025	
Jon-Paul Pittman (caretaker)	England	4 January 2025	17 May 2025	
Gary McDermott	England	17 May 2025	Present	

== Awards ==
=== B/U21 Team ===
==== Mary Halder Award ====
Season	Name	Nationality	Position	Ref.
2016–17	Chris Mepham	Wales	CB	
2017–18	Marcus Forss	Finland	FW	
2018–19	Ali Coote	Scotland	MF	
2019–20	Nathan Shepperd	Wales	GK	
2020–21	Fin Stevens	Wales	RB	
2021–22	Dom Jefferies	Wales	MF	
2022–23	Ryan Trevitt	England	MF	
2023–24	Ethan Brierley	England	MF	
2024–25	Isaac Holland	England	RW/RB	
2025–26	Ollie Shield	England	RB/RW	

==== Other Player of the Year awards ====
Season	Player of the Year			Players' Player of the Year			Ref.
Season	Name	Nationality	Position	Name	Nationality	Position	Ref.
2016–17	Zain Westbrooke	England	MF	Not awarded			
2017–18	Marcus Forss	Finland	FW	Not awarded			
2018–19	Joe Hardy	England	FW	Not awarded			
2019–20	Jaakko Oksanen	Finland	MF	Not awarded			
2020–21	Aaron Pressley	Scotland	FW	Not awarded			
2021–22	Nathan Young-Coombes	England	FW	Not awarded			
2022–23	Alex Gilbert	Republic of Ireland	LW	Not awarded			
2023–24	Val Adedokun	Republic of Ireland	LB	Ethan Brierley	England	MF	
2024–25	Benjamin Arthur	England	CB	Benjamin Fredrick	Nigeria	CB	
2025–26	Josh Stephenson	England	CB	Ethan Laidlaw	Scotland	FW	

=== Youth Team/U18 Player of the Year ===
Season	Name	Nationality	Position	Ref.
1994–95	Matt Flitter	Wales	DF	
1996–97	Ryan Denys	England	RW/FW	
2012–13	George Pilbeam	England	RB	
2013–14	Gradi Milenge	England	CB	
2014–15	Nik Tzanev	New Zealand	GK	
2015–16	Chris Mepham	Wales	CB	
2023–24	Ollie Shield	England	RB/RW	
2024–25	Otis Honor	England	MF	
2025–26	Beau Redknapp	England	CM	

=== Other awards ===
- Brentford Premier League Scholar of the Year: Luka Bentt (2025–26)
- Premier League 2 Player of the Month: Kaye Furo (August 2026)

== Honours ==
=== Reserve Team/Development Squad/B/U21 Honours ===
==== Leagues ====
Capital League

- 1987–88, 1994–95

Great Western Suburban League

- 1907–08, 1908–09, 1910–11

London Combination

- 1931–32, 1932–33

London League

- First Division:1908–09
- Second Division: 1902–03

Professional U21 Development League

- League phase
  - 2025–26
- Playoff phase
  - National Final: 2024–25

==== Cups ====
Capital League Cup

- 1987–88, 1990–91, 1991–92, 1994–95

Hounslow Borough Cup

- 2011

Kai Thor Cup

- 2017

Middlesex Senior Cup

- 2018–19

London Senior Cup

- 2021–22

Premier League Cup

- 2022–23

=== Youth Team/U18 Honours ===
==== Leagues ====
English Football League Youth Alliance

- First Division South: 2001–02, 2002–03
- Merit League 2: 2023–24

South East Counties League

- 1983–84

==== Cups ====
Hounslow Minor Shield

- 1948–49

Chertsey Minor Cup

- 1949–50

Frankfurt International Youth Tournament

- 1973

West Middlesex Junior Cup

- 1893–94

Royal Mail Cup

- 1996, 1998

=== Academy Team Honours ===
==== U17 ====
Professional U17 Development League Shield

- 2025–26

==== U15 ====
Milk Cup: 2

- 2012 (Junior)
- 2014 (Junior Globe)

Sportfan Football Festival

- 2015

==== U13 ====
Elite Neon Cup

- 2015

==== U11 ====
England v Germany Tournament

- 2015 (silver phase)

=== Other Honours ===
==== Brentford Griffins ====
Football Conference Youth Alliance / National League U19 Alliance

- London & South East Division: 2014–15
- Division F: 2015–16

== Noted graduates ==
Brentford's youth, reserve, Development Squad and B teams produced many players who made 25 or more appearances for the first team. Players marked * won a full international cap while with Brentford or later in their career. Players are listed according to the decade of their senior debut for the club.

Pre-1960
- (England) Alan Bassham
- (England) Wally Bragg
- (England) George Bristow
- (England) Gerry Cakebread
- (England) George Francis
- (England) Dennis Heath
- (England) Frank Latimer
- (England) Terry Ledgerton
- (England) Bertie Rosier
- (England) Sid Russell
- (England) Les Smith*
- (England) Jim Towers

1960s
- (England) Tom Anthony
- (England) George Dobson
- (England) Peter Gelson
- (England) Jimmy Gitsham
- (England) Alan Hawley
- (England) Keith Hooker
- (England) Gordon Phillips
- (England) Eddie Reeve
- (England) John Richardson
- (England) Fred Ryecraft

1970s
- (England) Bob Booker
- (England) Danis Salman
- (England) Nigel Smith
- (England) Paul Walker

1980s
- (England) Jamie Bates
- (England) Paul Buckle
- (England) Jason Cousins
- (Jamaica) Marcus Gayle*
- (England) Roger Joseph
- (England) Tony Lynch
- (England) Keith Millen
- (England) Robbie Peters
- (England) Terry Rowe

1990s
- (England) Marcus Bent
- (England) Scott Fitzgerald
- (England) Carl Hutchings
- (England) David McGhee
- (England) Kevin Rapley

2000s
- (England) Darius Charles
- (England) Michael Dobson
- (England) Charlie Ide
- (Republic of Ireland) Kevin O'Connor
- (England) Karleigh Osborne
- (England) Ryan Peters
- (Wales) Matt Somner
- (England) Mark Williams

2010s
- (England) Josh Clarke
- (Finland) Marcus Forss*
- (Wales) Chris Mepham*
- (England) Jake Reeves
- (Denmark) Mads Roerslev*
- (Denmark) Mads Bech Sørensen
- (Czech Republic) Jan Žambůrek

2020s
- (Ukraine) Yehor Yarmolyuk*

=== And those who made it elsewhere ===
Many former Brentford schoolboy, youth, reserve, Development Squad, B team and Community Sports Trust players found success with other clubs. Those marked † did not make a senior appearance for Brentford, but made a first team appearance for another club in a fully professional league or cup fixture. Players marked * won an international cap, at any level, while with Brentford or later in their career. Players are listed according to the decade of their senior debut or, if they did not make a senior appearance, the decade of their departure from the club.

Pre-1960
- (England) Philip Allen
- (England) Vernon Avis
- (England) Ted Ballard†
- (England) Tony Biggs†
- (England) Billy Bloomfield
- (England) Peter Broadbent*
- (England) Micky Bull
- (England) Donald Cock†
- (England) Alan Eagles†
- (Northern Ireland) Ray Ferris†*
- (England) Roy Hart*
- (England) Doug Keene
- (England) George Lowden
- (England) Vince McNeice†
- (England) John Moore
- (England) Frank Morrad
- (England) Robert Morris†
- (England) Johnny Pearson
- (England) Cecil Smith
- (England) Bert Stephens

1960s
- (Wales) Phil Basey
- (England) Robin Friday*
- (England) Joe Gadston†
- (England) Bobby Goldthorpe
- (England) John Jackson†
- (Scotland) Dick Lowrie†
- (England) Tim Souter

1970s
- (England) David Byrne†
- (England) Roy Cotton*
- (England) Graham Cox
- (England) Alan Devonshire†
- (England) Kevin Harding
- (England) Graham Pearce
- (England) Richard Poole
- (England) Gary Rolph
- (England) Gary Smith
- (England) Billy Stagg
- (Canada) Billy Sweetzer†

1980s
- (England) David Byrne†
- (England) Jimmy Dack†
- (England) Andy Driscoll
- (England) Andy Gray†*
- (England) Kelly Haag
- (England) Matthew Howard
- (England) Robert Rosario†*
- (England) Tony Spencer
- (England) Kevin Teer
- (England) Keith Tonge

1990s
- (England) Rocky Baptiste†
- (England) Ashley Bayes*
- (Australia) Jon Brady†*
- (England) Dean Clark
- (England) Peter Crouch†*
- (England) Ryan Denys
- (England) Tamer Fernandes*
- (England) Dean Hooper†
- (England) Clement James
- (England) Barry Miller†
- (Wales) Chris Moore
- (England) Scott Morgan
- (England) Warren Patmore†
- (England) Craig Ravenscroft
- (England) Nevin Saroya

2000s
- (Republic of Ireland) Denis Behan†*
- (England) Lloyd Blackman
- (England) Seb Brown
- (England) Karle Carder-Andrews
- (England) Lewis Dark
- (Bulgaria) Ivailo Dimitrov†*
- (England) Lee Fieldwick
- (England) Fraser Franks†
- (Scotland) Stephen Hendry†*
- (England) Sean Hillier
- (England) Stephen Hughes
- (England) Chris Hussey†
- (Northern Ireland) Alan Julian*
- (England) Josh Lennie
- (England) Clark Masters
- (England) Ross Montague
- (England) Luke Muldowney
- (England) Lewis Ochoa
- (Republic of Ireland) Lanre Oyebanjo†*
- (England) Jamie Palmer
- (England) Aaron Steele
- (England) Jay Smith
- (England) Bobby Traynor
- (England) Ryan Watts
- (England) Scott Weight
- (England) Dean Wells

2010s
- (England) Charlie Adams
- (England) Daniel Adu-Adjei†
- (England) Charlie Allen†
- (Scotland) Theo Archibald*
- (Germany) Raphael Assibey-Mensah†
- (England) Goran Babić†
- (Guinea-Bissau) Rachid Baldé†
- (Northern Ireland) Ryan Blake*
- (England) Joshua Bohui†*
- (Guyana) Elliot Bonds†*
- (England) James Bransgrove†
- (England) Chris Bush†
- (Greece) Ilias Chatzitheodoridis
- (England) Reece Cole
- (New Zealand) Matt Dibley-Dias†*
- (England) JJ Donnelly†
- (England) Emmanuel Fernandez†
- (England) James Ferry†
- (Republic of Ireland) Tom Field*
- (Iceland) Kolbeinn Finnsson†*
- (Antigua and Barbuda) Ronaldo Flowers†*
- (Saint Lucia) Chris Forino-Joseph†
- (Grenada) Antonio German*
- (Iceland) Patrik Gunnarsson*
- (Netherlands) Dennis Gyamfi†
- (Grenada) Myles Hippolyte†*
- (Germany) Jan Holldack
- (England) Zeno Ibsen Rossi†
- (England) Nile John†*
- (England) Paul Kalambayi†
- (Ghana) Sam Kuffour Jr.†
- (England) Levi Laing†*
- (England) Josh Laurent
- (England) Isaac Layne†
- (France) Thimothée Lo-Tutala†*
- (England) Dermi Lusala†*
- (Guyana) Ronayne Marsh-Brown†*
- (England) Alfie Mawson
- (England) Luke Mbete†*
- (England) Alfie McNally†
- (England) Tyrick Mitchell†*
- (England) Montell Moore
- (Guyana) Nathan Moriah-Welsh†*
- (England) Mikael Ndjoli†
- (England) Luke Norris
- (Slovenia) Jan Novak†
- (Republic of Ireland) Ollie O'Neill†*
- (Finland) Daniel O'Shaughnessy†*
- (Finland) Jaakko Oksanen*
- (England) Manny Onariase†
- (England) Michael Onovwigun†
- (England) Paul Osew†
- (Lebanon) Majed Osman†*
- (England) Seth Owens†
- (England) Manny Oyeleke
- (Grenada) Aaron Pierre*
- (Saint Vincent and the Grenadines) David Pitt†*
- (England) Ian Poveda†*
- (Denmark) Luka Racic*
- (Republic of Ireland) Lewis Richards†*
- (England) Courtney Senior
- (Denmark) Justin Shaibu*
- (England) Fumnaya Shomotun†
- (England) Xavier Simons†*
- (England) Harry Smith†
- (England) Showkat Tahir†*
- (Croatia) Nikola Tavares†*
- (New Zealand) Nik Tzanev†*
- (England) Jermaine Udumaga
- (Guyana) Terence Vancooten†*
- (Northern Ireland) Kyle Vassell†*
- (Chile) Lawrence Vigouroux†*
- (Syria) Abdul Rahman Weiss†*
- (England) Zain Westbrooke
- (England) Ollie Wright†

2020s
- (Wales) Joe Adams†*
- (Scotland) Vincent Angelini†
- (England) J'Neil Bennett†
- (Denmark) Mads Bidstrup*
- (Australia) Lachlan Brook†*
- (Republic of Ireland) Canice Carroll†*
- (Scotland) Ali Coote†
- (France) Tristan Crama†
- (Wales) Cole Dasilva†*
- (England) Max Dickov†
- (Republic of Ireland) Alex Gilbert*
- (Scotland) Lewis Gordon
- (Sweden) Fredrik Hammar*
- (England) Joe Hardy†
- (England) Ashley Hay†
- (England) Max Haygarth
- (England) Chanse Headman†
- (England) Ben Hockenhull†
- (Wales) Dom Jefferies†
- (Republic of Ireland) Nico Jones†
- (Scotland) Ethan Laidlaw†*
- (England) Kyreece Lisbie†
- (England) Paris Maghoma*
- (Czech Republic) Matěj Majka†
- (Republic of Ireland) Conor McManus†*
- (Denmark) Gustav Mogensen†*
- (Wales) Iwan Morgan†*
- (England) Jayden Onen†
- (England) Daniel Oyegoke†*
- (Scotland) Aaron Pressley
- (Albania) Edon Pruti†*
- (England) Arthur Read†
- (Wales) Nathan Shepperd†*
- (Wales) Fin Stevens*
- (Albania) Roy Syla†*
- (Zimbabwe) Marley Tavaziva†*
- (England) Ryan Trevitt
- (Cyprus) Nick Tsaroulla†*
- (England) Angel Waruih†
- (England) Ben Winterbottom†
- (England) Tony Yogane
- (England) Nathan Young-Coombes

== International players ==
Brentford's youth, reserve, Development Squad, B and Community Sports Trust teams have produced many players who were capped at full and youth international level during their career with the club.

Name	Nationality	Position	Capped	Ref.
Roy Syla	Albania	CM	U21	
Lachlan Brook	Australia	FW	U23	
Archie Trimboli	Australia	RB	U20, U17	
Luka Bentt	Belgium	MF	U19	
Michel Boni	Benin	FW	Full	
Nikola Tavares	Croatia	CB	U18	
Nick Tsaroulla	Cyprus	LB	U21	
Jan Žambůrek	Czech Republic	CM	U21, U19, U18	
Mads Bidstrup	Denmark	MF	U21	
Gustav Mogensen	Denmark	FW	U19, U18	
Luka Racic	Denmark	CB	U21, U20	
Mads Roerslev	Denmark	RB	Full, U21	
Justin Shaibu	Denmark	FW	U20	
Mads Bech Sørensen	Denmark	DF	U21, U19	
Lukas Talbro	Denmark	DF	U19, U18	
Benjamin Arthur	England	CB	U20, U19	
Ellery Balcombe	England	GK	U20, U19, U18	
Alan Bassham	England	RB	Schoolboy	
Ashley Bayes	England	GK	U18	
Joshua Bohui	England	FW	U17	
Paul Buckle	England	MF	Youth	
Gerry Cakebread	England	GK	Youth	
Roy Cotton	England	W	Youth	
Matthew Cox	England	GK	U20, U19	
Tamer Fernandes	England	GK	Youth	
Marcus Gayle	England	FW	U18	
Roy Hart	England	CH	Schoolboy	
Gary Huxley	England	LW	Youth	
Paris Maghoma	England	CM	U20	
Jai Nwosu	England	FW	U17	
Michael Olakigbe	England	LW	U20	
Daniel Oyegoke	England	RB	U20, U19	
Ian Poveda	England	W	U16	
Danis Salman	England	DF	Youth	
Gary Simons	England	n/a	Youth	
Les Smith	England	OL	Full	
Marcus Forss	Finland	FW	U21, U19	
Daniel O'Shaughnessy	Finland	CB	Full, U21, U20	
Jaakko Oksanen	Finland	MF	U21, U19	
Kolbeinn Finnsson	Iceland	W	Full, U21	
Patrik Gunnarsson	Iceland	GK	U21, U19	
David Titov	Latvia	FB	U21, U19	
Matas Klimas	Lithuania	DF	U19, U18	
Audrius Laučys	Lithuania	CB	U19	
Stefan Tomasevic	Montenegro	DF	U19	
Hatim Belhadj	Morocco	LW	U16	
Lachlan MacIntyre	New Zealand	n/a	U17	
Nik Tzanev	New Zealand	GK	U20	
Benjamin Fredrick	Nigeria	RB	Full	
Ryan Blake	Northern Ireland	LB	U21, U19	
Alan Julian	Northern Ireland	GK	U21, U19, U18	
Coran Madden	Northern Ireland	FW	U19, U17	
Ben Wilson	Northern Ireland	MF	U19	
Val Adedokun	Republic of Ireland	LB	U19	
Glenn Brophy	Republic of Ireland	n/a	U18	
Canice Carroll	Republic of Ireland	CB	U21	
Tom Field	Republic of Ireland	AM	U16	
Alex Gilbert	Republic of Ireland	LW	U21	
Conor McManus	Republic of Ireland	LB	U21	
Adrian Moyles	Republic of Ireland	FB	U17	
Kevin O'Connor	Republic of Ireland	U	U21	
Theo Archibald	Scotland	RW	U21	
Chris Dickson	Scotland	n/a	U17	
Stephen Hendry	Scotland	MF	U18	
Ethan Laidlaw	Scotland	FW	U19	
Jonny Mitchell	Scotland	MF	U19	
Romayn Pennant	Scotland	FB	U15	
Lionel Stone	Scotland	DF	U17	
Kim Ji-soo	South Korea	CB	Full, U23	
Simon Andersson	Sweden	GK	U19, U17	
Kiefer Gorman	Sweden	MF	U19	
Fredrik Hammar	Sweden	MF	U19	
Yehor Yarmolyuk	Ukraine	CM	Full, U23, U21, U19	
Jai Bansoodeb	United States	AM	U17	
Julian Eyestone	United States	GK	U23, U20	
Joe Adams	Wales	LW	U21, U20, U19	
Cole Dasilva	Wales	FB	U21	
Dylan Evans	Wales	DF	U15	
Luke Evans	Wales	DF	U18	
Julius Fenn-Evans	Wales	FW	U16	
Matt Flitter	Wales	DF	U18	
Chris Mepham	Wales	CB	Full, U21, U20	
Iwan Morgan	Wales	FW	U19	
Nathan Shepperd	Wales	GK	U21	
Matt Somner	Wales	DF	U21	
Fin Stevens	Wales	RB	Full, U21	
Marley Tavaziva	Zimbabwe	GK	Full	
