= Bill Livingstone (footballer) =

Scottish footballer

Personal information
- Full name: William Rennison Livingstone
- Date of birth: 8 February 1929
- Place of birth: Greenock, Scotland
- Date of death: March 2011 (aged 82)
- Place of death: Reading, England
- Positions: Centre half; right back

Youth career
- –1949: Ardeer Recreation

Senior career*
Years	Team	Apps	(Gls)
1949–1955	Reading	49	(2)
1955–1959	Chelsea	20	(0)
1959–1960	Brentford	19	(0)
1960–1961	Hastings United		
- * Club domestic league appearances and goals

William Rennison Livingstone (8 February 1929 – March 2011) was a Scottish professional footballer who played as a centre half in the Football League for Reading, Chelsea and Brentford.

== Playing career ==
=== Reading ===
Livingstone began his career in Scotland as a right back at junior club Ardeer Recreation, before securing a move to English Third Division South club Reading in April 1949. He had a slow start to life at Elm Park and failed make a first team breakthrough until the 1953–54 season, when he managed 31 league appearances. His appearances tailed off the following year and he departed the club at the end of the 1954–55 season. Livingstone made 52 appearances and scored two goals in six years with the Royals.

=== Chelsea ===
Livingstone moved to First Division club Chelsea in June 1955. He had to wait until November 1956 to enjoy a run in the team, when he made 12 appearances at centre half, before losing his place in January 1957. Livingstone was released at the end of the 1958–59 season and made just 22 appearances during four years at Stamford Bridge.

=== Brentford ===
Livingstone dropped to the Third Division to join Chelsea's West London neighbours Brentford on a free transfer in July 1959. Signed as cover for the injured Ian Dargie, Livingstone found himself behind Sid Russell in the pecking order in the first month of the 1959–60 season, before breaking into the team in September 1959 and holding down his place until January 1960, when Dargie returned to fitness. Livingstone was released in May 1960, after making 21 appearances for Brentford.

=== Hastings United ===
Livingstone dropped into non-League football to join Southern League Premier Division club Hastings United in 1960.

== Career statistics ==
Appearances and goals by club, season and competition
Club	Season	League			FA Cup		Total	
Club	Season	Division	Apps	Goals	Apps	Goals	Apps	Goals
Chelsea	1955–56	First Division	0	0	1	0	1	0
Chelsea	1956–57	First Division	12	0	1	0	13	0
Chelsea	1957–58	First Division	8	0	0	0	8	0
Chelsea	Total		20	0	2	0	22	0
Brentford	1959–60	Third Division	19	0	2	0	21	0
Career total			39	0	4	0	43	0
