= Johnny Hales =

Scottish footballer

Personal information
- Full name: John McKendrick Hales
- Date of birth: 15 May 1940 (age 86)
- Place of birth: Glasgow, Scotland
- Position: Winger

Senior career*
| Years | Team | Apps | (Gls) |
| –1959 | St Roch's | | |
| 1959–1964 | Brentford | 62 | (7) |
- * Club domestic league appearances and goals

John McKendrick Hales (born 15 May 1940) is a Scottish retired professional footballer who played in the Football League for Brentford as a winger.

== Career ==
=== St Roch's ===
A winger, Hales began his career in Glasgow with Central Scottish Amateur League junior club St Roch's and departed in September 1958.

=== Brentford ===
Hales and St Roch's teammates Charlie McInally and John Docherty moved to England to sign for Third Division club Brentford in September 1958. Hales had to wait until 30 April 1959 to make his first team debut, which came in an end-of-season game versus Norwich City. He made 20 appearances in the 1959–60 season, followed by 22 in 1960–61, before falling out of the first team picture and playing mostly for the reserves. Hales was released at the end of the 1963–64 season, having made 68 appearances and scored 7 goals in his five years as a first team player at Griffin Park. Along with Micky Ball and Fred Ryecraft, Hales is one of three players to make over 150 appearances for the reserve team.

== Career statistics ==
Appearances and goals by club, season and competition
| Club | Season | League | | | FA Cup | | League Cup | | Total | |
| Club | Season | Division | Apps | Goals | Apps | Goals | Apps | Goals | Apps | Goals |
|---|---|---|---|---|---|---|---|---|---|---|
| Brentford | 1958–59 | Third Division | 1 | 0 | 0 | 0 | — | | 1 | 0 |
| Brentford | 1959–60 | Third Division | 18 | 3 | 2 | 0 | — | | 20 | 3 |
| Brentford | 1960–61 | Third Division | 22 | 0 | 0 | 0 | 0 | 0 | 22 | 0 |
| Brentford | 1961–62 | Third Division | 8 | 0 | 0 | 0 | 1 | 0 | 9 | 0 |
| Brentford | 1962–63 | Fourth Division | 4 | 2 | 0 | 0 | 0 | 0 | 4 | 2 |
| Brentford | 1963–64 | Third Division | 9 | 2 | 3 | 0 | 0 | 0 | 12 | 2 |
| Career total | | | 62 | 7 | 5 | 0 | 1 | 0 | 68 | 7 |
