= David Pitt =

David Pitt may refer to:

- David Pitt (footballer) (born 1991), footballer for St Vincent and the Grenadines
- David Pitt, Baron Pitt of Hampstead (1913–1994), Grenada-born British politician
