= Joseph Wallace =

Joseph or Joe Wallace may refer to:

- Joe Wallace (1890–1975), Canadian poet, journalist, and communist activist
- Joe Wallace (EastEnders), fictional character on the television series EastEnders
- Joe Wallace (footballer) (1933–1993), Scottish footballer
- Joseph Wallace (animator), animator and film director
- Joseph Wallace (murder victim) (1989–1993), three-year-old boy who was murdered by his mother in Chicago, Illinois
- Joseph Wallace (vegetarian) (1820s–1910), Irish–British alternative medicine practitioner, patent medicine creator, writer, and activist
- Joseph Wallace (rugby union),Irish international rugby union player
