= Vernon Avis =

English footballer

Personal information
- Full name: Vernon Charles Sidney Avis
- Date of birth: 24 October 1935
- Place of birth: Marylebone, England
- Date of death: June 1996 (aged 60)
- Place of death: Northampton, England
- Positions: Left back; centre forward

Youth career
- 1952–1953: Brentford

Senior career*
Years	Team	Apps	(Gls)
1953–1961	Brentford	19	(0)
1961–1966	Bedford Town	179	(2)
- Rushden Town

Managerial career
- 1967: Bedford Town (caretaker)
- * Club domestic league appearances and goals

Vernon Charles Sidney Avis (24 October 1935 – June 1996) was an English footballer who played as a left back in the Football League for Brentford.

== Playing career ==
=== Brentford ===
Avis began his career in the youth team at Second Division club Brentford. He made his debut at age 18 in a 0–0 draw with Stoke City at Griffin Park on 12 December 1953. Due to national service and with Ken Coote ahead of him in the pecking order, Avis spent much of his subsequent Griffin Park career in the reserve team. His best first team appearance tally was 11, in the 1959–60 Third Division season. He departed the club in 1961, after making just 19 appearances.

=== Bedford Town ===
Avis dropped into non-League football and signed for Southern League Premier Division club Bedford Town in 1961. A left back by trade, Avis spent an early part of his Bedford career at centre forward. He made nearly 200 appearances over the course of five seasons, before hanging up his boots at the end of the 1965–66 campaign. Avis played two matches during the 1966–67 season as an emergency replacement. He left the club in 1967 and joined United Counties League First Division club Rushden Town.

== Managerial and coaching career ==
Avis became the trainer at Bedford Town in 1966, and stepped in as caretaker manager in April 1967. He departed the club when Ron Heckman was appointed first team manager later that month.

== Career statistics ==
Appearances and goals by club, season and competition
Club	Season	League			FA Cup		League Cup		Total	
Club	Season	Division	Apps	Goals	Apps	Goals	Apps	Goals	Apps	Goals
Brentford	1953–54	Second Division	1	0	0	0	—		1	0
Brentford	1956–57	Third Division South	1	0	0	0	—		1	0
Brentford	1959–60	Third Division	11	0	0	0	—		11	0
Brentford	1960–61	Third Division	6	0	0	0	0	0	6	0
Career total			19	0	0	0	0	0	19	0
