= Marley Tavaziva =

Footballer (born 2004)

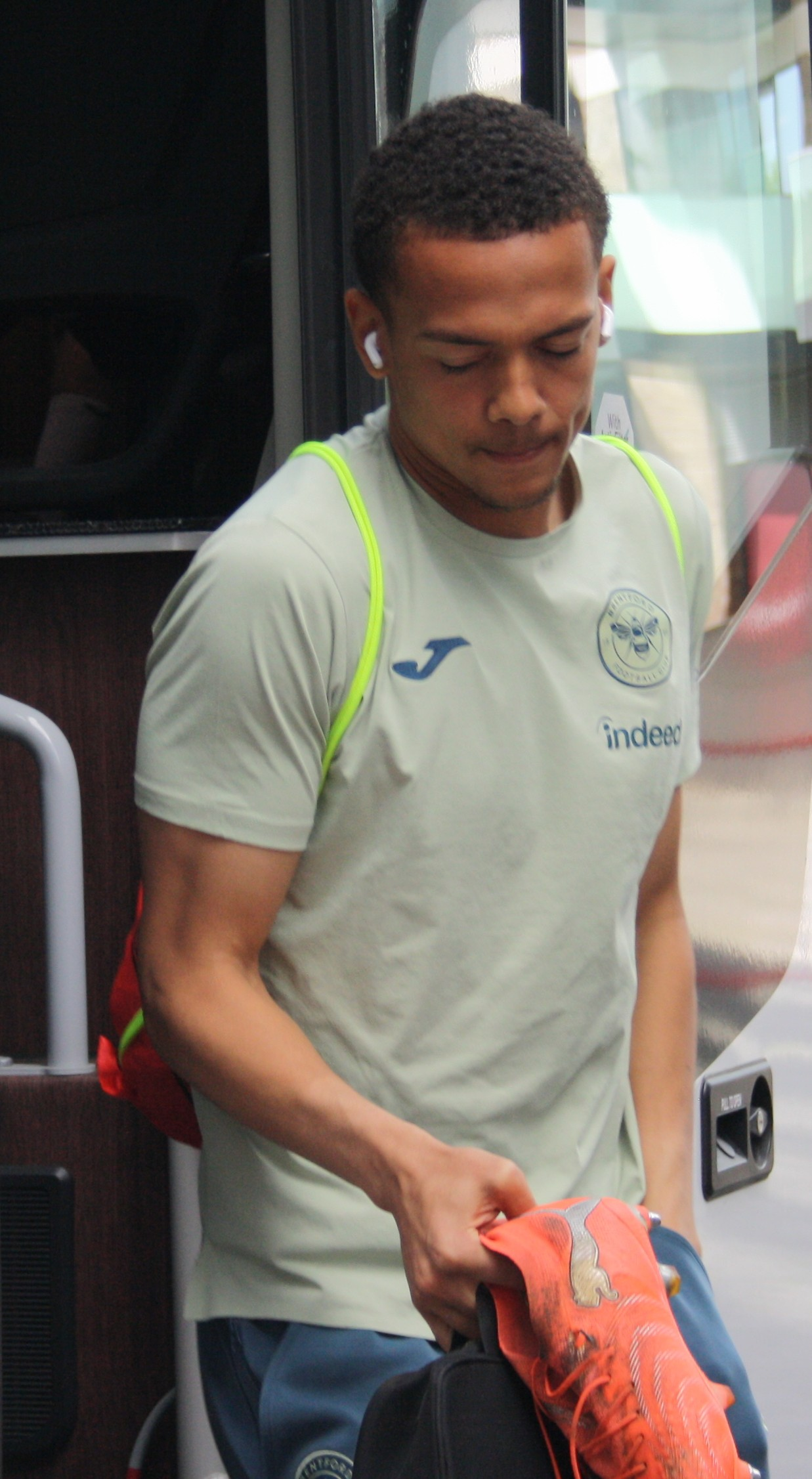
- Tavaziva prior to a Brentford B match in 2026

Personal information
- Full name: Marley Joseph Tavaziva
- Date of birth: 17 December 2004 (age 21)
- Place of birth: London, England
- Height: 1.83 m (6 ft 0 in)
- Position: Goalkeeper

Youth career
- Little Kickerz
- Hampton & Richmond Borough
- Sutton United
- –2026: Brentford

International career^{‡}
Years	Team	Apps	(Gls)
2025–	Zimbabwe	2	(0)
- ‡ National team caps and goals as of 10:47, 1 July 2026 (UTC)

Marley Joseph Tavaziva (born 17 December 2004) is a professional footballer who plays as a goalkeeper. Born in England, he represents the Zimbabwe national team at international level.

Tavaziva is a product of the Brentford Elite Development Education Football Programme and began his professional career with the club's B team in 2024. He made his full international debut for Zimbabwe in 2025.

== Club career ==
A goalkeeper, Tavaziva began his youth career with spells at Little Kickerz, Hampton & Richmond Borough and Sutton United. He progressed through the Brentford Elite Development Education Football Programme and made six National Youth League South Premier Division appearances for Brentford's U19 CST team during the 2021–22 season. He signed a two-year scholarship with the club's B team on 31 August 2022 and played concurrently for the U18 team during the 2022–23 and 2023–24 seasons. At the end of the 2023–24 season, the club exercised its option to extend Tavaziva's scholarship by a further year. After signing a one-year professional contract in July 2024, Tavaziva made 12 appearances during the 2024–25 season was part of the Professional U21 Development League-winning squad. He was retained for the 2025–26 season, but was absent through injury until early November 2025. Tavaziva was part of the 2025–26 Professional U21 Development League league phase-winning squad and was released at the end of the season.

== International career ==
In November 2023, Tavaziva was named in the provisional Zimbabwe squad for its opening 2026 World Cup qualifiers, but he was not named in the final selection due to injury. He was an unused substitute in five matches during the remainder of the 2023–24 season. Tavaziva was an unused substitute in 9 matches during the 2024–25 season, before making his debut as a half-time substitute in a 1–1 friendly draw with Niger on 10 June 2025. Tavaziva was a part of the 2026 Mukuru Four Nations Tournament-winning squad and was an unused substitute in both matches. He won his second cap with a start in a 1–0 2026 Unity Cup victory over India on 30 May 2026.

== Personal life ==
Tavaziva is of Zimbabwean descent. He attended Halliford School.

== Career statistics ==
=== International ===
As of match played 30 May 2026

Appearances and goals by national team and year
National team	Year	Apps	Goals
Zimbabwe	2025	2	0
Total		2	0

== Honours ==
Zimbabwe

- 2026 Mukuru Four Nations Tournament: 2026

Individual

- Hampton & Richmond Borough Supporters' U10 Youth Player of the Year: 2014–15
