= George McLeod (footballer, born 1932) =

Scottish footballer

Personal information
- Full name: George James McLeod
- Date of birth: 30 November 1932
- Place of birth: Inverness, Scotland
- Date of death: 5 September 2016 (aged 83)
- Place of death: Luton, England
- Height: 5 ft 10 in (1.78 m)
- Position: Winger

Senior career*
Years	Team	Apps	(Gls)
- Brora Rangers
–1955	Clachnacuddin		
1955–1958	Luton Town	51	(5)
1958–1964	Brentford	207	(20)
1964–1965	Queens Park Rangers	41	(4)
1965	Port Elizabeth City		
- * Club domestic league appearances and goals

George James McLeod (30 November 1932 – 5 September 2016) was a Scottish professional footballer who played as a winger in the Football League for Luton Town, Brentford and Queens Park Rangers.

== Playing career ==
=== Early years ===
Born in Inverness and brought up in Brora, McLeod began his career with Highland League clubs Brora Rangers and Clachnacuddin. He departed the latter club in January 1955.

=== Luton Town ===
McLeod moved to England to sign for Second Division high-flyers Luton Town in January 1955. He failed to make an immediate impact and made just one appearance in what remained of the 1954–55 season, in which the Hatters finished second in the Second Division to claim a place in the top-flight for the first time in the club's history. McLeod made 15 appearances and scored his first goal for the club during the 1955–56 season, before establishing himself in the team during 1957–58, making 35 appearances and scoring four goals. He made just one appearance during the early weeks of the 1958–59 season, before departing the club in October 1958. McLeod made 54 appearances and scored five goals during his time at Kenilworth Road.

=== Brentford ===
McLeod dropped down to Third Division to join Brentford for a £6,000 fee in October 1958. He quickly went on to establish himself in the team and was rarely absent, including chalking up a run of 132 consecutive appearances, which included a career-high 52 games during the 1961–62 season. McLeod was an ever-present during the 1962–63 Fourth Division championship-winning season, making 49 appearances as Brentford were promoted back to the Third Division at the first attempt. McLeod fell out of favour during the 1963–64 season, departing Griffin Park in January 1964. McLeod made 232 appearances and scored 22 goals during his six years with the Bees.

=== Queens Park Rangers ===
McLeod signed for Brentford's Third Division West London rivals Queens Park Rangers in January 1964, in a part exchange deal which saw Mark Lazarus move to Brentford for an £8,000 fee. He made 42 appearances and scored four goals before departing at the end of the 1964–65 season.

=== Port Elizabeth City ===
McLeod ended his career with a spell in South Africa at National Football League club Port Elizabeth City, playing under former Brentford teammate Matt Crowe.

== Personal life ==
McLeod, a widower, died on 5 September 2016 at the age of 83; he was survived by one daughter and four brothers. Two of his relatives also became footballers – Alisdair Sutherland and John McLeod (Buckie Thistle). After his retirement from football, McLeod became a publican in Steppingley and Wootton. After his death his ashes were scattered in the River Brora.

== Career statistics ==
Appearances and goals by club, season and competition
Club	Season	League			FA Cup		League Cup		Total	
Club	Season	Division	Apps	Goals	Apps	Goals	Apps	Goals	Apps	Goals
Luton Town	1955–56	First Division	1	0	0	0	—		1	0
Luton Town	1956–57	First Division	15	1	2	0	—		17	1
Luton Town	1957–58	First Division	34	4	1	0	—		35	4
Luton Town	1958–59	First Division	1	0	—		—		1	0
Luton Town	Total		51	5	3	0	—		54	5
Brentford	1958–59	Third Division	29	5	4	0	—		33	5
Brentford	1959–60	Third Division	36	4	1	0	—		37	4
Brentford	1960–61	Third Division	36	3	2	0	3	1	41	4
Brentford	1961–62	Third Division	46	3	5	0	1	1	52	4
Brentford	1962–63	Fourth Division	46	4	1	0	2	0	49	4
Brentford	1963–64	Third Division	14	1	3	0	3	0	20	1
Brentford	Total		207	20	16	0	9	2	232	22
Queens Park Rangers	1963–64	Third Division	17	4	—		—		17	4
Queens Park Rangers	1964–65	Third Division	24	0	0	0	1	0	25	0
Queens Park Rangers	Total		41	4	0	0	1	0	42	4
Career total			299	29	19	0	10	2	328	31

== Honours ==
Brentford

- Football League Third Division: 1962–63
