= Terry Curran (footballer, born 1940) =

English footballer

Personal information
- Full name: Terence William Curran
- Date of birth: 29 June 1940
- Place of birth: Staines, England
- Date of death: May 2000 (aged 59)
- Place of death: Reading, England
- Position: Inside forward

Youth career
- Tottenham Hotspur
- 1957–1960: Brentford

Senior career*
Years	Team	Apps	(Gls)
1960–1961	Brentford	5	(0)
1961–1963	Kettering Town		
1964–1965	Corby Town		
- Sittingbourne
- * Club domestic league appearances and goals

Terence William Curran (29 June 1940 – May 2000) was an English professional footballer who played as an inside forward in the Football League for Brentford.

== Career statistics ==
Appearances and goals by club, season and competition
Club	Season	League			FA Cup		League Cup		Total	
Club	Season	Division	Apps	Goals	Apps	Goals	Apps	Goals	Apps	Goals
Brentford	1960–61	Third Division	5	0	0	0	0	0	5	0
Career total			5	0	0	0	0	0	5	0
