= Stephen James (model) =

British footballer and model (born 1990)

- Born: Stephen James Hendry; 4 December 1990 (age 35); Hammersmith, London, England
- Occupation: Fashion model
- Known for: Model, professional footballer

Stephen James Hendry (born 4 December 1990), known professionally as Stephen James, is a British model.

== Modelling career ==
James began modelling after being scouted in Barcelona by an Elite Model Management agent in September 2012. His work includes Calvin Klein, Takeshy Kurosawa, Philipp Plein, Diesel, XTI, GQ Germany, GQ Spain, Adon Magazine, ASOS, Men's Health, El Pais Semanal, Sik Silk and Windsor Smith. His agencies include Elite Model Management (Paris, Barcelona, Copenhagen), Unsigned Group (London), I Love Models (Milan) and Wilhelmina Models (New York, Los Angeles). James has modelled since 2012, mostly in Europe, North America, Australia and Japan. In 2017, he modelled for Madonna's MDNA skin care range.

== Football career ==
Stephen James
Personal information
- Position: Midfielder

Youth career
- 2005: Queens Park Rangers
- 2006–2008: Brentford

Senior career*
Years	Team	Apps	(Gls)
2008	Brentford	0	(0)
2008–2009	AFC Wimbledon	4	(0)
2009–2010	Nea Salamis Famagusta	7	(0)

International career
2007	Scotland U18	3	(0)
- * Club domestic league appearances and goals

=== Club ===
A Midfielder, Hendry was a member of the youth team at Brentford before his release in 2008. He went into the youth system at non-league club AFC Wimbledon, before making professional appearances with Cypriot First Division club Nea Salamis Famagusta. On 18 July 2010, Super League Greece club Asteras Tripolis named Hendry in their 28 player squad to travel Australia for pre-season preparations, but he failed to win a contract.

=== International ===
In October 2007, Hendry was called up to the Scotland U18 squad for a four-way international tournament in France. He made his international debut when he came on for Michael Graham after 65 minutes of the second match of the competition versus the hosts. He started in the final match against the United States, lasting 71 minutes of the 1–1 draw before being replaced by Craig Connell. He finished his international career with two caps.

== Personal life ==
James is Jewish.
