= Billy Goundry =

English footballer

Personal information
- Full name: William Goundry
- Date of birth: 28 March 1934
- Place of birth: Middlesbrough, England
- Date of death: February 2012 (aged 77)
- Place of death: Cleveland, England
- Height: 5 ft 8 in (1.73 m)
- Position: Wing half

Senior career*
| Years | Team | Apps | (Gls) |
| –1955 | Huddersfield Town | 0 | (0) |
| 1955–1961 | Brentford | 141 | (12) |
| 1961–1964 | Bedford Town | 156 | (5) |
- Hastings United
- * Club domestic league appearances and goals

William Goundry (28 March 1934 – February 2012) was an English professional footballer who played as a wing half. A "hard player", he is best remembered for his six years in the Football League with Brentford, for whom he made over 140 appearances.

== Playing career ==
=== Huddersfield Town ===
A wing half, Goundry began his career as an amateur with First Division club Huddersfield Town and failed to make a first team appearance before departing at the end of the 1954–55 season.

=== Brentford ===
Goundry signed for Third Division South club Brentford in May 1955. Goundry was a regular part of a team which consistently challenged for promotion from the division, only to fall short. He made a career-high 42 appearances during the 1959–60 season, but found himself released at the end of the following campaign due to maximum wage restrictions. Goundry made 148 appearances and scored 12 goals during his six years at Griffin Park.

=== Non-League football ===
After his release from Brentford, Goundry dropped into non-League football and joined Southern League Premier Division club Bedford Town during the 1961 off-season. He made 156 appearances and scored five goals before departing in 1964 and ending his career with Hastings United.

== Personal life ==
Prior to becoming a professional footballer with Brentford, Goundry served in the British Army.

== Career statistics ==
Appearances and goals by club, season and competition
| Club | Season | League | | | FA Cup | | League Cup | | Total | |
| Club | Season | Division | Apps | Goals | Apps | Goals | Apps | Goals | Apps | Goals |
|---|---|---|---|---|---|---|---|---|---|---|
| Brentford | 1955–56 | Third Division South | 23 | 1 | 0 | 0 | — | | 23 | 1 |
| Brentford | 1956–57 | Third Division South | 31 | 6 | 2 | 0 | — | | 33 | 6 |
| Brentford | 1957–58 | Third Division South | 12 | 1 | 1 | 0 | — | | 13 | 1 |
| Brentford | 1958–59 | Third Division | 12 | 0 | 1 | 0 | — | | 13 | 0 |
| Brentford | 1959–60 | Third Division | 40 | 2 | 2 | 0 | — | | 42 | 2 |
| Brentford | 1960–61 | Third Division | 23 | 2 | 0 | 0 | 1 | 0 | 24 | 2 |
| Career total | | | 141 | 12 | 4 | 0 | 1 | 0 | 146 | 12 |
