= Danny O'Donnell (footballer, born 1939) =

Scottish footballer (1939–2024)

Personal information
- Full name: Daniel O'Donnell
- Date of birth: 27 February 1939
- Place of birth: Dumbarton, Scotland
- Date of death: April 2024 (aged 85)
- Position: Inside forward

Senior career*
Years	Team	Apps	(Gls)
- Kirkintilloch Rob Roy
1960–1962	Brentford	11	(0)
1960	→ Dumbarton	1	(0)
1962–1963	Brechin City	3	(1)
1964–1965	Tonbridge		
- Vale of Leven

International career
1959	Scotland Juniors	1	(0)
- * Club domestic league appearances and goals

Daniel O'Donnell (27 February 1939 – April 2024) was a Scottish professional footballer who played as an inside forward in the Football League for Brentford. He also played in the Scottish League for Brechin City and hometown club Dumbarton. O'Donnell died in April 2024, at the age of 85.

== Career statistics ==
Appearances and goals by club, season and competition
Club	Season	League			National Cup		League Cup		Total	
Club	Season	Division	Apps	Goals	Apps	Goals	Apps	Goals	Apps	Goals
Brentford	1960–61	Third Division	2	0	0	0	0	0	2	0
Brentford	1961–62	Third Division	9	0	0	0	0	0	9	0
Career total			11	0	0	0	0	0	11	0
