= Matt Somner =

Footballer (born 1982)

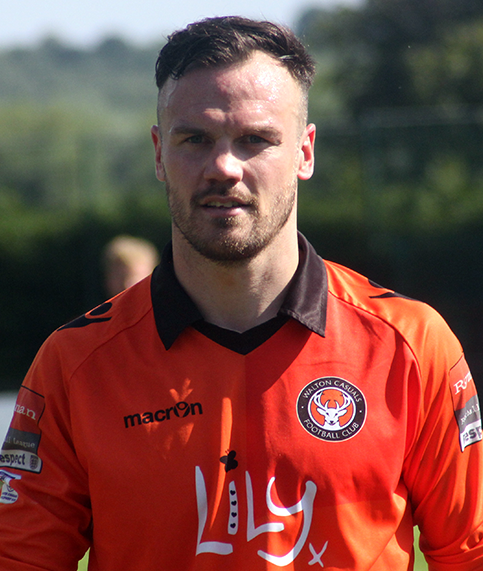
- Somner playing for Walton Casuals in 2015

Personal information
- Full name: Matthew James Somner
- Date of birth: 8 December 1982 (age 43)
- Place of birth: Isleworth, England
- Height: 6 ft 0 in (1.83 m)
- Positions: Defender; midfielder

Youth career
- Brentford

Senior career*
Years	Team	Apps	(Gls)
2000–2005	Brentford	84	(1)
2004–2005	→ Cambridge United (loan)	8	(0)
2005	Cambridge United	16	(0)
2005	Bristol Rovers	1	(0)
2005–2006	Aldershot Town	31	(3)
2006–2008	Notts County	54	(1)
2008–2011	Mansfield Town	64	(1)
2010–2011	→ Altrincham (loan)	9	(0)
2011	Forest Green Rovers	16	(1)
2011–2012	Lewes	45	(2)
2012–2014	Kingstonian		
2015–2016	Walton Casuals	2	(0)
2016	Walton & Hersham		

International career
2003	Wales U21	2	(0)
- * Club domestic league appearances and goals

Matthew James Somner (born 8 December 1982) is a footballer who played for Walton & Hersham. A utility player, Somner can play in numerous position across both defence and midfield. Born in England, he made two appearances for the Wales U21 national team.

== Career ==
Born in Isleworth, London, Somner began his career with local club Brentford, situated just 2 km from his native Isleworth. His professional debut came on 1 May 2001, in a 6–0 defeat to Swansea City. During his time at Griffin Park, he was called into the Wales-U21 squad to play Italy-U21s in 2003. The game finished disastrously for Wales as they lost 8–1.

Somner spent four seasons at Brentford, where he played in 93 games, before his contract was cancelled my mutual consent on 31 January 2005. He joined League Two side Cambridge United two days later, having had a loan spell at the club in December 2004. He was offered a new contract at the end of the season, though turned it down and instead joined Bristol Rovers on non-contract terms. He made only one appearance before signing for Conference National side Aldershot Town on 19 August 2005.

His contract not renewed at Aldershot, Somner joined Notts County in 2006, playing in 62 games over two seasons.

Somner was released by Notts County in 2008, and signed for Mansfield Town on 1 August 2008. He joined Altrincham on loan in November 2010.

On 31 January 2011, Somner signed for Forest Green Rovers after being released by Mansfield. He made his debut for Forest Green on 5 February 2011 in a home win against Hayes & Yeading United. Somner revealed on his Twitter page ahead of Rovers final game of the season that he would not be offered a new contract by the club. He would go on to score for Forest Green in their last game of the season against Tamworth.

Somner signed for Lewes in July 2011. He then joined Kingstonian in the summer of 2012. After a lengthy spell at Kingsmeadow, which included taking the captain's armband, he dropped to the Isthmian Division One South for the 2014–15 season, joining Walton Casuals. Managing just two appearances for the Stags, he left at the end of August and took a short break from football. However, he returned to the league in late February, joining rivals Walton & Hersham.

== Career statistics ==
Appearances and goals by club, season and competition
Club	Season	League			FA Cup		League Cup		Other		Total	
Club	Season	Division	Apps	Goals	Apps	Goals	Apps	Goals	Apps	Goals	Apps	Goals
Brentford	2000–01	Second Division	3	0	0	0	0	0	0	0	3	0
Brentford	2002–03	Second Division	40	1	3	1	1	0	1 (Note: Appearances in Football League Trophy)	0	45	2
Brentford	2003–04	Second Division	39	0	2	0	1	0	1	0	43	0
Brentford	2004–05	League One	2	0	0	0	0	0	0	0	2	0
Brentford	Total		84	1	5	1	2	0	2	0	93	2
Cambridge United	2004–05	League Two	24	0	―		―		―		24	0
Bristol Rovers	2005–06	League Two	1	0	―		―		―		1	0
Aldershot Town	2005–06	Conference Premier	31	3	2	0	―		1	0	34	3
Notts County	2006–07	League Two	38	1	1	0	3	0	1	0	43	1
Notts County	2007–08	League Two	16	0	2	0	0	0	1	0	19	0
Notts County	Total		54	1	3	0	3	0	2	0	62	1
Mansfield Town	2008–09	Conference Premier	35	1	1	0	―		0	0	36	1
Mansfield Town	2009–10	Conference Premier	29	0	0	0	―		0	0	29	0
Mansfield Town	Total		64	1	1	0	―		0	0	65	1
Altrincham (loan)	2010–11	Conference Premier	9	0	1	0	―		1	0	11	0
Forest Green Rovers	2010–11	Conference Premier	16	1	―		―		―		16	1
Lewes	2011–12	Isthmian League Premier Division	35	0	0	0	―		5 (Note: Appearances in Isthmian League Cup)	1	40	1
Kingstonian	2013–14	Isthmian League Premier Division	11	0	1	0	―		1	0	13	0
Career total			329	7	13	2	5	0	12	1	359	10
