= John Higgins (footballer, born 1930) =

Scottish footballer

Personal information
- Full name: John Wilson Higgins
- Date of birth: 27 January 1930
- Place of birth: Kilmarnock, Scotland
- Date of death: 21 June 2017 (aged 87)
- Place of death: Crossgates nursing home
- Position: Defender

Youth career
- 1950–1951: Bonnyton Thistle ( Kilmarnock )

Senior career*
Years	Team	Apps	(Gls)
1952–1957	Hibernian	12	(0)
1957–1959	St Mirren	23	(0)
1959–1961	Swindon Town	28	(0)
Total		63	(0)
- * Club domestic league appearances and goals

John Wilson Higgins (27 January 1930 – 21 June 2017) was a Scottish professional footballer who played as a defender. Born in Kilmarnock, Higgins began his football career with Edinburgh club Hibernian. He played for Hibs in the 1955–56 European Cup, as part of the first British club to enter European competition. Higgins then played for St Mirren for two seasons between 1957 and 1959. He was part of the St Mirren squad when they won the 1958–59 Scottish Cup, but he missed the final after contracting a viral infection. Higgins then played in the Football League for Swindon Town between 1959 and 1961.

Higgins died in June 2017, aged 87, after battling Alzheimer's disease.
