= Charlie McInally =

Scottish footballer

Personal information
- Full name: Charles McInally
- Date of birth: 1 February 1939 (age 87)
- Place of birth: Glasgow, Scotland
- Position: Wing half

Youth career
- St Roch's
- 1958–1959: Brentford

Senior career*
Years	Team	Apps	(Gls)
1959–1960	Brentford	1	(0)
1960–1961	Albion Rovers	24	(5)
- Petershill
- * Club domestic league appearances and goals

Charles McInally (born 1 February 1939) is a Scottish retired professional football wing half who played in the Football League for Brentford. He also played in the Scottish League for Albion Rovers.

== Personal life ==
McInally's son Tony played for Queen's Park and Albion Rovers in the Scottish League and as a manager he won the 2011–12 Scottish Junior Cup with Shotts Bon Accord.

== Career statistics ==
Appearances and goals by club, season and competition
Club	Season	League			National Cup		Total	
Club	Season	Division	Apps	Goals	Apps	Goals	Apps	Goals
Brentford	1959–60	Third Division	1	0	0	0	1	0
Career total			1	0	0	0	1	0
