= Joe Wallace (footballer) =

Scottish footballer

Personal information
- Full name: Joseph Burt Wallace
- Date of birth: 28 December 1933
- Place of birth: Dennistoun, Scotland
- Date of death: 19 April 1993 (aged 59)
- Place of death: Shrewsbury, England
- Position: Half back

Senior career*
Years	Team	Apps	(Gls)
- RAOC Donnington
1954–1962	Shrewsbury Town	337	(3)
1962–1965	Southport	78	(0)
- * Club domestic league appearances and goals

Joseph Burt Wallace (28 December 1933 – 19 April 1993) was a Scottish professional footballer who made over 330 appearances in the Football League for Shrewsbury Town as a half back.

== Personal life ==
Prior to signing for Shrewsbury Town, Wallace served in the army and was stationed at Donnington. After retiring from football, he ran a pub in Shrewsbury and a fish and chip shop in Coton Hill. He died of cancer in 1993.

== Career statistics ==
Appearances and goals by club, season and competition
Season	Club	League			FA Cup		League Cup		Other		Total	
Season	Club	Division	Apps	Goals	Apps	Goals	Apps	Goals	Apps	Goals	Apps	Goals
Southport	1962–63	Fourth Division	27	0	0	0	0	0	2 (Note: Appearances in Liverpool Senior Cup)	0	29	0
Southport	1963–64	Fourth Division	46	0	2	0	2	0	5 (Note: 4 appearances in Lancashire Senior Cup, 1 appearance in Liverpool Senior Cup)	0	55	0
Southport	1964–65	Fourth Division	5	0	0	0	0	0	1	0	6	0
Career total			78	0	2	0	2	0	8	0	90	0
