= David Pitt (footballer) =

Vincentian international footballer (born 1991)

Personal information
- Full name: David Pitt
- Date of birth: 2 September 1991 (age 35)
- Position: Striker

Youth career
- 2008–2010: Brentford

Senior career*
Years	Team	Apps	(Gls)
2010	Worthing		
2011–2012	APEP	14	(1)
2015–2016	Ascot United	27	(17)
2016–2017	Brackley Town	17	(3)
2017	Hayes & Yeading United	2	(1)
2017	Barton Rovers		
2018–2019	Bedfont Sports		
2019	Chalfont St Peter	5	(1)
2020	Stratford Town	1	(0)
2020	Broadfields United	5	(1)
2021–2022	Staines Town	5	(5)
2022–2023	Ashford Town	3	(2)
2023	Aylesbury United	10	(1)

International career^{‡}
	Jamaica U18	2	
2016	St Vincent and the Grenadines	2	(0)
- * Club domestic league appearances and goals ‡ National team caps and goals as of 11 July 2016

David Pitt (born 2 September 1991) is a Vincentian international footballer.

== Club career ==
Pitt was an apprentice at Brentford, breaking into the club's reserve team. He was loaned to Worthing on work experience towards the end of the 2009–10 season. After playing for Ascot United between 2015 and 2016, he signed for Brackley Town in the summer of 2016. He subsequently played for Hayes & Yeading United and Barton Rovers in 2017, Bedfont Sports in 2018–19, Chalfont St Peter in 2019, Stratford Town and Broadfields United in 2020. In 2021 he signed for Staines Town. He moved onto Ashford Town in 2022 and Aylesbury United in January 2023.

== International career ==
After playing two matches for the Jamaica under-18 side, Pitt switched allegiance to St Vincent. He was called up to the St Vincent squad for the 2018 World Cup qualifier matches against Trinidad & Tobago. He made his debut in a 3–2 defeat at home in the first match on 25 March 2016, and was an unused substitute in the return match on 29 March, which Trinidad won 6–0. He won his second cap in a 2017 Caribbean Cup qualification match against Suriname on 4 June.
