= Sid Russell =

English cricketer and footballer

Personal information
- Full name: Sidney Edward James Russell
- Born: 4 October 1937; Feltham, Middlesex, England
- Died: 18 June 1994 (aged 56); Quebec, Canada
- Height: 5 ft 10 in (178 cm)
- Batting: Right-handed
- Bowling: Right-arm medium
- Role: Batsman

Domestic team information
- Years: Team
- 1960–1964: Middlesex
- 1965–1968: Gloucestershire
- FC debut: 21 May 1960 Middlesex v Oxford Univ.
- Last FC: 2 September 1968 Gloucestershire v Somerset

Career statistics
Competition	First-class	List A
Matches	142	5
Runs scored	5,464	131
Batting average	23.86	26.20
100s/50s	4/21	0/1
Top score	130	62
Balls bowled	234	8
Wickets	2	1
Bowling average	60.50	4.00
5 wickets in innings	0	0
10 wickets in match	0	0
Best bowling	1/8	1/4
Catches/stumpings	41/–	2/–
- Source: CricketArchive, 10 September 2008

Sid Russell
Personal information
- Position: Left back

Senior career*
Years	Team	Apps	(Gls)
1956–1961	Brentford	54	(0)
- Bexleyheath & Welling
- * Club domestic league appearances and goals

Sidney Edward James Russell (4 October 1937 – 18 June 1994) was an English cricketer and footballer.

Sid Russell was born in Feltham, Middlesex and played in 142 first-class cricket matches for Middlesex (1960–1964), Marylebone Cricket Club (MCC) (1961) and Gloucestershire (1965–1968) as a sound right-handed batsman, scoring 5,464 runs (average 23.86), with a highest score of 130. He scored 4 centuries and 21 fifties, as well as taking 41 catches.

He played in 61 matches for Middlesex as an uncapped professional. He scored 2,681 runs from 105 innings at an average score of 27.63, with a top score of 130. He scored 1,119 runs at 31.08 in his debut season, a feat that he later repeated for Gloucestershire. He later played club cricket in the Bristol area of Almondsbury and for the Civil Service.

He also played in 54 Football League matches as a left back for Brentford between 1956 and 1961. He died from a heart attack in Quebec, Canada aged 56.
