= 1946–47 Brentford F.C. season =

English football team season

Brentford
1946–47 season
- Chairman: Frank Davis
- Manager: Harry Curtis
- Stadium: Griffin Park
- First Division: 21st
- FA Cup: Fourth round
- Top goalscorer: League: Townsend (8); All: Townsend (9)
- Highest home attendance: 35,604
- Lowest home attendance: 17,976
- Average home league attendance: 25,768
Home colours

During the 1946–47 English football season, Brentford competed in the Football League First Division. The Bees' 12-year run in the First Division ended with relegation to the Second Division after a disastrous season, which tied the club record for fewest league victories and most league defeats. The club did not play again in the top-tier until 2021–22, 74 years later.

== Season summary ==
After three successive top-six finishes in the First Division beginning in 1935–36, Brentford's decline began with the departure of key players during the 1938–39 season, which culminated with a near-relegation. For 1946–47, the first Football League season since the end of the Second World War, manager Harry Curtis was able to call on many of his regular players from the final pre-war seasons, though the elder players, such as Irish international full back Bill Gorman, utility man Buster Brown and former Wales forward Idris Hopkins, were all at age 35. Long-serving forward and once-capped England international Billy Scott had remained with the club and was then aged 38. The team fielded versus Aston Villa on 1 February 1947 was the oldest in club history, with an average age of over 31.5 years. Curtis supplemented the squad by bringing in wing half Cyril Toulouse and forwards John Gillies, Maurice Roberts and George Stewart. As in the final pre-war seasons, Curtis would also promote players from the Bees' reserve ranks, signing amateur Roddy Munro to a professional contract and handing debuts to Frank Latimer, John Moore and Wally Bragg, with Bragg going on to become the youngest-ever Brentford debutant at that time.

Brentford had a good start to the season, winning four of the first five matches and going top on the opening day. The majority of the team's goals were scored by forwards Gerry McAloon, Fred Durrant and George Wilkins, but when the goals dried up in September 1946, Brentford's form took a turn for the worse. Matters were made worse when McAloon and Durrant were quickly sold to Celtic and Queens Park Rangers respectively. A supporter, writing to The Brentford & Chiswick Times, commented "it would seem that Brentford were unaware when they allowed them to go that Thomas, Durrant and McAloon had scored very nearly all the side’s goals in the previous season". Manager Curtis received half back George Paterson from Celtic in part exchange for McAloon and also strengthened the team with full back Malky Macdonald and forward Archie Macaulay. By December, Brentford had dropped into the relegation places and a run of 11 losses in 15 matches culminated in the heaviest defeat of the season – 6–1 away to Sheffield United on Christmas Day.

Brentford's form improved after the Christmas Day thrashing, going undefeated in four of the following five matches to climb out of the relegation places, but from February 1947 onwards, the team's form evaporated. Despite Len Townsend coming into form and going on to become the Bees' top scorer for the season, the goalscoring problem was compounded by the transfer request and subsequent sale of George Wilkins in February. Bill Naylor and Dickie Girling were signed in February to bolster the forward line, but scored just three goals between them before the end of the season. On 24 May, defeat to Sunderland and a draw for 20th-place Charlton Athletic away to Everton consigned the Bees to relegation to the Second Division. By the time of the final day of the season on 14 June, Brentford had lost 14 of the final 19 matches.

The relegation was the first suffered by the club since it joined the Football League in 1920 and it was the club's final top-flight season until 2021–22, 74 years later. A number of club Football League records were equalled or broken during the season, including fewest victories (9), fewest home victories (5), most defeats (26), most home defeats (11), fewest home goals scored (19) and highest average attendance (25,768).

== League table ==
Pos	Team	Pld	W	D	L	GF	GA	GAv	Pts	Relegation
18	Bolton Wanderers	42	13	8	21	57	69	0.826	34	
19	Charlton Athletic	42	11	12	19	57	71	0.803	34	
20	Huddersfield Town	42	13	7	22	53	79	0.671	33	
21	Brentford (R)	42	9	7	26	45	88	0.511	25	Relegation to the Second Division
22	Leeds United (R)	42	6	6	30	45	90	0.500	18	Relegation to the Second Division

Source: World Football
Rules for classification: 1) Points; 2) Goal average; 3) Goals scored
(R) Relegated

== Results ==
Brentford's goal tally listed first.

=== Legend ===
Win	Draw	Loss

=== Football League First Division ===
No.	Date	Opponent	Venue	Result	Attendance	Scorer(s)
1	31 August 1946	Everton	A	2–1	55,338	Wilkins (pen), McAloon
2	2 September 1946	Blackpool	A	2–4	24,230	Durrant, Wilkins (pen)
3	7 September 1946	Huddersfield Town	H	2–0	31,407	Wilkins, McAloon
4	14 September 1946	Wolverhampton Wanderers	A	2–1	34,446	Durrant (2)
5	18 September 1946	Blackpool	H	2–1	25,621	McAloon, G. Smith
6	21 September 1946	Sunderland	H	0–3	33,766	
7	28 September 1946	Aston Villa	A	2–5	45,350	Wilkins (pen), McAloon
8	5 October 1946	Derby County	H	0–3	34,746	
9	12 October 1946	Arsenal	A	2–2	43,367	Blakeman (2)
10	19 October 1946	Preston North End	H	2–3	25,303	Blakeman (2)
11	26 October 1946	Liverpool	A	0–1	43,892	
12	2 November 1946	Bolton Wanderers	H	1–0	23,782	Howe (og)
13	9 November 1946	Chelsea	A	2–3	50,242	Hopkins (2)
14	16 November 1946	Charlton Athletic	H	1–4	26,648	Townsend
15	23 November 1946	Grimsby Town	A	2–2	16,750	Macaulay, Townsend
16	30 November 1946	Leeds United	H	1–1	20,352	Townsend
17	7 December 1946	Manchester United	A	1–4	31,956	Macaulay
18	14 December 1946	Stoke City	H	1–5	30,189	Macdonald
19	21 December 1946	Middlesbrough	A	0–2	28,750	
20	25 December 1946	Sheffield United	A	1–6	36,156	Townsend
21	26 December 1946	Sheffield United	H	2–1	29,535	A. Smith, Wilkins
22	28 December 1946	Everton	H	1–1	29,360	Hopkins
23	1 January 1947	Blackburn Rovers	A	3–0	29,067	Townsend, Wilkins, Stewart
24	4 January 1947	Huddersfield Town	A	0–3	27,759	
25	18 January 1947	Wolverhampton Wanderers	H	4–1	35,604	Wilkins, Stewart, Townsend, A. Smith
26	1 February 1947	Aston Villa	H	0–2	21,692	
27	22 February 1947	Preston North End	A	2–5	25,591	Townsend, A. Smith
28	1 March 1947	Derby County	A	1–2	18,691	Leuty (og)
29	15 March 1947	Chelsea	H	0–2	33,498	
30	22 March 1947	Charlton Athletic	A	0–3	29,327	
31	29 March 1947	Grimsby Town	H	0–1	19,778	
32	4 April 1947	Portsmouth	H	1–3	24,570	Hopkins
33	5 April 1947	Leeds United	A	2–1	23,962	Naylor, Girling
34	7 April 1947	Portsmouth	A	0–3	33,409	
35	12 April 1947	Manchester United	H	0–0	22,035	
36	19 April 1947	Stoke City	A	1–3	28,966	Naylor
37	26 April 1947	Middlesbrough	H	0–0	19,020	
38	3 May 1947	Blackburn Rovers	H	0–3	18,022	
39	10 May 1947	Bolton Wanderers	A	0–1	19,887	
40	17 May 1947	Liverpool	H	1–1	18,228	Stewart
41	24 May 1947	Sunderland	A	1–2	20,160	Townsend
42	26 May 1947	Arsenal	H	0–1	17,976	

=== FA Cup ===
Round	Date	Opponent	Venue	Result	Attendance	Scorer(s)	Notes
3R	11 January 1947	Cardiff City	H	1–0	32,894	Townsend	
4R	25 January 1947	Leicester City	H	0–0	32,112		
4R (replay)	30 January 1947	Leicester City	A	0–0	20,339		
4R (2nd replay)	3 February 1947	Leicester City	N	1–4	7,500	Scott	(Note: Match played at Villa Park, Birmingham.)

- Sources: 100 Years of Brentford, 11v11, Brentford Football Club History

== Playing squad ==
Players' ages are as of the opening day of the 1946–47 season.

Pos.	Name	Nat.	Date of birth (age)	Signed from	Signed in	Notes
Goalkeepers						
GK	Joe Crozier	(Scotland)	2 December 1914 (aged 31)	East Fife	1937	
Defenders						
DF	Bill Gorman	(Republic of Ireland)	13 January 1911 (aged 35)	Bury	1938	
DF	Frank Latimer	(England)	3 October 1923 (aged 22)	Snowdown Colliery Welfare	1945	
DF	Malky MacDonald	(Scotland)	26 October 1913 (aged 32)	Kilmarnock	1946	Coach
DF	Roddy Munro	(Scotland)	27 July 1920 (aged 26)	Rangers	1946	
DF	Harry Oliver	(England)	16 February 1921 (aged 25)	Hartlepools United	1938	
Midfielders						
HB	Wally Bragg	(England)	8 July 1929 (aged 17)	Twickenham Celtic	1946	Loaned to Hounslow Town
HB	Buster Brown	(England)	6 September 1910 (aged 35)	Huddersfield Town	1937	
HB	Tom Manley	(England)	7 October 1912 (aged 33)	Manchester United	1939	
HB	John Moore	(England)	25 September 1923 (aged 22)	Unattached	1938	
HB	George Paterson (c)	(Scotland)	26 September 1914 (aged 31)	Celtic	1946	
HB	Arthur Shaw	(England)	9 April 1924 (aged 22)	Hayes	1946	
HB	George Smith	(England)	23 April 1915 (aged 31)	Charlton Athletic	1945	
HB	Cyril Toulouse	(England)	24 December 1923 (aged 22)	St Cuthberts	1946	
Forwards						
FW	Alec Blakeman	(England)	11 June 1918 (aged 28)	Oxford City	1946	
FW	José Gallego	(Spain)	8 April 1923 (aged 23)	Cambridge City	1947	
FW	John Gillies	(Scotland)	22 October 1918 (aged 27)	St Mirren	1946	
FW	Dickie Girling	(England)	24 May 1922 (aged 24)	Crystal Palace	1947	
FW	Idris Hopkins	(Wales)	11 October 1910 (aged 35)	Crystal Palace	1932	
FW	Archie Macaulay	(Scotland)	30 July 1915 (aged 31)	West Ham United	1946	
FW	Bill Naylor	(England)	23 November 1919 (aged 26)	Crystal Palace	1947	
FW	Maurice Roberts	(England)	5 July 1922 (aged 24)	Unattached	1946	Loaned to Guildford City
FW	Billy Scott	(England)	6 December 1907 (aged 38)	Middlesbrough	1932	
FW	Alan Smith	(England)	15 October 1921 (aged 24)	Arsenal	1946	
FW	George Stewart	(Scotland)	18 October 1920 (aged 25)	Hamilton Academical	1946	
FW	Len Townsend	(England)	31 August 1917 (aged 29)	Hayes	1937	
Players who left the club mid-season
FW	Fred Durrant	(England)	19 June 1921 (aged 25)	Folkestone	1938	Transferred to Queens Park Rangers
FW	Gerry McAloon	(Scotland)	13 September 1916 (aged 29)	Wolverhampton Wanderers	1945	Transferred to Celtic
FW	George Wilkins	(England)	27 October 1919 (aged 26)	Hayes	1938	Transferred to Bradford Park Avenue

- Sources: 100 Years of Brentford, Timeless Bees, Football League Players' Records 1888 to 1939

== Coaching staff ==
Name	Role
(England) Harry Curtis	Manager
(Scotland) Jimmy Bain	Assistant Manager
(Scotland) Malky MacDonald	Coach
(England) Billy Lane	Coach
(England) Bob Kane	Trainer
(England) Jack Cartmell	Assistant Trainer

== Statistics ==
=== Appearances and goals ===

Brentford's highest appearance-makers in each position during the Football League season.

Pos	Nat	Name	League		FA Cup		Total	
Pos	Nat	Name	Apps	Goals	Apps	Goals	Apps	Goals
GK	(Scotland)	Joe Crozier	42	0	4	0	46	0
DF	(England)	Wally Bragg	1	0	0	0	1	0
DF	(Republic of Ireland)	Bill Gorman	34	0	4	0	38	0
DF	(England)	Frank Latimer	1	0	0	0	1	0
DF	(Scotland)	Malky MacDonald	16	1	0	0	16	1
DF	(Scotland)	Roddy Munro	34	0	4	0	38	0
DF	(England)	Harry Oliver	14	0	0	0	14	0
HB	(England)	Wally Bragg	1	0	0	0	1	0
HB	(England)	Buster Brown	8	0	0	0	8	0
HB	(England)	Tom Manley	9	0	0	0	9	0
HB	(England)	John Moore	2	0	0	0	2	0
HB	(Scotland)	George Paterson	27	0	4	0	31	0
HB	(England)	Arthur Shaw	4	0	0	0	4	0
HB	(England)	George Smith	41	1	4	0	45	1
HB	(England)	Cyril Toulouse	10	0	0	0	10	0
FW	(England)	Alec Blakeman	8	4	0	0	8	4
FW	(England)	Fred Durrant	4	3	—		4	3
FW	(Spain)	José Gallego	1	0	0	0	1	0
FW	(Scotland)	John Gillies	5	0	0	0	5	0
FW	(England)	Dickie Girling	15	1	—		15	1
FW	(Wales)	Idris Hopkins	39	4	4	0	43	4
FW	(Scotland)	Gerry McAloon	7	4	—		7	4
FW	(Scotland)	Archie Macaulay	26	2	4	0	30	2
FW	(England)	Bill Naylor	11	2	—		11	2
FW	(England)	Maurice Roberts	10	0	0	0	10	0
FW	(England)	Billy Scott	12	0	3	1	15	1
FW	(England)	Alan Smith	10	3	4	0	14	3
FW	(Scotland)	George Stewart	16	3	1	0	17	3
FW	(England)	Len Townsend	29	8	4	1	33	9
FW	(England)	George Wilkins	26	7	4	0	30	7

- Players listed in italics left the club mid-season.
- Source: 100 Years of Brentford

=== Goalscorers ===
Pos.	Nat	Player	FL1	FAC	Total
FW	(England)	Len Townsend	8	1	9
FW	(England)	George Wilkins	7	0	7
FW	(Scotland)	Gerry McAloon	4	—	4
FW	(England)	Alec Blakeman	4	0	4
FW	(Wales)	Idris Hopkins	4	0	4
FW	(England)	Fred Durrant	3	—	3
FW	(England)	Alan Smith	3	0	3
FW	(Scotland)	George Stewart	3	0	3
FW	(England)	Bill Naylor	2	—	2
FW	(Scotland)	Archie Macaulay	2	0	2
FW	(England)	Dickie Girling	1	—	1
DF	(Scotland)	Malky MacDonald	1	0	1
HB	(England)	George Smith	1	0	1
FW	(England)	Billy Scott	0	1	1
Opponents			2	0	2
Total			45	2	47

- Players listed in italics left the club mid-season.
- Source: 100 Years of Brentford

=== International caps ===
Pos.	Nat	Player	Caps	Goals	Ref
DF	(Republic of Ireland) (Ireland)	Bill Gorman	2; 3	0; 0	
FW	(Scotland)	Archie Macaulay	1	0	

=== Management ===
Name	Nat	From	To	Record All Comps					Record League				
Name	Nat	From	To	P	W	D	L	W %	P	W	D	L	W %
Harry Curtis	(England)	31 August 1946	14 June 1947	46	10	9	27	21.74|	42	9	7	26	21.43

=== Summary ===
Games played	46 (42 First Division, 4 FA Cup)
Games won	10 (9 First Division, 1 FA Cup)
Games drawn	9 (7 First Division, 2 FA Cup)
Games lost	27 (26 First Division, 1 FA Cup)
Goals scored	47 (45 First Division, 2 FA Cup)
Goals conceded	92 (88 First Division, 4 FA Cup)
Clean sheets	8 (5 First Division, 3 FA Cup)
Biggest league win	3–0 versus Blackburn Rovers, 1 January 1947; 4–1 versus Wolverhampton Wanderers, 18 January 1947
Worst league defeat	6–1 versus Sheffield United, 25 December 1946
Most appearances	46, Joe Crozier (42 First Division, 4 FA Cup)
Top scorer (league)	8, Len Townsend
Top scorer (all competitions)	9, Len Townsend

== Transfers & loans ==
Cricketers are not included in this list.

Players transferred in
Date	Pos.	Name	Previous club	Fee	Ref.
May 1946	FW	(England) Alec Blakeman	(England) Oxford City	Free	
May 1946	FW	(Scotland) John Gillies	(Scotland) St Mirren	Nominal	
May 1946	HB	(England) Arthur Shaw	(England) Hayes	n/a	
May 1946	HB	(England) Cyril Toulouse	(England) St Cuthberts	Free	
30 July 1946	FW	(Scotland) George Stewart	(Scotland) Hamilton Academical	n/a	
30 July 1946	FW	(Scotland) J. A. Fyffe	n/a	n/a	
23 August 1946	FW	(England) Robert Ross	(England) Murton Colliery Welfare	n/a	
August 1946	FW	(England) Maurice Roberts	Unattached	Free	
October 1946	DF	(Scotland) Malky MacDonald	(Scotland) Kilmarnock	£1,500	
October 1946	HB	(Scotland) George Paterson	(Scotland) Celtic	Exchange	
November 1946	FW	(Scotland) Archie Macaulay	(England) West Ham United	n/a	
December 1946	FW	(England) Alan Smith	(England) Arsenal	Free	
1946	HB	(England) Wally Bragg	(England) Twickenham Celtic	Amateur	
January 1947	FW	(Spain) José Gallego	(England) Cambridge City	Free	
January 1947	DF	(Scotland) William Gibson	(England) Arsenal	n/a	
10 February 1947	FW	(England) Dickie Girling	(England) Crystal Palace	n/a	
10 February 1947	FW	(England) Bill Naylor	(England) Crystal Palace	n/a	
March 1947	FW	(England) Percy Gleeson	(England) Hounslow Town	n/a	
Players transferred out
Date	Pos.	Name	Subsequent club	Fee	Ref.
19 June 1946	DF	(England) Harry Bamford	(England) Brighton & Hove Albion	n/a	
19 June 1946	FW	(England) Jim Gotts	(England) Brighton & Hove Albion	n/a	
19 June 1946	FW	(England) Albert Hammond	(England) Exeter City	n/a	
26 June 1946	HB	(England) Eric Jones	(England) Crewe Alexandra	n/a	
September 1946	FW	(England) Fred Durrant	(England) Queens Park Rangers	£4,500	
4 October 1946	FW	(Scotland) Gerry McAloon	(Scotland) Celtic	Exchange	
October 1946	DF	(England) Jimmy Anderson	(England) Carlisle United	Nominal	
10 February 1947	FW	(England) George Wilkins	(England) Bradford Park Avenue	£7,000	
February 1947	DF	(England) Fred Mansfield	(England) Norwich City	n/a	
Players loaned out
Date	Pos.	Name	Previous club	Date to	Ref.
1946	HB	(England) Wally Bragg	(England) Hounslow Town	1947	
November 1946	FW	(England) Maurice Roberts	(England) Guildford City	1947	
Players released
Date	Pos.	Name	Subsequent club	Join date	Ref.
April 1947	FW	(Wales) Les Boulter	(England) Yeovil Town	1947	
April 1947	HB	(England) Buster Brown	(England) Leyton Orient	May 1947	
April 1947	HB	Collier	n/a	n/a	
April 1947	FW	(Scotland) J. A. Fyffe	n/a	n/a	
April 1947	FW	(Scotland) John Gillies	(Scotland) Morton	1947	
April 1947	FW	(Wales) Idris Hopkins	(England) Bristol City	May 1947	
April 1947	FW	(England) Ernest Muttitt	(England) Dover	1947	
April 1947	FW	(England) Maurice Roberts	(England) Bristol City	May 1947	
April 1947	FW	T. Ryder	n/a	n/a	
April 1947	FW	(England) Billy Scott	(England) Aldershot	July 1947	
April 1947	FW	(England) John Sutton	n/a	n/a	
April 1947	FW	(England) Len Townsend	(England) Bristol City	June 1947	
