= 1947–48 Brentford F.C. season =

English football team season

Brentford
1947–48 season
- Chairman: Frank Davis
- Manager: Harry Curtis
- Stadium: Griffin Park
- Second Division: 15th
- FA Cup: Fourth round
- Top goalscorer: League: Gibbons (13); All: Gibbons (14)
- Highest home attendance: 34,500
- Lowest home attendance: 13,723
- Average home league attendance: 23,341
Home colours

During the 1947–48 English football season, Brentford competed in the Football League Second Division. In the Bees' first second-tier season since 1934–35, the club slumped to a 15th-place finish.

== Season summary ==
After relegation to the Second Division at the end of the 1946–47 season, Brentford were forced to cash in on their assets and received £16,000 from the sales of George Smith and Scotland international Archie Macaulay. No less than 14 players departed Griffin Park during the off-season, with five players coming in at a cost of nearly £20,000 – half back David Nelson and forwards Peter Buchanan, Tommy Dawson, Tommy Dougall and Jackie Gibbons, with Gibbons rejoining the club after making 11 appearances while an amateur during the 1938–39 season. After a poor start to the season, Jimmy Hogan was brought in as a coach. It was long-serving trainer Bob Kane's final season with the club.

Brentford had an awful start to the season, winning one and losing eight of the opening 9 matches to leave the club rooted to the bottom of the table. Bit-part half back Cyril Toulouse was transferred to Tottenham Hotspur in exchange for Jack Chisholm, who lead the team's recovery from the centre of the field. Just three defeats in 13 matches between late-September and mid-December 1946 finally lifted the club out of the relegation places. More players came and went in the second half of the season – Tony Harper and Fred Monk came in from non-League football, with Percy Gleeson, George Stewart and Arthur Shaw transferring out.

Brentford finished a tumultuous season in 15th place, 11 points above the relegation zone and lost just four of the final 20 matches of the league campaign. The season ended with an irksome 1–0 defeat to local rivals (and Second Division champions) Queens Park Rangers in the Ealing Hospital Cup final. The club record for fewest goalscorers in a season was equalled, with just eight players registering a goal.

== League table ==
Pos	Team	Pld	W	D	L	GF	GA	GAv	Pts
13	Luton Town	42	14	12	16	56	59	0.949	40
14	Bradford (Park Avenue)	42	16	8	18	68	72	0.944	40
15	Brentford	42	13	14	15	44	61	0.721	40
16	Chesterfield	42	16	7	19	54	55	0.982	39
17	Plymouth Argyle	42	9	20	13	40	58	0.690	38

Rules for classification: 1) Points; 2) Goal average; 3) Goals scored

== Results ==
Brentford's goal tally listed first.

=== Legend ===
Win	Draw	Loss

=== Football League Second Division ===
No.	Date	Opponent	Venue	Result	Attendance	Scorer(s)
1	23 August 1947	Fulham	A	0–5	32,823	
2	27 August 1947	Luton Town	H	0–3	17,022	
3	30 August 1947	Coventry City	H	1–4	19,107	Gibbons
4	3 September 1947	Luton Town	A	0–3	20,921	
5	6 September 1947	Newcastle United	A	0–1	56,692	
6	10 September 1947	Nottingham Forest	H	3–1	15,005	Buchanan, Nelson, Blakeman
7	13 September 1947	Birmingham City	H	1–2	25,523	Dawson
8	17 September 1947	Nottingham Forest	A	0–2	18,617	
9	20 September 1947	West Bromwich Albion	A	2–3	29,445	Buchanan, Gibbons
10	27 September 1947	Barnsley	H	3–3	22,137	Gleeson, Gibbons, Buchanan
11	4 October 1947	Plymouth Argyle	A	0–0	23,959	
12	11 October 1947	Bradford Park Avenue	H	2–1	24,682	Dawson, Girling
13	18 October 1947	Cardiff City	H	0–0	34,483	
14	25 October 1947	Sheffield Wednesday	H	1–0	29,112	Gibbons
15	1 November 1947	Tottenham Hotspur	A	0–4	42,362	
16	8 November 1947	Millwall	H	2–1	26,251	Buchanan, Girling
17	15 November 1947	Chesterfield	A	0–4	11,320	
18	22 November 1947	West Ham United	H	1–1	24,105	Dawson
19	29 November 1947	Bury	A	2–2	12,856	Dawson, Gibbons
20	6 December 1947	Southampton	H	2–2	18,735	Dawson, Nelson
21	13 December 1947	Doncaster Rovers	A	0–0	16,916	
22	20 December 1947	Fulham	H	0–2	20,717	
23	25 December 1947	Leicester City	H	2–2	21,291	Dawson (2)
24	27 December 1947	Leicester City	A	2–1	32,440	Dawson, Girling
25	3 January 1948	Coventry City	A	0–3	20,180	
26	17 January 1948	Newcastle United	H	1–0	29,684	Gibbons
27	31 January 1948	Birmingham City	A	0–0	37,542	
28	7 February 1948	West Bromwich Albion	H	1–0	25,234	Nelson
29	14 February 1948	Barnsley	A	1–1	21,399	Gibbons
30	21 February 1948	Plymouth Argyle	H	0–0	13,723	
31	28 February 1948	Bradford Park Avenue	A	1–1	11,666	Buchanan
32	6 March 1948	Cardiff City	A	0–1	41,032	
33	20 March 1948	Tottenham Hotspur	H	2–0	31,297	Buchanan, Monk
34	26 March 1948	Leeds United	H	3–0	30,538	Girling, Gibbons (2)
35	27 March 1948	Millwall	A	1–0	27,519	Monk
36	29 March 1948	Leeds United	A	1–1	26,775	Dawson
37	3 April 1948	Chesterfield	H	0–3	24,164	
38	10 April 1948	West Ham United	A	1–0	21,471	Gibbons
39	12 April 1948	Sheffield Wednesday	A	1–1	36,130	Gibbons
40	17 April 1948	Bury	H	4–1	20,419	Blakeman, Gibbons, Buchanan, Dawson
41	24 April 1948	Southampton	A	1–2	18,511	Gibbons
42	1 May 1948	Doncaster Rovers	H	2–1	16,939	Buchanan, Girling

=== FA Cup ===
Round	Date	Opponent	Venue	Result	Attendance	Scorer(s)
3R	10 January 1948	Rotherham United	A	3–0	22,000	Dawson, Gibbons, Buchanan
4R	24 January 1948	Middlesbrough	H	1–2	34,500	Girling

- Sources: Statto, 11v11, 100 Years Of Brentford

== Playing squad ==
Players' ages are as of the opening day of the 1947–48 season.

Pos.	Name	Nat.	Date of birth (age)	Signed from	Signed in	Notes
Goalkeepers						
GK	Joe Crozier	(Scotland)	2 December 1914 (aged 32)	East Fife	1937	
GK	Ted Gaskell	(England)	19 December 1916 (aged 30)	Buxton	1937	
Defenders						
DF	Bill Gorman	(Republic of Ireland)	13 January 1911 (aged 36)	Bury	1938	
DF	Malky MacDonald	(Scotland)	26 October 1913 (aged 33)	Kilmarnock	1946	
DF	Roddy Munro	(Scotland)	27 July 1920 (aged 27)	Rangers	1946	
DF	Harry Oliver	(England)	16 February 1921 (aged 26)	Hartlepools United	1938	
DF	Eric Ventom	(England)	15 February 1920 (aged 27)	Unattached	1946	
Midfielders						
HB	Jack Chisholm	(England)	9 October 1924 (aged 22)	Tottenham Hotspur	1947	
HB	Frank Latimer	(England)	3 October 1923 (aged 23)	Snowdown Colliery Welfare	1945	
HB	Tom Manley	(England)	7 October 1912 (aged 34)	Manchester United	1939	
HB	John Moore	(England)	25 September 1923 (aged 23)	Unattached	1938	
HB	David Nelson	(Scotland)	3 February 1918 (aged 28)	Fulham	1947	
HB	George Paterson (c)	(Scotland)	26 September 1914 (aged 32)	Celtic	1946	
Forwards						
FW	Alec Blakeman	(England)	11 June 1918 (aged 29)	Oxford City	1946	
FW	Peter Buchanan	(Scotland)	13 October 1915 (aged 31)	Fulham	1947	
FW	Tommy Dawson	(England)	6 February 1915 (aged 32)	Charlton Athletic	1947	
FW	Tommy Dougall	(Scotland)	17 May 1921 (aged 26)	Coventry City	1947	
FW	José Gallego	(Spain)	8 April 1923 (aged 24)	Cambridge City	1947	
FW	Jackie Gibbons	(England)	10 April 1914 (aged 33)	Bradford Park Avenue	1947	
FW	Dickie Girling	(England)	24 May 1922 (aged 25)	Crystal Palace	1947	
FW	Fred Monk	(England)	9 October 1920 (aged 26)	Guildford City	1948	
Players who left the club mid-season
HB	Cyril Toulouse	(England)	24 December 1923 (aged 23)	St Cuthberts	1946	Transferred to Tottenham Hotspur
FW	Percy Gleeson	(England)	18 July 1921 (aged 26)	Hounslow Town	1947	Transferred to Guildford City
FW	George Stewart	(Scotland)	18 October 1920 (aged 26)	Hamilton Academical	1946	Transferred to Queens Park Rangers

- Sources: 100 Years of Brentford, Timeless Bees

== Coaching staff ==
Name	Role
(England) Harry Curtis	Manager
(Scotland) Jimmy Bain	Assistant Manager
(England) Jimmy Hogan	Coach
(England) Bob Kane	Trainer
(England) Jack Cartmell	Assistant Trainer

== Statistics ==
=== Appearances and goals ===

Brentford's highest appearance-makers in each position during the Football League season.

Pos	Nat	Name	League		FA Cup		Total	
Pos	Nat	Name	Apps	Goals	Apps	Goals	Apps	Goals
GK	(Scotland)	Joe Crozier	40	0	2	0	42	0
GK	(England)	Ted Gaskell	2	0	0	0	2	0
DF	(Republic of Ireland)	Bill Gorman	17	0	2	0	19	0
DF	(Scotland)	Malky MacDonald	41	0	2	0	43	0
DF	(Scotland)	Roddy Munro	21	0	0	0	21	0
DF	(England)	Harry Oliver	4	0	0	0	4	0
DF	(England)	Eric Ventom	1	0	0	0	1	0
HB	(England)	Jack Chisholm	19	0	2	0	21	0
HB	(England)	Frank Latimer	16	0	0	0	16	0
HB	(England)	Tom Manley	27	0	2	0	29	0
HB	(England)	John Moore	2	0	0	0	2	0
HB	(Scotland)	David Nelson	40	3	2	0	42	3
HB	(Scotland)	George Paterson	26	0	0	0	26	0
HB	(England)	Cyril Toulouse	3	0	—		3	0
FW	(England)	Alec Blakeman	25	2	2	0	27	2
FW	(Scotland)	Peter Buchanan	40	8	2	1	42	9
FW	(England)	Tommy Dawson	36	10	2	1	38	11
FW	(Scotland)	Tommy Dougall	2	0	0	0	2	0
FW	(Spain)	José Gallego	5	0	0	0	5	0
FW	(England)	Jackie Gibbons	41	13	2	1	43	14
FW	(England)	Dickie Girling	33	5	2	1	35	6
FW	(England)	Percy Gleeson	9	1	0	0	9	1
FW	(England)	Fred Monk	4	2	—		4	2
FW	(Scotland)	George Stewart	8	0	0	0	8	0

- Players listed in italics left the club mid-season.
- Source: 100 Years Of Brentford

=== Goalscorers ===
Pos.	Nat	Player	FL2	FAC	Total
FW	(England)	Jackie Gibbons	13	1	14
FW	(England)	Tommy Dawson	10	1	11
FW	(Scotland)	Peter Buchanan	8	1	9
FW	(England)	Dickie Girling	5	1	6
HB	(Scotland)	David Nelson	3	0	3
FW	(England)	Alec Blakeman	2	0	2
FW	(England)	Fred Monk	2	0	2
FW	(England)	Percy Gleeson	1	0	1
Total			44	4	48

- Players listed in italics left the club mid-season.
- Source: 100 Years Of Brentford

=== Management ===
Name	Nat	From	To	Record All Comps					Record League				
Name	Nat	From	To	P	W	D	L	W %	P	W	D	L	W %
Harry Curtis	(England)	23 August 1947	1 May 1948	44	14	14	16	31.82	42	13	14	15	30.95

=== Summary ===
Games played	44 (42 Second Division, 2 FA Cup)
Games won	14 (13 Second Division, 1 FA Cup)
Games drawn	14 (14 Second Division, 0 FA Cup)
Games lost	16 (15 Second Division, 1 FA Cup)
Goals scored	48 (44 Second Division, 4 FA Cup)
Goals conceded	63 (61 Second Division, 2 FA Cup)
Clean sheets	13 (12 Second Division, 1 FA Cup)
Biggest league win	3–0 versus Leeds United, 26 March 1948; 4–1 versus Bury, 17 April 1948
Worst league defeat	5–0 versus Fulham, 23 August 1947
Most appearances	46, Jackie Gibbons, Malky MacDonald (41 Second Division, 2 FA Cup)
Top scorer (league)	13, Jackie Gibbons
Top scorer (all competitions)	14, Jackie Gibbons

== Transfers & loans ==
Cricketers are not included in this list.

Players transferred in
Date	Pos.	Name	Previous club	Fee	Ref.
June 1947	HB	R. Goddard	n/a	n/a	
11 August 1947	FW	(England) Jackie Gibbons	(England) Bradford Park Avenue	£8,000	
13 August 1947	FW	(Scotland) Tommy Dougall	(England) Coventry City	n/a	
August 1947	FW	(Scotland) Peter Buchanan	(England) Fulham	£3,000	
August 1947	n/a	(Scotland) Tommy Connors	n/a	n/a	
August 1947	FW	(England) Tommy Dawson	(England) Charlton Athletic	£5,000	
August 1947	HB	(Scotland) David Nelson	(England) Fulham	£3,000	
August 1947	n/a	(England) Les Smith	n/a	n/a	
October 1947	HB	(England) Jack Chisholm	(England) Tottenham Hotspur	Exchange	
March 1948	FW	(England) Fred Monk	(England) Guildford City	Exchange	
April 1948	WH	Bernard Gardner	n/a	n/a	
April 1948	HB	(England) Tony Harper	(England) Headington United	n/a	
1948	FW	Connors	(England) Wembley	n/a	
Players transferred out
Date	Pos.	Name	Subsequent club	Fee	Ref.
15 May 1947	GK	(England) Frank Clack	(England) Bristol City	£1,500	
4 June 1947	FW	(England) Bill Naylor	(England) Leyton Orient	£2,000	
June 1947	HB	(England) George Smith	(England) Queens Park Rangers	£6,000	
July 1947	FW	(Scotland) Archie Macaulay	(England) Arsenal	£10,000	
October 1947	HB	(England) Cyril Toulouse	(England) Tottenham Hotspur	Exchange	
March 1948	FW	(Scotland) George Stewart	(England) Queens Park Rangers	£4,000	
14 April 1948	HB	(England) Arthur Shaw	(England) Arsenal	n/a	
April 1948	FW	(England) Percy Gleeson	(England) Guildford City	Exchange	
Players released
Date	Pos.	Name	Subsequent club	Join date	Ref.
May 1948	FW	Connors	n/a	n/a	
May 1948	FW	(Spain) José Gallego	(England) Southampton	May 1948	
May 1948	HB	R. Goddard	n/a	n/a	
May 1948	HB	(England) John Moore	(England) Gloucester City	1948	
May 1948	DF	(England) Eric Ventom	Retired		
