= 1948–49 Brentford F.C. season =

English football team season

Brentford
1948–49 season
- Chairman: Frank Davis
- Manager: Harry Curtis (until 14 February 1949); Jackie Gibbons (from 15 February 1949)
- Stadium: Griffin Park
- Second Division: 18th
- FA Cup: Sixth round
- Top goalscorer: League: Monk (11); All: Monk (13)
- Highest home attendance: 38,678
- Lowest home attendance: 14,360
- Average home league attendance: 22,755
Home colours

During the 1948–49 English football season, Brentford competed in the Football League Second Division. It was Harry Curtis' final season as manager and he was replaced by Jackie Gibbons in February 1949. Brentford ended the season in 18th-place, just one point away from a second relegation in three seasons, though the Bees advanced to the sixth round of the FA Cup for the third time in the club's history.

== Season summary ==
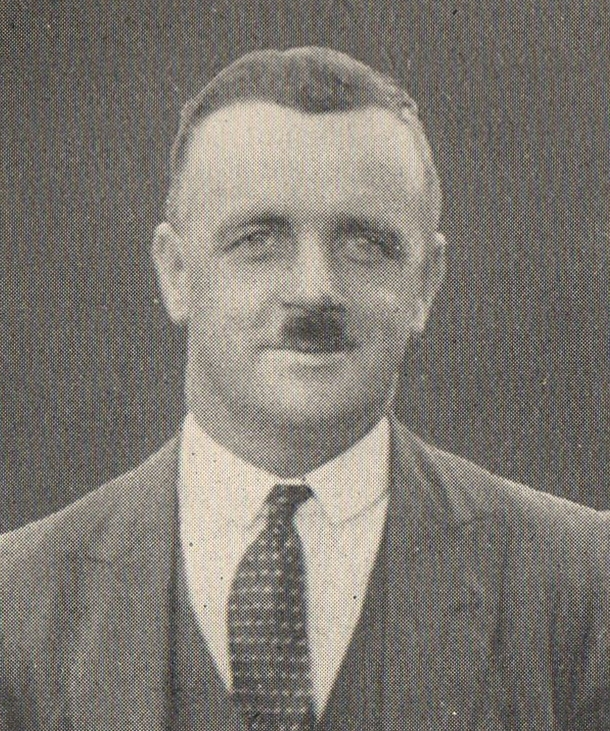
1948–49 was Harry Curtis' 24th and final season as Brentford manager.

Brentford manager Harry Curtis prepared conservatively for the 1948–49 Second Division season, with inside forward Viv Woodward and wing half Paddy Harris being his only veteran additions to the first team squad. The Essential Work Order made it almost impossible for the Bees to sign any player aged under 30, due to the club having spent £28,300 (almost double the club's net income, equivalent to £889,700 in 2025) on six new players during the previous financial year, with only Jack Chisholm and Fred Monk aged under 30. Curtis elected to build for the future with the signings of young players Les Devonshire, Jimmy Anders, Micky Bull and Billy Dare, but Dare was the only one of the quartet who would go on to make an impact on the first team. On the eve of the season, it was announced that Curtis would step down from the manager's position at the end of the campaign.

After two wins from the opening seven matches, Curtis signed Leicester City forward Peter McKennan for £8,000. He failed to have an immediate effect on the team's goalscoring problems, but Brentford were able to stay afloat in mid-table due to the low number of goals conceded. Amidst a dire run of form in league matches around the turn of the year, McKennan finally came into form and scored 9 goals in a seven-match spell, firing Brentford into the sixth round of the FA Cup for the second time in four seasons. In the midst of the run was an 8–2 victory over Bury, in which McKennan became the third (and as of June 2026, most recent) Brentford player to score five goals in a Football League match. The Bury fixture also marked the first match in charge for player-manager Jackie Gibbons, having replaced Harry Curtis, who remained at Griffin Park until the end of the season as an adviser to Gibbons. Brentford's FA Cup run ended with defeat to Leicester City in the sixth round, with the 38,678 crowd setting a new club record, which still stands as of June 2026.

Brentford's form deserted them in the wake of the FA Cup exit, with just two victories during the remaining 14 league matches of the season. Centre half Ron Greenwood was bought from Bradford Park Avenue for £9,000 in February 1949, with all of the money being recouped following the sale of captain Jack Chisholm to Sheffield United for £16,000 a month later. Advanced preparations for the 1949–50 season continued in April, with the £7,000 purchase of Jackie Goodwin and Wally Quinton from Birmingham City. Brentford slumped to an 18th-place finish, just one point above 21st-place Nottingham Forest. Young forward Billy Dare was blooded in the final two months of the season and showed promise for the future with four goals in the final six matches.

== League table ==
Pos	Team	Pld	W	D	L	GF	GA	GAv	Pts
16	Coventry City	42	15	7	20	55	64	0.859	37
17	Bradford (Park Avenue)	42	13	11	18	65	78	0.833	37
18	Brentford	42	11	14	17	42	53	0.792	36
19	Leicester City	42	10	16	16	62	79	0.785	36
20	Plymouth Argyle	42	12	12	18	49	64	0.766	36

Rules for classification: 1) Points; 2) Goal average; 3) Goals scored

== Results ==
Brentford's goal tally listed first.

=== Legend ===
Win	Draw	Loss

=== Football League Second Division ===
No.	Date	Opponent	Venue	Result	Attendance	Scorer(s)
1	21 August 1948	Coventry City	H	2–2	26,090	Nelson, Monk
2	25 August 1948	Leeds United	A	0–0	26,625	
3	28 August 1948	Sheffield Wednesday	A	0–0	35,116	
4	1 September 1948	Leeds United	H	1–3	19,212	Woodward
5	4 September 1948	Lincoln City	H	2–1	22,414	Manley, Girling
6	6 September 1948	Leicester City	A	0–0	24,151	
7	11 September 1948	Chesterfield	A	1–0	11,057	Girling
8	15 September 1948	Leicester City	H	1–2	17,986	Buchanan
9	18 September 1948	West Bromwich Albion	H	0–0	28,212	
10	25 September 1948	Bury	A	2–1	22,473	Monk (2)
11	2 October 1948	West Ham United	A	0–0	31,369	
12	9 October 1948	Queens Park Rangers	A	0–2	25,814	
13	16 October 1948	Luton Town	H	2–0	23,211	Gibbons, Buchanan
14	23 October 1948	Bradford Park Avenue	A	1–3	14,906	Blakeman
15	30 October 1948	Southampton	H	0–0	29,887	
16	6 November 1948	Barnsley	A	2–1	20,883	Nelson (pen), Monk
17	13 November 1948	Grimsby Town	H	2–0	24,992	Keene, Monk
18	20 November 1948	Nottingham Forest	A	2–1	19,278	Gibbons, Monk
19	4 December 1948	Plymouth Argyle	A	0–1	25,611	
20	11 December 1948	Blackburn Rovers	H	0–1	21,421	
21	18 December 1948	Coventry City	A	1–2	21,280	Manley
22	25 December 1948	Cardiff City	H	1–1	22,813	Monk
23	27 December 1948	Cardiff City	A	0–2	49,236	
24	1 January 1949	Sheffield Wednesday	H	2–1	16,753	Buchanan, Monk
25	15 January 1949	Lincoln City	A	1–3	13,125	McKennan
26	22 January 1949	Chesterfield	H	1–1	25,549	Monk
27	5 February 1949	West Bromwich Albion	A	0–2	39,482	
28	19 February 1949	Bury	H	8–2	23,249	McKennan (5, 1 pen), Gibbons, Monk
29	5 March 1949	Queens Park Rangers	H	0–3	29,420	
30	12 March 1949	Luton Town	A	1–2	16,682	Chisholm
31	19 March 1949	Bradford Park Avenue	H	1–0	18,413	Manley (pen)
32	26 March 1949	Southampton	A	0–2	25,217	
33	2 April 1949	Barnsley	H	0–0	18,485	
34	6 April 1949	Fulham	H	0–0	29,160	
35	9 April 1949	Grimsby Town	A	0–3	15,695	
36	15 April 1949	Tottenham Hotspur	A	0–2	39,050	
37	16 April 1949	Nottingham Forest	H	2–1	15,857	Gager (og), Dare
38	18 April 1949	Tottenham Hotspur	H	1–1	19,004	Dare
39	23 April 1949	Fulham	A	1–2	39,149	Dare
40	25 April 1949	West Ham United	A	1–1	15,553	Smith
41	30 April 1949	Plymouth Argyle	H	2–2	14,360	Buchanan (2)
42	7 May 1949	Blackburn Rovers	A	1–2	15,453	Gray (og), Dare

=== FA Cup ===
Round	Date	Opponent	Venue	Result	Attendance	Scorer(s)
3R	8 January 1949	Middlesbrough	H	3–2 (a.e.t.)	30,000	Harper, Monk, McKennan
4R	29 January 1949	Torquay United	H	1–0	24,500	McKennan
5R	12 February 1949	Burnley	H	4–2	34,000	McKennan (2), Gibbons, Monk
6R	26 February 1949	Leicester City	H	0–2	38,678	

- Sources: Statto, 11v11, 100 Years Of Brentford

== Playing squad ==
Players' ages are as of the opening day of the 1948–49 season.

Pos.	Name	Nat.	Date of birth (age)	Signed from	Signed in	Notes
Goalkeepers						
GK	Joe Crozier	(Scotland)	2 December 1914 (aged 33)	East Fife	1937	
GK	Ted Gaskell	(England)	19 December 1916 (aged 31)	Buxton	1937	
Defenders						
DF	Bill Gorman	(Republic of Ireland)	13 January 1911 (aged 37)	Bury	1938	
DF	Malky MacDonald	(Scotland)	26 October 1913 (aged 34)	Kilmarnock	1946	Coach
DF	Roddy Munro	(Scotland)	27 July 1920 (aged 28)	Rangers	1946	
DF	Wally Quinton	(England)	13 December 1917 (aged 30)	Birmingham City	1949	
Midfielders						
HB	Ron Greenwood	(England)	11 November 1921 (aged 26)	Bradford Park Avenue	1949	
HB	Tom Manley	(England)	7 October 1912 (aged 35)	Manchester United	1939	
HB	David Nelson	(Scotland)	3 February 1918 (aged 30)	Fulham	1947	
HB	George Paterson	(Scotland)	26 September 1914 (aged 33)	Celtic	1946	
HB	Alan Smith	(England)	15 October 1921 (aged 26)	Arsenal	1946	
Forwards						
FW	Peter Buchanan	(Scotland)	13 October 1915 (aged 32)	Fulham	1947	
FW	Billy Dare	(England)	14 February 1927 (aged 21)	Hendon	1948	
FW	Jackie Gibbons	(England)	10 April 1914 (aged 34)	Bradford Park Avenue	1947	Manager
FW	Dickie Girling	(England)	24 May 1922 (aged 26)	Crystal Palace	1947	
FW	Tony Harper	(England)	26 May 1925 (aged 23)	Headington United	1948	
FW	Peter McKennan	(Scotland)	16 July 1918 (aged 30)	Leicester City	1948	
FW	Doug Keene	(England)	30 August 1928 (aged 19)	Kingsbury Town	1946	
FW	Fred Monk	(England)	9 October 1920 (aged 27)	Guildford City	1948	
FW	Viv Woodward	(Wales)	25 May 1914 (aged 34)	Millwall	1948	
Players who left the club mid-season
HB	Jack Chisholm (c)	(England)	9 October 1924 (aged 23)	Tottenham Hotspur	1947	Transferred to Sheffield United
HB	Paddy Harris	(Republic of Ireland)	20 February 1918 (aged 30)	Notts County	1948	Released
FW	Alec Blakeman	(England)	11 June 1918 (aged 30)	Oxford City	1946	Transferred to Sheffield United

- Sources: 100 Years of Brentford, Timeless Bees

== Coaching staff ==
=== Harry Curtis (21 August 1948 – 14 February 1949) ===
Name	Role
(England) Harry Curtis	Manager
(Scotland) Jimmy Bain	Assistant Manager
(Scotland) Malky MacDonald	Trainer-Coach
(England) Jack Cartmell	Trainer

=== Jackie Gibbons (15 February – 7 May 1949) ===
Name	Role
(England) Jackie Gibbons	Manager
(Scotland) Jimmy Bain	Assistant Manager
(Scotland) Malky MacDonald	Coach
(England) Jack Cartmell	Trainer
(England) Harry Curtis	Advisory Manager

== Statistics ==
=== Appearances and goals ===

Brentford's highest appearance-makers in each position during the Football League season.

Pos	Nat	Name	League		FA Cup		Total	
Pos	Nat	Name	Apps	Goals	Apps	Goals	Apps	Goals
GK	(Scotland)	Joe Crozier	41	0	4	0	45	0
GK	(England)	Ted Gaskell	1	0	0	0	1	0
DF	(Republic of Ireland)	Bill Gorman	42	0	4	0	46	0
DF	(Scotland)	Malky MacDonald	30	0	4	0	34	0
DF	(Scotland)	Roddy Munro	13	0	0	0	13	0
DF	(England)	Wally Quinton	1	0	—		1	0
HB	(England)	Jack Chisholm	30	1	4	0	34	1
HB	(England)	Ron Greenwood	12	0	—		12	0
HB	(Republic of Ireland)	Paddy Harris	4	0	—		4	0
HB	(England)	Tom Manley	42	3	4	0	46	3
HB	(Scotland)	David Nelson	40	2	4	0	44	2
HB	(Scotland)	George Paterson	6	0	0	0	6	0
HB	(England)	Alan Smith	3	1	0	0	3	1
FW	(England)	Alec Blakeman	9	1	—		9	1
FW	(Scotland)	Peter Buchanan	34	5	4	0	38	5
FW	(England)	Billy Dare	13	4	0	0	13	4
FW	(England)	Jackie Gibbons	15	3	2	1	17	4
FW	(England)	Dickie Girling	24	2	2	0	26	2
FW	(England)	Tony Harper	19	0	2	1	21	1
FW	(England)	Doug Keene	12	1	2	0	14	1
FW	(Scotland)	Peter McKennan	24	6	4	3	28	9
FW	(England)	Fred Monk	37	11	4	2	41	13
FW	(Wales)	Viv Woodward	10	1	0	0	10	1

- Players listed in italics left the club mid-season.
- Source: 100 Years Of Brentford

=== Goalscorers ===
Pos.	Nat	Player	FL2	FAC	Total
FW	(England)	Fred Monk	11	2	13
FW	(Scotland)	Peter McKennan	6	3	9
FW	(Scotland)	Peter Buchanan	5	0	5
FW	(England)	Billy Dare	4	0	4
FW	(England)	Jackie Gibbons	3	1	4
HB	(England)	Tom Manley	3	0	3
FW	(England)	Dickie Girling	2	0	2
HB	(Scotland)	David Nelson	2	0	2
FW	(England)	Alec Blakeman	1	—	1
HB	(England)	Jack Chisholm	1	0	1
FW	(England)	Doug Keene	1	0	1
HB	(England)	Alan Smith	1	0	1
FW	(Wales)	Viv Woodward	1	0	1
FW	(England)	Tony Harper	0	1	1
Opponents			2	0	2
Total			42	8	50

- Players listed in italics left the club mid-season.
- Source: 100 Years Of Brentford

=== Management ===
Name	Nat	From	To	Record All Comps					Record League				
Name	Nat	From	To	P	W	D	L	W %	P	W	D	L	W %
Harry Curtis	(England)	21 August 1948	14 February 1949	30	11	9	10	36.67	27	8	9	10	29.63
Jackie Gibbons	(England)	15 February 1949	7 May 1949	16	3	5	8	18.75	15	3	5	7	20.00

=== Summary ===
Games played	46 (42 Second Division, 4 FA Cup)
Games won	14 (11 Second Division, 3 FA Cup)
Games drawn	14 (14 Second Division, 0 FA Cup)
Games lost	18 (17 Second Division, 1 FA Cup)
Goals scored	50 (42 Second Division, 8 FA Cup)
Goals conceded	59 (53 Second Division, 6 FA Cup)
Clean sheets	17 (16 Second Division, 1 FA Cup)
Biggest league win	8–2 versus Bury, 19 February 1949
Worst league defeat	3–0 on two occasions
Most appearances	46, Bill Gorman, Tom Manley (42 Second Division, 4 FA Cup)
Top scorer (league)	11, Fred Monk
Top scorer (all competitions)	13, Fred Monk

== Transfers & loans ==
Cricketers are not included in this list.

Players transferred in
Date	Pos.	Name	Previous club	Fee	Ref.
1 May 1948	FW	(England) Les Devonshire	(England) Queens Park Rangers	n/a	
July 1948	FW	(Ireland) Ron Brown	(England) Blackburn Rovers	n/a	
July 1948	HB	(Republic of Ireland) Paddy Harris	(England) Notts County	n/a	
July 1948	FW	(Wales) Viv Woodward	(England) Millwall	Free	
August 1948	n/a	(England) Ray Jefferies	(England) Oxford City	n/a	
September 1948	FW	(England) Jimmy Anders	(England) Preston North End	n/a	
September 1948	FW	(England) Micky Bull	n/a	n/a	
September 1948	FW	(Scotland) Peter McKennan	(England) Leicester City	£8,000	
19 November 1948	FW	(England) Billy Dare	(England) Hendon	n/a	
1948	FW	(England) Jim Towers	n/a	n/a	
February 1949	HB	(England) Ron Greenwood	(England) Bradford Park Avenue	£9,000	
May 1949	FW	(England) Ken Coote	(England) Wembley	Amateur	
29 April 1949	FW	(England) Jackie Goodwin	(England) Birmingham City	£3,500	
5 May 1949	DF	(England) Wally Quinton	(England) Birmingham City	£3,500	
Players transferred out
Date	Pos.	Name	Subsequent club	Fee	Ref.
19 May 1948	FW	(England) Tommy Dawson	(England) Swindon Town	£7,000	
May 1948	DF	(England) Harry Oliver	(England) Watford	£2,000	
September 1948	n/a	(Scotland) Tommy Connors	(Scotland) Celtic	n/a	
November 1948	FW	(England) Alec Blakeman	(England) Middlesbrough	n/a	
November 1948	FW	(Scotland) Tommy Dougall	(England) Sunderland	n/a	
March 1949	HB	(England) Jack Chisholm	(England) Sheffield United	£16,000	
Players released
Date	Pos.	Name	Subsequent club	Join date	Ref.
1949	HB	(Republic of Ireland) Paddy Harris	Retired		
May 1949	FW	(Scotland) Peter Buchanan	(England) Headington United	1949	
May 1949	GK	(Scotland) Joe Crozier	(England) Chelmsford City	1949	
May 1949	FW	(England) Les Devonshire	(England) Wealdstone	1949	
May 1949	FW	(England) Jackie Gibbons	Retired		
May 1949	FW	(England) Robert Sherwood	(England) Queens Park Rangers	May 1949	
