= 1945–46 Brentford F.C. season =

English football team season

Brentford
1945–46 season
- Chairman: Frank Davis
- Manager: Harry Curtis
- Stadium: Griffin Park
- Football League South: 14th
- FA Cup: Sixth round
- Top goalscorer: League: McAloon (17); Thomas (17); All: McAloon (23)
- Highest home attendance: 36,000
- Lowest home attendance: 7,050
- Average home league attendance: 25,768
Home colours

During the 1945–46 English football season, Brentford competed in the Football League South, due to the cessation of competitive league football for one further season following the end of the Second World War in Europe in May 1945. A return to competitive cup football came in the form of the first FA Cup staged since before the war, with the Bees advancing to the sixth round and equalling the club record.

== Season summary ==
Though the Second World War ended in Europe in May 1945, the first post-war football season would be played in the regionalised wartime format, due to players continuing to be dispersed on service around the world. Brentford again began the season with a shortage of first team players, though full back Bill Gorman would go on to be an ever-present, while centre half Buster Brown, outside forward Idris Hopkins and goalkeeper Joe Crozier would all miss just a handful of games each.

Just two defeats in the opening two Football League South games gave way to a downturn in form, which was not helped by the departure of misfiring former England international forward Les Smith to Aston Villa in October 1945. Pre-war forward Tommy Cheetham also left Griffin Park, so manager Harry Curtis strengthened the attack by re-signing Gerry McAloon from Wolverhampton Wanderers. Further signings came in the form of experienced half backs George Smith and Eric Jones. With excitement hard to come by in league play, Brentford's attention turned to the first FA Cup competition held since the 1938–39 season. Entering in the third round, the Bees battled through to the sixth round, equalling the club record, with Gerry McAloon scoring six goals in the eight matches played. With the return of competitive First Division football looming, a number of amateurs were trialled during the season, with future regulars Alf Jefferies, Frank Latimer and Roddy Munro all going on to sign professional contracts.

Former Brentford wartime guest player Albert Bonass was serving in the Royal Air Force and was killed when his Short Stirling, on a training flight, crashed in the village of Tockwith, North Yorkshire on 9 October 1945.

== League table ==
Pos	Team	Pld	W	D	L	GF	GA	GR	Pts
12	Millwall	42	17	8	17	79	105	0.752	42
13	Coventry City	42	15	10	17	70	69	1.014	40
14	Brentford	42	14	10	18	82	72	1.139	38
15	Nottingham Forest	42	12	13	17	72	73	0.986	37
16	Southampton	42	14	9	19	97	105	0.924	37

Source: rsssf.com and War Hammers II

== Results ==
Brentford's goal tally listed first.

=== Legend ===
Win	Draw	Loss

=== Football League South ===
No.	Date	Opponent	Venue	Result	Attendance	Scorer(s)
1	25 August 1945	Newport County	H	2–1	13,980	Sloan, Townsend
2	1 September 1945	Newport County	A	5–0	8,862	Thomas (2), Sloan, Townsend (2)
3	6 September 1945	Leicester City	H	1–2	11,620	Sloan
4	8 September 1945	Wolverhampton Wanderers	A	0–1	20,000	
5	13 September 1945	Derby County	H	0–0	11,050	
6	15 September 1945	Wolverhampton Wanderers	A	0–0	20,080	
7	22 September 1945	West Ham United	H	1–1	18,800	Thomas
8	29 September 1945	West Ham United	A	2–0	23,000	Sloan, Durrant
9	6 October 1945	West Bromwich Albion	A	4–3	28,000	Thomas (2), Tranter (og), Hunt
10	13 October 1945	West Bromwich Albion	H	2–0	20,160	Durrant (2)
11	20 October 1945	Birmingham City	H	2–1	20,690	Wilkins (2)
12	27 October 1945	Birmingham City	A	0–1	35,000	
13	3 November 1945	Tottenham Hotspur	A	0–1	28,000	
14	10 November 1945	Tottenham Hotspur	H	1–3	19,269	Thomas
15	17 November 1945	Swansea Town	A	1–4	21,000	Roberts
16	24 November 1945	Swansea Town	H	2–2	12,090	Durrant, Hunt
17	1 December 1945	Chelsea	H	4–4	28,170	Townsend (2), Durrant (2)
18	8 December 1945	Chelsea	A	2–4	40,000	Durrant, Thomas
19	15 December 1945	Millwall	H	7–0	16,190	Thomas, Townsend (4), Watson, Durrant
20	22 December 1945	Millwall	A	1–3	22,000	Townsend
21	25 December 1945	Southampton	H	1–4	14,350	McAloon
22	26 December 1945	Southampton	A	4–3	20,000	Townsend (2), McAloon, Thomas
23	29 December 1945	Derby County	A	2–3	22,751	McAloon, Durrant
24	12 January 1946	Coventry City	A	0–1	13,450	
25	19 January 1946	Coventry City	H	1–2	10,300	Metcalf (og)
26	2 February 1946	Luton Town	A	4–1	8,348	Durrant, Gotts, Scott, Townsend
27	16 February 1946	Aston Villa	H	0–1	27,100	
28	23 February 1946	Arsenal	H	6–3	22,250	Thomas (3, 1 pen), Durrant, McAloon, Bamford
29	16 March 1946	Charlton Athletic	H	1–1	14,900	McAloon
30	23 March 1946	Fulham	H	1–2	23,400	McAloon
31	30 March 1946	Fulham	A	2–2	27,475	Thomas, Townsend
32	6 April 1946	Plymouth Argyle	A	1–1	20,000	McAloon
33	10 April 1946	Charlton Athletic	A	3–4	20,000	Thomas (3)
34	13 April 1946	Plymouth Argyle	H	3–2	13,200	G. Smith, Thomas, McAloon
35	17 April 1946	Aston Villa	A	1–1	n/a	McAloon
36	19 April 1946	Portsmouth	H	0–2	16,184	
37	20 April 1946	Nottingham Forest	A	0–2	19,704	
38	22 April 1946	Portsmouth	A	0–2	20,000	
39	24 April 1946	Luton Town	H	6–1	7,050	McAloon (3), Durrant, Edelston, Jones
40	27 April 1946	Nottingham Forest	H	5–1	8,140	Scott (2), McAloon (3, 1 pen)
41	29 April 1946	Arsenal	A	1–1	5,250	Scott
42	4 May 1946	Leicester City	A	3–1	10,000	Durrant, McAloon (2)

=== FA Cup ===
Round	Date	Opponent	Venue	Result	Attendance	Scorer(s)
3R (1st leg)	5 January 1946	Tottenham Hotspur	A	2–2	30,202	Durrant, Thomas
3R (2nd leg)	10 January 1946	Tottenham Hotspur	H	2–0 (won 4–2 on aggregate)	21,050	Hopkins (2)
4R (1st leg)	26 January 1946	Bristol City	A	1–2	35,684	Townsend
4R (2nd leg)	31 January 1946	Bristol City	H	5–0 (won 6–2 on aggregate)	18,000	McAloon (3), Guy (og), Durrant
5R (1st leg)	9 February 1946	Queens Park Rangers	A	3–1	19,855	McAloon, Durrant, Hopkins
5R (2nd leg)	14 February 1946	Queens Park Rangers	H	0–0 (won 3–1 on aggregate)	20,000	
6R (1st leg)	2 March 1946	Charlton Athletic	A	3–6	40,060	McAloon (2), Durrant
6R (2nd leg)	6 March 1946	Charlton Athletic	H	1–3 (lost 4–9 on aggregate)	36,000	Scott

- Sources: 100 Years Of Brentford, Statto, 11v11

== Playing squad ==
Players' ages are as of the opening day of the 1945–46 season.

Pos.	Name	Nat.	Date of birth (age)	Signed from	Signed in	Notes
Goalkeepers
GK	Joe Crozier	(Scotland)	2 December 1914 (aged 30)	East Fife	1937	
GK	Ted Gaskell	(England)	19 December 1916 (aged 28)	Buxton	1937	
Defenders
DF	Bill Gorman	(Republic of Ireland)	13 January 1911 (aged 34)	Bury	1938	
DF	Roddy Munro	(Scotland)	27 July 1920 (aged 25)	Rangers	1946	Amateur, guest for Colchester United
DF	Harry Oliver	(England)	16 February 1921 (aged 24)	Hartlepools United	1938	Guest for Leeds United and York City
Midfielders						
HB	Buster Brown	(England)	6 September 1910 (aged 34)	Huddersfield Town	1937	
HB	Bob Coulson	(England)	n/a	Unattached	1945	Amateur
HB	Albert Hammond	(England)	5 February 1924 (aged 21)	Queens Park Rangers	1944	
HB	Tom Manley	(England)	7 October 1912 (aged 32)	Manchester United	1939	
HB	Billy Scott	(England)	6 December 1907 (aged 37)	Middlesbrough	1932	
HB	George Smith	(England)	23 April 1915 (aged 30)	Charlton Athletic	1945	
Forwards
FW	Harry Bamford	(England)	8 April 1914 (aged 31)	Hayes	1936	Guest for Colchester United
FW	Johnny Baynham	(Wales)	21 April 1918 (aged 27)	Youth	1939	Guest for Clapton Orient
FW	Les Boulter	(Wales)	31 August 1913 (aged 31)	Charlton Athletic	1939	
FW	Fred Durrant	(England)	19 June 1921 (aged 24)	Folkestone	1938	
FW	Jim Gotts	(England)	17 January 1917 (aged 28)	Ashington	1945	Guest for Colchester United
FW	Eric Jones	(England)	15 February 1915 (aged 30)	West Bromwich Albion	1945	
FW	Idris Hopkins	(Wales)	11 October 1910 (aged 34)	Crystal Palace	1932	Guest for West Ham United
FW	Doug Keene	(England)	30 August 1928 (aged 16)	Kingsbury Town	1946	Amateur
FW	Gerry McAloon	(Scotland)	13 September 1916 (aged 28)	Wolverhampton Wanderers	1945	
FW	Ernest Muttitt	(England)	24 July 1908 (aged 37)	Middlesbrough	1932	Guest for Colchester United and Luton Town
FW	Maurice Roberts	(England)	5 July 1922 (aged 23)	Unattached	1946	
FW	Roy Stroud	(England)	16 March 1925 (aged 20)	Golders Green	1945	Amateur
FW	John Sutton	(England)	n/a	Unattached	1945	Guest for Bristol City and Colchester United
FW	Len Townsend	(England)	31 August 1917 (aged 27)	Hayes	1937	Guest for Colchester United
FW	George Wilkins	(England)	27 October 1919 (aged 25)	Hayes	1939	
Players who left the club mid-season
DF	George Poyser	(England)	6 February 1910 (aged 35)	Port Vale	1934	Transferred to Plymouth Argyle
FW	Les Smith	(England)	13 March 1918 (aged 27)	Petersham	1934	Guest for Queens Park Rangers; Transferred to Aston Villa
FW	Bob Thomas	(England)	2 August 1919 (aged 26)	Golders Green	1944	Transferred to Plymouth Argyle
Guest players
GK	Johnny Mapson	(England)	2 May 1917 (aged 28)	Sunderland	1945	Guest from Sunderland
DF	Harry Ferrier	(Scotland)	20 May 1920 (aged 25)	Barnsley	1945	Guest from Barnsley
HB	Ted Fenton	(England)	7 November 1914 (aged 30)	West Ham United	1945	Guest from West Ham United
HB	Willie Phillips	(Scotland)	15 February 1911 (aged 34)	Heart of Midlothian	1945	Guest from Heart of Midlothian
HB	Bill Whittaker	(England)	20 December 1922 (aged 22)	Charlton Athletic	1945	Guest from Charlton Athletic
HB	Ron Wilson	(England)	10 September 1924 (aged 20)	West Ham United	1946	Guest from West Ham United
FW	Maurice Edelston	(England)	27 April 1918 (aged 27)	Reading	1946	Amateur, guest from Reading
FW	Douglas Hunt	(England)	19 May 1914 (aged 31)	Sheffield Wednesday	1945	Guest from Sheffield Wednesday
FW	Paddy Sloan	(Ireland)	30 April 1920 (aged 25)	Tranmere Rovers	1945	Guest from Tranmere Rovers
FW	Willie Watson	(England)	7 March 1920 (aged 25)	Huddersfield Town	1945	Guest from Huddersfield Town

- Sources: 100 Years Of Brentford, Timeless Bees, Football League Players' Records 1888 to 1939

== Coaching staff ==
Name	Role
(England) Harry Curtis	Manager
(Scotland) Jimmy Bain	Assistant manager
(England) Bob Kane	Trainer
(England) Jack Cartmell	Assistant trainer

== Statistics ==
=== Appearances and goals ===

Brentford's highest appearance-makers in each position during the Football League South season.

Pos	Nat	Name	League		FA Cup		Total	
Pos	Nat	Name	Apps	Goals	Apps	Goals	Apps	Goals
GK	(Scotland)	Joe Crozier	35	0	8	0	43	0
GK	(England)	Ted Gaskell	1	0	—		1	0
DF	(Republic of Ireland)	Bill Gorman	42	0	8	0	50	0
DF	(Scotland)	Roddy Munro	5	0	—		5	0
DF	(England)	Harry Oliver	7	0	2	0	9	0
DF	(England)	George Poyser	26	0	3	0	29	0
HB	(England)	Buster Brown	41	0	8	0	49	0
HB	(England)	Bob Coulson	1	0	—		1	0
HB	(England)	Albert Hammond	1	0	—		1	0
HB	(England)	Tom Manley	2	0	—		2	0
HB	(England)	Billy Scott	31	4	8	1	39	5
HB	(England)	George Smith	25	1	7	0	32	1
FW	(England)	Harry Bamford	1	1	2	0	3	1
FW	(Wales)	Johnny Baynham	7	0	—		7	0
FW	(Wales)	Les Boulter	1	0	—		1	0
FW	(England)	Fred Durrant	27	3	6	4	33	7
FW	(England)	Jim Gotts	4	1	2	0	6	1
FW	(England)	Eric Jones	20	1	4	0	24	1
FW	(Wales)	Idris Hopkins	36	0	8	3	44	3
FW	(England)	Doug Keene	2	0	—		2	0
FW	(Scotland)	Gerry McAloon	20	17	7	6	27	23
FW	(England)	Ernest Muttitt	1	0	—		1	0
FW	(England)	Maurice Roberts	1	1	—		1	1
FW	(England)	Les Smith	9	0	—		9	0
FW	(England)	Roy Stroud	4	0	—		4	0
FW	(England)	John Sutton	1	0	—		1	0
FW	(England)	Bob Thomas	33	17	8	1	41	18
FW	(England)	Len Townsend	18	14	3	1	21	15
FW	(England)	George Wilkins	3	2	—		3	2
Players guested during the season
GK	(England)	Johnny Mapson	6	0	—		6	0
DF	(Scotland)	Harry Ferrier	2	0	—		2	0
HB	(England)	Ted Fenton	1	0	—		1	0
HB	(Scotland)	Willie Phillips	8	0	—		8	0
HB	(England)	Bill Whittaker	19	0	4	0	23	0
HB	(England)	Ron Wilson	1	0	—		1	0
FW	(England)	Maurice Edelston	1	1	—		1	1
FW	(England)	Douglas Hunt	12	2	—		12	2
FW	(Ireland)	Paddy Sloan	6	4	—		6	4
FW	(England)	Willie Watson	1	1	—		1	1

- Players listed in italics left the club mid-season.
- Source: 100 Years Of Brentford

=== Goalscorers ===
Pos.	Nat	Player	FLS	FAC	Total
FW	(Scotland)	Gerry McAloon	17	6	23
FW	(England)	Bob Thomas	17	1	18
FW	(England)	Len Townsend	14	1	15
FW	(England)	Fred Durrant	3	4	7
HB	(England)	Billy Scott	4	1	5
FW	(Ireland)	Paddy Sloan	4	—	4
FW	(Wales)	Idris Hopkins	0	3	3
FW	(England)	Douglas Hunt	2	—	2
FW	(England)	George Wilkins	2	—	2
FW	(England)	Maurice Edelston	1	—	1
FW	(England)	Willie Watson	1	—	1
FW	(England)	Harry Bamford	1	0	1
FW	(England)	Jim Gotts	1	0	1
FW	(England)	Eric Jones	1	0	1
FW	(England)	Maurice Roberts	1	0	1
HB	(England)	George Smith	1	0	1
Opponents			2	1	3
Total			82	17	99

- Players listed in italics left the club mid-season.
- Source: 100 Years Of Brentford

=== Wartime international caps ===
Pos.	Nat	Player	Caps	Goals	Ref
FW	(England)	Les Smith	3	0	

=== Management ===
Name	Nat	From	To	Record All Comps					Record				
Name	Nat	From	To	P	W	D	L	W %	P	W	D	L	W %
Harry Curtis	(England)	25 August 1945	4 May 1946	50	17	12	21	34.00|	42	14	10	18	33.33

=== Summary ===
Games played	50 (42 Football League South, 8 FA Cup)
Games won	17 (14 Football League South, 3 FA Cup)
Games drawn	12 (10 Football League South, 2 FA Cup)
Games lost	21 (18 Football League South, 3 FA Cup)
Goals scored	99 (82 Football League South, 17 FA Cup)
Goals conceded	86 (72 Football League South, 14 FA Cup)
Clean sheets	9 (6 Football League South, 3 FA Cup)
Biggest league win	7–0 versus Millwall, 15 December 1945
Worst league defeat	4–1 on two occasions
Most appearances	50, Bill Gorman (42 Football League South, 8 FA Cup)
Top scorer (league)	17, Gerry McAloon
Top scorer (all competitions)	23, Gerry McAloon

== Transfers & loans ==
Guest players' arrival and departure dates correspond to their first and last appearances of the season.

Players transferred in
Date	Pos.	Name	Previous club	Fee	Ref.
19 November 1945	HB	(England) George Smith	(England) Charlton Athletic	£4,000	
November 1945	HB	(England) Frank Latimer	(England) Snowdown Colliery Welfare	Free	
24 December 1945	FW	(Scotland) Gerry McAloon	(England) Wolverhampton Wanderers	£500	
December 1945	HB	(England) Eric Jones	(England) West Bromwich Albion	n/a	
1945	GK	(England) Alf Jefferies	(England) Oxford City	Amateur	
January 1946	FW	(England) Jim Gotts	(England) Ashington	Free	
March 1946	DF	(England) Eric Ventom	(Scotland) Ayr Newton Rovers	n/a	
April 1946	FW	(England) Doug Keene	(England) Kingsbury Town	Amateur	
April 1946	DF	(Scotland) Roddy Munro	(Scotland) Rangers	Amateur	
Guest players in
Date	Pos.	Name	From	Date to	Ref.
25 August 1945	FW	(England) Douglas Hunt	(England) Sheffield Wednesday	24 November 1945	
25 August 1945	GK	(England) Johnny Mapson	(England) Sunderland	15 September 1945	
25 August 1945	FW	(Ireland) Paddy Sloan	(England) Tranmere Rovers	29 September 1945	
25 August 1945	HB	(England) Bill Whittaker	(England) Charlton Athletic	29 April 1946	
6 September 1945	DF	(Scotland) Harry Ferrier	(England) Barnsley	13 September 1945	
13 September 1945	HB	(England) Ted Fenton	(England) West Ham United	13 September 1945	
15 September 1945	HB	(Scotland) Willie Phillips	(Scotland) Heart of Midlothian	15 December 1945	
15 December 1945	FW	(England) Willie Watson	(England) Huddersfield Town	15 December 1945	
16 February 1946	HB	(England) Ron Wilson	(England) West Ham United	16 February 1946	
24 April 1946	FW	(England) Maurice Edelston	(England) Reading	24 April 1946	
Players transferred out
Date	Pos.	Name	Subsequent club	Fee	Ref.
October 1945	FW	(England) Les Smith	(England) Aston Villa	£6,000	
October 1945	FW	(England) Tommy Cheetham	(England) Lincoln City	n/a	
April 1946	DF	(England) Ted Ballard	(England) Clapton Orient	n/a	
April 1946	FW	(England) Cyril Brown	(England) Sunderland	n/a	
April 1946	DF	(England) George Poyser	(England) Plymouth Argyle	£3,500	
April 1946	FW	(England) Bob Thomas	(England) Plymouth Argyle	£3,500	
Guest players out
Date from	Pos.	Name	To	Date to	Ref.
1 September 1945	DF	(England) Harry Oliver	(England) Leeds United	1 September 1945	
19 September 1945	FW	(England) Les Smith	(England) Queens Park Rangers	19 September 1945	
13 October 1945	FW	(Wales) Idris Hopkins	(England) West Ham United	13 October 1945	
19 January 1946	FW	(England) Len Townsend	(England) Colchester United	19 January 1946	
9 March 1946	GK	(England) Alf Jefferies	(England) Colchester United	9 March 1946	
March 1946	FW	(Wales) Johnny Baynham	(England) Clapton Orient	n/a	
13 April 1946	DF	(England) Harry Bamford	(England) Colchester United	13 April 1946	
13 April 1946	FW	(England) Jim Gotts	(England) Colchester United	13 April 1946	
13 April 1946	DF	(Scotland) Roddy Munro	(England) Colchester United	13 April 1946	
13 April 1946	FW	(England) Ernest Muttitt	(England) Colchester United	13 April 1946	
13 April 1946	FW	(England) John Sutton	(England) Colchester United	13 April 1946	
n/a	DF	(England) Jimmy Anderson	(Scotland) Queen of the South	n/a	
n/a	FW	(England) Ernest Muttitt	(England) Luton Town	n/a	
n/a	DF	(England) Harry Oliver	(England) York City	n/a	
n/a	FW	(England) John Sutton	(England) Bristol City	n/a	
