= Ronald Brown =

Ronald or Ron Brown may refer to:

== Politicians ==
- Ron Brown (Australian politician) (1915–1992), Tasmanian politician
- Ronald Brown (English politician) (1921–2002), British member of parliament for Hackney South and Shoreditch
- Ron Brown (Scottish politician) (1940–2007), member of parliament for Leith
- Ron Brown (1941–1996), United States Secretary of Commerce
- Ron Brown (Wisconsin politician) (born 1946), Wisconsin legislator

== Sport ==
=== American football ===
- Ron Brown (wide receiver) (born 1961), American football player and sprinter
- Ron Brown (linebacker) (born 1967), American football player
- Ron Brown Jr. (born 2000), American football running back

=== Other sports ===
- Ron Brown (footballer) (1923–1968), Northern Irish footballer
- Ron Brown (cricketer) (1924–2008), New Zealand cricketer
- Ronald Brown (rugby union) (born 1995), South African rugby player
- Ron Brown (wide receiver) (born 1961), American sprinter and football player

== Other people ==
- Ronald Brown (bishop) (1926–2019), Bishop of Birkenhead
- Ronald Drayton Brown (1927–2008), Australian chemist
- Ronald Brown (mathematician) (1935–2024), British mathematician
- Ronald Brown (puppeteer) (c. 1955–2020), American puppeteer and pedophile
- Ron Brown (Australian public servant) (fl. 1977–1990), Australian public servant
- Ronald K. Brown (born 1967), American dancer and choreographer

== Other uses ==
- NOAAS Ronald H. Brown, a blue-water research vessel of the U.S. National Oceanic and Atmospheric Administration

== See also ==
- Ronnie Brown (disambiguation)
