= Toulose =

Toulose may refer to:

- Cyril Toulose, English footballer

See also:

- Toulouse
