= Maurice Robert =

Maurice Robert may refer to:

- Maurice Robert (aviator)
- Maurice Robert (ethnologist)
- Maurice Robert (intelligence officer), a prominent figure in the French secret service SDECE

== See also ==
- Maurice Roberts (disambiguation)
