= Maurice Roberts =

Maurice Roberts can refer to:

- Maurice Roberts (ice hockey) (1905–1975), American ice hockey player
- Maurice Roberts (cricketer) (1916–1998), Australian cricketer
- Maurice Roberts (footballer) (1922–1993), English footballer
- Maurice Roberts (minister) (born 1938), English minister
