= Dickie Girling =

English footballer

Personal information
- Full name: Howard Milton Girling
- Date of birth: 24 May 1922
- Place of birth: Birmingham, England
- Date of death: 7 January 1992 (aged 69)
- Place of death: Camden Town, England
- Position: Outside forward

Senior career*
Years	Team	Apps	(Gls)
1943–1947	Crystal Palace	26	(6)
1947–1951	Brentford	86	(9)
1951	Bournemouth & Boscombe Athletic	4	(0)
1951–1958	Hastings United		
- * Club domestic league appearances and goals

Howard Milton Girling (24 May 1922 – 7 January 1992) was an English professional footballer who played as an outside forward in the Football League for Brentford, Crystal Palace and Bournemouth & Boscombe Athletic.

== Club career ==
=== Crystal Palace ===
An outside forward, Girling signed for Crystal Palace in 1942, during the Second World War. After hostilities ceased in 1945, he made 27 appearances and scored six goals for the Third Division South club before departing in February 1947.

=== Brentford ===
Girling moved up the pyramid to rejoin First Division strugglers Brentford in February 1947, for whom he had previously guested during the Second World War. He made 15 appearances in what remained of the 1946–47 season and was unable to help the club from relegation to the Second Division. He established himself in the team in the 1947–48 season, making 35 appearances. His appearance-count reduced over the next two seasons, so much so that he spent 1950–51 in the reserves, before leaving Griffin Park at the end of that season. Girling made 90 appearances and scored 10 goals in four years with Brentford.

=== Bournemouth & Boscombe Athletic ===
In July 1951, Girling dropped down to the Third Division South to join Bournemouth & Boscombe Athletic for a short spell.

=== Hastings United ===
Girling dropped into non-League football and ended his career with Southern League club Hastings United. A highlight of his time with the Us were two runs to the third round proper of the FA Cup.

== Career statistics ==
Appearances and goals by club, season and competition
Club	Season	League			FA Cup		Other		Total	
Club	Season	Division	Apps	Goals	Apps	Goals	Apps	Goals	Apps	Goals
Southport	1945–46	—					1 (Note: Appearance in Lancashire Senior Cup)	0	1	0
Crystal Palace	1946–47	Third Division South	26	6	1	0	—		27	6
Brentford	1946–47	First Division	15	1	—		—		15	1
Brentford	1947–48	Second Division	33	5	2	1	—		35	6
Brentford	1948–49	Second Division	24	2	2	0	—		26	2
Brentford	1949–50	Second Division	14	1	0	0	—		14	1
Brentford	Total		86	9	4	1	—		90	10
Career total			112	15	5	2	1	0	118	17
