= Jimmy Dougall =

English footballer

Personal information
- Full name: James Hendry Dougall
- Date of birth: 24 September 1898
- Place of birth: Wishaw, Scotland
- Date of death: 1966 (aged 67–68)
- Place of death: Coventry, England
- Height: 5 ft 8 in (1.73 m)
- Position: Outside right

Senior career*
Years	Team	Apps	(Gls)
–1918	Cleland Juniors		
1918–1919	Motherwell	0	(0)
1919–1926	Coventry City	227	(13)
1926–1927	Reading	11	(0)
- * Club domestic league appearances and goals

James Hendry Dougall (24 September 1898 – 1966) was a Scottish professional footballer who made over 220 appearances in the Football League for Coventry City as an outside right. He is a member of the Coventry City Hall of Fame and also played League football for Reading. Dougall was described as "a tricky winger whose accurate crosses resulted in many goals".

== Personal life ==
Dougall had six sons, two of whom (Tommy and Gordon) also became footballers.

== Career statistics ==
Appearances and goals by club, season and competition
Club	Season	League			National Cup		Total	
Club	Season	Division	Apps	Goals	Apps	Goals	Apps	Goals
Coventry City	1919–20	Second Division	11	1	2	0	13	1
Coventry City	1920–21	Second Division	37	2	2	0	39	2
Coventry City	1921–22	Second Division	32	1	2	0	34	1
Coventry City	1922–23	Second Division	34	3	1	0	35	3
Coventry City	1923–24	Second Division	33	3	0	0	33	3
Coventry City	1924–25	Second Division	41	2	2	0	43	2
Coventry City	1925–26	Third Division North	38	2	1	0	39	2
Career total			227	13	10	0	237	13

== Honours ==
- Coventry City Hall of Fame
