= Paddy Harris =

Irish footballer

Personal information
- Full name: Kevin Thomas Harris
- Date of birth: 20 February 1918
- Place of birth: Dublin, Ireland
- Date of death: 1984 (aged 65–66)
- Place of death: Ireland
- Positions: Wing half; inside forward

Senior career*
Years	Team	Apps	(Gls)
- Shamrock Rovers
1945–????	Notts County	0	(0)
–1948	Limerick		
1948–1949	Brentford	4	(0)
- * Club domestic league appearances and goals

Kevin Thomas Harris (20 February 1918 – 1984) was an Irish professional footballer who played in the Football League for Brentford as a wing half.

== Personal life ==
Harris served in the Irish Guards during the Second World War.

== Career statistics ==
Appearances and goals by club, season and competition
Club	Season	League			National Cup		Total	
Club	Season	Division	Apps	Goals	Apps	Goals	Apps	Goals
Brentford	1948–49	Second Division	4	0	—		4	0
Career total			4	0	0	0	4	0
