= Peter McKennan =

Scottish footballer (1918–1991)

Personal information
- Full name: Peter Stewart McKennan
- Date of birth: 16 July 1918
- Place of birth: Airdrie, Scotland
- Date of death: 28 September 1991 (aged 73)
- Place of death: Dundonald, Scotland
- Height: 5 ft 11 in (1.80 m)
- Position: Inside forward

Senior career*
Years	Team	Apps	(Gls)
–1934	Whitburn		
1934–1947	Partick Thistle	131	(76)
1936	→ Raith Rovers (loan)	1	(1)
1939	→ Linfield (guest)		
1940	→ Glentoran (guest)		
1941–1942	→ West Bromwich Albion (guest)		
1942–1943	→ Chelsea (guest)		
1943–1944	→ Brentford (guest)		
1947–1948	West Bromwich Albion	11	(4)
1948	Leicester City	18	(7)
1948–1949	Brentford	24	(6)
1949–1951	Middlesbrough	40	(18)
1951–1954	Oldham Athletic	78	(28)
1954–1956	Coleraine	62	(29)
Total		365	(169)

International career
1937–1938	Scottish League XI	2	(1)
- Irish League XI
1940	Scotland (wartime)	1	(1)

Managerial career
- 1954–1956: Coleraine (player-manager)
- * Club domestic league appearances and goals

Peter Stewart McKennan (16 July 1918 – 28 September 1991) was a Scottish professional footballer who played as an inside forward in the Scottish and English leagues, most notably for Partick Thistle, for whom he scored 113 goals in 198 appearances in all competitions. McKennan represented the Scottish and Irish League representative teams and is a member of the Partick Thistle Hall of Fame. He was nicknamed "Ma Ba" ("my ball"), due to his desire to receive the ball into feet and dictate play.

== Club career ==
An inside forward, McKennan began his senior career with Scottish League First Division club Partick Thistle in 1934 and though his career was interrupted by Second World War, he remained with the club through the war. He made nearly 200 appearances for the club in all competitions, scoring 113 goals and was posthumously inducted into the club's Hall of Fame. McKennan moved south of the border to join Second Division club West Bromwich Albion (for whom he had guested during the war) for a £10,650 fee in October 1947.

McKennan went on to play for Football League clubs Leicester City, Brentford, Middlesbrough and Oldham Athletic and scored 63 goals in 171 appearances, before moving to Northern Ireland in 1954, where he played out two injury-ravaged seasons as player-manager of Coleraine. As of December 2018, McKennan is the third of three Brentford players to register five goals in a single league match.

== International career ==
After making appearances for the Scottish and Irish League representative teams, McKennan scored on his solitary appearance for Scotland in a 3–2 win over an Irish XI on 28 April 1940.

== Personal life ==
McKennan served in the Royal Welch Fusiliers during the Second World War and saw action as a Command Sergeant-Major on D-Day. He was mentioned in dispatches.

== Career statistics ==
Appearances and goals by club, season and competition
Club	Season	League			National cup (Note: Includes Scottish Cup, FA Cup)		Total	
Club	Season	Division	Apps	Goals	Apps	Goals	Apps	Goals
Partick Thistle	1935–36	Scottish First Division	19	6	1	0	20	6
Partick Thistle	1936–37	Scottish First Division	33	20	4	1	37	21
Partick Thistle	1937–38	Scottish First Division	35	20	4	4	39	24
Partick Thistle	1938–39	Scottish First Division	34	24	2	1	36	25
Partick Thistle	Total		121	70	11	6	131	76
Raith Rovers (loan)	1936–37	Scottish Second Division	1	1	—		1	1
West Bromwich Albion	1947–48	Second Division	11	4	1	0	12	4
Leicester City	1947–48	Second Division	11	4	—		11	4
Leicester City	1948–49	Second Division	7	3	—		7	3
Leicester City	Total		18	7	—		18	7
Brentford	1948–49	Second Division	24	6	4	3	28	9
Middlesbrough	1949–50	First Division	33	15	3	1	36	16
Middlesbrough	1950–51	First Division	7	3	0	0	7	3
Middlesbrough	Total		40	18	3	1	43	19
Career total			215	106	19	10	234	116

== Honours ==
=== As a player ===
Oldham Athletic

- Football League Third Division North: 1952–53

=== As a manager ===
Coleraine

- North West Senior Cup: 1954–55, 1955–56

=== As an individual ===
- Partick Thistle Hall of Fame
