= Dai Woodward =

Association football player

Personal information
- Full name: Laurence Woodward
- Date of birth: 5 July 1918
- Place of birth: Troed-y-rhiw, Wales
- Date of death: December 1997 (aged 79)
- Place of death: Bournemouth, England
- Position: Wing half

Youth career
- Troed-y-rhiw

Senior career*
Years	Team	Apps	(Gls)
–1938	Folkestone		
1938–1939	Wolverhampton Wanderers	0	(0)
1938–1939	→ Walsall (loan)	29	(0)
1939–1953	Bournemouth & Boscombe Athletic	272	(7)
- * Club domestic league appearances and goals

Laurence Woodward (5 July 1918 – December 1997) was a Welsh professional footballer who made over 270 appearances in the Football League for Bournemouth & Boscombe Athletic as a wing half. After his retirement, he coached the youth and reserve teams at Bournemouth & Boscombe Athletic until 1964.

== Personal life ==
One of Woodward's relatives, Viv, was also a footballer and won one cap for Wales.
