= Ronnie Brown (disambiguation) =

Ronnie Brown (born 1981) is an American football player.

Ronnie Brown may also refer to:

- Ronnie Brown (footballer) (born 1944), English soccer player
- Ronnie R. Brown (born 1946), Canadian poet
- Ronnie Browne (born 1937), Scottish folk musician
- Ronald Brown (mathematician) (1935–2024), English mathematician
- Ronnie Brown or Ron Brown Jr. (born 2000), American football player

== See also ==
- Ronald Brown (disambiguation)
