= Viv Woodward (Welsh footballer) =

Welsh footballer

Personal information
- Full name: Vivian Woodward
- Date of birth: 25 May 1914
- Place of birth: Troed-y-rhiw, Wales
- Positions: Inside forward; wing half

Youth career
- 1932–1933: Troed-y-rhiw

Senior career*
Years	Team	Apps	(Gls)
1933–1936	Folkestone		
1936–1947	Fulham	95	(26)
1947–1948	Millwall	42	(13)
1948–1950	Brentford	20	(1)
1950–1951	Aldershot	53	(5)
1951–1954	Bedford Town	149	(62)
- Biggleswade Town

International career
- Wales Schoolboys
1941	Wales (wartime)	1	(1)
- * Club domestic league appearances and goals

Vivian Woodward was a Welsh professional footballer who played in the Football League for Fulham, Aldershot, Millwall and Brentford as an inside forward. He represented Wales in a wartime international match in 1941.

== Career ==
=== Early years in non-League football ===
An inside forward, Woodward played for hometown club Troed-y-rhiw as a youth and moved to Southern League club Folkestone in 1933 and departed in 1936.

=== Football League (1936–1951) ===
In January 1936, Woodard earned a move to the Football League with Second Division club Fulham for a £300 fee. During an 11-year spell at Craven Cottage, which was interrupted by the Second World War, he made 95 appearances and scored 26 goals. Woodward signed for Second Division strugglers Millwall in February 1947. He scored seven goals in 15 league games to help the Lions stave off relegation to the Third Division South. He was in and out of the team during the 1947–48 season, making 27 appearances and scoring six goals. He departed the club at the end of the campaign after Millwall's relegation was confirmed with a bottom-place finish in the Second Division. Woodward made 42 appearances and scored 13 goals in just over a year with Millwall.

Woodward moved back to West London to sign for Second Division club Brentford in July 1948. He began his time with the Bees as a regular in the team, before being dropped for large part of the 1948–49 season and not returning until the final month of the campaign. He made just 10 appearances and scored one goal. He failed to fare much better in the following season, scoring one goal in 10 games and eventually departing Griffin Park in February 1950. Woodward signed for Third Division South strugglers Aldershot in February 1950. He quickly established himself in the team, making 16 league appearances before the end of the 1949–50 season. He made 37 appearances during the 1950–51 season (the highest of his career), but failed to inspire the Shots to more than an 18th-place finish. He left the club in May 1951, after making 53 league appearances and scoring five goals.

=== Return to non-League football ===
Woodward dropped into non-League football to sign for Southern League club Bedford Town in 1951. Despite failing to enjoy much success in the league, he was a regular pick for the team and showed good goalscoring form, scoring 62 goals in 149 appearances for the club. In 1954, he transferred to Eastern Counties League club Biggleswade Town in exchange for Percy Duggan.

== International career ==
Woodward represented Wales at schoolboy level. He represented the senior team in a wartime international on 7 June 1941, scoring in a 3–2 defeat to England at Ninian Park.

== Coaching career ==
During his time as a player with Bedford Town, Woodward also served as assistant manager and had a coaching spell at South Midlands League club Potton United.

== Personal life ==
One of Woodward's relatives, Laurence (nicknamed 'Dai'), was also a footballer and made over 270 appearances for Bournemouth & Boscombe Athletic. Woodward served as a lorry driver in the Royal Army Ordnance Corps during the Second World War.

== Career statistics ==
Appearances and goals by club, season and competition
Club	Season	League			FA Cup		Total	
Club	Season	Division	Apps	Goals	Apps	Goals	Apps	Goals
Millwall	1946–47	Second Division	15	7	—		15	7
Millwall	1947–48	Second Division	27	6	0	0	27	6
Millwall	Total		42	13	0	0	42	13
Brentford	1948–49	Second Division	10	1	0	0	10	1
Brentford	1949–50	Second Division	10	3	0	0	10	3
Brentford	Total		20	4	0	0	20	4
Career total			62	17	0	0	62	17
