= John Gillies (footballer) =

Scottish footballer

Personal information
- Full name: John Crawford Gillies
- Date of birth: 22 October 1918
- Place of birth: Glasgow, Scotland
- Date of death: 4 November 1991 (aged 73)
- Place of death: Glasgow, Scotland
- Position: Outside left

Senior career*
Years	Team	Apps	(Gls)
–1936	Shawfield		
1936–1946	Clyde	83	(19)
1940–1944	→ Heart of Midlothian (guest)		
1941	→ Middlesbrough (guest)		
1941	→ Third Lanark (guest)		
1945–1946	→ St Mirren (guest)		
1946–1947	Brentford	5	(0)
- Morton
- * Club domestic league appearances and goals

John Crawford Gillies (22 October 1918 – 4 November 1991), sometimes known as Jackie Gillies, was a Scottish professional footballer who played as an outside left in the Scottish League for Clyde. He toured Canada and the US with the Scottish FA representative team in September 1939 and also briefly played in England for Brentford.

== Career statistics ==
Appearances and goals by club, season and competition
Club	Season	League			National cup (Note: Includes Scottish Cup, FA Cup)		Total	
Club	Season	Division	Apps	Goals	Apps	Goals	Apps	Goals
Clyde	1936–37	Scottish First Division	12	3	6	3	18	6
Clyde	1937–38	Scottish First Division	36	8	1	1	37	9
Clyde	1938–39	Scottish First Division	35	8	7	1	42	9
Clyde	Total		83	19	14	5	97	24
Brentford	1946–47	First Division	5	0	0	0	5	0
Career total			88	19	14	5	102	24

== Honours ==
Clyde

- Scottish Cup: 1938–39
