= Alec Blakeman =

English footballer

Personal information
- Full name: Alec George Blakeman
- Date of birth: 11 June 1918
- Place of birth: Oxford, England
- Date of death: November 1994 (aged 76)
- Place of death: Headington, England
- Position: Inside forward

Senior career*
Years	Team	Apps	(Gls)
- Wycombe Wanderers
1945–1946	Oxford City	15	(24)
1946–1948	Brentford	42	(7)
1948–1949	Sheffield United	5	(0)
1949–1950	Bournemouth	25	(8)
- March Town United
- * Club domestic league appearances and goals

Alec George Blakeman (11 June 1918 – November 1994) was an English professional footballer who played in the Football League for Brentford, Sheffield United and Bournemouth as an inside forward.

== Personal life ==
Blakeman spent four years in a German prisoner of war camp during the Second World War.

== Career statistics ==
Appearances and goals by club, season and competition
Club	Season	League			FA Cup		Total	
Club	Season	Division	Apps	Goals	Apps	Goals	Apps	Goals
Brentford	1946–47	First Division	8	4	0	0	8	4
Brentford	1947–48	Second Division	25	2	2	0	27	2
Brentford	1948–49	Second Division	9	1	—		9	1
Brentford	Total		42	7	2	0	44	7
Sheffield United	1948–49 (Note: Alec Blakeman at WorldFootball.net)	First Division	5	0	0	0	5	0
Career total			47	7	2	0	49	7
