= Alan Smith (footballer, born 1921) =

English footballer (1921–2019)

Personal information
- Full name: Alan Smith
- Date of birth: 15 October 1921
- Place of birth: Newcastle upon Tyne, England
- Date of death: 27 May 2019 (aged 97)
- Place of death: East Sussex, England
- Position: Outside left

Senior career*
Years	Team	Apps	(Gls)
1946	Arsenal	3	(0)
1946–1949	Brentford	13	(4)
1949–1950	Leyton Orient	6	(1)
1950–1953	Tonbridge		
1953–1954	Ashford Town	26	(6)
1954–1955	Whitstable		
1955–1956	Ramsgate Athletic		
1956	Dover		
1956–1957	Whitstable		
1957	Tunbridge Wells United (trial)		
1957–1958	Chatham Town		
- * Club domestic league appearances and goals

Alan Smith (15 October 1921 – 27 May 2019) was an English professional footballer who played as an outside left in the Football League for Arsenal, Brentford, and Leyton Orient making a total of 22 appearances, scoring 5 goals.

== Playing career ==
Smith joined First Division club Arsenal in May 1946 after being demobbed from the Army. He made his league debut, aged 24, on 7 September 1946 against Sunderland. He made only a further two appearances for "The Gunners" before, in December 1946, being transferred to another First Division club Brentford. Smith scored his first league goal on 26 December 1946 for Brentford in a 2–1 victory against Sheffield United and scored a total of three goals in ten league appearances for "The Bees" over the 1946–47 season – at the end of which the club were relegated. He did not play any further league matches for Brentford until the tail-end of the 1948–49 season, when he appeared in three Second Division matches, scoring one goal.

In July 1949 Smith was part of a player exchange deal (with Reg Newton moving in the opposite direction) that took him to Leyton Orient of the Football League Third Division South. He played in six matches, scoring one goal for "The Os" in the 1949–50 season. During the summer of 1950 Smith moved to non-league football when he signed with Tonbridge of the Southern Football League, reuniting with his former Brentford manager Harry Curtis. He spent three seasons with Tonbridge, and had the misfortune to suffer a broken leg break during the 1951–52 season albeit he was fit for the start his final season, 1952–53, with "The Angels".

Smith next signed with Ashford Town, who were managed by his former Brentford teammate David Nelson and played with the club for a single season, 1953–54, in the Kent League (his subsequent clubs were all members of this league). In September 1954 Smith joined Whitstable where he remained until early December 1955 when he then signed for Ramsgate Athletic. However, after a few games for "The Rams" reserves team, in February 1956 he to moved on to Dover. At the start of the following, 1956–57, season Smith rejoined Whitstable, however on 3 April 1957 he played his final match for "The Oystermen" – a midweek Thames and Medway Combination match against Tunbridge Wells United – as he was leaving the UK for Canada. However, Smith returned after several months and again played in the Kent League: in August 1957 he had a one month trial with Tunbridge Wells United, and then in October 1957 he joined Chatham Town for whom he played during the remainder of the 1957–58 season.

== Personal life ==
Whilst in Canada, Smith worked for a time at a uranium mine, then on his return to the UK he worked as a painter and decorator and also for the London Electricity Board. Together with his wife he was a medal winning ballroom dancer.

Smith died in East Sussex, England on 27 May 2019, aged 97.

== Career statistics ==
Appearances and goals by club, season and competition
Club	Season	League			FA Cup		Other		Total	
Club	Season	Division	Apps	Goals	Apps	Goals	Apps	Goals	Apps	Goals
Arsenal	1946–47	First Division	3	0	—		—		3	0
Brentford	1946–47	First Division	10	3	4	0	—		14	3
Brentford	1948–49	Second Division	3	1	0	0	—		3	1
Brentford	Total		13	4	4	0	—		17	4
Leyton Orient	1949–50	Third Division South	6	1	0	0	—		6	1
Ashford Town	1953–54	Kent League	26	6	2	0	4 (Note: 2 appearances in Kent League Cup, 1 appearance in Kent Senior Cup, 1 appearance in Kent Senior Shield)	0	32	6
Career total			48	11	6	0	4	0	58	11
