= George Stewart (footballer, born 1920) =

Scottish footballer (1920–2012)

Personal information
- Date of birth: 18 October 1920
- Place of birth: Chirnside, Scotland
- Date of death: 22 November 2012 (aged 92)
- Place of death: Bury St Edmunds, Suffolk, England
- Position: Inside forward

Senior career*
Years	Team	Apps	(Gls)
- Chirnside United
1942–1946	Hamilton Academical	25	(6)
1943–1944	→ Brentford (guest)	22	(8)
1946–1948	Brentford	24	(3)
1948–1953	Queens Park Rangers	36	(4)
1953	Shrewsbury Town	10	(2)
1953–1954	Dartford		
1954–19??	Guildford City		
- Gravesend & Northfleet
1956–19??	Hastings United		
1957–19??	Ashford Town		
Total		70	(9)
- * Club domestic league appearances and goals

George Stewart (18 October 1920 – 22 November 2012) was a Scottish professional footballer who played as an inside forward in the Football League for Queens Park Rangers, Brentford and Shrewsbury Town.

== Personal life and death ==
Stewart was born in Chirnside, a village in Berwickshire, on 18 October 1920. He served in the Royal Air Force during the Second World War, rising to the rank of Sergeant by 1943. Stewart died from a heart attack in Bury St Edmunds, Suffolk, on 22 November 2012, aged 92.

== Career statistics ==
Appearances and goals by club, season and competition
Club	Season	League			FA Cup		Total	
Club	Season	Division	Apps	Goals	Apps	Goals	Apps	Goals
Brentford	1946–47	First Division	16	3	1	0	17	3
Brentford	1947–48	Second Division	8	0	0	0	8	0
Brentford	Total		24	3	1	0	25	3
Queens Park Rangers	1947–48	Third Division South	14	1	—		14	1
Queens Park Rangers	1948–49	Second Division	12	2	2	0	14	2
Queens Park Rangers	1950–51	Second Division	1	0	0	0	1	0
Queens Park Rangers	1951–52	Second Division	9	1	0	0	9	1
Queens Park Rangers	Total		36	4	2	0	38	4
Career total			60	7	3	0	63	7
