= Fred Durrant =

English footballer and manager

Personal information
- Full name: Frederick Harry Durrant
- Date of birth: 19 June 1921
- Place of birth: Dover, England
- Date of death: 5 March 2010 (aged 88)
- Place of death: Dover, England
- Position: Centre forward

Senior career*
| Years | Team | Apps | (Gls) |
| –1938 | Folkestone | | |
| 1938–1946 | Brentford | 4 | (3) |
- → Aldershot (guest)
- → Blackburn Rovers (guest)
| 1946–1949 | Queens Park Rangers | 51 | (26) |
| 1949–1950 | Exeter City | 17 | (5) |
| 1950–1952 | Dover | | |

Managerial career
- 1950–1957: Dover
- * Club domestic league appearances and goals

Frederick Harry Durrant (19 June 1921 – 5 March 2010) was an English professional footballer who played as a forward in the Football League, most notably for Queens Park Rangers. He later played for and managed non-League club Dover.

== Playing career ==
=== Brentford ===
A centre forward, Durrant began his career at Southern League club Folkestone, before signing for First Division club Brentford on his 17th birthday in 1938. He failed to make a first team appearance before the outbreak of the Second World War the following year saw competitive football suspended. Durrant made wartime appearances for the Bees and guested for Aldershot and Blackburn Rovers. Durrant finally made his competitive debut for the club in the 1945–46 season and scored in a 2–2 FA Cup third round first leg draw with Tottenham Hotspur on 5 January 1946. He scored three further goals in the competition and finished the season with four goals from six appearances.

Durrant made his Football League debut in a First Division match versus Blackpool on 2 September 1946 and scored the opening goal in a 2–2 draw. He made the headlines in the following game against Wolverhampton Wanderers, when he left the pitch during the first half with concussion, before returning for the second half and scoring two goals in a 2–1 win. Soon afterwards, he was surprisingly transferred by manager Harry Curtis. Durrant scored seven goals in 10 competitive appearances for the Bees. At the time of his death in March 2010, Durrant was Brentford's oldest-living player.

=== Queens Park Rangers ===
Durrant joined Third Division South club Queens Park Rangers in late September 1946, for a then-record £4,500 fee. With the club's regular centre forwards away on army duty, Durrant was signed to bolster the high-flying club's frontline. Denied promotion with a second-place finish during the 1946–47 season, Durrant finally won the first silverware of his career when Rangers won the 1947–48 Third Division South championship. Durrant departed Loftus Road in February 1949 and scored 26 goals in 53 appearances for the club.

=== Exeter City ===
Durrant signed for Third Division South club Exeter City in February 1949, for a then-club record £5,000. In an injury-affected spell, he managed 5 goals in 17 league appearances, before retiring from league football in 1950.

=== Dover ===
Durrant ended his career with Kent League First Division club Dover, for whom he played between 1950 and 1952.

== Management career ==
Durrant undertook a player-manager role upon joining Dover and remained in the role after retiring from playing. He had a successful time with the club, winning the Kent League and Senior Cup double in the 1951–52 season and the Kent League Cup in 1956–57.

== Personal life ==
After football, Durrant settled in Dover and ran a cafe.

== Career statistics ==
Appearances and goals by club, season and competition
| Club | Season | League | | | FA Cup | | Total | |
| Club | Season | Division | Apps | Goals | Apps | Goals | Apps | Goals |
|---|---|---|---|---|---|---|---|---|
| Brentford | 1945–46 | — | | | 6 | 4 | 6 | 4 |
| Brentford | 1946–47 | First Division | 4 | 3 | — | | 4 | 3 |
| Brentford | Total | | 4 | 3 | 6 | 4 | 10 | 7 |
| Queens Park Rangers | 1946–47 | Third Division South | 22 | 14 | 0 | 0 | 22 | 14 |
| Queens Park Rangers | 1947–48 | Third Division South | 27 | 12 | 0 | 0 | 27 | 12 |
| Queens Park Rangers | 1948–49 | Second Division | 2 | 0 | 2 | 0 | 4 | 0 |
| Queens Park Rangers | Total | | 51 | 26 | 2 | 0 | 53 | 26 |
| Exeter City | 1948–49 | Third Division South | 13 | 4 | — | | 13 | 4 |
| Exeter City | 1949–50 | Third Division South | 4 | 1 | 0 | 0 | 4 | 1 |
| Exeter City | Total | | 17 | 5 | 0 | 0 | 17 | 5 |
| Career total | | | 72 | 34 | 8 | 4 | 80 | 38 |

== Honours ==
=== As a player ===
Queens Park Rangers

- Football League Third Division South: 1947–48

Dover

- Kent League First Division: 1951–52
- Kent Senior Cup: 1951–52
- Dover Charity Cup: 1950–51

=== As a manager ===
Dover

- Kent League First Division: 1951–52
- Kent Senior Cup: 1951–52
- Kent League Cup: 1956–57
- Dover Charity Cup: 1950–51
