= Eric Ventom =

English footballer

Personal information
- Full name: Eric George Ventom
- Date of birth: 15 February 1920
- Place of birth: Hemsworth, England
- Date of death: June 1998 (aged 78)
- Place of death: Wakefield, England
- Position: Full back

Youth career
- Gailes Army Camp

Senior career*
Years	Team	Apps	(Gls)
1946–1948	Brentford	1	(0)
- * Club domestic league appearances and goals

Eric George Ventom (15 February 1920 – June 1998) was an English professional footballer who made one appearance as a full back in the Football League for Brentford. He suffered a broken leg on his debut for the club on Christmas Day, 1947.

== Career statistics ==
Appearances and goals by club, season and competition
Club	Season	League			FA Cup		Total	
Club	Season	Division	Apps	Goals	Apps	Goals	Apps	Goals
Brentford	1947–48	Second Division	1	0	0	0	1	0
Career total			1	0	0	0	1	0
