= Maurice Roberts (cricketer) =

Australian cricketer

Personal information
- Born: 26 August 1916; Wallaroo Mines, South Australia
- Died: 24 April 1998 (aged 81)
- Source: Cricinfo, 25 September 2020

Maurice Roberts (26 August 1916 – 24 April 1998) was an Australian cricketer. He played in three first-class matches for South Australia between 1937 and 1947.

== See also ==
- List of South Australian representative cricketers
