= Arthur Shaw (footballer, born 1924) =

English footballer

Personal information
- Full name: Arthur Shaw
- Date of birth: 9 April 1924
- Place of birth: Limehouse, England
- Date of death: 2 November 2015 (aged 91)
- Place of death: Hermosa Beach, California, United States
- Position: Wing half

Senior career*
Years	Team	Apps	(Gls)
- Whitton Rovers
1941	Hounslow Town		
1942–1944	Queens Park Rangers	1	(0)
1945	Southall		
1945–1946	Hayes	19	(4)
- → Hounslow Town (guest)
1946–1948	Brentford	4	(0)
1948–1955	Arsenal	57	(0)
1955–1956	Watford	3	(0)
1956–1959	Gravesend & Northfleet		
Total		84	(4)
- * Club domestic league appearances and goals

Arthur Shaw (9 April 1924 – 2 November 2015) was an English professional footballer who played as a wing half in the Football League for Brentford, Arsenal and Watford.

== Career ==
Born in Limehouse, Shaw made a total of 64 appearances in the Football League for Brentford, Arsenal and Watford. He also played non-League football for Southall, Hayes and Gravesend & Northfleet. Shaw made 25 league appearances during Arsenal's 1952–53 First Division championship-winning season. A flag bearing his name flies in tribute on the Ken Friar Bridge, close to Arsenal tube station.

== Career statistics ==
Appearances and goals by club, season and competition
Club	Season	League			FA Cup		Total	
Club	Season	Division	Apps	Goals	Apps	Goals	Apps	Goals
Brentford	1946–47	First Division	4	0	0	0	4	0
Arsenal	1949–50	First Division	5	0	0	0	5	0
Arsenal	1950–51	First Division	16	0	1	0	17	0
Arsenal	1951–52	First Division	8	0	2	0	10	0
Arsenal	1952–53	First Division	25	0	1	0	26	0
Arsenal	1953–54	First Division	2	0	0	0	2	0
Arsenal	1954–55	First Division	1	0	0	0	1	0
Arsenal	Total		57	0	4	0	61	0
Watford	1955–56	Third Division South	3	0	0	0	3	0
Career total			64	0	4	0	68	0

== Honours ==
Arsenal

- Football League First Division: 1952–53
