= Eric Jones (footballer, born 1915) =

English footballer & manager (1915–1985)

Personal information
- Full name: Eric Norman Jones
- Date of birth: 5 February 1915
- Place of birth: Aston, England
- Date of death: 2 October 1985 (aged 70)
- Place of death: Lincoln, England
- Position: Outside right

Senior career*
| Years | Team | Apps | (Gls) |
| –1934 | Stourport Power Station | | |
| 1934– | Kidderminster Harriers | | |
| –1936 | Jack Mould's Athletic | | |
| 1936 | Kidderminster Harriers | | |
| 1936–1937 | Wolverhampton Wanderers | 3 | (0) |
| 1937–1938 | Portsmouth | 1 | (0) |
| 1938–1939 | Stoke City | 0 | (0) |
| 1939–1945 | West Bromwich Albion | 0 | (0) |
| 1945–1946 | Brentford | 0 | (0) |
| 1946–1947 | Crewe Alexandra | 53 | (15) |
| 1946 | Macclesfield | 1 | (0) |
| 1947–1948 | Kidderminster Harriers | | |
| Total | | 57+ | (15+) |

Managerial career
- 1949–1951: BSC Young Boys
- 1953–1955: Beerschot
- 1960–1962: De Graafschap
- * Club domestic league appearances and goals

Eric Norman Jones (5 February 1915 – 2 October 1985) was an English footballer who played for Kidderminster Harriers, Wolverhampton Wanderers, Portsmouth, Stoke City, West Bromwich Albion, Brentford, and Crewe Alexandra. After the war he managed BSC Young Boys (Switzerland), Beerschot (Belgium), and De Graafschap (Netherlands).

== Playing career ==
Jones played for Kidderminster Harriers, Wolverhampton Wanderers, Portsmouth, Stoke City and West Bromwich Albion. During the war he guested for Portsmouth, Chelsea, Watford, Southend United, Tottenham Hotspur, Arsenal, Queens Park Rangers, Crystal Palace, Northampton Town, Fulham and Exeter City. After the war he continued his career with Brentford and then Crewe Alexandra.

== Management career ==
Jones managed Swiss side BSC Young Boys, leading the club to a seventh-place finish in the Nationalliga A in 1950–51. After leaving the Wankdorf Stadium, he took charge at Belgian club Beerschot. He later took charge at Dutch Tweede Divisie club De Graafschap.

He was appointed Port Vale's trainer-coach in June 1962, introducing revolutionary intensive training sessions for the players. He had to be taken off the pitch during his first match with the club after being struck by a bottle thrown from the crowd at Wrexham's Racecourse Ground. In his autobiography, Colin Grainger claimed that Jones were extremely unpopular with the squad and that the bottle had been thrown by a player. His approach of strict discipline was not favoured by the board either and he resigned his post at Vale Park for domestic reasons in October 1962.

== Personal life ==
Jones served in the Royal Artillery during the Second World War.

== Career statistics ==
Appearances and goals by club, season and competition
| Club | Season | League | | | FA Cup | | Total | |
| Club | Season | Division | Apps | Goals | Apps | Goals | Apps | Goals |
|---|---|---|---|---|---|---|---|---|
| Wolverhampton Wanderers | 1936–37 | First Division | 3 | 0 | 0 | 0 | 3 | 0 |
| Portsmouth | 1937–38 | First Division | 1 | 0 | 0 | 0 | 1 | 0 |
| Stoke City | 1938–39 | First Division | 0 | 0 | 0 | 0 | 0 | 0 |
| Brentford | 1945–46 | — | — | | 4 | 0 | 4 | 0 |
| Crewe Alexandra | 1946–47 | Third Division North | 39 | 14 | 1 | 0 | 40 | 14 |
| Crewe Alexandra | 1947–48 | Third Division North | 14 | 1 | 4 | 1 | 18 | 2 |
| Crewe Alexandra | Total | | 53 | 15 | 5 | 1 | 58 | 16 |
| Macclesfield | 1946–47 | Cheshire County League | 1 | 0 | — | | 1 | 0 |
| Career total | | | 58 | 15 | 9 | 1 | 67 | 16 |
