= Bob Thomas (footballer, born 1919) =

English footballer

Personal information
- Full name: Robert Albert Thomas
- Date of birth: 2 August 1919
- Place of birth: Stepney, England
- Date of death: March 1990 (aged 70)
- Place of death: Sutton, England
- Position: Inside forward

Senior career*
| Years | Team | Apps | (Gls) |
| 1936–1937 | Romford | | |
| 1937–1938 | Hayes | | |
| 1938–1939 | Golders Green | 13 | (9) |
| 1939–1946 | Brentford | 0 | (0) |
| 1946–1947 | Plymouth Argyle | 41 | (17) |
| 1947–1952 | Fulham | 167 | (55) |
| 1952–1955 | Crystal Palace | 96 | (31) |
| 1955–1957 | Kettering Town | | |
| 1957–1959 | Gravesend & Northfleet | | |
- Clacton Town
- * Club domestic league appearances and goals

Robert Albert Thomas (2 August 1919 – March 1990) was an English professional footballer who played as an inside forward in the Football League for Plymouth Argyle, Fulham and Crystal Palace.

== Career ==
Thomas played in the Football League for Plymouth Argyle, Fulham and Crystal Palace and scored 103 goals in 304 appearances. He also played for Golders Green, Brentford and Kettering Town and appeared as a guest player for West Ham United during the Second World War.

== Personal life ==
Thomas' brother, Dave, played in the Football League for several clubs as a centre forward and the two played alongside each other for Plymouth Argyle during the 1946–47 season.

== Honours ==
Golders Green

- Middlesex Senior Cup: 1938–39

== Career statistics ==
Appearances and goals by club, season and competition
| Club | Season | League | | | FA Cup | | Other | | Total | |
| Club | Season | Division | Apps | Goals | Apps | Goals | Apps | Goals | Apps | Goals |
|---|---|---|---|---|---|---|---|---|---|---|
| Golders Green | 1938–39 | Athenian League | 13 | 9 | — | | 9 (Note: 5 appearances and 3 goals in Middlesex Senior Cup, 4 appearances and 2 goals in FA Amateur Cup) | 5 | 22 | 14 |
| Brentford | 1945–46 | — | | | 8 | 1 | — | | 8 | 1 |
| Plymouth Argyle | 1946-47 | Second Division | 41 | 17 | 1 | 0 | — | | 42 | 17 |
| Career total | | | 54 | 26 | 9 | 1 | 9 | 5 | 72 | 32 |
