= Harry Bamford (footballer, born 1914) =

English footballer

Personal information
- Full name: Harry Frank Ernest Bamford
- Date of birth: 8 April 1914
- Place of birth: Kingston upon Thames, England
- Date of death: 4 June 1949 (aged 35)
- Place of death: Rochdale, England
- Positions: Left back; outside left

Youth career
- Ealing YMCA

Senior career*
Years	Team	Apps	(Gls)
- Ealing Celtic
1936	Hayes	4	(0)
1936–1946	Brentford	0	(0)
- → Aldershot (guest)
1946	→ Colchester United (guest)	1	(0)
1946	Brighton & Hove Albion	8	(0)
- * Club domestic league appearances and goals

Harry Frank Ernest Bamford MBE (8 April 1914 – 4 June 1949) was an English professional footballer who played in the Football League for Brighton & Hove Albion as a left back or outside left.

== Personal life ==
Bamford served as a squadron sergeant major in the Royal Army Service Corps in Italy during the Second World War and was twice mentioned in dispatches. He was later awarded an MBE.

== Career statistics ==
Appearances and goals by club, season and competition
Club	Season	League			FA Cup		Total	
Club	Season	Division	Apps	Goals	Apps	Goals	Apps	Goals
Brentford	1945–46	—			2	0	2	0
Colchester United (guest)	1945–46	Southern League	1	0	—		1	0
Career total			1	0	2	0	3	0
