= George Dews =

English cricketer and footballer

Personal information
- Born: 5 June 1921; Ossett, Yorkshire, England
- Died: 29 January 2003 (aged 81); Dudley, West Midlands, England
- Batting: Right-handed

Domestic team information
- Years: Team
- 1946–1961: Worcestershire

George Dews (5 June 1921 – 29 January 2003) was an English first-class cricketer and footballer. As a cricketer, he was a right-handed batsman who played for Worcestershire between 1946 and 1961. He was also an excellent fielder: his 353 catches for the county were a record at the time. As a footballer, he made nearly 300 Football League appearances for Middlesbrough, Plymouth Argyle and Walsall, scoring 85 goals.

Born in Ossett, Yorkshire, Dews was unable to play for his native county and so travelled south. He made his Worcestershire debut on 29 May 1946 against Lancashire, but was out for a king pair, being dismissed in each innings by slow left-armer Eric Price. He was also out for a duck in his third innings, against Warwickshire, and despite a long run in the team in 1948, it was not until 1950 that he really came good.

That year he broke the 1,000-run barrier for the first time, a feat he would repeat in all but one year (1952) for the rest of his first-class career. His 1,170 runs came at 29.25, and included his maiden century: 101 not out against Hampshire. 1950 also saw Dews receive his county cap. The following summer, he was part of an astonishing run-chase against Nottinghamshire, when Worcestershire successfully chased a target of 131 in forty minutes.

Dews maintained his consistent form into his late thirties: indeed, his most successful year was 1959, when he managed 1,752 runs at 41.71 in all first-class cricket, and was second only to Martin Horton in the Worcestershire batting averages. He was never picked for England, but did appear for Marylebone Cricket Club (MCC) in 1954, and for North of England four years later. He was granted a benefit season in 1960, and his final first-class game in September 1961 was for Worcestershire against Sussex; he made 26 and 34.

His bowling was of the strictly occasional variety, but he did claim two first-class wickets, both in 1954, including that of Derbyshire captain Guy Willatt.

After retirement Dews went into business and played golf to a good standard. He died at the age of 81 in Dudley, West Midlands.
