= William Gibson (footballer, born 1926) =

Scottish footballer

Personal information
- Full name: William James McNab Gibson
- Date of birth: 17 September 1926
- Place of birth: Glasgow, Scotland
- Date of death: 21 January 1995 (aged 68)
- Place of death: Westminster, England
- Position: Right back

Senior career*
Years	Team	Apps	(Gls)
–1947	Arsenal	0	(0)
1947–1951	Brentford	0	(0)
1951–1954	Tranmere Rovers	72	(1)
- * Club domestic league appearances and goals

William Gibson (17 September 1926 – 21 January 1995) was a Scottish professional footballer who played as a right back in the Football League for Tranmere Rovers.
