= Percy Gleeson =

English footballer

Personal information
- Full name: Percival Peter Gleeson
- Date of birth: 18 July 1921
- Place of birth: Acton, England
- Date of death: October 2015 (aged 94)
- Place of death: Barnsley, England
- Position: Inside forward

Senior career*
Years	Team	Apps	(Gls)
–1947	Hounslow Town		
1947–1948	Brentford	9	(1)
- Guildford City
- * Club domestic league appearances and goals

Percival Peter Gleeson (18 July 1921 – October 2015) was an English professional footballer who played as an inside forward in the Football League for Brentford. He later made 367 appearances and scored 111 goals for Southern League club Guildford City.

== Career statistics ==
Appearances and goals by club, season and competition
Club	Season	League			FA Cup		Total	
Club	Season	Division	Apps	Goals	Apps	Goals	Apps	Goals
Brentford	1947–48	Second Division	9	1	0	0	9	1
Career total			9	1	0	0	9	1
