= Doug Keene =

English footballer

Personal information
- Full name: Douglas Charles Keene
- Date of birth: 30 August 1928
- Place of birth: Hendon, England
- Date of death: 21 January 1986 (aged 57)
- Place of death: Kirkcaldy, Scotland
- Position: Wing half

Senior career*
Years	Team	Apps	(Gls)
–1946	Kingsbury Town		
1946–1950	Brentford	13	(1)
1950–1953	Brighton & Hove Albion	61	(10)
1953–1954	Colchester United	22	(1)
1954–?	Dartford		
- * Club domestic league appearances and goals

Douglas Charles Keene (30 August 1928 – 21 January 1986) was an English professional footballer who played as a wing half in the Football League for Brighton & Hove Albion, Colchester United and Brentford.

== Personal life ==
Keene served his National Service in the British Army.

== Career statistics ==
Appearances and goals by club, season and competition
Club	Season	League			National Cup		Total	
Club	Season	Division	Apps	Goals	Apps	Goals	Apps	Goals
Brentford	1948–49	Second Division	12	1	2	0	14	1
Brentford	1949-50	Second Division	1	0	0	0	1	0
Brentford	Total		13	1	2	0	15	1
Colchester United	1953–54	Third Division South	22	1	2	0	24	1
Career total			35	2	4	0	39	2
