= Tommy Dougall =

Scottish footballer and manager

Personal information
- Full name: Thomas Dougall
- Date of birth: 17 May 1921
- Place of birth: Wishaw, Scotland
- Date of death: January 1997 (aged 75)
- Place of death: Kingston upon Thames, England
- Position: Outside right

Youth career
- Morris Motors

Senior career*
Years	Team	Apps	(Gls)
1945–1947	Coventry City	0	(0)
1946–1947	→ Guildford City (loan)		
1947–1948	Brentford	2	(0)
1948–1950	Sunderland	3	(0)
1950–1951	Yeovil Town	18	(1)
1951–1953	Tonbridge	41	(4)

Managerial career
- 1963–1966: Hillingdon Borough
- c. 1967: Kingstonian
- * Club domestic league appearances and goals

Thomas Dougall (17 May 1921 – January 1997) was a Scottish professional footballer who played in the Football League for Sunderland and Brentford as an outside right. He later managed in non-League football.

== Personal life ==
Dougall was the son of footballer Jimmy Dougall.

== Career statistics ==
Appearances and goals by club, season and competition
Club	Season	League			FA Cup		Other		Total	
Club	Season	Division	Apps	Goals	Apps	Goals	Apps	Goals	Apps	Goals
Brentford	1947–48	Second Division	2	0	0	0	—		2	0
Sunderland	1948–49	First Division	3	0	0	0	0	0	3	0
Sunderland	1949–50	First Division	0	0	0	0	1 (Note: Appearance in Durham Senior Cup)	0	1	0
Sunderland	Total		3	0	0	0	1	0	4	0
Tonbridge	1951–52	Southern League	30	3	1	0	8 (Note: 3 appearances in Southern League Cup, 3 appearances in Kent Senior Shield, 2 appearances in Kent Senior Cup)	0	39	3
Tonbridge	1952–53	Southern League	11	1	2	0	4 (Note: 2 appearances in Southern League Cup, 1 appearance in Kent Senior Cup, 1 appearance in Kent Senior Shield)	0	17	1
Tonbridge	Total		41	4	3	0	12	0	56	4
Career total			46	4	3	0	13	0	62	4
