= Harry Ferrier =

Scottish footballer

Personal information
- Full name: Henry Ferrier
- Date of birth: 20 May 1920
- Place of birth: Ratho, Scotland
- Date of death: 16 October 2002 (aged 82)
- Place of death: Earls Colne, England
- Height: 5 ft 11 in (1.80 m)
- Position: Left back

Senior career*
Years	Team	Apps	(Gls)
- Ratho Park Rangers
–1937	Ratho Amateurs		
1937–1946	Barnsley	0	(0)
1946–1954	Portsmouth	241	(8)
1954–1956	Gloucester City	69	(5)

Managerial career
- 1954–1959: Gloucester City
- 1959–1963: Chelmsford City
- 1966–1969: Chelmsford City
- * Club domestic league appearances and goals

Henry Ferrier (20 May 1920 – 16 October 2002) was a Scottish professional footballer and manager who made over 240 appearances in the Football League for Portsmouth as a left back. He later managed Gloucester City and Chelmsford City in non-League football.

== Personal life ==
Ferrier was a Heart of Midlothian supporter. He was married with three children and served in the Royal Artillery during the Second World War. After leaving football, he worked in the commercial department for Essex County Cricket Club and as a crane driver.

== Career statistics ==
Appearances and goals by club, season and competition
Club	Season	League			FA Cup		Other		Total	
Club	Season	Division	Apps	Goals	Apps	Goals	Apps	Goals	Apps	Goals
Portsmouth	1946–47	First Division	40	0	2	0	—		42	0
Portsmouth	1947–48	First Division	28	1	0	0	—		28	1
Portsmouth	1948–49	First Division	40	0	5	0	—		45	0
Portsmouth	1949–50	First Division	42	0	6	1	—		48	1
Portsmouth	1950–51	First Division	40	2	0	0	—		40	2
Portsmouth	1951–52	First Division	32	4	4	0	1 (Note: Appearance in Hampshire Senior Cup)	0	37	4
Portsmouth	1952–53	First Division	16	1	0	0	—		16	1
Portsmouth	1953–54	First Division	3	0	0	0	—		3	0
Career total			241	8	17	1	1	0	259	9

== Honours ==
=== As a player ===
Portsmouth

- Football League First Division: 1948–49, 1949–50
- FA Charity Shield: 1949 (shared)

=== As a manager ===
Chelmsford City

- Southern League Premier Division: 1967–68
- Southern League Cup: 1959–60
- Eastern Floodlight Cup: 1966–67
