= Horace Gager =

English footballer

Personal information
- Full name: Horace Edwin Gager
- Date of birth: 25 January 1917
- Place of birth: West Ham, England
- Date of death: March 1984 (aged 67)
- Place of death: Bingham, England
- Position: Centre half

Senior career*
Years	Team	Apps	(Gls)
- Vauxhall Motors (Luton)
1937–1947	Luton Town	59	(2)
- Glentoran
1947–1955	Nottingham Forest	258	(11)

International career
	Irish League XI	2	
- * Club domestic league appearances and goals

Horace Edwin Gager (25 January 1917 – March 1984) was an English professional footballer who made over 250 appearances as a centre half in the Football League for Nottingham Forest and captained the club. He also played for Luton Town and represented the Irish League XI.

== Career statistics ==
Appearances and goals by club, season and competition
Club	Season	League			FA Cup		Total	
Club	Season	Division	Apps	Goals	Apps	Goals	Apps	Goals
Nottingham Forest	1947–48	Second Division	12	1	0	0	12	1
Nottingham Forest	1948–49	Second Division	43	0	2	0	45	0
Nottingham Forest	1949–50	Third Division South	37	1	2	0	39	1
Nottingham Forest	1950–51	Third Division South	48	2	2	0	50	2
Nottingham Forest	1951–52	Second Division	39	0	1	0	40	0
Nottingham Forest	1952–53	Second Division	43	1	2	0	45	1
Nottingham Forest	1953–54	Second Division	42	6	1	0	43	6
Nottingham Forest	1954–55	Second Division	5	0	0	0	5	0
Career total			269	11	11	0	280	11
