= Ron Wilson (footballer, born 1924) =

English footballer

Personal information
- Date of birth: 10 September 1924
- Place of birth: Sale, Cheshire, England
- Date of death: 31 January 2007 (aged 82)
- Place of death: Virginia Beach, Virginia, USA
- Position: Wing half

Senior career*
Years	Team	Apps	(Gls)
1943–1947	West Ham United	3	(0)
- * Club domestic league appearances and goals

Ron Wilson (10 September 1924 – 31 January 2007) was an English footballer who played as a wing half for West Ham United.

== Footballing career ==
Born in Sale, Cheshire, England, Wilson started playing for West Ham in 1944 in the wartime competition for League south of the Wartime League. Primarily a wing half, Wilson could play in any defensive position. He played only 39 times in his West Ham career in all competitions but only three in the Football League after the war had finished. His only 2 goals came on 24 March 1945 in a 3–1 win against Millwall. His final game was on 6 December 1947 in a 2–1 away defeat to Leeds United. After this Wilson retired from playing and coached for Hornchurch, Upminster, Aveley and Barking.
