= Tommy Dawson (footballer, born 1915) =

English footballer

Personal information
- Full name: Thomas Dawson
- Date of birth: 6 February 1915
- Place of birth: Middlesbrough, England
- Date of death: 20 December 1972 (aged 57)
- Place of death: Middlesbrough, England
- Height: 5 ft 11 in (1.80 m)
- Position: Inside forward

Senior career*
Years	Team	Apps	(Gls)
- South Bank
- Cargo Fleet
- Whitby United
- Spennymoor United
1934–1936	Whitby United		
1936–1938	Darlington	23	(3)
1938–1939	Spennymoor United		
1939–1947	Charlton Athletic	23	(2)
1947–1948	Brentford	36	(10)
1948–1950	Swindon Town	65	(15)
1950–1951	Chippenham Town		
- Bishop Auckland Auto Services
Total		147	(30)

Managerial career
- 1950–1951: Chippenham Town
- 1960: Adamstown Rosebud
- * Club domestic league appearances and goals

Thomas Dawson (6 February 1915 – 20 December 1972) was an English professional footballer who played as an inside forward in the Football League. He later moved to Australia and managed Adamstown Rosebud.

== Career statistics ==
Appearances and goals by club, season and competition
Club	Season	League			FA Cup		Total	
Club	Season	Division	Apps	Goals	Apps	Goals	Apps	Goals
Charlton Athletic	1938–39	First Division	1	0	―		1	0
Charlton Athletic	1946–47	First Division	22	2	1	0	23	2
Charlton Athletic	Total		23	2	1	0	24	2
Brentford	1947–48	Second Division	36	10	2	1	38	11
Swindon Town	1948–49	Third Division South	36	8	1	0	37	8
Swindon Town	1949–50	Third Division South	29	7	2	0	31	7
Swindon Town	Total		65	15	3	0	68	15
Career total			124	27	6	1	130	28

== Honours ==
Charlton Athletic

- FA Cup: 1946–47
