= Bill Naylor =

English footballer

Personal information
- Full name: William Henry Naylor
- Date of birth: 23 November 1919
- Place of birth: Sheffield, England
- Date of death: January 1989 (aged 69)
- Place of death: Sheffield, England
- Position: Inside forward

Youth career
- Hampton Sports

Senior career*
Years	Team	Apps	(Gls)
1939–1947	Crystal Palace	18	(9)
1947	Brentford	11	(2)
1947–1950	Leyton Orient	64	(14)
- Weymouth
- * Club domestic league appearances and goals

William Henry Naylor (23 November 1919 – January 1989), known early in his career as Bill Barke, was an English professional footballer who played as an inside forward in the Football League for Leyton Orient, Crystal Palace and Brentford. He top-scored for Crystal Palace during the 1946–47 season.

== Career statistics ==
Appearances and goals by club, season and competition
Club	Season	League			FA Cup		Total	
Club	Season	Division	Apps	Goals	Apps	Goals	Apps	Goals
Brentford	1946–47	First Division	11	2	—		11	2
Career total			11	2	0	0	11	2
