= Jack Chisholm =

English footballer

Personal information
- Full name: Jack Richardson Chisholm
- Date of birth: 9 October 1924
- Place of birth: Edmonton, England
- Date of death: 24 August 1977 (aged 52)
- Place of death: Leytonstone, England
- Position: Centre half

Youth career
- 1945–1946: Tottenham Hotspur

Senior career*
Years	Team	Apps	(Gls)
1946–1947	Tottenham Hotspur	2	(0)
1947–1948	Brentford	49	(1)
1948–1949	Sheffield United	21	(1)
1949–1954	Plymouth Argyle	176	(2)
Total		248	(4)
- * Club domestic league appearances and goals

Jack Richardson Chisholm (9 October 1924 – 24 August 1977) was an English footballer who played as a centre half.

Known for his leadership and physical presence, Chisholm is regarded as one of the best defenders to have played for Plymouth Argyle. He began his career as a teenager with Tottenham Hotspur but had to wait until after the Second World War to make his debut. He joined Brentford in 1947, where his performances earned him a move to Sheffield United the following year. He appeared for them in the First Division but was unable to prevent relegation at the end of the season, and he joined Plymouth Argyle six months later. Chisholm was soon appointed captain and helped them challenge for promotion to the First Division after returning to the second tier in 1952, as Third Division South champions. Injuries and lifestyle ended his career two years later; he had cartilage removed from both knees and was known to have a drink in a nearby pub before home matches. Nicknamed Jumbo due to his stature, Chisholm was inducted into the Plymouth Argyle Hall of Fame in 2004.

== Playing career ==
Born in Edmonton, London, Chisholm had to wait until after the Second World War (during which he served in the Irish Guards) to begin his professional career. He made two league appearances for Tottenham Hotspur in 1947 before being transferred to Brentford. He quickly established himself in the first team at Griffin Park, making 49 league appearances in little over a year. He then joined Sheffield United, where he made 21 appearances in the First Division. Chisholm then joined Second Division club Plymouth Argyle in December 1949 for £12,000, with the Pilgrims battling against relegation. He made his debut at Home Park in a 2–1 win over Chesterfield. It took them two seasons to regain their place in the Second Division, but they did it in style. Chisholm, now captain, led by example. He was never the most graceful or technical player, but he was a towering defender, strong in the air and a thunderous tackler. His ability to inspire his more talented teammates into action and his defensive ability made him an integral part of the team. With the club's main attacking threat coming from the trio of Maurice Tadman, George Dews and Alex Govan, the Pilgrims were crowned champions.

Back in the Second Division, Chisholm and the club went from strength to strength, matching their best ever league finish of 4th in the 1952–53 season. However, the next season was to be Chisholm's last for Argyle and his last as a professional footballer. His lifestyle wasn't ideal for a professional athlete; he enjoyed having a pre-match drink at the nearby Britannia Inn, and injuries also began to take their toll. He played his last game against Stoke City at the Victoria Ground on 26 April 1954. In all, he made 188 appearances for the Pilgrims, scoring 2 goals. Chisholm left a mark on everyone involved with the club at the time and is remembered to this day. In his honour the club named a hospitality suite at Home Park after him, calling it The Chisholm Lounge.

== Later life and death ==
Chisholm was a keen cricketer, along with teammate George Dews and played the game for various clubs during and after his football career. He played one match for Middlesex County Cricket Club in 1947, alongside top English players Denis Compton and Bill Edrich.

Jack Richardson Chisholm died in Leytonstone, London on 24 August 1977 at the age of 52, leaving a daughter, Sandra, and two grandchildren, Stewart and Samantha.

== Career statistics ==
Season	Club	League			FA Cup		Total	
Season	Club	Division	Apps	Goals	Apps	Goals	Apps	Goals
1946–47	Tottenham Hotspur	Second Division	0	0	0	0	0	0
1947–48	Tottenham Hotspur	Second Division	2	0	0	0	2	0
Total			2	0	0	0	2	0
1947–48	Brentford	Second Division	40	1	0	0	40	1
1948–49	Brentford	Second Division	9	0	0	0	9	0
Total			49	1	0	0	49	1
1948–49	Sheffield United	First Division	21	1	0	0	21	1
1949–50	Sheffield United	Second Division	0	0	0	0	0	0
Total			21	1	0	0	21	1
1949–50	Plymouth Argyle	Second Division	21	0	2	0	23	0
1950–51	Plymouth Argyle	Third Division South	39	0	4	0	43	0
1951–52	Plymouth Argyle	Third Division South	46	1	1	0	47	1
1952–53	Plymouth Argyle	Second Division	36	1	3	0	39	1
1953–54	Plymouth Argyle	Second Division	34	0	2	0	36	0
Total			176	2	12	0	188	2
Career			248	4	12	0	260	4

== Honours ==
Plymouth Argyle

- Football League Third Division South: 1951–52

Individual

- Plymouth Argyle Hall of Fame: 2004
- Plymouth Argyle Team of the Century: 2004
