= Roy Stroud =

English footballer

Personal information
- Full name: Roy William Stroud
- Date of birth: 16 March 1925
- Place of birth: Silvertown, England
- Date of death: 4 June 2015 (aged 90)
- Place of death: Devon, England
- Position: Outside right

Senior career*
Years	Team	Apps	(Gls)
1939–1952	Hendon		
1952–1957	West Ham United	13	(4)
1957–1958	Chelmsford City		

International career
- England Schoolboys
1948–1953	England Amateurs	9	(4)
- * Club domestic league appearances and goals

Roy William Stroud (15 March 1925 – 4 June 2015) was an English professional football inside right who played as an outside right for Hendon, West Ham United and Chelmsford City. He was capped by England at amateur level.

== Footballing career ==
Born in Silvertown, London, his parents moved to Hounslow when he was young. Stroud started playing with London and Middlesex boys before being selected for England boys as an outside right. During the Second World War he was a guest player for Arsenal and Brentford.

Stroud then played for Hendon before moving to West Ham in February 1952 and making his debut against Notts County on 14 April 1952. It was his only league appearance that season. He would have to wait over 18 months for his next appearance. In this game, on 7 November 1953, Stroud scored his first goal for West Ham in a 5–0 home win against Bury. He also scored in his next game, on 14 November 1953, a 3–1 away defeat by Oldham Athletic. His run of games amounted to only four that season, one in 1954–55, two in 1955–56 and five in his final season, 1956–57. He played only 15 times in his West Ham career in all competitions, scoring four goals before signing for Chelmsford City in 1957. On 8 November 1958, in a game against Yiewsley, Stroud suffered a broken leg, subsequently ending his playing career.

== Death ==
Stroud died on 4 June 2015 in Devon at age 90, having been suffering with dementia. He was the oldest surviving West Ham United player at the time of his death.
