= Jim Gotts =

English footballer (1917–1998)

Personal information
- Full name: James Atkinson Gotts
- Date of birth: 17 January 1917
- Place of birth: Seaton Delaval, England
- Date of death: December 1998 (aged 81)
- Place of death: Ealing, England
- Position: Forward

Youth career
- East Cramlington Black Watch

Senior career*
Years	Team	Apps	(Gls)
1935	East Cramlington Black Watch		
1935–193?	Ashington		
1946	Brentford	0	(0)
1946	→ Colchester United (guest)	0	(0)
1946–1947	Brighton & Hove Albion	2	(0)
Total		2	(0)
- * Club domestic league appearances and goals

James Atkinson Gotts (17 January 1917 – December 1998) was an English professional footballer who played in the Football League as an outside right for Brighton & Hove Albion. He played twice for Brentford in the 1945–46 FA Cup, appeared for Colchester United in the Southern League Cup, and played North-Eastern League football for Ashington.

== Career ==
James Atkinson Gotts was born on 17 January 1917 in Seaton Delaval, Northumberland. He attended Seaton Delaval School, with whose football team his goalscoring ability first became apparent. He joined East Cramlington Black Watch Juniors, where the 16-year-old "maintained his special forte of marksmanship" with 26 goals from 10 Bedlington and District Junior League matches in the first half of the 1933–34 season. Gotts scored in the first minute of the Bedlington Junior Cup final, which Cramlington won in front of scouts from several Football League clubs, and was reportedly "booked for a further look over".

That interest came to nothing, but he soon moved on to Ashington of the North-Eastern League, and was selected in "his proper position" of centre forward for their first team in late October 1935. He continued for a time in the first team, but appeared increasingly for the reserves in the latter part of 1936 and in 1937, and is known to have undergone knee surgery following a football injury.

Gotts served in the Royal Navy during the Second World War. In January 1946, he resumed his football career, signing professional forms with Brentford. He made four appearances and scored once in the Football League South wartime league, and played twice without scoring in the 1945–46 FA Cup, on 31 January in a 5–0 victory at home to Bristol City in the fourth round and nine days later in a 3–1 win away to Queens Park Rangers. Gotts played once as a guest for Colchester United, on 13 April in a Southern League Cup match in which Colchester won 5–2 away to Guildford City. According to the Essex County Standard, Gotts' "brilliant placing of the ball from long distances often led to shots rights on the target."

In June 1946, ahead of the Football League's post-war resumption, Gotts signed for Third Division South club Brighton & Hove Albion. His debut was delayed because of an injury sustained during pre-season, but he eventually made his first appearance in the Football League on 21 December, playing at outside right – characterised as a "lively winger" and one of seven players used in that position over the season – in a 3–1 defeat away to Torquay United. His second and last, a week later, was in an even heavier defeat away to Port Vale. He was released at the end of the season, and made no more appearances in League football.

Gotts died in Ealing, west London, in December 1998 at the age of 81.
