= Peter Buchanan (footballer, born 1915) =

Scottish footballer

Personal information
- Full name: Peter Symington Buchanan
- Date of birth: 13 October 1915
- Place of birth: Glasgow, Scotland
- Date of death: 26 June 1977 (aged 61)
- Place of death: Strathaven, Scotland
- Height: 5 ft 10 in (1.78 m)
- Position: Outside right

Senior career*
Years	Team	Apps	(Gls)
1932–1933	St Mungo's		
1933–1934	Chelsea	0	(0)
1934–1935	Wishaw Juniors		
1935–1946	Chelsea	39	(6)
1946–1947	Fulham	20	(1)
1947–1949	Brentford	74	(13)
1949–1950	Headington United	45	(10)
Total		178	(30)

International career
1937	Scotland	1	(1)
- * Club domestic league appearances and goals

Peter Symington Buchanan (13 October 1915 – 26 June 1977) was a Scottish footballer who played at both professional and international levels.

== Career ==
Buchanan played league football for Chelsea, Fulham and Brentford in The Football League, either side of the Second World War. During the war, Buchanan made guest appearances for several clubs including West Ham United, Southampton, for whom he made 11 appearances between 1942 and 1946, scoring twice, Aldershot, Portsmouth, Millwall, Crystal Palace and Fulham.

He earned one cap for Scotland, scoring in a 5–0 win against Czechoslovakia.

== Personal life ==
Buchanan was in a reserved occupation during the Second World War.
