= Ron Brown (footballer) =

Northern Ireland footballer (1923–1968)

Personal information
- Full name: Ronald Brown
- Date of birth: 20 March 1923
- Place of birth: Ballymoney, Northern Ireland
- Date of death: June 1968 (aged 45)
- Place of death: Nottingham, England
- Position: Centre forward

Senior career*
Years	Team	Apps	(Gls)
1945–1947	Plymouth Argyle	24	(17)
1947	Hull City	7	(3)
1947–1948	Linfield		
1948	Blackburn Rovers	0	(0)
1948	Brentford	0	(0)
- * Club domestic league appearances and goals

Ronald Brown (20 March 1923 – June 1968), sometimes known as Paddy Brown, was a Northern Irish professional footballer who played as a centre forward in the Football League for Hull City.

== Personal life ==
Brown served in the Royal Navy during the Second World War.

== Career statistics ==
Appearances and goals by club, season and competition
Club	Season	League			National Cup		Total	
Club	Season	Division	Apps	Goals	Apps	Goals	Apps	Goals
Hull City	1947–48	Third Division South	7	3	―		7	3
Career total			7	3	0	0	7	3
