= Maurice Roberts (footballer) =

English footballer

Personal information
- Full name: Maurice Ernest Stanley Roberts
- Date of birth: 5 July 1922
- Place of birth: Bristol, England
- Date of death: April 1993 (aged 70)
- Place of death: Bristol, England
- Position: Outside left

Senior career*
Years	Team	Apps	(Gls)
1946–1947	Brentford	10	(0)
1947	Bristol City	0	(0)
- * Club domestic league appearances and goals

Maurice Ernest Stanley Roberts (5 July 1922 – April 1993) was an English professional footballer who played in the Football League for Brentford as an outside left.

== Personal life ==
By February 1951, Roberts had recovered from a case of "sudden blindness".

== Career statistics ==
Appearances and goals by club, season and competition
Club	Season	League			FA Cup		Total	
Club	Season	Division	Apps	Goals	Apps	Goals	Apps	Goals
Brentford	1946–47	First Division	10	0	0	0	10	0
Career total			10	0	0	0	10	0
