= Cyril Toulouse =

English footballer

Personal information
- Full name: Cyril Harvey Toulouse
- Date of birth: 24 December 1923
- Place of birth: Acton, England
- Date of death: 22 January 1980 (aged 56)
- Place of death: Pembroke, Wales
- Position: Wing half

Senior career*
Years	Team	Apps	(Gls)
1946–1947	Brentford	13	(0)
1947–1948	Tottenham Hotspur	2	(0)
	Guildford City	?	(?)
1950–1954	Oxford United	152	(20)
- * Club domestic league appearances and goals

Cyril Harvey Toulouse (24 December 1923 in Acton – 22 January 1980) was an English professional footballer who played for Brentford, Tottenham Hotspur, Guildford City and Oxford United.

== Playing career ==
Toulouse joined Brentford from non-league St Cuthmans in May 1946. The wing half featured in 13 matches between 1946 and 1947. He signed for Tottenham Hotspur in December 1947 and made his debut for the Spurs in a fixture versus WBA on 11 September 1948. Toulouse played two senior matches for the White Hart Lane club. After leaving Tottenham he had a spell at Guildford City before joining Oxford United in 1950. Toulouse went on to feature in 152 matches and netting 20 goals between 1950 and 1954.
