= George Paterson (footballer, born 1914) =

Scottish footballer

Personal information
- Full name: George Denholm Paterson
- Date of birth: 26 September 1914
- Place of birth: Denny, Scotland
- Date of death: 25 December 1985 (aged 71)
- Place of death: New Zealand
- Position: Left half

Youth career
- Denny YMCA
- Carrowbank Juveniles
- –1932: Dunipace

Senior career*
| Years | Team | Apps | (Gls) |
| 1932–1946 | Celtic | 175 | (11) |
| 1946–1949 | Brentford | 62 | (0) |
| 1949–1951 | Yeovil and Petters United | ? | (?) |

International career
| 1935–1938 | Scottish League XI | 2 | (0) |
| 1938–1946 | Scotland | 2 | (0) |
| 1945–1946 | Scotland (wartime) | 2 | (0) |

Managerial career
- 1949–1951: Yeovil and Petters United
- 1951–1952: Stirling Albion
- * Club domestic league appearances and goals

George Denholm Paterson (26 September 1914 – 25 December 1985) was a Scottish international footballer.

Paterson started his senior career at Celtic, where he won two Scottish league championships and the Scottish Cup once. He then served in the Royal Air Force during the Second World War, while playing as a guest for Leicester City, Blackpool, Wolverhampton Wanderers, Tranmere Rovers and Arsenal. Paterson's career with Celtic came to an end after he incurred a three-month suspension for vociferously arguing with the referee (whom he felt was under the influence of alcohol) during Celtic's 1946 Victory Cup semi-final against rivals Rangers.

Paterson moved to England to sign for Brentford in a swap deal with Gerry McAloon, then became player-manager of Yeovil and Petters United. He then managed Stirling Albion for a season before working variously for Celtic as a reserve team trainer and a scout.

== Personal life ==
Paterson graduated from Glasgow University with an MA degree. At the time he signed for Brentford, Paterson was working as a technician at the London Film Company; he had a keen interest in the movie business. He later emigrated to New Zealand and died there in December 1985.
