= Harry Oliver (footballer) =

English footballer

Personal information
- Full name: Henry Spoors Oliver
- Date of birth: 16 February 1921
- Place of birth: Sunderland, England
- Date of death: 11 January 1994 (aged 72)
- Place of death: Sunderland, England
- Positions: Centre half; left back

Youth career
- Doxford Juniors
- Hylton Colliery Juniors
- Ditchburn Juniors
- –1936: Sunderland
- 1936–1937: Houghton Colliery Welfare

Senior career*
Years	Team	Apps	(Gls)
1937	Sheffield United	0	(0)
1937–1938	Hartlepools United	9	(0)
1938–1948	Brentford	18	(0)
1948–1952	Watford	122	(2)
1952–1956	Canterbury City		

International career
1935	England Schoolboys	1	(0)
- * Club domestic league appearances and goals

Henry Spoors Oliver (16 February 1921 – 11 January 1994) was an English professional footballer. He played at full back and centre half in the Football League for Hartlepools United, Brentford and Watford. He also played competitive football for Houghton Colliery Welfare and Canterbury City and represented England as a schoolboy.

== Career ==
Born in Sunderland, Oliver played for the England schoolboys team, as well as for Houghton Colliery Welfare. He joined Hartlepools United—then in the Football League Third Division North—as a 16-year-old, and turned professional shortly after his 17th birthday. However, he did not remain there for long; after only 9 league games Oliver transferred to Brentford, who at the time were in the First Division, in 1938 for a £1500 fee. Unfortunately for Oliver, the Football League was suspended in 1939 due to the Second World War, and did not resume until 1946. During this period he played guest wartime football for Leeds United and York City.

In the first two seasons following the resumption of peacetime football, Oliver made 18 league appearances for Brentford. He transferred to Watford for a fee of £2,000 in May 1948, although Benskins brewery paid the money on Watford's behalf. Under the management of Eddie Hapgood, Ron Gray and Haydn Green, Oliver made 122 Watford appearances in the Third Division South, and a further 6 in the FA Cup, scoring four penalties. He joined Canterbury City at the end of the 1951–52 season, and remained there until his retirement in 1956.

Oliver died in the city of his birth on 11 January 1994, aged 72.

== Personal life ==
Oliver served in the Merchant Navy during the Second World War.
