= 1953–54 Brentford F.C. season =

English football team season

Brentford
1953–54 season
- Chairman: Frank Davis
- Manager: Tommy Lawton (until September 1953); Fred Monk ( – 1 September October 1953; Bill Dodgin Sr. (from 1 October 1953)
- Stadium: Griffin Park
- Second Division: 21st (relegated)
- FA Cup: Third round
- Top goalscorer: League: Dudley (10); All: Dudley (11)
- Highest home attendance: 22,845
- Lowest home attendance: 10,652
- Average home league attendance: 15,626
Home colours

During the 1953–54 English football season, Brentford competed in the Football League Second Division. With Brentford in the relegation places, player-manager Tommy Lawton transferred out of the club in September 1953 and his replacement Bill Dodgin Sr. was unable to turn things round, which culminated in relegation to the Third Division South on the final day of the season. Brentford did not return to the second-tier of English football until the 1992–93 season.

== Season summary ==
Without a transfer budget to speak of, Brentford player-manager Tommy Lawton could not rely entirely on filling his squad with the products of Alf Bew's youth team, which had reached the semi-finals of the inaugural FA Youth Cup during the previous season. Lawton again relied on Wally Bragg and Ken Coote to hold two of the half back berths alongside Tony Harper. He signed ageing forwards Frank Broome and Ian McPherson from his previous club Notts County as replacements for Les Smith and the injured Jimmy D'Arcy.

Six defeats and just one win from the opening 9 Second Division matches saw Tommy Lawton quit the club in favour of a £10,000 transfer to Arsenal, a deal which saw James Robertson arrive at Griffin Park in part-exchange. Full back Fred Monk took over as caretaker manager until the appointment of Bill Dodgin Sr. on 1 October 1953. Dodgin's arrival heralded three consecutive wins, which lifted the Bees out of the relegation places. Ineffective forwards Broome and McPherson were transferred out and replaced by Cardiff City's Johnny Rainford and Frank Dudley. Despite their arrivals, Brentford showed poor form over the Christmas and New Year period and a money-raising FA Cup run ended in a third round replay defeat to Hull City. Gerry Gazzard arrived on loan from West Ham United in January 1954 and despite Gazzard and Dudley forming something of a strike partnership during the final 10 weeks of the season, Brentford were relegated in 21st-place after the club's final match on 24 April.

The solitary away league win during the season tied the club record for fewest away league wins in a season. In addition, Brentford were the joint-lowest scorers in the Second Division during the season. Long-serving trainer Jack Cartmell retired at the end of the season, after over 30 years on the staff at Griffin Park.

== League table ==
Pos	Team	Pld	W	D	L	GF	GA	GAv	Pts	Qualification or relegation
18	Derby County	42	12	11	19	64	82	0.780	35	
19	Plymouth Argyle	42	9	16	17	65	82	0.793	34	
20	Swansea Town	42	13	8	21	58	82	0.707	34	
21	Brentford (R)	42	10	11	21	40	78	0.513	31	Relegation to the Third Division South
22	Oldham Athletic (R)	42	8	9	25	40	89	0.449	25	Relegation to the Third Division North

Rules for classification: 1) Points; 2) Goal average; 3) Goals scored
(R) Relegated

== Results ==
Brentford's goal tally listed first.

=== Legend ===
Win	Draw	Loss

=== Football League Second Division ===
No.	Date	Opponent	Venue	Result	Attendance	Scorer(s)
1	19 August 1953	Stoke City	A	1–1	22,413	Broome
2	22 August 1953	Derby County	A	1–4	18,927	Lawton
3	27 August 1953	Blackburn Rovers	H	1–4	16,682	Ledgerton
4	29 August 1953	Fulham	H	2–1	21,689	Monk (pen), Goodwin
5	31 August 1953	Blackburn Rovers	A	2–2	11,793	Dare (2)
6	5 September 1953	Bristol Rovers	H	0–3	21,158	
7	10 September 1953	Doncaster Rovers	H	1–4	14,047	Lawton
8	12 September 1953	Lincoln City	A	1–2	16,592	Harper
9	16 September 1953	Doncaster Rovers	A	0–3	19,463	
10	19 September 1953	Notts County	H	0–0	12,770	
11	26 September 1953	Hull City	A	0–2	19,501	
12	3 October 1953	Everton	H	1–0	17,367	Dare
13	10 October 1953	West Ham United	A	1–0	24,934	Bloomfield
14	17 October 1953	Leeds United	H	2–1	18,329	Dare, Bloomfield
15	24 October 1953	Birmingham City	A	1–5	23,582	Dare
16	31 October 1953	Nottingham Forest	H	1–1	15,384	Rainford
17	7 November 1953	Luton Town	A	1–1	15,167	Robertson
18	14 November 1953	Plymouth Argyle	H	1–0	17,327	Dare
19	21 November 1953	Swansea Town	A	0–1	16,627	
20	28 November 1953	Rotherham United	H	0–1	16,740	
21	5 December 1953	Leicester City	A	0–6	24,036	
22	12 December 1953	Stoke City	H	0–0	11,848	
23	19 December 1953	Derby County	H	0–0	10,652	
24	25 December 1953	Oldham Athletic	H	3–1	15,309	Rainford, Dudley, Bloomfield
25	26 December 1953	Oldham Athletic	A	0–2	14,414	
26	2 January 1954	Fulham	A	1–4	24,372	Dudley
27	16 January 1954	Bristol Rovers	A	0–0	20,541	
28	23 January 1954	Lincoln City	H	0–1	11,431	
29	30 January 1954	Bury	A	1–1	9,035	Robertson
30	6 February 1954	Notts County	A	0–2	10,507	
31	13 February 1954	Hull City	H	2–2	11,522	Gazzard (2)
32	24 February 1954	Everton	A	1–6	23,145	Gazzard
33	27 February 1954	West Ham United	H	3–1	16,458	Gazzard, Dudley, Dare
34	6 March 1954	Leeds United	A	0–4	16,501	
35	13 March 1954	Birmingham City	H	2–0	12,584	Dudley (2)
36	20 March 1954	Nottingham Forest	A	1–2	15,700	Dudley
37	27 March 1954	Swansea Town	H	3–1	14,023	Gazzard, Robertson, Dudley
38	3 April 1954	Rotherham United	A	1–1	9,198	Bragg
39	10 April 1954	Luton Town	H	0–1	14,204	
40	16 April 1954	Bury	H	2–1	15,768	Gazzard (pen), Dudley
41	17 April 1954	Plymouth Argyle	A	2–3	23,405	Dudley, Robertson
42	24 April 1954	Leicester City	H	1–3	22,845	Dudley

=== FA Cup ===
Round	Date	Opponent	Venue	Result	Attendance	Scorer(s)	Notes
3R	9 January 1954	Hull City	H	0–0	16,000		
3R (replay)	14 January 1954	Hull City	A	2–2	16,000	Dudley, Rainford	
3R (2nd replay)	18 January 1954	Hull City	N	2–5	10,150	Bly (og), Sperrin	(Note: Match played at Belle Vue, Doncaster.)

- Sources: 100 Years Of Brentford, Statto, 11v11

== Playing squad ==
Players' ages are as of the opening day of the 1953–54 season.

Pos.	Name	Nat.	Date of birth (age)	Signed from	Signed in	Notes
Goalkeepers						
GK	Alf Jefferies	(England)	9 February 1922 (aged 31)	Oxford City	1945	
GK	Reg Newton	(England)	30 June 1926 (aged 27)	Leyton Orient	1949	
Defenders						
DF	Alan Bassham	(England)	3 October 1933 (aged 19)	Youth	1953	
DF	Ken Horne	(England)	25 June 1926 (aged 27)	Blackpool	1950	
DF	Frank Latimer	(England)	3 October 1923 (aged 29)	Snowdown Colliery Welfare	1945	
DF	George Lowden	(England)	2 March 1933 (aged 20)	Unattached	1951	
DF	Fred Monk (c)	(England)	9 October 1920 (aged 32)	Guildford City	1948	Caretaker manager
Midfielders						
HB	Wally Bragg	(England)	8 July 1929 (aged 24)	Twickenham Celtic	1946	
HB	George Bristow	(England)	25 June 1933 (aged 20)	Youth	1950	
HB	Ken Coote	(England)	19 May 1928 (aged 25)	Wembley	1949	
HB	Ian Dargie	(England)	3 October 1931 (aged 21)	Tonbridge	1952	
HB	Tony Harper	(England)	26 May 1925 (aged 28)	Headington United	1948	
Forwards						
FW	Vernon Avis	(England)	24 October 1935 (aged 17)	Youth	1952	
FW	Jimmy Bloomfield	(England)	15 February 1934 (aged 19)	Hayes	1952	
FW	Billy Dare	(England)	14 February 1927 (aged 26)	Hendon	1948	
FW	Frank Dudley	(England)	9 May 1925 (aged 28)	Cardiff City	1953	
FW	Gerry Gazzard	(England)	15 March 1925 (aged 28)	West Ham United	1954	On loan from West Ham United
FW	Jackie Goodwin	(England)	29 September 1920 (aged 32)	Birmingham City	1949	
FW	Terry Ledgerton	(England)	7 October 1930 (aged 22)	Huyton	1950	
FW	Johnny Rainford	(England)	11 December 1930 (aged 22)	Cardiff City	1953	
FW	James Robertson	(Scotland)	20 February 1929 (aged 24)	Arsenal	1953	
FW	Billy Sperrin	(England)	9 April 1922 (aged 31)	Guildford City	1949	
Players who left the club mid-season
FW	Frank Broome	(England)	11 June 1915 (aged 38)	Notts County	1953	Transferred to Crewe Alexandra
FW	Tommy Lawton (c)	(England)	6 October 1919 (aged 33)	Notts County	1952	Manager, transferred to Arsenal
FW	Ian McPherson	(Scotland)	26 July 1920 (aged 33)	Notts County	1953	Transferred to Bedford Town

- Sources: 100 Years Of Brentford, Timeless Bees

== Coaching staff ==
=== Tommy Lawton (19 August – September 1953) ===
Name	Role
(England) Tommy Lawton	Player-Manager
(Scotland) Jimmy Bain	Assistant Manager
(England) David Richards	Trainer
(England) Jack Cartmell	Assistant Trainer

=== Fred Monk ( – 1 September October 1953) ===
Name	Role
(England) Fred Monk	Player-Manager
(Scotland) Jimmy Bain	Assistant Manager
(England) David Richards	Trainer
(England) Jack Cartmell	Assistant Trainer

=== Bill Dodgin Sr. (1 October 1953 – 24 April 1954) ===
Name	Role
(England) Bill Dodgin Sr.	Manager
(Scotland) Jimmy Bain	Assistant Manager
(England) David Richards	Trainer
(England) Jack Cartmell	Assistant Trainer

== Statistics ==
=== Appearances and goals ===

Brentford's highest appearance-makers in each position during the Football League season.

Pos	Nat	Name	League		FA Cup		Total	
Pos	Nat	Name	Apps	Goals	Apps	Goals	Apps	Goals
GK	(England)	Alf Jefferies	3	0	0	0	3	0
GK	(England)	Reg Newton	39	0	3	0	42	0
DF	(England)	Alan Bassham	2	0	0	0	2	0
DF	(England)	Ken Horne	10	0	0	0	10	0
DF	(England)	Frank Latimer	36	0	3	0	39	0
DF	(England)	George Lowden	1	0	0	0	1	0
DF	(England)	Fred Monk	23	1	2	0	25	1
HB	(England)	Wally Bragg	41	1	3	0	44	1
HB	(England)	George Bristow	24	0	3	0	27	0
HB	(England)	Ken Coote	40	0	3	0	43	0
HB	(England)	Ian Dargie	14	0	1	0	15	0
HB	(England)	Tony Harper	26	1	0	0	26	1
FW	(England)	Vernon Avis	1	0	0	0	1	0
FW	(England)	Jimmy Bloomfield	27	3	2	0	29	3
FW	(England)	Frank Broome	6	1	—		6	1
FW	(England)	Billy Dare	38	7	2	0	40	7
FW	(England)	Frank Dudley	20	10	3	1	23	11
FW	(England)	Jackie Goodwin	19	1	1	0	20	1
FW	(England)	Tommy Lawton	6	2	—		6	2
FW	(England)	Terry Ledgerton	7	1	3	0	10	1
FW	(Scotland)	Ian McPherson	4	0	—		4	0
FW	(England)	Johnny Rainford	29	2	3	1	32	3
FW	(Scotland)	James Robertson	31	4	0	0	31	4
FW	(England)	Billy Sperrin	2	0	1	1	3	1
Players loaned in during the season
FW	(England)	Gerry Gazzard	13	6	—		13	6

- Players listed in italics left the club mid-season.
- Source: 100 Years Of Brentford

=== Goalscorers ===
Pos.	Nat	Player	FL2	FAC	Total
FW	(England)	Frank Dudley	10	1	11
FW	(England)	Billy Dare	7	0	7
FW	(England)	Gerry Gazzard	6	—	6
FW	(Scotland)	James Robertson	4	0	4
FW	(England)	Jimmy Bloomfield	3	0	3
FW	(England)	Johnny Rainford	2	1	3
FW	(England)	Tommy Lawton	2	—	2
FW	(England)	Frank Broome	1	—	1
HB	(England)	Wally Bragg	1	0	1
FW	(England)	Jackie Goodwin	1	0	1
HB	(England)	Tony Harper	1	0	1
FW	(England)	Terry Ledgerton	1	0	1
DF	(England)	Fred Monk	1	0	1
FW	(England)	Billy Sperrin	0	1	1
Opponents			0	1	1
Total			40	4	44

- Players listed in italics left the club mid-season.
- Source: 100 Years Of Brentford

=== Management ===
Name	Nat	From	To	Record All Comps					Record League				
Name	Nat	From	To	P	W	D	L	W %	P	W	D	L	W %
Tommy Lawton	(England)	19 August 1953	16 September 1953	9	1	2	6	11.11	9	1	2	6	11.11
Fred Monk (caretaker)	(England)	19 September 1953	26 September 1953	2	0	1	1	0.00	2	0	1	1	0.00
Bill Dodgin Sr.	(England)	3 October 1953	24 April 1954	34	9	10	15	26.47	31	9	8	14	29.03

=== Summary ===
Games played	45 (42 Second Division, 3 FA Cup)
Games won	10 (10 Second Division, 0 FA Cup)
Games drawn	13 (11 Second Division, 2 FA Cup)
Games lost	22 (21 Second Division, 1 FA Cup)
Goals scored	44 (40 Second Division, 4 FA Cup)
Goals conceded	85 (78 Second Division, 7 FA Cup)
Clean sheets	9 (8 Second Division, 1 FA Cup)
Biggest league win	2–0 versus Birmingham City, 13 March 1954; 3–1 on three occasions
Worst league defeat	6–0 versus Leicester City, 5 December 1953
Most appearances	44, Wally Bragg (41 Second Division, 3 FA Cup)
Top scorer (league)	10, Frank Dudley
Top scorer (all competitions)	11, Frank Dudley

== Transfers & loans ==
Players transferred in
Date	Pos.	Name	Previous club	Fee	Ref.
July 1953	FW	(England) Frank Broome	(England) Notts County	n/a	
July 1953	FW	(Scotland) Ian McPherson	(England) Notts County	n/a	
August 1953	DF	(England) Ken Moffitt	(Scotland) Berwick Rangers	n/a	
September 1953	FW	(Scotland) James Robertson	(England) Arsenal	Part-exchange	
October 1953	FW	(England) Johnny Rainford	(Wales) Cardiff City	n/a	
December 1953	FW	(England) Frank Dudley	(Wales) Cardiff City	n/a	
Players loaned in
Date from	Pos.	Name	From	Date to	Ref.
January 1954	FW	(England) Gerry Gazzard	(England) West Ham United	End of season	
Players transferred out
Date	Pos.	Name	Subsequent club	Fee	Ref.
3 June 1953	FW	(England) Micky Bull	(England) Swindon Town	n/a	
July 1953	GK	(Wales) Dave Jones	(England) Reading	n/a	
July 1953	DF	(Wales) Tecwyn Jones	(Wales) Wrexham	n/a	
August 1953	FW	(England) Les Smith	(England) Kidderminster Harriers	n/a	
September 1953	FW	(England) Tommy Lawton	(England) Arsenal	£10,000	
October 1953	FW	(England) Frank Broome	(England) Crewe Alexandra	n/a	
1953	FW	(Scotland) Ian McPherson	(England) Bedford Town	n/a	
Players released
Date	Pos.	Name	Subsequent club	Join date	Ref.
January 1954	FW	(Northern Ireland) Jimmy D'Arcy	Retired		
April 1954	FW	(England) Verdi Godwin	(England) Southport	July 1954	
April 1954	FW	(England) Jackie Goodwin	(England) Dartford	n/a	
April 1954	DF	(England) Fred Monk	(England) Aldershot	July 1954	
