= 1949–50 Brentford F.C. season =

English football team season

Brentford
1949–50 season
- Chairman: Frank Davis
- Secretary-Manager: Jackie Gibbons
- Stadium: Griffin Park
- Second Division: 9th
- FA Cup: Fourth round
- Top goalscorer: League: Dare (14); All: Dare (14)
- Highest home attendance: 38,000
- Lowest home attendance: 16,514
- Average home league attendance: 22,613
Home colours

During the 1949–50 English football season, Brentford competed in the Football League Second Division. In his first season as manager, Jackie Gibbons guided the club to a 9th-place finish, a marked improvement on near-relegations in the previous two seasons.

== Season summary ==
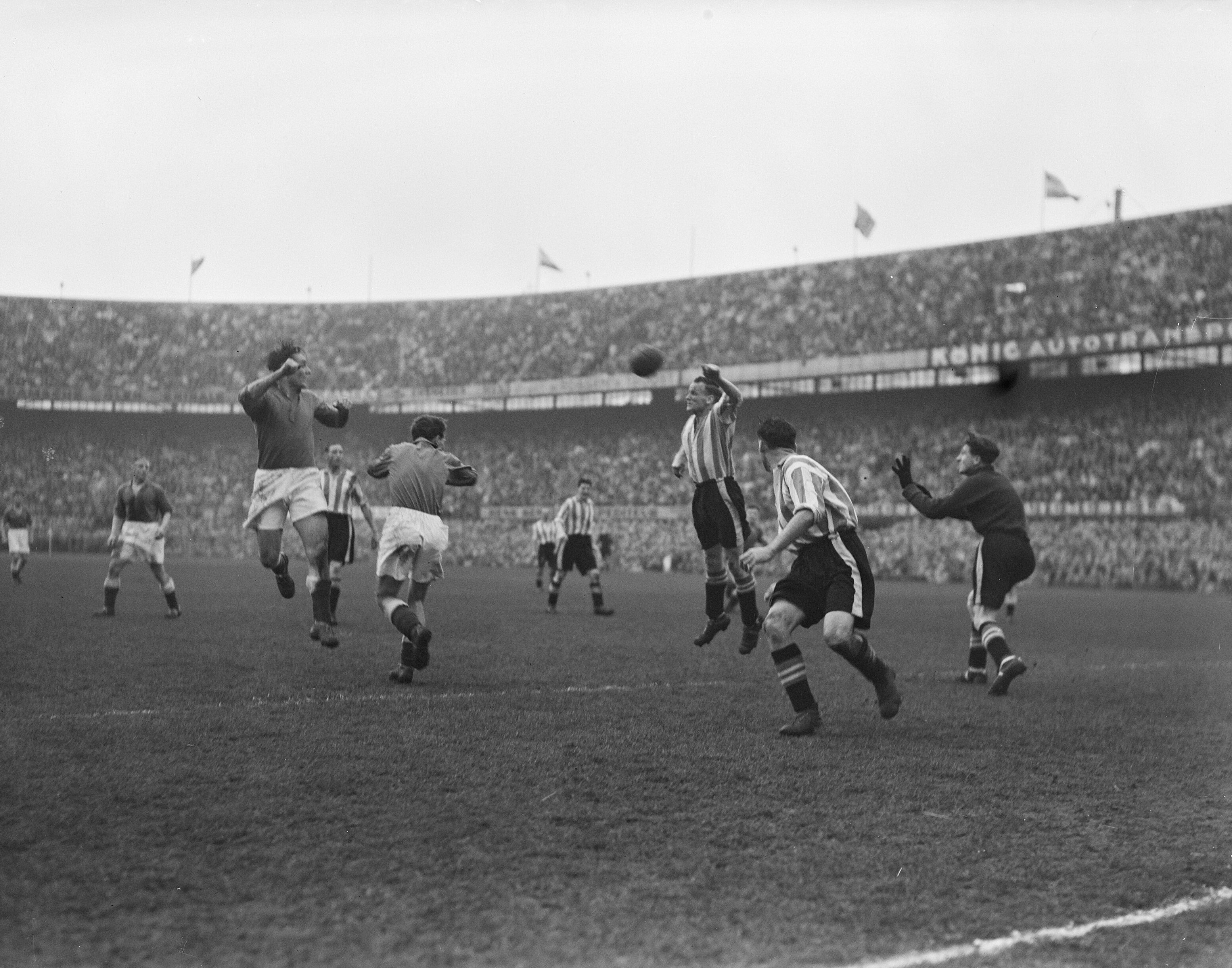
Brentford drew 0–0 in a friendly match played versus the Netherlands on 29 March 1950. 60,000 attended the fixture at De Kuip in Rotterdam.

1949–50 marked the first season since 1925–26 that Brentford would play a full season under the management of someone other than Harry Curtis, with former player Jackie Gibbons having taken over as manager in February 1949. A new-look squad toured Sweden under Gibbons in pre-season, with new forward signings Ken Coote, Jimmy Hill and Dennis Rampling in attendance. Joe Crozier, the club's near-ever-present goalkeeper since September 1937, elected to retire from full-time football and was replaced by his backups, firstly Ted Gaskell and then Alf Jefferies.

Brentford had a mixed season in the Second Division, with just three victories in the opening 15 matches leaving the club out of contention for challenging for promotion. A turnaround in form elevated the Bees from 21st place on 5 November 1949, to a season-high 7th on 8 April 1950. Two losses, a win and a draw from the final four matches dropped the club a final position of 9th. Brentford finished the campaign having conceded only 12 league goals at Griffin Park, the best home record in each of the top two divisions.

== League table ==
Pos	Team	Pld	W	D	L	GF	GA	GAv	Pts
7	Hull City	42	17	11	14	64	72	0.889	45
8	Swansea Town	42	17	9	16	53	49	1.082	43
9	Brentford	42	15	13	14	44	49	0.898	43
10	Cardiff City	42	16	10	16	41	44	0.932	42
11	Grimsby Town	42	16	8	18	74	73	1.014	40

Rules for classification: 1) Points; 2) Goal average; 3) Goals scored

== Results ==
Brentford's goal tally listed first.

=== Legend ===
Win	Draw	Loss

Friendlies

Date	Opponent	Venue	Result	Attendance
29 March 1950	Netherlands	A	0–0	60,000

=== Football League Second Division ===
No.	Date	Opponent	Venue	Result	Attendance	Scorer(s)
1	20 August 1949	Tottenham Hotspur	H	1–4	32,702	Manley (pen)
2	24 August 1949	Queens Park Rangers	A	3–3	20,931	Dare (2), Monk
3	27 August 1949	Bury	A	2–1	16,116	Woodward, Dare
4	31 August 1949	Queens Park Rangers	H	0–2	25,741	
5	3 September 1949	Leicester City	H	0–1	20,302	
6	10 September 1949	Bradford Park Avenue	A	2–0	12,754	Goodwin, Paton
7	14 September 1949	Blackburn Rovers	H	2–0	19,889	Dare, Paton
8	17 September 1949	Chesterfield	H	0–0	25,270	
9	19 September 1949	Blackburn Rovers	A	1–4	18,613	Coote
10	24 September 1949	Plymouth Argyle	A	0–2	17,088	
11	1 October 1949	Sheffield Wednesday	H	1–1	25,270	Goodwin
12	8 October 1949	Preston North End	A	0–2	30,178	
13	15 October 1949	Swansea Town	H	0–0	23,871	
14	22 October 1949	Leeds United	A	0–1	27,342	
15	29 October 1949	Southampton	H	0–1	21,694	
16	5 November 1949	Coventry City	A	1–1	16,110	Woodward
17	12 November 1949	Luton Town	H	1–0	20,520	Sperrin
18	19 November 1949	Barnsley	A	1–0	14,942	Woodward
19	26 November 1949	West Ham United	H	0–2	21,887	
20	3 December 1949	Sheffield United	A	1–1	20,649	Dare
21	10 December 1949	Grimsby Town	A	1–0	16,384	Girling
22	17 December 1949	Tottenham Hotspur	A	1–1	49,297	Sperrin
23	24 December 1949	Bury	H	2–0	17,401	Dare (2)
24	26 December 1949	Hull City	H	3–1	33,791	Dare, Sperrin, Goodwin
25	27 December 1949	Hull City	A	0–2	48,447	
26	31 December 1949	Leicester City	A	1–1	31,919	Dare
27	14 January 1950	Bradford Park Avenue	H	2–0	19,781	Coote, Paton
28	21 January 1950	Chesterfield	A	1–3	12,075	Coote
29	4 February 1950	Plymouth Argyle	H	0–0	22,313	
30	18 February 1950	Sheffield Wednesday	A	3–3	37,923	Pointon, Hill, Dare
31	25 February 1950	Preston North End	H	1–0	25,387	Goodwin
32	4 March 1950	Swansea Town	A	0–3	21,239	
33	11 March 1950	Leeds United	H	0–0	22,231	
34	18 March 1950	Southampton	A	3–2	22,429	Paton, Dare, Mallett (og)
35	25 March 1950	Coventry City	H	2–0	16,921	Goodwin, Dare
36	1 April 1950	West Ham United	A	2–2	18,826	Manley (pen), Pointon
37	7 April 1950	Cardiff City	H	1–0	24,584	Goodwin
38	8 April 1950	Sheffield United	H	1–0	22,411	Dare
39	10 April 1950	Cardiff City	A	0–0	16,260	
40	15 April 1950	Luton Town	A	0–1	13,991	
41	22 April 1950	Barnsley	H	3–0	16,514	Pointon, Hill, Dare
42	29 April 1950	Grimsby Town	A	1–4	11,253	Garneys

=== FA Cup ===
Round	Date	Opponent	Venue	Result	Attendance
3R	7 January 1950	Chelsea	H	0–1	38,000

- Sources: Statto, 11v11, 100 Years Of Brentford

== Playing squad ==
Players' ages are as of the opening day of the 1949–50 season.

Pos.	Name	Nat.	Date of birth (age)	Signed from	Signed in	Notes
Goalkeepers						
GK	Ted Gaskell	(England)	19 December 1916 (aged 32)	Buxton	1937	
GK	Alf Jefferies	(England)	9 February 1922 (aged 27)	Oxford City	1945	
GK	Reg Newton	(England)	30 June 1926 (aged 23)	Leyton Orient	1949	
Defenders						
DF	Bill Gorman	(Republic of Ireland)	13 January 1911 (aged 38)	Bury	1938	
DF	Fred Monk	(England)	9 October 1920 (aged 28)	Guildford City	1948	
DF	Roddy Munro	(Scotland)	27 July 1920 (aged 29)	Rangers	1946	
DF	Wally Quinton	(England)	13 December 1917 (aged 31)	Birmingham City	1949	
Midfielders						
HB	Ron Greenwood	(England)	11 November 1921 (aged 27)	Bradford Park Avenue	1949	
HB	Frank Latimer	(England)	3 October 1923 (aged 25)	Snowdown Colliery Welfare	1945	
HB	Tom Manley	(England)	7 October 1912 (aged 36)	Manchester United	1939	
Forwards						
FW	Jimmy Anders	(England)	8 March 1928 (aged 21)	Preston North End	1948	
FW	Ken Coote	(England)	19 May 1928 (aged 21)	Wembley	1949	
FW	Billy Dare	(England)	14 February 1927 (aged 22)	Hendon	1948	
FW	Tom Garneys	(England)	25 August 1923 (aged 25)	Chingford Town	1949	
FW	Dickie Girling	(England)	24 May 1922 (aged 27)	Crystal Palace	1947	
FW	Jackie Goodwin	(England)	29 September 1920 (aged 28)	Birmingham City	1949	
FW	Jimmy Hill	(England)	22 July 1928 (aged 21)	Reading	1949	
FW	Doug Keene	(England)	30 August 1928 (aged 20)	Kingsbury Town	1946	
FW	Kevin O'Flanagan	(Republic of Ireland)	10 June 1919 (aged 30)	Barnet	1949	Amateur
FW	Johnny Paton	(Scotland)	2 April 1923 (aged 26)	Celtic	1949	
FW	Bill Pointon	(England)	25 November 1920 (aged 28)	Queens Park Rangers	1950	
FW	Dennis Rampling	(England)	25 November 1923 (aged 25)	Bournemouth & Boscombe Athletic	1949	
FW	Billy Sperrin	(England)	9 April 1922 (aged 27)	Guildford City	1949	
Players who left the club mid-season
HB	David Nelson	(Scotland)	3 February 1918 (aged 31)	Fulham	1947	Transferred to Queens Park Rangers
HB	George Paterson	(Scotland)	26 September 1914 (aged 34)	Celtic	1946	Transferred to Yeovil Town
FW	Viv Woodward	(Wales)	25 May 1914 (aged 35)	Millwall	1948	Transferred to Aldershot

- Sources: 100 Years Of Brentford, Timeless Bees

== Coaching staff ==
Name	Role
(England) Jackie Gibbons	Secretary-Manager
(Scotland) Jimmy Bain	Assistant Manager
(Scotland) Malky MacDonald	Trainer
(England) Jack Cartmell	Assistant Trainer

== Statistics ==
=== Appearances and goals ===

Brentford's highest appearance-makers in each position during the Football League season.

Pos	Nat	Name	League		FA Cup		Total	
Pos	Nat	Name	Apps	Goals	Apps	Goals	Apps	Goals
GK	(England)	Ted Gaskell	14	0	0	0	14	0
GK	(England)	Alf Jefferies	26	0	1	0	27	0
GK	(England)	Reg Newton	2	0	0	0	2	0
DF	(Republic of Ireland)	Bill Gorman	8	0	0	0	8	0
DF	(England)	Fred Monk	25	1	1	0	26	1
DF	(Scotland)	Roddy Munro	19	0	0	0	19	0
DF	(England)	Wally Quinton	36	0	1	0	37	0
HB	(England)	Ron Greenwood	42	0	1	0	43	0
HB	(England)	Frank Latimer	22	0	1	0	23	0
HB	(England)	Tom Manley	33	2	0	0	33	2
HB	(Scotland)	David Nelson	26	0	1	0	27	0
HB	(Scotland)	George Paterson	3	0	—		3	0
FW	(England)	Jimmy Anders	9	0	1	0	10	0
FW	(England)	Ken Coote	20	3	0	0	20	3
FW	(England)	Billy Dare	41	14	1	0	42	14
FW	(England)	Tom Garneys	1	1	0	0	1	1
FW	(England)	Dickie Girling	14	1	0	0	14	1
FW	(England)	Jackie Goodwin	36	6	1	0	37	6
FW	(England)	Jimmy Hill	18	2	0	0	18	2
FW	(England)	Doug Keene	1	0	0	0	1	0
FW	(Republic of Ireland)	Kevin O'Flanagan	6	0	1	0	7	0
FW	(Scotland)	Johnny Paton	23	5	0	0	23	5
FW	(England)	Bill Pointon	12	2	0	0	12	2
FW	(England)	Dennis Rampling	1	0	0	0	1	0
FW	(England)	Billy Sperrin	14	3	1	0	15	3
FW	(Wales)	Viv Woodward	10	3	0	0	10	3

- Players listed in italics left the club mid-season.
- Source: 100 Years Of Brentford

=== Goalscorers ===
Pos.	Nat	Player	FL2	FAC	Total
FW	(England)	Billy Dare	14	0	14
FW	(England)	Jackie Goodwin	6	0	6
FW	(Scotland)	Johnny Paton	5	0	5
FW	(England)	Ken Coote	3	0	3
FW	(England)	Billy Sperrin	3	0	3
FW	(Wales)	Viv Woodward	3	0	3
FW	(England)	Jimmy Hill	2	0	2
HB	(England)	Tom Manley	2	0	2
FW	(England)	Bill Pointon	2	0	2
FW	(England)	Tom Garneys	1	0	1
FW	(England)	Dickie Girling	1	0	1
DF	(England)	Fred Monk	1	0	1
Opponents			1	0	1
Total			44	0	44

- Players listed in italics left the club mid-season.
- Source: 100 Years Of Brentford

=== Amateur international caps ===
Pos.	Nat	Player	Caps	Goals	Ref
FW	(Republic of Ireland)	Kevin O'Flanagan	1	1	

=== Management ===
Name	Nat	From	To	Record All Comps					Record League				
Name	Nat	From	To	P	W	D	L	W %	P	W	D	L	W %
Jackie Gibbons	(England)	20 August 1949	29 April 1950	43	15	13	15	34.88	42	15	13	14	35.71

=== Summary ===
Games played	43 (42 Second Division, 1 FA Cup)
Games won	15 (15 Second Division, 0 FA Cup)
Games drawn	13 (13 Second Division, 0 FA Cup)
Games lost	15 (14 Second Division, 1 FA Cup)
Goals scored	44 (44 Second Division, 0 FA Cup)
Goals conceded	51 (49 Second Division, 2 FA Cup)
Clean sheets	17 (17 Second Division, 0 FA Cup)
Biggest league win	3–0 versus Barnsley, 22 April 1950
Worst league defeat	4–1 on three occasions
Most appearances	43, Ron Greenwood (42 Second Division, 1 FA Cup)
Top scorer (league)	14, Billy Dare
Top scorer (all competitions)	14, Billy Dare

== Transfers & loans ==
Cricketers are not included in this list.

Players transferred in
Date	Pos.	Name	Previous club	Fee	Ref.
9 May 1949	FW	(England) Dennis Rampling	(England) Bournemouth & Boscombe Athletic	n/a	
May 1949	FW	(England) Jimmy Hill	(England) Reading	n/a	
July 1949	GK	(England) Reg Newton	(England) Leyton Orient	Part-exchange	
September 1949	FW	(Scotland) Jack Jordan	(England) Reading	n/a	
September 1949	FW	(Scotland) Johnny Paton	(Scotland) Celtic	£5,000	
September 1949	FW	(England) Billy Sperrin	(England) Guildford City	n/a	
November 1949	FW	(Republic of Ireland) Kevin O'Flanagan	(England) Barnet	Amateur	
24 December 1949	FW	(England) Tom Garneys	(England) Chingford Town	£750	
1949	FW	(England) George Francis	Unattached	n/a	
1949	FW	(England) Dennis Heath	(England) Alexandra Villa	n/a	
February 1950	FW	(England) Eddie Brown	n/a	n/a	
February 1950	FW	(England) Bill Pointon	(England) Queens Park Rangers	Exchange	
March 1950	DF	(Wales) Tecwyn Jones	(England) Holywell Town	Free	
Players transferred out
Date	Pos.	Name	Subsequent club	Fee	Ref.
May 1949	FW	(Scotland) Peter McKennan	(England) Middlesbrough	£9,000	
July 1949	FW	(England) Alan Smith	(England) Leyton Orient	Part-exchange	
1949	HB	(Scotland) George Paterson	(England) Queens Park Rangers	n/a	
February 1950	HB	(Scotland) David Nelson	(England) Queens Park Rangers	Exchange	
February 1950	FW	(Wales) Viv Woodward	(England) Aldershot	n/a	
Players released
Date	Pos.	Name	Subsequent club	Join date	Ref.
September 1949	DF	(Scotland) Malky MacDonald	Retired		
May 1950	FW	(England) Eddie Brown	(England) Torquay United	August 1950	
May 1950	FW	(England) Les Devonshire	(England) Chester	June 1950	
May 1950	DF	(England) Doug Keene	(England) Brighton & Hove Albion	June 1950	
May 1950	FW	(Republic of Ireland) Kevin O'Flanagan	Retired		
May 1950	FW	(England) Dennis Rampling	(England) Weymouth	1950	
