= 1951–52 Brentford F.C. season =

English football team season

Brentford
1951–52 season
- Chairman: Frank Davis
- Secretary-Manager: Jackie Gibbons
- Stadium: Griffin Park
- Second Division: 10th
- FA Cup: Fourth round
- Top goalscorer: League: Dare (14); All: Dare (16)
- Highest home attendance: 35,827
- Lowest home attendance: 10,243
- Average home league attendance: 23,022
Home colours

During the 1951–52 English football season, Brentford competed in the Football League Second Division. The Bees secured a third-consecutive top 10 finish and reached the fourth round of the FA Cup, taking Luton Town to two replays before being knocked out.

== Season summary ==
After two consecutive 9th-place finishes in the Second Division, Brentford manager Jackie Gibbons elected to keep his squad together for the 1951–52 season, with former Brighton & Hove Albion utility player Frank Morrad being his only first team signing.

Aided by the goalscoring of full back-cum-centre forward Fred Monk, Brentford showed excellent form in the first half of the season and just five losses in the opening 21 matches put the club into the promotion places. The push for promotion was derailed during the Christmas period, after consecutive defeats to Southampton on Christmas Day and Boxing Day. A dressing room ruckus ensued between manager Gibbons on one side and half backs Ron Greenwood and Jimmy Hill on the other. The bust-up resulted in Greenwood and Hill requesting transfers, with Hill eventually moving to local rivals Fulham in March 1952 in exchange for inside forward Jimmy Bowie.

Centre forward Billy Dare came into goalscoring in the second half of the season, but the disruption to the Harper-Hill-Greenwood half back line (Greenwood later rescinded his transfer request) led to an increase in the number of goals conceded and Brentford drifted out of contention for promotion to finish in 10th place. Amid much fanfare, former England international Tommy Lawton was signed for a club record £16,000 fee in March 1952, but he managed to contribute only two goals in his 10 appearances. In 2010, full back Ken Horne commented that "I'm sure we could have gone up that year but the spirit completely went out the team. We'd got by on spirit. The team had been kept together for so long that they had been fighting for each other".

The end of the season saw the retirement of Brentford's final two players signed prior to the outbreak of the Second World War in September 1939 – goalkeeper Ted Gaskell and utility man Tom Manley. Both received a joint-testimonial in April 1954.

== League table ==
Pos	Team	Pld	W	D	L	GF	GA	GAv	Pts
8	Luton Town	42	16	12	14	77	78	0.987	44
9	Rotherham United	42	17	8	17	73	71	1.028	42
10	Brentford	42	15	12	15	54	55	0.982	42
11	Sheffield United	42	18	5	19	90	76	1.184	41
12	West Ham United	42	15	11	16	67	77	0.870	41

Rules for classification: 1) Points; 2) Goal average; 3) Goals scored

== Results ==
Brentford's goal tally listed first.

=== Legend ===
Win	Draw	Loss

=== Football League Second Division ===
No.	Date	Opponent	Venue	Result	Attendance	Scorer(s)	Notes
1	18 August 1951	Leeds United	A	1–1	20,268	Paton	
2	22 August 1951	Everton	A	0–1	32,722		
3	25 August 1951	Rotherham United	H	2–0	24,904	Sperrin, Monk	
4	27 August 1951	Everton	H	1–0	19,525	Sperrin	
5	1 September 1951	Cardiff City	A	0–2	27,772		
6	5 September 1951	Doncaster Rovers	A	2–1	21,154	Goodwin, Monk (pen)	
7	8 September 1951	Birmingham City	H	1–0	25,029	Monk	
8	15 September 1951	Leicester City	A	1–1	23,757	Monk	
9	22 September 1951	Nottingham Forest	H	1–1	26,350	Hill	
10	29 September 1951	Queens Park Rangers	A	1–3	25,339	Monk	
11	6 October 1951	Notts County	H	1–0	28,214	Coote	
12	13 October 1951	Luton Town	A	2–0	18,521	Sperrin, Monk	
13	20 October 1951	Bury	H	4–0	20,726	Sperrin (2), Coote, Paton	
14	27 October 1951	Swansea Town	A	1–1	19,235	Sperrin	
15	3 November 1951	Coventry City	H	4–0	22,899	Monk	
16	10 November 1951	West Ham United	A	0–1	26,288		
17	17 November 1951	Sheffield United	H	4–1	26,288	Paton, Monk (2), Sperrin	
18	24 November 1951	Barnsley	A	0–0	10,149		
19	1 December 1951	Hull City	H	2–1	26,072	Monk (2)	
20	8 December 1951	Blackburn Rovers	A	0–3	13,617		
21	15 December 1951	Leeds United	H	2–1	17,957	Dare (2)	
22	22 December 1951	Rotherham United	A	1–1	14,809	Monk	
23	25 December 1951	Southampton	H	1–2	25,841	Dare	
24	26 December 1951	Southampton	A	1–2	21,625	Sperrin	
25	29 December 1951	Cardiff City	H	1–1	27,547	Paton	
26	5 January 1952	Birmingham City	A	2–1	28,368	Dare, Badham (og)	
27	19 January 1952	Leicester City	H	1–3	19,923	Dare	
28	26 January 1952	Nottingham Forest	A	0–2	21,649		
29	9 February 1952	Queens Park Rangers	H	0–0	25,645		
30	16 February 1952	Notts County	A	2–5	22,503	Dare, Sperrin	
31	1 March 1952	Luton Town	H	3–3	21,218	Dare (2), Horne	
32	8 March 1952	Bury	A	0–1	12,140		
33	15 March 1952	Swansea Town	H	3–1	29,753	Coote, Dare (2)	
34	22 March 1952	Coventry City	A	1–2	27,577	Dare	
35	5 April 1952	Sheffield United	A	4–1	23,435	Lawton, Paton, Dare, Harper	
36	11 April 1952	Sheffield Wednesday	H	2–3	35,827	Bragg, Dare	
37	12 April 1952	Barnsley	H	1–1	19,912	Goodwin	
38	14 April 1952	Sheffield Wednesday	A	0–2	43,935		
39	19 April 1952	Hull City	A	1–4	30,891	Dare	
40	21 April 1952	West Ham United	H	1–1	12,563	Lawton	(Note: The original fixture on 29 March 1952 was abandoned at half time due to snow, with the score at 1–1.)
41	26 April 1952	Blackburn Rovers	H	1–1	16,195	Slater	
42	30 April 1952	Doncaster Rovers	H	1–0	10,243	Morrad	

=== FA Cup ===
Round	Date	Opponent	Venue	Result	Attendance	Scorer(s)	Notes
3R	12 January 1952	Queens Park Rangers	H	3–1	35,000	Coote, Paton, Sperrin	
4R	2 February 1952	Luton Town	A	2–2	25,320	Sperrin (2)	
4R (replay)	6 February 1952	Luton Town	H	0–0 (a.e.t.)	29,500		
4R (2nd replay)	18 February 1952	Luton Town	N	2–3 (a.e.t.)	37,269	Dare (2)	(Note: Match played at Arsenal Stadium, London.)

- Sources: 100 Years Of Brentford, Statto, 11v11

== Playing squad ==
Players' ages are as of the opening day of the 1951–52 season.

Pos.	Name	Nat.	Date of birth (age)	Signed from	Signed in	Notes
Goalkeepers						
GK	Ted Gaskell	(England)	19 December 1916 (aged 34)	Buxton	1937	
GK	Alf Jefferies	(England)	9 February 1922 (aged 29)	Oxford City	1945	
GK	Reg Newton	(England)	30 June 1926 (aged 25)	Leyton Orient	1949	
Defenders						
DF	Wally Bragg	(England)	8 July 1929 (aged 22)	Twickenham Celtic	1946	
DF	Ian Dargie	(England)	3 October 1931 (aged 19)	Tonbridge	1952	
DF	Ken Horne	(England)	25 June 1926 (aged 25)	Blackpool	1950	
DF	Tecwyn Jones	(Wales)	3 January 1930 (aged 21)	Holywell Town	1950	
DF	Frank Morrad	(England)	28 February 1920 (aged 31)	Brighton & Hove Albion	1951	
DF	Roddy Munro	(Scotland)	27 July 1920 (aged 31)	Rangers	1946	
Midfielders						
HB	George Bristow	(England)	25 June 1933 (aged 18)	Youth	1950	
HB	Ron Greenwood (c)	(England)	11 November 1921 (aged 29)	Bradford Park Avenue	1949	
HB	Tony Harper	(England)	26 May 1925 (aged 26)	Headington United	1948	
HB	Frank Latimer	(England)	3 October 1923 (aged 27)	Snowdown Colliery Welfare	1945	
HB	Bill Slater	(England)	29 April 1927 (aged 24)	Blackpool	1951	Amateur
Forwards						
FW	Jimmy Bowie	(Scotland)	9 August 1924 (aged 27)	Fulham	1952	
FW	Ken Coote	(England)	19 May 1928 (aged 23)	Wembley	1949	
FW	Billy Dare	(England)	14 February 1927 (aged 24)	Hendon	1948	
FW	Verdi Godwin	(England)	11 February 1926 (aged 25)	Grimsby Town	1952	
FW	Jackie Goodwin	(England)	29 September 1920 (aged 30)	Birmingham City	1949	
FW	Tommy Lawton	(England)	6 October 1919 (aged 31)	Notts County	1952	
FW	Terry Ledgerton	(England)	7 October 1930 (aged 20)	Huyton	1950	
FW	Fred Monk	(England)	9 October 1920 (aged 30)	Guildford City	1948	
FW	Johnny Paton	(Scotland)	2 April 1923 (aged 28)	Celtic	1949	
FW	Billy Sperrin	(England)	9 April 1922 (aged 29)	Guildford City	1949	
Players who left the club mid-season
HB	Jimmy Hill	(England)	22 July 1928 (aged 23)	Reading	1949	Transferred to Fulham

- Sources: 100 Years Of Brentford, Timeless Bees

== Coaching staff ==
Name	Role
(England) Jackie Gibbons	Secretary-Manager
(Scotland) Jimmy Bain	Assistant Manager
(England) David Richards	Trainer
(England) Jack Cartmell	Assistant Trainer
(England) Jimmy Hogan	Assistant Trainer

== Statistics ==
=== Appearances and goals ===

Brentford's highest appearance-makers in each position during the Football League season.

Pos	Nat	Name	League		FA Cup		Total	
Pos	Nat	Name	Apps	Goals	Apps	Goals	Apps	Goals
GK	(England)	Ted Gaskell	15	0	4	0	19	0
GK	(England)	Alf Jefferies	17	0	0	0	17	0
GK	(England)	Reg Newton	10	0	0	0	10	0
DF	(England)	Wally Bragg	10	1	0	0	10	1
DF	(England)	Ian Dargie	1	0	—		1	0
DF	(England)	Ken Horne	34	1	4	0	38	1
DF	(Wales)	Tecwyn Jones	1	0	0	0	1	0
DF	(England)	Frank Morrad	1	1	0	0	1	1
DF	(Scotland)	Roddy Munro	40	0	4	0	44	0
HB	(England)	George Bristow	2	0	0	0	2	0
HB	(England)	Ron Greenwood	37	0	3	0	40	0
HB	(England)	Tony Harper	37	1	4	0	41	1
HB	(England)	Jimmy Hill	27	1	3	0	30	1
HB	(England)	Frank Latimer	4	0	1	0	5	0
HB	(England)	Bill Slater	7	1	1	0	8	1
FW	(Scotland)	Jimmy Bowie	9	0	—		9	0
FW	(England)	Ken Coote	24	3	4	1	28	4
FW	(England)	Billy Dare	42	14	4	2	46	16
FW	(England)	Verdi Godwin	1	0	—		1	0
FW	(England)	Jackie Goodwin	21	2	2	0	23	2
FW	(England)	Tommy Lawton	10	2	—		10	2
FW	(England)	Terry Ledgerton	5	0	1	0	6	0
FW	(England)	Fred Monk	40	12	2	0	42	12
FW	(Scotland)	Johnny Paton	36	5	3	1	39	6
FW	(England)	Billy Sperrin	31	9	4	2	35	11

- Players listed in italics left the club mid-season.
- Source: 100 Years Of Brentford

=== Goalscorers ===
Pos.	Nat	Player	FL2	FAC	Total
FW	(England)	Billy Dare	14	2	16
FW	(England)	Fred Monk	12	0	12
FW	(England)	Billy Sperrin	9	2	11
FW	(Scotland)	Johnny Paton	5	1	6
FW	(England)	Ken Coote	3	1	4
FW	(England)	Tommy Lawton	2	—	2
FW	(England)	Jackie Goodwin	2	0	2
DF	(England)	Wally Bragg	1	0	1
HB	(England)	Tony Harper	1	0	1
HB	(England)	Jimmy Hill	1	0	1
DF	(England)	Ken Horne	1	0	1
DF	(England)	Frank Morrad	1	0	1
HB	(England)	Bill Slater	1	0	1
Opponents			1	0	1
Total			54	7	61

- Players listed in italics left the club mid-season.
- Source: 100 Years Of Brentford

=== Amateur international caps ===
Pos.	Nat	Player	Caps	Goals	Ref
HB	(England)	Bill Slater	5	0	

=== Management ===
Name	Nat	From	To	Record All Comps					Record League				
Name	Nat	From	To	P	W	D	L	W %	P	W	D	L	W %
Jackie Gibbons	(England)	18 August 1951	30 April 1952	46	16	14	16	34.78	42	15	12	15	35.71

=== Summary ===
Games played	46 (42 Second Division, 4 FA Cup)
Games won	16 (15 Second Division, 1 FA Cup)
Games drawn	14 (12 Second Division, 2 FA Cup)
Games lost	16 (15 Second Division, 1 FA Cup)
Goals scored	61 (54 Second Division, 7 FA Cup)
Goals conceded	61 (55 Second Division, 6 FA Cup)
Clean sheets	11 (10 Second Division, 1 FA Cup)
Biggest league win	4–0 on two occasions
Worst league defeat	3–0 versus Blackburn Rovers, 8 December 1951; 4–1 versus Hull City, 19 April 1952; 5–2 versus Notts County, 16 February 1952
Most appearances	46, Billy Dare (42 Second Division, 4 FA Cup)
Top scorer (league)	14, Billy Dare
Top scorer (all competitions)	16, Billy Dare

== Transfers & loans ==
Players transferred in
Date	Pos.	Name	Previous club	Fee	Ref.
May 1951	DF	(England) George Lowden	Unattached	Amateur	
August 1951	DF	(England) Frank Morrad	(England) Brighton & Hove Albion	n/a	
September 1951	HB	(Scotland) Mike Skivington	(England) Gillingham	n/a	
December 1951	GK	(Wales) Dave Jones	(England) Dover	n/a	
December 1951	HB	(England) Bill Slater	(England) Blackpool	Amateur	
25 February 1952	DF	(England) Ian Dargie	(England) Tonbridge	n/a	
March 1952	FW	(Scotland) Jimmy Bowie	(England) Fulham	Exchange	
March 1952	FW	(England) Verdi Godwin	(England) Grimsby Town	n/a	
March 1952	FW	(England) Tommy Lawton	(England) Notts County	£16,000	
Players transferred out
Date	Pos.	Name	Subsequent club	Fee	Ref.
December 1951	n/a	(Scotland) Jack Nicholson	(Scotland) Dundee United	n/a	
March 1952	HB	(England) Jimmy Hill	(England) Fulham	Exchange	
Players released
Date	Pos.	Name	Subsequent club	Join date	Ref.
October 1951	FW	(England) Joe Corr	(England) Snowdown Colliery Welfare	October 1951	
May 1952	GK	(England) Ted Gaskell	Retired		
May 1952	FW	(England) Bernard Kelly	(England) Deal Town	1952	
May 1952	HB	(England) Tom Manley	Retired		
May 1952	FW	(England) Tommy Mycock	(England) Tranmere Rovers	May 1952	
May 1952	HB	(Scotland) Mike Skivington	Retired		
