= Tony Harper (footballer) =

English footballer

Personal information
- Full name: Anthony Frederick Harper
- Date of birth: 26 May 1925
- Place of birth: Oxford, England
- Date of death: 28 June 1982 (aged 57)
- Place of death: Bullingdon, England
- Positions: Wing half; inside forward

Senior career*
Years	Team	Apps	(Gls)
- Headington United
1948–1955	Brentford	173	(6)
1955–1959	Headington United	116	(6)
- * Club domestic league appearances and goals

Anthony Frederick Harper (26 May 1925 – 28 June 1982) was an English football wing half or inside forward who made 173 appearances in the Football League for Brentford.

== Club career ==
=== Headington United ===
Harper began his career at Spartan League hometown club Headington United and departed the club in March 1948.

=== Brentford ===
Harper signed for Second Division club Brentford in March 1948. He began his time with the Bees as an inside forward and made his debut in a 2–1 defeat to Leicester City at Griffin Park on 15 September 1948. Harper missed the entire 1949–50 season due to illness, but broke into the team in the 1950–51 season as a wing half and formed a celebrated half back line with Ron Greenwood and Jimmy Hill. He made a career-high 41 appearances during the 1951–52 season and held his place until Ken Coote began to establish himself in the wing half position. Harper played on until the 1954–55 season and dropped into the reserves in the latter stages of the campaign. He departed Brentford in the summer of 1955 and made 188 appearances and scored seven goals in his seven years with the club.

=== Return to Headington United ===
Harper returned to Headington United, then members of the Southern League, during the 1955 off-season. He made over 137 further appearances before retiring in 1959.

== Personal life ==
After experiencing trouble commuting from his Oxford home to Brentford, Harper stayed in a club house in Hounslow with teammate Ted Gaskell and Gaskell's wife, before eventually moving into the house next door.

== Career statistics ==
Appearances and goals by club, season and competition
Club	Season	League			FA Cup		Other		Total	
Club	Season	Division	Apps	Goals	Apps	Goals	Apps	Goals	Apps	Goals
Brentford	1948–49	Second Division	19	0	2	1	—		21	1
Brentford	1950–51	Second Division	29	1	1	0	—		30	1
Brentford	1951–52	Second Division	37	1	4	0	—		41	1
Brentford	1952–53	Second Division	36	3	3	0	—		39	3
Brentford	1953–54	Second Division	26	1	0	0	—		26	1
Brentford	1954–55	Third Division South	26	0	5	0	—		31	0
Brentford	Total		173	6	15	1	—		188	7
Headington United	1955–56	Southern League	20	0	0	0	1 (Note: Appearances in Southern League Cup)	0	21	0
Headington United	1956–57	Southern League	35	3	1	0	2	0	38	3
Headington United	1957–58	Southern League	40	2	5	0	3	0	48	2
Headington United	1958–59	Southern League North West Division	15	1	4	0	4 (Note: 3 appearances in Southern League Cup, 1 appearance in Southern League Inter-Zone)	0	23	1
Headington United	1959–60	Southern League	6	0	0	0	1	0	7	0
Headington United	Total		116	6	10	0	11	0	137	6
Career total			289	12	25	1	11	0	325	13
