= Johnny Paton =

Scottish footballer, snooker referee

Personal information
- Full name: John Aloysius Paton
- Date of birth: 2 April 1923
- Place of birth: Glasgow, Scotland
- Date of death: 2 October 2015 (aged 92)
- Place of death: Stanmore, England
- Position: Outside left

Youth career
- St. Mungo's Academy
- St. Mary's Calton
- Dennistoun Waverley

Senior career*
Years	Team	Apps	(Gls)
1942–1949	Celtic	52	(12)
- → New York Americans (guest)
1945	→ Leeds United (guest)	4	(0)
1946–1947	→ Chelsea (loan)	18	(3)
1949–1952	Brentford	90	(14)
1952–1955	Watford	84	(17)

International career
- Scotland Schoolboys
1940	Scotland Juniors	1	(0)

Managerial career
- 1955–1956: Watford
- 1961–1965: Arsenal 'A'
- * Club domestic league appearances and goals

John Aloysius Paton (2 April 1923 – 2 October 2015) was a Scottish professional football player, manager, coach, scout and later a professional snooker referee. He began his career in Scotland with Celtic and played in the Football League for Chelsea, Brentford and Watford. Paton later managed Watford and Arsenal 'A'.

== Club career ==
=== Celtic ===
Born in Glasgow, Paton joined Celtic (the club he supported as a boy) during the Second World War in May 1942. An outside left, he made his debut in a 2–0 Southern League win over St Mirren on 16 January 1943.

During the war, Paton spent a period as a guest at American Soccer League club New York Americans while stationed in the United States and later guested for Leeds United in 1945 in England, making four appearances. He also guested for Arsenal, Crystal Palace, Millwall and Manchester City during the conflict. Paton scored for Celtic in the Victory in Europe Cup triumph over Queens Park on 9 May 1945.

Due to the suspension of competitive football for the duration of the Second World War, Paton didn't make his first professional appearances for Celtic until the 1947–48 season. He made his first professional appearances on loan at English First Division club Chelsea during the 1946–47 season. Prior to a dispute with the Celtic management over wages that led to his departure from the club in September 1949, Paton made 77 appearances and scored 16 goals. His last competitive game was the 3–1 1949 Glasgow Cup Final victory over Third Lanark. During the three post-war seasons with Celtic, Paton made 77 appearances and scored 16 goals.

=== Brentford ===
Paton signed for Second Division club Brentford in September 1949 for a £5,000 fee. He had contacted London Evening Star columnist (and ex-Arsenal defender) Bernard Joy and asked for an advert to be placed in the paper that he was available for transfer. Brentford manager (and former Celtic player) Malcolm McDonald was the first to take up the option on Paton's services. He had a dream start to his career at Griffin Park, scoring on his debut in a 2–0 win over Bradford Park Avenue and scoring again against Blackburn Rovers in the following game.

A knock suffered in a match versus Southampton on 29 October 1949 hampered his progress, with Paton ruing that he had a "gammy leg" for two years, from which he finally recovered after a successful operation at Brentford hospital. He played on at Griffin Park until the end of the 1951–52 season, by which time he had made 94 appearances and scored 16 goals.

=== Watford ===
Paton and Brentford teammate Jimmy Bowie joined Third Division South club Watford in July 1952, to help finance the transfer which had seen Tommy Lawton move to the Bees the previous year. He made 91 appearances and scored 17 goals before playing his final match in 1955.

== International and representative career ==
Paton made appearances for Scotland at international level as a schoolboy and a junior. He played for the RAF representative team during the Second World War and appeared alongside Stanley Matthews in the team.

== Coaching and scouting career ==
Paton lamented the standard of football coaching in England in the early 1950s and said "many managers deliberately starved their players of the ball during the week, believing it made them more hungry for it out on the pitch on a Saturday". Paton and Brentford teammates Ron Greenwood and Jimmy Hill enrolled on the first ever FA coaching course at Lilleshall in the early 1950s. One of the instructors was Brentford goalkeeper Ted Gaskell and Paton roomed with Greenwood, Hill and Malcolm Allison. Paton also led the Hertfordshire FA's youth coaching scheme during the 1954–55 season.

In the early 1960s, Paton worked as a scout for Rotherham United, focusing on Glasgow and Scotland. In 1961, Tommy Docherty offered Paton a scouting role and the position of 'A' team manager at First Division club Arsenal. Paton later found out that Ron Greenwood recommended him for the role. He won the 1961–62 Metropolitan League Cup and the 1962–63 Metropolitan League title with the 'A' team. He left the club in 1965.

== Managerial career ==
After serving Watford as its first-ever player-coach, Paton succeeded Len Goulden as manager in October 1955. He had a good start to his reign, but after entering hospital for a cartilage operation on both knees, the team's form drained away in his absence. Paton was relieved of his duties only four months into his reign, after just two wins from 15 Third Division South matches.

== Personal life ==
Paton was born into a family of Celtic supporters, with his grandfather holding a season ticket at Celtic Park and his father spending time on the club's books as a player. In addition to football, Paton also competed as an amateur welterweight boxer and in athletics as a youth. During the Second World War, he served as a navigator in the RAF. In the late 1950s, Paton turned his back on football and worked as a press photographer, snooker referee and as a sales rep, selling chocolate biscuits. Paton died in October 2015, aged 92.

== Career statistics ==
=== Player ===
Appearances and goals by club, season and competition
Club	Season	League			National cup (Note: Includes Scottish Cup, FA Cup)		League cup (Note: Includes Scottish League Cup)		Other		Total	
Club	Season	Division	Apps	Goals	Apps	Goals	Apps	Goals	Apps	Goals	Apps	Goals
Celtic	1946–47	Scottish First Division	0	0	0	0	4	0	0	0	4	0
Celtic	1947–48	Scottish First Division	28	6	4	2	5	2	2 (Note: Appearances in Glasgow Cup)	0	39	10
Celtic	1948–49	Scottish First Division	24	6	1	0	6	0	3	0	34	6
Celtic	Total		52	12	5	2	15	2	5	0	77	16
Chelsea (loan)	1946–47	First Division	18	3	5	0	—		—		23	3
Brentford	1949–50	Second Division	23	5	0	0	—		—		23	5
Brentford	1950–51	Second Division	31	4	1	1	—		—		32	5
Brentford	1951–52	Second Division	36	5	3	1	—		—		39	6
Brentford	Total		90	14	4	2	—		—		94	16
Watford	1952–53	Third Division South	33	2	3	0	—		—		36	2
Watford	1953–54	Third Division South	37	11	1	0	—		—		38	11
Watford	1954–55	Third Division South	14	4	3	0	—		—		17	4
Watford	Total		84	17	7	0	—		—		91	17
Career total			244	46	21	4	15	2	5	0	285	52

=== Manager ===
Managerial record by team and tenure
Team	From	To	Record					Ref
Team	From	To	P	W	D	L	Win %	Ref
Watford	October 1955	February 1956	17	3	6	8	17.6	
Total			17	3	6	8	17.6	—

== Honours ==
=== As a player ===
Celtic

- Victory in Europe Cup: 1945
- Glasgow Cup: 1948–49

=== As a manager ===
Arsenal 'A'

- Metropolitan League: 1962–63
- Metropolitan League Cup: 1961–62

== Sources ==
- Jones, Trefor (1996). The Watford Football Club Illustrated Who's Who. T.G. Jones. ISBN 0-9527458-0-1.
