= Sperrin =

Sperrin is a given name and surname. Notable people with the name include:

- Billy Sperrin (1922–2000), English footballer and coach
- Martyn Sperrin (born 1956), English footballer, son of Billy
- Sperrin N.F. Chant (1897–1987), Canadian psychologist.

== See also ==
- Sperring
- Sperrins
