= Jack Jordan =

Jack Jordan is the name of:

- Jack Jordan (footballer) (1924–2007), Scottish footballer
- Jack Jordan (politician), American politician
