= Ken Horne =

English footballer (1926–2015)

Personal information
- Full name: Kenneth William Horne
- Date of birth: 25 June 1926
- Place of birth: Burton-upon-Trent, England
- Date of death: September 2015 (aged 89)
- Place of death: Richmond, England
- Positions: Right half; full back

Youth career
- Stapenhill

Senior career*
Years	Team	Apps	(Gls)
	Wolverhampton Wanderers	0	(0)
1947–1950	Blackpool	0	(0)
1950–1961	Brentford	223	(1)
1961–1964	Dover		
- * Club domestic league appearances and goals

Kenneth William Horne (25 June 1926 – 3 September 2015) was an English professional footballer and coach, best remembered for his 11 years in the Football League with Brentford, for whom he made over 220 appearances. He was inducted into the club's Hall of Fame in 2015.

== Playing career ==
=== Early years ===
A right half, Horne began his career as an amateur with First Division club Wolverhampton Wanderers, failing to make a first team appearance and moving to fellow top-flight club Blackpool in 1947. Despite being described as "a player of great promise", an abundance of right halves at the club saw Horne right down the pecking order and he failed to make a first team appearance for the Tangerines. He departed the club in 1950.

=== Brentford ===
Horne signed for Second Division club Brentford in 1950 and made his debut in a 0–0 draw with Leicester City at Griffin Park on 18 November 1950. He made 20 appearances during the second half of the 1950–51 season and was converted into a full back. He established himself in the team during the 1951–52 season and made 38 appearances. Horne scored his only league goal for the club in a 3–3 draw with Luton Town on 1 March 1952, after being named in the team as a centre forward.

Horne made just 10 appearances in each of the 1952–53 and 1953–54 seasons, before the Bees' relegation to the Third Division South saw him regain a regular place in the team and he made 41 appearances during the 1954–55 season. Horne and teammates Billy Sperrin, George Bristow and Reg Newton were rewarded for their loyalty to the Bees with a testimonial against an International Managers XI in 1956.

Horne switched to the left back position during the 1958–59 season and made a career-high 48 appearances. Horne moved to across to right back during the 1959–60 season (making way for Ken Coote) and made 22 appearances in what was to be his penultimate season at Griffin Park. Horne failed to appear at all during the 1960–61 season and departed the club at the end of the campaign, having made 239 appearances and scored one goal during his 11 years with Brentford.

=== Dover ===
Horne joined Southern League First Division club Dover in 1961 and ended his career with a three-year spell.

== Coaching career ==
Horne held youth coaching positions at Queens Park Rangers and Brentford and also undertook scouting work for the latter club.

== Personal life ==
Horne was married to Joyce and during his early years with Brentford, he worked in the town's market. He was diagnosed with pancreatic cancer at age 65 and underwent surgery which prolonged his life. He died in September 2015, aged 89.

== Career statistics ==
Appearances and goals by club, season and competition
Club	Season	League			FA Cup		Total	
Club	Season	Division	Apps	Goals	Apps	Goals	Apps	Goals
Brentford	1950–51	Second Division	20	0	0	0	20	0
Brentford	1951–52	Second Division	34	1	4	0	38	1
Brentford	1952–53	Second Division	10	0	0	0	10	0
Brentford	1953–54	Second Division	10	0	0	0	10	0
Brentford	1954–55	Third Division South	35	0	6	0	41	0
Brentford	1955–56	Third Division South	7	0	0	0	7	0
Brentford	1956–57	Third Division South	5	0	0	0	5	0
Brentford	1957–58	Third Division South	37	0	1	0	38	0
Brentford	1958–59	Third Division	45	0	3	0	48	0
Brentford	1959–60	Third Division	20	0	2	0	22	0
Career total			223	1	16	0	239	1

== Honours ==
- Brentford Hall of Fame
