= Frank Latimer =

English footballer

Personal information
- Full name: Frank Jackson Latimer
- Date of birth: 3 October 1923
- Place of birth: Sunderland, England
- Date of death: November 1994 (aged 71)
- Place of death: Durham, England
- Position: Utility player

Youth career
- –1945: Snowdown Colliery Welfare

Senior career*
| Years | Team | Apps | (Gls) |
| 1945–1956 | Brentford | 171 | (3) |
- Gravesend & Northfleet
- Snowdown Colliery Welfare
- * Club domestic league appearances and goals

Frank Jackson Latimer (3 October 1923 – November 1994) was an English professional footballer who made over 170 appearances as a utility player in the Football League for Brentford.

== Club career ==
=== Brentford ===
A defender, Latimer was signed by Brentford in November 1945 from non-League club Snowdown Colliery Welfare. He played in the reserve team during the 1945–46 and 1946–47 seasons and made his professional debut at the end of the latter campaign, in a 1–0 defeat to Arsenal at Griffin Park on 26 May 1947, which condemned the Bees to relegation from the First Division. Latimer began the 1947–48 Second Division season as a first choice at the back, but was dropped in December 1947 and failed to appear again until September 1949, when he regained his place in the team. Latimer found himself dropped again in January 1951 and failed to appear for over a year, before managing five appearances in the second half of the 1951–52 season.

Latimer made 33 appearances during the 1952–53 season and was pressed into service as an inside left during the latter part of the campaign. He scored his only goals for the club within the space of a week in March 1953, with two in a 3–2 win over Leicester City and a consolation in a 4–1 defeat to West Ham United. Latimer made a career-high 39 appearances during the 1953–54 season, playing left back in a disastrous campaign which ended with relegation to the Third Division South. Latimer played on until the end of the 1955–56 season and played the final 10 games of the season as a centre half, with his final appearance for the club coming in a 2–2 draw with Walsall on 31 March 1956. He made 186 appearances and scored three goals during his decade as a first team player with the Bees.

=== Non-League football ===
In 1956, Latimer dropped into non-League football and joined Southern League club Gravesend & Northfleet. He later returned to Kent League First Division club Snowdown Colliery Welfare.

== Personal life ==
Latimer worked as a miner before becoming a professional footballer and came to the attention of Brentford manager Harry Curtis when he moved from the Durham coalfield to the Snowdown Colliery in Kent. Latimer returned to his trade after his retirement from football.

== Career statistics ==
Appearances and goals by club, season and competition
| Club | Season | League | | | FA Cup | | Total | |
| Club | Season | Division | Apps | Goals | Apps | Goals | Apps | Goals |
|---|---|---|---|---|---|---|---|---|
| Brentford | 1946–47 | First Division | 1 | 0 | 0 | 0 | 1 | 0 |
| Brentford | 1947–48 | Second Division | 16 | 0 | 0 | 0 | 16 | 0 |
| Brentford | 1949–50 | Second Division | 22 | 0 | 1 | 0 | 23 | 0 |
| Brentford | 1950–51 | Second Division | 24 | 0 | 1 | 0 | 25 | 0 |
| Brentford | 1951–52 | Second Division | 4 | 0 | 1 | 0 | 5 | 0 |
| Brentford | 1952–53 | Second Division | 30 | 3 | 3 | 0 | 33 | 3 |
| Brentford | 1953–54 | Second Division | 36 | 0 | 3 | 0 | 39 | 0 |
| Brentford | 1954–55 | Third Division South | 28 | 0 | 5 | 0 | 33 | 0 |
| Brentford | 1955–56 | Third Division South | 10 | 0 | 1 | 0 | 11 | 0 |
| Career total | | | 171 | 3 | 15 | 0 | 186 | 3 |
