= Reg Newton =

English footballer

Personal information
- Full name: Reginald William Newton
- Date of birth: 26 June 1926
- Place of birth: Limehouse, England
- Date of death: 21 November 1976 (aged 50)
- Place of death: Beaconsfield, England
- Position: Goalkeeper

Senior career*
Years	Team	Apps	(Gls)
- Dagenham Works
1948–1949	Leyton Orient	23	(0)
1949–1957	Brentford	87	(0)
1957	Tunbridge Wells United		
1957–1958	Brentford	0	(0)
1958–1959	Yiewsley		
1959–1960	Chelmsford City	29	(0)
- * Club domestic league appearances and goals

Reginald William Newton (26 June 1926 – 21 November 1976) was an English professional footballer who played as a goalkeeper in the Football League for Brentford and Leyton Orient.

== Playing career ==
=== Leyton Orient ===
A goalkeeper, Newton began his career with the Dagenham Works team and earned a move to the Football League with Leyton Orient in April 1948. He made 23 league appearances for the struggling Third Division South club during the 1948–49 season and departed Brisbane Road at the end of the campaign.

=== Brentford ===
Newton moved across London to sign for Second Division club Brentford in July 1949, in a part-exchange for Alan Smith. Newton was a second-choice goalkeeper behind Alf Jefferies, Ted Gaskell and Gerry Cakebread for much of his time at Griffin Park, but was first-choice during the 1953–54 season and made 42 appearances in a campaign which saw the Bees relegated to the Third Division South. Newton left the club in February 1957, having made 87 appearances in just under eight years with Brentford. Nonetheless, his service to the club was recognised when he was awarded the share of the benefits from a testimonial match shared with George Bristow, Ken Horne and Billy Sperrin in 1956.

=== Later career ===
Newton dropped into non-League football to sign for Kent League First Division club Tunbridge Wells United in February 1957. New Brentford manager Malky McDonald re-signed Newton in July 1957, as backup for Gerry Cakebread and Sonny Feehan. He failed to make an appearance during the 1957–58 season and was given a free transfer in May 1958. Newton ended his career with spells at Southern League clubs Yiewsley and Chelmsford City.

== Personal life ==
Upon the outbreak of the Second World War, Newton joined the Army and was trained at Aldershot to be a PT instructor. While at Aldershot he was friends with Frank Swift, Denis Compton, Bill Shankly and Matt Busby. During and after his later years as a player at Brentford, Newton worked as a decorator. He died in November 1976, at the age of 50.

== Career statistics ==
Appearances and goals by club, season and competition
Club	Season	League			FA Cup		Total	
Club	Season	Division	Apps	Goals	Apps	Goals	Apps	Goals
Brentford	1949–50	Second Division	2	0	0	0	2	0
Brentford	1950–51	Second Division	5	0	0	0	5	0
Brentford	1951–52	Second Division	10	0	0	0	10	0
Brentford	1952–53	Second Division	7	0	0	0	7	0
Brentford	1953–54	Second Division	39	0	3	0	42	0
Brentford	1954–55	Third Division South	18	0	0	0	18	0
Brentford	1955–56	Third Division South	1	0	0	0	1	0
Brentford	1956–57	Third Division South	5	0	0	0	5	0
Career total			87	0	3	0	90	0
