= Dennis Rampling =

English footballer

Personal information
- Full name: Dennis William Rampling
- Date of birth: 25 November 1923
- Place of birth: Gainsborough, England
- Date of death: 14 September 2015 (aged 91)
- Place of death: Surrey, England
- Position: Outside right

Youth career
- –1942: Napier & Sons

Senior career*
Years	Team	Apps	(Gls)
1942–1948	Fulham	2	(0)
1946–1947	→ Worcester City (loan)	3	
1948–1949	Bournemouth & Boscombe Athletic	24	(4)
1949–1950	Brentford	1	(0)
1950–1951	Weymouth	5	(0)
1951–1952	Ashford Town (Kent)	30	(3)
- * Club domestic league appearances and goals

Dennis William Rampling (25 November 1923 – 14 September 2015) was an English professional footballer who played as an outside right in the Football League for Fulham, Bournemouth & Boscombe Athletic and Brentford.

== Playing career ==
An outside right, Rampling began his career with Fulham during the Second World War and signed in November 1942. After the war, he made just four competitive appearances, scoring one goal, before transferring to Third Division South high-flyers Bournemouth & Boscombe Athletic in July 1948. Rampling made 24 league appearances and scored four goals during his single season at Dean Court and joined Second Division club Brentford in May 1949. He made his debut on the opening day of the 1949–50 season against Tottenham Hotspur, but failed to make another appearance for the club before departing in April 1950. After his release from Brentford, Rampling dropped into non-League football and had spells with Weymouth and Ashford Town.

== Personal life ==
Rampling was called into the RAF in March 1946 and served as a PT instructor.

== Career statistics ==
Appearances and goals by club, season and competition
Club	Season	League			FA Cup		Other		Total	
Club	Season	Division	Apps	Goals	Apps	Goals	Apps	Goals	Apps	Goals
Brentford	1949–50	Second Division	1	0	0	0	―		1	0
Ashford Town	1951–52	Kent League	28	2	6	0	6 (Note: 5 appearances in Kent League, 1 appearance in Kent Senior Cup)	0	40	2
Ashford Town	1952–53	Kent League	8	1	2	0	0	0	10	1
Ashford Town	Total		30	3	8	0	6	0	50	3
Career total			31	0	8	0	6	0	51	3
