= Sperring =

Sperring is a surname. Notable people with the surname include:

- Alistair Sperring (born 1963), English footballer
- Rob Sperring (born 1949), American baseball player

== See also ==
- Sperrin
