= Verdi Godwin =

English footballer

Personal information
- Full name: Verdi Godwin
- Date of birth: 11 February 1926
- Place of birth: Blackburn, England
- Date of death: 1 December 2013 (aged 87)
- Place of death: Southport, England
- Position: Forward

Youth career
- Middlesbrough

Senior career*
| Years | Team | Apps | (Gls) |
| 1946–1948 | Blackburn Rovers | 27 | (6) |
| 1948–1949 | Manchester City | 8 | (3) |
| 1949–1950 | Stoke City | 22 | (2) |
| 1950–1951 | Mansfield Town | 31 | (9) |
| 1951–1952 | Middlesbrough | 0 | (0) |
| 1952 | Grimsby Town | 1 | (0) |
| 1953 | Brentford | 7 | (1) |
| 1954–1955 | Southport | 17 | (2) |
| 1955–1956 | Barrow | 15 | (3) |
| 1956–1957 | Tranmere Rovers | 14 | (2) |
| 1958–1959 | Macclesfield Town | 3 | (0) |
| Total | | 146 | (28) |
- * Club domestic league appearances and goals

Verdi Godwin BEM (11 February 1926 – 1 December 2013) was an English footballer who played as a forward in the Football League for Blackburn Rovers, Manchester City, Mansfield Town, Middlesbrough, Grimsby Town, Brentford and Stoke City. After retiring as a player, he worked as a scout.

== Career ==
Godwin was born in Blackburn and began his career with local club Blackburn Rovers. He scored six league goals in two seasons at Ewood Park and joined Manchester City in June 1948. He scored three goals in eight matches for City before joining Stoke City, whose manager Bob McGrory saw Godwin as the answer to Stoke's goalscoring problem in 1949–50. However, despite scoring on his debut, Godwin scored just once more in the next 20 league matches and by January he was transferred to Third Division Mansfield Town in part-exchange for Harry Oscroft. Following his spell with the Stags, Godwin became a journeyman and spent short spells with Middlesbrough, Grimsby Town, Brentford, Southport, Barrow, Tranmere Rovers and finally Macclesfield.

== Personal life ==
After retiring from football, Godwin worked during the summer for 36 years as a lifeguard on Southport beach. He was awarded the British Empire Medal in recognition of his service.

== Career statistics ==
Appearances and goals by club, season and competition
| Club | Season | League | | | FA Cup | | Total | |
| Club | Season | Division | Apps | Goals | Apps | Goals | Apps | Goals |
|---|---|---|---|---|---|---|---|---|
| Blackburn Rovers | 1946–47 | First Division | 15 | 1 | 0 | 0 | 15 | 1 |
| Blackburn Rovers | 1947–48 | First Division | 12 | 5 | 0 | 0 | 12 | 5 |
| Blackburn Rovers | Total | | 27 | 6 | 0 | 0 | 27 | 6 |
| Manchester City | 1948–49 | First Division | 8 | 3 | 0 | 0 | 8 | 3 |
| Stoke City | 1949–50 | First Division | 22 | 2 | 1 | 0 | 23 | 2 |
| Mansfield Town | 1949–50 | Third Division North | 17 | 7 | — | | 17 | 7 |
| Mansfield Town | 1950–51 | Third Division North | 14 | 2 | 0 | 0 | 14 | 2 |
| Mansfield Town | Total | | 31 | 9 | 0 | 0 | 31 | 9 |
| Grimsby Town | 1951–52 | Third Division North | 1 | 0 | 0 | 0 | 1 | 0 |
| Brentford | 1951–52 | Second Division | 1 | 0 | — | | 1 | 0 |
| Brentford | 1952–53 | Second Division | 6 | 1 | 0 | 0 | 6 | 1 |
| Brentford | 1953–54 | Second Division | 0 | 0 | 0 | 0 | 0 | 0 |
| Brentford | Total | | 7 | 1 | 0 | 0 | 7 | 1 |
| Southport | 1954–55 | Third Division North | 17 | 2 | 0 | 0 | 17 | 2 |
| Barrow | 1955–56 | Third Division North | 15 | 3 | 1 | 1 | 16 | 4 |
| Tranmere Rovers | 1955–56 | Third Division North | 14 | 2 | — | | 14 | 2 |
| Macclesfield | 1958–59 | Cheshire County League | 3 | 0 | 1 | 0 | 4 | 0 |
| Career Total | | | 145 | 28 | 3 | 1 | 148 | 29 |
