= Roddy Munro =

Scottish footballer

Personal information
- Full name: Roderick Alexander Munro
- Date of birth: 27 July 1920
- Place of birth: Aultbea, Scotland
- Date of death: July 1976 (aged 55–56)
- Place of death: Cambridge, England
- Position: Full back

Senior career*
| Years | Team | Apps | (Gls) |
| 1938–1946 | Rangers | 0 | (0) |
| 1946–1953 | Brentford | 199 | (0) |
| 1946 | → Colchester United (guest) | 1 | (0) |
- Cambridge City
- * Club domestic league appearances and goals

Roderick Alexander Munro (27 July 1920 – July 1976) was a Scottish professional footballer who played as a full back for Brentford and Cambridge City. He is best remembered for his seven years in the Football League with Brentford, for whom he made over 200 appearances.

== Career ==
=== Rangers ===
A full back, Munro began his career in Scotland as an amateur with Scottish League First Division club Rangers in 1938, but the breakout of the Second World War in 1939 and the suspension of professional football brought a halt to his career.

=== Brentford ===
A year after the end of the Second World War in 1945, Munro joined Brentford as an amateur, on the recommendation of Tom Manley, with whom he had served in the Middle East during the war. He played the final five matches of the 1945–46 Football League South season. Munro signed a professional contract during the 1946 off-season and with the resumption of league football, he made his debut in a 5–2 First Division defeat to Aston Villa on 28 September 1946. He made 38 appearances in his debut season, which ended with the Bees suffering relegation to Second Division. Munro was a regular fixture in the team until the end of the 1952–53 season, when he departed Griffin Park. He made 211 appearances during his time with the Bees.

=== Cambridge City ===
Munro ended his career with at Athenian League club Cambridge City.

== Personal life ==
Munro grew up in the hamlet of Aultbea in the Highlands of Scotland. He met his wife Sheena in Cairo while serving in the Second World War and they had two children. While with Brentford, Munro and his wife Sheena provided accommodation for Aultbea-native Hugh Urquhart, who failed to make the grade with the club and dropped into non-League football. The couple settled in Hauxton, Cambridgeshire in the 1950s and worked for Fisons. Munro died in 1976 and was survived by Sheena, who died in Skegness in February 2008.

== Career statistics ==
Appearances and goals by club, season and competition
| Club | Season | League | | | FA Cup | | Total | |
| Club | Season | Division | Apps | Goals | Apps | Goals | Apps | Goals |
|---|---|---|---|---|---|---|---|---|
| Brentford | 1946–47 | First Division | 34 | 0 | 4 | 0 | 38 | 0 |
| Brentford | 1947–48 | Second Division | 21 | 0 | 0 | 0 | 21 | 0 |
| Brentford | 1948–49 | Second Division | 13 | 0 | 0 | 0 | 13 | 0 |
| Brentford | 1949–50 | Second Division | 19 | 0 | 0 | 0 | 19 | 0 |
| Brentford | 1950–51 | Second Division | 38 | 0 | 1 | 0 | 39 | 0 |
| Brentford | 1951–52 | Second Division | 40 | 0 | 4 | 0 | 44 | 0 |
| Brentford | 1952–53 | Second Division | 34 | 0 | 3 | 0 | 37 | 0 |
| Brentford | | | 199 | 0 | 12 | 0 | 211 | 0 |
| Colchester United (guest) | 1945–46 | Southern League | 1 | 0 | ― | | 1 | 0 |
| Career total | | | 200 | 0 | 12 | 0 | 212 | 0 |
