= Fred Monk =

English footballer and coach

Personal information
- Full name: Frederick John Monk
- Date of birth: 9 October 1920
- Place of birth: Brighton, England
- Date of death: October 1987 (aged 66–67)
- Place of death: Aldershot, England
- Positions: Centre forward; right back

Youth career
- Guildford City

Senior career*
Years	Team	Apps	(Gls)
1946–1948	Guildford City		(46)
1948–1954	Brentford	206	(47)
1954–1956	Aldershot	49	(0)

International career
- England Schoolboys

Managerial career
- 1953: Brentford (caretaker)
- * Club domestic league appearances and goals

Frederick John Monk (9 October 1920 – October 1987) was an English professional footballer and coach who played in Football League for Brentford and Aldershot. He is best remembered for his time with Brentford, for whom he made over 200 appearances and served as caretaker manager. He was posthumously inducted into the Brentford Hall of Fame in May 2015.

== Club career ==
=== Guildford City ===
After leaving school, Monk joined the reserve team at Southern League club Guildford City prior to the outbreak of the Second World War. After the war, Monk broke into the first team and scored 29 goals in the 1946–47 season. He scored another 17 goals during the 1947–48 season, before departing in March 1948.

=== Brentford ===
Monk transferred to Second Division club Brentford in March 1948 and made his debut in a 2–0 victory over Tottenham Hotspur at Griffin Park on 20 March. He was Brentford's top-scorer during the 1948–49 season, with 13 goals. A centre forward by trade, Monk moved to right back during the 1949–50 season, but returned to his forward role in January 1951 and set a club record by scoring in 10 consecutive games between January and March 1951. Towards the end of the 1951–52 season, he again reverted to his right back role.

Monk served as player-caretaker manager between the departure of Tommy Lawton and the appointment of Bill Dodgin Sr. early in the 1953–54 season. He left Brentford at the end of the season, after the club's relegation to the Third Division South was confirmed. He made 219 appearances and scored 49 goals for Brentford and he was posthumously inducted into the club's Hall of Fame in May 2015.

=== Aldershot ===
Monk transferred to Third Division South club Aldershot during the 1954 off-season and made 49 league appearances before retiring in 1956.

== International career ==
Monk was an England Schoolboy international.

== Coaching career ==
After his retirement from football, Monk returned to Brentford and worked as the first team's trainer between 1957 and 1962.

== Career statistics ==
=== Player ===
Appearances and goals by club, season and competition
Club	Season	League			FA Cup		Total	
Club	Season	Division	Apps	Goals	Apps	Goals	Apps	Goals
Guildford City	1946–47	Southern League	32	29	0	0	32	29
Brentford	1947–48	Second Division	4	2	—		4	2
Brentford	1948–49	Second Division	37	11	4	2	41	13
Brentford	1949–50	Second Division	25	1	1	0	26	1
Brentford	1950–51	Second Division	37	13	1	0	38	13
Brentford	1951–52	Second Division	40	12	2	0	42	12
Brentford	1952–53	Second Division	40	7	3	0	43	7
Brentford	1953–54	Second Division	23	1	2	0	25	1
Brentford	Total		206	47	13	2	219	49
Career total			238	76	13	2	251	78

=== Manager ===
Team	From	To	Record					Ref
Team	From	To	G	W	D	L	Win %	Ref
Brentford	September 1953	October 1953	2	0	1	1	0.00	
Total			2	0	1	1	0.00	—

== Honours ==
- Brentford Hall of Fame
