= Jimmy Bowie =

Scottish footballer (1924–2000)

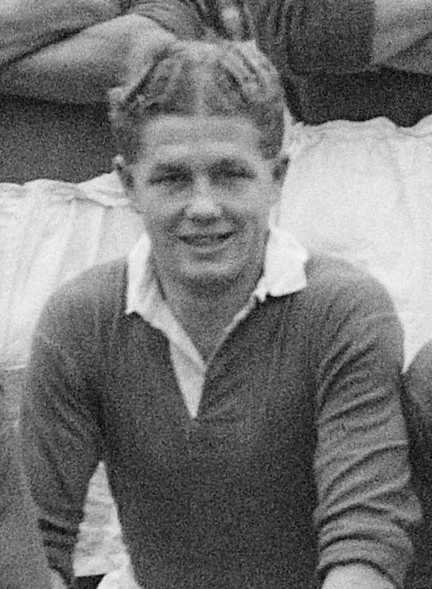
- Bowie while with Chelsea in 1947

Personal information
- Full name: James Duncan Bowie
- Date of birth: 9 August 1924
- Place of birth: Kintore, Scotland
- Date of death: 4 August 2000 (aged 75)
- Place of death: Southend, England
- Position: Inside forward

Senior career*
Years	Team	Apps	(Gls)
1942–1944	Aberdeen Parkvale		
- → Middlesbrough (guest)
- → Hounslow Town (guest)
1944–1951	Chelsea	76	(18)
1951–1952	Fulham	34	(7)
1952	Brentford	9	(0)
1952–1956	Watford	125	(39)
1956–1957	Bedford Town	42	(14)
1957	Headington United	12	(1)
1957–1958	Fulham	0	(0)
1958–1959	March Town United		
1959–19xx	Wisbech Town		
Total		256	(65)

Managerial career
- Trowbridge Town
- * Club domestic league appearances and goals

James Duncan Bowie (9 August 1924 – 4 August 2000) was a Scottish professional footballer who played as an inside forward in the Football League for Watford, Chelsea, Fulham and Brentford. After his retirement from football, he managed Trowbridge Town. As a player, Bowie was described as "a gifted, quicksilver inside forward".

== Playing career ==
Born in Kintore, Aberdeenshire, Bowie began his career with local club Parkvale and turned professional in October 1943. He guested for English clubs Middlesbrough and Hounslow Town and moved to Chelsea for a £25 fee in February 1944. Bowie had to wait until 1947–48, the second season of First Division football after the war, to make his debut and went on to make 84 appearances and score 22 goals before departing in January 1951. After short spells with West London rivals Fulham and Brentford, Bowie dropped down to the Third Division South to join Watford in July 1952. He made 130 appearances and scored 40 goals during 3 1/2 year at Vicarage Road and dropped into non-League football in January 1956. Aside from a return to Fulham in May 1957, for whom he failed to make any further appearances, Bowie played the remainder of his career in non-League football.

== Managerial career ==
After his retirement from football, Bowie managed Western League First Division club Trowbridge Town.

== Personal life ==
Bowie served as a private on home service in the British Army during the Second World War. Later in life, he ran pubs in Northwood, Trowbridge and Great Wakering.

== Career statistics ==
Appearances and goals by club, season and competition
Club	Season	League			FA Cup		Other		Total	
Club	Season	Division	Apps	Goals	Apps	Goals	Apps	Goals	Apps	Goals
Chelsea	1947–48	First Division	22	5	1	1	—		26	6
Chelsea	1948–49	First Division	22	7	3	1	—		25	8
Chelsea	1949–50	First Division	16	4	4	2	—		20	6
Chelsea	1950–51	First Division	16	2	—		—		16	2
Chelsea	Total		76	18	8	4	—		84	22
Fulham	1950–51	First Division	14	3	3	0	—		17	3
Fulham	1951–52	First Division	20	4	1	0	—		21	4
Fulham	Total		34	7	4	0	—		38	7
Brentford	1951–52	Second Division	9	0	—		—		9	0
Watford	1952–53	Third Division South	32	11	0	0	—		32	11
Watford	1953–54	Third Division South	43	20	1	0	—		44	20
Watford	1954–55	Third Division South	40	7	3	1	—		43	8
Watford	1955–56	Third Division South	10	1	0	0	1 (Note: Appearance in Southern Floodlight Cup)	0	11	1
Watford	Total		125	39	4	1	1	0	130	40
Headington United	1956–57	Southern League	12	1	—		—		12	1
Career total			256	65	16	5	1	0	273	70
