= Alf Jefferies (footballer, born 1922) =

English footballer and manager

Personal information
- Full name: Alfred James Jefferies
- Date of birth: 9 February 1922
- Place of birth: Oxford, England
- Date of death: 9 February 1998 (aged 76)
- Place of death: Oxford, England
- Position: Goalkeeper

Youth career
- Arsenal

Senior career*
Years	Team	Apps	(Gls)
1938–1947	Oxford City	169	(0)
1946	→ Colchester United (guest)	1	(0)
1947–1954	Brentford	116	(0)
1954–1955	Torquay United	45	(0)
1955–1956	Banbury Spencer	30	(0)

Managerial career
- Didcot Town
- * Club domestic league appearances and goals

Alfred Jefferies (9 February 1922 – 9 February 1998) was an English professional footballer who played as a goalkeeper in the Football League for Brentford and Torquay United.

== Career ==
=== Early years ===
A goalkeeper, Jefferies began his career as an amateur with Arsenal, before signing for hometown Isthmian League club Oxford City and making an appearance in the club's final competitive match before the outbreak of the Second World War in 1939. He made 169 appearances for the club between 1938 and 1947. While stationed at Colchester Garrison in 1946, he made an appearance for the town's local Southern League club.

=== Brentford ===
Jefferies turned professional and joined Second Division club Brentford in September 1947 and finally made his debut in a 1–0 defeat to Southampton on 29 October 1949. Jefferies went on to largely keep established goalkeepers Ted Gaskell and Reg Newton out of the team, but he finally lost his place to Newton during a disastrous 1953–54 season, in which Brentford were relegated to the Third Division South. He departed Griffin Park in August 1954, after making 121 appearances during seven years with the Bees.

=== Torquay United ===
Jefferies signed for Third Division South club Torquay United in August 1954 and missed just one league game during the 1954–55 season. He left the club at the end of the campaign.

=== Non-League football ===
Jefferies dropped into non-League football and returned home to Oxfordshire to sign for Birmingham & District League First Division club Banbury Spencer in 1955. He made 32 appearances during the 1955–56 season. Jefferies later managed Metropolitan & District League club Didcot Town.

== Personal life ==
Jefferies' brother Ray and son Alan were contracted to Brentford, but neither made a first team appearance.

== Career statistics ==
Appearances and goals by club, season and competition
Club	Season	League			FA Cup		Total	
Club	Season	Division	Apps	Goals	Apps	Goals	Apps	Goals
Colchester United (loan)	1945–46	Southern League	1	0	—		1	0
Brentford	1949–50	Second Division	26	0	1	0	27	0
Brentford	1950–51	Second Division	35	0	1	0	36	0
Brentford	1951–52	Second Division	17	0	0	0	17	0
Brentford	1952–53	Second Division	35	0	3	0	38	0
Brentford	1953–54	Second Division	3	0	0	0	3	0
Brentford	Total		116	0	5	0	121	0
Banbury United	1955–56	Birmingham & District League First Division	30	0	0	0	30	0
Career total			147	0	5	0	152	0
