= Terry Ledgerton =

English footballer

Personal information
- Full name: Terence Ledgerton
- Date of birth: 7 October 1930
- Place of birth: Liverpool, England
- Date of death: December 2004 (aged 74)
- Place of death: Colchester, England
- Position: Outside left

Youth career
- St. Dominic's
- Huyton

Senior career*
Years	Team	Apps	(Gls)
1949–1954	Brentford	40	(8)
1954–1955	Millwall	6	(0)
1955–196?	Clacton Town		
- * Club domestic league appearances and goals

Terence Ledgerton (7 October 1930 – December 2004) was an English footballer who played in the Football League for Brentford and Millwall as an outside left.

== Playing career ==
=== Brentford ===
Ledgerton began his career as a youth in his native Liverpool with spells at St. Dominic's and Huyton. He also represented a Liverpool FA Youth XI. Ledgerton moved on to join the youth team at Second Division club Brentford as an amateur in 1949. He made his debut in a 0–0 draw with West London rivals Queens Park Rangers on 9 February 1952. He established himself as a first team regular during the 1952–53 season and made 31 appearances. Ledgerton's appearances tailed off during the 1953–54 season and he departed the club in May 1954.

=== Millwall ===
Ledgerton joined Third Division South club Millwall in May 1954, in an exchange deal for George Stobbart. He made just 6 appearances for the club, scoring twice, before departing at the end of the 1954–55 season.

=== Clacton Town ===
Ledgerton dropped into non-League football and joined Eastern Counties League club Clacton Town during the 1955 off-season. He bagged 30 goals during the 1955–56 season to set a new goalscoring record at the club and beat his own record by scoring 31 goals in the 1956–57 season, winning the East Anglian Cup. Ledgerton was an integral part of the best years in the club's existence, firing in the goals which led the club to be accepted into the Southern League South-East Division, its highest ever placing in the league pyramid. After suffering relegation at the 1958–59 season, the club won the 1959–60 Southern League First Division title. Ledgerton played for Clacton into the 1960s.

== Personal life ==
Ledgerton's grandson, Matt Waters, also became a footballer and is F.C. Clacton's all-time leading goalscorer.

== Career statistics ==
Appearances and goals by club, season and competition
Club	Season	League			FA Cup		Total	
Club	Season	Division	Apps	Goals	Apps	Goals	Apps	Goals
Brentford	1951–52	Second Division	5	0	1	0	6	0
Brentford	1952–53	Second Division	28	7	3	1	31	8
Brentford	1953–54	Second Division	7	1	3	0	10	1
Brentford	Total		40	8	7	1	47	9
Millwall	1954–55	Third Division South	6	2	0	0	6	2
Career total			46	10	7	1	53	11

== Honours ==
Clacton Town

- East Anglian Cup: 1956–57
- Southern Football League First Division: 1959–60
