= Frank Morrad =

English footballer

Personal information
- Full name: Frank Morrad
- Date of birth: 28 February 1920
- Place of birth: Brentford, England
- Date of death: 13 July 1981 (aged 61)
- Place of death: Mijas, Spain
- Height: 5 ft 9 in (1.75 m)
- Position: Forward

Youth career
- 1936–: Brentford

Senior career*
Years	Team	Apps	(Gls)
- Southall
–1946	Notts County	1	(0)
- → Arsenal (guest)
- → Clapton Orient (guest)
- → Crystal Palace (guest)
1946–1947	Leyton Orient	25	(11)
1947–1948	Fulham	0	(0)
1948–1951	Brighton & Hove Albion	43	(3)
1951–1953	Brentford	6	(2)
1953–1954	Bedford Town	59	(1)
- * Club domestic league appearances and goals

Frank Morrad (28 February 1920 – 13 July 1981) was an English professional footballer who played in the Football League as a forward, most notably for Leyton Orient and Brighton & Hove Albion.

== Playing career ==
Morrad began his career as a junior with Brentford in 1936. He later moved to Athenian League club Southall and began his professional career with Third Division South club Notts County prior to the outbreak of the Second World War. During the war, Morrad guested for Arsenal, Clapton Orient and Crystal Palace, before finally making his professional debut for Notts County in 1946. He moved to fellow Third Division South club Leyton Orient, for whom he had guested during the war, in November 1946. Morrad found his form at Brisbane Road and scored 11 goals in 25 games during the second half of the 1946–47 season. Morrad departed the Os in August 1947 for Second Division club Fulham, but he failed to make an appearance for the club.

Morrad dropped to the Third Division South to join Brighton & Hove Albion in February 1948 and remained with the club until August 1951, when he rejoined hometown club Brentford. He made just six appearances for the Bees and joined Southern League club Bedford Town in 1953, for whom he made 59 appearances before retiring in 1954.

== Personal life ==
After his retirement from football, Morrad ran a chain of betting shops in West London. In the 1960s, he employed former Brentford player Ken Coote as manager of one of the branches.

== Career statistics ==
Appearances and goals by club, season and competition
Club	Season	League			FA Cup		Total	
Club	Season	Division	Apps	Goals	Apps	Goals	Apps	Goals
Notts County	1946–47	Third Division South	1	0	―		1	0
Brentford	1951–52	Second Division	1	1	0	0	1	1
Brentford	1952–53	Second Division	5	1	0	0	5	1
Brentford	Total		6	2	0	0	6	2
Career total			7	2	0	0	7	2
