= Eddie Brown (footballer, born 1927) =

English footballer

Personal information
- Full name: Edward Alfred Cecil Henry Brown
- Date of birth: 4 October 1927
- Place of birth: St Pancras, England
- Date of death: 4 April 1996 (aged 68)
- Place of death: Woking, England
- Position: Centre forward

Senior career*
| Years | Team | Apps | (Gls) |
| 1950 | Brentford | 0 | (0) |
| 1950– | Torquay United | 0 | (0) |
| 1953 | Aldershot | 3 | (0) |
- * Club domestic league appearances and goals

Edward Alfred Cecil Henry Brown (4 October 1927 – 4 April 1996) was an English professional football centre forward who played in the Football League for Aldershot.
