= Ted Gaskell =

English footballer, coach, and manager

Personal information
- Full name: Edward Gaskell
- Date of birth: 19 December 1916
- Place of birth: Bredbury, England
- Date of death: 10 February 2009 (aged 92)
- Place of death: Maidenhead, England
- Height: 5 ft 11 in (1.80 m)
- Position: Goalkeeper

Youth career
- Romiley St. Chad's

Senior career*
Years	Team	Apps	(Gls)
–1936	Stockport County	0	(0)
1936–1937	Chesterfield	0	(0)
1937	Buxton		
1937–1952	Brentford	34	(0)

International career
- Cheshire League XI

Managerial career
- 1952–1954: Hendon
- Wealdstone
- Southall
- 1959–1961: Brentford 'A'
- * Club domestic league appearances and goals

Edward Gaskell (19 December 1916 – 10 February 2009) was an English professional footballer, coach and manager. He is best remembered for his time in the Football League with Brentford, with whom he had a 15-year association as a goalkeeper and coach. He also held coaching positions at non-League clubs Hendon, Wealdstone, Southall and with the Football Association at Lilleshall.

== Playing career ==
=== Early years ===
A goalkeeper, Gaskell began his career playing for local club Romiley St Chad's, before moving to Football League club Stockport County, for whom he failed to make an appearance. He moved to Second Division club Chesterfield in June 1936 and departed the following year, again without making an appearance. After writing to every Cheshire League club in a bid to find a new club, Gaskell was offered a trial at Buxton in 1937 and remained with the club for a short period.

=== Brentford ===
After spurning interest from Aston Villa and declining a trial with Manchester United, Gaskell joined First Division club Brentford on 30 October 1937 for a £500 fee. Third-choice behind James Mathieson and Joe Crozier, Gaskell's hopes of a quick first team debut were delayed due to being forced to undergo an operation to correct an injury suffered in a London Combination match for the reserves in 1938. In the meantime, manager Harry Curtis brought in Frank Clack, which pushed Gaskell even further down the pecking order.

Gaskell ultimately failed to make a professional appearance for the club before the outbreak of the Second World War in September 1939 saw professional football suspended. He remained with the club for a short time during the early part of the war and suffered the ignominy of conceding seven goals in the last 25 minutes of a West London derby with Queens Park Rangers in December 1939. Following the end of hostilities in 1945 and past what he felt were his prime years, Gaskell still found himself behind Joe Crozier in the pecking order and had to wait until 27 December 1947 to make his debut for the Bees, which came over a decade since he signed for the club, in a 2–1 Second Division defeat to former club Leicester City. He managed just one further appearance during the 1947–48 season and just one in the following campaign.

In recognition of over 10 years' service, Gaskell was given a benefit cheque for £750 in 1948 (worth £23,600 in 2025). First-choice goalkeeper Joe Crozier departed Griffin Park in May 1949 and Gaskell took over the position and played the first 14 games of the 1949–50 season, before suffering a kidney injury in a 1–0 defeat to Leeds United on 22 October 1949. He failed to make another appearance during the 1949–50 season and lost his place in the team to Alf Jefferies. After recovering, Gaskell made just two appearances during the 1950–51 season and fell to third in the pecking order behind Jefferies and Reg Newton.

Gaskell managed a run of 19 appearances during the 1951–52 season, which included appearances in the third and fourth rounds of the Bees' FA Cup run. He made up his mind to retire at the end of the season and despite manager Jackie Gibbons trying to persuade him otherwise, Gaskell retired in May 1952. He made just 38 appearances during 15 years with the Bees. He was awarded a joint-testimonial with Tom Manley in April 1954. Gaskell returned to Griffin Park in 2004, as part of the celebrations for the ground's 100th anniversary. At the time of his death in February 2009, Gaskell was Brentford's last-surviving pre-war player and he was posthumously inducted into the club's Hall of Fame in 2019.

== Representative career ==
While with Buxton in 1937, Gaskell represented the Cheshire League representative team against their Southern League counterparts in the annual fixture between the two leagues.

== Managerial and coaching career ==
=== Non-League football ===
Gaskell served as manager of Athenian League clubs Hendon, Wealdstone and Southall in the mid-1950s.

=== Football Association ===
In the mid-1950s, Gaskell was one of the first instructors at Lilleshall, at the time the FA's youth academy. He also took up an offer from former Brentford teammate George Smith to train and coach the England team at Bisham Abbey before international matches. Then-England manager Walter Winterbottom included Gaskell in a coaching programme which visited schools around England and he also coached for the London FA.

=== Brentford 'A' ===
In 1959, Brentford manager Malky McDonald appointed Gaskell manager of the Brentford 'A', the club's third team. Two unremarkable seasons followed in the Seanglian League, though Gaskell identified future first team successes Peter Gelson, Tommy Higginson and John Docherty and played them in the team while they were progressing through the youth and reserve ranks.

== Personal life ==
Gaskell was a Manchester City supporter. While playing non-League football with Buxton, he combined his playing duties with digging holes for the local council. During his early period at Brentford, Gaskell shared a house in Windmill Road with Ted Farrelly. Gaskell served as PT Instructor at Aldershot Barracks during the Second World War and was friends with Frank Swift and Matt Busby while there. In later life, Gaskell worked for Platt's Grocers in Hounslow and later for the Customs service for 20 years. As of June 2004, he was retired and living in Berkshire. Gaskell married Patience in 1944 and they had six children – Paul, Clare, Julia, Philip, Sally and Lynn.

== Career statistics ==
Appearances and goals by club, season and competition
Club	Season	League			FA Cup		Total	
Club	Season	Division	Apps	Goals	Apps	Goals	Apps	Goals
Brentford	1947–48	Second Division	2	0	0	0	2	0
Brentford	1948–49	Second Division	1	0	0	0	1	0
Brentford	1949–50	Second Division	14	0	0	0	14	0
Brentford	1950–51	Second Division	2	0	0	0	2	0
Brentford	1951–52	Second Division	15	0	4	0	19	0
Career total			34	0	4	0	38	0

== Honours ==
Hendon

- Athenian League: 1952–53

Individual

- Brentford Hall of Fame
