= Gerry Gazzard =

English footballer

Personal information
- Full name: Gerald Gazzard
- Date of birth: 15 March 1925
- Place of birth: Cinderford, England
- Date of death: 29 September 2006 (aged 81)
- Place of death: Penzance, England
- Position: Inside forward

Youth career
- Truro City
- Penzance

Senior career*
Years	Team	Apps	(Gls)
1949–1954	West Ham United	119	(29)
1954	Brentford	13	(6)
- Penzance
Total		132	(35)
- * Club domestic league appearances and goals

Gerald Gazzard (15 March 1925 – 29 September 2006) was an English footballer who played for West Ham United and Brentford.

Gazzard was born in Cinderford, Gloucestershire and having previously played as an amateur for Penzance, and made 20 appearances for the County of Cornwall XI, Gazzard signed pro forms at West Ham United in May 1949. He made his debut on the first day of the 1949–50 season, against Luton Town, and played in a total of 37 games that season. He played in 41 games in 1950–51, one game short of being an ever-present.

Gazzard moved to Brentford in 1954, after sustaining a cartilage injury and losing his first team place to John Dick. He later returned to Penzance as an amateur.

His two sons, Paul and Roger, also played for Penzance, and grandson Carl is a former county cricketer for Somerset.
