= Ken Coote =

English footballer

Personal information
- Full name: Kenneth Alexander Coote
- Date of birth: 19 May 1928
- Place of birth: Paddington, England
- Date of death: 2 August 2003 (aged 75)
- Place of death: Isleworth, England
- Height: 5 ft 9 1/2 in (1.77 m)
- Positions: Full back; utility player

Youth career
- Alperton Old Boys

Senior career*
Years	Team	Apps	(Gls)
–1949	Wembley		
1949–1964	Brentford	514	(14)
- * Club domestic league appearances and goals

Kenneth Alexander Coote (19 May 1928 – 2 August 2003) was an English footballer. He is best remembered for his 14 years as a full back and utility player with Brentford, for whom he tops the all-time appearances list with 559 and was also captain of the club. In 2013, Coote placed second in a Football League 125th Anniversary poll of Brentford's best ever captains and he is a member of the club's Hall of Fame.

== Club career ==
=== Early years ===
Coote began his career as a youth at Alperton Old Boys, a team managed by the father of future England manager Ron Greenwood. He moved on to join Middlesex Senior League club Wembley as an amateur and impressed enough to spend two weeks on trial at First Division club Burnley in the spring of 1949.

=== Brentford ===
Ron Greenwood, then playing for Second Division club Brentford, knew of Coote and recommended to manager Jackie Gibbons that Brentford sign him. Coote joined the Bees as an amateur on 26 March 1949 and signed a professional contract on 9 May 1949. He made his debut for the club in a 4–1 defeat to Tottenham Hotspur at Griffin Park on the opening day of the 1949–50 season. He began his Brentford career as an inside left and scored his first goal for the club after 20 seconds of an eventual 4–1 defeat to Blackburn Rovers in September 1949. Coote's Brentford career failed to ignite until player-manager Tommy Lawton selected him as left half for a match versus Notts County in March 1953. Coote gave a strong performance in a 5–0 victory which eased the club's fears of relegation to the Third Division South.

Coote became a near-ever present for Brentford and remained with the club after suffering relegation to the Third Division South in the 1953–54 season. Coote's durability over the next 9 years saw him claim the club record for consecutive FA Cup appearances (30) and aside from playing on both flanks at full back, he also played in six other outfield positions. After missing the first 9 games of the 1954–55 season, Coote missed only 16 of the club's next 378 league games. Ever-increasingly used as a utility man, Coote filled eight different positions during his time at Griffin Park. Attention from First Division clubs Arsenal and West Bromwich Albion came his way, but deals never materialised. At the end of the 1960–61 season, Coote was jointly-awarded a testimonial with Johnny Rainford versus an All Star XI for his service to the club.

Despite his durability, it was only during the 1962–63 season that Coote was an ever-present and he capped his campaign by captaining the Bees to the Fourth Division title. Coote made his final appearance in December 1963 and retired in April 1964, having made 559 appearances for Brentford. Coote's career virtually ran in parallel with goalkeeper Gerry Cakebread and both players were named on the team sheet together 357 times. He remains the club's record appearance-maker and (rarely for a defender) was never booked in his career. Coote was offered opportunities to continue his career in non-League football, but chose to remain in retirement. He was awarded a second testimonial versus West Ham United, managed by Ron Greenwood, in September 1965, from which he earned more than £1,000 (equivalent to £16,900 in 2025). In 2013, Coote placed second in a Football League 125th Anniversary poll of Brentford's best ever captains and he has been inducted into the club's Hall of Fame.

== Representative career ==
Coote's exploits for Brentford saw him win representative honours. He was named as a reserve for the Third Division South representative team in a match against the Third Division North on 2 April 1957. Coote also played for the representative London XI team, which reached the final of the 1955–58 Inter-Cities Fairs Cup. He played in the group stage and semi-final matches against a Basel XI and Lausanne Sports respectively. Coote played in the first leg of the final, which was drawn 2–2 with Barcelona.

== Personal life ==
After completing his National Service and before signing for Brentford, Coote worked for his father in removals. After retiring from football, Coote used the £1,000 earned from his second testimonial match to buy a three-bedroom semi-detached house in the Brentford area. He later became manager of a betting shop in Hounslow, owned by former Brentford teammate Frank Morrad. On 2 August 2003, Coote died aged 75 following a short illness. He had been living in Whitton.

== Career statistics ==
Appearances and goals by club, season and competition
Club	Season	League			FA Cup		League Cup		Total	
Club	Season	Division	Apps	Goals	Apps	Goals	Apps	Goals	Apps	Goals
Brentford	1949–50	Second Division	20	3	0	0	—		20	3
Brentford	1950–51	Second Division	5	1	1	0	—		6	1
Brentford	1951–52	Second Division	24	3	4	1	—		28	4
Brentford	1952–53	Second Division	17	1	0	0	—		17	1
Brentford	1953–54	Second Division	40	0	3	0	—		43	0
Brentford	1954–55	Third Division South	37	1	6	0	—		43	1
Brentford	1955–56	Third Division South	45	2	2	0	—		47	2
Brentford	1956–57	Third Division South	44	1	3	0	—		47	1
Brentford	1957–58	Third Division South	45	2	1	0	—		46	2
Brentford	1958–59	Third Division	44	0	4	0	—		48	0
Brentford	1959–60	Third Division	42	0	2	0	—		44	0
Brentford	1960–61	Third Division	41	0	2	0	3	0	46	0
Brentford	1961–62	Third Division	45	0	5	0	1	0	51	0
Brentford	1962–63	Fourth Division	46	0	1	0	2	0	49	0
Brentford	1963–64	Third Division	19	0	1	0	4	0	24	0
Career total			514	14	35	1	10	0	559	15

== Honours ==
Brentford

- Football League Fourth Division: 1962–63

Individual

- Brentford Supporters' Player of the Year: 1961–62
- Brentford Hall of Fame
