= Martyn Sperrin =

English footballer (born 1956)

Personal information
- Full name: Martyn Robin Sperrin
- Date of birth: 6 December 1956 (age 69)
- Place of birth: Edmonton, England
- Position: Forward

Senior career*
Years	Team	Apps	(Gls)
–1977	Edgware Town		
1977–1978	Luton Town	1	(0)
1978–1981	Barnet	53	(3)
1980–1981	Hendon	25	(2)
–1985	Hertford Town		
1985	Stevenage Borough	15	(9)
- Wealdstone
1985–1986	Ware		(5)
- Bishop's Stortford
- * Club domestic league appearances and goals

Martyn Robin Sperrin (born 6 December 1956) is an English retired semi-professional footballer who made one appearance as a forward in the Football League for Luton Town. He played most of his career in non-League football for Edgware Town, Barnet, Hendon, Wealdstone, Ware, Bishop's Stortford, Stevenage Borough and Hertford Town.

== Personal life ==
Sperrin is the son of footballer Billy Sperrin. He runs a kitchen showroom in Sawbridgeworth.

== Career statistics ==
Appearances and goals by club, season and competition
Club	Season	League			National Cup		League Cup		Other		Total	
Club	Season	Division	Apps	Goals	Apps	Goals	Apps	Goals	Apps	Goals	Apps	Goals
Luton Town	1977–78	Second Division	1	0	0	0	1	0	―		2	0
Barnet	1978–79	Southern League Premier Division	27	3	0	0	―		0	0	27	3
Barnet	1979–80	Alliance Premier League	23	0	1	0	―		2 (Note: Appearances in FA Trophy)	0	26	0
Barnet	1980–81	Alliance Premier League	3	0	0	0	―		0	0	3	0
Barnet	Total		53	3	1		―		2	0	56	3
Hendon	1980–81	Isthmian League Premier Division	19	1	6	1	―		10 (Note: 3 appearances and 2 goals in FA Trophy, 2 appearances and 1 goal in Middlesex Senior Cup, 2 appearances and 1 goal in Middlesex Senior Charity Cup, 2 appearances in Isthmian League Cup, 1 appearance in London Senior Cup)	4	35	6
Hendon	1981–82	Isthmian League Premier Division	6	1	―		―		―		6	1
Hendon	Total		25	2	6	1	―		10	4	41	7
Stevenage Borough	1984–85	Isthmian League Second Division North	15	9	―		―		―		15	9
Career total			94	14	7	1	1	0	12	4	114	19
