= 1946–47 Chelsea F.C. season =

English football club season

Chelsea
1946–47 season
- Chairman: Joe Mears
- Manager: Billy Birrell
- Stadium: Stamford Bridge
- First Division: 15th
- FA Cup: Fourth round
- Top goalscorer: League: Tommy Lawton (26); All: Tommy Lawton (30)
- Highest home attendance: 70,257 vs Arsenal (11 January 1947)
- Lowest home attendance: 17,896 vs Grimsby Town (8 February 1947)
- Average home league attendance: 44,517
- Biggest win: 4–1 v Huddersfield Town (14 December 1946)
- Biggest defeat: 1–6 v Stoke City (15 February 1947)
Home colours	Away colours

The 1946–47 season was Chelsea Football Club's thirty-third competitive season. The season marked the resumption of the Football League, which had been suspended since 1939 due to the Second World War. £14,000 signing Tommy Lawton scored a then-club record 26 league goals, but was unable to help the team to success, as they finished 15th in the First Division.

== Table ==
Pos	Team	Pld	W	D	L	GF	GA	GAv	Pts
13	Arsenal	42	16	9	17	72	70	1.029	41
14	Derby County	42	18	5	19	73	79	0.924	41
15	Chelsea	42	16	7	19	69	84	0.821	39
16	Grimsby Town	42	13	12	17	61	82	0.744	38
17	Blackburn Rovers	42	14	8	20	45	53	0.849	36

Source: World Football
Rules for classification: 1) Points; 2) Goal average; 3) Goals scored
