= Billy Sperrin =

English footballer and coach

Personal information
- Full name: William Thomas Sperrin
- Date of birth: 9 April 1922
- Place of birth: Wood Green, England
- Date of death: 21 June 2000 (aged 78)
- Place of death: Sawbridgeworth, England
- Height: 5 ft 5 in (1.65 m)
- Position: Inside forward

Youth career
- Tottenham Hotspur

Senior career*
Years	Team	Apps	(Gls)
	Tottenham Hotspur	27	(6)
- → Clapton Orient (guest)
- → Fulham (guest)
- → Millwall (guest)
- → Bradford Park Avenue (guest)
	→ Brighton & Hove Albion (guest)	2	
1943–1944	→ Chelsea (guest)	3	(1)
- Finchley
–1949	Guildford City		
1949–1956	Brentford	90	(27)
- Tunbridge Wells United
- Hillingdon Borough
- North Greenford United

Managerial career
- Hillingdon Borough (assistant)
- Hillingdon Borough (caretaker)
- * Club domestic league appearances and goals

William Thomas Sperrin (9 April 1922 – 21 June 2000) was an English football inside forward and coach. He made 100 appearances as a player for Brentford and was later a member of the coaching staff at Hillingdon Borough for 12 years.

== Club career ==
=== Early years ===
An inside forward, Sperrin began his career as an amateur at Second Division club Tottenham Hotspur and also represented Middlesex Schools. His career was interrupted by the outbreak of the Second World War in 1939, but he managed to make 27 wartime appearances for the club, scoring six goals. He also played as a guest for Clapton Orient, Fulham, Millwall, Bradford Park Avenue, Brighton & Hove Albion and Chelsea during the war. After the war, Sperrin dropped into non-league football and had a short spell at Athenian League club Finchley and then spent a season with Southern League club Guildford City.

=== Brentford ===
Sperrin joined Second Division club Brentford in September 1949 and made his debut in a 1–1 draw with Sheffield Wednesday at Griffin Park on 1 October 1949. He gradually broke into the team and scored 11 goals in 35 appearances during the 1951–52 season. Sperrin's appearances subsequently tailed off and he made just 23 appearances between August 1952 and his final appearance in September 1956. In 1956, he was jointly awarded a testimonial with George Bristow, Ken Horne and Reg Newton against an International Managers XI. Sperrin made 100 appearances and scored 30 goals during his seven years at Griffin Park.

=== Non-league football ===
Sperrin dropped back into non-league football in 1956, linking up with fellow Brentford departee Reg Newton at Kent League First Division club Tunbridge Wells United. He ended his career with a 14-year spell at Southern League club Hillingdon Borough and finally North Greenford United.

== Coaching career ==
After his retirement as a player, Sperrin went on to serve Yiewsley (later named Hillingdon Borough) for 12 years in the trainer, coach, assistant manager and caretaker manager roles. As assistant manager, he had the honour of leading the team out for the 1971 FA Trophy final at Wembley Stadium, as player-manager Jim Langley had included himself in the starting lineup.

== Personal life ==
Sperrin's brother James was also a footballer and the brothers' early careers mirrored each other, with both on the books at Tottenham Hotspur and later signing for Finchley. Sperrin's son Martyn was also a footballer.

== Honours ==
Hillingdon Borough

- Southern League First Division second-place promotion: 1965–66

== Career statistics ==
Appearances and goals by club, season and competition
Club	Season	League			FA Cup		Total	
Club	Season	Division	Apps	Goals	Apps	Goals	Apps	Goals
Brentford	1949–50	Second Division	14	3	1	0	15	3
Brentford	1950–51	Second Division	26	11	1	0	27	11
Brentford	1951–52	Second Division	31	9	4	2	35	11
Brentford	1952–53	Second Division	12	3	3	0	15	3
Brentford	1953–54	Second Division	2	0	1	1	3	1
Brentford	1954–55	Third Division South	3	1	0	0	3	1
Brentford	1955–56	Third Division South	2	0	0	0	2	0
Career total			90	27	10	3	100	30
