= 1956–57 Southern Football League =

The 1956–57 Southern Football League season was the 54th in the history of the league, an English football competition.

No new clubs had joined the league for this season so the league consisted of 22 clubs from previous season. Kettering Town were champions, winning their first Southern League title. Five Southern League clubs applied to join the Football League at the end of the season, but none were successful. At the end of the season Welsh FA refused to sanction Llanelly's stay in the Southern League, the club left the league after seven years and switched to the Welsh football pyramid.

== League table ==
Southern Football League
- Season: 1956–57
- Champions: Kettering Town
- Matches: 462
- Goals: 1,613 (3.49 per match)

Pos	Team	Pld	W	D	L	GF	GA	GR	Pts	Results
1	Kettering Town	42	28	10	4	106	47	2.255	66	
2	Bedford Town	42	25	8	9	89	52	1.712	58	
3	Weymouth	42	22	10	10	92	71	1.296	54	
4	Cheltenham Town	42	19	15	8	73	46	1.587	53	
5	Gravesend & Northfleet	42	21	11	10	74	58	1.276	53	
6	Lovells Athletic	42	21	7	14	99	84	1.179	49	
7	Guildford City	42	18	11	13	68	49	1.388	47	
8	Hereford United	42	19	8	15	96	60	1.600	46	
9	Headington United	42	19	7	16	64	61	1.049	45	
10	Gloucester City	42	18	8	16	74	72	1.028	44	
11	Hastings United	42	17	9	16	70	58	1.207	43	
12	Worcester City	42	16	10	16	81	80	1.013	42	
13	Dartford	42	16	10	16	79	88	0.898	42	
14	Chelmsford City	42	16	9	17	73	85	0.859	41	
15	Tonbridge	42	14	12	16	74	65	1.138	40	
16	Yeovil Town	42	14	11	17	83	85	0.976	39	
17	Bath City	42	15	8	19	56	78	0.718	38	
18	Exeter City II	42	10	10	22	52	89	0.584	30	
19	Merthyr Tydfil	42	9	11	22	72	95	0.758	29	
20	Barry Town	42	6	11	25	39	84	0.464	23	
21	Kidderminster Harriers	42	7	10	25	60	83	0.723	20 (Note: Kidderminster Harriers were deducted four points.)	
22	Llanelly	42	5	8	29	39	123	0.317	18	Left the league

Source: rsssf.com
Rules for classification: 1) points; 2) goal ratio.

== Football League elections ==
Five Southern League clubs applied for election to the Football League. However, none were successful as all four League clubs were re-elected.

Club	League	Votes
Norwich City	Football League	48
Tranmere Rovers	Football League	48
Crewe Alexandra	Football League	47
Swindon Town	Football League	42
Peterborough United	Midland League	7
Bedford Town	Southern League	1
Burton Albion	Birmingham & District League	1
Wigan Athletic	Lancashire Combination	1
Headington United	Southern League	0
Kettering Town	Southern League	0
King's Lynn	Midland League	0
Morecambe	Lancashire Combination	0
Nelson	Lancashire Combination	0
North Shields	North Eastern League	0
Worcester City	Southern League	0
Yeovil Town	Southern League	0
