= David Richards (footballer, born 1896) =

English footballer

Personal information
- Full name: David Richards
- Date of birth: 1 October 1896
- Place of birth: Wolverhampton, England
- Date of death: 25 June 1971 (aged 74)
- Place of death: Hammersmith, England
- Position: Half-back

Youth career
- Larkhall Thistle

Senior career*
Years	Team	Apps	(Gls)
1922–1923	Port Vale	1	(0)
1923–1925	Dundee United	49	(3)
1925–1931	Luton Town	147	(0)
1931–1933	Watford	35	(0)
Total		232	(3)
- * Club domestic league appearances and goals

David Richards (1 October 1896 – 25 June 1971) was an English footballer who played professionally for Port Vale, Dundee United, Luton Town and Watford. He made 232 league appearances in an eleven-year career in the English and Scottish leagues between 1922 and 1933. His only honour was to help Dundee United to win the Second Division title in 1924–25.

== Early life ==
Richards was born in Wolverhampton on 1 October 1896, but grew up in Lanarkshire.

== Playing career ==
Richards played for Larkhall Thistle before travelling to England to join Port Vale in August 1922. His only appearance was at centre-half in a 1–0 defeat at Notts County on 28 October 1922, and he was released at the end of the season.

Richards then became one of new Dundee Hibernian manager Jimmy Brownlie's first signings for the 1923–24 season, and made his debut for "Hibs" in a Penman Cup tie against St Johnstone on 15 August 1923. Two months later, the club changed its name mid-season, with Richards being one of the players who appeared in their first match under the new identity of Dundee United. He spent two seasons with the club, making over 50 competitive appearances and winning promotion as champions of Second Division in the 1924–25 season. Although Dundee United hoped to keep the promotion-winning squad intact for their first season in the top division, Richards departed after accepting an offer from Luton Town.

The "Hatters" finished seventh in the Third Division South in 1925–26, eighth in 1926–27, 13th in 1927–28, seventh in 1928–29, 13th in 1929–30, and seventh again in 1930–31. He made 147 league appearances in his six years at Kenilworth Road. After leaving Luton, he joined league rivals Watford on a free transfer. Richards made 43 appearances in all competitions over two seasons at Vicarage Road, as the "Hornets" posted eleventh-place finishes in 1931–32 and 1932–33.

== Coaching career ==
Upon his retirement as a player he became a trainer at Queen's Park Rangers. He became a trainer at Chelmsford City just before World War II, and after the war became a masseur at Walsall, moving on to become a trainer at Brentford in August 1950.

== Outside football ==
Richards also worked as a masseur for Middlesex County Cricket Club. A trained singer, he ran concert parties in Luton during the 1930s.

== Career statistics ==
Appearances and goals by club, season and competition
Club	Season	League			FA Cup		Total	
Club	Season	Division	Apps	Goals	Apps	Goals	Apps	Goals
Port Vale	1922–23	Second Division	1	0	0	0	1	0
Luton Town	1925–26	Third Division South	18	0	2	0	20	0
Luton Town	1926–27	Third Division South	29	0	2	0	31	0
Luton Town	1927–28	Third Division South	21	0	0	0	21	0
Luton Town	1928–29	Third Division South	27	0	0	0	27	0
Luton Town	1929–30	Third Division South	38	0	1	0	39	0
Luton Town	1930–31	Third Division South	14	0	0	0	14	0
Luton Town	Total		147	0	5	0	152	0
Watford	1931–32	Third Division South	28	0	8	0	36	0
Watford	1932–33	Third Division South	7	0	0	0	7	0
Watford	Total		35	0	8	0	43	0

== Honours ==
Dundee United

- Scottish Football League Second Division: 1924–25
