= Jack Jordan (footballer) =

Scottish footballer (1924–2007)

Personal information
- Full name: John Jordan
- Date of birth: 25 February 1924
- Place of birth: Glasgow, Scotland
- Date of death: 23 June 2007 (aged 83)
- Place of death: Glasgow, Scotland
- Position: Outside right

Youth career
- Possil Glenfield

Senior career*
Years	Team	Apps	(Gls)
1942–1946	Queen's Park	2	(0)
1946–1947	Celtic	3	(1)
1947	Edinburgh City	0	(0)
1947	Heart of Midlothian	0	(0)
1947	Aberdeen	0	(0)
1947–1948	Alloa Athletic	0	(0)
1948–1949	Reading	3	(0)
1949–	Brentford	0	(0)
- Pollok
1955	Berwick Rangers	0	(0)
- * Club domestic league appearances and goals

John Jordan (25 February 1924 – 23 June 2007) was a Scottish professional footballer who played as an outside right in the Scottish League for Celtic and Queen's Park.

== Career statistics ==
Appearances and goals by club, season and competition
Club	Season	League			National Cup		League Cup		Other		Total	
Club	Season	Division	Apps	Goals	Apps	Goals	Apps	Goals	Apps	Goals	Apps	Goals
Queen's Park	1946–47	Scottish First Division	2	0	0	0	—		1 (Note: Appearance in Glasgow Cup)	0	3	0
Celtic	1946–47	Scottish First Division	3	1	0	0	0	0	—		3	1
Heart of Midlothian	1947–48	Scottish First Division	0	0	0	0	0	0	1 (Note: Appearance in Penman Cup)	5	1	5
Career total			5	1	0	0	0	0	2	5	7	6
