= Tecwyn Jones (footballer, born 1930) =

Welsh footballer

Personal information
- Date of birth: 3 January 1930
- Place of birth: Holywell, Wales
- Date of death: 29 December 2008 (aged 78)
- Place of death: Hammersmith, England
- Height: 5 ft 9 in (1.75 m)
- Position: Full back

Youth career
- Holywell Town

Senior career*
Years	Team	Apps	(Gls)
1950–1953	Brentford	5	(0)
1953–1954	Wrexham	4	(0)
- Chelmsford City
- Dartford
- * Club domestic league appearances and goals

Tecwyn Jones (3 January 1930 – 29 December 2008) was a Welsh professional footballer who played in the Football League for Brentford and Wrexham as a full back. He also played non-League football for Chelmsford City and Dartford.

== Career statistics ==
Appearances and goals by club, season and competition
Club	Season	League			FA Cup		Total	
Club	Season	Division	Apps	Goals	Apps	Goals	Apps	Goals
Brentford	1951–52	Second Division	1	0	0	0	1	0
Brentford	1952–53	Second Division	4	0	0	0	4	0
Brentford	Total		5	0	0	0	5	0
Wrexham	1953–54	Third Division North	4	0	1	0	5	0
Career total			9	0	1	0	10	0
