= Dave Jones (footballer, born 1932) =

Welsh footballer (1932–2022)

Personal information
- Full name: David Jones
- Date of birth: 7 January 1932
- Place of birth: Aberdare, Wales
- Date of death: September 2022 (aged 90)
- Position: Goalkeeper

Senior career*
Years	Team	Apps	(Gls)
?–1951	Dover		
1951–1953	Brentford	0	(0)
1953–1961	Reading	215	(0)
1961–1966	Aldershot	187	(0)
1966–????	Dartford		
Total		402	(0)
- * Club domestic league appearances and goals

David Jones (7 January 1932 – September 2022) was a Welsh footballer who played as a goalkeeper. He played for Dover, Brentford, Reading, Aldershot and Dartford. Jones died in September 2022, at the age of 90.
