= Jackie Goodwin =

English footballer

Personal information
- Full name: John William Goodwin
- Date of birth: 29 September 1920
- Place of birth: Worcester, England
- Date of death: 7 May 1995 (aged 74)
- Place of death: Worcester, England
- Position: Outside right

Senior career*
Years	Team	Apps	(Gls)
19??–1946	Worcester City		
1946–1949	Birmingham City	32	(8)
1949–1954	Brentford	131	(22)
1954–19??	Dartford		

Managerial career
- 1965: Toronto Inter-Roma
- * Club domestic league appearances and goals

John William Goodwin (29 September 1920 – 7 May 1995) was an English professional footballer who scored 30 goals from 163 appearances in the Football League playing for Birmingham City and Brentford. He played as an outside right.

== Playing career ==
Goodwin was born in Worcester. When he was demobbed after the Second World War, Goodwin joined Birmingham City from Southern League club Worcester City. Described as a "sturdily-built ... bustler", he made his debut in the Second Division on 18 September 1946, deputising for Neil Dougall at inside right in an away game against West Bromwich Albion which Birmingham lost 3–0. He played only intermittently while Jock Mulraney remained first choice on the wing, but by the middle of the 1947–48 season had accumulated 31 league games and made his contribution to the club's Second Division title. He lost his place on the arrival of Jackie Stewart, playing only once in the First Division, and in April 1949 Goodwin together with teammate Wally Quinton joined Brentford. In five seasons with Brentford Goodwin played 131 matches in the Second Division and scored 22 goals. At the end of the 1947–48 season he moved into non-league football with Dartford.

== Later career ==
In 1957 Goodwin joined the coaching staff at Brentford, remaining there for six years. In the late 1960s and early 1970s, he coached the Old Harrovian football club, and also coached in the United States. In 1965 he served as the manager for Toronto Inter-Roma in the Eastern Canada Professional Soccer League. Outside football, he worked for a gas company.

Goodwin died in Worcester in 1995, at the age of 74, after collapsing during a VE Day parade.
