= Jackie Gibbons =

English footballer and manager (1914–1984)

Personal information
- Full name: Albert Henry Gibbons
- Date of birth: 10 April 1914
- Place of birth: Fulham, England
- Date of death: 4 July 1984 (aged 70)
- Place of death: Johannesburg, South Africa
- Height: 5 ft 9 in (1.75 m)
- Position: Centre forward

Senior career*
| Years | Team | Apps | (Gls) |
- Kingstonian
- Uxbridge
| 1937 | Hayes | 3 | (0) |
| 1937–1938 | Tottenham Hotspur | 27 | (13) |
| 1938–1939 | Brentford | 11 | (1) |
| 1939 | Tottenham Hotspur | 0 | (0) |
| 1945–1947 | Bradford Park Avenue | 42 | (21) |
| 1947–1949 | Brentford | 56 | (16) |
| Total | | 139 | (62) |

International career
| 1938–1939 | England Amateurs | 6 | (6) |
| 1939 | FA XI | | |
| 1942 | England (wartime) | 1 | (0) |

Managerial career
- 1949–1952: Brentford
- 1953–1956: Daring Club Bruxelles
- 1956: Israel
- 1956–1957: Hapoel Petah Tikva
- 1961–1963: Hapoel Jerusalem
- 1963–1965: Rangers
- Transvaal
- 1966–1967: Kenya
Medal record
Men's football
Representing Israel (as manager)
AFC Asian Cup
| Runner-up | 1956 Hong Kong |
- * Club domestic league appearances and goals

Albert Henry Gibbons (10 April 1914 – 4 July 1984) was an English professional footballer and manager who played in the Football League for Tottenham Hotspur, Brentford and Bradford Park Avenue. After his retirement as a player, he managed in England, Israel, South Africa and at international level.

== Playing career ==
=== Amateur years (1937–1945) ===
A centre forward who remained an amateur for the first part of his career, Gibbons played for non-League clubs Uxbridge, Hayes and Kingstonian. Had it not been for family influence, he may have turned professional with Fulham in late 1934. Gibbons joined Football League Second Division club Tottenham Hotspur in July 1937 and scored on his debut, in a 3–0 victory at Sheffield Wednesday on 16 September 1937. Owing to his RAF service, he obtained the nickname "Wings" amongst the Spurs support and made 36 appearances and scored 18 goals during the 1937–38 season, with 12 of his strikes coming in the form of hat-tricks in four consecutive games mid-season. He joined First Division club Brentford in August 1938 and made 11 appearances and scored one goal during a poor 1938–39 season for the Bees. Gibbons re-joined Tottenham Hotspur in 1939, but failed to make an appearance in his second spell with the White Hart Lane club.

=== Professional years (1945–1949) ===
The Second World War halted Gibbons' career between 1939 and 1945 and during the war, he guested for Bradford Park Avenue, Brentford, Chelsea, Fulham and Reading. In 1945, Gibbons turned professional and signed with Bradford Park Avenue to play the 1945–46 season in the wartime league and an expanded FA Cup. The Avenue advanced to the sixth round, with Gibbons scoring four goals in an 8–2 fourth round second leg win over Manchester City on 30 January 1946. Avenue were admitted to the Second Division for the 1946–47 season and he made 42 league appearances and scored 21 goals. In August 1947, Gibbons returned to Brentford, newly relegated to the Second Division, for a club record £8,000 fee. He was the club's top scorer during the 1947–48 season, scoring 13 times. Across his two spells with Brentford, Gibbons made a total of 71 appearances and scored 19 goals before retiring in February 1949.

== Managerial career ==
=== Brentford ===
Gibbons became manager of Second Division club Brentford in February 1949, taking over from Harry Curtis, the most successful manager in the club's history. Gibbons had been groomed to succeed Curtis at the helm. In March 1949, Gibbons brought former Bradford Park Avenue teammate and future England manager Ron Greenwood to the club he supported as a boy and later named him captain. In February 1951, Gibbons brought football analyst Charles Reep to Griffin Park on a part-time basis until the end of the 1950–51 season. Reep helped improve the team's goals-to-games ratio, which saved them from relegation.

Gibbons managed Brentford until the end of the 1951–52 season, making three consecutive top 10 finishes in the Second Division, but he found himself at odds with the club's board during a difficult time financially for the Bees. A falling out with star wing halves Jimmy Hill and Ron Greenwood towards the end of 1951 saw the Bees' form tail off, with the club finishing the 1951–52 season in 10th place, after challenging for promotion in mid-season. Gibbons resigned in August 1952 and was replaced by his assistant, Jimmy Bain.

=== Daring Club Bruxelles ===
Gibbons took over as manager of Belgian club Daring Club Bruxelles in 1953 and won the 1954–55 Second Division championship with the club.

=== Israel ===
Gibbons took charge of the Israel national football team in 1956. His tenure began with a 7–1 aggregate defeat over two legs to the Soviet Union in qualifying for the 1956 Summer Olympics. In September 1956, Gibbons presided over Israel's inaugural AFC Asian Cup campaign, defeating Hong Kong and South Vietnam on the way to finishing as runners-up to South Korea. After leaving the job, Gibbons stayed on in Israel to manage Liga Leumit club Hapoel Petah Tikva and guided the club to a runners-up finish in the 1956–57 season. After a spell coaching in Australia, he returned to Israel to manage Hapoel Jerusalem between 1961 and 1963.

=== Africa ===
Gibbons moved to South Africa to manage clubs Rangers and Transvaal. He accepted his final managerial position in 1966, when he was named as manager of Kenya. He stayed in the job until October 1967, when he was replaced by his assistant, Elijah Lidonde.

== International career ==
Gibbons was called up to the Football Association representative team for a tour of South Africa in 1939. He scored six goals in six caps for England Amateurs in 1938 and 1939 and won one cap for the full England team during the Second World War.

== Personal life ==
Gibbons attended West Kensington Central School. During the 1930s and through the Second World War, he served in the Royal Air Force and was demobbed in 1946. During the 1960s, Gibbons worked in Kenya for Coca-Cola.

== Career statistics ==
=== Player ===
Appearances and goals by club, season and competition
| Club | Season | League | | | FA Cup | | Total | |
| Club | Season | Division | Apps | Goals | Apps | Goals | Apps | Goals |
|---|---|---|---|---|---|---|---|---|
| Tottenham Hotspur | 1937–38 | Second Division | 27 | 13 | 6 | 5 | 33 | 18 |
| Brentford | 1938–39 | First Division | 11 | 1 | 0 | 0 | 11 | 1 |
| Brentford | 1947–48 | Second Division | 41 | 13 | 2 | 1 | 43 | 14 |
| Brentford | 1948–49 | Second Division | 15 | 3 | 2 | 1 | 17 | 4 |
| Brentford | Total | | 67 | 17 | 4 | 2 | 71 | 19 |
| Career total | | | 94 | 30 | 10 | 7 | 104 | 37 |

=== Manager ===
| Team | From | To | Record | | | | | Ref |
| Team | From | To | G | W | D | L | Win % | Ref |
|---|---|---|---|---|---|---|---|---|
| Brentford | February 1949 | August 1952 | 148 | 52 | 40 | 56 | 35.14 | |
| Israel | 1956 | 1956 | 5 | 2 | 0 | 3 | 40.00 | |
| Total | | | 153 | 54 | 40 | 59 | 35.29 | — |

== Honours ==
=== As player ===
Kingstonian

- Isthmian League: 1936–37

=== As manager ===
Daring Club Bruxelles

- Belgian Second Division: 1954–55

Israel

- AFC Asian Cup runner-up: 1956
