= Billy Dare =

English footballer (1927–1994)

- Dare with West Ham United

Personal information
- Full name: William Thomas Charles Dare
- Date of birth: 14 February 1927
- Place of birth: Willesden, England
- Date of death: 8 May 1994 (aged 67)
- Place of death: Hillingdon, England
- Position: Striker

Senior career*
Years	Team	Apps	(Gls)
1948	Hendon	5	(4)
1948–1955	Brentford	208	(62)
1955–1959	West Ham United	111	(44)
1959–?	Yiewsley		

Managerial career
- Ruislip Manor
- * Club domestic league appearances and goals

William Thomas Charles Dare (14 February 1927 – 8 May 1994) was an English footballer who played as a forward. He was described as "gutsy" and as a "stocky little battler" and was the first ever footballer to sign for a club on live television.

Dare was born in Willesden, London and started his footballing career with Hendon. He played only 10 games for Hendon, starting with his debut game on 11 September 1948 against Leyton, but managed eight goals. He joined Brentford in 1948, where he was teammates with Ron Greenwood. His Brentford debut came on 12 March 1949 against Luton Town. He made 208 league appearances and 222 in all competitions, before joining West Ham United for £5,000 in 1955.

A prolific goal scorer, Dare scored 52 goals in 125 games in all competitions for West Ham United. He made his Hammers debut on 5 March 1955 in a 2–1 home win against Leeds United. His first goal didn't come until two games later, on 19 March 1955, in a 2–1 home defeat of Middlesbrough. His 25 goals in all competitions in 1955–56 made him the club's highest scorer for that season.

Dare, playing alongside Johnny Dick and Vic Keeble, played in the club's Second Division championship-winning season of 1957–58. Dare contributed 14 league goals, including one hat-trick in a 3–2 defeat of Bristol Rovers at Eastville on 31 August 1957, to a campaign in which West Ham scored 101 league goals. However, the now ageing forward struggled at the higher level, and Dare played only two games between February 1958 and April 1959 before his transfer in 1959.

The 1959–60 season saw Dare play for Southern League team Yiewsley, where he played under Bill Dodgin, Sr. and later Jackie Milburn. He served as manager of Spartan League side Ruislip Manor in the mid-1960s.

== Honours ==
West Ham United

- Football League Second Division: 1957–58

Individual

- Brentford Hall of Fame
