= 1956–57 Brentford F.C. season =

English football team season

Brentford
1956–57 season
- Chairman: Frank Davis
- Manager: Bill Dodgin Sr.
- Stadium: Griffin Park
- Third Division South: 8th
- FA Cup: Second round
- Top goalscorer: League: Francis (23); All: Francis (24)
- Highest home attendance: 18,760
- Lowest home attendance: 6,088
- Average home league attendance: 11,482
Home colours

During the 1956–57 English football season, Brentford competed in the Football League Third Division South. Despite topping the table early in the season, a poor run of form dropped the club to the lower reaches of mid-table by February 1957. A strong final two months of the season lifted the Bees to an 8th-place finish.

== Season summary ==
With Brentford having failed to challenge for promotion since relegation to the Third Division South in 1954, reduced attendances at Griffin Park meant that manager Bill Dodgin Sr. again had little to spend in the transfer market, with his lone acquisition being full back Sid Russell from local Sunday league football. Frank Latimer and Billy Sperrin were released after many years' service, in addition to more recent signings Leonard Geard, James Robertson and George Stobbart.

Brentford had a dream start to the 1956–57 season, winning the opening four matches and sitting atop the table. Three subsequent defeats dropped the Bees to as low as 13th-place, before top spot was again reached after another three wins in September 1956. Forwards Jeff Taylor and George Francis (supported by Jim Towers) were in imperious form, with Taylor having scored 9 goals and Francis 8 goals after 10 matches. A 4–0 defeat away to Ipswich Town on 22 September ended the run and Brentford won just three of next 20 league matches, with Taylor and Francis completely losing form and Towers spending periods out injured. The signing of Chelsea forward Eric Parsons had little impact.

The Bees reached their nadir on 19 January 1957, losing 7–0 to Walsall, a scoreline which equalled the club's record defeat. Three matches later, Brentford lost 5–1 to Northampton Town and completed a slide from 1st position on 18 September 1956 to 17th on 16 February 1957. Jim Towers' return to full fitness coincided with the team's return to form in March, with George Francis scoring five goals amidst a run of four consecutive wins. After victory over Southend United on 12 March, chairman Frank Davis announced that manager Bill Dodgin Sr. would be leaving Griffin Park at the end of the campaign. Brentford lost just two of the remaining 11 matches of the season and battled to an 8th-place finish.

A number of club records were set or equalled during the season:

- Record league defeat: 0–7 versus Walsall, 19 January 1957
- Consecutive away league wins: 5 (21 April – 29 August 1956)
- Consecutive league draws: 5 (16 March – 6 April 1957)
- Most home league games without a clean sheet: 16 (3 March – 20 October 1956)

== League table ==
Pos	Team	Pld	W	D	L	GF	GA	GAv	Pts
6	Brighton & Hove Albion	46	19	14	13	86	65	1.323	52
7	Southend United	46	18	12	16	73	65	1.123	48
8	Brentford	46	16	16	14	78	76	1.026	48
9	Shrewsbury Town	46	15	18	13	72	79	0.911	48
10	Queens Park Rangers	46	18	11	17	61	60	1.017	47

== Results ==
Brentford's goal tally listed first.

=== Legend ===
Win	Draw	Loss

=== Football League Third Division South ===
No.	Date	Opponent	Venue	Result	Attendance	Scorer(s)
1	18 August 1956	Plymouth Argyle	H	4–1	13,710	Newcombe, Goundry, Taylor, Towers
2	21 August 1956	Swindon Town	H	4–1	13,510	Towers, Taylor (2), Bragg (pen)
3	25 August 1956	Aldershot	A	2–0	7,043	Towers, Francis
4	29 August 1956	Swindon Town	A	3–1	11,995	Taylor (2), Francis
5	1 September 1956	Watford	H	1–5	18,760	Towers
6	4 September 1956	Brighton & Hove Albion	H	2–5	12,191	Goundry, Towers
7	8 September 1956	Shrewsbury Town	A	2–3	8,953	Francis, Taylor
8	12 September 1956	Brighton & Hove Albion	A	2–1	14,317	Goundry, Francis
9	15 September 1956	Walsall	H	6–2	11,492	Taylor (3), Bristow, Goundry, Francis
10	18 September 1956	Gillingham	H	3–2	15,603	Francis (3)
11	22 September 1956	Ipswich Town	A	0–4	12,888	
12	26 September 1956	Gillingham	A	1–2	7,903	Morgan
13	29 September 1956	Bournemouth & Boscombe Athletic	H	2–2	12,604	Francis, Newcombe
14	6 October 1956	Northampton Town	H	2–1	10,733	Coleman (og), Francis
15	13 October 1956	Southend United	A	0–1	11,463	
16	20 October 1956	Crystal Palace	H	1–1	11,345	Taylor
17	27 October 1956	Exeter City	A	1–1	8,482	Francis
18	3 November 1956	Southampton	H	4–0	14,198	Francis (4)
19	10 November 1956	Coventry City	A	1–1	9,884	Peplow (pen)
20	24 November 1956	Colchester United	A	0–1	7,290	
21	1 December 1956	Newport County	H	0–0	11,130	
22	15 December 1956	Plymouth Argyle	A	0–2	6,823	
23	22 December 1956	Aldershot	H	2–2	7,284	Parsons, Towers
24	25 December 1956	Torquay United	H	0–0	9,024	
25	26 December 1956	Torquay United	A	0–2	9,540	
26	29 December 1956	Watford	A	1–1	8,416	Dudley
27	12 January 1957	Shrewsbury Town	H	3–1	8,952	Rainford, Dudley, Goundry
28	19 January 1957	Walsall	A	0–7	13,892	
29	2 February 1957	Ipswich Town	H	1–1	10,538	Rees (og)
30	9 February 1957	Bournemouth & Boscombe Athletic	A	0–3	10,898	
31	16 February 1957	Northampton Town	A	0–5	9,306	
32	2 March 1957	Crystal Palace	A	2–0	11,679	Parsons (2)
33	4 March 1957	Millwall	H	5–0	6,088	Taylor, Towers, Francis, Coote, Goundry
34	9 March 1957	Reading	H	4–0	10,223	Francis (2), Taylor, McLaren (og)
35	12 March 1957	Southend United	H	3–2	11,941	Francis (2), Towers
36	16 March 1957	Southampton	A	3–3	12,166	Parsons, Newcombe, Towers
37	18 March 1957	Millwall	A	1–1	8,726	Towers
38	23 March 1957	Coventry City	H	1–1	10,058	Taylor
39	30 March 1957	Norwich City	A	1–1	11,685	McNeil (og)
40	6 April 1957	Colchester United	H	1–1	12,846	Taylor
41	13 April 1957	Newport County	A	0–3	5,415	
42	19 April 1957	Queens Park Rangers	H	2–0	13,841	Towers (2)
43	20 April 1957	Exeter City	H	3–0	9,262	Taylor, Harvey (og), Francis
44	22 April 1957	Queens Park Rangers	A	2–2	9,661	Dargie, Francis
45	27 April 1957	Norwich City	H	1–1	8,764	Bragg (pen)
46	1 May 1957	Reading	A	0–2	4,203	

=== FA Cup ===
Round	Date	Opponent	Venue	Result	Attendance	Scorer(s)
1R	17 November 1956	Guildford City	H	3–0	13,450	Morton (og), Taylor, Beale (og)
2R	8 December 1956	Crystal Palace	H	1–1	16,750	Taylor
2R (replay)	12 December 1956	Crystal Palace	A	2–3 (a.e.t.)	23,136	Towers, Francis

- Sources: 100 Years Of Brentford, Statto, 11v11

== Playing squad ==
Players' ages are as of the opening day of the 1956–57 season.

Pos.	Name	Nat.	Date of birth (age)	Signed from	Signed in	Notes
Goalkeepers						
GK	Gerry Cakebread	(England)	1 April 1936 (aged 20)	Youth	1954	
GK	Sonny Feehan	(Republic of Ireland)	17 September 1926 (aged 29)	Northampton Town	1954	
Defenders
DF	Alan Bassham	(England)	3 October 1933 (aged 22)	Youth	1953	
DF	Wally Bragg	(England)	8 July 1929 (aged 27)	Twickenham Celtic	1946	
DF	Ken Horne	(England)	25 June 1926 (aged 30)	Blackpool	1950	
DF	George Lowden	(England)	2 March 1933 (aged 23)	Unattached	1951	
DF	Sid Russell	(England)	4 October 1937 (aged 18)	Jolly X	1956	
Midfielders
HB	George Bristow	(England)	25 June 1933 (aged 23)	Youth	1950	
HB	Ken Coote	(England)	19 May 1928 (aged 28)	Wembley	1949	
HB	Ian Dargie	(England)	3 October 1931 (aged 24)	Tonbridge	1952	
HB	Wendell Morgan	(Wales)	22 April 1935 (aged 21)	Cardiff City	1954	
HB	Ron Peplow	(England)	4 May 1935 (aged 21)	Southall	1955	
HB	Terry Robinson	(England)	8 November 1929 (aged 26)	Loughborough College	1954	Amateur
HB	Len Roe	(England)	11 January 1932 (aged 24)	Ruislip Manor	1951	
Forwards
FW	Vernon Avis	(England)	24 October 1935 (aged 20)	Youth	1952	
FW	Billy Bloomfield	(England)	25 August 1939 (aged 16)	Youth	1956	
FW	Frank Dudley	(England)	9 May 1925 (aged 31)	Cardiff City	1953	
FW	George Francis	(England)	4 February 1934 (aged 22)	Youth	1955	
FW	Billy Goundry	(England)	28 March 1934 (aged 22)	Huddersfield Town	1955	
FW	Dennis Heath	(England)	28 September 1934 (aged 21)	Youth	1954	
FW	Len Newcombe	(Wales)	28 February 1931 (aged 25)	Fulham	1956	
FW	Eric Parsons	(England)	9 November 1923 (aged 32)	Chelsea	1956	
FW	John Pearson	(England)	23 April 1935 (aged 21)	Youth	1955	
FW	Johnny Rainford	(England)	11 December 1930 (aged 25)	Cardiff City	1953	
FW	Jeff Taylor	(England)	20 September 1930 (aged 25)	Fulham	1954	
FW	Jim Towers	(England)	15 April 1933 (aged 23)	Youth	1954	
Players who left the club mid-season
GK	Reg Newton	(England)	30 June 1926 (aged 30)	Leyton Orient	1949	Transferred to Tunbridge Wells United
DF	Sid Tickridge (c)	(England)	10 April 1923 (aged 33)	Chelsea	1955	Retired

- Sources: 100 Years Of Brentford, Timeless Bees

== Coaching staff ==
Name	Role
(England) Bill Dodgin Sr.	Manager
(England) Tom Egglestone	Trainer
(England) Jack Holliday	Assistant Trainer

== Statistics ==
=== Appearances and goals ===

Brentford's highest appearance-makers in each position during the Football League season.

Pos	Nat	Name	League		FA Cup		Total	
Pos	Nat	Name	Apps	Goals	Apps	Goals	Apps	Goals
GK	(England)	Gerry Cakebread	38	0	3	0	41	0
GK	(Republic of Ireland)	Sonny Feehan	3	0	0	0	3	0
GK	(England)	Reg Newton	5	0	0	0	5	0
DF	(England)	Alan Bassham	12	0	2	0	14	0
DF	(England)	Wally Bragg	33	1	1	0	34	1
DF	(England)	Ken Horne	5	0	0	0	5	0
DF	(England)	George Lowden	3	0	0	0	3	0
DF	(England)	Sid Russell	22	0	0	0	22	0
DF	(England)	Sid Tickridge	23	0	3	0	26	0
HB	(England)	George Bristow	16	1	0	0	16	1
HB	(England)	Ken Coote	44	1	3	0	47	1
HB	(England)	Ian Dargie	27	1	3	0	30	1
HB	(Wales)	Wendell Morgan	26	1	1	0	27	1
HB	(England)	Ron Peplow	14	1	3	0	17	1
HB	(England)	Terry Robinson	12	0	0	0	12	0
HB	(England)	Len Roe	2	0	0	0	2	0
FW	(England)	Vernon Avis	1	0	0	0	1	0
FW	(England)	Billy Bloomfield	1	0	0	0	1	0
FW	(England)	Frank Dudley	4	2	0	0	4	2
FW	(England)	George Francis	41	23	3	1	44	24
FW	(England)	Billy Goundry	31	6	2	0	33	6
FW	(England)	Dennis Heath	3	0	1	0	4	0
FW	(Wales)	Len Newcombe	43	3	3	0	46	3
FW	(England)	Eric Parsons	27	4	2	0	29	4
FW	(England)	John Pearson	1	0	0	0	1	0
FW	(England)	Johnny Rainford	7	1	0	0	7	1
FW	(England)	Jeff Taylor	38	15	2	2	40	17
FW	(England)	Jim Towers	24	12	1	1	25	13

- Players listed in italics left the club mid-season.
- Source: 100 Years Of Brentford

=== Goalscorers ===
Pos.	Nat	Player	FL3	FAC	Total
FW	(England)	George Francis	23	1	24
FW	(England)	Jeff Taylor	15	2	17
FW	(England)	Jim Towers	12	1	13
FW	(England)	Billy Goundry	6	0	6
FW	(England)	Eric Parsons	4	0	4
FW	(Wales)	Len Newcombe	3	0	3
FW	(England)	Frank Dudley	2	0	2
DF	(England)	Wally Bragg	1	0	1
HB	(England)	George Bristow	1	0	1
HB	(England)	Ken Coote	1	0	1
HB	(England)	Ian Dargie	1	0	1
HB	(Wales)	Wendell Morgan	1	0	1
HB	(England)	Ron Peplow	1	0	1
FW	(England)	Johnny Rainford	1	0	1
Opponents			5	2	7
Total			78	6	84

- Players listed in italics left the club mid-season.
- Source: 100 Years Of Brentford

=== Representative caps ===
Pos.	Nat	Player	Team	Caps	Goals	Ref
HB	(England)	Terry Robinson	Great Britain	8	0	

=== Management ===
Name	Nat	From	To	Record All Comps					Record League				
Name	Nat	From	To	P	W	D	L	W %	P	W	D	L	W %
Bill Dodgin Sr.	(England)	18 August 1956	1 May 1957	49	17	17	15	34.69	46	16	16	14	34.78

=== Summary ===
Games played	49 (46 Third Division South, 3 FA Cup)
Games won	17 (16 Third Division South, 1 FA Cup)
Games drawn	17 (16 Third Division South, 1 FA Cup)
Games lost	15 (14 Third Division South, 1 FA Cup)
Goals scored	84 (78 Third Division South, 6 FA Cup)
Goals conceded	80 (76 Third Division South, 4 FA Cup)
Clean sheets	10 (9 Third Division South, 1 FA Cup)
Biggest league win	5–0 versus Millwall, 4 March 1957
Worst league defeat	7–0 versus Walsall, 19 January 1957
Most appearances	47, Ken Coote (44 Third Division South, 3 FA Cup)
Top scorer (league)	23, George Francis
Top scorer (all competitions)	24, George Francis

== Transfers & loans ==
Players transferred in
Date	Pos.	Name	Previous club	Fee	Ref.
August 1956	DF	(England) Sid Russell	(England) Jolly X	Free	
November 1956	FW	(England) Eric Parsons	(England) Chelsea	n/a	
Players loaned in
Date from	Pos.	Name	From	Date to	Ref.
August 1956	FW	(Scotland) Tommy Henaughan	(Scotland) Kilmarnock	n/a	
Players transferred out
Date	Pos.	Name	Subsequent club	Fee	Ref.
February 1957	GK	(England) Reg Newton	(England) Tunbridge Wells Rangers	n/a	
Players released
Date	Pos.	Name	Subsequent club	Join date	Ref.
January 1957	DF	(England) Sid Tickridge	Retired		
May 1957	HB	(England) Wally Bragg	Retired		
