= 1955–56 Brentford F.C. season =

English football team season

Brentford
1955–56 season
- Chairman: Frank Davis
- Manager: Bill Dodgin Sr.
- Stadium: Griffin Park
- Third Division South: 6th
- FA Cup: Second round
- Top goalscorer: League: Towers (21); All: Towers (22)
- Highest home attendance: 17,847
- Lowest home attendance: 5,291
- Average home league attendance: 10,302
Home colours

During the 1955–56 English football season, Brentford competed in the Football League Third Division South. A promising 6th-place finish was achieved with a squad mainly drawn from the club's youth system.

== Season summary ==
After finishing the previous season strongly, Brentford went into the 1955–56 Third Division South season full of optimism. Youth products Jim Towers and Dennis Heath had established themselves in the first team, while George Francis and Gerry Cakebread had also made their debuts. Full backs Alan Bassham, George Lowden and half backs Wally Bragg and George Bristow also made up the ranks of home-grown players in the first team squad and forward John Pearson was another to graduate from the youth team during the 1955–56 season. Chelsea full back Sid Tickridge was manager Bill Dodgin Sr.'s only major signing of the off-season and he replaced Frank Latimer as club captain.

Despite winning more games than they had lost, Brentford hovered in mid-table during the opening three months of the season. Forward Jeff Taylor led the attack and scored 11 goals in as many matches during a five-week period in September and October 1955. Buoyed by four goals in five league matches by Wendell Morgan and news from the boardroom that a £9,000 profit had been made on the year ending in May 1955 (equivalent to £298,300 in 2023), the Bees moved as high as 8th-place in early December, before losing form again later in the month.

Victory over Exeter City on 4 February 1956 was the first win of a strong run which lasted for the remainder of the season and resulted in a 6th-place finish, 11 points behind the top-three clubs. During the season, 22-goal forward Jim Towers and goalkeeper Gerry Cakebread established themselves as two of the best players in the Third Division South. After nearly 27 years as a player, assistant manager and caretaker manager at Griffin Park, long-serving Jimmy Bain retired in May 1956. He received a Long Service Medal from the Football League in recognition and was awarded a testimonial match to be played in October 1956.

Brentford's 4–0 defeat at the hands of Millwall on 5 September 1955 ended an 11-match unbeaten run in League London derbies, a club record which stretched back to February 1954. The record was equalled in August 2023.

== League table ==
Pos	Team	Pld	W	D	L	GF	GA	GAv	Pts
4	Southend United	46	21	11	14	88	80	1.100	53
5	Torquay United	46	20	12	14	86	63	1.365	52
6	Brentford	46	19	14	13	69	66	1.045	52
7	Norwich City	46	19	13	14	86	82	1.049	51
8	Coventry City	46	20	9	17	73	60	1.217	49

== Results ==
Brentford's goal tally listed first.

=== Legend ===
Win	Draw	Loss

=== Football League Third Division South ===
No.	Date	Opponent	Venue	Result	Attendance	Scorer(s)
1	20 August 1955	Gillingham	H	1–4	12,247	Towers (pen)
2	22 August 1955	Queens Park Rangers	A	1–1	11,688	Stobbart
3	27 August 1955	Bournemouth & Boscombe Athletic	A	0–0	10,451	
4	30 August 1955	Queens Park Rangers	H	2–0	12,947	Towers, Taylor
5	3 September 1955	Norwich City	H	1–2	12,565	Dudley
6	5 September 1955	Millwall	A	0–4	6,911	
7	10 September 1955	Colchester United	A	3–0	7,843	Towers (2), Taylor
8	12 September 1955	Millwall	H	2–2	7,597	Taylor, Stobbart
9	17 September 1955	Leyton Orient	H	1–0	17,847	Taylor
10	19 September 1955	Watford	H	0–0	6,864	
11	24 September 1955	Exeter City	A	3–2	9,454	Taylor (3)
12	26 September 1955	Coventry City	A	1–2	12,584	Taylor
13	1 October 1955	Southend United	H	2–1	14,329	Taylor, Towers
14	8 October 1955	Aldershot	A	1–4	7,395	Towers
15	15 October 1955	Crystal Palace	H	3–0	13,636	Taylor (2), Towers
16	22 October 1955	Brighton & Hove Albion	A	0–3	12,771	
17	29 October 1955	Southampton	H	2–1	12,300	Morgan, Rainford
18	5 November 1955	Shrewsbury Town	A	1–1	10,551	Morgan
19	12 November 1955	Ipswich Town	H	3–2	14,795	Francis, Morgan, Towers
20	26 November 1955	Torquay United	H	1–3	11,547	Heath
21	3 December 1955	Newport County	A	2–1	8,035	Morgan, Dudley
22	17 December 1955	Gillingham	A	2–1	5,867	Francis, Bristow
23	24 December 1955	Bournemouth & Boscombe Athletic	H	2–1	8,592	Coote, Taylor
24	26 December 1955	Reading	H	2–2	12,556	Robertson, Rainford
25	27 December 1955	Reading	A	2–5	11,910	Bragg (pen), Francis
26	31 December 1955	Norwich City	A	0–1	18,542	
27	14 January 1956	Colchester United	H	2–2	8,492	Rainford, Taylor
28	21 January 1956	Leyton Orient	A	1–2	14,009	Morgan
29	4 February 1956	Exeter City	H	2–0	6,309	Francis (2)
30	11 February 1956	Southend United	A	2–2	5,124	Towers, Stirling (og)
31	18 February 1956	Aldershot	H	2–0	7,026	Towers (2)
32	25 February 1956	Crystal Palace	A	2–0	10,054	Towers (2)
33	3 March 1956	Brighton & Hove Albion	H	4–2	11,061	Robertson (2), Goundry, Francis
34	10 March 1956	Southampton	A	1–1	11,678	Towers
35	12 March 1956	Swindon Town	H	1–2	7,249	Towers
36	17 March 1956	Shrewsbury Town	H	1–1	9,156	Towers
37	24 March 1956	Ipswich Town	A	1–1	13,672	Towers
38	31 March 1956	Walsall	H	2–2	8,933	Towers, Coote
39	2 April 1956	Northampton Town	H	2–1	9,527	Towers (2)
40	3 April 1956	Northampton Town	A	0–1	8,248	
41	7 April 1956	Torquay United	A	1–3	5,574	Taylor
42	14 April 1956	Newport County	H	1–1	5,291	Towers
43	21 April 1956	Swindon Town	A	1–0	5,790	Peplow
44	23 April 1956	Coventry City	H	1–1	6,078	Bragg (pen)
45	28 April 1956	Watford	A	2–0	7,192	Robinson, Francis
46	3 May 1956	Walsall	A	2–1	9,033	Taylor, Newcombe

=== FA Cup ===
Round	Date	Opponent	Venue	Result	Attendance	Scorer(s)
1R	19 November 1955	March Town United	H	4–0	13,300	Stobbart (2), Towers (pen), Francis
2R	10 December 1955	Leyton Orient	A	1–4	17,490	Taylor

- Sources: 100 Years Of Brentford, Statto, 11v11

== Playing squad ==
Players' ages are as of the opening day of the 1955–56 season.

Pos.	Name	Nat.	Date of birth (age)	Signed from	Signed in	Notes
Goalkeepers						
GK	Gerry Cakebread	(England)	1 April 1936 (aged 19)	Youth	1954	
GK	Reg Newton	(England)	30 June 1926 (aged 29)	Leyton Orient	1949	
Defenders
DF	Alan Bassham	(England)	3 October 1933 (aged 21)	Youth	1953	
DF	Ken Horne	(England)	25 June 1926 (aged 29)	Blackpool	1950	
DF	George Lowden	(England)	2 March 1933 (aged 22)	Unattached	1951	
DF	Sid Tickridge (c)	(England)	10 April 1923 (aged 32)	Chelsea	1955	
Midfielders
HB	Wally Bragg	(England)	8 July 1929 (aged 26)	Twickenham Celtic	1946	
HB	George Bristow	(England)	25 June 1933 (aged 22)	Youth	1950	
HB	Ken Coote	(England)	19 May 1928 (aged 27)	Wembley	1949	
HB	Ian Dargie	(England)	3 October 1931 (aged 23)	Tonbridge	1952	
HB	Leonard Geard	(England)	12 February 1934 (aged 21)	Fulham	1953	
HB	Frank Latimer	(England)	3 October 1923 (aged 31)	Snowdown Colliery Welfare	1945	
HB	Johnny Rainford	(England)	11 December 1930 (aged 24)	Cardiff City	1953	
HB	Terry Robinson	(England)	8 November 1929 (aged 25)	Loughborough College	1954	Amateur
HB	Len Roe	(England)	11 January 1932 (aged 23)	Ruislip Manor	1951	
Forwards
FW	Frank Dudley	(England)	9 May 1925 (aged 30)	Cardiff City	1953	
FW	George Francis	(England)	4 February 1934 (aged 21)	Youth	1955	
FW	Billy Goundry	(England)	28 March 1934 (aged 21)	Huddersfield Town	1955	
FW	Dennis Heath	(England)	28 September 1934 (aged 20)	Youth	1954	
FW	Wendell Morgan	(Wales)	22 April 1935 (aged 20)	Cardiff City	1954	
FW	Len Newcombe	(Wales)	28 February 1931 (aged 24)	Fulham	1956	
FW	John Pearson	(England)	23 April 1935 (aged 20)	Youth	1955	
FW	Ron Peplow	(England)	4 May 1935 (aged 20)	Southall	1955	
FW	James Robertson	(Scotland)	20 February 1929 (aged 26)	Arsenal	1953	
FW	Billy Sperrin	(England)	9 April 1922 (aged 33)	Guildford City	1949	
FW	George Stobbart	(England)	9 January 1921 (aged 34)	Millwall	1954	
FW	Jeff Taylor	(England)	20 September 1930 (aged 24)	Fulham	1954	
FW	Jim Towers	(England)	15 April 1933 (aged 22)	Youth	1954	

- Sources: 100 Years Of Brentford, Timeless Bees

== Coaching staff ==
Name	Role
(England) Bill Dodgin Sr.	Manager
(Scotland) Jimmy Bain	Assistant manager
(England) Tommy Eggleston	Trainer
(England) Jack Holliday	Assistant trainer

== Statistics ==
=== Appearances and goals ===

Brentford's highest appearance-makers in each position during the Football League season.

Pos	Nat	Name	League		FA Cup		Total	
Pos	Nat	Name	Apps	Goals	Apps	Goals	Apps	Goals
GK	(England)	Gerry Cakebread	45	0	2	0	47	0
GK	(England)	Reg Newton	1	0	0	0	1	0
DF	(England)	Alan Bassham	10	0	0	0	10	0
DF	(England)	Ken Horne	7	0	0	0	7	0
DF	(England)	George Lowden	15	0	0	0	15	0
DF	(England)	Sid Tickridge	39	0	2	0	41	0
HB	(England)	Wally Bragg	29	2	0	0	29	2
HB	(England)	George Bristow	27	1	1	0	28	1
HB	(England)	Ken Coote	45	2	2	0	47	2
HB	(England)	Ian Dargie	4	0	0	0	4	0
HB	(England)	Leonard Geard	3	0	0	0	3	0
HB	(England)	Frank Latimer	10	0	1	0	11	0
HB	(England)	Johnny Rainford	37	3	2	0	39	3
HB	(England)	Terry Robinson	15	1	2	0	17	1
HB	(England)	Len Roe	4	0	1	0	5	0
FW	(England)	Frank Dudley	14	2	1	0	15	2
FW	(England)	George Francis	17	7	1	1	18	8
FW	(England)	Billy Goundry	23	1	0	0	23	1
FW	(England)	Dennis Heath	17	1	1	0	18	1
FW	(Wales)	Wendell Morgan	16	5	1	0	17	5
FW	(Wales)	Len Newcombe	3	1	—		3	1
FW	(England)	John Pearson	4	0	0	0	4	0
FW	(England)	Ron Peplow	3	1	0	0	3	1
FW	(Scotland)	James Robertson	22	3	0	0	22	3
FW	(England)	Billy Sperrin	2	0	0	0	2	0
FW	(England)	George Stobbart	12	2	1	2	13	4
FW	(England)	Jeff Taylor	43	15	2	1	45	16
FW	(England)	Jim Towers	39	21	2	1	41	22

- Players listed in italics left the club mid-season.
- Source: 100 Years Of Brentford

=== Goalscorers ===
Pos.	Nat	Player	FL3	FAC	Total
FW	(England)	Jim Towers	21	1	22
FW	(England)	Jeff Taylor	15	1	16
FW	(England)	George Francis	7	1	8
FW	(Wales)	Wendell Morgan	5	0	5
FW	(England)	George Stobbart	2	2	4
HB	(England)	Johnny Rainford	3	0	3
FW	(Scotland)	James Robertson	3	0	3
HB	(England)	Wally Bragg	2	0	2
HB	(England)	Ken Coote	2	0	2
FW	(England)	Frank Dudley	2	0	2
FW	(Wales)	Len Newcombe	1	—	1
HB	(England)	George Bristow	1	0	1
FW	(England)	Billy Goundry	1	0	1
FW	(England)	Dennis Heath	1	0	1
FW	(England)	Ron Peplow	1	0	1
HB	(England)	Terry Robinson	1	0	1
Opponents			1	0	1
Total			69	5	74

- Players listed in italics left the club mid-season.
- Source: 100 Years Of Brentford

=== Amateur international caps ===
Pos.	Nat	Player	Caps	Goals	Ref
HB	(England)	Terry Robinson	2	0	

=== Management ===
Name	Nat	From	To	Record All Comps					Record League				
Name	Nat	From	To	P	W	D	L	W %	P	W	D	L	W %
Bill Dodgin Sr.	(England)	20 August 1955	3 May 1956	48	20	14	14	41.67	46	19	14	13	41.30

=== Summary ===
Games played	48 (46 Third Division South, 2 FA Cup)
Games won	20 (19 Third Division South, 1 FA Cup)
Games drawn	14 (14 Third Division South, 0 FA Cup)
Games lost	14 (13 Third Division South, 1 FA Cup)
Goals scored	74 (69 Third Division South, 5 FA Cup)
Goals conceded	70 (66 Third Division South, 4 FA Cup)
Clean sheets	12 (11 Third Division South, 1 FA Cup)
Biggest league win	3–0 on two occasions
Worst league defeat	4–0 versus Millwall, 5 September 1955
Most appearances	47, Gerry Cakebread, Ken Coote (45 Third Division South, 2 FA Cup)
Top scorer (league)	21, Jim Towers
Top scorer (all competitions)	22, Jim Towers

== Transfers & loans ==
Players transferred in
Date	Pos.	Name	Previous club	Fee	Ref.
May 1955	FW	(England) Billy Goundry	(England) Huddersfield Town	Free	
July 1955	DF	(England) Sid Tickridge	(England) Chelsea	n/a	
August 1955	FW	(Wales) Ken Morgan	(England) Northampton Town	n/a	
August 1955	FW	(England) Ron Peplow	(England) Southall	n/a	
April 1956	FW	(Wales) Len Newcombe	(England) Fulham	n/a	
Players transferred out
Date	Pos.	Name	Subsequent club	Fee	Ref.
October 1955	FW	(Wales) Ken Morgan	(England) Crystal Palace	n/a	
April 1956	DF	(England) Ken Moffitt	(Scotland) Berwick Rangers	n/a	
Players released
Date	Pos.	Name	Subsequent club	Join date	Ref.
May 1956	HB	(England) Leonard Geard	(England) Kettering Town	August 1956	
May 1956	HB	(England) Frank Latimer	(England) Gravesend & Northfleet	July 1956	
May 1956	FW	(Scotland) James Robertson	(England) Gravesend & Northfleet	July 1956	
May 1956	FW	(England) Billy Sperrin	(England) Tunbridge Wells United	1956	
May 1956	FW	(England) George Stobbart	(England) Bedford Town	1956	
