= 1954–55 Brentford F.C. season =

English football team season

Brentford
1954–55 season
- Chairman: Frank Davis
- Manager: Bill Dodgin Sr.
- Stadium: Griffin Park
- Third Division South: 11th
- FA Cup: Fourth round
- Top goalscorer: League: Dudley (18); All: Dudley (20)
- Highest home attendance: 18,756
- Lowest home attendance: 4,960
- Average home league attendance: 11,077
Home colours

During the 1954–55 English football season, Brentford competed in the Football League Third Division South. In the club's first season back in the third-tier since 1932–33, the Bees finished in mid-table. The season was memorable for the debuts of youth products Jim Towers and George Francis, who went on to dominate Brentford's goalscoring charts until 1961.

== Season summary ==
The 1954–55 Third Division South season marked Brentford's fall from the top-flight to the basement in just seven years. It was the Bees' first Third Division South season since 1932–33 and though he had a limited budget, manager Bill Dodgin Sr. did not conduct a fire sale and managed to keep his squad intact. Forwards George Stobbart, Jeff Taylor and goalkeeper Sonny Feehan were the only players to arrive at Griffin Park. Ageing full back Fred Monk was released, goalkeeper Alf Jefferies transferred to Torquay United and the £10,000 fee from the sale of Jimmy Bloomfield to Arsenal was spent on relieving the club's debts. The products of Alf Bew's youth team were to be given more of a chance than in the previous Second Division seasons.

Brentford drew four of the first six matches of the season and Bees slowly pulled away from the relegation places, before moving into the top 10 after three wins in a four match spell in late September 1954. An uneven period followed through to February 1955, with the club drifting slowly towards the re-election places (the £10,000 sale of forward Billy Dare to West Ham United was offset by the emergence of youth product Jim Towers), before rising back to an 11th-place finish after just three defeats in the final 18 matches of the season. Frank Dudley (20, George Stobbart (19) and Jim Towers (16) led the club's goalscoring chart, but while 82 league goals were scored, 82 were also conceded, which was amongst the highest in the Third Division South.

The FA Cup proved to be an entertaining distraction, with Brentford entering at the first round stage for the first time since the 1932–33 season. Non-League clubs Nuneaton Borough and Crook Town were beaten in the first two rounds and it took two replays to get past Bradford City in the third. The Bees fell to Newcastle United at St James' Park in the fourth round, but they gave their First Division hosts a scare with goals from George Stobbart and Johnny Rainford in the 3–2 defeat.

A number of club records were set or equalled during the season:

- Most home league goals conceded in a season: 36
- Highest away league aggregate score: 10 (4–6 versus Southampton, 21 August 1954)
- Most league games without a clean sheet: 20 (25 September 1954 – 19 February 1955)
- Quickest league goalscorer: 10 seconds – George Stobbart (versus Aldershot, 6 November 1954)^{[19]}

== League table ==
Pos	Team	Pld	W	D	L	GF	GA	GAv	Pts
9	Coventry City	46	18	11	17	67	59	1.136	47
10	Southend United	46	17	12	17	83	80	1.038	46
11	Brentford	46	16	14	16	82	82	1.000	46
12	Norwich City	46	18	10	18	60	60	1.000	46
13	Northampton Town	46	19	8	19	73	81	0.901	46

Source: rsssf.com

== Results ==
Brentford's goal tally listed first.

=== Legend ===
Win	Draw	Loss

=== Friendlies ===
Date	Opponent	Venue	Result	Attendance	Scorer(s)
5 October 1954	Chelsea	H	4–0	11,300	
19 October 1954	Dundee	H	4–1	n/a	n/a
November 1954	Scotland	H	0–2	0	
29 March 1955	England Amateur XI	H	2–1	11,000	Studley (2)

=== Football League Third Division South ===
No.	Date	Opponent	Venue	Result	Attendance	Scorer(s)
1	21 August 1954	Southampton	A	4–6	21,454	Robertson (2), Dudley, Stobbart
2	26 August 1954	Shrewsbury Town	H	2–2	12,743	Dudley, Maloney (og)
3	28 August 1954	Coventry City	H	2–3	13,057	Stobbart, McDonnell (og)
4	30 August 1954	Shrewsbury Town	A	2–2	8,352	Stobbart, Towers
5	4 September 1954	Queens Park Rangers	H	1–1	18,756	Heath
6	8 September 1954	Reading	A	0–0	9,692	
7	11 September 1954	Brighton & Hove Albion	A	4–3	17,361	Towers, Heath, Robertson, Dudley
8	16 September 1954	Reading	H	2–2	9,639	Dudley, Stobbart
9	18 September 1954	Torquay United	H	4–2	13,552	Towers, Heath, Stobbart, Webber (og)
10	23 September 1954	Gillingham	H	3–0	9,241	Dudley (2), Heath
11	25 September 1954	Bristol City	A	1–2	28,980	Dudley
12	29 September 1954	Gillingham	A	1–2	8,202	Towers
13	2 October 1954	Walsall	H	0–2	12,584	
14	9 October 1954	Exeter City	A	2–3	9,700	Robertson, Rainford
15	16 October 1954	Colchester United	H	3–2	10,218	Robertson, Stobbart, Rainford
16	23 October 1954	Norwich City	A	0–1	20,148	
17	30 October 1954	Bournemouth & Boscombe Athletic	H	1–3	12,037	Towers
18	6 November 1954	Aldershot	A	3–2	7,178	Stobbart, Towers, Heath
19	13 November 1954	Swindon Town	H	4–2	10,634	Stobbart (2), Heath, Towers
20	27 November 1954	Northampton Town	H	1–3	10,029	Croy (og)
21	4 December 1954	Watford	A	2–2	10,438	Towers (2)
22	18 December 1954	Southampton	H	0–3	9,318	
23	25 December 1954	Millwall	H	3–1	13,591	Stobbart (2), Towers
24	27 December 1954	Millwall	A	2–2	20,034	Anslow (og), Hurley (og)
25	1 January 1955	Coventry City	A	0–1	14,481	
26	15 January 1955	Queens Park Rangers	A	1–1	9,835	Dudley
27	22 January 1955	Brighton & Hove Albion	H	2–3	10,173	Stobbart, Bristow
28	5 February 1955	Torquay United	A	2–4	6,117	Dudley, Sperrin
29	12 February 1955	Bristol City	H	2–2	11,563	Rainford, Robertson
30	19 February 1955	Walsall	A	2–2	9,028	Robertson, Francis
31	26 February 1955	Exeter City	H	1–0	7,454	Stobbart
32	5 March 1955	Colchester United	A	2–3	8,254	Francis, Dudley
33	12 March 1955	Norwich City	H	1–0	11,155	Stobbart
34	19 March 1955	Bournemouth & Boscombe Athletic	A	2–1	8,241	Coote, Taylor
35	26 March 1955	Aldershot	H	1–1	8,755	Taylor
36	2 April 1955	Swindon Town	A	1–1	5,924	Taylor
37	8 April 1955	Leyton Orient	H	2–0	18,093	Dudley, Towers (pen)
38	9 April 1955	Crystal Palace	H	3–0	12,013	Towers, Dudley (2)
39	11 April 1955	Leyton Orient	A	1–0	9,529	Dudley
40	16 April 1955	Northampton Town	A	2–1	6,980	Taylor, Towers
41	21 April 1955	Newport County	A	1–3	7,926	Rainford
42	23 April 1955	Watford	H	3–2	9,394	Dudley, Towers (2, 1 pen)
43	27 April 1955	Crystal Palace	A	1–1	8,170	Andrews (og)
44	30 April 1955	Southend United	A	2–3	6,464	Dudley (2)
45	2 May 1955	Newport County	H	1–0	4,960	Stobbart
46	5 May 1955	Southend United	H	2–2	5,812	Heath, Dudley

=== FA Cup ===
Round	Date	Opponent	Venue	Result	Attendance	Scorer(s)	Notes
1R	20 November 1954	Nuneaton Borough	H	2–1	13,180	Dare, Stobbart	
2R	11 December 1954	Crook Town	H	4–1	14,300	Rainford, Stobbart (2), Towers	
3R	8 January 1955	Bradford City	H	1–1	12,120	Dudley	
3R (replay)	12 January 1955	Bradford City	A	2–2 (a.e.t.)	7,963	Dare, Dudley	
3R (2nd replay)	20 January 1955	Bradford City	N	1–0	5,961	Dare	(Note: Match played at Arsenal Stadium, London.)
4R	29 January 1955	Newcastle United	A	2–3	46,574	Stobbart, Rainford	

- Sources: 100 Years Of Brentford, Statto, 11v11

== Playing squad ==
Players' ages are as of the opening day of the 1954–55 season.

Pos.	Name	Nat.	Date of birth (age)	Signed from	Signed in	Notes
Goalkeepers						
GK	Gerry Cakebread	(England)	1 April 1936 (aged 18)	Youth	1954	Amateur
GK	Sonny Feehan	(Republic of Ireland)	17 September 1926 (aged 27)	Northampton Town	1954	
GK	Reg Newton	(England)	30 June 1926 (aged 28)	Leyton Orient	1949	
Defenders						
DF	Alan Bassham	(England)	3 October 1933 (aged 20)	Youth	1953	
DF	Ken Coote	(England)	19 May 1928 (aged 26)	Wembley	1949	
DF	Ken Horne	(England)	25 June 1926 (aged 28)	Blackpool	1950	
DF	George Lowden	(England)	2 March 1933 (aged 21)	Unattached	1951	
Midfielders						
HB	Wally Bragg	(England)	8 July 1929 (aged 25)	Twickenham Celtic	1946	
HB	George Bristow	(England)	25 June 1933 (aged 21)	Youth	1950	
HB	Ian Dargie	(England)	3 October 1931 (aged 22)	Tonbridge	1952	
HB	Leonard Geard	(England)	12 February 1934 (aged 20)	Fulham	1953	
HB	Tony Harper	(England)	26 May 1925 (aged 29)	Headington United	1948	
HB	Roy Hart	(England)	30 May 1933 (aged 21)	Youth	1955	
HB	Frank Latimer (c)	(England)	3 October 1923 (aged 30)	Snowdown Colliery Welfare	1945	
HB	Terry Robinson	(England)	8 November 1929 (aged 24)	Loughborough College	1954	Amateur
Forwards						
FW	Frank Dudley	(England)	9 May 1925 (aged 29)	Cardiff City	1953	
FW	George Francis	(England)	4 February 1934 (aged 20)	Youth	1955	
FW	Dennis Heath	(England)	28 September 1934 (aged 19)	Youth	1954	
FW	Johnny Rainford	(England)	11 December 1930 (aged 23)	Cardiff City	1953	
FW	James Robertson	(Scotland)	20 February 1929 (aged 25)	Arsenal	1953	
FW	Len Roe	(England)	11 January 1932 (aged 22)	Ruislip Manor	1951	
FW	Billy Sperrin	(England)	9 April 1922 (aged 32)	Guildford City	1949	
FW	George Stobbart	(England)	9 January 1921 (aged 33)	Millwall	1954	
FW	Jeff Taylor	(England)	20 September 1930 (aged 23)	Fulham	1954	
FW	Jim Towers	(England)	15 April 1933 (aged 21)	Youth	1954	
Players who left the club mid-season
FW	Billy Dare	(England)	14 February 1927 (aged 27)	Hendon	1948	Transferred to West Ham United

- Sources: 100 Years Of Brentford, Timeless Bees

== Coaching staff ==
Name	Role
(England) Bill Dodgin Sr.	Manager
(Scotland) Jimmy Bain	Assistant Manager
(England) Tommy Eggleston	Trainer

== Statistics ==
=== Appearances and goals ===

Brentford's highest appearance-makers in each position during the Football League season.

Pos	Nat	Name	League		FA Cup		Total	
Pos	Nat	Name	Apps	Goals	Apps	Goals	Apps	Goals
GK	(England)	Gerry Cakebread	3	0	0	0	3	0
GK	(Republic of Ireland)	Sonny Feehan	25	0	6	0	31	0
GK	(England)	Reg Newton	18	0	0	0	18	0
DF	(England)	Alan Bassham	17	0	0	0	17	0
DF	(England)	Ken Coote	37	1	6	0	43	1
DF	(England)	Ken Horne	35	0	6	0	41	0
DF	(England)	George Lowden	10	0	0	0	10	0
HB	(England)	Wally Bragg	9	0	0	0	9	0
HB	(England)	George Bristow	30	1	5	0	35	1
HB	(England)	Ian Dargie	20	0	2	0	22	0
HB	(England)	Leonard Geard	1	0	0	0	1	0
HB	(England)	Tony Harper	26	0	5	0	31	0
HB	(England)	Roy Hart	2	0	0	0	2	0
HB	(England)	Frank Latimer	28	0	5	0	33	0
HB	(England)	Terry Robinson	8	0	1	0	9	0
FW	(England)	Billy Dare	8	0	3	3	11	3
FW	(England)	Frank Dudley	34	18	4	2	38	20
FW	(England)	George Francis	3	2	0	0	3	2
FW	(England)	Dennis Heath	35	7	4	0	39	7
FW	(England)	Johnny Rainford	33	4	6	2	39	6
FW	(Scotland)	James Robertson	31	7	1	0	32	7
FW	(England)	Len Roe	1	0	0	0	1	0
FW	(England)	Billy Sperrin	3	1	0	0	3	1
FW	(England)	George Stobbart	45	15	6	4	51	19
FW	(England)	Jeff Taylor	13	4	0	0	13	4
FW	(England)	Jim Towers	31	15	6	1	37	16

- Players listed in italics left the club mid-season.
- Source: 100 Years Of Brentford

=== Goalscorers ===
Pos.	Nat	Player	FL3	FAC	Total
FW	(England)	Frank Dudley	18	2	20
FW	(England)	George Stobbart	15	4	19
FW	(England)	Jim Towers	15	1	16
FW	(England)	Dennis Heath	7	0	7
FW	(Scotland)	James Robertson	7	0	7
FW	(England)	Johnny Rainford	4	2	6
FW	(England)	Jeff Taylor	4	0	4
FW	(England)	Billy Dare	0	3	3
FW	(England)	George Francis	2	0	2
HB	(England)	George Bristow	1	0	1
DF	(England)	Ken Coote	1	0	1
FW	(England)	Billy Sperrin	1	0	1
Opponents			7	0	7
Total			82	12	94

- Players listed in italics left the club mid-season.
- Source: 100 Years Of Brentford

=== Representative appearances ===
Pos.	Nat	Player	Team	Caps	Goals	Ref
HB	(England)	Johnny Rainford	Third Division South	1	1	

=== Management ===
Name	Nat	From	To	Record All Comps					Record League				
Name	Nat	From	To	P	W	D	L	W %	P	W	D	L	W %
Bill Dodgin Sr.	(England)	21 August 1954	5 May 1955	52	19	16	17	36.54	46	16	14	16	34.78

=== Summary ===
Games played	52 (46 Third Division South, 6 FA Cup)
Games won	19 (16 Third Division South, 3 FA Cup)
Games drawn	16 (14 Third Division South, 2 FA Cup)
Games lost	17 (16 Third Division South, 1 FA Cup)
Goals scored	94 (82 Third Division South, 12 FA Cup)
Goals conceded	90 (82 Third Division South, 8 FA Cup)
Clean sheets	9 (8 Third Division South, 1 FA Cup)
Biggest league win	3–0 on two occasions
Worst league defeat	3–0 versus Southampton, 18 December 1954
Most appearances	51, George Stobbart (45 Third Division South, 6 FA Cup)
Top scorer (league)	18, Frank Dudley
Top scorer (all competitions)	20, Frank Dudley

== Transfers & loans ==
Players transferred in
Date	Pos.	Name	Previous club	Fee	Ref.
May 1954	FW	(England) George Stobbart	(England) Millwall	Exchange	
June 1954	FW	(Wales) Wendell Morgan	(Wales) Cardiff City	Free	
August 1954	GK	(Republic of Ireland) Sonny Feehan	(England) Northampton Town	Free	
August 1954	FW	(England) Jeff Taylor	(England) Fulham	n/a	
September 1954	HB	(England) Terry Robinson	(England) Loughborough College	Amateur	
Players transferred out
Date	Pos.	Name	Subsequent club	Fee	Ref.
May 1954	FW	(England) Terry Ledgerton	(England) Millwall	Exchange	
June 1954	GK	(England) Alf Jefferies	(England) Torquay United	n/a	
July 1954	FW	(England) Jimmy Bloomfield	(England) Arsenal	£10,000	
January 1955	FW	(England) Billy Dare	(England) West Ham United	£10,000	
Players released
Date	Pos.	Name	Subsequent club	Join date	Ref.
May 1955	HB	(England) Tony Harper	(England) Headington United	1955	
May 1955	HB	(England) Roy Hart	n/a	n/a	
May 1955	DF	(England) Ken Moffitt	(Scotland) Berwick Rangers	1955	
