= Terry Robinson (footballer) =

English footballer (born 1929)

Personal information
- Full name: Terrence Hogarth Robinson
- Date of birth: 8 November 1929
- Place of birth: Woodhams, England
- Position: Centre half

Senior career*
Years	Team	Apps	(Gls)
	Blackpool	0	(0)
–1954	Loughborough College		
1954–1957	Brentford	35	(1)
1957–1958	Northampton Town	13	(0)
1958–1959	Hendon	4	(0)

International career
1956–1957	England Amateurs	10	(0)
1956	Great Britain	7	(0)
- * Club domestic league appearances and goals

Terrence Hogarth Robinson (born 8 November 1929) is an English retired amateur footballer who played in the Football League for Brentford, Blackpool and Northampton Town as a centre half. At international level, he represented England Amateurs and was a member of the Great Britain squad at the 1956 Summer Olympics.

== Club career ==
Robinson began his career at First Division club Blackpool and later played for Loughborough College, leaving in 1954. Robinson joined Third Division South club Brentford in 1954 and made his debut in a 1–0 defeat to Norwich City on 23 October 1954. He failed to establish himself in the first team, with his best tally being 17 appearances during the 1955–56 season. Robinson departed the Bees in 1957, having made 38 appearances and scored one goal in three years at Griffin Park. Robinson closed out his short career with Third Division South club Northampton Town and Athenian League club Hendon.

== International career ==
Robinson won 10 caps for the England amateur football team. He was a member of the Great Britain squad at the 1956 Summer Olympics, but did not make an appearance in the tournament, and only played in pre and post-tournament friendly matches.

== Personal life ==
Robinson worked as a schoolmaster and held a position at Greenford Grammar School while playing for Brentford. Robinson became physical education organiser for Birmingham schools in 1959.

== Career statistics ==
Appearances and goals by club, season and competition
Club	Season	League			FA Cup		Other		Total	
Club	Season	Division	Apps	Goals	Apps	Goals	Apps	Goals	Apps	Goals
Brentford	1954–55	Third Division South	8	0	1	0	—		9	0
Brentford	1955–56	Third Division South	15	1	2	0	—		17	1
Brentford	1956–57	Third Division South	12	0	0	0	—		12	0
Brentford	Total		35	1	3	0	—		38	1
Northampton Town	1957–58	Third Division South	13	0	1	0	—		14	0
Hendon	1958–59	Athenian League	4	0	—		3 (Note: 2 appearances in FA Amateur Cup, 1 appearance in London Senior Cup)	0	7	0
Career total			52	1	4	0	3	0	59	1
