= George Bristow (footballer) =

Footballer

Personal information
- Full name: George Andrew Bristow
- Date of birth: 25 June 1933
- Place of birth: Chiswick, England
- Date of death: 3 January 2010 (aged 76)
- Place of death: Wiltshire, England
- Position: Right half

Senior career*
Years	Team	Apps	(Gls)
1950–1961	Brentford	245	(8)
- → Blandford United (guest)
1961–1962	Queens Park Rangers	0	(0)
- Yiewsley
- * Club domestic league appearances and goals

George Andrew Bristow (25 June 1933 – 3 January 2010) was an English professional footballer who played as a right half in the Football League for Brentford. He made over 260 appearances in all competitions and was posthumously inducted into the Brentford Hall of Fame in May 2015.

== Career ==
=== Brentford ===
A right half, Bristow joined Brentford at a young age and came through the youth ranks to make his debut at the age of 17 in a 4–0 Second Division defeat to Manchester City on 14 October 1950. During his National Service, Bristow turned down a move to follow former teammate Peter Broadbent to First Division club Wolverhampton Wanderers. After completing his National Service and a period as a guest with Dorset League club Blandford United, it wasn't until the 1953–54 season that Bristow was able to hold down a regular first team place and he made 27 appearances in a campaign which saw the Bees relegated to the Third Division South. In February 1956, Bristow was awarded a testimonial versus an International Managers XI and was the club's youngest player to be granted the honour.

Bristow's best years at Brentford came in the 1957–58 and 1958–59 seasons and he made over 40 appearances in each. Injuries took their toll on Bristow and he departed the club at the end of the 1960–61 season, after making 264 appearances for the club and scoring eight goals. He was posthumously inducted into the Brentford Hall of Fame in May 2015.

=== Queens Park Rangers ===
Bristow and Brentford teammates Jim Towers and George Francis joined Brentford's West London rivals Queens Park Rangers during the 1961 off-season. He suffered an achilles injury during a pre-season match, which ended his professional career. Bristow failed to appear for the first team and left the club at the end of the 1961–62 Third Division season.

=== Yiewsley ===
After his release from Queens Park Rangers, Bristow dropped into non-League football and joined Southern League First Division club Yiewsley in 1962.

== Personal life ==
Bristow undertook his National Service as a PT instructor at Blandford Camp and represented his battalion's football team. He was married to Maureen and had two daughters. After his retirement from football, Bristow worked as a driving instructor, at Heathrow Airport and as of April 1995, he had worked as a self-employed bricklayer for the previous 25 years. He died in January 2010, after suffering with Parkinson's and Alzheimer's diseases.

== Career statistics ==
Appearances and goals by club, season and competition
Club	Season	League			FA Cup		League Cup		Total	
Club	Season	Division	Apps	Goals	Apps	Goals	Apps	Goals	Apps	Goals
Brentford	1950–51	Second Division	5	0	0	0	—		5	0
Brentford	1951–52	Second Division	2	0	0	0	—		2	0
Brentford	1952–53	Second Division	5	0	0	0	—		5	0
Brentford	1953–54	Second Division	24	0	3	0	—		27	0
Brentford	1954–55	Third Division South	30	1	5	0	—		35	1
Brentford	1955–56	Third Division South	27	1	1	0	—		28	1
Brentford	1956–57	Third Division South	16	1	0	0	—		16	1
Brentford	1957–58	Third Division South	41	0	1	0	—		42	0
Brentford	1958–59	Third Division	37	1	4	0	—		41	1
Brentford	1959–60	Third Division	35	2	2	0	—		37	2
Brentford	1960–61	Third Division	23	2	2	0	1	0	26	2
Career total			245	8	18	0	1	0	264	8

== Honours ==
- Brentford Hall of Fame
