= Anslow (surname) =

Anslow is a surname. Notable people with the name include the following:

- Gladys Anslow (1892–1969), American physicist
- Hub Anslow (1926–2006), Canadian ice hockey left winger
- Stan Anslow (1931–2017), English footballer

== See also ==
- Tonman Mosley, 1st Baron Anslow (1850–1933), British businessman, judge and politician
