= John Beale =

John Beale may refer to:

- John Beale (footballer) (1930–1995), English footballer
- John Beale (writer) (c. 1608–1683), English clergyman, scientific writer and Fellow of the Royal Society
- John Elmes Beale (1847–1928), English politician and merchant
- Alan John Beale (1923–2005), commonly known as John Beale, British medical scientist
- John C. Beale (born 1948), American EPA fraudster

== See also ==
- Jack Beale (1917–2006), Australian politician
- John Beal (disambiguation)
- John Beall (disambiguation)
