= Ron Peplow =

English footballer (1935–2019)

Personal information
- Full name: Ronald Rupert Peplow
- Date of birth: 4 May 1935
- Place of birth: Willesden, England
- Date of death: 15 March 2019 (aged 83)
- Positions: Wing half; inside forward

Senior career*
Years	Team	Apps	(Gls)
1954–1955	Southall		
1955–1961	Brentford	61	(5)
- Folkestone Town
1961–1962	Ashford Town	31	(6)
- * Club domestic league appearances and goals

Ronald Rupert Peplow (4 May 1935 – 15 March 2019) was an English professional footballer who played in the Football League for Brentford as a wing half. He also played non-League football for Southall, Folkestone Town and Ashford Town. Peplow was a penalty specialist and scored 28 goals from 30 attempts during his career.

== Club career ==
=== Brentford ===
Peplow began his career as an inside forward at Athenian League club Southall and caught the attention of Third Division South neighbours Brentford during the 1954–55 season. He signed for the Bees in August 1955 and made his professional debut almost a year later in a 1–0 win over Swindon Town on 21 April 1956. Utilised mainly as a wing half, Peplow made something of a breakthrough into the first team during the 1956–57 season and made 17 appearances. He was transfer-listed as his own request in September 1958, but a move did not materialise and his appearance rate reduced season-by-season until 1960–61, when he made 18 appearances and scored three goals. He was released in June 1961, having made 66 appearances and scored five goals in six years at Griffin Park.

=== Non-League football ===
After his release from Brentford, Peplow dropped back into non-League football and had spells with Southern League clubs Folkestone Town and Ashford Town.

== Representative career ==
While a schoolboy, Peplow represented the Middlesex and London schoolboy teams.

== Career statistics ==
Appearances and goals by club, season and competition
Club	Season	League			FA Cup		League Cup		Other		Total	
Club	Season	Division	Apps	Goals	Apps	Goals	Apps	Goals	Apps	Goals	Apps	Goals
Brentford	1955–56	Third Division South	3	1	0	0	—		—		3	1
Brentford	1956–57	Third Division South	14	1	3	0	—		—		17	1
Brentford	1957–58	Third Division South	12	0	1	0	—		—		13	0
Brentford	1958–59	Third Division	7	0	0	0	—		—		7	0
Brentford	1959–60	Third Division	8	0	0	0	—		—		8	0
Brentford	1960–61	Third Division	17	3	0	0	1	0	—		18	3
Brentford	Total		61	5	4	0	1	0	—		66	5
Ashford Town	1961–62	Southern League First Division	31	6	2	0	—		10 (Note: 4 appearances in Southern League Cup, 3 appearances in Kent Senior Cup, 3 appearances in Kent Floodlight Cup)	0	43	6
Career total			92	11	6	0	1	0	10	0	109	11

== Honours ==
Ashford Town

- Kent Senior Cup: 1962–63 (drawn)
- Kent Floodlight Cup: 1962–63
