= Wally Bragg =

English footballer

Personal information
- Full name: Walter Leonard Bragg
- Date of birth: 8 July 1929
- Place of birth: Twickenham, England
- Date of death: 6 March 2016 (aged 86)
- Place of death: Twickenham, England
- Position: Centre half

Youth career
- Twickenham Celtic

Senior career*
Years	Team	Apps	(Gls)
1946–1957	Brentford	161	(6)
1946–1947	→ Hounslow Town (loan)		
- * Club domestic league appearances and goals

Walter Leonard Bragg (8 July 1929 – 6 March 2016) was an English professional footballer who played as a centre half in the Football League for Brentford. At the time of his debut in March 1947, he was Brentford's then-youngest first team debutant.

== Career ==
An amateur centre half, Bragg joined First Division club Brentford in early 1946 from local team Twickenham Celtic. After a spell out on loan at Corinthian League club Hounslow Town, he turned professional in January 1947. He made his debut at outside right, in place of Idris Hopkins for the visit of Grimsby Town on 29 March 1947 and his appearance in the 1–0 defeat made him Brentford's youngest debutant at that time. A call-up for national service saw him fail to appear again until the second half of the 1951–52 Second Division season, when he enjoyed a run of 10 appearances. He then went on to become a regular fixture in the team through the mid-1950s and made a career-high 44 appearances during a disastrous 1953–54 season, in which the Bees were relegated to the Third Division South. Bragg played on until the end of the 1956–57 season, when he retired from football after a succession of injuries. He was posthumously inducted into the club's Hall of Fame in May 2018.

== Personal life ==
Prior to becoming a professional footballer, Bragg worked as a linotype operator for a printing firm in Richmond. He served his national service in the RAF. After retiring from football, he worked as an advertising manager for local newspapers in Twickenham. He was married with a son and two daughters and five grandchildren and at the time of his death in March 2016.

== Career statistics ==
Appearances and goals by club, season and competition
Club	Season	League			FA Cup		Total	
Club	Season	Division	Apps	Goals	Apps	Goals	Apps	Goals
Brentford	1946–47	First Division	1	0	0	0	1	0
Brentford	1951–52	Second Division	10	1	0	0	10	1
Brentford	1952–53	Second Division	38	0	3	0	41	0
Brentford	1953–54	Second Division	41	1	3	0	44	1
Brentford	1954–55	Third Division South	9	0	0	0	9	0
Brentford	1955–56	Third Division South	29	2	0	0	29	2
Brentford	1956–57	Third Division South	33	2	1	0	34	2
Career total			161	6	7	0	168	6

== Honours ==
- Brentford Hall of Fame
