= Len Roe =

English footballer (1932–2024)

Personal information
- Full name: Maurice Leonard Roe
- Date of birth: 11 January 1932
- Place of birth: Hayes, England
- Date of death: 24 June 2024 (aged 92)
- Position: Wing half

Senior career*
Years	Team	Apps	(Gls)
1950–1951	Ruislip Manor		
1951–1958	Brentford	7	(0)
1958–1959	Yiewsley		
- * Club domestic league appearances and goals

Maurice Leonard Roe (11 January 1932 – 24 June 2024) was an English professional footballer who played in the Football League for Brentford as a wing half. He later returned to Brentford in 1978, to coach the junior team.

Roe's brother, Don, played alongside him for the Brentford reserve team. Len Roe died on 24 June 2024, at the age of 92.

== Career statistics ==
Appearances and goals by club, season and competition
Club	Season	League			FA Cup		Total	
Club	Season	Division	Apps	Goals	Apps	Goals	Apps	Goals
Brentford	1954–55	Third Division South	1	0	0	0	1	0
Brentford	1955–56	Third Division South	4	0	1	0	5	0
Brentford	1956–57	Third Division South	2	0	0	0	2	0
Career total			7	0	8	0	7	0
