= Roy Hart (English footballer) =

English footballer

Personal information
- Full name: Roy Ernest Hart
- Date of birth: 30 May 1933
- Place of birth: Acton, England
- Date of death: June 2014 (aged 81)
- Place of death: West Sussex, England
- Position: Centre half

Youth career
- 1950–1954: Brentford

Senior career*
Years	Team	Apps	(Gls)
1954–1955	Brentford	2	(0)

International career
1948	England Schoolboys	2	(0)
- * Club domestic league appearances and goals

Roy Ernest Hart (30 May 1933 – June 2014) was an English professional footballer who played in the Football League for Brentford as a centre half.

== Career statistics ==
Appearances and goals by club, season and competition
Club	Season	League			FA Cup		Total	
Club	Season	Division	Apps	Goals	Apps	Goals	Apps	Goals
Brentford	1954–55	Third Division South	2	0	0	0	2	0
Career total			2	0	0	0	2	0
