= Wendell Morgan =

Welsh footballer and manager (born 1935)

Personal information
- Full name: Wendell Morgan
- Date of birth: 22 April 1935 (age 91)
- Place of birth: Gorseinon, Wales
- Positions: Wing half; outside left

Youth career
- Grovesend Welfare
- 1952–1954: Cardiff City
- 1954–1955: Brentford

Senior career*
Years	Team	Apps	(Gls)
1955–1957	Brentford	47	(6)
1957–1958	Gillingham	34	(3)
1958–1959	Swansea Town	7	(0)
1959–1960	Newport County	26	(3)
1960–1961	Carlisle United	36	(2)
1961–1962	Llanelly		

Managerial career
- Garden Village
- * Club domestic league appearances and goals

Wendell Morgan (born 22 April 1935) is a Welsh retired professional footballer who played as a wing half and outside left in the Football League for Brentford, Carlisle United and Gillingham. Though Morgan did not make a first team appearance while with Cardiff City early in his career, his later spells with Swansea Town and Newport County made him one of a small group of players who have been contracted to all three South Wales Football League clubs.

== Club career ==
=== Early years ===
Morgan began his career with local Gorseinon non-League club Grovesend Welfare, before moving to First Division club Cardiff City in May 1952. He failed to make an appearance for the first team before departing in June 1954.

=== Brentford ===
Morgan signed for newly relegated Third Division South club Brentford in June 1954, after writing a letter to manager Bill Dodgin to request a trial. He spent the 1954–55 season in the reserve team and finally made the first senior appearance of his career in a 3–0 victory over Crystal Palace on 15 October 1955. He made 16 further appearances during the 1955–56 season and scored five goals. After making five early-1957–58 season appearances, Morgan left the Bees. He made 49 appearances and scored six goals during just under two years as a first team player at Griffin Park.

=== Gillingham ===
Morgan signed for Third Division South strugglers Gillingham on a free transfer in September 1957. He immediately established himself in the team, making 38 appearances and scoring four goals, but he could not help the Gills suffering relegation to the Fourth Division at the end of the 1957–58 season. He departed Priestfield in July 1958.

=== Swansea Town ===
Morgan returned home to West Glamorgan to sign for Second Division club Swansea Town for a £5,000 fee in July 1958. He was kept out of the team by fellow outside left Norman Lawson and made just seven appearances during the 1958–59 season. He left Vetch Field in June 1959.

=== Newport County ===
Morgan moved across South Wales to join Third Division club Newport County in June 1959. He made 26 league appearances and scored three goals during the 1959–60 season, but the club finished in mid-table mediocrity. He left the club in July 1960.

=== Carlisle United ===
Morgan moved back to England to join Fourth Division club Carlisle United in July 1960. He made 36 league appearances and scored two goals during his season with the club.

=== Llanelli ===
Morgan ended his career with Welsh League First Division club Llanelly during the 1961–62 season.

== Representative career ==
As a boy, Morgan represented the Great Britain Boys Clubs team.

== Managerial career ==
After his retirement from football, Morgan served as manager at Welsh lower league club Garden Village.

== Career statistics ==
Appearances and goals by club, season and competition
Club	Season	League			FA Cup		Total	
Club	Season	Division	Apps	Goals	Apps	Goals	Apps	Goals
Brentford	1955–56	Third Division South	16	5	1	0	17	5
Brentford	1956–57	Third Division South	26	1	1	0	27	1
Brentford	1957–58	Third Division South	5	0	—		5	0
Brentford	Total		47	6	2	0	49	6
Gillingham	1957–58	Third Division South	34	3	4	1	38	4
Career total			81	9	6	1	87	10
