= Woodhams =

Woodhams is a surname. Notable people with the surname include:

- Edwin Woodhams (1880–1933), English cricketer
- Grant Woodhams (born 1952), Australian politician
- Richard Woodhams (born 1949), American classical oboist
- Stephen Woodhams (born c. 1964), English gardener

== See also ==
- Woodham (disambiguation)
