= John Pearson (footballer, born 1935) =

English footballer and manager

Personal information
- Full name: John Arthur Pearson
- Date of birth: 23 April 1935 (age 91)
- Place of birth: Isleworth, England
- Position: Inside left

Youth career
- Chase Of Chertsey
- 1951–1955: Brentford

Senior career*
Years	Team	Apps	(Gls)
1955–1958	Brentford	5	(0)
1958–1960	Queens Park Rangers	21	(9)
- Kettering Town
- Dover
- Folkestone Town
- Stevenage Town
- Crawley Town
- Yiewsley
- Chertsey Town

Managerial career
- Chertsey Town (player-manager)
- * Club domestic league appearances and goals

John Arthur Pearson (born 23 April 1935) is an English former football player and manager who played in the Football League for Brentford and Queens Park Rangers. An inside left, he later had a long career in non-League football.

== Playing career ==
=== Brentford ===
An inside left, Pearson began his career at Third Division South club Brentford, after joining from Chase Of Chertsey in 1951. He was a part of the Brentford youth team which reached the semi-finals of the 1952–53 FA Youth Cup. He made his professional debut in a 3–0 victory over Colchester United on 10 September 1955. It proved to be his first of four appearances during the 1955–56 season. Pearson failed to establish himself in the first team at Griffin Park and made just one further appearance, before being transfer-listed at the end of the 1957–58 season.

=== Queens Park Rangers ===
Pearson transferred to West London rivals Queens Park Rangers in June 1958. He had a good start to his career at Loftus Road, scoring six goals in 16 Third Division appearances during the 1958–59 season. He scored three goals in five appearances during the 1959–60 season, before departing the club.

=== Non-League football ===
After his release from Queens Park Rangers, Pearson dropped into non-League football, playing for Kettering Town, Dover, Folkestone Town, Stevenage Town, Crawley Town, Yiewsley and Chertsey Town.

== Management career ==
While with Chertsey Town, Pearson served as player-manager at the club.

== Career statistics ==
Appearances and goals by club, season and competition
Club	Season	League			FA Cup		Total	
Club	Season	Division	Apps	Goals	Apps	Goals	Apps	Goals
Brentford	1955–56	Third Division South	4	0	0	0	4	0
Brentford	1956–57	Third Division South	1	0	0	0	1	0
Brentford	Total		5	0	0	0	5	0
Queens Park Rangers	1958–59	Third Division	16	6	0	0	16	6
Queens Park Rangers	1959–60	Third Division	5	3	0	0	5	3
Queens Park Rangers	Total		21	9	0	0	21	9
Career total			26	9	0	0	26	9
