= Jeff Taylor (footballer) =

English footballer and singer (1930–2010)

Personal information
- Full name: Jeffrey Neilson Taylor
- Date of birth: 20 September 1930
- Place of birth: Huddersfield, England
- Date of death: 28 December 2010 (aged 80)
- Place of death: Holmfirth, England
- Position: Forward

Senior career*
Years	Team	Apps	(Gls)
1949–1951	Huddersfield Town	68	(27)
1951–1954	Fulham	33	(14)
1954–1957	Brentford	94	(34)
- * Club domestic league appearances and goals

Jeffrey Neilson Taylor (20 September 1930 – 28 December 2010) was an English professional footballer who played in the Football League for Huddersfield Town, Fulham and Brentford as a forward. He went on to perform opera.

== Football career ==
In an eight-year career as a professional footballer, Taylor played in the First Division, Second Division and Third Division South of the Football League for Huddersfield Town, Fulham and Brentford respectively. Taylor scored in double-figures in his first two seasons with Huddersfield Town. He moved to Fulham in November 1951 and scored a hat-trick in one of his early appearances against Middlesbrough, before his music studies began to take precedence and he dropped out of the first team picture. He was Brentford's second-highest scorer in the 1956–57 season, his last in football. Taylor finished his career having scored 84 goals in 204 games. Looking back in 1997 on his premature retirement, Taylor said, "singing won the day. I had no long-term ambitions in football and I realised that it was impossible to marry the two".

== Opera career ==
While still a footballer, Taylor was able to use his wages to pay for his studies in singing and piano at the Royal Academy of Music. Taylor performed opera under the name "Neilson Taylor" and was a bass baritone. After retiring from football, he joined the Yorkshire Opera Company. Taylor moved on in 1962 to understudy Michel Roux in Pelléas et Mélisande and Walter Alberti and John Shirley-Quirk in L'incoronazione di Poppea at Glyndebourne. His time at Glyndebourne proved to be a breakthrough and he toured the world, spending time in Australia and a year at Mantua in Italy, which led to work at the Royal Opera House in Covent Garden and in Rotterdam. He appeared on the 1971 Unicorn recording A Peter Warlock Merry-Go-Down, subtitle "songs, catches and poems, sociable, amorous and bibulous", which was put together by Fred Tomlinson. It was reissued in 2024.

Taylor failed fully to deliver on his promise as a performer, but found fulfilment when he was made Professor of Singing at the Royal Scottish Academy of Music in Glasgow and he remained in the role for 18 years.

== Personal life ==
His younger brother, Ken Taylor also played football for Huddersfield. Ken was also a professional cricketer, playing three Tests for England and first-class cricket for Yorkshire. Ken's son (Jeff's nephew) Nick Taylor also played cricket for Yorkshire. While still a footballer, Taylor studied for a degree in Geography at London University. After retiring from teaching, Taylor retired to Yorkshire.

== Career statistics ==
Appearances and goals by club, season and competition
Club	Season	League			FA Cup		Total	
Club	Season	Division	Apps	Goals	Apps	Goals	Apps	Goals
Huddersfield Town	1949–50	First Division	21	11	0	0	21	11
Huddersfield Town	1950–51	First Division	34	11	3	2	37	13
Huddersfield Town	1951–52	First Division	13	5	―		13	5
Huddersfield Town	Total		68	27	3	2	71	29
Fulham	1951–52	First Division	21	4	0	0	21	4
Brentford	1954–55	Third Division South	13	4	0	0	13	4
Brentford	1955–56	Third Division South	43	15	2	1	45	16
Brentford	1956–57	Third Division South	38	15	2	2	40	17
Brentford	Total		94	34	4	3	98	37
Career total			203	73	7	5	210	78
