= John Beal =

John Beal may refer to:

- John Beal (actor) (1909–1997), American actor
- John Beal (composer) (born 1947), American film composer and conductor
- John W. Beal (1887–1971), American architect

== See also ==
- John Beall (disambiguation)
- John Beale (disambiguation)
