= Ian Dargie (footballer, born 1931) =

English footballer and coach

Personal information
- Full name: Ian Charles Dargie
- Date of birth: 3 October 1931
- Place of birth: Camberwell, England
- Date of death: 27 November 2015 (aged 84)
- Place of death: Haverfordwest, Wales
- Positions: Centre half; inside right

Youth career
- –1952: Tonbridge

Senior career*
Years	Team	Apps	(Gls)
1952–1963	Brentford	263	(2)
1963–1964	Yiewsley		
- * Club domestic league appearances and goals

Ian Charles Dargie (3 October 1931 – 27 November 2015) was an English professional footballer and coach, who played as a centre half. He is best remembered for his 11-year spell in the Football League with Brentford, for whom he made over 280 appearances.

== Playing career ==
=== Brentford ===
Dargie began his career Southern League club Tonbridge and joined Second Division club Brentford in February 1952. He made his debut for the club on 19 April 1952 in a 4–1 defeat to Hull City as an inside right. After moving back to centre half, Dargie endured a slow start to his time at Griffin Park, failing to make a breakthrough into the first team until after the Bees were relegation to the Third Division South in 1954, making 22 appearances during the 1954–55 season. Dargie became an integral part of the team was an ever-present during the 1957–58 season, appearing in all 46 league games.

Towards the end of the 1958–59 season, Brentford looked poised to secure promotion back to the Second Division and in recognition of his record of 100th consecutive league appearances, Dargie was handed the captaincy for a league match versus Southampton on 9 March 1959. Brentford won 6–0 at The Dell. A cracked shinbone suffered on Easter Saturday 1959 sidelined Dargie for the remainder of the campaign and the team's defensive record worsened.

Dargie was again an ever-present during the 1960–61 season, making a career-high 51 appearances. Brentford suffered relegation to the Fourth Division in 1962 and Dargie fell behind Peter Gelson and Mel Scott in the pecking order. He departed the club at the end of the 1962–63 Fourth Division title-winning season and failed to make enough appearances to qualify for a medal. Dargie made 281 appearances and scored two goals during his time with the Bees and was posthumously inducted into the club's Hall of Fame in May 2018.

=== Non-League football ===
Dargie dropped into non-League football in 1963 and joined Southern League First Division club Yiewsley.

== Later career and death ==
After his retirement, Dargie became physio and youth team coach at Crystal Palace, serving the club until 1982. He was part of the coaching staff at Charlton Athletic between 1985 and 1988, before reverting to an administrative role. He died on 27 November 2015 in Haverfordwest, Wales, at the age of 84.

== Career statistics ==
Appearances and goals by club, season and competition
Club	Season	League			FA Cup		League Cup		Total	
Club	Season	Division	Apps	Goals	Apps	Goals	Apps	Goals	Apps	Goals
Brentford	1951–52	Second Division	1	0	—		—		1	0
Brentford	1952–53	Second Division	10	0	0	0	—		10	0
Brentford	1953–54	Second Division	14	0	1	0	—		15	0
Brentford	1954–55	Third Division South	20	0	2	0	—		22	0
Brentford	1955–56	Third Division South	4	0	0	0	—		4	0
Brentford	1956–57	Third Division South	27	1	3	0	—		30	1
Brentford	1957–58	Third Division South	46	0	1	0	—		47	0
Brentford	1958–59	Third Division	37	1	4	0	—		41	1
Brentford	1959–60	Third Division	20	0	0	0	—		20	0
Brentford	1960–61	Third Division	46	0	2	0	3	0	51	0
Brentford	1961–62	Third Division	35	0	1	0	1	0	37	0
Brentford	1962–63	Fourth Division	3	0	0	0	0	0	3	0
Career total			263	2	14	0	4	0	281	2

== Honours ==
- Brentford Hall of Fame
