= Alan Bassham =

English footballer (1933–1982)

Personal information
- Full name: Alan John Bassham
- Date of birth: 3 October 1933
- Place of birth: Kensington, England
- Date of death: 1982 (aged 48–49)
- Place of death: Richmond, England
- Position: Right back

Youth career
- –1951: Brentford

Senior career*
Years	Team	Apps	(Gls)
1951–1959	Brentford	43	(0)
- Folkestone Town

International career
1949	England Schoolboys	4	(0)
- * Club domestic league appearances and goals

Alan John Bassham (3 October 1933 – 1982) was an English professional footballer who played in the Football League for Brentford as a right back.

== Club career ==
Bassham began his career in the youth team at Second Division club Brentford as an inside or outside forward and was developed into a right half. He turned professional in October 1951 and was further developed into a full back, but he had to wait nearly two years to make his senior debut, which came in a 1–1 draw with Stoke City on 19 August 1953.

After Brentford's relegation to the Third Division South for the 1954–55 season, Bassham made a minor breakthrough into the team and made 17 appearances. He gradually lost his place and played mostly for the reserves during his final years with the club. Bassham made 45 appearances during his time with Brentford and was given a free transfer in May 1959. He played out his career with Kent League club Folkestone Town.

== International career ==
Bassham won four caps for England Schoolboys at international level.

== Career statistics ==
Appearances and goals by club, season and competition
Club	Season	League			FA Cup		Total	
Club	Season	Division	Apps	Goals	Apps	Goals	Apps	Goals
Brentford	1953–54	Second Division	2	0	0	0	2	0
Brentford	1954–55	Third Division South	17	0	0	0	17	0
Brentford	1955–56	Third Division South	10	0	0	0	10	0
Brentford	1956–57	Third Division South	12	0	2	0	14	0
Brentford	1957–58	Third Division South	2	0	0	0	2	0
Career total			43	0	2	0	45	0
