= George Lowden (footballer) =

English footballer

Personal information
- Full name: George Lowden
- Date of birth: 2 March 1933 (age 93)
- Place of birth: Isleworth, England
- Position: Left back

Youth career
- 1951–1953: Brentford

Senior career*
Years	Team	Apps	(Gls)
1953–1959	Brentford	29	(0)
- Hounslow Town
- Yiewsley
- * Club domestic league appearances and goals

George Lowden (born 2 March 1933) is an English former professional footballer who played in the Football League for Brentford as a left back.

== Career ==
Lowden began his career as an amateur in the reserve team at Brentford and signed professionally for the club in 1953, after completing his National Service in Egypt. He made his debut in a 4–1 Second Division defeat to Doncaster Rovers on 10 September 1953. He managed only 29 senior appearances for the Bees in eight years at Griffin Park, but made over 200 appearances for the reserve team and was developed as a centre half.

== Career statistics ==
Appearances and goals by club, season and competition
Club	Season	League			FA Cup		Total	
Club	Season	Division	Apps	Goals	Apps	Goals	Apps	Goals
Brentford	1953–54	Second Division	1	0	0	0	1	0
Brentford	1954–55	Third Division South	10	0	0	0	10	0
Brentford	1955–56	Third Division South	15	0	0	0	15	0
Brentford	1956–57	Third Division South	3	0	0	0	3	0
Career total			29	0	0	0	29	0
