= Dennis Heath =

English footballer and manager

Personal information
- Full name: Dennis John Heath
- Date of birth: 28 September 1934
- Place of birth: Chiswick, England
- Date of death: 28 September 2006 (aged 72)
- Place of death: Isleworth, England
- Position: Outside right

Youth career
- Alexandra Villa
- 1949–1954: Brentford

Senior career*
| Years | Team | Apps | (Gls) |
| 1954–1961 | Brentford | 123 | (20) |
| 1961 | Bedford Town | 19 | (0) |
- Trowbridge Town
- Dover
- Chertsey Town

Managerial career
- Chertsey Town (player-manager)
- * Club domestic league appearances and goals

Dennis John Heath (28 September 1934 – 28 September 2006) was an English professional footballer and manager who made over 120 appearances as an outside right in The Football League for Brentford.

== Playing career ==
=== Brentford ===
An outside right, Heath began his career at Acton, Brentford & Chiswick Schools' League club Alexandra Villa. He was spotted by Brentford youth team manager Alf Bew at age 15. Heath came through the youth ranks at Brentford and was a part of the youth team which reached the semi-finals of the 1952–53 FA Youth Cup. After completing his National Service, Heath made his debut at the age of 19 in a 6–4 Third Division South defeat to Southampton at The Dell on 21 August 1954. Heath quickly established himself in the first team and made 39 appearances during the 1954–55 season.

Heath's appearance-rate dropped off over the course of his career with the Bees (mainly due to a pierced lung suffered in a reserve match against Charlton Athletic during the 1956–57 season), though he made 29 appearances during the 1958–59 season. Heath's final appearance for the club came in a 4–2 defeat to Newport County at Griffin Park on 29 October 1960 and he was released at the end of the 1960–61 season. He made 133 appearances and scored 20 goals during his seven-year spell with the Bees.

=== Non-League football ===
After his release from Brentford, Heath dropped into non-League football and played for Bedford Town, Trowbridge Town, Dover, Chertsey Town and veterans' team Eversheds. He played for Eversheds until the age of 60.

== Management career ==
While with Chertsey Town, Heath acted as the club's player-manager.

== Personal life ==
Heath undertook his National Service at Catterick Garrison and served as a PT instructor. Along with a number of other Brentford players, Heath appeared briefly in the 1953 film The Great Game. Heath later entered the building trade and worked with his sons. He died in 2006, on his 72nd birthday. At the time of his death, he was living in Isleworth.

== Career statistics ==
Appearances and goals by club, season and competition
| Club | Season | League | | | FA Cup | | League Cup | | Total | |
| Club | Season | Division | Apps | Goals | Apps | Goals | Apps | Goals | Apps | Goals |
|---|---|---|---|---|---|---|---|---|---|---|
| Brentford | 1954–55 | Third Division South | 35 | 7 | 4 | 0 | — | | 39 | 7 |
| Brentford | 1955–56 | Third Division South | 17 | 1 | 1 | 0 | — | | 18 | 1 |
| Brentford | 1956–57 | Third Division South | 3 | 0 | 1 | 0 | — | | 4 | 0 |
| Brentford | 1957–58 | Third Division South | 15 | 5 | 0 | 0 | — | | 15 | 5 |
| Brentford | 1958–59 | Third Division | 25 | 4 | 4 | 0 | — | | 29 | 4 |
| Brentford | 1959–60 | Third Division | 13 | 2 | 0 | 0 | — | | 13 | 2 |
| Brentford | 1960–61 | Third Division | 15 | 1 | 0 | 0 | 0 | 0 | 15 | 1 |
| Career total | | | 123 | 20 | 10 | 0 | 0 | 0 | 133 | 20 |
