= John Beall =

John Beall may refer to:

- John Yates Beall (1835–1865), Confederate privateer in the American Civil War, arrested and executed as a spy
- J. Glenn Beall Jr. (1927–2006), American politician and businessman
- Johnny Beall (1882–1926), American baseball player

== See also ==
- John Beal (disambiguation)
- John Beale (disambiguation)
