= Woodham =

Woodham may refer to:

== Places ==
=== Canada ===
- Woodham, Ontario
- Mount Woodham, a defunct house on the Lislehurst estate in Mississauga, Ontario

=== England ===
- Woodham, Buckinghamshire
- Woodham, County Durham
- Woodham, Surrey
- Woodham Ferrers, Essex
- South Woodham Ferrers, Essex
- Woodham Mortimer, Essex
- Woodham Walter, Essex

== Schools ==
- Woodham Academy, County Durham, England
- Woodham High School, Pensacola, Florida

== Golf Clubs ==
- Woodham Golf and Country Club, County Durham, United Kingdom

== People ==
- Cecil Woodham-Smith (1896 – 1977), a British historian
- Dai Woodham (1919 – 1994), a British businessman
- Luke Woodham (born 1981), American perpetrator of the 1997 Pearl High School shooting

== Other uses ==
- Little Woodham, a living museum in Hampshire, England
- South Woodham Ferrers railway station, Essex, England
- Woodham Brothers scrapyard, in Barry, Wales

== See also ==
- Woodhams
