= Ken Morgan (footballer) =

Welsh footballer

Personal information
- Full name: Kenneth Sidney Morgan
- Date of birth: 28 July 1932
- Place of birth: Swansea, Wales
- Date of death: 20 December 2008 (aged 76)
- Place of death: Watford, England
- Position: Outside right

Senior career*
Years	Team	Apps	(Gls)
–1950	Rickmansworth		
1950–1952	Fulham	0	(0)
1952–1954	Watford	0	(0)
1954–1955	Northampton Town	0	(0)
1955	Brentford	0	(0)
1955–1956	Crystal Palace	1	(0)
- Guildford City
- * Club domestic league appearances and goals

Ken Morgan (28 July 1932 – 20 December 2008) was a Welsh professional footballer who made one appearance in the Football League for Crystal Palace as an outside right.
