= Cecil Andrews =

English footballer

Personal information
- Full name: Cecil James Andrews
- Date of birth: 1 November 1930
- Place of birth: Alton, England
- Date of death: 11 July 1986 (age 55)
- Place of death: Ealing, London, England
- Position: Wing half

Senior career*
Years	Team	Apps	(Gls)
1949–1952	Portsmouth	0	(0)
1952–1956	Crystal Palace	104	(11)
1956–1958	Queens Park Rangers	58	(1)
1958–1959	Sittingbourne	?	(?)
Total		162	(12)
- * Club domestic league appearances and goals

Cecil James "Archie" Andrews (1 November 1930 – July 1986) was an English footballer who played as a wing half in the Football League for Crystal Palace and Queens Park Rangers. He also played non-league football for Sittingbourne.

== Playing career ==
Andrews began his career with Portsmouth but did not make a League appearance for the club before signing for Crystal Palace in June 1952. He made his debut on 7 September 1952 in an away 5–0 defeat to Bristol City. He kept his place for the following game but did not appear again until February 1953. He went on to make a total of 104 league appearances for Palace, over four seasons, scoring 11 goals.

In June 1956, Andrews moved on to Queens Park Rangers, for whom he made a total of 58 league appearances, over the next two seasons (scoring once), before moving into non-league football with Sittingbourne.

Andrews was nicknamed "Archie" after the comic book character of the period.

Cecil Andrews died on 11 July 1986 aged 55.
