= Jimmy Stirling =

Scottish footballer

Personal information
- Full name: James Russell Stirling
- Date of birth: 23 July 1925
- Place of birth: Airdrie, Scotland
- Date of death: November 2006 (aged 81)
- Place of death: Brockenhurst, England
- Position: Centre half

Senior career*
Years	Team	Apps	(Gls)
- Coltness United
1947–1950	Bournemouth	73	(1)
1950	Birmingham City	0	(0)
	Southend United	218	(2)
- Poole Town
- * Club domestic league appearances and goals

James Russell Stirling (23 July 1925 – November 2006) was a Scottish professional football centre half who made over 210 appearances in the Football League for Southend United.
