= Jim Towers =

English footballer (1933–2010)

Personal information
- Full name: Edwin James Towers
- Date of birth: 15 April 1933
- Place of birth: Shepherd's Bush, England
- Date of death: 16 September 2010 (aged 77)
- Place of death: Hounslow, England
- Height: 6 ft 0 in (1.83 m)
- Position: Centre forward

Youth career
- 1948–1954: Brentford

Senior career*
Years	Team	Apps	(Gls)
1954–1961	Brentford	262	(153)
1961–1962	Queens Park Rangers	27	(15)
1962–1963	Millwall	19	(7)
1963	Gillingham	8	(6)
1963–1964	Aldershot	32	(15)
1964–1965	Romford	30	(17)
1965–1968	Gravesend & Northfleet	77	(46)
Total		428	(274)
- * Club domestic league appearances and goals

Edwin James Towers (15 April 1933 – 16 September 2010) was an English professional footballer, best remembered for his time as a centre forward in the Football League with Brentford. He is the club's all-time leading goalscorer and in 2013 was voted the club's greatest ever player.

== Career ==
=== Brentford ===
==== Youth years ====
Born in Shepherd's Bush, Towers began his career as a schoolboy, playing for his local Gaumont cinema team. He frequently played against another boy, the Acton Odeon cinema team's George Francis, with whom Towers' future professional career would be intertwined. Towers, along with Francis, progressed through the Acton and Brentford & Chiswick school teams. Towers also had a try-out at Fulham before signing for the junior team at Second Division club Brentford in 1948, after being spotted by manager Alf Bew while playing for his local Shepherd's Bush schoolboys team versus Brentford in Boston Manor Park. Towers was offered a professional contract in 1951, prior to departing to undertake his National Service.

==== 1953–1958 ====
After returning to Griffin Park in 1953 and signing another contract, Towers made his professional debut on 30 August 1954 as an outside forward and made a dream start, by scoring in a 2–2 Third Division South draw with Shrewsbury Town. He was soon moved back to his natural centre forward position by Bill Dodgin and made 37 appearances and scored 16 goals during the 1954–55 season as the Bees finished in mid-table. The Bees challenged for promotion during the 1955–56 season, but ultimately finished in sixth place, with Towers scoring 22 goals in 41 appearances.

George Francis broke into the team during the 1956–57 season and so began the most productive strike partnership in Brentford history, with one London evening newspaper dubbing the pair 'the Terrible Twins'. After a lean 1956–57 season (scoring 13 goals), Towers found his form again in 1957–58, scoring 29 goals in 36 games to set a new single-season post-war club goalscoring record. The season ended in disappointment after Brentford were edged off the top of the Third Division South by Brighton & Hove Albion.

==== 1958–1959 ====
Towers' most lethal season in front of goal came in 1958–59, scoring 37 goals in 50 appearances and finishing one goal shy of Jack Holliday's goals-in-a-season record set in the 1932–33 season. Towers was the top scorer in the Third Division in 1958–59 (with 32 goals) and the Towers-Francis partnership yielded 61 of Brentford's 83 goals for the entire season. A highlight of the season was a four-goal haul in a 6–0 thrashing of Southampton at The Dell on 9 March 1959. Towers' profile rose and he was the subject of bids from higher league clubs Sheffield Wednesday and Norwich City, but he turned the offers down, as due to the maximum wage he was unwilling to move for what would only have been a £2 per week increase to his £18 per week wages.

==== Final years and departure ====
Two further seasons followed, with Towers' last at Griffin Park being 1960–61. In a bizarre move by the club's hierarchy (in response to the removal of the maximum wage), Towers and Francis were deemed surplus requirements and sold. In 2005, Towers revealed that he was "almost begged" to leave Brentford. A potential deal for Towers to return to the Bees during the 1961–62 season collapsed. He was given a testimonial in 1986, which he shared with Johnny Rainford (a former teammate who laid on many of the passes for Towers and Francis from which to score) and the pair shared the £1,100 proceeds. Towers is the club's all-time top scorer with 163 goals in 282 games. In a Football League 125th anniversary poll, Towers was voted as the club's greatest ever player. He was posthumously inducted into the Brentford Hall of Fame in 2015.

=== Queens Park Rangers ===
Towers and Francis joined Brentford's Third Division West London rivals Queens Park Rangers in an £8,000 deal in May 1961. He opened his Rangers goalscoring account by breaking Brentford hearts, when he scored in a 3–0 victory in the West London derby on the opening day of the season. He fired in 16 goals in 32 appearances to help Rangers to a fourth-place finish and departed the club in August 1962.

=== Millwall ===
Towers signed for Third Division club Millwall in August 1962 for a £5,000 fee. He scored eight goals in his opening 21 games, but departed in January 1963.

=== Gillingham ===
Towers dropped down to the Fourth Division to reunite with George Francis at Gillingham in January 1963. He showed good form (scoring six goals in just eight games), but had an agonising end to the season after the Gills missed out on promotion with a fifth-place finish. He departed the club in July 1963.

=== Aldershot ===
Towers joined Fourth Division club Aldershot in July 1963. Despite a mid-table finish in the league, he enjoyed a good 1963–64 season at the Recreation Ground, scoring 15 goals in 32 games, including a goal in the FA Cup third round giant-killing of Aston Villa. He departed the club after the season.

=== Romford ===
Towers dropped into non-League football and signed for Southern League Premier Division club Romford during the 1964 off-season. His 31 goals (a club record) could not help Boro to better than a 14th-place finish in the league and he departed the club at the end of the 1964–65 season.

=== Gravesend & Northfleet ===
Towers joined Southern League First Division strugglers Gravesend & Northfleet in July 1965. He spent three seasons with the club and scored 46 goals in 77 appearances. He retired from football, aged 35, at the end of the 1967–68 season.

== Personal life ==
Prior to signing for Brentford, Towers grew up a supporter of arch-rivals Fulham. He undertook his National Service alongside George Francis in Germany with the Royal Irish Fusiliers and he represented the British Army of the Rhine team. Towers was married to Betty, had three children and after his retirement from football, he worked for 25 years as a baggage handler for British Airways at London Heathrow Airport. He died in September 2010, after suffering with a serious illness.

== Career statistics ==
Appearances and goals by club, season and competition
Club	Season	League			FA Cup		League Cup		Total	
Club	Season	Division	Apps	Goals	Apps	Goals	Apps	Goals	Apps	Goals
Brentford	1954–55	Third Division South	31	15	6	1	—		37	16
Brentford	1955–56	Third Division South	39	21	2	1	—		41	22
Brentford	1956–57	Third Division South	24	12	1	1	—		25	13
Brentford	1957–58	Third Division South	36	29	0	0	—		36	29
Brentford	1958–59	Third Division	46	32	4	5	—		50	37
Brentford	1959–60	Third Division	44	23	2	1	—		46	24
Brentford	1960–61	Third Division	42	21	2	0	3	1	47	22
Brentford	Total		262	153	17	9	3	1	282	163
Queens Park Rangers	1961–62	Third Division	27	15	3	0	2	1	32	16
Millwall	1962–63	Third Division	19	7	1	0	1	1	21	8
Gillingham	1962–63	Fourth Division	8	6	—		—		8	6
Career total			316	181	21	9	6	3	343	193

== Honours ==
- Brentford Hall of Fame
