= Leonard Geard =

English footballer

Personal information
- Full name: Leonard Geard
- Date of birth: 12 February 1934 (age 92)
- Place of birth: Hammersmith, England
- Position: Wing half

Youth career
- 1951–1953: Fulham

Senior career*
Years	Team	Apps	(Gls)
1953–1956	Brentford	4	(0)
- Kettering Town
- * Club domestic league appearances and goals

Leonard Geard (born 12 February 1934) is an English retired professional footballer who played in the Football League for Brentford as a wing half.

== Career ==
A wing half, Geard began his career in the youth system at Fulham, but departed in March 1953, without making a first team appearance. Geard transferred to Fulham's West London rivals Brentford, but due to having to undertake his National Service, he was unable to make his professional debut until 27 April 1955, in a 1–1 Third Division South draw with Crystal Palace. He made a further three appearances during the 1955–56 season, before being released at the end of the campaign. Geard dropped into non-League football and signed for Southern League club Kettering Town, with whom he won the 1956–57 division title.

== Career statistics ==
Appearances and goals by club, season and competition
Club	Season	League			FA Cup		Total	
Club	Season	Division	Apps	Goals	Apps	Goals	Apps	Goals
Brentford	1954–55	Third Division South	1	0	0	0	1	0
Brentford	1955–56	Third Division South	3	0	0	0	3	0
Career total			4	0	0	0	4	0

== Honours ==
Kettering Town

- Southern League: 1956–57
