= Eddie McLaren =

Scottish footballer (1929–2020)

Personal information
- Full name: Edward McLaren
- Date of birth: 8 September 1929
- Place of birth: Dundee, Scotland
- Date of death: 23 December 2020 (aged 91)
- Place of death: Reading, England
- Positions: Right back; wing half

Senior career*
Years	Team	Apps	(Gls)
- Dunkeld Juniors
1948–1952	Blackpool	0	(0)
1952–1959	Reading	184	(2)
- Guildford City
- * Club domestic league appearances and goals

Edward McLaren (8 September 1929 – 23 December 2020) was a Scottish professional footballer who made over 180 appearances as a right back and wing half in the Football League for Reading.
