= Stephen Woodhams =

English gardener (born c. 1964)

Stephen Woodhams (born c. 1964) is an English gardener. He was one of the youngest gardeners ever to win a Gold Medal at the Chelsea Flower Show in 1994 for Mr. Maidment's Garden. He was also awarded Silver Medals in 1996, 1997 and 2000. In 2002, his Sanctuary garden, sponsored by Merrill Lynch, won him his second Gold Medal.

At the age of sixteen, Woodhams achieved a place at the Royal Horticultural Society's Garden at Wisley from where he graduated with honours. He went on to become buyer consultant at the London florists, Moyses Stevens, and in 1986 won a youth enterprise grant of £40 a week with which he set up his own business in his garden shed at the age of 22.

In 1992 he opened his first shop in Ledbury Road, London W1, and quickly established a portfolio of clients including Max Mara, Joseph, Michel Roux, and the Hempel. He has also been asked to style nine Royal Opera House Galas, the re-opening of the Royal Opera House, Covent Garden, the décor for the Centrepoint Ball at the Natural History Museum, and the styling of the inaugural dinner at the Tate Modern, Bankside.

In 1998, he opened Woodhams at One Aldwych; the hotel has since won the accolade of "Best Floral Hotel in the World" from Condé Nast Traveller magazine. In 2002, he opened another shop in Belgravia on Elizabeth Street. This second shop became the flagship store.

In 2008, he set up a new design business, Stephen Woodhams Design Ltd to enable him to focus on design projects in the UK, and on larger commissions in Mallorca, Ibiza, Saint-Tropez and Barbados. In 2009, Woodhams opened a design office in Ibiza, Spain.

== Publications ==
- Woodhams, Stephen (1995), The Country Dried Flower Companion, Collins Publishers, San Francisco, ISBN 0-00-255492-5
- Woodhams, Stephen and Eason, Lorry (1998), Flower Power : innovative flower arrangements for all occasions, Quadrille, London, ISBN 1-899988-03-3
- Woodhams, Stephen (1998), Flower Palettes : arranging flowers using color as your guide, Clarkson Potter, New York, ISBN 0-609-60363-9
- Mandleberg, Hilary and Woodhams, Stephen (1999), Dried Flowers, Ryland Peters & Small, London, ISBN 1-84172-005-4
- Woodhams, Stephen and Wood, Andrew (2000), Portfolio of Contemporary Gardens, Rockport Publishers, Gloucester, MA, ISBN 1-56496-754-9
- Woodhams, Stephen (2004), Flowers, Quadrille, London, ISBN 1-84400-134-2
