= George Francis (footballer) =

English footballer (1934–2014)

Personal information
- Full name: George Edward Francis
- Date of birth: 4 February 1934
- Place of birth: Acton, England
- Date of death: 22 October 2014 (aged 80)
- Place of death: Slough, England
- Height: 5 ft 9 in (1.75 m)
- Position: Centre forward

Youth career
- 1949–1955: Brentford

Senior career*
Years	Team	Apps	(Gls)
1955–1961	Brentford	228	(110)
1961	Queens Park Rangers	2	(1)
1961–1962	Brentford	32	(14)
1962–1964	Gillingham	51	(19)
1964–1965	Hastings United		
- Hillingdon Borough
1967	Stevenage Town	6	(0)
Total		404	(144)
- * Club domestic league appearances and goals

George Edward Francis (4 February 1934 – 22 October 2014) was an English professional footballer, best remembered for his two spells as a centre forward in the Football League with Brentford. He is a member of the Brentford Hall of Fame and is synonymous with Jim Towers – their close friendship and strike partnership saw the pair dubbed 'The Terrible Twins'.

== Career ==
=== Early years ===
A centre forward, Francis began his career as a schoolboy with a team fielded by the Odeon cinema in his hometown of Acton. He regularly played against Jim Towers of the local Gaumont cinema team and the pair would later link up as professionals at Brentford. Francis later represented the Acton, Brentford & Chiswick schools' team.

=== Brentford ===
Francis signed for the junior team at Second Division club Brentford in 1949, after rejecting an offer from Blackburn Rovers. He progressed to the youth team and signed his first professional contract in January 1953, but had to wait until 1955 to make his first team debut, which came in a Third Division South match versus Walsall on 19 February. Francis had a dream start, scoring a late equaliser in a 2–2 draw. He made two further appearances in what remained of the 1954–55 season and scored another goal. Francis made a minor breakthrough into the first team during the 1955–56 season, making 18 appearances, scoring eight goals and beginning a strike partnership with friend Jim Towers. He made his full breakthrough in the 1956–57 season and scored 24 goals in 44 appearances.

Francis' best season came in 1959–60, when he was an ever-present and scored 31 goals in 48 appearances. A memorable moment in his season was scoring a hat-trick in a 4–2 victory at Loftus Road, home of West London rivals Queens Park Rangers. At the end of a lean 1960–61 season (in which Francis scored only 10 goals), the abolition of the maximum wage rule saw Francis and Towers depart the Bees. Francis scored 121 goals in 243 appearances over the course of six years in the first team at Griffin Park.

=== Queens Park Rangers ===
Francis and Towers joined Third Division club Queens Park Rangers in an £8,000 deal in May 1961. Francis failed to last long at Loftus Road and scored three goals in as many appearances before departing in October 1961.

=== Return to Brentford ===
Francis returned to Brentford in October 1961 and immediately won his place back in the team, though his 14 league goals couldn't prevent the Bees from suffering relegation to Fourth Division. He departed the club at the end of the season, having made 37 appearances and scored 15 goals during his brief return. Across his two spells with Brentford, Francis made 280 appearances, scored 136 goals and was the fourth-quickest player to reach 50 goals in all competitions for the club, behind Jack Holliday, David McCulloch and Billy Lane. He was inducted into the Brentford Hall of Fame in March 2014.

=== Gillingham ===
Francis signed for Fourth Division club Gillingham in August 1962 for a £4,000 fee. He scored 12 goals in 35 league games during the 1962–63 season, but the Gills missed out on promotion with a fifth-place finish. Five months into the season, Francis was joined by his old friend Jim Towers at the club. Though he made only 16 appearances, Francis scored seven goals during the 1963–64 season and scored the winner versus Newport County on the final day, which saw Gillingham clinch the Fourth Division championship. He departed the club at the end of the campaign, having scored 21 goals in 58 games for the Gills.

=== Non-League football ===
After his departure from Gillingham, Francis dropped into non-League football and closed out his career with spells at Southern League clubs Hastings United, Hillingdon Borough and Stevenage Town.

== Personal life ==
Francis undertook his National Service together with Jim Towers in the Royal Irish Fusiliers in Germany. After retiring from football, he became a black cab driver and held a season ticket at Stamford Bridge. Francis died on 22 October 2014 at Wexham Park Hospital in Slough, after a long battle with bowel cancer. He was 80 years old.

== Career statistics ==
Appearances and goals by club, season and competition
Club	Season	League			National cup (Note: Includes FA Cup)		League cup (Note: Includes Football League Cup, Southern League Cup)		Total	
Club	Season	Division	Apps	Goals	Apps	Goals	Apps	Goals	Apps	Goals
Brentford	1954–55	Third Division South	3	2	0	0	—		3	2
Brentford	1955–56	Third Division South	17	7	1	1	—		18	8
Brentford	1956–57	Third Division South	41	23	3	1	—		44	24
Brentford	1957–58	Third Division South	45	22	1	0	—		46	22
Brentford	1958–59	Third Division	45	22	4	2	—		49	24
Brentford	1959–60	Third Division	46	26	2	5	—		48	31
Brentford	1960–61	Third Division	31	8	2	2	2	0	35	10
Brentford	Total		228	110	13	11	2	0	243	121
Queens Park Rangers	1961–62	Third Division	2	1	—		1	2	3	3
Brentford	1961–62	Third Division	32	14	5	1	—		37	15
Gillingham	1962–63	Fourth Division	35	12	3	1	1	0	39	13
Gillingham	1963–64	Fourth Division	16	7	0	0	3	1	19	8
Gillingham	Total		51	19	3	1	4	1	58	21
Stevenage Town	1967–68	Southern League Premier Division	6	0	0	0	1	0	7	0
Career total			317	143	21	13	7	3	345	159

== Honours ==
Gillingham

- Football League Fourth Division: 1963–64

Individual

- Brentford Hall of Fame
