= Doug Rees (footballer) =

Welsh footballer

Personal information
- Full name: Douglas (Dai) Charles Rees
- Date of birth: 12 February 1923
- Place of birth: Clyne, Wales
- Date of death: 2000
- Position: Inside forward

Senior career*
Years	Team	Apps	(Gls)
1948–59	Ipswich Town	356	(1)
- * Club domestic league appearances and goals

Doug Rees (12 February 1923 – 2000) was a Welsh professional footballer. During his career he made 356 appearances for Ipswich Town in between 1948 and 1959. He was born in Clyne.

== See also ==
- List of one-club men in association football
