= Ken Moffitt =

English footballer

Personal information
- Full name: Kenneth Moffitt
- Date of birth: 2 February 1933
- Place of birth: Newcastle upon Tyne, England
- Date of death: 29 August 2016 (aged 83)
- Place of death: Newcastle upon Tyne, England
- Positions: Left back; left half

Senior career*
Years	Team	Apps	(Gls)
1950–1953	Berwick Rangers	27	(5)
1953–1955	Brentford	0	(0)
1955–1957	Berwick Rangers	14	(0)
1957–1960	Gateshead	76	(2)
- * Club domestic league appearances and goals

Kenneth Moffitt (2 February 1933 – 29 August 2016) was an English professional footballer who played in the Football League for Gateshead. A left back and left half, he also played in the Scottish League for Berwick Rangers.

== Career statistics ==
Appearances and goals by club, season and competition
Club	Season	League			National cup (Note: Includes Scottish Cup)		League cup (Note: Includes Scottish League Cup)		Total	
Club	Season	Division	Apps	Goals	Apps	Goals	Apps	Goals	Apps	Goals
Berwick Rangers	1950–51	East of Scotland League	1	0	0	0	―		1	0
Berwick Rangers	1951–52	Scottish Division C North & East	16	3	4	1	6	0	26	4
Berwick Rangers	1952–53	Scottish Division C North & East	10	2	0	0	3	0	13	2
Berwick Rangers	Total		27	5	4	1	9	0	40	6
Berwick Rangers	1955–56	Scottish Second Division	2	0	0	0	0	0	2	0
Berwick Rangers	1956–57	Scottish Second Division	12	0	0	0	6	0	18	0
Berwick Rangers	Total		41	5	4	1	15	0	60	0
Career total			41	5	4	1	15	0	60	0
