= Sonny Feehan =

Irish footballer

Personal information
- Full name: John Ignatius Feehan
- Date of birth: 17 September 1926
- Place of birth: Dublin, Ireland
- Date of death: 11 March 1995 (aged 68)
- Place of death: Ireland
- Height: 5 ft 11 in (1.80 m)
- Position: Goalkeeper

Senior career*
Years	Team	Apps	(Gls)
1942–1944	Bohemians	?	(?)
1944–1948	Waterford	?	(?)
1948–1950	Manchester United	12	(0)
1950–1952	Northampton Town	39	(0)
1954–1959	Brentford	30	(0)
1959–19??	Headington United	?	(?)
- * Club domestic league appearances and goals

John Ignatius "Sonny" Feehan (17 September 1926 – 11 March 1995) was an Irish footballer who played as a goalkeeper for several clubs in both Ireland and England.

Born in Dublin, Feehan began his football career as an amateur with Dublin-based Bohemians. He turned professional two years later, when he signed for Waterford. After four years with Waterford, he crossed the Irish Sea to England to play for Manchester United in November 1948. He was brought in as understudy to United's regular goalkeeper, Jack Crompton, and it took him a whole year to make his debut. His first appearance for the club came on 5 November 1949, keeping goal in a 6–0 home win over Huddersfield Town. An injury to Crompton later in the season afforded Feehan with an extended run in the team, including a 3–1 win over Portsmouth in an FA Cup Fifth Round replay in February 1950, but he was plagued by inconsistency and was transferred to Northampton Town in August 1950.

Feehan spent two seasons at Northampton, playing in almost 40 league matches, but he then dropped out of the game for two years before being picked up by Brentford. However, his appearances for Brentford were sporadic, making just 30 appearances in five seasons with the Bees.

Feehan died on 11 March 1995.
