= John Beale (footballer) =

English footballer

Personal information
- Full name: John Michael Beale
- Date of birth: 16 October 1930
- Place of birth: Portsmouth, England
- Date of death: September 1995 (aged 64)
- Place of death: Droxford, England
- Position: Wing half

Youth career
- –1951: Portsmouth

Senior career*
Years	Team	Apps	(Gls)
1951–1953	Portsmouth	14	(1)
- Guildford City
- * Club domestic league appearances and goals

John Michael Beale (16 October 1930 – September 1995) was an English professional footballer who played as a wing half in the Football League for Portsmouth.

== Career statistics ==
Appearances and goals by club, season and competition
Season	Club	League			FA Cup		Other		Total	
Season	Club	Division	Apps	Goals	Apps	Goals	Apps	Goals	Apps	Goals
Portsmouth	1951–52	First Division	9	0	0	0	1 (Note: Appearance in Hampshire Senior Cup)	0	10	0
Portsmouth	1952–53	First Division	5	1	0	0	—		5	1
Career total			14	1	0	0	1	0	15	1
