= Sid Tickridge =

English footballer

Personal information
- Full name: Sidney Tickridge
- Date of birth: 10 April 1923
- Place of birth: Stepney, England
- Date of death: 6 January 1997 (aged 73)
- Place of death: Canterbury, England
- Position: Full back

Senior career*
Years	Team	Apps	(Gls)
1946–1951	Tottenham Hotspur	95	(0)
1951–1952	Chelsea	61	(0)
1955–1956	Brentford	62	(0)

International career
1937	England Amateurs	3	(0)
- * Club domestic league appearances and goals

Sidney Tickridge (10 April 1923 – 6 January 1997) was a professional footballer who played for Tottenham Hotspur, Chelsea, Brentford and represented England at schoolboy level.

== Football career ==
Tickridge joined Spurs as a junior in April 1946. He played a total of 101 games in all competitions for the club in the position of full back from 1946 to 1950. Tickridge took part in the push and run side of 1950–51 when he completed one match. He left the club in March 1951 to join Chelsea in a transfer deal, and went on to make 61 appearances. He ended his senior career at Brentford and featured in 62 matches from 1955 to 1956.
