= Stan Anslow =

English footballer

Stan Thomas Anslow
Personal information
- Full name: Stanley Anslow
- Date of birth: 5 May 1931
- Place of birth: Hackney, England
- Date of death: 6 April 2017 (aged 85)
- Position: Left back

Senior career*
Years	Team	Apps	(Gls)
1951–1959	Millwall	131	(13)
- * Club domestic league appearances and goals

Stanley Thomas "Stan" Anslow (5 May 1931 in Hackney – April 2017) was an English footballer who played for Millwall in the Football League. Anslow played as a full-back.

Anslow died in April 2017, aged 85.
