= Frank Dudley (footballer) =

English footballer

Personal information
- Full name: Frank Ernest Dudley
- Date of birth: 9 May 1925
- Place of birth: Southend-on-Sea, England
- Date of death: 14 September 2012 (aged 87)
- Place of death: Southend-on-Sea, England
- Height: 5 ft 11 in (1.80 m)
- Position: Centre forward

Senior career*
| Years | Team | Apps | (Gls) |
| 1945–1949 | Southend United | 88 | (32) |
| 1949–1951 | Leeds United | 64 | (23) |
| 1951–1953 | Southampton | 67 | (32) |
| 1953 | Cardiff City | 5 | (1) |
| 1953–1958 | Brentford | 72 | (32) |
| 1958–???? | Folkestone Town | | |
- * Club domestic league appearances and goals

Frank Ernest Dudley (9 May 1925 – 14 September 2012) was an English professional footballer who played as a centre-forward for Southend United, Leeds United, Southampton, Cardiff City and Brentford. A versatile player who could play in any forward position, he scored 120 goals in 295 matches in the Football League during an eleven-year career. He was described by Jimmy Hill as "pacy, strong and gangly with a penchant for the unexpected".

== Early life ==
Born in Southend-on-Sea, Dudley worked for Holtby and Petty, a local drapers, after leaving school.

== Club career ==
As a teenager, Dudley did not pursue a career in football due to his size, standing only 5 ft 4in at the age of 15, and rarely played the game growing up. However, during his wartime service with the Royal Air Force, he entered a significant growth spurt and grew a further six inches and attended an amateur trial with Southend United in September 1945, eventually turning professional with the side the following month. He made his debut for the club in the final fixtures of the 1945–46 wartime season, scoring five times, and also appeared as a guest player for Colchester United after being stationed in the town during his war service, scoring twice in his only appearance during a 5–0 win over Barry on 9 February 1946.

When the Football League returned following the end of World War II, Dudley made his professional debut in a match against Watford and became a first-team regular at Southend Stadium. He quickly attracted attention from several sides, including Cardiff City who had considered signing Dudley when they completed the signing of his teammate Stan Montgomery in 1948. He eventually joined Leeds United in August 1949 in a player swap deal that saw Albert Wakefield move in the opposite direction. The transfer saw Dudley's weekly wage rise from seven pound per week to twelve pound and, after making his debut for the club against West Ham United on 22 August 1949, he finished his first season with the Yorkshire club as their top goalscorer, scoring 16 times in all competitions, including four goals during their run to the FA Cup quarter-finals. The following season, Dudley continued his goalscoring form, scoring eleven times during the first half of the season before Leeds manager Frank Buckley offered Dudley to Southampton in exchange for Ernie Stevenson, Dudley signing his contract with the Saints during a train journey from Leeds to London.

After initially struggling to displace Eric Day and Eddy Brown in the side, he established himself as a consistent scorer with Southampton, despite the club suffering relegation from the Second Division during the 1952–53 season. Although he suffered from a case of appendicitis during the year, he scored 14 times in 23 matches, including hat-tricks against Doncaster Rovers and Fulham. In October 1953, having been plagued by knee problems, Dudley moved to the First Division for the first time in his career, joining Cardiff City in exchange for Bobby McLaughlin. He made his debut for the Bluebirds on 24 October 1953 during a 3–0 defeat to Burnley but made just four further appearances for the club, scoring once during a 5–0 victory over Charlton Athletic, as a persistent knee injury and the signing of Welsh international Trevor Ford saw him unable to break into the first-team. He left the club after just four months to sign for Brentford.

Upon signing for the club, manager Bill Dodgin Sr. arranged for surgery to remove the cartilage from his troublesome knee. His first goal for Brentford secured an unusual feat for Dudley as his first three goals during the 1953–54 season were scored for different sides in three different divisions of the Football League, having scored in the First Division for Cardiff, the Second Division for Brentford and the Third Division for Southampton. He scored 32 goals in 72 league matches for Brentford before retiring in 1957.

== Later life ==
After retiring from playing professionally in 1956, Dudley played amateur football for local side Folkestone Town before becoming a qualified coach, working for Southend United as a youth coach between 1961 and 1965. During his later years, he became a shareholder at the club and was a season ticket holder. He began work as a clerk for the Southend Corporation in 1958 and also worked for the Southend cemeteries and cremation department for over two decades before retiring in 1985. He died on 14 September 2012 at the age of 87.
