= James Robertson (footballer, born 1929) =

Scottish footballer

Personal information
- Full name: James Wright Robertson
- Date of birth: 20 February 1929
- Place of birth: Falkirk, Scotland
- Date of death: 11 June 2015 (aged 86)
- Position: Winger

Youth career
- Dunipace Thistle
- 1948–1951: Arsenal

Senior career*
| Years | Team | Apps | (Gls) |
| 1951–1953 | Arsenal | 1 | (0) |
| 1953–1956 | Brentford | 84 | (14) |
- Gravesend & Northfleet
| Total | | 85 | (14) |
- * Club domestic league appearances and goals

James Wright Robertson (20 February 1929 – 11 June 2015) was a Scottish professional footballer who played as a winger.

== Career ==
Robertson joined Arsenal in 1948, making one appearance for them in the 1951–52 season. He later played for Brentford, before playing non-league football with Gravesend & Northfleet.
