= George Stobbart (footballer) =

English footballer

Personal information
- Full name: George Campbell Stobbart
- Date of birth: 9 January 1921
- Place of birth: Morpeth, England
- Date of death: 23 January 1995 (aged 74)
- Place of death: North Tyneside, England
- Position: Inside forward

Youth career
- –1940: Netherfield

Senior career*
Years	Team	Apps	(Gls)
1940–1946	Middlesbrough	0	(0)
1946–1949	Newcastle United	66	(21)
1949–1952	Luton Town	107	(30)
1952–1954	Millwall	68	(27)
1954–1956	Brentford	57	(17)
1956–1957	Bedford Town	50	(18)
- Dartford
- * Club domestic league appearances and goals

George Stobbart (9 January 1921, in Morpeth, Northumberland – 23 January 1995) was an English footballer who played for Middlesbrough, Newcastle United, Luton Town, Millwall and Brentford during his career. As of October 2015 he is Brentford's quickest-ever goalscorer, having netted after just ten seconds of a Division Three (South) match versus Aldershot in November 1954.

== Playing career ==
Stobbart started his career at Netherfield before moving to Middlesbrough during the Second World War. During the war, he was Middlesbrough's top goalscorer, scoring 125 goals in 168 games. After the war, he failed to maintain his place and in 1946 moved to Newcastle United for £4,650, having failed to make a competitive appearance for Middlesbrough, though he did make two appearances in the expanded 1945–46 FA Cup.

At Newcastle, he made an instant impact, scoring twice on his debut in their 3–1 home victory over Coventry City, but lost his place a few months later. He would eventually go on to score 21 goals in 66 league appearances playing up front and on the right wing.

He stayed at Newcastle for three seasons before moving on to Luton Town, where he would make the more appearances than any of his other clubs over the next three years. Again, he moved on, this time to Millwall and two seasons later to Brentford. He finished his career in non-league football with spells at Southern League sides Bedford Town and Dartford.

== Personal life ==
While living in his native northeast, Stobbart worked as a miner and later ran a pub in Brentford.
