= Loughborough College =

English college

Coordinates: 52.7680°N 1.2198°W

Location
- Radmoor Road; Loughborough, Leicestershire; England

Information
- Type: General FE
- Established: 1909
- Educational authority: Leicestershire
- Department for Education URN: 130748 Tables
- Ofsted: Reports
- Principal: Corrie Harris
- Website: www.loucoll.ac.uk

Loughborough College is a large general further education college in the market town of Loughborough, Leicestershire, England. It provides both further education (FE) and higher education (HE) courses on a single campus.

The college offers a broad curriculum, including academic A-levels, T-level technical courses, vocational diplomas, apprenticeships, and some degree-level programmes. The college annually enrols over 10,000 students in full-time, part-time and distance-learning courses.

Loughborough College is known for its strong sports-related programmes and close links with Loughborough University, and its students are eligible to join Loughborough Students’ Union as part of their course.

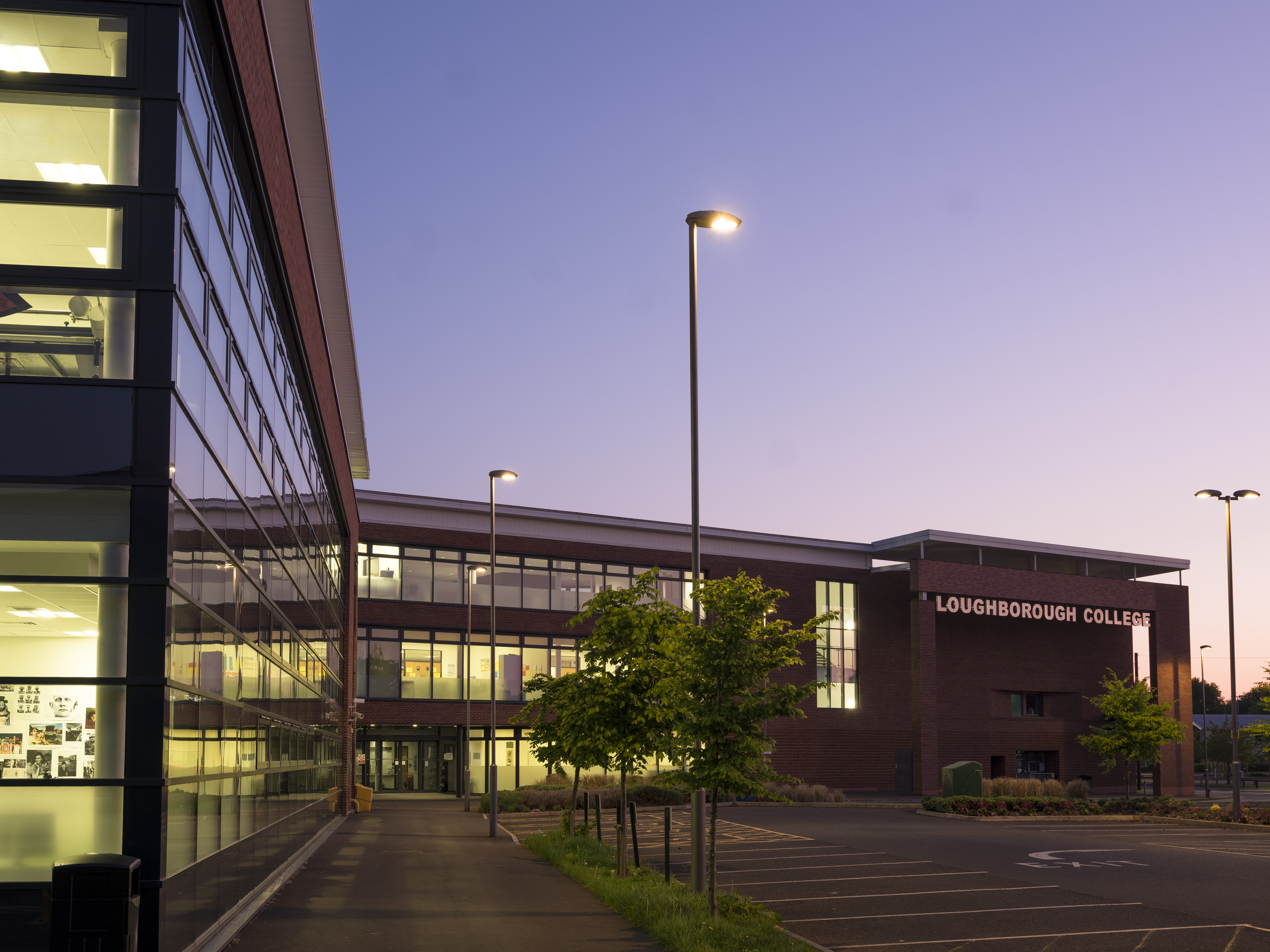
Loughborough College Hub Building from Radmoor Road

== History ==
Loughborough College traces its origins to 1909 when Leicestershire County Council established Loughborough Technical Institute to provide local further education facilities. By 1920, it had been renamed Loughborough College and had gained an international reputation for pioneering vocational teaching and qualifications. Under principal Herbert Schofield, the college expanded in the interwar years and laid the foundations of the present campus.

The original institution was divided into separate branches – including a Teacher Training College, an Art College, a College of Technology, and a continuation of the technical institute as a further education college. The Loughborough College of Technology later evolved into Loughborough University (chartered in 1966), while the further education provision continued under Loughborough College.

Following the Further and Higher Education Act 1992, Loughborough College became an independent corporation in 1993, among the first institutions to join the newly incorporated FE sector in England. The college has grown and modernised its facilities while maintaining its original vocational and technical education focus.

In 2012, Loughborough College, in partnership with the National Space Centre, launched the UK’s first full-time post-16 Space Engineering programme – a unique course blending A-levels with an engineering diploma. This innovative programme earned national recognition when the college received a Queen’s Anniversary Prize (Round 15, 2023) for its “world-class space engineering programme”. Today, Loughborough College remains an integral part of the town’s distinguished educational quarter, operating adjacent to Loughborough University.

== Academic Programmes ==
=== Further Education ===
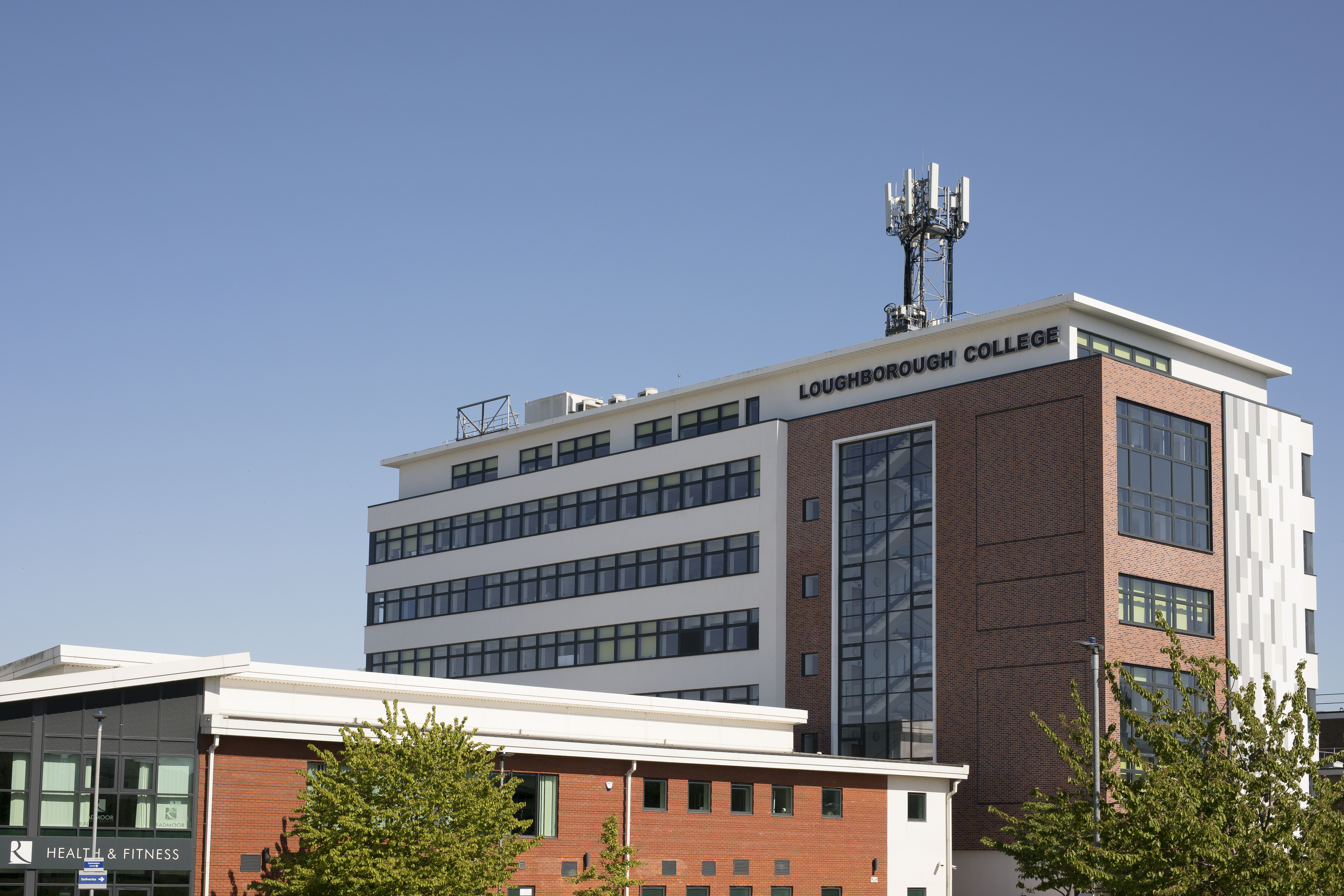
Loughborough College S Block building

Loughborough College offers many FE courses for school leavers and adult learners. It has a large sixth-form centre that provides A-levels in subjects from sciences and humanities to art. The college has also been an early adopter of T Levels (the two-year technical programmes introduced in England), with courses in areas like digital production, engineering, business, education, and health.

Vocational programmes (BTECs, NVQs and diplomas) are available from Level 1 to Level 3 across disciplines such as engineering, electrical installation, hair & beauty, hospitality, public services, sport, and others. At the time of a 2023 inspection, around 4,000 students aged 16–18 were enrolled on FE programmes, with the majority pursuing vocational courses or mixed study programmes. The college also provides adult education in areas like Access to Higher Education, English for Speakers of Other Languages (ESOL), and professional qualifications.

In addition, Loughborough College delivers apprenticeships from Level 2 up to Level 5 in partnership with employers, with about 800 apprentices on its rolls (in fields ranging from engineering to care and management).

=== Higher Education ===
Alongside FE, Loughborough College offers higher education courses, including foundation degrees, HNC/Ds, and complete bachelor’s degrees, often in vocational subjects. These programmes are typically run in collaboration with partner universities for validation. Degrees are validated by either Loughborough University, the University of Derby, or Sheffield Hallam University.

Subject areas for HE include sports science, engineering, business and management, among others. The college’s higher education provision has been recognised for quality: in the Teaching Excellence Framework (TEF) review of 2023, Loughborough College earned an Overall Silver rating, with a Gold rating specifically for student experience. This indicates that the student learning experience and outcomes at the college’s HE centre were judged to be of very high quality.

The college prides itself on smaller class sizes and industry-focused teaching in its degree courses. It reports that many of its graduates progress into employment or further study within six months.

In sports education, the college is also a hub for elite young athletes: it runs sports academies and works with programmes like TASS (Talented Athlete Scholarship Scheme) to help student-athletes balance training with study. Many athletes enrolled at the college have gone on to compete internationally, aided by the college’s flexible academic support.

=== Apprenticeships ===
The college offers apprenticeships for students who wish to gain practical skills in a working environment whilst earning a wage.

=== Professional Qualifications ===
Many of the courses are offered in association with the Association of Accounting Technicians (AAT), Chartered Institute of Marketing (CIM) and the Chartered Management Institute (CMI).

== Facilities ==
Loughborough College is situated in Loughborough’s higher education campus area, directly adjacent to Loughborough University. The college shares some amenities with the university and benefits from a close relationship – notably, all Loughborough College students can become members of Loughborough Students’ Union, giving them access to clubs, societies, and sports facilities.

A central hub building houses student services, a library, and social spaces, while specialised facilities support the various vocational curricula. For example, the college has dedicated engineering workshops and science laboratories equipped with industry-standard technology (such as jet engine test rigs and programmable logic controllers) for hands-on learning.

Sports students have access to a state-of-the-art sports science laboratory and a strength and conditioning suite aligned with professional standards. There is also a Sports Hall/Gym, and as of 2024, the college was constructing a new specialist sports training facility on campus to enhance further its sports education provision, set to open in 2025.

A notable feature is the Radmoor Centre, which serves as the college’s on-site commercial and community facility. The Radmoor Centre includes training salons for hairdressing and beauty therapy and a public-facing restaurant, allowing hospitality students to gain real-world experience.

The campus has multiple eateries (cafés and canteens), a student refectory, and a student common room and shop. For students with childcare needs, the college operates the Radmoor Nursery – a full-day childcare facility open to students, staff, and the public, which received a positive Ofsted report in 2023.

Loughborough College provides accommodation for students who need to live on campus, particularly those enrolled in specialist programmes. The college’s primary residential site is The Gables, a halls of residence located on Epinal Way. Ofsted has consistently praised the Gables accommodation; in a 2025 social care inspection of residential provision, Loughborough College was rated “Outstanding” for the quality of its student accommodation and support services.

Inspectors noted the excellent individual care and safeguarding provided to residential students, many pursuing demanding sporting and academic schedules. This reflects the college’s commitment to a supportive environment. Additional student support facilities on campus include counselling services, learning support for those with special educational needs, and career guidance centres.

== Partnerships and Collaborations ==
Loughborough College has developed numerous partnerships locally, nationally, and internationally, which enhance its offerings and reputation.

Chief among these is its close collaboration with Loughborough University. While the college and the university are separate institutions, they share a synergistic relationship. The physical proximity (the college is across the road from the main university campus) and shared student union membership integrate college students into the wider Loughborough student community. Many college alumni progress to Loughborough University for higher studies, and some college higher education courses have historically been validated by the university. The two institutions also cooperate on sporting initiatives, taking advantage of Loughborough’s world-renowned sports facilities.

The college maintains formal academic partnerships with other universities to validate its degree programmes. Notably, it is an affiliate college of the University of Derby, which validates several of Loughborough’s foundation and honours degree courses. Similarly, the college partners with Sheffield Hallam University for specific programmes, leveraging Hallam’s recognition (Hallam was named University of the Year for Teaching Quality 2020) to ensure high standards in curriculum design. These partnerships mean students can study for university awards while remaining at Loughborough College. In 2024, the college further expanded its academic collaborations by becoming a founding partner of the East Midlands Institute of Technology (EMIoT) – a consortium with Loughborough University, the University of Derby, and Derby College Group.

The EMIoT focuses on advanced technical education in fields such as engineering, digital technology, construction, and leadership, enabling students to progress from new T Levels and Higher Technical Qualifications up to degrees and postgraduate programmes offered across the partner institutions. In May 2025, a dedicated Institute of Technology facility on the college campus opened to support this collaboration with specialised laboratories and teaching spaces.

The college is also a corporate member of the Chartered Institution for Further Education a status granted by Royal Charter to recognise quality and innovation in FE colleges.

In terms of specialist training collaborations, Loughborough College works closely with sector-specific academies. It joined with the National Space Academy (based at the National Space Centre in Leicester) to deliver the unique Space Engineering course for sixth-formers.

Another high-profile collaboration is with the NFL Academy. Since 2022, the NFL (National Football League) has operated an elite development academy for American football at Loughborough. The NFL Academy’s UK campus is hosted at Loughborough’s sports facilities in partnership with Loughborough College and University, combining full-time education with intensive American football training for 16–19-year-olds. This programme attracts student-athletes from around the world to study at Loughborough College while training under NFL coaches, with the goal of securing college scholarships or professional opportunities in the US.

Locally, Loughborough College partners with schools, employers, and community organisations. It works with Sense College in Loughborough to provide inclusive further education opportunities for young people with disabilities, sharing expertise and facilities to support learners with special needs. The college has links with numerous employers (over 1,800 employer partners) for its apprenticeship and work placement schemes.

During the COVID-19 pandemic, Loughborough College co-launched a “Keep Kids Active” campaign with local sports figures (including alumni from Leicester City Football Club) to encourage youth fitness. It is also part of national college networks and initiatives – for example, it was designated an AoC Sport Inclusion Hub, reflecting its role in promoting inclusive sports participation in further education.

These partnerships and collaborative projects help the college enhance its curriculum, provide real-world opportunities for students, and contribute to the community. They also bolster the college’s profile, with programmes like the NFL Academy and Space Academy distinguishing Loughborough College on a national stage.

== Notable alumni ==
Over its long history, Loughborough College has educated many individuals who have gone on to prominence in diverse fields, especially in sport. Notable alumni include:

- Jude Bellingham – Professional footballer for Real Madrid and England. Bellingham studied for a BTEC Diploma in Sport at Loughborough College as a teenager while beginning his football career, completing the course via distance learning.
- Katie Boulter – British professional tennis player. Boulter studied at Loughborough College from 2013 to 2016, during which she balanced her academic studies with her tennis training. She has represented Great Britain in the Billie Jean King Cup and competed in Grand Slam tournaments, including Wimbledon. Boulter became British No.1 in the WTA rankings in 2023.
- Harvey Barnes – Professional footballer for Newcastle United and former Leicester City player. Barnes attended Loughborough College during his youth development.
- Nicola White – Olympic gold medallist and England international hockey player. White graduated from Loughborough College in 2013 with a BSc in Applied Sports Science. She was part of the Great Britain women’s team that won gold at the Rio 2016 Olympics and bronze at London 2012. White has earned over 180 caps for England and Great Britain and has won multiple medals at European and Commonwealth competitions.
- Amy Cokayne – England women’s rugby union player. Cokayne moved back to the UK from New Zealand as a teenager and enrolled at Loughborough College, where she completed a degree in Sports Science while launching her rugby career.
- Thomas Young – Paralympic sprinter and gold medallist. Young, who has cerebral palsy, studied Sports Coaching at Loughborough College and trained in Loughborough’s athletics hub. He won the T38 100m gold at the Tokyo 2020 Paralympics. In 2022, he was named the UK’s Disabled Sportsperson of the Year in college sport and received an MBE for services to athletics.
- Steph Houghton – Former captain of the England women's national football team. Houghton earned a BSc in Sports Science from Loughborough College between 2007 and 2010. She has played professionally for Sunderland, Leeds United, Arsenal and Manchester City Women.
- Doug Scott – Mountaineer and adventurer. Scott attended Loughborough Teachers’ Training College (the teacher-training branch of Loughborough College) from 1959–61.
- Harry Aikines-Aryeetey – athletics
- Andrew Barnard – cricket
- Mason Bennett – football
- Sophie Bradley – football
- Rachel Bragg – volleyball
- Karen Carney – football
- Ben Chilwell – football
- Elise Christie – short track skating
- Libby Clegg – athletics
- James Dasaolu – athletics
- Toni Duggan – football
- Harry Ellis – rugby union
- Daniel Fogg – swimming
- Carl Froch – boxing
- Phil Gilchrist – football
- Robbie Grabarz – athletics
- Sophie Hahn – athletics
- Lucy Hall – triathlon
- Fran Halsall – swimming
- Jeff Hendrick – football
- Tom Huddlestone – football
- Sam Ingram – judo
- Andy King – football
- Charlie Matthews – rugby union
- Melanie Nocher – swimming
- Roberto Pavoni – swimming
- Leon Rattigan – wrestling
- Jemma Reekie – middle-distance runner. Voted Athletics Weekly 'Women's British Athlete of the Year 2020'
- Joe Roebuck – swimming
- Tom Rogic – football
- Martyn Rooney – athletics
- Jeffrey Schlupp – football
- Sarah Stevenson – taekwondo
- Bradly Sinden – taekwondo
- Liam Tancock – swimming
- Sophie Thornhill - paracycling
- Keely Hodgkinson - athletics

== See also ==
- Loughborough
- Loughborough University
- Loughborough Students' Union
