= 1958–59 Brentford F.C. season =

English football team season

Brentford
1958–59 season
- Chairman: Frank Davis
- Manager: Malky MacDonald
- Stadium: Griffin Park
- Third Division: 3rd
- FA Cup: Fourth round
- Top goalscorer: League: Towers (32); All: Towers (37)
- Highest home attendance: 28,725
- Lowest home attendance: 9,432
- Average home league attendance: 13,924
Home colours

During the 1958–59 English football season, Brentford competed in the Football League Third Division. Despite 32 goals from Jim Towers and 22 from George Francis, a number of defeats to low-placed clubs early in the season prevented the Bees from finishing higher than 3rd, one place away from promotion.

== Season summary ==
After narrowly missing out on promotion in 1957–58, Brentford entered the 1958–59 Third Division season full of confidence. Despite making a profit of £6,789 on the previous season (equivalent to £200,300 in 2023), manager Malky MacDonald decided not to add to his squad and instead planned for the future by bringing in a number of Scottish youngsters. Brentford began the season with a resounding 4–0 victory over Bradford City, hitting top spot, but dropped back after three consecutive defeats. By the time the Bees drew 1–1 with Chesterfield on 4 October 1958, the team's inconsistency could be clearly pointed to a lack of support for forwards Jim Towers and George Francis, who had scored 13 of the team's 17 goals by that point of the season. In response, manager MacDonald paid £6,000 for Luton Town's outside left George McLeod. After defeats to Stockport County and Reading in late October, the team recovered and began to perform on a consistent basis.

Brentford had a morale-boosting run to the fourth round of the FA Cup, eliminating Exeter City, King's Lynn and Barnsley on the way to a 2–0 defeat to First Division club West Bromwich Albion in front of 41,440 at The Hawthorns. A 6–0 win over Southampton at The Dell on 9 March 1959 (which set a new club record for biggest away Football League win) established the Bees as promotion contenders. Three victories and two draws from the following five matches (which included a win and a draw versus leaders Plymouth Argyle) saw Brentford increase their grip on 3rd place in the table, though at a cost to season-ending injuries to Ian Dargie and Len Newcombe. Defeats in crucial matches versus fellow promotion challengers Norwich City and Hull City in early April effectively ended the Bees' promotion charge and all hope of promotion mathematically ended with two matches left to play. Brentford finished the season in 3rd place.

Jim Towers' 37 goals scored in all competitions during the season was just two goals shy of Jack Holliday's club record of 39, set in the Third Division South in 1932–33. Towers' strike partner George Francis also finished amongst the top scorers in the Third Division, with 22 goals and 24 in all competitions. Brentford finished the 1958–59 season with the best defensive record in the Third Division, conceding only 49 goals and also conceding the fewest away goals (27). A new club record for most league away draws (10) was set during the season and the club record for fewest goalscorers in a season was equalled. The 20 players used in all competitions was the lowest since the end of the Second World War and three players finishing the season as ever-presents in all 50 matches was another post-war record.

== League table ==
Pos	Team	Pld	W	D	L	GF	GA	GAv	Pts	Promotion or relegation
1	Plymouth Argyle (C, P)	46	23	16	7	89	59	1.508	62	Promotion to the Second Division
2	Hull City (P)	46	26	9	11	90	55	1.636	61	Promotion to the Second Division
3	Brentford	46	21	15	10	76	49	1.551	57	
4	Norwich City	46	22	13	11	89	62	1.435	57	
5	Colchester United	46	21	10	15	71	67	1.060	52	

(C) Champions; (P) Promoted

== Results ==
Brentford's goal tally listed first.

=== Legend ===
Win	Draw	Loss

=== Friendlies ===
Date	Opponent	Venue	Result	Attendance	Scorer(s)
21 October 1958	Celtic	H	2–0	11,000	n/a

=== Football League Third Division ===
No.	Date	Opponent	Venue	Result	Attendance	Scorer(s)
1	25 August 1958	Bradford City	H	4–0	15,749	Towers (2), Francis (2)
2	28 August 1958	Doncaster Rovers	A	0–1	10,654	
3	30 August 1958	Wrexham	A	1–2	16,905	Towers
4	2 September 1958	Doncaster Rovers	H	0–1	14,845	
5	6 September 1958	Southampton	H	2–0	12,997	Francis, Towers
6	9 September 1958	Mansfield Town	H	2–0	13,625	Towers (2)
7	12 September 1958	Accrington Stanley	A	1–1	9,918	Rainford
8	15 September 1958	Mansfield Town	A	1–1	9,159	Towers
9	20 September 1958	Halifax Town	H	2–0	12,643	Francis, Heath
10	22 September 1958	Hull City	A	1–3	14,172	Heath
11	27 September 1958	Newport County	A	1–0	8,220	Francis
12	30 September 1958	Hull City	H	1–1	12,441	Towers
13	4 October 1958	Chesterfield	H	1–1	12,473	Heath
14	9 October 1958	Notts County	A	0–0	4,381	
15	11 October 1958	Tranmere Rovers	A	2–1	12,325	Towers, Rainford
16	18 October 1958	Stockport County	H	1–4	12,488	Towers
17	25 October 1958	Reading	A	1–3	16,186	Towers
18	1 November 1958	Colchester United	H	2–1	11,945	Towers, Heath
19	8 November 1958	Bournemouth & Boscombe Athletic	A	0–0	11,564	
20	22 November 1958	Queens Park Rangers	A	2–1	13,784	Drinkwater (og), Towers
21	29 November 1958	Bury	H	0–0	11,741	
22	13 December 1958	Rochdale	H	2–1	9,432	Towers, Dargie
23	20 December 1958	Bradford City	A	0–3	11,473	
24	25 December 1958	Swindon Town	H	2–2	12,504	McLeod, Francis
25	26 December 1958	Swindon Town	A	1–1	12,690	Francis
26	3 January 1959	Wrexham	H	2–1	11,723	Francis (2)
27	31 January 1959	Accrington Stanley	H	2–1	11,260	Francis, Towers
28	7 February 1959	Halifax Town	A	0–0	4,654	
29	14 February 1959	Newport County	H	3–0	10,392	McLeod, Bristow, Towers
30	21 February 1959	Chesterfield	A	2–1	9,649	Francis, Towers (pen)
31	28 February 1959	Tranmere Rovers	H	5–2	13,138	Towers (2), Francis, Rainford (2)
32	7 March 1959	Stockport County	A	1–1	7,973	Towers (pen)
33	9 March 1959	Southampton	A	6–0	7,756	McLeod, Towers (4), Francis
34	14 March 1959	Reading	H	3–1	18,209	Francis (2), Rainford
35	21 March 1959	Colchester United	A	4–0	8,775	Francis (2), McLeod, Towers
36	27 March 1959	Plymouth Argyle	H	3–0	28,725	Towers, Rainford, Francis
37	28 March 1959	Bournemouth & Boscombe Athletic	H	1–1	15,970	McLeod
38	30 March 1959	Plymouth Argyle	A	1–1	27,073	Parsons
39	4 April 1959	Norwich City	A	1–4	27,870	Francis
40	8 April 1959	Southend United	A	0–2	9,022	
41	11 April 1959	Queens Park Rangers	H	1–0	15,905	Rainford
42	18 April 1959	Bury	A	1–1	7,092	Towers
43	21 April 1959	Notts County	H	4–0	11,738	Francis, Towers (3, 2 pens)
44	25 April 1959	Southend United	H	6–1	11,264	Rainford, Francis (2), Towers (2), Williamson (og)
45	27 April 1959	Rochdale	A	0–0	2,191	
46	30 April 1959	Norwich City	H	0–4	19,035	

=== FA Cup ===
Round	Date	Opponent	Venue	Result	Attendance	Scorer(s)	Notes
1R	15 November 1958	Exeter City	H	3–2	14,600	Towers, Francis, Rainford	(Note: Both teams wore change colours.)
2R	6 December 1958	King's Lynn	H	3–1	14,100	Towers (3)	
3R	10 January 1959	Barnsley	H	2–0	16,890	Towers, Francis	
4R	24 January 1959	West Bromwich Albion	A	0–2	41,440		

- Sources: 100 Years Of Brentford, Statto, 11v11

== Playing squad ==
Players' ages are as of the opening day of the 1958–59 season.

Pos.	Name	Nat.	Date of birth (age)	Signed from	Signed in	Notes
Goalkeepers						
GK	Gerry Cakebread	(England)	1 April 1936 (aged 22)	Youth	1954	
GK	Sonny Feehan	(Republic of Ireland)	17 September 1926 (aged 31)	Northampton Town	1954	
Defenders
DF	Ken Horne	(England)	25 June 1926 (aged 32)	Blackpool	1950	
DF	Tom Wilson (c)	(England)	3 July 1930 (aged 28)	Fulham	1957	
Midfielders
HB	George Bristow	(England)	25 June 1933 (aged 25)	Youth	1950	
HB	Ken Coote	(England)	19 May 1928 (aged 30)	Wembley	1949	
HB	Ian Dargie	(England)	3 October 1931 (aged 26)	Tonbridge	1952	
HB	Billy Goundry	(England)	28 March 1934 (aged 24)	Huddersfield Town	1955	
HB	Ron Peplow	(England)	4 May 1935 (aged 23)	Southall	1955	
HB	Sid Russell	(England)	4 October 1937 (aged 20)	Jolly X	1956	
Forwards
FW	John Caven	(Scotland)	6 July 1934 (aged 24)	Kilmarnock	1957	
FW	George Francis	(England)	4 February 1934 (aged 24)	Youth	1955	
FW	Johnny Hales	(Scotland)	15 May 1940 (aged 18)	St Roch's	1958	
FW	Dennis Heath	(England)	28 September 1934 (aged 23)	Youth	1954	
FW	Billy Horn	(Scotland)	13 May 1938 (aged 20)	Kilmarnock	1958	Amateur
FW	George McLeod	(Scotland)	30 November 1932 (aged 25)	Luton Town	1958	
FW	Len Newcombe	(Wales)	28 February 1931 (aged 27)	Fulham	1956	
FW	Eric Parsons	(England)	9 November 1923 (aged 34)	Chelsea	1956	
FW	Johnny Rainford	(England)	11 December 1930 (aged 27)	Cardiff City	1953	
FW	Jim Towers	(England)	15 April 1933 (aged 25)	Youth	1954	

- Sources: 100 Years Of Brentford, Timeless Bees

== Coaching staff ==
Name	Role
(Scotland) Malky MacDonald	Manager
(England) Fred Monk	Trainer
(England) Jack Holliday	Assistant Trainer

== Statistics ==
=== Appearances and goals ===

Brentford's highest appearance-makers in each position during the Football League season.

Pos	Nat	Name	League		FA Cup		Total	
Pos	Nat	Name	Apps	Goals	Apps	Goals	Apps	Goals
GK	(England)	Gerry Cakebread	45	0	4	0	49	0
GK	(Republic of Ireland)	Sonny Feehan	1	0	0	0	1	0
DF	(England)	Ken Horne	45	0	3	0	48	0
DF	(England)	Tom Wilson	46	0	4	0	50	0
HB	(England)	George Bristow	37	1	4	0	41	1
HB	(England)	Ken Coote	44	0	4	0	48	0
HB	(England)	Ian Dargie	37	1	4	0	41	1
HB	(England)	Billy Goundry	12	0	1	0	13	0
HB	(England)	Ron Peplow	7	0	0	0	7	0
HB	(England)	Sid Russell	2	0	0	0	2	0
FW	(Scotland)	John Caven	1	0	0	0	1	0
FW	(England)	George Francis	45	22	4	2	49	24
FW	(Scotland)	Johnny Hales	1	0	0	0	1	0
FW	(England)	Dennis Heath	25	4	4	0	29	4
FW	(Scotland)	Billy Horn	1	0	0	0	1	0
FW	(Scotland)	George McLeod	29	5	4	0	33	5
FW	(Wales)	Len Newcombe	2	0	0	0	2	0
FW	(England)	Eric Parsons	34	1	0	0	34	1
FW	(England)	Johnny Rainford	46	8	4	1	50	9
FW	(England)	Jim Towers	46	32	4	5	50	37

- Players listed in italics left the club mid-season.
- Source: 100 Years Of Brentford

=== Goalscorers ===
Pos.	Nat	Player	FL3	FAC	Total
FW	(England)	Jim Towers	32	5	37
FW	(England)	George Francis	22	2	24
FW	(England)	Johnny Rainford	8	1	9
FW	(Scotland)	George McLeod	5	0	5
FW	(England)	Dennis Heath	4	0	4
HB	(England)	George Bristow	1	0	1
HB	(England)	Ian Dargie	1	0	1
FW	(England)	Eric Parsons	1	0	1
Opponents			2	0	2
Total			76	8	84

- Players listed in italics left the club mid-season.
- Source: 100 Years Of Brentford

=== Management ===
Name	Nat	From	To	Record All Comps					Record League				
Name	Nat	From	To	P	W	D	L	W %	P	W	D	L	W %
Malky MacDonald	(Scotland)	25 August 1958	30 April 1959	50	24	15	11	48.00	46	21	15	10	45.65

=== Summary ===
Games played	50 (46 Third Division, 4 FA Cup)
Games won	24 (21 Third Division, 3 FA Cup)
Games drawn	15 (15 Third Division, 0 FA Cup)
Games lost	11 (10 Third Division, 1 FA Cup)
Goals scored	84 (76 Third Division, 8 FA Cup)
Goals conceded	54 (49 Third Division, 5 FA Cup)
Clean sheets	17 (16 Third Division, 1 FA Cup)
Biggest league win	6–0 versus Southampton, 9 March 1959
Worst league defeat	4–0 versus Norwich City, 30 April 1959
Most appearances	50, Johnny Rainford, Tom Wilson (46 Third Division, 4 FA Cup)
Top scorer (league)	32, Jim Towers
Top scorer (all competitions)	37, Jim Towers

== Transfers & loans ==
Players transferred in
Date	Pos.	Name	Previous club	Fee	Ref.
August 1958	HB	(Scotland) Jimmy Lafferty	n/a	n/a	
6 September 1958	HB	(Scotland) Charlie McInally	(Scotland) St Roch's	n/a	
September 1958	FW	(Scotland) Johnny Hales	(Scotland) St Roch's	n/a	
25 October 1958	FW	(Scotland) Billy Horn	(Scotland) Kilmarnock	Amateur	
October 1958	FW	(Scotland) George McLeod	(England) Luton Town	£6,000	
1958	DF	(England) Peter Gelson	n/a	n/a	
10 January 1959	FW	(Scotland) George Summers	(Scotland) Shawfield	n/a	
Players transferred out
Date	Pos.	Name	Subsequent club	Fee	Ref.
December 1958	HB	(England) Len Roe	(England) Yiewsley	n/a	
Players released
Date	Pos.	Name	Subsequent club	Join date	Ref.
May 1959	DF	(England) Alan Bassham	(England) Folkestone Town	1959	
May 1959	FW	(Scotland) John Caven	n/a	n/a	
May 1959	FW	(Republic of Ireland) Sonny Feehan	(England) Headington United	1959	
May 1959	FW	(Republic of Ireland) Christy Fletcher	(England) Peterborough United	1959	
May 1959	FW	(Scotland) Billy Horn	(Scotland) Kilmarnock	1959	
May 1959	DF	(England) George Lowden	(England) Hounslow Town	n/a	
