= John Caven (footballer) =

Scottish footballer (born 1934)

Personal information
- Full name: John Caven
- Date of birth: 6 July 1934 (age 92)
- Place of birth: Edinburgh, Scotland
- Position: Outside left

Senior career*
Years	Team	Apps	(Gls)
–1957	Penicuik Athletic		
1957	Kilmarnock	3	(1)
1957–1959	Brentford	7	(1)
1960	Chelmsford City	2	(0)
- Vale of Leithen
- Chirnside United
- Eyemouth United
- Hawick Royal Albert
- * Club domestic league appearances and goals

John Caven (born 6 July 1934) was a Scottish professional footballer who played as an outside left in the Football League for Brentford. He began his career in Scotland with Kilmarnock.

== Club career ==
Caven began his career Penicuik Athletic, before transferring to Scottish League First Division club Kilmarnock in February 1957. He made three appearances and scoring one goal during what remained of the 1956–57 season and left the club at the end of the campaign. Caven followed former Kilmarnock manager Malky McDonald down to England in October 1957 and transferred to Third Division South club Brentford. Behind forwards Johnny Rainford, George Francis and Jim Towers in the pecking order, Caven's career with the Bees never got going and he made just seven appearances, scoring one goal, before departing Griffin Park at the end of the 1958–59 season. After his release from Brentford, Caven dropped into non-League football and had a spell with Southern League Premier Division club Chelmsford City in 1960.

== Career statistics ==
Appearances and goals by club, season and competition
Club	Season	League			National cup (Note: Includes Scottish Cup, FA Cup)		League cup (Note: Includes Scottish League Cup)		Total	
Club	Season	Division	Apps	Goals	Apps	Goals	Apps	Goals	Apps	Goals
Kilmarnock	1956–57	Scottish First Division	3	1	0	0	0	0	3	1
Brentford	1957–58	Third Division South	6	1	0	0	—		6	1
Brentford	1958–59	Third Division	1	0	0	0	—		1	0
Brentford	Total		7	1	0	0	—		7	1
Career total			10	2	0	0	0	0	10	2
