= 1957–58 Brentford F.C. season =

English football team season

Brentford
1957–58 season
- Chairman: Frank Davis
- Manager: Malky MacDonald
- Stadium: Griffin Park
- Third Division South: 2nd
- FA Cup: First round
- Top goalscorer: League: Towers (29); All: Towers (29)
- Highest home attendance: 25,744
- Lowest home attendance: 9,130
- Average home league attendance: 13,084
Home colours

During the 1957–58 English football season, Brentford competed in the Football League Third Division South. The Bees finished as runners-up to Brighton & Hove Albion and narrowly missed out on promotion to the Second Division.

== Season summary ==
After the departure of Bill Dodgin Sr, Brentford recruited Kilmarnock manager Malky MacDonald for their vacant managerial position in May 1957. MacDonald was no stranger to Griffin Park, having spent just under three years as a player-coach with the Bees between 1946 and 1949. First on MacDonald's list of priorities was to ensure that Brentford finished in the top half of the Third Division South table, to avoid becoming founder members of the new Fourth Division in the following season. Ageing and injury-ravaged players Sid Tickridge, Wally Bragg and Frank Dudley were released, while Jeff Taylor, the club's second-leading scorer in each of the previous two seasons, elected to retire and pursue a career in opera. MacDonald recruited former Brentford player Fred Monk as trainer and made just one signing of note, full back Tom Wilson from Fulham, whom he named captain. Ken Horne, Ian Dargie and Johnny Rainford (three players who had seen their playing time reduced under previous manager Dodgin) would be regulars again under MacDonald during the season.

After a mixed start to the season, an unbeaten run of six wins in eight matches in October and November elevated Brentford to 2nd place on 23 November 1957. The run included a new club record of seven consecutive clean sheets. Forwards Jim Towers and George Francis were in prolific form and had scored 24 of the Bees' 37 league goals at that point of the season. After a dip around the turn of the year, Brentford clawed their way back to the higher reaches of the Third Division South table and won six matches in a row in March and early April to move up to 4th. A 1–0 defeat to Torquay United on 7 April put Brentford four points behind leaders Brighton & Hove Albion, with the Bees having played one game more. The damage of draws in the following two matches (versus Southampton and a showdown with Brighton & Hove Albion) was lessened by fellow challengers Plymouth Argyle, Swindon Town and Reading all dropping points.

The Bees, spurred on by six goals from Jim Towers, won their final three matches of the season versus Reading, Port Vale and leaders Brighton & Hove Albion. The victory over Brighton put Brentford top on 58 points, ahead of Plymouth Argyle and Brighton on goal average. Brighton could still win the title by virtue of their game in hand, which would come versus Watford two days later, whom they had beaten 1–0 at Vicarage Road two days before their match at Griffin Park. Brighton emphatically beat Watford 6–0 in their final match to win promotion to the Second Division, but the manner of their victories over Watford raised concern and the referee of the first meeting between the clubs wrote to the Football League outlining his suspicions. It wasn't until October 1960 that former Brighton & Hove Albion wing half Glen Wilson revealed to the Daily Mail that some of the Watford players had agreed to "lie down" in exchange for money. Looking back in 2010, Brentford full back Ken Horne summarised the situation:

Jimmy Bowie, a betting man, went to Watford and said (so he claimed) we can offer you money to go out and beat Brighton for us. Jimmy named his price and got told – "We get more than that for losing to Brighton". There was a lot of trouble after that match with the Watford captain. There was a lad making his debut for Brighton and Meadows, who was captain of Watford and who Jimmy had spoken to, was marking him. This lad was making his debut and scored five goals...in the first half.

== League table ==
Pos	Team	Pld	W	D	L	GF	GA	GAv	Pts	Promotion or relegation
1	Brighton & Hove Albion (C, P)	46	24	12	10	88	64	1.375	60	Promotion to the Second Division
2	Brentford	46	24	10	12	82	56	1.464	58	Qualification for the Third Division
3	Plymouth Argyle	46	25	8	13	67	48	1.396	58	Qualification for the Third Division
4	Swindon Town	46	21	15	10	79	50	1.580	57	Qualification for the Third Division
5	Reading	46	21	13	12	79	51	1.549	55	Qualification for the Third Division

(C) Champions; (P) Promoted

== Results ==
Brentford's goal tally listed first.

=== Legend ===
Win	Draw	Loss

=== Friendlies ===
Date	Opponent	Venue	Result	Attendance	Scorer(s)	Notes
10 May 1958	St Mirren	A	1–4	n/a	n/a	(Note: Paisley Charity Cup.)

=== Football League Third Division South ===
No.	Date	Opponent	Venue	Result	Attendance	Scorer(s)
1	24 August 1957	Queens Park Rangers	A	0–1	15,734	
2	27 August 1957	Exeter City	H	1–0	12,307	Simpson (og)
3	31 August 1957	Colchester United	H	3–3	12,732	Newcombe, Towers (2)
4	4 September 1957	Exeter City	A	5–3	8,498	Towers (2), Francis, Parsons (2)
5	7 September 1957	Norwich City	A	2–3	19,150	Francis (2)
6	10 September 1957	Northampton Town	H	7–1	10,697	Parsons, Rainford (2), Towers (2), Francis (2)
7	14 September 1957	Bournemouth & Boscombe Athletic	H	4–2	13,733	Francis (3), Newcombe
8	16 September 1957	Northampton Town	A	1–3	4,528	Francis
9	21 September 1957	Walsall	A	2–0	10,775	Towers (2)
10	24 September 1957	Watford	A	1–4	7,031	Towers
11	28 September 1957	Coventry City	H	1–3	12,094	Caven
12	1 October 1957	Watford	H	0–0	10,447	
13	5 October 1957	Shrewsbury Town	A	2–0	7,057	Francis, Heath
14	12 October 1957	Gillingham	H	1–0	12,488	Towers
15	19 October 1957	Millwall	A	1–0	16,293	Rainford
16	26 October 1957	Swindon Town	H	0–0	13,676	
17	2 November 1957	Aldershot	A	2–0	7,133	Francis (2)
18	9 November 1957	Plymouth Argyle	H	2–0	15,594	Newcombe, Francis
19	23 November 1957	Newport County	H	2–1	13,603	Rainford, Towers
20	30 November 1957	Southampton	A	2–4	13,690	Towers, Francis
21	14 December 1957	Southend United	A	0–0	7,952	
22	21 December 1957	Queens Park Rangers	H	1–1	12,804	Rutter (og)
23	25 December 1957	Crystal Palace	H	0–3	12,394	
24	26 December 1957	Crystal Palace	A	1–2	16,797	Coote
25	28 December 1957	Colchester United	A	1–1	9,548	Francis
26	11 January 1958	Norwich City	H	7–1	11,850	Francis (2), Rainford (2), Parsons, Coote, Newcombe
27	18 January 1958	Bournemouth & Boscombe Athletic	A	0–1	11,090	
28	1 February 1958	Walsall	H	2–1	9,130	Rainford, Parsons (pen)
29	8 February 1958	Coventry City	A	0–0	9,391	
30	15 February 1958	Shrewsbury Town	H	2–0	12,842	Francis, Parsons
31	22 February 1958	Gillingham	A	2–3	6,626	Parsons, Towers
32	1 March 1958	Millwall	H	4–1	12,919	Towers (3), Francis
33	8 March 1958	Swindon Town	A	1–4	12,755	Francis
34	11 March 1958	Reading	H	2–1	13,230	Towers (2)
35	15 March 1958	Aldershot	H	4–2	10,482	Heath (2), Towers (2)
36	22 March 1958	Newport County	A	2–1	5,621	Heath, Rainford
37	24 March 1958	Port Vale	A	1–0	5,149	Towers
38	29 March 1958	Southend United	H	4–2	12,890	Towers (2), Francis (2)
39	4 April 1958	Torquay United	A	1–0	8,216	Towers
40	5 April 1958	Plymouth Argyle	A	0–0	20,021	
41	7 April 1958	Torquay United	H	0–1	15,680	
42	12 April 1958	Southampton	H	0–0	11,663	
43	19 April 1958	Brighton & Hove Albion	A	1–1	25,613	Heath
44	23 April 1958	Reading	A	2–1	12,852	Towers (2)
45	26 April 1958	Port Vale	H	4–1	11,923	Towers (3), Rainford
46	28 April 1958	Brighton & Hove Albion	H	1–0	25,744	Goundry

=== FA Cup ===
Round	Date	Opponent	Venue	Result	Attendance
1R	16 November 1957	Millwall	A	0–1	20,097

- Sources: 100 Years Of Brentford, Statto, 11v11

== Playing squad ==
Players' ages are as of the opening day of the 1957–58 season.

Pos.	Name	Nat.	Date of birth (age)	Signed from	Signed in	Notes
Goalkeepers						
GK	Gerry Cakebread	(England)	1 April 1936 (aged 21)	Youth	1954	
GK	Sonny Feehan	(Republic of Ireland)	17 September 1926 (aged 30)	Northampton Town	1954	
Defenders
DF	Alan Bassham	(England)	3 October 1933 (aged 23)	Youth	1953	
DF	Ken Horne	(England)	25 June 1926 (aged 31)	Blackpool	1950	
DF	Sid Russell	(England)	4 October 1937 (aged 19)	Jolly X	1956	
DF	Tom Wilson (c)	(England)	3 July 1930 (aged 27)	Fulham	1957	
Midfielders
HB	George Bristow	(England)	25 June 1933 (aged 24)	Youth	1950	
HB	Ken Coote	(England)	19 May 1928 (aged 29)	Wembley	1949	
HB	Ian Dargie	(England)	3 October 1931 (aged 25)	Tonbridge	1952	
HB	Ron Peplow	(England)	4 May 1935 (aged 22)	Southall	1955	
Forwards
FW	Billy Bloomfield	(England)	25 August 1939 (aged 17)	Youth	1956	
FW	John Caven	(Scotland)	6 July 1934 (aged 23)	Kilmarnock	1957	
FW	Christy Fletcher	(Republic of Ireland)	14 June 1933 (aged 24)	Cheltenham Town	1957	
FW	George Francis	(England)	4 February 1934 (aged 23)	Youth	1955	
FW	Billy Goundry	(England)	28 March 1934 (aged 23)	Huddersfield Town	1955	
FW	Dennis Heath	(England)	28 September 1934 (aged 22)	Youth	1954	
FW	Len Newcombe	(Wales)	28 February 1931 (aged 26)	Fulham	1956	
FW	Eric Parsons	(England)	9 November 1923 (aged 33)	Chelsea	1956	
FW	Johnny Rainford	(England)	11 December 1930 (aged 26)	Cardiff City	1953	
FW	Jim Towers	(England)	15 April 1933 (aged 24)	Youth	1954	
Players who left the club mid-season
HB	Wendell Morgan	(Wales)	22 April 1935 (aged 22)	Cardiff City	1954	Transferred to Gillingham

- Sources: 100 Years Of Brentford, Timeless Bees

== Coaching staff ==
Name	Role
(Scotland) Malky MacDonald	Manager
(England) Fred Monk	Trainer
(England) Jack Holliday	Assistant Trainer

== Statistics ==
=== Appearances and goals ===

Brentford's highest appearance-makers in each position during the Football League season.

Pos	Nat	Name	League		FA Cup		Total	
Pos	Nat	Name	Apps	Goals	Apps	Goals	Apps	Goals
GK	(England)	Gerry Cakebread	45	0	1	0	46	0
GK	(Republic of Ireland)	Sonny Feehan	1	0	0	0	1	0
DF	(England)	Alan Bassham	2	0	0	0	2	0
DF	(England)	Ken Horne	37	0	1	0	38	0
DF	(England)	Sid Russell	15	0	0	0	15	0
DF	(England)	Tom Wilson	27	0	0	0	27	0
HB	(England)	George Bristow	41	0	1	0	42	0
HB	(England)	Ken Coote	45	2	1	0	46	2
HB	(England)	Ian Dargie	46	0	1	0	47	0
HB	(Wales)	Wendell Morgan	5	0	—		5	0
HB	(England)	Ron Peplow	12	0	1	0	13	0
FW	(England)	Billy Bloomfield	1	0	0	0	1	0
FW	(Scotland)	John Caven	6	1	0	0	6	1
FW	(Republic of Ireland)	Christy Fletcher	3	0	0	0	3	0
FW	(England)	George Francis	45	22	1	0	46	22
FW	(England)	Billy Goundry	12	1	1	0	13	1
FW	(England)	Dennis Heath	15	5	0	0	15	5
FW	(Wales)	Len Newcombe	37	4	1	0	38	4
FW	(England)	Eric Parsons	30	7	1	0	31	7
FW	(England)	Johnny Rainford	45	9	1	0	46	9
FW	(England)	Jim Towers	36	29	0	0	36	29

- Players listed in italics left the club mid-season.
- Source: 100 Years Of Brentford

=== Goalscorers ===
Pos.	Nat	Player	FL3	FAC	Total
FW	(England)	Jim Towers	29	0	29
FW	(England)	George Francis	22	0	22
FW	(England)	Johnny Rainford	9	0	9
FW	(England)	Eric Parsons	7	0	7
FW	(England)	Dennis Heath	5	0	5
FW	(Wales)	Len Newcombe	4	0	4
HB	(England)	Ken Coote	2	0	2
FW	(Scotland)	John Caven	1	0	1
FW	(England)	Billy Goundry	1	0	1
Opponents			2	0	2
Total			82	0	82

- Players listed in italics left the club mid-season.
- Source: 100 Years Of Brentford

=== Management ===
Name	Nat	From	To	Record All Comps					Record League				
Name	Nat	From	To	P	W	D	L	W %	P	W	D	L	W %
Malky MacDonald	(Scotland)	24 August 1957	28 April 1958	47	24	10	13	51.06	46	24	10	12	52.17

=== Summary ===
Games played	47 (46 Third Division South, 1 FA Cup)
Games won	24 (24 Third Division South, 0 FA Cup)
Games drawn	10 (10 Third Division South, 0 FA Cup)
Games lost	13 (12 Third Division South, 1 FA Cup)
Goals scored	82 (82 Third Division South, 0 FA Cup)
Goals conceded	57 (56 Third Division South, 1 FA Cup)
Clean sheets	18 (18 Third Division South, 0 FA Cup)
Biggest league win	7–1 on two occasions
Worst league defeat	3–0 versus Crystal Palace, 25 December 1957; 4–1 on two occasions
Most appearances	47, Ian Dargie (46 Third Division South, 1 FA Cup)
Top scorer (league)	29, Jim Towers
Top scorer (all competitions)	29, Jim Towers

== Transfers & loans ==
Players transferred in
Date	Pos.	Name	Previous club	Fee	Ref.
July 1957	GK	(England) Reg Newton	(England) Tunbridge Wells Rangers	n/a	
July 1957	DF	(England) Tom Wilson	(England) Fulham	n/a	
September 1957	FW	(England) Terry Curran	(England) Tottenham Hotspur	n/a	
October 1957	FW	(Scotland) John Caven	(Scotland) Kilmarnock	n/a	
December 1957	FW	(Republic of Ireland) Christy Fletcher	(England) Cheltenham Town	n/a	
1957	FW	(England) Paddy Walsh	(England) Hayes	Amateur	
Players transferred out
Date	Pos.	Name	Subsequent club	Fee	Ref.
July 1957	HB	(England) Terry Robinson	(England) Northampton Town	Amateur	
September 1957	HB	(Wales) Wendell Morgan	(England) Gillingham	n/a	
Players released
Date	Pos.	Name	Subsequent club	Join date	Ref.
July 1957	FW	(England) Jeff Taylor	Retired		
May 1958	FW	(England) Frank Dudley	(England) Folkestone Town	1958	
May 1958	GK	(England) Reg Newton	(England) Yiewsley	1958	
May 1958	FW	(England) John Pearson	(England) Queens Park Rangers	June 1958	
May 1958	n/a	Roy Yeatman	(England) Yiewsley	1958	
1958	FW	(England) Paddy Walsh	(England) Southall	1958	
