= James Williamson =

James, Jim, Jimmy or Jimmie Williamson may refer to:

== Arts and entertainment ==
- J. C. Williamson (James Cassius Williamson, 1845–1913), American-Australian theatrical actor, producer and manager
- James Williamson (film pioneer) (1855–1933), Scottish film-pioneer
- James Williamson (musician) (born 1949), American guitarist, songwriter and record producer

== Law and politics ==
- James Williamson (New South Wales politician) (1811–1881), Australian politician
- James Williamson (New Zealand politician) (1814–1888), New Zealand politician
- James Williamson (Victorian politician) (1831–1914), Australian member of the Victorian Legislative Council
- James Williamson, 1st Baron Ashton (1842–1930), British businessman and Liberal Party politician
- James Allen Williamson (born 1951), American politician in Oklahoma

== Religion ==
- James Williamson (priest) (fl. 1723–1736), English Archdeacon of Lewes
- James Williamson (mathematician) (1725–1795), Scottish minister and mathematician, joint founder of Royal Society of Edinburgh
- James DeLong Williamson (1849–1935), American minister and president of Western Reserve University

== Sports ==
- Jimmy Williamson (1928–2015), Scottish footballer
- James Williamson (Australian cyclist) (1983–2010), Australian journalist and cyclist
- James Williamson (New Zealand cyclist) (born 1989), New Zealand cyclist

== Others ==
- James Alexander Williamson (1829–1902), Union general in the American Civil War
- James Williamson (historian) (1886–1964), English historian of maritime exploration
- James F. Williamson (fl. from c. 2000), American architect and author
- Jimmie Williamson, American community college leader
