= Billy Bloomfield =

English footballer

Personal information
- Full name: William George Bloomfield
- Date of birth: 25 August 1939
- Place of birth: Kensington, England
- Date of death: September 2003 (aged 64)
- Place of death: Kensington, England
- Position: Inside left

Youth career
- –1956: Brentford

Senior career*
Years	Team	Apps	(Gls)
1956–1959	Brentford	2	(0)
- * Club domestic league appearances and goals

William George Bloomfield (25 August 1939 – September 2003) was an English footballer who played as an inside left in the Football League for Brentford.

== Career ==
Bloomfield joined Third Division South club Brentford at a young age and made his senior debut on 19 April 1957, in a 2–2 West London derby draw with Queens Park Rangers at Loftus Road. He made one further first team appearance against Coventry City in September 1957. Bloomfield spent much of his time at Griffin Park playing for the reserves, scoring 28 goals in 98 appearances. He retired in January 1960 due to failing eyesight and scored a hat-trick in his final reserve team match versus Gillingham.

== Personal life ==
Bloomfield's older brother Jimmy was also a professional footballer. He was diagnosed with a severe eye disorder in the late 1950s.

== Career statistics ==
Appearances and goals by club, season and competition
Club	Season	League			FA Cup		Total	
Club	Season	Division	Apps	Goals	Apps	Goals	Apps	Goals
Brentford	1956–57	Third Division South	1	0	0	0	1	0
Brentford	1957–58	Third Division South	1	0	0	0	1	0
Career total			2	0	0	0	2	0
