= Billy Horn =

Scottish footballer

Personal information
- Full name: William Horn
- Date of birth: 13 May 1938 (age 88)
- Place of birth: Glasgow, Scotland
- Date of death: 18/07/2026
- Place of death: Glasgow
- Position: Winger

Youth career
- –1956: Kirkintilloch Rob Roy
- 1956–1958: Kilmarnock

Senior career*
Years	Team	Apps	(Gls)
1958–1959	Brentford	1	(0)
1959–1960	Kilmarnock	6	(0)
1960–1961	Third Lanark	0	(0)
1961–1962	Coleraine		
1963–1964	Bangor		
1964	Third Lanark	3	(0)
1964	Dumbarton	4	(0)
1966	Raith Rovers	5	(0)
1966	Clydebank	3	(0)
- * Club domestic league appearances and goals

William Horn (born 13 May 1938) is a Scottish retired professional footballer who played as a winger in the Scottish League for Kilmarnock, Raith Rovers, Dumbarton, Third Lanark and Clydebank. He also played in the Irish League and the Football League.

== Career statistics ==
Appearances and goals by club, season and competition
Club	Season	League			National Cup		League Cup		Total	
Club	Season	Division	Apps	Goals	Apps	Goals	Apps	Goals	Apps	Goals
Brentford	1958–59	Third Division	1	0	0	0	—		1	0
Kilmarnock	1959–60	Scottish Division One	6	0	0	0	0	0	6	0
Dumbarton	1964–65	Scottish Division Two	4	0	0	0	0	0	4	0
Clydebank	1966–67	Scottish Division Two	3	0	0	0	—		3	0
Career total			14	0	0	0	0	0	14	0
