= Johnny Rainford =

English footballer (1930–2001)

Personal information
- Full name: John William Rainford
- Date of birth: 11 December 1930
- Place of birth: Camden Town, England
- Date of death: 21 May 2001 (aged 70)
- Place of death: Hounslow, England
- Height: 5 ft 11 in (1.80 m)
- Position: Inside forward

Youth career
- 1948–1949: Crystal Palace

Senior career*
Years	Team	Apps	(Gls)
1949–1953	Crystal Palace	64	(8)
1953	Cardiff City	3	(1)
1953–1962	Brentford	299	(42)
1962–1963	Tonbridge	48	(4)
Total		414	(55)
- * Club domestic league appearances and goals

John William Rainford (11 December 1930 – 21 May 2001) was an English professional footballer who played as an inside forward. He is best remembered for his 9 years in the Football League with Brentford, for whom he made over 320 appearances. He was posthumously inducted into the Brentford Hall of Fame in 2015.

== Club career ==
=== Crystal Palace ===
Born in Camden Town, Rainford began his career at Third Division South club Crystal Palace and signed his first professional contract in March 1949. Despite making his professional debut late in the 1948–49 season, he had a slow start to his Selhurst Park career and failed to appear at all during the following season and made just one league appearance in 1950–51. Rainford broke into the team during the 1951–52 season and made 34 league appearances and scored his first goal for the club. He scored seven goals in 28 appearances in the following season and departed in May 1953. Rainford made 67 appearances and scored 10 goals for the Eagles.

=== Cardiff City ===
Rainford moved up to the First Division to join Cardiff City in a £3,000 deal in May 1953. He lasted only a matter of months at Ninian Park and scored one goal in three appearances before departing in October 1953.

=== Brentford ===
Rainford dropped down to the Second Division to sign for Brentford in October 1953 and was new manager Bill Dodgin's first signing for the club. He quickly established himself in the team and made 32 appearances during a disastrous 1953–54 season, which saw the Bees relegated to the Third Division South. Despite averaging just under 30 games a season, Rainford's career at Griffin Park didn't take off until the arrival of Malcolm McDonald as manager in May 1957. Playing at inside forward, he provided many assists for prolific strikers George Francis and Jim Towers and set a new club record for consecutive appearances, when he played 135 matches in a row between November 1957 and September 1960.

For his service to the club, Rainford was given a testimonial in May 1961, which he shared with Ken Coote. Rainford's final season was the 1961–62 campaign and he departed prior to the club's relegation to the Fourth Division in May 1962. He made 324 appearances and scored 49 goals during just shy of 9 years at Griffin Park. Rainford received a second testimonial in 1986 and shared the £1,100 proceeds with Jim Towers. He was posthumously inducted into the Brentford Hall of Fame in 2015.

=== Tonbridge ===
Rainford ended his career in non-League football with Southern League club Tonbridge, whom he joined on a free transfer late in the 1961–62 season.

== Representative career ==
Rainford appeared for the Third Division South representative team in a match against their northern counterparts on 16 March 1955. In a televised game, he scored the opening goal in a 2–0 win for the South.

== Career statistics ==
Appearances and goals by club, season and competition
Club	Season	League			FA Cup		League Cup		Other		Total	
Club	Season	Division	Apps	Goals	Apps	Goals	Apps	Goals	Apps	Goals	Apps	Goals
Cardiff City	1953–54	First Division	3	1	—		—		—		3	1
Brentford	1953–54	Second Division	29	2	3	1	—		—		32	3
Brentford	1954–55	Third Division South	33	4	6	2	—		—		39	6
Brentford	1955–56	Third Division South	37	3	2	0	—		—		39	3
Brentford	1956–57	Third Division South	7	1	0	0	—		—		7	1
Brentford	1957–58	Third Division South	45	9	1	0	—		—		46	9
Brentford	1958–59	Third Division	46	8	4	1	—		—		50	9
Brentford	1959–60	Third Division	46	8	2	0	—		—		48	8
Brentford	1960–61	Third Division	41	5	2	0	3	3	—		46	8
Brentford	1961–62	Third Division	15	2	1	0	1	0	—		17	2
Brentford	Total		299	42	21	4	4	3	—		324	49
Tonbridge	1961–62	Southern League Premier Division	17	2	—		—		10 (Note: 7 appearances in Kent Floodlit Cup, 2 appearances in Kent Senior Cup, 1 appearance in Kent Senior Shield)	0	27	2
Tonbridge	1962–63	Southern League First Division	31	2	1	0	—		17 (Note: 8 appearances in Kent Floodlit Cup, 3 appearances in Southern League Cup, 3 appearances in Kent Senior Cup, 3 appearances in Kent Senior Shield)	0	49	2
Tonbridge	Total		48	4	1	0	—		27	0	76	4
Career total			367	49	22	4	4	3	37	0	430	52

== Honours ==
- Brentford Hall of Fame
