= Johnny Meadows (English footballer) =

English footballer

Personal information
- Full name: John Alfred Meadows
- Date of birth: 13 November 1930
- Place of birth: Hoxton, England
- Date of death: March 2018 (aged 87)
- Place of death: Hertfordshire, England
- Positions: Wing half; inside forward

Senior career*
Years	Team	Apps	(Gls)
–1948	Kingsbury Town		
1948–	Chelsea	0	(0)
- Tudor Rose
- Willington
–1951	St Albans City	19	(1)
1951–1961	Watford	222	(42)
- Yiewsley
- * Club domestic league appearances and goals

John Alfred Meadows (13 November 1930 – March 2018), sometimes known as Jimmy Meadows, was an English professional footballer who made over 220 appearances as a wing half in the Football League for Watford.

== Personal life ==
Meadows' brothers Tony and Billy became amateur footballers.

== Honours ==
St Albans City

- Herts Senior Cup: 1950–51

== Career statistics ==
Appearances and goals by club, season and competition
Club	Season	League			FA Cup		Other		Total	
Club	Season	Division	Apps	Goals	Apps	Goals	Apps	Goals	Apps	Goals
St Albans City	1950–51	Isthmian League	19	1	3	0	10 (Note: 5 appearances and 1 goal in Herts Senior Cup, 3 appearances in Amateur Football Alliance Senior Invitation Cup, 1 appearance in FA Amateur Cup, 1 appearance in Herts Charity Cup)	1	32	2
Watford	1951–52	Third Division South	18	1	2	0	—		20	1
Watford	1952–53	Third Division South	26	12	2	1	—		28	13
Watford	1953–54	Third Division South	8	2	0	0	—		8	2
Watford	1954–55	Third Division South	33	4	4	0	—		37	4
Watford	1955–56	Third Division South	24	1	0	0	1 (Note: Appearances in Southern Floodlight Cup)	0	25	1
Watford	1956–57	Third Division South	42	12	2	1	2	2	46	15
Watford	1957–58	Third Division South	32	5	1	1	3	1	36	7
Watford	1958–59	Fourth Division	38	5	3	1	2	0	43	6
Watford	1959–60	Fourth Division	1	0	0	0	0	0	1	0
Watford	Total		222	42	14	4	8	3	244	49
Career total			241	43	17	4	18	4	276	51
