= Tom Wilson (footballer, born 1930) =

English footballer (1930–2010)

Personal information
- Full name: Thomas Frederick Wilson
- Date of birth: 3 July 1930
- Place of birth: Southampton, England
- Date of death: 29 March 2010 (aged 79)
- Place of death: Putney, England
- Height: 5 ft 10 1/2 in (1.79 m)
- Position: Full back

Youth career
- 1947–1950: Southampton

Senior career*
| Years | Team | Apps | (Gls) |
| 1950–1957 | Fulham | 45 | (0) |
| 1957–1962 | Brentford | 148 | (0) |
- Folkestone Town
- * Club domestic league appearances and goals

Thomas Frederick Wilson (3 July 1930 – 29 March 2010) was an English professional footballer who played as a full back in the Football League for Fulham and Brentford. He later returned to Fulham as a director. As a player, he was described as a "right back of the industrial type".

== Playing career ==
=== Southampton ===
As a full back, Wilson began his career at hometown club Southampton as an amateur in 1947. He departed at the end of the 1949–50 season, after failing to make a first team appearance for the club.

=== Fulham ===
Wilson followed former Southampton manager Bill Dodgin to First Division club Fulham in August 1950 and signed a professional contract. His time at Craven Cottage was fraught with injury and made just 49 appearances before departing at the end of the 1956–57 season.

=== Brentford ===
Wilson joined Third Division South club Brentford in July 1957. He had an uneven start to his Bees career, making 26 appearances during the 1957–58 season, but he did not play at all between September 1957 and February 1958. Wilson was an ever-present during the 1958–59 season and made 50 appearances and captained the team. An injury suffered in September 1959 halted a run of 73 consecutive appearances, but he was back to his best during the 1960–61 season, when he made 45 appearances. Wilson found himself mostly out of the team during the 1961–62 season and he departed the club at the end of the campaign. Wilson made 158 appearances during his five years at Griffin Park.

=== Folkestone Town ===
Wilson ended his career with a spell at Southern League club Folkestone Town. During the Big Freeze of 1963, the football programme was postponed for so many weeks that Wilson joked "the players will all have to be reintroduced to each other when we do meet again".

== Director ==
Wilson returned to Fulham in the late 1980s as a director, linking up with friend and former teammate Jimmy Hill. He negotiated the purchase of Craven Cottage from the Bank of England, which saved the club from being merged with Queens Park Rangers and Craven Cottage sold for development. Wilson remained in the role until he was asked to step down in 1997, at the time director Bill Muddyman was negotiating the sale of the club to Mohamed Al-Fayed.

== Personal life ==
Wilson attended Southampton Grammar School and St Mary's College. While a player at Fulham in the early 1950s, his flatmates were Jimmy Hill and Bobby Robson. Wilson was the best man at Robson's wedding in June 1955 and spoke at his funeral in September 2009. During his long spells out injured while at Fulham, Wilson trained as a quantity surveyor and entered the property world upon his retirement from football. At the time of his death in March 2010, Wilson was living in Putney and had been suffering from a long-term illness.

== Career statistics ==
Appearances and goals by club, season and competition
| Club | Season | League | | | FA Cup | | League Cup | | Total | |
| Club | Season | Division | Apps | Goals | Apps | Goals | Apps | Goals | Apps | Goals |
|---|---|---|---|---|---|---|---|---|---|---|
| Brentford | 1957–58 | Third Division South | 27 | 0 | 0 | 0 | — | | 27 | 0 |
| Brentford | 1958–59 | Third Division | 46 | 0 | 4 | 0 | — | | 50 | 0 |
| Brentford | 1959–60 | Third Division | 19 | 0 | 0 | 0 | — | | 19 | 0 |
| Brentford | 1960–61 | Third Division | 40 | 0 | 2 | 0 | 3 | 0 | 45 | 0 |
| Brentford | 1961–62 | Third Division | 16 | 0 | 0 | 0 | 1 | 0 | 17 | 0 |
| Career total | | | 148 | 0 | 6 | 0 | 4 | 0 | 158 | 0 |
