= Len Newcombe =

Welsh footballer

Personal information
- Full name: Bernard John Newcombe
- Date of birth: 28 February 1931
- Place of birth: Swansea, Wales
- Date of death: March 1996 (aged 65)
- Place of death: Swansea, Wales
- Position: Outside forward

Youth career
- 1947–1948: Fulham

Senior career*
Years	Team	Apps	(Gls)
1948–1956	Fulham	23	(3)
1948	→ Margate (loan)	1	(0)
1956–1959	Brentford	85	(8)
1959–1960	Guildford City		
1960–1961	Sittingbourne		
- * Club domestic league appearances and goals

Bernard John Newcombe (28 February 1931 – March 1996) was a Welsh professional footballer who played in the Football League for Brentford and Fulham as an outside forward. He later returned to Fulham as a scout.

== Club career ==
=== Fulham ===
Newcombe was spotted playing youth football in Wales by former Fulham goalkeeper Ossie Evans, who recommended the young outside forward to his former club. Newcombe transferred to the Second Division club in 1947. He joined high-flying Kent League First Division club Margate on loan in January 1948, but made just one appearance during his spell.

By the time Newcombe made his professional debut in a 1–0 defeat to Burnley on the final day of the 1950–51 season, the Cottagers were members of the First Division. He was always on the fringes of the first team at Craven Cottage and left the club in April 1956, having made 23 appearances and scored three goals.

=== Brentford ===
In April 1956, Newcombe transferred to Third Division South club Brentford and played in the final three games of the 1955–56 season. He established himself in the team in the 1956–57 season, making 46 appearances and he was a regular again the following year. Newcombe's professional career was effectively ended by a broken collarbone suffered in a match versus Torquay United in April 1958. Brentford were forced to play the rest of the match with 10 men and the resulting 1–0 defeat saw the Bees finish as runners-up in the Third Division South and miss out on promotion to the Second Division.

Newcombe made just one appearance during the 1958–59 season and departed the club at the end of the campaign. He made 89 appearances and scored eight goals during three years at Griffin Park.

=== Non-League football ===
Newcombe ended his career with spells at Southern League clubs Guildford City and Sittingbourne.

== Career statistics ==
Appearances and goals by club, season and competition
Club	Season	League			FA Cup		Total	
Club	Season	Division	Apps	Goals	Apps	Goals	Apps	Goals
Fulham	1951–52	First Division	5	1	0	0	5	1
Margate (loan)	1947–48	Kent League	1	0	—		1	0
Brentford	1955–56	Third Division South	3	1	—		3	1
Brentford	1956–57	Third Division South	43	3	3	0	46	3
Brentford	1957–58	Third Division South	37	4	1	0	38	4
Brentford	1958–59	Third Division	2	0	0	0	2	0
Brentford	Total		85	8	4	0	89	8
Career total			91	9	4	0	95	9
