= Arthur Williamson =

Scottish footballer (1930–2020)

Personal information
- Full name: Arthur Hamilton Williamson
- Date of birth: 26 July 1930
- Place of birth: Bankfoot, Scotland
- Date of death: 26 June 2020 (aged 89)
- Place of death: Perth, Scotland
- Position: Right back

Senior career*
| Years | Team | Apps | (Gls) |
| –1950 | Jeanfield Swifts | | |
| 1950–1954 | Clyde | 1 | (0) |
| 1955–1961 | Southend United | 269 | (2) |
- * Club domestic league appearances and goals

Arthur Hamilton Williamson (26 July 1930 – 26 June 2020) was a Scottish professional footballer who made over 260 appearances in the Football League for Southend United as a right back. He made a record 230 consecutive appearances in all competitions for the club. Williamson also made one appearance in the Scottish League for Clyde.

== Personal life ==
William's older brother Jimmy was also a footballer. After retiring from football, Williamson returned to Scotland to run his family's butchery business in Perthshire.
