= James F. Williamson =

American architect

James Williamson is a retired professor, architect and author in Montreat, NC. Following graduation from Rhodes College, he served as a naval officer and earned two Master of Architecture degrees from the University of Pennsylvania, where he was a student of Louis I. Kahn. His books include "Kahn at Penn" (Routledge 2015) and 2 novels, The Ravine (Sunstone Press 2013) and The Architect (Cold Tree Press 2007). Until his retirement Williamson was a full Professor of Architecture at the University of Memphis. In 2005 he became a Fellow (FAIA) of the American Institute of Architects (AIA). Prior to joining the University of Memphis faculty, his practice specialized in the renovation of historic buildings and the design of new religious architecture, receiving over 30 design awards. In 2014, Williamson received the AIA's Edward S. Frey Award for career contributions to religious architecture. He is the recipient of AIA Memphis' 2017 Francis Gassner Award for outstanding contributions to the quality of the built environment in Memphis. Williamson is also the recipient of the 2017 William Strickland Lifetime Achievement Award, the highest honor that AIA Tennessee can bestow on an individual, in recognition of a significant body of work having a lasting influence on the theory and practice of architecture. Williamson currently teaches the history of architecture at the University of North Carolina-Asheville's OLLI program.

== Works ==
Williamson's work includes:

- Ballet Memphis
- St. Thomas More Church in Paducah, Kentucky
- Renovations of Sacred Heart Cathedral in Rochester, New York
- St. John's Episcopal Church in Johnson City, Tennessee.
