= Malky MacDonald =

Scottish footballer & manager (1913–1999)

Personal information
- Full name: Malcolm MacDonald
- Date of birth: 26 October 1913
- Place of birth: Glasgow, Scotland
- Date of death: 26 September 1999 (aged 85)
- Place of death: Ardrossan, Scotland
- Position: Utility player

Youth career
- Linwood St Conval's

Senior career*
| Years | Team | Apps | (Gls) |
| –1931 | St Roch's | | |
| 1931–1932 | St Anthony's | | |
| 1932–1945 | Celtic | 132 | (32) |
| 1940 | → Kilmarnock (guest) | 1 | (0) |
| 1945–1946 | Kilmarnock | 8 | (0) |
| 1946–1949 | Brentford | 87 | (1) |
| 1951 | Kilmarnock | 2 | (1) |

International career
| 1928 | Scotland Schoolboys | | |
| 1941–1944 | Scotland (wartime) | 3 | (0) |
| 1941 | Scottish League XI | 1 | (0) |

Managerial career
- 1950–1957: Kilmarnock
- 1957–1965: Brentford
- 1965–1968: Kilmarnock
- 1966: Scotland (caretaker)
- * Club domestic league appearances and goals

Malcolm MacDonald (26 October 1913 – 26 September 1999) was a Scottish professional footballer and manager, best remembered for his time as a utility player with Celtic and as a manager with Kilmarnock and Brentford. MacDonald managed the Scotland national team on a caretaker basis in 1966. He is a member of the Brentford Hall of Fame.

== Club career ==
=== Celtic ===
MacDonald began his career in Glasgow with junior clubs St Roch's and St Anthony's, before signing for Scottish First Division club Celtic on 19 March 1932. Playing as an outside left, he had a dream debut, scoring both of Celtic's goals in a 2–0 victory over Partick Thistle in the final league match of the 1931–32 season. Though he built on his appearance record year-by-year to make 38 appearances during the 1934–35 season, the arrival of Willie Lyon and a cartilage problem saw MacDonald's chances limited in 1935–36, making just 11 appearances during a season in which Celtic won the First Division title for the first time in 10 years.

MacDonald didn't fully break into the team on a regular basis until the departure of Willie Buchan to Blackpool in November 1937. He made 34 appearances and scored 13 goals during the 1937–38 season, helping the Bhoys to the league title and the Empire Exhibition Trophy. MacDonald's best season came in 1938–39, scoring 20 goals in 40 games and scoring a hat-trick in the Old Firm match on 10 September 1938. The outbreak of the Second World War in September 1939 saw competitive football suspended for the duration of the conflict, but MacDonald remained with Celtic, making 199 wartime appearances (18 goals) before the official leagues and cups resumed in 1946. MacDonald departed Celtic after the war, having made 156 appearances in major competitions and scored 38 goals during his time with the club. He played in every position bar goalkeeper during his years at Celtic Park.

=== Kilmarnock ===
MacDonald returned to Southern League 'A' club Kilmarnock in 1945, after a period guesting in 1940 during the Second World War. He remained at Rugby Park until October 1946. MacDonald would later play for the club again while manager during the 1951–52 season. He made 10 appearances and scored one goal across his two spells with the club.

=== Brentford ===
MacDonald moved to England to join First Division club Brentford for a £1,500 fee in October 1946. Manager Harry Curtis played him as an inside forward, but a broken jaw hampered his progress and the Bees were relegated to the Second Division at the end of the 1946–47 season. Injury to Bill Gorman saw MacDonald take up a position at full back in September 1947 and he kept the position until his retirement at the end of the 1948–49 season. He made 93 appearances and scored one goal during his time at Griffin Park.

== International and representative career ==
MacDonald's first taste of international football came with the Scotland schoolboy team in 1928. In 1939, he made 8 appearances for the Scottish FA XI on its tour of Canada and the United States. He later won three wartime caps for the full Scotland team during 1941. MacDonald represented the Scottish Football League XI against their English counterparts on 11 October 1941.

== Management and coaching career ==
=== Scotland ===
MacDonald briefly coached the Scotland national football team for wartime internationals played in 1945.

=== Brentford ===
MacDonald's coaching career began while still a player at Brentford and he held a player-coach role during the 1948–49 season.

=== Kilmarnock ===
MacDonald took up his first managerial appointment with former club Kilmarnock in May 1950. He turned the ailing club into a competitive force in the Scottish Second Division and took the club to fifth, fourth and second-place finishes by the end of the 1953–54 season, which won Killie promotion to the First Division. MacDonald also brought the club further success in the cups, reaching the 1952 Scottish League Cup Final and the 1957 Scottish Cup Final. He departed the club at the end of the 1956–57 season.

=== Return to Brentford ===
MacDonald returned to Brentford, then having fallen to the Third Division South, as manager prior to the beginning of the 1957–58 season. He instantly turned around the club's fortunes, using a largely home-grown squad to push for promotion to the Second Division during the season, though an injury to Len Newcombe would ultimately contribute to a second-place finish. With an ageing squad, MacDonald achieved third and sixth-place finishes in 1958–59 and 1959–60, before toying with relegation during the 1960–61 season. The Brentford board's decision to shrink the playing squad (which included selling prolific twin forwards Jim Towers and George Francis) and to retain a number of players on a part-time basis contributed to the club's relegation at the end of the 1961–62 season.

New chairman Jack Dunnett pumped money into the club in 1961 and MacDonald's signings of Johnny Brooks, John Dick and Billy McAdams in 1962 saw Brentford win the 1962–63 Fourth Division title at a canter. MacDonald remained with Brentford until January 1965, when he announced he would be departing Griffin Park. He intended to carry on in his position until the end of the 1964–65 season, but was given a leave of absence on 2 February 1965 by chairman Dunnett. For his achievements with the Bees, MacDonald was later inducted into the club's Hall of Fame.

=== Return to Kilmarnock ===
On 26 January 1965, MacDonald agreed a £4,000-a-year contract to return to Kilmarnock as manager on 1 July 1965. The club had finished the 1964–65 season as First Division champions for the first time in the club's history, but MacDonald could not build on that and accumulated a third and two seventh-place finishes, though he took Killie to the semi-finals of the 1966–67 Inter-Cities Fairs Cup. He was sacked on 2 April 1968.

=== Scotland caretaker ===
MacDonald briefly managed the Scotland team on a caretaker basis in late 1966 and presided over two 1966–67 British Home Championship matches: a 1–1 draw with Wales and a 2–1 victory over Northern Ireland.

== Scouting career ==
MacDonald scouted for Tottenham Hotspur from the late 1960s until the mid 1970s, working for friend Bill Nicholson.

== Personal life ==
MacDonald was born in Glasgow to parents from South Uist and was known as 'Calum' to his friends and teammates. After his retirement from football management, MacDonald went into business as a physiotherapist and chiropodist in Troon. MacDonald died on 26 September 1999.

== Career statistics ==
Appearances and goals by club, season and competition
| Club | Season | League | | | National cup (Note: Includes Scottish Cup, FA Cup) | | Other | | Total | |
| Club | Season | Division | Apps | Goals | Apps | Goals | Apps | Goals | Apps | Goals |
|---|---|---|---|---|---|---|---|---|---|---|
| Celtic | 1931–32 | Scottish First Division | 1 | 2 | 0 | 0 | 3 (Note: 2 appearances and 2 goals in Glasgow Charity Cup, 1 appearance in St Vincent de Paul Cup) | 2 | 4 | 4 |
| Celtic | 1932–33 | Scottish First Division | 6 | 0 | 0 | 0 | 4 (Note: 2 appearances in Glasgow Cup, 2 appearances in Glasgow Charity Cup) | 0 | 10 | 0 |
| Celtic | 1933–34 | Scottish First Division | 12 | 1 | 1 | 0 | 3 (Note: Appearances in Glasgow Charity Cup) | 0 | 16 | 1 |
| Celtic | 1934–35 | Scottish First Division | 30 | 1 | 4 | 0 | 4 | 0 | 38 | 1 |
| Celtic | 1935–36 | Scottish First Division | 10 | 0 | 0 | 0 | 1 (Note: Appearance in Glasgow Cup) | 0 | 11 | 0 |
| Celtic | 1936–37 | Scottish First Division | 12 | 1 | 0 | 0 | 2 (Note: 1 appearance in Glasgow Cup, 1 appearance in Glasgow Charity Cup) | 0 | 14 | 1 |
| Celtic | 1937–38 | Scottish First Division | 27 | 12 | 3 | 1 | 4 (Note: 3 appearances in Empire Exhibition Trophy, 1 appearance in Glasgow Cup) | 0 | 34 | 13 |
| Celtic | 1938–39 | Scottish First Division | 30 | 15 | 5 | 4 | 5 (Note: 4 appearances and 1 goal in Glasgow Cup, 1 appearance in Glasgow Charity Cup) | 1 | 40 | 20 |
| Celtic | Total | | 132 | 32 | 13 | 5 | 26 | 3 | 171 | 40 |
| Kilmarnock | 1946–47 | Scottish First Division | 8 | 0 | — | | — | | 8 | 0 |
| Brentford | 1946–47 | First Division | 16 | 1 | 0 | 0 | — | | 16 | 1 |
| Brentford | 1947–48 | Second Division | 41 | 0 | 2 | 0 | — | | 43 | 0 |
| Brentford | 1948–49 | Second Division | 30 | 0 | 4 | 0 | — | | 34 | 0 |
| Brentford | Total | | 87 | 1 | 6 | 0 | — | | 93 | 1 |
| Kilmarnock | 1950–51 | Scottish Second Division | 2 | 1 | 0 | 0 | — | | 2 | 1 |
| Kilmarnock | Total | | 10 | 1 | 0 | 0 | — | | 10 | 1 |
| Career total | | | 229 | 34 | 19 | 5 | 26 | 3 | 274 | 42 |

== Managerial statistics ==
| Team | From | To | Record | | | | | Ref |
| Team | From | To | G | W | D | L | Win % | Ref |
|---|---|---|---|---|---|---|---|---|
| Kilmarnock | May 1950 | 1957 | 297 | 138 | 57 | 102 | 46.46 | |
| Brentford | 1957 | February 1965 | 380 | 160 | 94 | 126 | 42.11 | |
| Kilmarnock | July 1965 | 2 April 1968 | 141 | 67 | 30 | 44 | 47.52 | |
| Scotland (caretaker) | 1966 | 1967 | 2 | 1 | 1 | 0 | 50.00 | |
| Total | | | 820 | 366 | 182 | 272 | 44.63 | — |

== Honours ==
=== As a player ===
Celtic

- Scottish League First Division: 1935–36, 1937–38
- Empire Exhibition Trophy: 1938

=== As a manager ===
Kilmarnock

- Scottish League Second Division second-place promotion: 1953–54

Brentford

- Football League Fourth Division: 1962–63

=== As an individual ===
- Brentford Hall of Fame
