= Ossie Evans =

Welsh footballer

Personal information
- Full name: Oswald Vernon Evans
- Date of birth: 2 September 1916
- Place of birth: Llanelli, Wales
- Date of death: May 1986 (aged 69)
- Place of death: Blackburn, England
- Position: Goalkeeper

Senior career*
Years	Team	Apps	(Gls)
–1946	Milford Haven		
1946	Fulham	1	(0)
1949–1950	Ashford Town	35	(0)
- * Club domestic league appearances and goals

Oswald Vernon Evans (2 September 1916 – May 1986) was a Welsh footballer who made more than one appearance in the Football League for Fulham as a goalkeeper. While a Fulham player, he "reputedly weighed over 20 stone".

== Career statistics ==
Appearances and goals by club, season and competition
Club	Season	League			FA Cup		Other		Total	
Club	Season	Division	Apps	Goals	Apps	Goals	Apps	Goals	Apps	Goals
Fulham	1946–47	Second Division	1	0	0	0	―		1	0
Ashford Town	1948–49	Kent League	18	0	0	0	0	0	18	0
Ashford Town	1949–50	Kent League	17	0	1	0	7 (Note: 3 appearances in Kent League Cup, 2 appearances in Kent Senior Cup, 2 appearances in Kent Senior Shield)	0	25	0
Ashford Town	Total		35	0	1	0	7	0	43	0
Career total			36	0	1	0	7	0	44	0

== Honours ==
Ashford Town

- Kent League: 1949–50
