= Christy Fletcher =

Irish footballer (1933–1974)

Personal information
- Full name: Christopher Columba Fletcher
- Date of birth: 14 June 1933
- Place of birth: Buncrana, Ireland
- Date of death: 1974 (aged 40–41)
- Place of death: Cambuslang, Scotland
- Positions: Outside left; centre forward

Youth career
- Southend United

Senior career*
| Years | Team | Apps | (Gls) |
| 1955–1957 | Kilmarnock | 19 | (3) |
| 1957 | Cheltenham Town | | |
| 1957–1959 | Brentford | 3 | (0) |
| 1959–1960 | Peterborough United | 4 | (3) |
| 1960–1961 | Morton | 15 | (5) |
| 1961 | Berwick Rangers | 0 | (0) |
| 1961 | East Fife | 1 | (0) |
- * Club domestic league appearances and goals

Christopher Columba Fletcher (14 June 1933 – 1974) was an Irish professional footballer who played as a forward in the Scottish League for Kilmarnock and Morton. He also played in the Football League for Brentford.

== Career statistics ==
Appearances and goals by club, season and competition
| Club | Season | League | | | National cup (Note: Includes Scottish Cup, FA Cup) | | League cup (Note: Includes Scottish League Cup) | | Total | |
| Club | Season | Division | Apps | Goals | Apps | Goals | Apps | Goals | Apps | Goals |
|---|---|---|---|---|---|---|---|---|---|---|
| Kilmarnock | 1955–56 | Scottish First Division | 15 | 2 | 0 | 0 | 0 | 0 | 15 | 2 |
| Kilmarnock | 1956–57 | Scottish First Division | 4 | 1 | 0 | 0 | 2 | 0 | 6 | 1 |
| Kilmarnock | Total | | 19 | 3 | 0 | 0 | 2 | 0 | 21 | 3 |
| Brentford | 1957–58 | Third Division South | 3 | 0 | 0 | 0 | — | | 3 | 0 |
| Peterborough United | 1959–60 | Midland League | 4 | 3 | 0 | 0 | — | | 4 | 3 |
| Career total | | | 26 | 6 | 0 | 0 | 2 | 0 | 28 | 6 |
