= Jimmy Williamson =

Scottish footballer

Personal information
- Date of birth: 2 May 1928
- Place of birth: Perthshire, Scotland
- Date of death: 21 February 2015 (aged 86)
- Place of death: Dunkeld and Birnam, Scotland
- Position: Centre half

Youth career
- Murthly Amateurs

Senior career*
Years	Team	Apps	(Gls)
- Stanley Juniors
- Blairgowrie
1952–1956	Dunfermline Athletic	35	(0)
1956	Montrose	9	(0)
- Vale of Atholl
- * Club domestic league appearances and goals

Jimmy Williamson (2 May 1928 – 21 February 2015) was a Scottish professional footballer who played in the Scottish League for Dunfermline Athletic and Montrose as a centre half.

== Personal life ==
Williamson's younger brother Arthur also became a footballer. In 1946, he was called up to the Royal Navy and served in Hong Kong and Singapore. He was a butcher by trade.
