= Adrian Thorne =

English footballer (1937–2022)

Personal information
- Full name: Adrian Ernest Thorne
- Date of birth: 2 August 1937
- Place of birth: Brighton, England
- Date of death: 29 July 2022 (aged 84)
- Position: Left winger

Senior career*
Years	Team	Apps	(Gls)
195?–1954	Brighton Old Grammarians		
1954–1961	Brighton & Hove Albion	76	(38)
1961–1963	Plymouth Argyle	11	(2)
1963–1965	Exeter City	41	(8)
1965–1966	Leyton Orient	2	(0)
1966–1969	Cheltenham Town		
1969–1970	Barnet	18	(2)
- * Club domestic league appearances and goals

Adrian Ernest Thorne (2 August 1937 – 29 July 2022) was an English professional footballer who scored 48 goals from 130 appearances in the Football League playing as a left winger for Brighton & Hove Albion, Plymouth Argyle, Exeter City and Leyton Orient. He was Brighton's top scorer in the 1960–61 season with 14 goals in all competitions, and his five goals against Watford on the final day of the 1957–58 season ensured their promotion to the Second Division for the first time in the club's history. He also helped Exeter City gain promotion from the Third Division in 1964. He went on to play Southern League for Cheltenham Town and Barnet.

== Career ==
Thorne was born in Brighton on 2 August 1937, and attended Brighton, Hove and Sussex Grammar School. He was spotted by Brighton & Hove Albion as a 17-year-old playing for his school's Old Boys' team in the Sussex County League, and signed for the club in August 1954. Like many players in the 1950s, his career development was interrupted by the requirements of National Service, and he made his debut in the Third Division South on 18 January 1958, at the age of 20, scoring in a 2–0 defeat of Southend United.

Going into the final game of the season, at home to Watford, Albion needed a point to secure the Third Division South title and promotion to the Second Division for the first time in the club's history. With Dave Sexton injured, Thorne was selected to make just his seventh League appearance: he scored five goals as Albion won 6–0. Despite scoring a goal every two games, and finishing the 1960–61 season as the club's top scorer, with 14 goals in all competitions, he was never an undisputed member of the starting eleven, and towards the end of that season he asked for a transfer.

Thorne joined Second Division club Plymouth Argyle for an £8,000 fee, but made little impact. In two years, he played only 12 games, scoring twice, and moved on to Exeter City during the 1963–64 season. He became a regular in the Exeter team that gained promotion to the Third Division that season, and remained with the club for another year before signing for Second Division Leyton Orient on a free transfer in the summer of 1965. At Orient, Thorne was reunited with former Brighton teammates Dave Sexton, now managing the club, and Tony Nicholas, but he played only twice for them in the League. He went on to play Southern League football for Cheltenham Town and Barnet.

Thorne married wife Gillian when he was a Plymouth player. While at Orient, he began to train as a teacher, gaining qualifications in science and physical education, and went on to work in that profession.

Thorne died in 2022 at the age of 84.
