= 1958–59 Football League =

60th season of the Football League

The Football League
- Season: 1958–59
- Champions: Wolverhampton Wanderers

The 1958–59 season was the 60th completed season of The Football League.

This season saw the introduction of the Fourth Division.

== Final league tables ==
The tables below are reproduced here in the exact form that they can be found at The Rec.Sport.Soccer Statistics Foundation website and in Rothmans Book of Football League Records 1888–89 to 1978–79, with home and away statistics separated.

Beginning with the season 1894–95, clubs finishing level on points were separated according to goal average (goals scored divided by goals conceded), or more properly put, goal ratio. The goal average system was eventually scrapped beginning with the 1976–77 season.

From this season, the bottom four teams of the Fourth Division were required to apply for re-election.

== First Division ==
First Division
- Season: 1958–59
- Champions: Wolverhampton Wanderers; 3rd English title
- Relegated: Aston Villa; Portsmouth
- European Cup: Wolverhampton Wanderers
- Matches: 462
- Goals: 1,692 (3.66 per match)
- Top goalscorer: Jimmy Greaves (33 goals)
- Biggest home win: Wolverhampton Wanderers 7–0 Portsmouth (27 December 1958)
- Biggest away win: Birmingham City 0–6 West Bromwich Albion (3 September 1958); Nottingham Forest 1–7 Birmingham City (7 March 1959)
- Highest scoring: Tottenham Hotspur 10–4 Everton (11 October 1958)

| Pos | Team | Pld | W | D | L | GF | GA | GAv | Pts | Qualification or relegation |
|---|---|---|---|---|---|---|---|---|---|---|
| 1 | Wolverhampton Wanderers (C) | 42 | 28 | 5 | 9 | 110 | 49 | 2.245 | 61 | Qualification for the European Cup preliminary round |
| 2 | Manchester United | 42 | 24 | 7 | 11 | 103 | 66 | 1.561 | 55 | |
| 3 | Arsenal | 42 | 21 | 8 | 13 | 88 | 68 | 1.294 | 50 | |
| 4 | Bolton Wanderers | 42 | 20 | 10 | 12 | 79 | 66 | 1.197 | 50 | |
| 5 | West Bromwich Albion | 42 | 18 | 13 | 11 | 88 | 68 | 1.294 | 49 | |
| 6 | West Ham United | 42 | 21 | 6 | 15 | 85 | 70 | 1.214 | 48 | |
| 7 | Burnley | 42 | 19 | 10 | 13 | 81 | 70 | 1.157 | 48 | |
| 8 | Blackpool | 42 | 18 | 11 | 13 | 66 | 49 | 1.347 | 47 | |
| 9 | Birmingham City | 42 | 20 | 6 | 16 | 84 | 68 | 1.235 | 46 | |
| 10 | Blackburn Rovers | 42 | 17 | 10 | 15 | 76 | 70 | 1.086 | 44 | |
| 11 | Newcastle United | 42 | 17 | 7 | 18 | 80 | 80 | 1.000 | 41 | |
| 12 | Preston North End | 42 | 17 | 7 | 18 | 70 | 77 | 0.909 | 41 | |
| 13 | Nottingham Forest | 42 | 17 | 6 | 19 | 71 | 74 | 0.959 | 40 | |
| 14 | Chelsea | 42 | 18 | 4 | 20 | 77 | 98 | 0.786 | 40 | |
| 15 | Leeds United | 42 | 15 | 9 | 18 | 57 | 74 | 0.770 | 39 | |
| 16 | Everton | 42 | 17 | 4 | 21 | 71 | 87 | 0.816 | 38 | |
| 17 | Luton Town | 42 | 12 | 13 | 17 | 68 | 71 | 0.958 | 37 | |
| 18 | Tottenham Hotspur | 42 | 13 | 10 | 19 | 85 | 95 | 0.895 | 36 | |
| 19 | Leicester City | 42 | 11 | 10 | 21 | 67 | 98 | 0.684 | 32 | |
| 20 | Manchester City | 42 | 11 | 9 | 22 | 64 | 95 | 0.674 | 31 | |
| 21 | Aston Villa (R) | 42 | 11 | 8 | 23 | 58 | 87 | 0.667 | 30 | Relegation to the Second Division |
| 22 | Portsmouth (R) | 42 | 6 | 9 | 27 | 64 | 112 | 0.571 | 21 | Relegation to the Second Division |

Source: World Football
Rules for classification: 1) Points; 2) Goal average; 3) Goals scored
(C) Champions; (R) Relegated

=== Results ===
| Home \ Away | ARS | AST | BIR | BLB | BLP | BOL | BUR | CHE | EVE | LEE | LEI | LUT | MCI | MUN | NEW | NOT | POR | PNE | TOT | WBA | WHU | WOL |
|---|---|---|---|---|---|---|---|---|---|---|---|---|---|---|---|---|---|---|---|---|---|---|
| Arsenal | | 1–2 | 2–1 | 1–1 | 1–4 | 6–1 | 3–0 | 1–1 | 3–1 | 1–0 | 5–1 | 1–0 | 4–1 | 3–2 | 3–2 | 3–1 | 5–2 | 1–2 | 3–1 | 4–3 | 1–2 | 1–1 |
| Aston Villa | 1–2 | | 1–1 | 1–0 | 1–1 | 2–1 | 0–0 | 3–1 | 2–4 | 2–1 | 1–2 | 3–1 | 1–1 | 0–2 | 2–1 | 2–3 | 3–2 | 2–0 | 1–1 | 1–4 | 1–2 | 1–3 |
| Birmingham City | 4–1 | 4–1 | | 3–0 | 4–2 | 1–3 | 2–1 | 4–1 | 2–1 | 4–1 | 4–2 | 0–1 | 6–1 | 0–4 | 1–0 | 0–3 | 2–2 | 5–1 | 5–1 | 0–6 | 3–0 | 0–3 |
| Blackburn Rovers | 4–2 | 2–3 | 3–2 | | 0–0 | 1–1 | 4–1 | 0–3 | 2–1 | 2–4 | 5–0 | 3–1 | 2–1 | 1–3 | 3–0 | 3–0 | 2–1 | 4–1 | 5–0 | 0–0 | 1–2 | 1–2 |
| Blackpool | 1–2 | 2–1 | 2–0 | 1–1 | | 4–0 | 1–1 | 5–0 | 1–1 | 3–0 | 2–1 | 3–0 | 0–0 | 2–1 | 3–0 | 1–0 | 1–1 | 4–2 | 0–0 | 1–1 | 2–0 | 0–1 |
| Bolton Wanderers | 2–1 | 1–3 | 2–0 | 3–1 | 4–0 | | 1–2 | 6–0 | 0–3 | 4–0 | 3–3 | 4–2 | 4–1 | 6–3 | 1–1 | 3–2 | 2–1 | 2–1 | 4–1 | 2–1 | 0–2 | 2–2 |
| Burnley | 3–1 | 3–1 | 0–1 | 0–0 | 3–1 | 0–1 | | 4–0 | 3–1 | 3–1 | 3–3 | 2–2 | 3–4 | 4–2 | 2–2 | 0–2 | 2–1 | 1–0 | 3–1 | 1–3 | 1–0 | 0–2 |
| Chelsea | 0–3 | 2–1 | 1–0 | 0–2 | 3–1 | 0–1 | 1–3 | | 3–1 | 2–0 | 5–2 | 3–3 | 2–0 | 2–3 | 6–5 | 4–1 | 2–2 | 3–1 | 4–2 | 0–2 | 3–2 | 6–2 |
| Everton | 1–6 | 2–1 | 3–1 | 2–2 | 3–1 | 1–0 | 1–2 | 3–1 | | 3–2 | 0–1 | 3–1 | 3–1 | 3–2 | 0–2 | 1–3 | 2–1 | 1–4 | 2–1 | 3–3 | 2–2 | 0–1 |
| Leeds United | 2–1 | 0–0 | 0–0 | 2–1 | 1–1 | 3–4 | 1–1 | 4–0 | 1–0 | | 1–1 | 1–1 | 0–4 | 1–2 | 3–2 | 1–0 | 1–1 | 1–3 | 3–1 | 0–1 | 1–0 | 1–3 |
| Leicester City | 2–3 | 6–3 | 2–4 | 1–1 | 0–3 | 0–0 | 1–1 | 0–3 | 2–0 | 0–1 | | 3–1 | 3–1 | 2–1 | 0–1 | 0–3 | 3–1 | 2–2 | 3–4 | 2–2 | 1–1 | 1–0 |
| Luton Town | 6–3 | 2–1 | 0–1 | 1–1 | 1–1 | 0–0 | 6–2 | 2–1 | 0–1 | 1–1 | 4–3 | | 5–1 | 0–0 | 4–2 | 5–1 | 3–1 | 4–1 | 1–2 | 1–1 | 4–1 | 0–1 |
| Manchester City | 0–0 | 0–0 | 4–1 | 0–1 | 0–2 | 3–3 | 1–4 | 5–1 | 1–3 | 2–1 | 3–1 | 1–1 | | 1–1 | 5–1 | 1–1 | 3–2 | 1–1 | 5–1 | 0–2 | 3–1 | 1–4 |
| Manchester United | 1–1 | 2–1 | 1–0 | 6–1 | 3–1 | 3–0 | 1–3 | 5–2 | 2–1 | 4–0 | 4–1 | 2–1 | 4–1 | | 4–4 | 1–1 | 6–1 | 0–2 | 2–2 | 1–2 | 4–1 | 2–1 |
| Newcastle United | 1–0 | 1–0 | 1–1 | 1–5 | 1–0 | 2–0 | 5–2 | 1–2 | 4–0 | 2–2 | 3–1 | 1–0 | 4–1 | 1–1 | | 1–3 | 2–0 | 1–2 | 1–2 | 1–2 | 3–1 | 3–4 |
| Nottingham Forest | 1–1 | 2–0 | 1–7 | 1–1 | 2–0 | 3–0 | 1–2 | 1–3 | 2–1 | 0–3 | 1–4 | 3–1 | 4–0 | 0–3 | 3–0 | | 5–0 | 0–1 | 1–1 | 1–1 | 4–0 | 1–3 |
| Portsmouth | 0–1 | 5–2 | 1–1 | 2–1 | 1–2 | 0–1 | 4–2 | 2–2 | 2–3 | 2–0 | 4–1 | 2–2 | 3–4 | 1–3 | 1–5 | 0–1 | | 1–2 | 1–1 | 2–6 | 1–2 | 3–5 |
| Preston North End | 2–1 | 4–2 | 3–0 | 1–2 | 0–3 | 0–0 | 0–4 | 2–0 | 3–1 | 1–2 | 3–1 | 0–0 | 2–0 | 3–4 | 3–4 | 3–5 | 3–1 | | 2–2 | 2–4 | 2–1 | 1–2 |
| Tottenham Hotspur | 1–4 | 3–2 | 0–4 | 3–1 | 2–3 | 1–1 | 2–2 | 4–0 | 10–4 | 2–3 | 6–0 | 3–0 | 3–1 | 1–3 | 1–3 | 1–0 | 4–4 | 1–2 | | 5–0 | 1–4 | 2–1 |
| West Bromwich Albion | 1–1 | 1–1 | 2–2 | 2–3 | 3–1 | 1–1 | 2–4 | 4–0 | 2–3 | 1–2 | 2–2 | 2–0 | 3–0 | 1–3 | 2–2 | 2–0 | 1–2 | 1–1 | 4–3 | | 2–1 | 2–1 |
| West Ham United | 0–0 | 7–2 | 1–2 | 6–3 | 1–0 | 4–3 | 1–0 | 4–2 | 3–2 | 2–3 | 0–3 | 0–0 | 5–1 | 3–2 | 3–0 | 5–3 | 6–0 | 1–1 | 2–1 | 3–1 | | 2–0 |
| Wolverhampton Wanderers | 6–1 | 4–0 | 3–1 | 5–0 | 2–0 | 1–2 | 3–3 | 1–2 | 1–0 | 6–2 | 3–0 | 5–0 | 2–0 | 4–0 | 1–3 | 5–1 | 7–0 | 2–0 | 1–1 | 5–2 | 1–1 | |

Updated to match(es) played on unknown. Source: Ian Laschke: Rothmans Book of Football League Records 1888–89 to 1978–79. Macdonald and Jane’s, London & Sydney, 1980.
Legend: Blue = home team win; Yellow = draw; Red = away team win.

=== Maps ===
Locations of the Football League First Division London teams 1958–1959
Locations of the Football League First Division 1958–1959 teams

== Second Division ==
Second Division
- Season: 1958–59
- Champions: Sheffield Wednesday
- Promoted: Sheffield Wednesday; Fulham
- Relegated: Grimsby Town; Barnsley
- Matches: 462
- Goals: 1,604 (3.47 per match)
- Top goalscorer: Brian Clough (42 goals)

| Pos | Team | Pld | W | D | L | GF | GA | GAv | Pts | Qualification or relegation |
|---|---|---|---|---|---|---|---|---|---|---|
| 1 | Sheffield Wednesday (C, P) | 42 | 28 | 6 | 8 | 106 | 48 | 2.208 | 62 | Promotion to the First Division |
| 2 | Fulham (P) | 42 | 27 | 6 | 9 | 96 | 61 | 1.574 | 60 | Promotion to the First Division |
| 3 | Sheffield United | 42 | 23 | 7 | 12 | 82 | 48 | 1.708 | 53 | |
| 4 | Liverpool | 42 | 24 | 5 | 13 | 87 | 62 | 1.403 | 53 | |
| 5 | Stoke City | 42 | 21 | 7 | 14 | 72 | 58 | 1.241 | 49 | |
| 6 | Bristol Rovers | 42 | 18 | 12 | 12 | 80 | 64 | 1.250 | 48 | |
| 7 | Derby County | 42 | 20 | 8 | 14 | 74 | 71 | 1.042 | 48 | |
| 8 | Charlton Athletic | 42 | 18 | 7 | 17 | 92 | 90 | 1.022 | 43 | |
| 9 | Cardiff City | 42 | 18 | 7 | 17 | 65 | 65 | 1.000 | 43 | |
| 10 | Bristol City | 42 | 17 | 7 | 18 | 74 | 70 | 1.057 | 41 | |
| 11 | Swansea Town | 42 | 16 | 9 | 17 | 79 | 81 | 0.975 | 41 | |
| 12 | Brighton & Hove Albion | 42 | 15 | 11 | 16 | 74 | 90 | 0.822 | 41 | |
| 13 | Middlesbrough | 42 | 15 | 10 | 17 | 87 | 71 | 1.225 | 40 | |
| 14 | Huddersfield Town | 42 | 16 | 8 | 18 | 62 | 55 | 1.127 | 40 | |
| 15 | Sunderland | 42 | 16 | 8 | 18 | 64 | 75 | 0.853 | 40 | |
| 16 | Ipswich Town | 42 | 17 | 6 | 19 | 62 | 77 | 0.805 | 40 | |
| 17 | Leyton Orient | 42 | 14 | 8 | 20 | 71 | 78 | 0.910 | 36 | |
| 18 | Scunthorpe United | 42 | 12 | 9 | 21 | 55 | 84 | 0.655 | 33 | |
| 19 | Lincoln City | 42 | 11 | 7 | 24 | 63 | 93 | 0.677 | 29 | |
| 20 | Rotherham United | 42 | 10 | 9 | 23 | 42 | 82 | 0.512 | 29 | |
| 21 | Grimsby Town (R) | 42 | 9 | 10 | 23 | 62 | 90 | 0.689 | 28 | Relegation to the Third Division |
| 22 | Barnsley (R) | 42 | 10 | 7 | 25 | 55 | 91 | 0.604 | 27 | Relegation to the Third Division |

Rules for classification: 1) Points; 2) Goal average; 3) Goals scored
(C) Champions; (P) Promoted; (R) Relegated

=== Results ===
| Home \ Away | BAR | B&HA | BRI | BRR | CAR | CHA | DER | FUL | GRI | HUD | IPS | LEY | LIN | LIV | MID | ROT | SCU | SHU | SHW | STK | SUN | SWA |
|---|---|---|---|---|---|---|---|---|---|---|---|---|---|---|---|---|---|---|---|---|---|---|
| Barnsley | | 0–2 | 4–7 | 0–0 | 3–2 | 7–1 | 0–0 | 2–4 | 3–1 | 1–0 | 3–0 | 1–3 | 2–2 | 0–2 | 1–0 | 1–1 | 0–1 | 1–3 | 0–1 | 2–1 | 0–2 | 3–1 |
| Brighton & Hove Albion | 1–1 | | 2–2 | 1–1 | 2–2 | 2–2 | 3–1 | 3–0 | 2–0 | 2–0 | 4–1 | 2–2 | 2–1 | 2–2 | 4–6 | 3–0 | 2–0 | 2–0 | 1–3 | 2–2 | 2–0 | 2–2 |
| Bristol City | 3–1 | 3–0 | | 1–1 | 2–3 | 2–4 | 1–3 | 1–1 | 1–0 | 2–1 | 3–0 | 0–1 | 1–0 | 1–3 | 2–2 | 6–1 | 0–1 | 3–1 | 1–2 | 2–1 | 4–1 | 4–0 |
| Bristol Rovers | 0–2 | 2–0 | 1–2 | | 2–0 | 2–1 | 2–1 | 0–0 | 7–3 | 1–1 | 1–1 | 1–3 | 3–0 | 3–0 | 3–1 | 4–1 | 4–0 | 1–1 | 2–1 | 1–0 | 2–1 | 4–4 |
| Cardiff City | 0–1 | 3–1 | 1–0 | 2–4 | | 1–2 | 0–0 | 1–2 | 4–1 | 3–2 | 1–2 | 2–1 | 3–0 | 3–0 | 3–2 | 1–0 | 0–2 | 3–1 | 2–2 | 2–1 | 2–1 | 0–1 |
| Charlton Athletic | 4–0 | 2–3 | 4–1 | 4–3 | 0–0 | | 1–2 | 2–1 | 2–1 | 2–1 | 5–1 | 4–1 | 3–2 | 2–3 | 1–0 | 5–2 | 2–3 | 1–1 | 3–3 | 1–2 | 3–2 | 2–1 |
| Derby County | 3–0 | 1–3 | 4–1 | 3–2 | 1–3 | 3–2 | | 2–0 | 3–0 | 3–1 | 3–2 | 1–2 | 1–0 | 3–2 | 0–3 | 1–1 | 3–1 | 2–1 | 1–4 | 3–0 | 2–0 | 3–1 |
| Fulham | 5–2 | 3–1 | 1–0 | 1–0 | 2–1 | 2–1 | 4–2 | | 3–0 | 1–0 | 3–2 | 5–2 | 4–2 | 0–1 | 3–2 | 4–0 | 1–1 | 4–2 | 6–2 | 6–1 | 6–2 | 1–2 |
| Grimsby Town | 3–3 | 1–1 | 2–0 | 1–2 | 5–1 | 1–5 | 3–0 | 2–2 | | 2–1 | 2–3 | 4–1 | 4–2 | 2–3 | 3–2 | 1–1 | 1–1 | 1–2 | 0–2 | 2–2 | 1–1 | 0–1 |
| Huddersfield Town | 2–1 | 3–2 | 0–1 | 1–2 | 3–0 | 1–0 | 1–1 | 2–1 | 2–0 | | 3–0 | 0–0 | 2–1 | 5–0 | 5–1 | 3–0 | 0–1 | 0–2 | 1–2 | 1–2 | 1–1 | 3–2 |
| Ipswich Town | 3–1 | 5–3 | 1–1 | 0–2 | 3–3 | 3–1 | 1–1 | 1–2 | 2–1 | 0–0 | | 2–1 | 4–1 | 2–0 | 2–1 | 1–0 | 3–1 | 1–0 | 0–2 | 0–2 | 0–2 | 3–2 |
| Leyton Orient | 5–1 | 2–2 | 4–2 | 1–3 | 3–0 | 6–1 | 1–3 | 0–2 | 0–1 | 2–5 | 2–0 | | 0–0 | 1–3 | 5–2 | 2–0 | 2–1 | 1–1 | 0–2 | 0–1 | 6–0 | 0–0 |
| Lincoln City | 2–1 | 4–2 | 0–2 | 4–1 | 4–2 | 3–3 | 1–4 | 2–4 | 4–4 | 1–1 | 3–1 | 2–0 | | 2–1 | 1–1 | 1–0 | 3–3 | 1–2 | 0–1 | 3–1 | 3–1 | 1–2 |
| Liverpool | 3–2 | 5–0 | 3–2 | 2–1 | 1–2 | 3–0 | 3–0 | 0–0 | 3–3 | 2–2 | 3–1 | 3–0 | 3–2 | | 1–2 | 4–0 | 3–0 | 2–1 | 3–2 | 3–4 | 3–1 | 4–0 |
| Middlesbrough | 3–1 | 9–0 | 0–0 | 2–2 | 1–1 | 1–3 | 5–0 | 2–3 | 1–0 | 3–1 | 2–3 | 4–2 | 1–2 | 2–1 | | 1–2 | 6–1 | 0–0 | 2–2 | 0–0 | 0–0 | 6–2 |
| Rotherham United | 3–0 | 0–1 | 1–2 | 3–3 | 1–0 | 4–3 | 3–0 | 4–0 | 2–1 | 0–1 | 1–2 | 1–1 | 1–0 | 0–1 | 1–4 | | 1–0 | 2–2 | 1–0 | 0–0 | 0–4 | 3–3 |
| Scunthorpe United | 1–0 | 2–3 | 3–3 | 0–0 | 1–0 | 3–3 | 2–2 | 1–2 | 1–3 | 0–3 | 1–1 | 2–0 | 3–1 | 1–2 | 0–3 | 2–0 | | 1–3 | 1–4 | 1–1 | 3–2 | 3–1 |
| Sheffield United | 5–0 | 3–1 | 4–0 | 5–2 | 1–1 | 5–0 | 1–2 | 2–0 | 2–1 | 0–0 | 2–0 | 2–3 | 6–1 | 2–0 | 0–1 | 2–0 | 4–1 | | 1–0 | 2–1 | 3–1 | 2–0 |
| Sheffield Wednesday | 5–0 | 2–0 | 2–3 | 3–1 | 3–1 | 4–1 | 1–1 | 2–2 | 6–0 | 4–1 | 3–1 | 2–0 | 7–0 | 1–0 | 2–0 | 5–0 | 2–0 | 2–0 | | 4–1 | 6–0 | 2–1 |
| Stoke City | 2–1 | 3–0 | 2–1 | 2–2 | 0–1 | 2–1 | 2–1 | 4–1 | 4–0 | 5–1 | 1–0 | 3–2 | 1–0 | 0–2 | 3–1 | 3–0 | 4–3 | 1–2 | 3–0 | | 0–0 | 3–0 |
| Sunderland | 2–2 | 4–1 | 3–1 | 3–1 | 0–2 | 0–3 | 3–0 | 1–2 | 1–0 | 1–0 | 0–2 | 4–0 | 2–0 | 2–1 | 0–0 | 1–1 | 3–1 | 4–1 | 3–3 | 3–1 | | 2–1 |
| Swansea Town | 2–1 | 4–2 | 1–0 | 2–1 | 1–3 | 2–2 | 4–4 | 1–2 | 1–1 | 0–1 | 4–2 | 3–3 | 3–1 | 3–3 | 5–2 | 3–0 | 3–0 | 0–2 | 4–0 | 1–0 | 5–0 | |

Updated to match(es) played on unknown. Source: Ian Laschke: Rothmans Book of Football League Records 1888–89 to 1978–79. Macdonald and Jane’s, London & Sydney, 1980.
Legend: Blue = home team win; Yellow = draw; Red = away team win.

=== Maps ===
Locations of the Football League Second Division London teams 1958–1959
Locations of the Football League Second Division 1958–1959 teams

== Third Division ==
Football League Third Division
- Season: 1958–59
- Champions: Plymouth Argyle (1st title)
- Promoted: Hull City
- Relegated: Doncaster Rovers, Notts County, Rochdale; Stockport County
- Matches: 552
- Goals: 1,733 (3.14 per match)
- Top goalscorer: Jim Towers (Brentford), 32

| Pos | Team | Pld | W | D | L | GF | GA | GAv | Pts | Promotion or relegation |
|---|---|---|---|---|---|---|---|---|---|---|
| 1 | Plymouth Argyle (C, P) | 46 | 23 | 16 | 7 | 89 | 59 | 1.508 | 62 | Promotion to the Second Division |
| 2 | Hull City (P) | 46 | 26 | 9 | 11 | 90 | 55 | 1.636 | 61 | Promotion to the Second Division |
| 3 | Brentford | 46 | 21 | 15 | 10 | 76 | 49 | 1.551 | 57 | |
| 4 | Norwich City | 46 | 22 | 13 | 11 | 89 | 62 | 1.435 | 57 | |
| 5 | Colchester United | 46 | 21 | 10 | 15 | 71 | 67 | 1.060 | 52 | |
| 6 | Reading | 46 | 21 | 8 | 17 | 78 | 63 | 1.238 | 50 | |
| 7 | Tranmere Rovers | 46 | 21 | 8 | 17 | 82 | 67 | 1.224 | 50 | |
| 8 | Southend United | 46 | 21 | 8 | 17 | 85 | 80 | 1.063 | 50 | |
| 9 | Halifax Town | 46 | 21 | 8 | 17 | 80 | 77 | 1.039 | 50 | |
| 10 | Bury | 46 | 17 | 14 | 15 | 69 | 58 | 1.190 | 48 | |
| 11 | Bradford City | 46 | 18 | 11 | 17 | 84 | 76 | 1.105 | 47 | |
| 12 | Bournemouth & Boscombe Athletic | 46 | 17 | 12 | 17 | 69 | 69 | 1.000 | 46 | |
| 13 | Queens Park Rangers | 46 | 19 | 8 | 19 | 74 | 77 | 0.961 | 46 | |
| 14 | Southampton | 46 | 17 | 11 | 18 | 88 | 80 | 1.100 | 45 | |
| 15 | Swindon Town | 46 | 16 | 13 | 17 | 59 | 57 | 1.035 | 45 | |
| 16 | Chesterfield | 46 | 17 | 10 | 19 | 67 | 64 | 1.047 | 44 | |
| 17 | Newport County | 46 | 17 | 9 | 20 | 69 | 68 | 1.015 | 43 | |
| 18 | Wrexham | 46 | 14 | 14 | 18 | 63 | 77 | 0.818 | 42 | |
| 19 | Accrington Stanley | 46 | 15 | 12 | 19 | 71 | 87 | 0.816 | 42 | |
| 20 | Mansfield Town | 46 | 14 | 13 | 19 | 73 | 98 | 0.745 | 41 | |
| 21 | Stockport County (R) | 46 | 13 | 10 | 23 | 65 | 78 | 0.833 | 36 | Relegation to the Fourth Division |
| 22 | Doncaster Rovers (R) | 46 | 14 | 5 | 27 | 50 | 90 | 0.556 | 33 | Relegation to the Fourth Division |
| 23 | Notts County (R) | 46 | 8 | 13 | 25 | 55 | 96 | 0.573 | 29 | Relegation to the Fourth Division |
| 24 | Rochdale (R) | 46 | 8 | 12 | 26 | 37 | 79 | 0.468 | 28 | Relegation to the Fourth Division |

(C) Champions; (P) Promoted; (R) Relegated

=== Results ===
| Home \ Away | ACC | B&BA | BRA | BRE | BRY | CHF | COL | DON | HAL | HUL | MAN | NPC | NWC | NTC | PLY | QPR | REA | ROC | SOU | STD | STP | SWI | TRA | WRE |
|---|---|---|---|---|---|---|---|---|---|---|---|---|---|---|---|---|---|---|---|---|---|---|---|---|
| Accrington Stanley | | 3–2 | 1–3 | 1–1 | 0–2 | 3–1 | 1–1 | 2–0 | 4–2 | 0–1 | 2–0 | 2–2 | 0–2 | 3–0 | 1–1 | 2–4 | 4–3 | 4–2 | 0–0 | 3–0 | 2–2 | 0–0 | 3–1 | 1–1 |
| Bournemouth & Boscombe Athletic | 5–2 | | 4–0 | 0–0 | 2–0 | 2–1 | 1–1 | 1–0 | 3–0 | 1–0 | 3–3 | 1–1 | 2–0 | 0–0 | 1–1 | 2–0 | 0–1 | 0–0 | 2–1 | 1–4 | 2–0 | 3–3 | 4–0 | 0–0 |
| Bradford City | 0–0 | 0–1 | | 3–0 | 1–0 | 1–0 | 1–3 | 3–0 | 1–3 | 2–1 | 1–1 | 1–0 | 2–2 | 4–1 | 0–0 | 1–0 | 1–2 | 7–1 | 2–3 | 6–1 | 4–2 | 1–2 | 2–0 | 3–2 |
| Brentford | 2–1 | 1–1 | 4–0 | | 0–0 | 1–1 | 2–1 | 0–1 | 2–0 | 1–1 | 2–0 | 3–0 | 0–4 | 4–0 | 3–0 | 1–0 | 3–1 | 2–1 | 2–0 | 6–1 | 1–4 | 2–2 | 5–2 | 2–1 |
| Bury | 3–1 | 5–1 | 2–2 | 1–1 | | 1–0 | 0–0 | 5–0 | 3–1 | 2–1 | 2–2 | 0–0 | 3–2 | 0–1 | 1–1 | 3–1 | 1–1 | 6–1 | 1–0 | 2–3 | 3–3 | 0–0 | 4–2 | 3–0 |
| Chesterfield | 0–1 | 1–0 | 2–0 | 1–2 | 3–0 | | 2–2 | 2–0 | 2–3 | 2–1 | 3–1 | 3–1 | 1–1 | 1–0 | 1–2 | 2–3 | 1–0 | 0–0 | 3–3 | 4–0 | 1–0 | 1–3 | 3–2 | 1–1 |
| Colchester United | 1–0 | 3–1 | 3–2 | 0–4 | 1–3 | 1–0 | | 1–0 | 3–1 | 1–3 | 1–3 | 3–2 | 2–1 | 4–1 | 2–0 | 3–0 | 3–1 | 2–1 | 1–3 | 0–1 | 8–2 | 1–0 | 1–1 | 1–1 |
| Doncaster Rovers | 3–0 | 5–1 | 0–3 | 1–0 | 0–1 | 2–1 | 2–1 | | 1–2 | 0–2 | 0–2 | 1–0 | 0–1 | 2–1 | 4–6 | 2–0 | 2–5 | 1–1 | 3–2 | 2–1 | 4–1 | 2–0 | 2–0 | 1–1 |
| Halifax Town | 0–2 | 0–1 | 3–3 | 0–0 | 4–2 | 3–2 | 4–1 | 5–1 | | 1–2 | 0–0 | 3–1 | 1–1 | 1–1 | 0–1 | 2–1 | 4–1 | 2–1 | 2–0 | 1–0 | 4–3 | 1–0 | 3–0 | 4–1 |
| Hull City | 4–2 | 5–3 | 4–0 | 3–1 | 2–0 | 3–1 | 3–0 | 5–1 | 4–0 | | 5–2 | 2–3 | 3–3 | 5–0 | 1–1 | 1–0 | 2–0 | 2–1 | 3–0 | 3–2 | 3–1 | 0–0 | 1–0 | 1–0 |
| Mansfield Town | 3–2 | 1–4 | 2–1 | 1–1 | 0–2 | 2–1 | 3–2 | 3–1 | 4–3 | 1–1 | | 2–1 | 1–1 | 3–0 | 1–4 | 3–4 | 1–0 | 0–0 | 1–6 | 1–4 | 2–1 | 0–0 | 0–2 | 3–1 |
| Newport County | 2–1 | 4–1 | 3–2 | 0–1 | 1–1 | 0–1 | 0–1 | 3–1 | 0–2 | 1–3 | 1–0 | | 2–2 | 3–1 | 0–1 | 3–1 | 2–1 | 1–0 | 4–2 | 3–1 | 2–0 | 3–0 | 3–0 | 2–1 |
| Norwich City | 2–4 | 2–2 | 4–2 | 4–1 | 3–2 | 2–1 | 1–2 | 3–0 | 3–1 | 0–1 | 1–0 | 3–0 | | 3–3 | 1–1 | 5–1 | 1–0 | 2–1 | 3–1 | 4–0 | 1–3 | 1–1 | 0–0 | 2–2 |
| Notts County | 1–1 | 4–3 | 1–3 | 0–0 | 1–1 | 3–1 | 0–1 | 2–2 | 4–4 | 1–1 | 3–4 | 1–1 | 1–3 | | 1–2 | 0–1 | 3–1 | 1–1 | 1–2 | 1–4 | 0–2 | 1–0 | 1–1 | 2–0 |
| Plymouth Argyle | 2–4 | 3–1 | 1–1 | 1–1 | 3–0 | 2–0 | 1–1 | 4–0 | 1–1 | 1–1 | 8–3 | 3–2 | 0–1 | 3–0 | | 3–2 | 2–2 | 2–1 | 1–0 | 3–1 | 2–1 | 3–2 | 4–0 | 2–2 |
| Queens Park Rangers | 3–1 | 0–4 | 3–0 | 1–2 | 2–1 | 2–2 | 4–2 | 3–1 | 3–1 | 1–1 | 1–1 | 4–2 | 2–1 | 2–1 | 2–1 | | 2–0 | 3–0 | 2–2 | 1–3 | 0–0 | 2–1 | 1–1 | 5–0 |
| Reading | 5–0 | 2–0 | 3–2 | 3–1 | 1–0 | 1–2 | 0–0 | 2–0 | 3–0 | 2–0 | 3–3 | 1–3 | 3–1 | 3–1 | 0–2 | 2–2 | | 3–0 | 4–1 | 3–0 | 2–1 | 3–1 | 0–0 | 2–1 |
| Rochdale | 1–0 | 2–1 | 0–3 | 0–0 | 1–0 | 0–0 | 0–1 | 1–0 | 1–0 | 0–1 | 2–2 | 1–1 | 1–2 | 1–2 | 0–2 | 2–2 | 1–0 | | 1–0 | 1–1 | 0–2 | 1–1 | 1–4 | 3–1 |
| Southampton | 3–1 | 0–0 | 1–2 | 0–6 | 4–2 | 0–0 | 3–0 | 1–1 | 5–0 | 6–1 | 3–2 | 3–3 | 1–1 | 3–0 | 5–1 | 1–0 | 3–3 | 6–1 | | 3–2 | 2–1 | 1–1 | 2–3 | 1–2 |
| Southend | 4–2 | 2–0 | 1–1 | 2–0 | 1–0 | 2–5 | 1–1 | 5–0 | 3–2 | 1–1 | 5–1 | 1–0 | 1–0 | 5–2 | 0–0 | 4–0 | 2–2 | 3–1 | 1–1 | | 3–1 | 0–2 | 1–3 | 4–1 |
| Stockport County | 0–0 | 3–1 | 1–1 | 1–1 | 0–1 | 1–1 | 0–1 | 2–0 | 0–1 | 2–1 | 4–1 | 2–1 | 2–3 | 1–1 | 2–2 | 2–3 | 0–1 | 1–0 | 4–0 | 0–1 | | 2–0 | 1–0 | 2–2 |
| Swindon Town | 1–2 | 0–1 | 2–2 | 1–1 | 0–0 | 1–2 | 2–0 | 0–0 | 0–2 | 2–0 | 2–1 | 2–1 | 4–3 | 3–1 | 3–4 | 2–0 | 2–0 | 2–1 | 3–1 | 2–1 | 3–0 | | 1–2 | 1–0 |
| Tranmere | 9–0 | 4–0 | 3–1 | 1–2 | 4–0 | 2–0 | 3–3 | 3–0 | 1–2 | 1–0 | 2–2 | 2–1 | 0–1 | 0–3 | 2–0 | 2–0 | 2–1 | 2–1 | 2–0 | 1–1 | 3–1 | 3–1 | | 1–2 |
| Wrexham | 2–2 | 1–0 | 3–3 | 2–1 | 0–0 | 3–4 | 2–0 | 2–1 | 1–1 | 5–1 | 2–1 | 0–0 | 1–2 | 3–2 | 1–1 | 1–0 | 0–1 | 1–0 | 1–3 | 3–1 | 3–1 | 1–0 | 2–5 | |

Updated to match(es) played on unknown. Source: Ian Laschke: Rothmans Book of Football League Records 1888–89 to 1978–79. Macdonald and Jane’s, London & Sydney, 1980.
Legend: Blue = home team win; Yellow = draw; Red = away team win.

=== Maps ===
Locations of the Football League Third Division London teams 1958–1959
Locations of the Football League Third Division teams 1958–1959

== Fourth Division ==
Football League Fourth Division
- Season: 1958–59
- Champions: Port Vale (1st title)
- Promoted: Coventry City, York City; Shrewsbury Town
- Failed re-election: none
- Matches: 552
- Goals: 1,794 (3.25 per match)
- Top goalscorer: Arthur Rowley (Shrewsbury Town), 37

| Pos | Team | Pld | W | D | L | GF | GA | GAv | Pts | Promotion or relegation |
|---|---|---|---|---|---|---|---|---|---|---|
| 1 | Port Vale (C, P) | 46 | 26 | 12 | 8 | 110 | 58 | 1.897 | 64 | Promotion to the Third Division |
| 2 | Coventry City (P) | 46 | 24 | 12 | 10 | 84 | 47 | 1.787 | 60 | Promotion to the Third Division |
| 3 | York City (P) | 46 | 21 | 18 | 7 | 73 | 52 | 1.404 | 60 | Promotion to the Third Division |
| 4 | Shrewsbury Town (P) | 46 | 24 | 10 | 12 | 101 | 63 | 1.603 | 58 | Promotion to the Third Division |
| 5 | Exeter City | 46 | 23 | 11 | 12 | 87 | 61 | 1.426 | 57 | |
| 6 | Walsall | 46 | 21 | 10 | 15 | 95 | 64 | 1.484 | 52 | |
| 7 | Crystal Palace | 46 | 20 | 12 | 14 | 90 | 71 | 1.268 | 52 | |
| 8 | Northampton Town | 46 | 21 | 9 | 16 | 85 | 78 | 1.090 | 51 | |
| 9 | Millwall | 46 | 20 | 10 | 16 | 76 | 69 | 1.101 | 50 | |
| 10 | Carlisle United | 46 | 19 | 12 | 15 | 62 | 65 | 0.954 | 50 | |
| 11 | Gillingham | 46 | 20 | 9 | 17 | 82 | 77 | 1.065 | 49 | |
| 12 | Torquay United | 46 | 16 | 12 | 18 | 78 | 77 | 1.013 | 44 | |
| 13 | Chester | 46 | 16 | 12 | 18 | 72 | 84 | 0.857 | 44 | |
| 14 | Bradford (Park Avenue) | 46 | 18 | 7 | 21 | 75 | 77 | 0.974 | 43 | |
| 15 | Watford | 46 | 16 | 10 | 20 | 81 | 79 | 1.025 | 42 | |
| 16 | Darlington | 46 | 13 | 16 | 17 | 66 | 68 | 0.971 | 42 | |
| 17 | Workington | 46 | 12 | 17 | 17 | 63 | 78 | 0.808 | 41 | |
| 18 | Crewe Alexandra | 46 | 15 | 10 | 21 | 70 | 82 | 0.854 | 40 | |
| 19 | Hartlepools United | 46 | 15 | 10 | 21 | 74 | 88 | 0.841 | 40 | |
| 20 | Gateshead | 46 | 16 | 8 | 22 | 56 | 85 | 0.659 | 40 | |
| 21 | Oldham Athletic | 46 | 16 | 4 | 26 | 59 | 84 | 0.702 | 36 | Re-elected |
| 22 | Aldershot | 46 | 14 | 7 | 25 | 63 | 97 | 0.649 | 35 | Re-elected |
| 23 | Barrow | 46 | 9 | 10 | 27 | 51 | 104 | 0.490 | 28 | Re-elected |
| 24 | Southport | 46 | 7 | 12 | 27 | 41 | 86 | 0.477 | 26 | Re-elected |

Source: rsssf.com
(C) Division Champions; (P) Promoted

=== Results ===
| Home \ Away | ALD | BRW | BPA | CRL | CHE | COV | CRE | CRY | DAR | EXE | GAT | GIL | HAR | MIL | NOR | OLD | PTV | SHR | SOU | TOR | WAL | WAT | WRK | YOR |
|---|---|---|---|---|---|---|---|---|---|---|---|---|---|---|---|---|---|---|---|---|---|---|---|---|
| Aldershot | | 0–1 | 3–3 | 4–0 | 1–0 | 0–4 | 0–0 | 1–2 | 1–4 | 1–0 | 8–1 | 4–2 | 2–4 | 4–2 | 1–3 | 1–3 | 0–4 | 0–0 | 3–2 | 1–4 | 0–5 | 0–0 | 2–0 | 0–1 |
| Barrow | 3–4 | | 2–3 | 1–3 | 1–2 | 0–3 | 0–2 | 1–0 | 2–1 | 1–0 | 0–3 | 2–2 | 1–1 | 3–1 | 2–2 | 2–1 | 1–2 | 3–4 | 3–0 | 2–2 | 0–0 | 0–4 | 2–2 | 2–3 |
| Bradford Park Avenue | 5–1 | 0–2 | | 0–3 | 3–0 | 2–0 | 0–2 | 5–0 | 1–2 | 0–3 | 4–1 | 2–0 | 4–1 | 4–1 | 1–2 | 2–1 | 0–2 | 3–1 | 3–0 | 3–1 | 3–2 | 1–1 | 3–2 | 2–1 |
| Carlisle United | 1–0 | 1–0 | 1–1 | | 4–3 | 1–6 | 2–0 | 3–3 | 1–1 | 1–2 | 4–2 | 1–2 | 1–0 | 0–2 | 2–1 | 3–0 | 0–3 | 0–0 | 5–0 | 0–1 | 1–1 | 2–0 | 3–2 | 0–0 |
| Chester | 2–2 | 2–0 | 2–0 | 2–1 | | 1–1 | 0–1 | 3–2 | 1–0 | 4–2 | 0–1 | 1–2 | 1–1 | 0–0 | 2–3 | 5–2 | 1–2 | 3–5 | 2–1 | 0–2 | 2–0 | 2–1 | 1–2 | 2–2 |
| Coventry City | 7–1 | 2–0 | 0–0 | 1–2 | 5–1 | | 3–2 | 2–0 | 0–0 | 2–0 | 4–1 | 1–1 | 4–1 | 1–0 | 2–0 | 1–0 | 1–0 | 3–2 | 1–0 | 3–0 | 0–0 | 1–0 | 4–0 | 2–0 |
| Crewe Alexandra | 5–0 | 5–0 | 4–1 | 3–1 | 2–4 | 1–1 | | 4–1 | 2–1 | 0–0 | 0–0 | 0–2 | 0–2 | 4–1 | 1–2 | 5–0 | 2–0 | 2–4 | 1–1 | 1–1 | 5–3 | 1–3 | 2–0 | 2–4 |
| Crystal Palace | 4–1 | 2–2 | 2–0 | 0–2 | 3–3 | 1–1 | 6–2 | | 4–1 | 1–1 | 3–1 | 4–1 | 1–2 | 4–0 | 1–1 | 4–0 | 1–1 | 4–3 | 1–0 | 3–1 | 1–3 | 3–0 | 1–1 | 0–0 |
| Darlington | 2–3 | 5–2 | 1–1 | 0–1 | 0–0 | 1–4 | 1–1 | 1–4 | | 1–1 | 3–2 | 1–2 | 3–1 | 0–2 | 2–2 | 1–1 | 2–0 | 2–1 | 4–0 | 3–2 | 2–3 | 1–1 | 1–1 | 0–1 |
| Exeter City | 2–0 | 4–0 | 4–0 | 2–1 | 1–1 | 2–1 | 3–0 | 3–1 | 2–2 | | 1–1 | 3–0 | 3–0 | 3–1 | 3–4 | 3–2 | 3–4 | 1–0 | 3–2 | 2–2 | 3–0 | 3–0 | 1–0 | 0–2 |
| Gateshead | 1–0 | 4–0 | 1–4 | 4–1 | 0–1 | 1–1 | 0–0 | 1–3 | 1–3 | 1–2 | | 2–0 | 3–0 | 1–2 | 4–1 | 2–1 | 0–4 | 1–2 | 1–1 | 1–0 | 2–1 | 1–0 | 0–3 | 1–0 |
| Gillingham | 3–0 | 4–2 | 1–1 | 1–1 | 3–3 | 2–0 | 3–0 | 1–1 | 0–0 | 0–2 | 3–0 | | 4–1 | 1–2 | 4–1 | 3–2 | 0–2 | 2–1 | 2–0 | 3–2 | 4–2 | 2–1 | 5–1 | 2–2 |
| Hartlepool | 0–3 | 10–1 | 3–0 | 1–2 | 1–3 | 2–1 | 2–1 | 4–1 | 1–0 | 3–3 | 0–0 | 3–1 | | 3–1 | 3–0 | 4–0 | 1–5 | 0–2 | 1–1 | 2–4 | 1–1 | 4–3 | 0–3 | 1–5 |
| Millwall | 4–0 | 3–0 | 1–1 | 1–0 | 0–1 | 1–1 | 2–0 | 2–1 | 1–2 | 1–1 | 0–2 | 2–0 | 3–2 | | 3–0 | 4–2 | 4–2 | 0–0 | 1–1 | 2–0 | 1–3 | 4–1 | 1–1 | 5–2 |
| Northampton Town | 1–0 | 2–0 | 4–1 | 0–0 | 4–0 | 4–0 | 3–0 | 3–0 | 1–3 | 1–1 | 1–0 | 4–2 | 2–1 | 0–1 | | 2–1 | 2–4 | 3–3 | 3–1 | 1–1 | 3–2 | 2–1 | 1–1 | 1–2 |
| Oldham Athletic | 0–1 | 2–0 | 1–0 | 2–0 | 3–5 | 2–0 | 2–1 | 3–0 | 1–3 | 2–1 | 3–0 | 3–1 | 1–0 | 1–3 | 2–1 | | 0–2 | 3–1 | 2–0 | 1–0 | 1–4 | 3–5 | 1–0 | 0–1 |
| Port Vale | 3–2 | 4–1 | 4–2 | 1–1 | 4–0 | 3–0 | 1–1 | 2–3 | 1–1 | 5–3 | 8–0 | 3–1 | 1–1 | 5–2 | 1–4 | 0–0 | | 2–0 | 4–1 | 3–1 | 2–1 | 1–3 | 2–0 | 2–2 |
| Shrewsbury Town | 3–1 | 1–2 | 0–1 | 4–1 | 3–0 | 4–1 | 2–2 | 2–1 | 1–0 | 3–0 | 1–1 | 3–2 | 3–0 | 1–2 | 4–0 | 0–0 | 4–3 | | 6–2 | 5–0 | 2–0 | 4–2 | 1–1 | 2–2 |
| Southport | 0–1 | 0–0 | 1–0 | 0–1 | 1–1 | 1–2 | 3–0 | 0–2 | 2–0 | 0–1 | 2–2 | 2–1 | 1–1 | 2–1 | 1–2 | 1–1 | 2–2 | 0–1 | | 2–2 | 1–1 | 0–3 | 3–0 | 1–0 |
| Torquay United | 1–1 | 1–0 | 2–1 | 0–0 | 4–0 | 1–1 | 6–2 | 0–2 | 4–1 | 3–4 | 0–1 | 3–1 | 1–3 | 2–0 | 4–2 | 2–1 | 1–1 | 1–4 | 1–0 | | 1–2 | 2–3 | 4–1 | 1–1 |
| Walsall | 2–4 | 3–1 | 3–2 | 5–0 | 2–2 | 3–0 | 6–0 | 0–2 | 0–0 | 3–0 | 0–1 | 1–2 | 0–0 | 2–1 | 2–1 | 3–0 | 1–1 | 2–3 | 5–1 | 2–2 | | 3–2 | 3–0 | 5–0 |
| Watford | 2–1 | 1–1 | 2–1 | 2–2 | 4–2 | 1–4 | 0–1 | 2–2 | 0–0 | 2–1 | 5–1 | 2–2 | 4–1 | 1–1 | 3–1 | 2–1 | 0–2 | 1–4 | 5–1 | 1–2 | 1–2 | | 3–0 | 2–3 |
| Workington | 1–0 | 2–2 | 2–1 | 0–1 | 1–0 | 2–2 | 1–0 | 0–4 | 3–3 | 2–2 | 4–2 | 0–1 | 3–0 | 1–1 | 3–3 | 2–0 | 2–2 | 1–1 | 2–0 | 3–3 | 0–1 | 3–1 | | 2–2 |
| York City | 0–0 | 1–0 | 4–0 | 1–1 | 1–1 | 0–0 | 4–0 | 1–1 | 2–1 | 0–2 | 1–0 | 3–1 | 1–1 | 3–3 | 2–1 | 3–1 | 0–0 | 2–0 | 2–0 | 1–0 | 3–2 | 0–0 | 2–2 | |

Updated to match(es) played on unknown. Source: Ian Laschke: Rothmans Book of Football League Records 1888–89 to 1978–79. Macdonald and Jane’s, London & Sydney, 1980.
Legend: Blue = home team win; Yellow = draw; Red = away team win.
- The match between Watford and Shrewsbury Town on the 28th of April 1959 was abandoned after 74 minutes due to floodlight failure, with Shrewbsury leading 4-1. It was discovered that the fuses for the floodlights had been deliberately removed. The match was replayed on the 7th of May, with Shrewsbury winning 4-1.

=== Maps ===
Locations of the Football League Fourth Division London teams 1958–1959
Locations of the Football League Fourth Division teams 1958–1959

== Attendances ==
=== Division One ===
| No. | Club | Average | ± | Highest | Lowest |
|---|---|---|---|---|---|
| 1 | Manchester United | 53,258 | 15.6% | 65,187 | 38,482 |
| 2 | Arsenal FC | 45,227 | 13.5% | 67,162 | 24,369 |
| 3 | Chelsea FC | 40,857 | 6.3% | 62,118 | 24,356 |
| 4 | Tottenham Hotspur FC | 40,453 | -5.8% | 60,241 | 27,237 |
| 5 | Newcastle United FC | 39,458 | 8.9% | 60,670 | 17,451 |
| 6 | Everton FC | 39,171 | 0.0% | 64,079 | 23,875 |
| 7 | Wolverhampton Wanderers FC | 38,439 | 3.0% | 52,656 | 26,790 |
| 8 | Aston Villa FC | 33,880 | 17.5% | 56,450 | 21,684 |
| 9 | Manchester City FC | 32,568 | -0.6% | 62,912 | 16,405 |
| 10 | West Bromwich Albion FC | 31,398 | -3.1% | 48,771 | 16,950 |
| 11 | Blackburn Rovers FC | 30,544 | 34.5% | 43,192 | 17,613 |
| 12 | Nottingham Forest FC | 28,717 | -8.3% | 44,971 | 18,339 |
| 13 | West Ham United FC | 28,368 | 14.1% | 37,871 | 21,129 |
| 14 | Leicester City FC | 27,860 | -11.2% | 38,551 | 15,413 |
| 15 | Bolton Wanderers FC | 27,659 | 25.6% | 42,200 | 16,472 |
| 16 | Birmingham City FC | 26,686 | -9.7% | 37,725 | 17,241 |
| 17 | Leeds United FC | 24,905 | -0.1% | 48,574 | 11,257 |
| 18 | Portsmouth FC | 24,016 | -15.7% | 40,470 | 12,714 |
| 19 | Burnley FC | 23,733 | 6.7% | 44,577 | 14,923 |
| 20 | Preston North End FC | 22,435 | -10.3% | 36,435 | 10,548 |
| 21 | Blackpool FC | 20,860 | -2.6% | 36,719 | 11,479 |
| 22 | Luton Town FC | 19,872 | 7.9% | 27,025 | 11,592 |

=== Division Two ===
| No. | Club | Average | ± | Highest | Lowest |
|---|---|---|---|---|---|
| 1 | Liverpool FC | 36,749 | -4.5% | 52,546 | 13,976 |
| 2 | Sunderland AFC | 27,772 | -23.2% | 45,954 | 12,024 |
| 3 | Sheffield Wednesday FC | 26,982 | 18.6% | 44,591 | 17,017 |
| 4 | Fulham FC | 26,260 | 8.4% | 39,377 | 17,861 |
| 5 | Middlesbrough FC | 24,876 | 2.0% | 42,866 | 12,019 |
| 6 | Brighton & Hove Albion FC | 22,517 | 37.1% | 36,342 | 17,795 |
| 7 | Bristol City FC | 22,506 | 2.0% | 32,378 | 10,369 |
| 8 | Sheffield United FC | 19,580 | 1.7% | 43,915 | 11,306 |
| 9 | Derby County FC | 18,990 | -4.2% | 24,343 | 11,796 |
| 10 | Bristol Rovers FC | 17,890 | -13.2% | 32,129 | 10,004 |
| 11 | Cardiff City FC | 17,776 | 12.2% | 27,146 | 10,734 |
| 12 | Stoke City FC | 17,550 | -14.4% | 30,080 | 6,855 |
| 13 | Charlton Athletic FC | 16,806 | -24.4% | 23,369 | 10,364 |
| 14 | Huddersfield Town AFC | 14,846 | 4.9% | 20,301 | 9,604 |
| 15 | Swansea City AFC | 14,612 | -7.0% | 25,215 | 6,743 |
| 16 | Ipswich Town FC | 14,261 | -22.0% | 19,837 | 10,455 |
| 17 | Leyton Orient FC | 13,323 | -10.2% | 24,431 | 7,772 |
| 18 | Grimsby Town FC | 13,108 | -7.5% | 22,408 | 8,014 |
| 19 | Scunthorpe United FC | 12,377 | 27.9% | 17,488 | 9,035 |
| 20 | Lincoln City FC | 11,334 | 11.7% | 19,631 | 7,041 |
| 21 | Barnsley FC | 11,212 | -19.7% | 23,184 | 4,976 |
| 22 | Rotherham United FC | 10,482 | 3.0% | 18,221 | 6,653 |

=== Division Three ===
| No. | Club | Average | ± | Highest | Lowest |
|---|---|---|---|---|---|
| 1 | Plymouth Argyle FC | 22,926 | 16.6% | 30,665 | 10,099 |
| 2 | Norwich City FC | 21,098 | 4.0% | 29,976 | 13,281 |
| 3 | Hull City AFC | 14,380 | 31.0% | 24,156 | 8,521 |
| 4 | Brentford FC | 13,924 | 6.4% | 28,725 | 9,432 |
| 5 | Southampton FC | 13,717 | -7.6% | 21,893 | 5,782 |
| 6 | Reading FC | 12,674 | -1.0% | 17,841 | 6,588 |
| 7 | Tranmere Rovers | 11,815 | 13.9% | 16,878 | 7,296 |
| 8 | Swindon Town FC | 11,359 | -5.8% | 19,856 | 7,303 |
| 9 | Southend United FC | 11,229 | 0.4% | 15,661 | 5,774 |
| 10 | Bradford City AFC | 11,090 | -11.5% | 16,230 | 6,223 |
| 11 | AFC Bournemouth | 10,680 | -15.4% | 18,448 | 6,381 |
| 12 | Wrexham AFC | 10,338 | 13.8% | 16,905 | 5,244 |
| 13 | Notts County FC | 9,529 | -34.1% | 16,510 | 4,381 |
| 14 | Bury FC | 9,441 | -19.8% | 15,973 | 5,072 |
| 15 | Stockport County FC | 9,255 | -7.4% | 17,315 | 4,060 |
| 16 | Queens Park Rangers FC | 9,155 | -2.5% | 15,768 | 5,007 |
| 17 | Chesterfield FC | 9,028 | 7.7% | 12,774 | 3,419 |
| 18 | Mansfield Town FC | 8,467 | 4.5% | 15,952 | 3,703 |
| 19 | Colchester United FC | 7,756 | -9.4% | 10,033 | 4,404 |
| 20 | Doncaster Rovers FC | 6,664 | -40.1% | 10,725 | 2,786 |
| 21 | Halifax Town AFC | 6,663 | 2.7% | 11,938 | 3,260 |
| 22 | Newport County AFC | 6,606 | -7.9% | 10,968 | 2,447 |
| 23 | Accrington Stanley FC | 6,267 | -12.8% | 9,918 | 3,109 |
| 24 | Rochdale AFC | 4,810 | -24.3% | 8,442 | 2,191 |

=== Division Four ===
| No. | Club | Average | ± | Highest | Lowest |
|---|---|---|---|---|---|
| 1 | Coventry City FC | 16,939 | 42.3% | 28,429 | 10,059 |
| 2 | Crystal Palace FC | 14,885 | 12.5% | 20,707 | 8,848 |
| 3 | Port Vale FC | 12,757 | 22.0% | 20,916 | 8,851 |
| 4 | Millwall FC | 11,855 | -2.1% | 20,446 | 6,446 |
| 5 | Exeter City FC | 9,374 | 20.4% | 13,102 | 6,464 |
| 6 | Walsall FC | 9,072 | 3.1% | 15,152 | 5,125 |
| 7 | Watford FC | 8,384 | 1.2% | 14,156 | 4,182 |
| 8 | York City FC | 8,124 | 11.7% | 10,382 | 5,246 |
| 9 | Northampton Town FC | 8,090 | -0.5% | 14,365 | 3,450 |
| 10 | Shrewsbury Town FC | 8,081 | 13.2% | 15,318 | 4,135 |
| 11 | Crewe Alexandra FC | 7,443 | 62.4% | 15,330 | 4,387 |
| 12 | Carlisle United FC | 7,172 | -15.9% | 11,659 | 3,076 |
| 13 | Bradford Park Avenue AFC | 7,016 | -19.8% | 9,692 | 3,177 |
| 14 | Gillingham FC | 6,928 | -1.5% | 12,023 | 3,817 |
| 15 | Chester City FC | 6,866 | 1.9% | 9,723 | 3,220 |
| 16 | Hartlepool United FC | 5,499 | -30.0% | 9,799 | 3,169 |
| 17 | Torquay United FC | 5,393 | -24.2% | 11,574 | 3,120 |
| 18 | Oldham Athletic FC | 5,322 | -28.7% | 8,400 | 2,671 |
| 19 | Workington AFC | 5,042 | -24.2% | 8,765 | 3,185 |
| 20 | Darlington FC | 5,004 | -6.9% | 9,172 | 1,944 |
| 21 | Barrow AFC | 4,325 | -24.6% | 6,026 | 2,532 |
| 22 | Aldershot Town FC | 4,189 | -16.2% | 6,211 | 2,567 |
| 23 | Gateshead AFC | 4,142 | -12.0% | 7,623 | 2,242 |
| 24 | Southport FC | 3,388 | -10.9% | 4,693 | 2,042 |

== See also ==
- 1958-59 in English football
