= History of Brentford F.C. =

History of an English football club

Brentford Football Club is an English professional football club based in Brentford, Hounslow, London. The club was founded in October 1889, as the local sportsmen's latest attempt to form a permanent football or rugby club in the town. By 1896, Brentford had joined the London League, progressing to the Southern League in 1898 and entering the Football League in 1920.

Upon the appointment of Harry Curtis as manager in 1926 came the beginning of Brentford's most successful period, with promotions in 1933 and 1935 taking the club into the top-flight of English football for the first time in its history. Three consecutive top-six finishes in the First Division established Brentford as one of the top clubs in England, but a decline began in 1938 which led to the club's relegation back to the Third Division South by 1954.

Brentford's rise from the Third Division South to the First Division had come full circle by 1954, with the club back in the bottom-tier for the first time since 1933. After consistently challenging for promotion to the Second Division in the mid-late 1950s, a further decline set in, which led to relegation to the new Fourth Division in 1962 and the club almost went out of existence in 1967. Brentford yo-yoed between the Third and Fourth Divisions through much of the 1960s and 1970s, before finally re-establishing itself in the Third Division after promotion in 1978.

In 1986, Brentford had been rooted in the Third Division since 1978, but the appointment of Steve Perryman as manager in 1987 gave the club new impetus and under his successor Phil Holder, the club finally returned to the second-tier in 1992 after a 38-year wait. Relegation came at the first time of asking and aside from three seasons in the fourth-tier (winning two championships), Brentford remained in the third-tier until 2014, when after five failed playoff campaigns in the preceding 19 years, the club was automatically promoted back to the second-tier. After two failed playoff campaigns in six Championship seasons, Brentford were promoted into the Premier League after victory in the 2021 Championship play-off final.

== Formation and early seasons ==
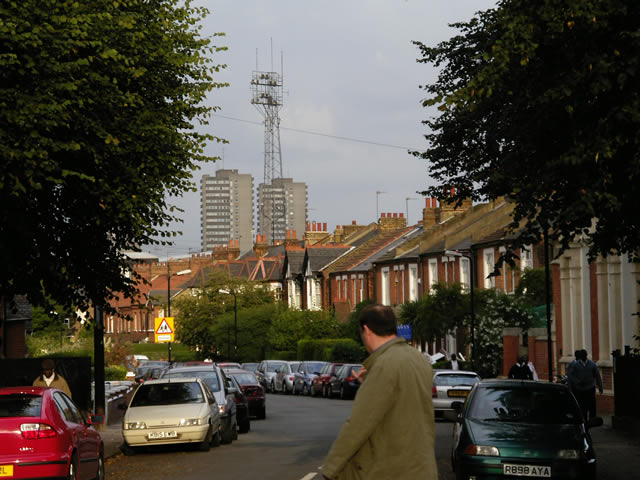
Brentford's first ground was located behind Clifden House, close to Griffin Park. Built for Viscount Clifden, the house was demolished in the 1950s.

=== Founding (1889) ===
In 1889, the town of Brentford, Middlesex was home to the Brentford Rowing Club and Boston Park Cricket Club. Attempts to form football and rugby clubs in the town fell by the wayside until a new recreation ground was opened on 17 October 1889. Seven days earlier, a meeting had taken place at the Oxford & Cambridge pub near Kew Bridge, during which it had been endeavoured between the rowing and cricket club members to decide how best to use the recreation ground, in the hope of forming a permanent football or rugby club in the town. The rowing club's co-founder Archer Green immediately submitted an application to the Chiswick Local Board for the use of the recreation ground and a meeting with the board was called for 15 October. The result was inconclusive and it was decided that the matter would be discussed again at the board's next meeting, three weeks later. Archer Green and fellow rowing club co-founder John Henry Strachan did not wish to wait and pushed to establish a new club.

On 16 October 1889, the rowing club members again met at the Oxford & Cambridge pub and it was voted that the new club would play association football, be named "Brentford Football Club" and wear salmon, claret and light blue colours, the same as that of the rowing club. J. J. K. Curtis was elected as the club's first-ever captain, with J. Hinton Bailey as vice-captain. Archer Green became secretary, with Richard Dennington Beaver, A. Drabble, H. L. Edwardes, H. Gaterell, and C. West elected to form the first committee. John Henry Strachan became one of six vice-presidents. The problem of the club's ground was quickly resolved, with president Edwin Underwood promising the use of a field behind the Local Board offices at Clifden House, Brentford.

=== Cup and friendly matches (1889–1896) ===

The lineup for Brentford's first official match versus Kew, 23 November 1889.

On 26 October 1889, the club staged its first practice match (featuring gentlemen who had paid a 5s annual subscription fee to become members of the club) and on 23 November the club's first competitive match was played versus Kew, which resulted in a 1–1 draw, with T. H. M. Bonell scoring Brentford's goal. From then until the end of the 1889–90 season, friendly matches would be played on most Saturdays. Brentford continued to play friendly matches during the 1890–91 season and entered the West Middlesex Cup, with the club's first ever competitive fixture ending in a 6–0 first round defeat to Southall on 8 November 1890.

The 1892–93 season saw Brentford enter a league for the first time – the West London Alliance – and the club moved to Benn's Field, Little Ealing in October 1892. The team showed excellent form and finished the season top of the division, going undefeated and winning 10 of the 12 matches, but the board decided to against entering for the following season after failing to be awarded a trophy. By now captained by Arthur Charlton (referred to as "probably the club’s first great player"), Brentford won its first competition during the 1894–95 season, defeating 8th Hussars 4–2 in the final of the West Middlesex Cup at Fred Rouse's Field in Southall. It was also during the 1894–95 season that Brentford's original nickname of "The Bs" originated, when friends of amateur forward Joseph Gettins chanted Borough Road College's war-cry "buck up Bs" at a match. The local press interpreted the nickname as "the Bees", which stuck and came to be Brentford's nickname.

=== Election to the London League (1896–1898) ===
Brentford continued to play cup and friendly matches until 1896, when the club was elected into the Second Division of the London League. Buoyed by the goalscoring of Oakey Field and playing in front of an average home attendance of 1,500 at Shotter's Field, the Bees finished second behind Bromley to secure promotion to the First Division after losing just one match all season. Brentford had its finest season yet in its short existence in 1897–98, finishing as runners-up in the London League First Division and winning the London Senior Cup and the Middlesex Senior Cup. The only sour note was that the club had still yet to find a permanent home and finished the season having again lost money due to having to play matches on neutral grounds. Brentford would later re-enter the London League for the 1900–01 season and remained until the end of 1903–04, experiencing little success, due to the club's main focus being on the Southern League competition.

== Southern League ==
=== Second Division (1898–1901) ===
Brentford's London League exploits and its establishment as one of the top amateur clubs in London led to the club's election into the Second Division (London section) of the Southern League for the 1898–99 season. Several key players from the previous season departed (including prolific forward Oakey Field and captain Arthur Charlton) and the club moved to Cross Road near South Ealing station, a ground then occupied by local club Brentford Celtic. Despite secretly paying the new amateur signings more than their travelling expenses to induce them to play (an illegal move), Brentford finished fourth in the 12-team division and made its FA Cup debut, being knocked out at the first time of asking by Clapton in the third qualifying round. A mediocre 1899–1900 season followed, during the middle of which, the club became a professional outfit.

Everything came right for Brentford in the 1900–01 season. Now playing at Boston Park Cricket Ground and under the charge of secretary/manager William Lewis, the squad was overhauled and Peter Turnbull (supported ably by Roddy McLeod, Ralph McElhaney, Joe Turner and E. Andrews) finished the season as the Southern League's top scorer and fired the Bees to the Second Division title. A 0–0 draw with Swindon Town in the promotion/relegation test match meant the Robins would retain their First Division status, but the Brentford won a place in the top-flight in July 1901 after Gravesend United dropped out of the Southern League.

=== First Division (1901–1913) ===

The lineup for Brentford's first Southern League match at Griffin Park, 3 September 1904.

Changes were afoot both on and off the pitch at York Road during the 1901 off-season, with 'The Brentford Football And Sports Club' being registered as a limited liability company and virtually an entirely new team being assembled. Deprived of new captain Robert Stormont for a time due to injury and a suspension for fighting during a match, the Bs finished 1901–02 15th in the 16-team division and were spared relegation after drawing 1–1 with Grays United in a promotion/relegation test match, which Grays forfeited after refusing to play extra time. Throughout the remainder of the 1900s, a lack of financial clout meant that successive managers William Lewis, Dick Molyneux and William Brown were unable to produce better than mid-table finishes in the First Division. Manager Molyneux changed Brentford's colours in 1903 to dark blue and gold stripes, the racing colours of Walter Rothschild, a patron of the club.

Brentford moved to Griffin Park, its first permanent home, in time for the beginning of the 1904–05 season. The Bees reached the FA Cup first round proper for the first time in 1905–06, advancing to the third round before succumbing to Liverpool at Anfield. Despite 18 goals from Geordie Reid, Brentford finished bottom of the First Division in 1908–09, but were spared relegation. Winning the Southern Professional Charity Cup proved to be a scant consolation for secretary-manager Fred Halliday in his first season in charge. In April 1909, hopes about the possibility of the club being elected into the Football League were quashed, when the league's clubs voted down Queens Park Rangers' proposal that the Southern League First Division be merged with the Football League, to create a Third Division. Also in 1909, Brentford's colours were changed to gold shirts with blue sleeves. Manager Fred Halliday lasted in the job until November 1912, when he reverted to his secretarial duties and captain Dusty Rhodes was installed as player-manager. Despite an initial upturn in form, 9 defeats in the final 11 matches of 1912–13 led to Brentford's relegation after an 11-season stay in the First Division.

=== Back in the Second Division (1913–1915) ===
Dusty Rhodes was reappointed as player/manager for the 1913–14 Southern League Second Division season and the majority of the professionals from the previous season were sold or released. Despite a shortage of money due to high expenses (which was offset by the club's lowest-ever professional wage bill of £1,630, equivalent to £162,600 in 2025), Brentford managed a 3rd-place finish. The Bees had their travelling subsidy from the Southern League cut for the 1914–15 season, plus the future looked bleak with the prospect of reduced attendances at Griffin Park, due to many of the clubs in the Second Division being located in the Midlands, the North West and Wales.

On 4 August 1914, Britain's declaration of war on Germany threatened to derail the club's pre-season preparations and as the season got underway, the squad was weakened by the departure of players to fight or work in the munitions industry. By March 1915, only Ted Price, Dusty Rhodes and Alec Barclay remained of the XI which began the season. By utilising amateurs and guests, the Bees managed a mid-table finish. In July 1915, the Southern League cancelled its competition for the duration of the First World War.

== First World War ==
Brentford competed in the London Combination during the First World War under secretary-manager Fred Halliday, finishing in the lower reaches of the division during the 1915–16, 1916–17 and 1917–18 seasons. The squad was decimated by the call-up of players for service or war work, though Ted Price, Dusty Rhodes, Henry White, Alf Amos and Patsy Hendren were able to remain and play in the majority of the club's matches. There was a high turnover of personnel, with 42 players being used during the 1915–16 season and 58 during 1917–18. During this period, the club wore dark blue shirts with gold collars.

With the Hundred Days Offensive underway in France as the 1918–19 season kicked off, the sense of optimism that the First World War would soon end rubbed off on the Bs. 26 goals from Henry White, 25 from guest Jack Cock and 14 from Fred Morley saw Brentford win the London Combination title, four points ahead of nearest challengers Arsenal. After the Armistice, the £2-a-week wages (plus expenses) for the professional players meant that Brentford finished the season with a £2,000 profit, which went towards improving Griffin Park and settling debts. Outside left Patsy Hendren represented England in a Victory International versus Wales in October 1919.

== Entry into the Football League ==

Brentford's first Football League lineup, 28 August 1920.

=== Final Southern League season (1919–1920) ===
Brentford turned down the opportunity to apply for election to the Football League for the 1919–20 season and instead applied for election to the First Division of the Southern League, which was awarded. Playing in its first season at the summit of the Southern League for the first time since 1912–13, secretary-manager Fred Halliday signed almost an entirely new squad, with Patsy Hendren and Ted Price the only survivors from that pre-war season. Henry White left the club in favour of league football with Arsenal and the loss of his goals lead to a 15th-place finish.

=== Early Football League seasons (1920–1926) ===
In May 1920, Brentford and 20 other Southern League First Division clubs were elected into the Football League as founder members of the Third Division for the 1920–21 season. The club's colours were changed to white shirts and black shorts. 11 new players were signed and the Bees' first-ever Football League match took place on 28 August 1920 at Exeter City's St James Park, which resulted in a 3–0 defeat. Despite 18 goals from Harry King, a lack of goals from elsewhere in the side led Brentford to a 21st-place finish, but the club were re-elected into the league without going to a poll.

Archie Mitchell took over as player-manager during the 1921 off-season and buoyed by Harry Morris' 17 goals, Brentford finished 9th in 1921–22, but it proved to be a false dawn, with the triple-departure of Alf Amos, Harry Anstiss and George Pither to Millwall in 1922 and Morris' and captain Bertie Rosier's subsequent departures in February 1923 precipitating two mid-table finishes. A dire opening to the 1924–25 season led Mitchell to step down in December 1924, with Fred Halliday assuming the manager's job for the third and final time and being forced to sue for re-election at the end of the season. Halliday remained in charge for 1925–26, which despite an 18th-place finish and a club-record 94 league goals conceded, promised much for the future with the breakthrough of forwards Ernie Watkins, Jack Lane and Alfred Douglas. In 1925, Brentford's white shirts were changed to the traditional red and white stripes.

== "The Guv'nor" ==
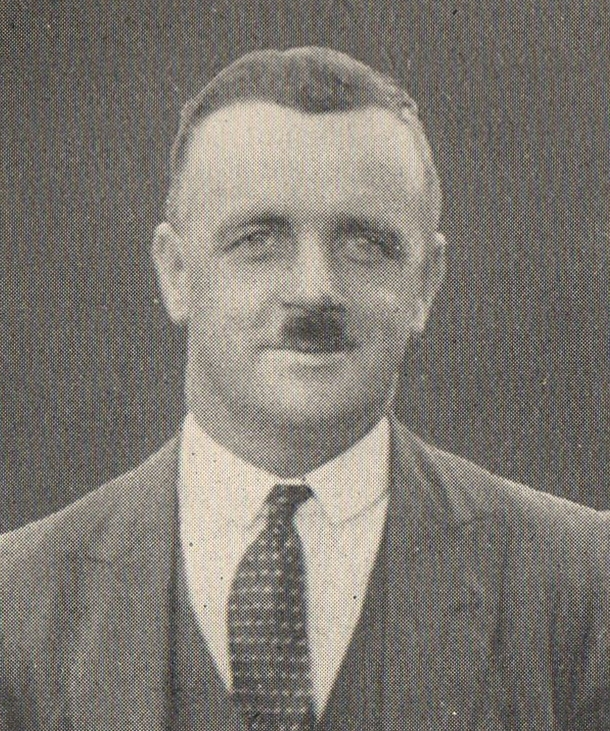
Harry Curtis, known as "The Guv'nor", was Brentford's longest-serving and most successful manager.

=== Building a team (1926–1932) ===
It was all change at Griffin Park during the 1926 off-season, with former Gillingham boss Harry Curtis being installed as manager. Just 9 members of the previous season's squad were retained, but despite mid-table finishes over the following three seasons, Curtis slowly rebuilt the squad with successful full back acquisitions William Hodge, Alexander Stevenson, half backs Jimmy Bain, Reginald Davies and forwards Bill Berry and Jack Phillips. The 1929–30 Third Division South season provided the foundation for the Bees' future success, with the club's unbeaten home record of 21 wins setting a national record which still stands today. Important future signings were made, including outside right Jackie Foster, centre forward Billy Lane, left back Tom Adamson and a masterstroke, local non-League centre half Joe James, who would go on to become one of the club's greatest midfielders. Though Brentford won a club-record 28 league matches, failure to mirror that form away from Griffin Park denied the club promotion to the Second Division after finishing as runners-up to Plymouth Argyle. Third and fifth-place finishes followed in the 1930–31 and 1931–32 seasons respectively, despite the sales of key forwards Jack Lane and Billy Lane, but a sound investment was made in inside forward George Robson, and the acquisition of England amateur international left half Jackie Burns proved to be a coup.

=== Promotion to the Second Division and beyond (1932–1935) ===
Curtis made a string of transfers in 1932 which would put Brentford on a firmly upward trajectory – Jack Holliday, Billy Scott, Ernest Muttitt, new captain Herbert Watson (all from Middlesbrough), Idris Hopkins (Crystal Palace) and an important signing for the future, Albion Rovers' Duncan McKenzie. The Bees romped to the 1932–33 Third Division South title, with Jack Holliday scoring a club-record 39 goals, which included five hat-tricks. The team acquitted themselves well in the Second Division, strengthened with the purchase of forward Charlie Fletcher and later in the season, full back Arthur Bateman. Brentford held the second promotion place throughout February and March 1934, before a late charge by Preston North End saw the Lilywhites pip the Bees to promotion. All but one of the team's 1933–34 goals were scored by the forward line, prompting Curtis to conduct a clearout of his backlines, releasing ageing Tom Adamson, Jimmy Bain, Alexander Stevenson and both first team goalkeepers.

Among Curtis's 1934 off-season signings came goalkeeper James Mathieson and full back George Poyser, plus Jimmy Bain took over as assistant manager. The goals of the 'Big Five' forward line (Scott, Holliday, Muttitt, Fletcher and Hopkins) kept Brentford in the Second Division promotion places throughout the majority of 1934–35 and after topping the table for the third time in the season on 2 March 1935, the Bees would not again relinquish top spot, cruising to the title and promotion to the First Division for the first time in the club's history. Brentford also completed a unique double by winning the London Challenge Cup.

=== First Division heyday (1935–1939) ===

Brentford's highest First Division appearance-makers in each position between 31 August 1935 and 6 May 1939.

After having risen from the third-tier to the first in the space of just three seasons, manager Harry Curtis elected to keep his squad intact for the 1935–36 First Division season. An extension to the New Road terrace increased Griffin Park's capacity to 40,000, which would generate extra income. After 15 matches, Brentford looked certainties to be relegated, but the purchases of half back Dai Richards and forwards David McCulloch and Bobby Reid in mid-season helped complete a remarkable turnaround, with the Bees showing the best form in all four divisions, losing just two of the final 23 matches and finishing in the club's all-time-highest position of 5th.

Brentford again performed above expectations during the 1936–37 and 1937–38 seasons, finishing 6th in each campaign and reaching the FA Cup sixth round for the first time in the latter. The club reached its zenith between October 1937 and February 1938, holding onto top spot in the First Division for 17 consecutive matches. The achievements of the Bees players in the top-flight did not go unnoticed amongst the international selectors, with Duncan McKenzie and Bobby Reid (Scotland) joining previously-capped players David McCulloch (Scotland) and Idris Hopkins and Dai Richards (Wales) in the international ranks. In October 1936, Billy Scott became Brentford's first full England international.

The 1938–39 season was the beginning of the end of Brentford's peak. Time had caught up on stalwarts Scott, Muttitt, Holliday and Bateman and the club's lower status led to the sales of McKenzie, McCulloch, Eastham, Reid and McAloon. Though over £31,000 was banked (equivalent to £1,804,100 in 2025), little over half of it was spent principally on three players – Republic of Ireland international full back Bill Gorman and forwards Les Boulter and Tommy Cheetham. Six wins from 10 games from February through April 1939 pulled Brentford clear of relegation. Late in the season, young homegrown forward Les Smith became the second Brentford player to win a full England cap and Les Boulter scored on his only appearance for Wales.

== Second World War ==
Despite the spectre of war hanging over Griffin Park in August 1939, preparations for the 1939–40 season continued as normal, with Harry Curtis's only significant signing being new captain Tom Manley. The season lasted just three matches before Britain's declaration of war on Germany brought about the suspension of competitive football for the duration of the Second World War.

Brentford competed in the Football League South and the London War League during the war years, with much of the team supplemented by guests and young amateurs, though the core of the pre-war team continued to play in the majority of the club's matches. Guest forwards Douglas Hunt and Eddie Perry led Brentford's forward line throughout much of the war. Brentford's most memorable wartime moment came on 30 May 1942, when two Les Smith goals gave the Bees a 2–0 victory over Portsmouth in the London War Cup final at Wembley Stadium. During 1945–46, the final season of wartime football, Brentford reached the sixth round of the FA Cup for the second time in club history and at the end of the season. Idris Hopkins (Wales), Les Smith (England) and goalkeeper Joe Crozier (Scotland) all won wartime international caps.

== Decline ==
=== Relegation and Harry Curtis's final years (1946–1949) ===
Brentford's 1946–47 squad, for the first competitive season after the Second World War, was propped up by the ageing core of the 1939–40 pre-war squad. Jack Holliday, Joe James (both retired), Les Smith, Tommy Cheetham and George Poyser had by then left the club and free-scoring Bob Thomas could not be convinced to remain. The forward line was further weakened by the departures of Fred Durrant, Gerry McAloon (who had only re-signed for the club in December 1945) and George Wilkins during the season. Three new Scottish mid-season signings strengthened the back lines (Archie Macaulay, George Paterson and Malky MacDonald), but the slump failed to be arrested and the Bees crashed out of the First Division.

After narrowly avoiding a second successive relegation in 1947–48, manager Harry Curtis announced that the 1948–49 season would be his last in the job, possibly due to pressure from the Brentford directors to stand down and his excellent relationship with chairman Louis P. Simon had ended after Simon's death in November 1943. Curtis's long-time trainer Bob Kane also elected to retire and was replaced by Jimmy Hogan. Jackie Gibbons was installed as player-manager in February 1949, which brought an end to Curtis's reign of nearly 23 years. Curtis remained at the club until the end of the 1948–49 season in an advisory capacity to Gibbons. The season ended with a poor 18th-place finish, though notably the FA Cup sixth round fixture at home to Leicester City set a new club-record attendance of 38,678.

=== Financial struggles and another relegation (1949–1954) ===
Despite consecutive 9th-place finishes in the 1949–50 and 1950–51 seasons and one place lower in 1951–52, secretary-manager Jackie Gibbons had worked wonders with little money with which to buy players. Low-cost acquisitions Ken Coote, George Bristow, Ian Dargie, Billy Dare and Ken Horne would each go on to make over 200 appearances for the club. The team's lack of firepower during Gibbons' three full seasons as manager was exemplified by the fact that full back and part-time forward Fred Monk was one of only three players to finish a season with a goal tally in double figures.

Gibbons resigned on the eve of the 1952–53 season and long-serving assistant Jimmy Bain took over as interim manager. Brentford flirted with the relegation places, before Tommy Lawton was appointed player-manager on 2 January 1953. Lawton guided Brentford to a 17th-place finish, but after just one victory from the opening six matches of the 1953–54 season, he tendered his resignation and transferred to Arsenal two weeks later. Player Fred Monk took caretaker charge, before Bill Dodgin Sr. was appointed on 1 October 1953. By then the damage had already been done and despite the signing of future star Johnny Rainford, Brentford's relegation to the Third Division South was confirmed on the final day of the season after a 3–1 defeat to Leicester City at Griffin Park.

== Treading water and promotion challenges ==
=== Back in the Third Division South (1954–1957) ===
Relegation to the Third Division South at the end of the 1953–54 season meant that 1954–55 would be Brentford's first in the bottom-tier for 21 years. The £10,000 sale of Jimmy Bloomfield was used to pay off debts and though manager Bill Dodgin Sr. had no budget with which to work, the youth team's increasing productivity under Alf Bew presented the club with a conveyor belt of homegrown talent. During the season, the graduation of forwards Jim Towers, George Francis, Dennis Heath and goalkeeper Gerry Cakebread, allied with the experience of former youths Wally Bragg and George Bristow, would become crucial to future promotion-pushes. After a mid-table finish in 1954–55, Jim Towers' 22 goals in the 1955–56 season fired Brentford to 6th-place and George Francis established himself as Towers' strike partner in 1956–57, scoring 24 goals to secure another top-half finish. It was announced in March 1957 that manager Dodgin would leave the club at the end of the 1956–57 season.

=== "The Terrible Twins" (1957–1961) ===
Prior to the beginning of the 1957–58 Third Division South season, former Brentford full back Malky MacDonald was appointed as manager. "The Terrible Twins" strike partnership of Jim Towers and George Francis was in imperious form during the first four seasons of MacDonald's reign, accounting for nearly 200 goals. Towers' 37 during 1958–59 made him the Third Division's top-scorer (a total just two goals away from Jack Holliday's club record), plus the 'Twins' accounted for 51 of the Bees' 78 league goals scored during the season. Manager MacDonald was able to field a settled side in the late 1950s and early 1960s, at differing times being able to draw on goalkeeper Gerry Cakebread, full backs Ken Horne, Tom Wilson, half backs George Bristow, Ian Dargie, Ken Coote, Billy Goundry and supporting forwards Johnny Rainford, Dennis Heath, Len Newcombe, George McLeod and Eric Parsons.

After three consecutive top-six finishes, the rot set in during the 1960–61 season, with the poor form on the field mirrored by the news from the boardroom of debts of £50,000 (equivalent to £970,900 in 2025). In a bizarre move, Brentford's first-choice kit had also been changed to amber shirts with a blue 'V' around the neck, which was ultimately a single-season experiment. Strike partners Towers and Francis requested to be placed on the transfer list in February 1961 and John Docherty, who had only played 19 matches for the club, departed for a £17,000 fee in March. Brentford finished the 1960–61 season in 17th-place and stalwarts Bristow, Goundry, Heath, Horne and Parsons were released.

== Cost-cutting and bounceback ==

Brentford's 1962–63 Fourth Division title-winning team.

=== Relegation to the Fourth Division (1961–1963) ===
In an effort to lessen Brentford's debts, Jim Towers and George Francis were sold to rivals Queens Park Rangers for £8,000 and the club slimmed the playing staff down to 16, with 6 players playing on a part-time status. The board's decision proved to be a disaster and despite the signings of former England international Johnny Brooks, outside right Micky Block and the return of George Francis, the Bees finished second-from-bottom of the 1961–62 Third Division and were relegated.

Manager Malky MacDonald was given a sizeable war chest by chairman Jack Dunnett for Brentford's first season in the Fourth Division, bringing in wing half Matt Crowe (£5,000) and inside forward Billy McAdams (£10,000). Three defeats in the first five matches of the season saw the chequebook open again, with £17,000 John Dick arriving at Griffin Park to make up a trio of former internationals in the forward line with Billy McAdams and Johnny Brooks. As the Bees' form picked up, £12,000 centre half Mel Scott and £7,000 outside right John Fielding were also added to the ranks. The club climbed into the promotion places in late October 1962, moved into top two in February 1963 and sat at the summit for the first time since the opening day of the season on 29 March 1963. Despite winning just seven of the final 14 matches of the season, Brentford finished 1962–63 as Fourth Division champions. Dick, McAdams and Brooks scored the majority of the team's goals, netting 69 times between them.

=== Failure to buy promotion from the Third Division (1963–1967) ===
It was a case of "same old, same old" back in the Third Division, the 1963–64 season only notable for it being Ken Coote's last in a Brentford shirt, the full back retiring after a club record 559 appearances. Brentford's chances of promotion back to the Second Division looked good throughout the first half of the 1964–65 season, with the Bees holding top spot through October 1964, but in January 1965, manager Malky MacDonald dropped the bombshell that he would stand down as manager at the end of the campaign. He was immediately placed on gardening leave and trainer Tommy Cavanagh took over the manager's position. Poor away form would ultimately account for Brentford's 5th-place finish.

With it felt around Griffin Park that Brentford's squad could again challenge for promotion from the Third Division, little transfer activity occurred during the 1965–66 pre-season. By November, the Bees were flirting with the relegation places. Jimmy Bloomfield was sold for £6,500, John Docherty returned to the club and Bobby Ross and John Regan were signed in a £10,000 double-deal from Shrewsbury Town. By the final six weeks of the season, mired in relegation, manager Tommy Cavanagh was sacked and replaced by Billy Gray. He failed to produce the miracle required and Brentford were again relegated to the Fourth Division.

== Financial crises ==
=== 19 January 1967 ===
By January 1967, Brentford had spent £114,000 on transfer fees over the previous five seasons (with only £30,000 recouped from fees received), attendances had dropped by 50% since the beginning of the 1965–66 season and the club was losing £400 a week. It was revealed by chairman Dunnett at Brentford's AGM in December 1966 that the club had lost £20,000 during the previous financial year and that he would be selling his stake in the club. Earlier that month, there had been an approach from neighbours Queens Park Rangers, suggesting that the two clubs share Griffin Park. On 19 January 1967, the news broke that Dunnett and his Queens Park Rangers counterpart Jim Gregory had reached an agreement that Brentford's hated rivals would move into Griffin Park, Rangers' ground Loftus Road would be redeveloped as housing and Brentford, as a club, would cease to exist. It immediately became apparent that the remainder of the Brentford board had not been informed of the situation.

After a tense month of fan protests (led by Supporters' Club chairman Peter Pond-Jones), negotiations and donations amounting to £8,500 (equivalent to £135,400 in 2025), a six-man syndicate headed by former Plymouth Argyle chairman Ron Blindell took over Dunnett's shares on 23 February 1967 and guaranteed a 12-month bridging loan of £104,000. The following day, Blindell, as chairman, took control of the club. Manager Billy Gray followed Dunnett out of Griffin Park and trainer Jimmy Sirrel took over as manager. Brentford's form picked up in the wake of the takeover, finishing the 1966–67 season in 9th position, nine points away from the final promotion place. The Bees also won the London Challenge Cup for the second time in three seasons.

=== "Brentford Borough" (1967–1968) ===
The Brentford staff began the 1967–68 season knowing that they were not out of the woods yet, due to the club's £100,000 debt (equivalent to £1,593,400 in 2025) needing to be paid by 30 June 1968. Beginning his first full season as manager, Jimmy Sirrel had just 16 players to pick from and had to supplement the squad with loans, performing a remarkable job, hovering around 6th in the table by November 1967. It was reported at the 1967 AGM that the club was almost trading at break even, but by then Brentford had sunk down the table. £12,000 was spent on forwards Ron Fenton and Allan Mansley in January 1968, but they failed to help arrest the slump.

On 11 March 1968, chairman Ron Blindell announced that plans were afoot to leave Griffin Park and move to Hillingdon's Leas Stadium. It transpired that Queen Park Rangers chairman Jim Gregory had resurrected his interest in Griffin Park and offered £250,000 for the use of the ground, a fee that would wipe out Brentford's £135,000 debt instantly, if the club moved to Hillingdon. The name "Brentford Borough FC" had already been chosen for the new Hillingdon-based club, but once again Brentford was saved at the eleventh hour, with former director Walter Wheatley granting the club a £69,000 interest-free loan, repayable in 12 months. Despite atrocious form in the second half of the 1967–68 season, Brentford had dropped only as far as 14th place.

== Back from the abyss ==

Brentford's 1971–72 Fourth Division promotion-winning team.

=== Recovery and promotion (1969–1972) ===
With Pat Terry replacing the departed Ian Lawther up front, Brentford topped the table on the opening day of the 1968–69 season, before falling back into mid-table. After two seasons of being forced to carry small squads, manager Jimmy Sirrel was able to expand with a number of players signed on free transfers, but the £10,000 sale of John Richardson to help balance the books left Sirrel with just 13 fit players at his disposal by mid-October 1969. Despite having worked wonders to keep Brentford in the Fourth Division promotion hunt, Sirrel departed Brentford for Notts County in November 1969. Player Ron Fenton took caretaker charge, before Frank Blunstone was installed as manager in mid-December. New Zealand international Brian Turner and forward Roger Cross proved to be two of Blunstone's important early signings, but in the end, Brentford missed out on promotion by three points, having lost three of the final seven matches.

Despite the 1970–71 season being chiefly remembered for a run to the fifth round of the FA Cup, it allowed for the establishment of a settled Brentford XI, with Ross, Nelmes, Cross, Gelson, Turner, Renwick and new signing Jackie Graham all making over 40 appearances. The FA Cup run boosted the club's profit on the season to £20,000, which helped pay the final instalment of Ron Blindell's £104,000 loan to the club from February 1967. Aided by the goalscoring of John O'Mara, Brentford raced out of the traps early in the 1971–72 season and sat atop the Fourth Division table for much of the period between August 1971 and January 1972. The early-season form was achieved with just 12 players, despite forward Roger Cross having been sold to neighbours Fulham for £30,000. Some of the money was reinvested in outside right Michael Allen, but manager Blunstone elected to prop up his squad with loans. Aside from a blip while top-scorer O'Mara was suspended, Brentford secured promotion back to the Third Division with two matches of the season remaining.

=== Relegation, consolidation and promotion (1972–1977) ===
Despite Brentford now showing a £20,000 profit in 1971, compared to a £13,000 loss in 1967, manager Fred Blunstone was again forced to operate on a shoestring budget for the 1972–73 season, Brentford's first in the Third Division since 1965–66. After five matches, Brentford were sitting proud in 2nd position, but in mid-September 1972, the previous season's top-scorer John O'Mara was sold to fellow Third Division club Blackburn Rovers for a club record £50,000 fee. Shortly afterwards, influential captain and the previous season's second-leading scorer Bobby Ross also departed. Instead of investing the money in players which could remount the promotion challenge, the board only permitted manager Blunstone to spend £10,000 on forward Stan Webb and £15,000 on the returning Roger Cross. Brentford slipped into the lower reaches of mid-table in December 1972 and then into the relegation zone in March 1973. The Bees were relegated on the final day of the season and Frank Blunstone resigned from the manager's position in July 1973.

Under new manager Mike Everitt and his successor John Docherty, Brentford lived in mid-table obscurity in the Fourth Division during the mid-1970s. A poor start to the 1976–77 season led Docherty to resign and he was replaced by Bill Dodgin Jr. After a period of consolidation, Dodgin's signings Pat Kruse, Paul Shrubb, Barry Lloyd, Len Bond, Willie Graham, Barry Tucker and Doug Allder strengthened a developing team which was spearheaded by forwards Steve Phillips, Andrew McCulloch and Gordon Sweetzer. Though Sweetzer was sold for £30,000 late in the 1977–78 season, Brentford kept their heads and secured promotion back to the Third Division with a 4th-place finish. Phillips' 32 goals made him the top scorer in the Football League and his total of 36 for the season was just three away from Jack Holliday's club record.

=== Stability (1978–1986) ===
Bill Dodgin Jr, Fred Callaghan and Frank McLintock all managed Brentford in the Third Division between 1978 and 1986, with three successive top-9 finishes between 1981 and 1983 under Callaghan being the club's best placings. Some notable players played for the club during much of the period, including Bob Booker, Jim McNichol, Gary Roberts, Francis Joseph and captains Terry Hurlock and Chris Kamara, but none would see success. Brentford reached its first major competitive cup final in the 1984–85 season, facing off against Wigan Athletic in the 1985 Football League Trophy Final at Wembley Stadium. In front of a 34,932 crowd, Brentford lost 3–1, with Robbie Cooke scoring what proved to be a consolation goal.

== Return to the promised land ==
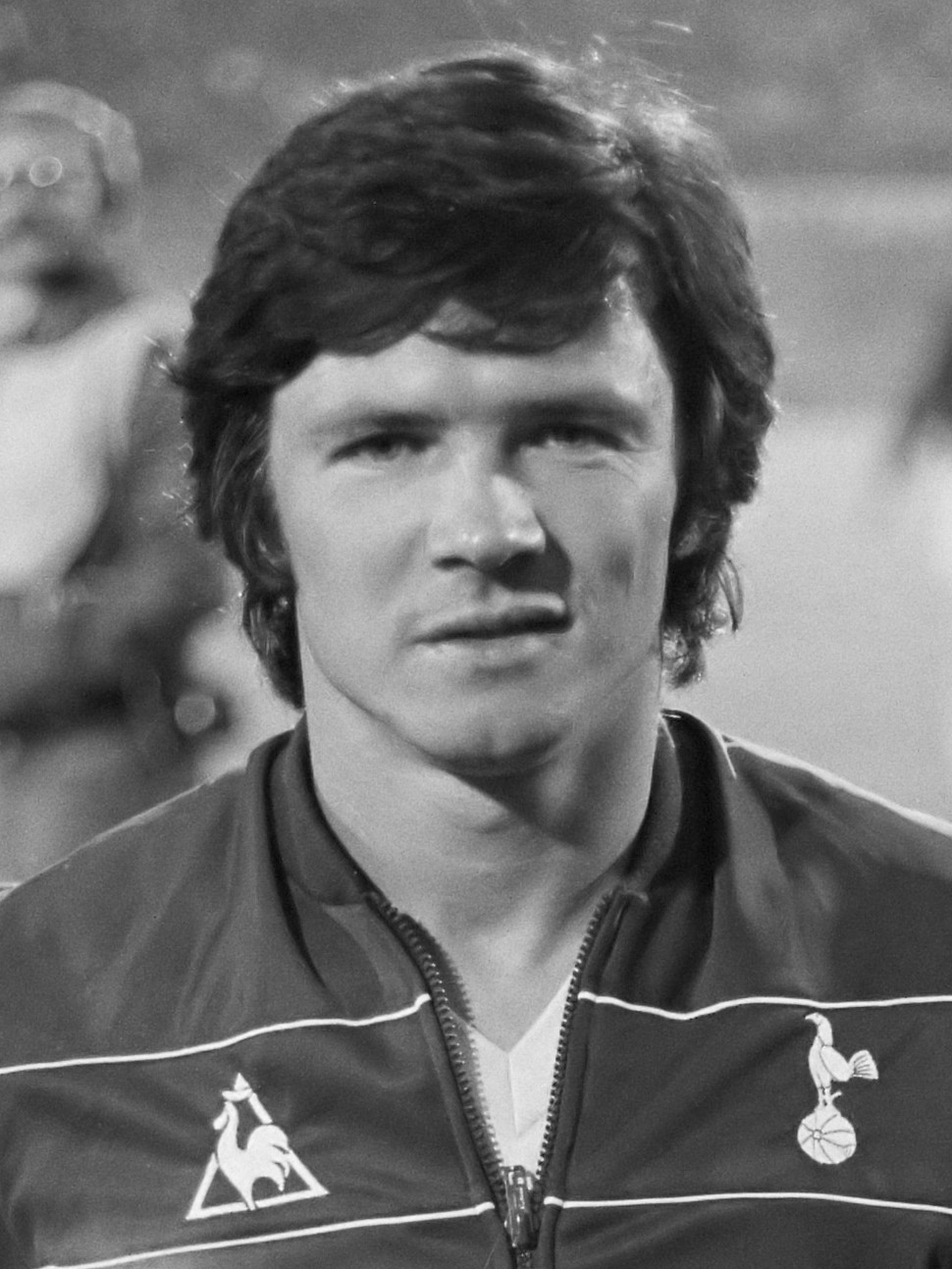
Manager Steve Perryman laid the foundations for Brentford's promotion to the second-tier in 1992.

=== Building a new spine (1986–1990) ===
Beginning his third full season as Brentford manager in 1986–87, Frank McLintock had yet to challenge for promotion from the Third Division, though he had slowly improved the club's league placings. Before the beginning of the season, assistant manager John Docherty moved to Millwall and McLintock replaced him with former England international Steve Perryman. Poor form resulted in the supporters demanding McLintock's departure and he departed the club in mid-January 1987, after the board made public their decision to not renew his contract at the end of the season. Steve Perryman took over as player-manager, bringing in Phil Holder as his assistant. Perryman's Brentford managed to claw their way to a mid-table finish. Brentford flirted with the playoff positions during the 1987–88 season and in 1988–89, a late run almost took the club to them, ultimately falling short. The latter season was memorable more for the Bees' runs to the sixth round of the FA Cup (which ended after a 4–0 defeat to Liverpool at Anfield) and to the semi-finals of the Football League Trophy.

After a forgettable 1989–90, Perryman resigned on the eve of the 1990–91 season due to disputes with the club's chairman. and though he failed to bring success to Griffin Park, his signings of goalkeeper Graham Benstead, midfielders Keith Jones, Simon Ratcliffe and forwards Dean Holdsworth and Gary Blissett, allied with the homegrown defensive trio of Keith Millen, Terry Evans and Jamie Bates, would stand Brentford in good stead in the future.

=== Rise to the second-tier (1990–1993) ===
Phil Holder stepped up from assistant manager to take over the Brentford hot seat just 10 days before the beginning of the 1990–91 season. In his first season, he took the Bees to the area finals of the Football League Trophy and into the 1991 Third Division playoffs, with the season ending after a narrow 3–2 aggregate defeat to the eventual promoted club Tranmere Rovers. It was the first of a number of failed playoff campaigns for the club, with the idea of end-of-season playoffs having ironically been presented to the Football League by then-Brentford chairman Martin Lange in the 1980s.

1991–92 proved to be, up to that point in the club's history, arguably Brentford's best season since the club's golden era under Harry Curtis in the 1930s. 11 wins from the first 16 matches put the Bees top of the Third Division and the club occupied either one of the top two positions until dropping back after four consecutive defeats in March 1992. Six wins from the six final matches saw Brentford recover to win the Third Division championship on the final day and secure second-tier football for the first time since the 1953–54 season. Much of the success was owed to 38-goal striker Dean Holdsworth, joint-top scorer in the Third Division, with Gary Blissett also weighing in with 18 goals.

Phil Holder's preparations for the 1992–93 season in the newly renamed First Division couldn't have been dealt a worse blow when Dean Holdsworth joined Wimbledon for a £720,000 fee in July 1992 and captain Terry Evans suffered a long-term knee injury on the opening day of the season, which required surgery. The season started poorly with the club winning 2 of their opening 12 games. However the club's players turned it around and just two defeats in 11 matches put the Bees up to 10th by the end of 1992, but everything unravelled in the New Year, resulting in relegation back to the third-tier after a 4–1 final-day defeat to Bristol City. Incoming chairman Martin Lange terminated the contracts of Holder and assistant manager Wilf Rostron after the season.

== Near misses and relegation ==
=== Rebuilding and playoff failures (1993–1997) ===
The 1993–94 season proved to be one of rebuilding for Brentford, back in the third-tier under new manager David Webb. Gillingham's Nicky Forster was added to the strike-force in June 1994 and together with strike partner Robert Taylor, the goals of the 'FT Index' fired Brentford to the top of the Second Division midway through the 1994–95 season. Through till late April 1995, Brentford vied with Birmingham City for the one automatic promotion place, before a 2–0 defeat in what proved to be the deciding match at St Andrew's ended the Bees' automatic promotion challenge. Brentford lost on penalties to the eventual promoted club Huddersfield Town in the 1995 Football League playoffs.

A hangover ensued during the 1995–96 season, before everything came good again in 1996–97. Carl Asaba, previously a reserve team player bought from Dulwich Hamlet in August 1994, established himself as one of the top strikers in the Second Division, scoring 24 goals during the season. Brentford occupied top spot for much of the campaign until mid-March 1997, when three consecutive defeats put the Bees back into the second automatic promotion place. The strikeforce had been weakened by the £700,000 sale of Forster in January 1997 and four defeats in the final four games dropped Brentford back to 4th position and into the playoffs. In-form Bristol City were beaten over two legs in the semi-finals, before the season ended when the Bees were "exposed and outclassed" by Crewe Alexandra in the 1997 Second Division playoff Final at Wembley Stadium.

=== Financial crisis, takeover and recovery (1997–2002) ===
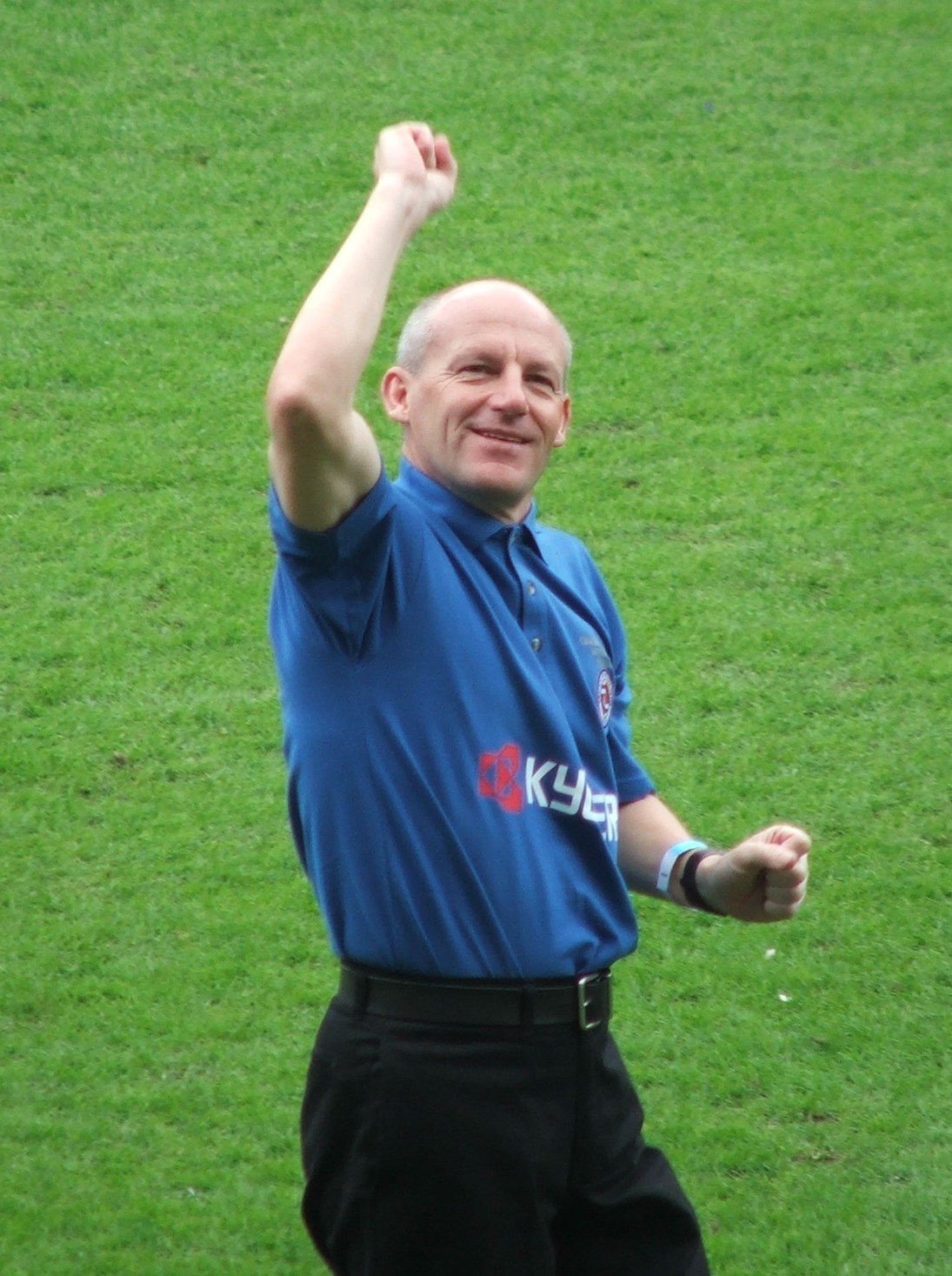
Steve Coppell managed Brentford to the 2002 Second Division playoff Final.

Less than a week before the beginning of the 1997–98 season, a consortium led by manager David Webb bought a majority shareholding in the club, with Webb subsequently stepping down as manager to take up the role of chief executive. All of the club's transfer business was conducted within 9 days of the beginning of the season and the low-cost replacements for the stars of the previous season proved not to be of standard. Webb's replacement Eddie May was sacked in early November and Micky Adams was appointed as manager of a club that had just dropped into the relegation zone. Despite a host of new signings and a mass clearout during the second half of the season, Adams fared worse than his predecessor and Brentford were relegated to the Third Division on the final day of the season.

In June 1998, former Crystal Palace chairman Ron Noades assumed ownership of Brentford and made wholesale changes throughout the club, installing himself as chairman-manager, supported by a three-man coaching team. Excellent home form, big-money signings and a 16-match unbeaten run to close out the season saw the Bees win the 1998–99 Third Division championship on the final day, after beating Cambridge United 1–0 in a "winner takes all" match at the Abbey Stadium. The 1999–00 and 2000–01 seasons proved to be forgettable back in the Second Division, with a need to balance the books leading to a number of player sales and things came to a head when Noades resigned as manager after an FA Cup first round defeat to Kingstonian on 20 November 2000. Brentford reached the 2001 Football League Trophy Final under Ray Lewington, but were defeated 2–1 by Port Vale at the Millennium Stadium.

Steve Coppell was appointed manager in May 2001 and the team raced out of the blocks, establishing itself as promotion contenders after reaching the top of the Second Division in October 2001. Circumstances transpired that to secure automatic promotion, Brentford needed to beat second-place Reading at Griffin Park on the final day, with the Royals needing only a draw. The Bees took the lead through Martin Rowlands, but were pegged back by Jamie Cureton and forced to settle for a place in the 2002 Second Division playoffs. Huddersfield Town were dispatched in the semi-finals, but a resolute Stoke City defence proved too hard to break down in the final, with the Potters running out 2–0 winners.

== Shoestring budgets ==
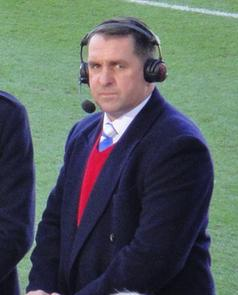
Martin Allen's reign between 2004 and 2006 produced an escape from relegation, two runs to the FA Cup fifth round and two playoff finishes.

=== "The Great Escape" and the "two-bob" team (2002–2006) ===
Just under a month after the 2002 Second Division playoff Final defeat, Steve Coppell quit as Brentford manager. In the wake of the ITV Digital collapse, the financial restraints placed on the club by Noades left Coppell's replacement Wally Downes with an inexperienced squad and administration was narrowly avoided in August 2002. Despite a promising start, the 2002–03 season petered out into mid-table mediocrity and in late March 2003, Noades quit the club and handed control to supporters' trust Bees United. More poor form followed in 2003–04 and a run of seven defeats in 9 matches led to Downes' sacking in March 2004. Former Barnet manager Martin Allen took over and immediately turned things around, finally accomplishing "The Great Escape" from relegation on the final day of the season.

Having built a "two bob" (i.e. "low price") team of journeymen, free transfers, youngsters and loanees, manager Martin Allen produced two roller coaster seasons in the newly renamed League One. In 2004–05, Brentford took Premier League club Southampton to a replay in the FA Cup fifth round and snuck into the 2005 League One playoffs, but were overpowered by Sheffield Wednesday in the semi-finals. 2005–06 saw another run to the FA Cup fifth round, with Premier League strugglers Sunderland being beaten at Griffin Park by two DJ Campbell goals in the fourth round, though the subsequent £500,000 sale of Campbell to Birmingham City robbed the team of potency up front. but too many draws late in the season dropped the club to a 3rd-place finish and a matchup with Swansea City in the 2006 League One playoffs, which resulted in yet another semi-final defeat. The fallout after the playoff exit mirrored that of four years previously, with the manager quitting due to financial constraints and key players being sold, despite changes behind the scenes in January 2006 which had seen Bees United (helped by loans, donations and supporter Matthew Benham) buy former chairman Ron Noades' majority shareholding. Bees United's acquisition of the shares also secured the future of Griffin Park, which had looked under serious threat five years earlier.

=== Relegation and return to League One (2006–2009) ===
Leroy Rosenior was named as Brentford manager in June 2006 and despite a seven-match unbeaten start to the 2006–07 season, the rot set in and Rosenior was sacked and replaced by youth team manager Scott Fitzgerald in November 2006. Fitzgerald fared even worse and left the club after Brentford's relegation was confirmed on 9 April 2007. Head of youth Barry Quin took caretaker charge for the remainder of the season, which culminated in a bottom-place finish in League One, the first time the Bees had finished a season bottom of a division of the Football League. Despite the relegation, the club's finances had been improved after Matthew Benham paid nearly £3 million to take over some of the club's debts in January 2007.

Former England international Terry Butcher was installed as manager on 24 April 2007 and took over first team affairs two weeks later. Despite flirting with the League Two playoffs early in the 2007–08 season, dreadful form, which pointed to relegation into non-League football, led to Butcher's departure by mutual consent in December 2007. Assistant manager Andy Scott took over and turned things round, though hopes of a late charge into the playoffs were extinguished by a run of 10 defeats in the final 15 matches. Scott improved the squad for the 2008–09 season and by December 2008, Brentford were well-established in the automatic promotion places. The Bees sealed the League Two title after victory in the penultimate match of the season versus Darlington.

== Takeover and promotions from League One to the Premier League ==
=== Consolidation in League One and promotion to the Championship (2009–2014) ===
Before the beginning of the 2009–10 League One season, it was announced that supporter Matthew Benham had reached an agreement with supporters' trust Bees United, whereby he would invest significant amounts of capital over a five-year period. Brentford started and ended 2009–10 strongly, finishing in 9th place. 2010–11 became memorable for Brentford's cup exploits, going on a run to the fourth round of the League Cup (beating Premier League Everton on penalties along the way) and reaching the 2011 Football League Trophy Final, which was lost 1–0 to Carlisle United. In March 2011, Benham agreed to invest £1m a year into the club, for a minimum of three seasons. Uwe Rösler was appointed as Brentford manager in June 2011, with Mark Warburton, previously first team coach, taking over the role of sporting director as part of a restructure behind the scenes at the club. 2011–12 proved to be a season of transition and in June 2012, Benham became the majority shareholder of the club, acquiring 96% of the shares.

Brentford came within a penalty kick of automatic promotion to the Championship on the final day of the 2012–13 season, after losing 1–0 to promotion rivals Doncaster Rovers at Griffin Park, who only needed a draw to secure automatic promotion. The scenario mirrored that of the final-day match versus Reading 11 years previously. The Bees recovered to beat Swindon Town on penalties in the 2013 playoff semi-finals after drawing 4–4 on aggregate, but the season came to an end after a 2–1 defeat to Yeovil Town in the final. A hangover ensued early in the 2013–14 season, but after a heated discussion between management and players after a defeat to Stevenage in mid-October 2013, Brentford went on a club-record 19 match unbeaten run in League One, even weathering the storm caused by the departure of Rösler in early December 2013. Mark Warburton carried on Rösler's good work and led Brentford to a runners'-up finish and automatic promotion to the Championship. Earlier in 2014, Benham had acquired 100% ownership of the club – his funding having been vital to Brentford's rise from League Two in 2007 to the Championship in 2014.

=== The Championship and promotion to the Premier League (2014–2021) ===
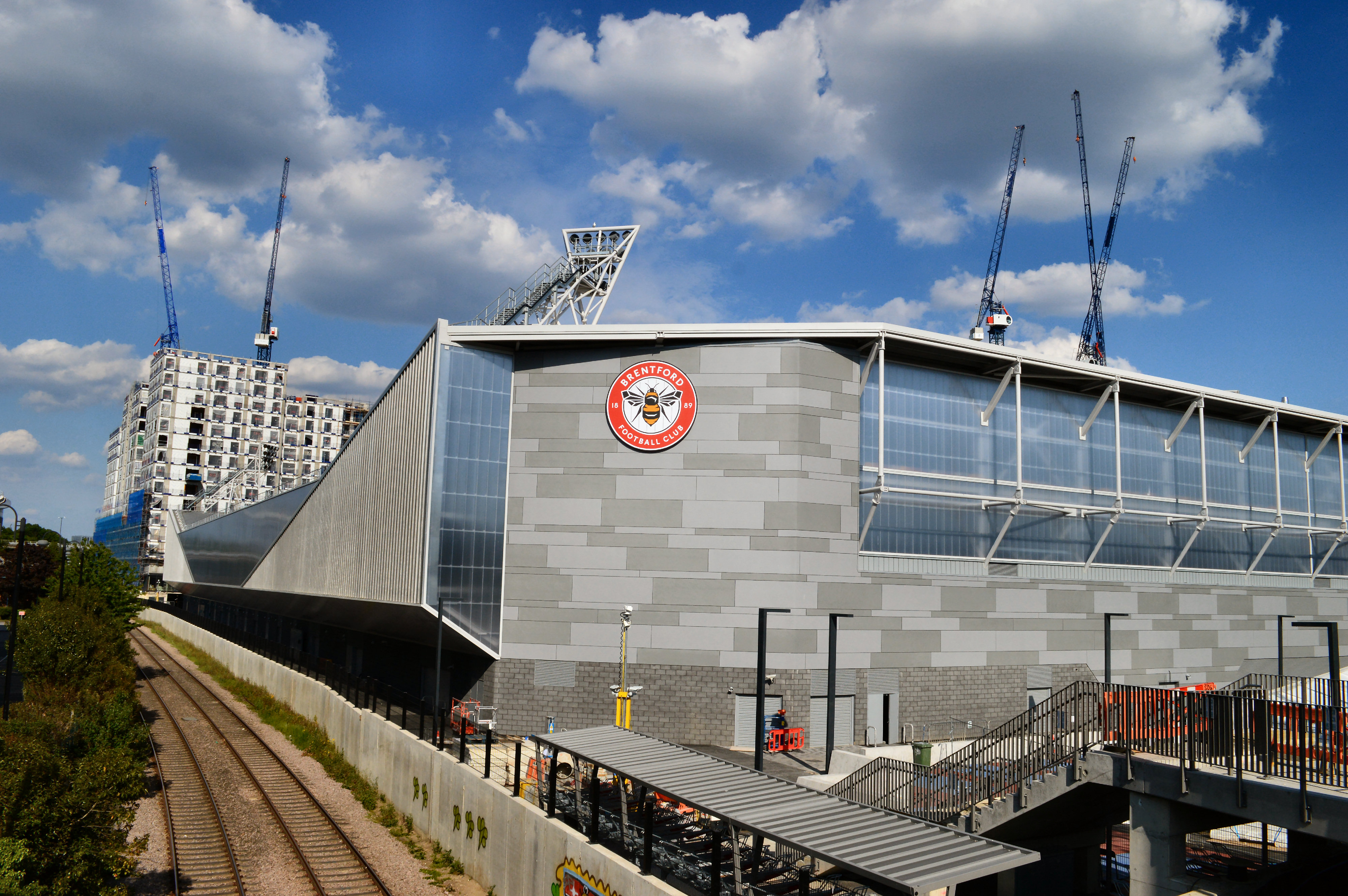
The club moved out of Griffin Park and into the Brentford Community Stadium in August 2020.

Brentford unexpectedly finished 5th in their first season in the second-tier since 1992–93, but were comfortably beaten by Middlesbrough in the 2015 playoff semi-finals. An overhaul of the management and recruitment structure of the club at the end of the season led to the departure of Warburton, who was replaced by Marinus Dijkhuizen. Dijkhuizen lasted just 9 matches before being replaced by interim manager Lee Carsley, who stabilised the team's form before the appointment of Dean Smith in November 2015. Smith solidified Brentford's Championship status with consecutive top-10 finishes in the following three seasons. At the end of the 2015–16 season, the reality that Brentford "can't win by outspending the competition, so we have to out-think them" led to the scrapping of the club's academy and Development Squad and the adoption of a B team as the way to develop its own players. The academy was reopened in July 2022.

After a season of consolidation, Dean Smith's replacement Thomas Frank took Brentford to the 2020 Championship play-off final, which was lost 2–1 to West London rivals Fulham. At the time, 9 out of 9 failed playoff campaigns was a national record. During the 2020 off-season, the club moved out of Griffin Park (its home ground for 116 years) and into the Brentford Community Stadium, a 17,250-capacity all-seater stadium built inside a wye 0.6 miles to the east. Brentford repeated their third-place finish during the 2020–21 regular season and went one better in the playoffs, securing promotion to the Premier League with a 2–0 victory over Swansea City in the 2021 Championship play-off final.

== Premier League ==
2021–22 was Brentford's first season of top-flight football since 1946–47. Under head coach Thomas Frank, the club achieved mid-table finishes in the club's first four Premier League seasons. The club went into the final day of the 2022–23 and 2024–25 seasons still in contention for a European place. Head coach Frank departed the club in June 2025 and was replaced by Keith Andrews.
