= 1972–73 Brentford F.C. season =

English football team season

Brentford
1972–73 season
- Chairman: Les Davey & Walter Wheatley
- Manager: Frank Blunstone
- Stadium: Griffin Park
- Third Division: 22nd (relegated)
- FA Cup: First round
- League Cup: Second round
- Top goalscorer: League: Docherty, Murray (7); All: Docherty (8)
- Highest home attendance: 11,803
- Lowest home attendance: 6,067
- Average home league attendance: 8,742
Home colours

During the 1972–73 English football season, Brentford competed in the Football League Third Division. The early-season departures of goalscorers John O'Mara and Bobby Ross and 15 consecutive away league defeats led to Brentford's relegation straight back to the Fourth Division.

== Season summary ==
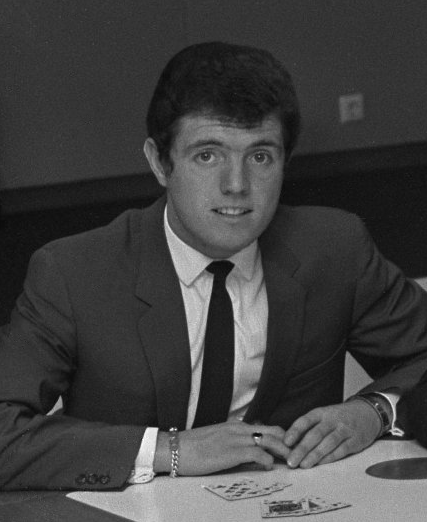
The signing of former Arsenal and Tottenham Hotspur winger David Jenkins promised much, but he left the club on loan in March 1973.

Brentford's promotion to the Third Division at the end of the 1971–72 season meant that the club would compete in the third-tier for the first time since 1965–66. Self-imposed financial austerity since the club's relegation to the Fourth Division had enabled the club's large debts to be paid off, but despite promotion and increasing attendances, manager Frank Blunstone would again be forced to maintain a small playing squad. Blunstone turned down the chance to become assistant manager at Everton during the off-season. Released in the wake of the promotion were defender Steven Tom, midfielder Brian Turner and winger Gordon Neilson and in came amateur goalkeeper Paul Priddy, midfielders David Court and Alan Murray, winger David Jenkins and Stewart Houston's loan was turned into a permanent transfer for a £15,000 fee. The Brentford youth team was also reactivated after being disbanded due to the budget cuts of 1967, with Kevin Harding, Richard Poole and Graham Pearce being taken on as apprentices. Gary Huxley would win an England Youth cap during the season.

Despite losing and drawing the first two league matches of the season, three consecutive wins put Brentford in 2nd position by 2 September 1972. 10 days later, forward John O'Mara, the previous season's Gallagher's Divisional Footballer Of The Year, was sold to Third Division rivals Blackburn Rovers for a club-record £50,000 fee. Given that Chelsea had recently paid Southend United £100,000 for 25-goal forward Bill Garner, it was felt amongst the Brentford supporters that O'Mara had been sold cheaply. The loss of O'Mara's goals and the departure of captain Bobby Ross shortly afterwards contributed a great deal to Brentford's relegation at the end of the season, given that the two players had scored over half of Brentford's goals during the previous campaign.

By early October 1972, Brentford were in the bottom-six of the Third Division, but a profit of nearly £80,000 from the first eight league matches of the season and the £50,000 from the sale of John O'Mara allowed manager Frank Blunstone to pay £10,000 for Carlisle United forward Stan Webb. By mid-December, Blunstone had just 12 fit players available and despite spending over a further £25,000 on attackers Roger Cross, Barry Salvage and Andy Woon, Brentford's slide towards relegation continued through the early months of 1973. The mid-season signings failed to help arrest the slump and Brentford were relegated after taking just two points from the final six matches of the season. Aside from the lack of goals (winger John Docherty top-scored with 8), Brentford lost 15 consecutive away league matches during the season, a new club record.

== League table ==
Pos	Team	Pld	W	D	L	GF	GA	GAv	Pts	Promotion or relegation
20	Halifax Town	46	13	15	18	43	53	0.811	41	
21	Rotherham United (R)	46	17	7	22	51	65	0.785	41	Relegation to the Fourth Division
22	Brentford (R)	46	15	7	24	51	69	0.739	37	Relegation to the Fourth Division
23	Swansea City (R)	46	14	9	23	51	73	0.699	37	Relegation to the Fourth Division
24	Scunthorpe United (R)	46	10	10	26	33	72	0.458	30	Relegation to the Fourth Division

Source: rsssf.com
(R) Relegated

== Results ==
Brentford's goal tally listed first.

=== Legend ===
Win	Draw	Loss

=== Pre-season and friendlies ===
Date	Opponent	Venue	Result	Attendance	Scorer(s)
29 July 1972	Portsmouth	H	0–1	n/a	
1 August 1972	Hillingdon Borough	A	2–1	n/a	Allen, Murray (pen)
5 August 1972	Aldershot	A	1–1	2,730	Allen
8 August 1972	Ashford	A	1–4	n/a	Murray (pen)
18 October 1972	Hampton	A	2–3	n/a	Murray, Proctor
9 December 1972	Exeter City	A	0–1	n/a	
4 May 1973	Everton	H	3–0	3,035	Salvage, Woon, Bence

=== Football League Third Division ===
No.	Date	Opponent	Venue	Result	Attendance	Scorer(s)
1	12 August 1972	Halifax Town	H	0–1	10,164	
2	19 August 1972	Oldham Athletic	A	1–1	6,106	Houston
3	26 August 1972	Blackburn Rovers	H	4–0	9,427	Arentoft (og), Houston, O'Mara, Graham
4	28 August 1972	Bolton Wanderers	H	2–1	11,803	Allen, Murray
5	2 September 1972	Plymouth Argyle	A	1–0	7,833	Murray
6	9 September 1972	Swansea City	H	0–2	9,986	
7	16 September 1972	Port Vale	A	0–1	4,663	
8	20 September 1972	Chesterfield	A	0–3	6,507	
9	23 September 1972	Bournemouth	H	1–1	11,100	Docherty
10	25 September 1972	Bristol Rovers	H	2–1	9,720	Docherty, Jenkins
11	30 September 1972	Notts County	A	0–1	8,152	
12	7 October 1972	Scunthorpe United	A	0–1	3,378	
13	9 October 1972	Tranmere Rovers	H	2–0	8,154	Docherty, D'Arcy (og)
14	14 October 1972	Walsall	H	2–0	9,493	Houston, Docherty
15	21 October 1972	Southend United	A	0–4	7,205	
16	28 October 1972	Rochdale	H	1–0	9,201	Docherty
17	4 November 1972	Bristol Rovers	A	1–3	7,916	Houston
18	11 November 1972	Chesterfield	H	3–1	8,078	Murray (pen), Webb, Houston
19	25 November 1972	York City	H	2–0	7,111	Webb, Graham
20	28 November 1972	Charlton Athletic	A	1–2	6,192	Docherty
21	2 December 1972	Shrewsbury Town	A	0–2	2,079	
22	16 December 1972	Grimsby Town	A	0–4	9,110	
23	23 December 1972	Wrexham	H	1–0	6,067	Docherty
24	26 December 1972	Bournemouth	A	2–3	14,372	Houston, Graham
25	30 December 1972	Oldham Athletic	H	1–1	7,719	Webb
26	6 January 1973	Blackburn Rovers	A	1–2	6,534	Graham
27	13 January 1973	Rotherham United	H	1–1	7,446	Cross
28	20 January 1973	Plymouth Argyle	H	0–2	7,075	
39	26 January 1973	Swansea City	A	1–2	2,119	Murray
30	2 February 1973	Tranmere Rovers	A	2–6	6,650	Court, Murray
31	10 February 1973	Port Vale	H	5–0	6,694	Woon (3), Graham, Salvage
32	24 February 1973	Grimsby Town	H	0–1	9,302	
33	26 February 1973	Charlton Athletic	H	1–0	9,929	Salvage
34	3 March 1973	Scunthorpe United	H	1–0	7,896	Murray
35	6 March 1973	Rotherham United	A	1–2	3,758	Webb
36	10 March 1973	Walsall	A	0–3	4,192	
37	17 March 1973	Southend United	H	1–2	8,051	Cross
38	19 March 1973	Watford	H	1–1	8,232	Cross
39	24 March 1973	Rochdale	A	1–0	1,747	Allen
40	31 March 1973	York City	A	1–0	2,307	Allen
41	4 April 1973	Halifax Town	A	2–3	970	Webb, Allen
42	7 April 1973	Shrewsbury Town	H	1–2	6,758	Salvage
43	14 April 1973	Watford	A	2–2	7,813	Cross, Murray
44	20 April 1973	Notts County	H	1–1	11,658	Graham
45	23 April 1973	Wrexham	A	1–4	2,611	Webb
46	28 April 1973	Bolton Wanderers	A	0–2	21,917	

=== FA Cup ===
Round	Date	Opponent	Venue	Result	Attendance	Scorer
1R	18 November 1972	Yeovil Town	A	1–2	9,447	Allen

=== Football League Cup ===
Round	Date	Opponent	Venue	Result	Attendance	Scorer
1R	16 August 1972	Cambridge United	H	1–0	7,750	Docherty
2R	5 September 1972	Rotherham United	A	0–2	4,996	

- Sources: 100 Years of Brentford, The Big Brentford Book of the Seventies, Statto

== Playing squad ==
Players' ages are as of the opening day of the 1972–73 season.

Pos.	Name	Nat.	Date of birth (age)	Signed from	Signed in	Notes
Goalkeepers
GK	Gordon Phillips	(England)	17 November 1946 (aged 25)	Hayes	1963	
GK	Paul Priddy	(England)	11 July 1953 (aged 19)	Maidenhead United	1972	
Defenders
DF	Peter Gelson	(England)	18 October 1941 (aged 30)	Youth	1961	
DF	Alan Hawley (c)	(England)	7 June 1946 (aged 26)	Youth	1962	
DF	Alan Nelmes	(England)	20 October 1948 (aged 23)	Chelsea	1967	
DF	Terry Scales	(England)	18 January 1951 (aged 21)	West Ham United	1971	
Midfielders
MF	Michael Allen	(England)	30 March 1949 (aged 23)	Middlesbrough	1971	
MF	Paul Bence	(England)	21 December 1948 (aged 23)	Reading	1970	
MF	David Court	(England)	1 March 1944 (aged 28)	Luton Town	1972	
MF	John Docherty	(Scotland)	29 April 1940 (aged 32)	Reading	1970	
MF	Jackie Graham	(Scotland)	16 July 1946 (aged 26)	Guildford City	1970	
MF	David Jenkins	(England)	2 September 1946 (aged 25)	Tottenham Hotspur	1972	Loaned to Hereford United
MF	Alan Murray	(England)	5 November 1949 (aged 22)	York City	1972	
MF	Barry Salvage	(England)	21 December 1946 (aged 25)	Queens Park Rangers	1973	
Forwards
FW	Roger Cross	(England)	20 October 1948 (aged 23)	Fulham	1973	
FW	Stewart Houston	(Scotland)	20 August 1949 (aged 22)	Chelsea	1972	
FW	Stan Webb	(England)	6 December 1947 (aged 24)	Carlisle United	1972	
FW	Andy Woon	(England)	26 June 1952 (aged 20)	Bognor Regis Town	1973	
Players who left the club mid-season
GK	Kieron Baker	(England)	29 October 1949 (aged 22)	Bournemouth	1972	Returned to Bournemouth after loan
FW	John O'Mara	(England)	19 March 1947 (aged 25)	Wimbledon	1971	Transferred to Blackburn Rovers
FW	Bobby Ross	(Scotland)	10 May 1942 (aged 30)	Shrewsbury Town	1966	Released

- Sources: The Big Brentford Book of the Seventies, Timeless Bees

== Coaching staff ==
Name	Role
(England) Frank Blunstone	Manager
(England) Eddie Lyons	Trainer

== Statistics ==
=== Appearances and goals ===
Substitute appearances in brackets.

Pos	Nat	Name	League		FA Cup		League Cup		Total	
Pos	Nat	Name	Apps	Goals	Apps	Goals	Apps	Goals	Apps	Goals
GK	(England)	Gordon Phillips	15	0	1	0	0	0	16	0
GK	(England)	Paul Priddy	25	0	0	0	2	0	27	0
DF	(England)	Peter Gelson	41 (1)	0	1	0	2	0	44 (1)	0
DF	(England)	Alan Hawley	43	0	0	0	2	0	45	0
DF	(England)	Alan Nelmes	35 (1)	0	1	0	2	0	38 (1)	0
DF	(England)	Terry Scales	41	0	1	0	2	0	44	0
MF	(England)	Michael Allen	26	4	1	1	1	0	28	5
MF	(England)	Paul Bence	33 (3)	0	0	0	1	0	34 (3)	0
MF	(England)	David Court	8 (4)	1	0	0	1	0	9 (4)	1
MF	(Scotland)	John Docherty	34 (2)	7	1	0	1	1	36 (2)	8
MF	(Scotland)	Jackie Graham	30 (1)	6	1	0	2	0	33 (1)	6
MF	(England)	David Jenkins	13 (5)	1	0	0	1	0	14 (5)	1
MF	(England)	Alan Murray	42 (3)	7	1	0	2	0	45 (3)	7
MF	(England)	Barry Salvage	16	3	—		—		16	3
FW	(England)	Roger Cross	19	4	—		—		19	4
FW	(Scotland)	Stewart Houston	39	6	1	0	2	0	42	6
FW	(England)	John O'Mara	4	1	—		1	0	5	1
FW	(Scotland)	Bobby Ross	7	0	—		1 (1)	0	8 (1)	0
FW	(England)	Stan Webb	24	6	1	0	—		25	6
FW	(England)	Andy Woon	5 (1)	3	—		—		5 (1)	3
Players loaned in during the season
GK	(England)	Kieron Baker	6	0	—		—		6	0

- Players listed in italics left the club mid-season.
- Source: 100 Years of Brentford

=== Goalscorers ===
Pos.	Nat	Player	FL3	FAC	FLC	Total
MF	(Scotland)	John Docherty	7	0	1	8
MF	(England)	Alan Murray	7	0	0	7
MF	(Scotland)	Jackie Graham	6	0	0	6
FW	(Scotland)	Stewart Houston	6	0	0	6
FW	(England)	Stan Webb	6	0	0	6
MF	(England)	Michael Allen	5	1	0	6
FW	(England)	Roger Cross	4	—	—	4
MF	(England)	Barry Salvage	3	—	—	3
FW	(England)	Andy Woon	3	—	—	3
FW	(England)	John O'Mara	1	—	0	1
MF	(England)	David Court	1	0	0	1
MF	(England)	David Jenkins	1	0	0	1
Opponents			2	0	0	2
Total			51	1	1	53

- Players listed in italics left the club mid-season.
- Source: 100 Years of Brentford

=== Management ===
Name	Nat	From	To	Record All Comps					Record League				
Name	Nat	From	To	P	W	D	L	W %	P	W	D	L	W %
Frank Blunstone	(England)	12 August 1972	28 April 1973	49	16	7	26	32.65	46	15	7	24	32.61

=== Summary ===
Games played	49 (46 Fourth Division, 1 FA Cup, 2 League Cup)
Games won	16 (15 Fourth Division, 0 FA Cup, 1 League Cup)
Games drawn	7 (7 Fourth Division, 0 FA Cup, 0 League Cup)
Games lost	26 (24 Fourth Division, 1 FA Cup, 1 League Cup)
Goals scored	53 (51 Fourth Division, 1 FA Cup, 1 League Cup)
Goals conceded	73 (69 Fourth Division, 2 FA Cup, 2 League Cup)
Clean sheets	13 (12 Fourth Division, 0 FA Cup, 1 League Cup)
Biggest league win	5–0 versus Port Vale, 10 February 1973
Worst league defeat	4–0 on two occasions; 6–2 versus Tranmere Rovers, 2 February 1973
Most appearances	48, Alan Murray (45 Fourth Division, 1 FA Cup, 2 League Cup)
Top scorer (league)	7, John Docherty, Alan Murray
Top scorer (all competitions)	8, John Docherty

== Transfers & loans ==
Players transferred in
Date	Pos.	Name	Previous club	Fee	Ref.
June 1972	MF	(England) Alan Murray	(England) Middlesbrough	Free	
July 1972	MF	(England) David Jenkins	(England) Tottenham Hotspur	Free	
August 1972	MF	(England) David Court	(England) Luton Town	Free	
October 1972	MF	(England) Billy Stagg	n/a	n/a	
October 1972	FW	(England) Stan Webb	(England) Carlisle United	£10,000	
1972	FW	(Scotland) Stewart Houston	(England) Chelsea	£15,000	
1972	FW	(England) Roy Cotton	(England) Tottenham Hotspur	n/a	
January 1973	FW	(England) Roger Cross	(England) Fulham	£16,000	
February 1973	MF	(England) Barry Salvage	(England) Queens Park Rangers	£9,000	
February 1973	FW	(England) Andy Woon	(England) Bognor Regis Town	£1,000	
Players loaned in
Date from	Pos.	Name	From	Date to	Ref.
February 1973	GK	(England) Kieron Baker	(England) Bournemouth	March 1973	
Players transferred out
Date	Pos.	Name	Subsequent club	Fee	Ref.
12 September 1972	FW	(England) John O'Mara	(England) Blackburn Rovers	£50,000	
Players loaned out
Date from	Pos.	Name	To	Date to	Ref.
March 1973	MF	(England) David Jenkins	(England) Hereford United	End of season	
Players released
Date	Pos.	Name	Subsequent club	Join date	Ref.
October 1972	FW	(Scotland) Bobby Ross	(England) Cambridge United	October 1972	
May 1973	MF	(England) David Court	(England) Barnet	1973	
May 1973	MF	(England) Alan Murray	(England) Doncaster Rovers	July 1973	
May 1973	GK	(England) Gordon Phillips	(England) Hillingdon Borough	1973	

== Awards ==
- Supporters' Player of the Year: Peter Gelson
- Players' Player of the Year: Paul Bence
