= Brentford F.C. Player of the Year =

Award given by Brentford Supporters Club

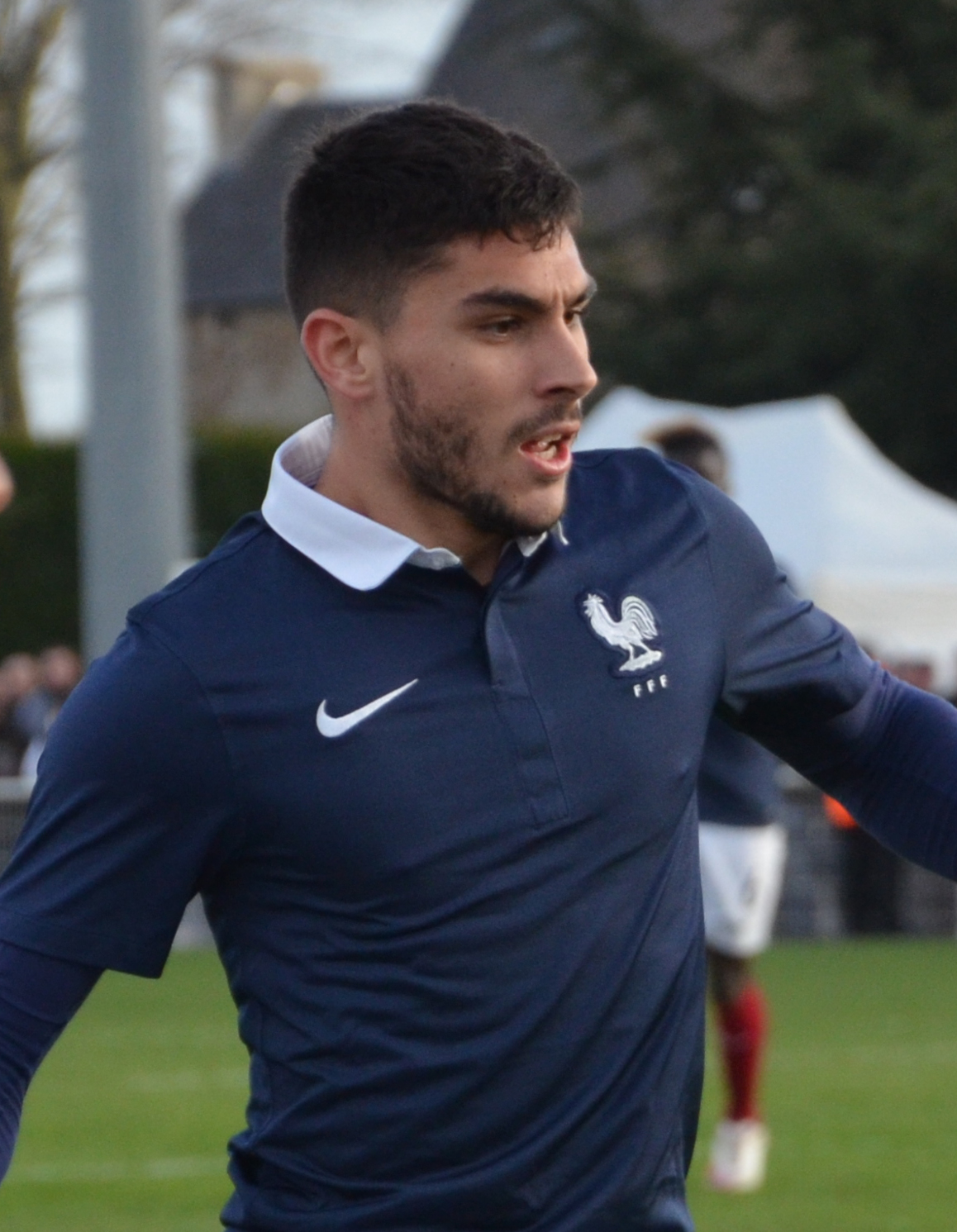
Neal Maupay was named the Brentford Supporters' and Players' Player of the Year after scoring 28 goals during the 2018–19 season.

Brentford Football Club is an English professional football club based in Brentford, Hounslow, London. Between 1897 and 1920, the first team competed in the London League, Southern League and Western League. Since 1920, the first team has competed in the Football League, the Premier League and other nationally and internationally organised competitions. All players who have been awarded the club's Supporters' Player of the Year and Players' Player of the Year awards are listed below.

== Background ==
The Brentford Supporters' Player of the Year award is chosen by members of the Brentford Supporters Club and was first presented to full back Ken Coote at the end of the 1961–62 season. The award has been presented annually since, with the exception of the 1967–68 and 1968–69 seasons. The presentation is traditionally made in May each year at the Big Red Ball awards dinner, with the winner receiving the Cyril Tyler Cup. Bob Booker was the first winner of the current cup, in 1983.

The Brentford Players' Player of the Year award is chosen by the members of that season's first team squad and was first presented to goalkeeper Chic Brodie at the end of the 1969–70 season. The award has not been presented with such regularity as the Supporters' Player of the Year award and midfielder Jackie Graham has received the trophy more than any other player, on three occasions.

Players who won both awards in a single season are Michael Allen, Bob Booker, Mikkel Damsgaard, Peter Gelson, Terry Hurlock, Alan Judge, Chris Kamara, Pat Kruse, Neal Maupay, Andrew McCulloch, Keith Millen, Christian Nørgaard, Gary Phillips, Danis Salman and Igor Thiago. Terry Evans is the only player to win both awards twice.

== Key ==
=== Playing positions ===
GK	Goalkeeper	RB	Right back	RW	Right winger	DF	Defender	HB	Half back	IF	Inside forward	DM	Defensive midfielder
OL	Outside left	LB	Left back	LW	Left winger	CB	Centre back	FW	Forward	FB	Full back	RM	Right midfielder
W	Winger	MF	Midfielder	ST	Striker	WH	Wing half	AM	Attacking midfielder	CM	Central midfielder	LM	Left midfielder
U	Utility player	OR	Outside right	SW	Sweeper	LH	Left half	RH	Right half				

Symbol	Meaning
‡	Brentford player in the 2026–27 season.
*	Player has left Brentford but is still playing in a professional league.
♦	Player went on to manage the club.

== Player of the Year winners ==
Season	Player	Nationality	Position	Name	Nationality	Position	Other awards	Ref.
Season	Supporters' Player of the Year			Players' Player of the Year			Other awards	Ref.
1961–62	Ken Coote	England	FB	Not awarded			―	
1962–63	Micky Block	England	OR	Not awarded			―	
1963–64	Mel Scott	England	WH	Not awarded			―	
1964–65	Chic Brodie	Scotland	GK	Not awarded			―	
1965–66	Chic Brodie	Scotland	GK	Not awarded			―	
1966–67	John Docherty ♦	Scotland	OF	Not awarded			―	
1969–70	Bobby Ross	Scotland	FW	Chic Brodie	Scotland	GK	―	
1970–71	Bobby Ross	Scotland	FW	Alan Nelmes	England	CB	―	
1971–72	John O'Mara	England	FW	Jackie Graham	Scotland	MF	O'Mara was named as Gallaghers Divisional Footballer of the Year.	
1972–73	Peter Gelson	England	CB	Paul Bence	England	MF	―	
1973–74	Peter Gelson	England	CB	Peter Gelson	England	CB	―	
1974–75	Steve Sherwood	England	GK	Jackie Graham	Scotland	MF	―	
1975–76	Michael Allen	England	FB	Michael Allen	England	FB	―	
1976–77	Gordon Sweetzer	Canada	FW	Jackie Graham	Scotland	MF	―	
1977–78	Andrew McCulloch	England	FW	Andrew McCulloch	England	FW	―	
1978–79	Jim McNichol	Scotland	CB	Len Bond	England	GK	―	
1979–80	Pat Kruse	England	CB	Pat Kruse	England	CB	―	
1980–81	Terry Hurlock	England	MF	Terry Hurlock	England	MF	―	
1981–82	Stan Bowles	England	MF	Alan Whitehead	England	CB	―	
1982–83	Bob Booker	England	MF	Bob Booker	England	MF	―	
1983–84	Chris Kamara	England	MF	Chris Kamara	England	MF	―	
1984–85	Danis Salman	England	FB	Danis Salman	England	FB	―	
1985–86	Gary Phillips	England	GK	Gary Phillips	England	GK	―	
1986–87	Andy Sinton	England	MF	Gary Phillips	England	GK	―	
1987–88	Andy Sinton	England	MF	Roger Joseph	England	RB	Joseph was named in the Third Division PFA Team of the Year.	
1988–89	Terry Evans	England	CB	Terry Evans	England	CB	―	
1989–90	Terry Evans	England	CB	Terry Evans	England	CB	―	
1990–91	Graham Benstead	England	GK	Graham Benstead	England	GK	―	
1991–92	Keith Millen	England	CB	Keith Millen	England	CB	―	
1992–93	Billy Manuel	England	LB/MF	Not awarded			―	
1993–94	Kevin Dearden	England	GK	Not awarded			―	
1994–95	Jamie Bates	England	CB	Not awarded			―	
1995–96	Robert Taylor	England	FW	Not awarded			―	
1996–97	Barry Ashby	England	CB	Not awarded			―	
1997–98	Carl Hutchings	England	MF	Not awarded			―	
1998–99	Darren Powell	England	CB	Not awarded			―	
1999–2000	Martin Rowlands	Republic of Ireland	MF	Not awarded			―	
2000–01	Gavin Mahon	England	MF/CB	Not awarded			―	
2001–02	Ívar Ingimarsson	Iceland	CB	Not awarded			―	
2002–03	Paul Smith	England	GK	Not awarded			―	
2003–04	Jay Tabb	Republic of Ireland	AM/LW	Not awarded			―	
2004–05	Sam Sodje	Nigeria	CB	Michael Turner	England	CB	―	
2005–06	Michael Turner	England	CB	Not awarded			―	
2006–07	Jo Kuffour	England	FW	Not awarded			―	
2007–08	Matthew Heywood	England	CB	Not awarded			―	
2008–09	Sam Wood	England	LW/LB	Not awarded			―	
2009–10	Leon Legge	England	CB	Not awarded			―	
2010–11	Richard Lee	England	GK	Not awarded			―	
2011–12	Jonathan Douglas	Republic of Ireland	DM	Not awarded			―	
2012–13	Clayton Donaldson	Jamaica	FW	Harlee Dean	England	CB	―	
2012–13	Clayton Donaldson	Jamaica	FW	Simon Moore *	England	GK	―	
2013–14	Alan McCormack	Republic of Ireland	RB/DM	Tony Craig	England	CB/LB	McCormack was also named in the League One Team of the Year.	
2014–15	Toumani Diagouraga	France	DM	Alex Pritchard	England	AM	―	
2015–16	Alan Judge	Republic of Ireland	AM	Alan Judge	Republic of Ireland	AM	Judge was also named in the Championship PFA Team of the Year and the Football League Team of the Year.	
2016–17	Harlee Dean *	England	CB	Ryan Woods *	England	CM	―	
2017–18	Ryan Woods *	England	CM	Romaine Sawyers	Saint Kitts and Nevis	AM	―	
2018–19	Neal Maupay *	France	FW	Neal Maupay *	France	FW	―	
2019–20	Saïd Benrahma *	Algeria	W	Ollie Watkins *	England	FW/W	Benrahma was named in the Championship PFA Team of the Year. Watkins was named as the Championship Player of the Year and in the Championship PFA Team of the Year.	
2020–21	Ivan Toney *	England	FW	Not awarded			Toney was named in the Championship Team of the Year and in the Championship PFA Team of the Year.	
2021–22	Christian Nørgaard *	Denmark	DM	Christian Nørgaard *	Denmark	DM	―	
2022–23	Ben Mee	England	CB	Ivan Toney *	England	FW	―	
2023–24	Ethan Pinnock *	Jamaica	CB	Vitaly Janelt ‡	Germany	MF	―	
2024–25	Mikkel Damsgaard ‡	Denmark	AM	Mikkel Damsgaard ‡	Denmark	AM	―	
2025–26	Igor Thiago ‡	Brazil	FW	Igor Thiago ‡	Brazil	FW	―	
