= Terry Scales (footballer) =

English footballer

Personal information
- Full name: Terrence Albert Scales
- Date of birth: 18 January 1951 (age 75)
- Place of birth: Stratford, England
- Positions: Defender; midfielder

Youth career
- West Ham United

Senior career*
Years	Team	Apps	(Gls)
1971–1977	Brentford	212	(6)
- Dagenham
- Heybridge Swifts
- * Club domestic league appearances and goals

Terrence Albert Scales (born 18 January 1951) is an English retired professional footballer who made over 210 appearances as a defender in the Football League for Brentford.

== Playing career ==
=== West Ham United ===
Scales began his career at the age of 12 in the youth system at First Division club West Ham United, who he supported as a boy. He failed to make a first team appearance for the Hammers and departed Upton Park at the end of the 1970–71 season.

=== Brentford ===
During the 1971 off-season, Scales dropped through the leagues join Fourth Division club Brentford on a two-year contract, with a two-year option. He had caught the eye of the Bees' staff while playing for West Ham United in Peter Gelson's testimonial match in November 1970 and was recommended to the club by former forward and Hammers coach Roger Cross. Scales went straight into the team and made 46 appearances during the 1971–72 season and helped Brentford to promotion to the Third Division. Despite another 44 appearances during the 1972–73 season, the club were relegated straight back to the Fourth Division.

Adept anywhere across the back four and also in midfield, Scales was a regular pick until the 1976–77 season, when he made just 12 appearances. Scales departed the Bees in March 1977 and made 234 appearances and scored seven goals during his six years at Griffin Park.

=== Non-League football ===
Scales dropped into non-League football and signed for Isthmian League Premier Division club Dagenham during the 1977 off-season. He later made over 350 appearances for Essex Senior League club Heybridge Swifts.

== Personal life ==
Prior to joining Brentford and during his career with the club, Scales supplemented his income by working in a school. After his retirement from football, Scales worked as a driving instructor, a clerk for the Inland Revenue, an office manager and a labourer.

== Career statistics ==
Appearances and goals by club, season and competition
Club	Season	League			FA Cup		League Cup		Total	
Club	Season	Division	Apps	Goals	Apps	Goals	Apps	Goals	Apps	Goals
Brentford	1971–72	Fourth Division	43	1	2	0	1	0	46	1
Brentford	1972–73	Third Division	41	0	1	0	2	0	44	0
Brentford	1973–74	Fourth Division	33	1	1	0	1	0	35	1
Brentford	1974–75	Fourth Division	40	1	2	0	2	1	44	2
Brentford	1975–76	Fourth Division	43	3	4	0	3	0	50	3
Brentford	1976–77	Fourth Division	12	0	1	0	2	0	15	0
Career total			212	6	11	0	11	1	234	7

== Honours ==
Brentford

- Football League Fourth Division third-place promotion: 1971–72

Dagenham

- FA Trophy: 1979–80
