= Paul Priddy =

English footballer

Personal information
- Full name: Paul Joseph Priddy
- Date of birth: 11 July 1953 (age 73)
- Place of birth: Isleworth, England
- Position: Goalkeeper

Youth career
- Fulham

Senior career*
Years	Team	Apps	(Gls)
1971	Hayes	1	(0)
1971–1972	Maidenhead United		
1972–1974	Brentford	50	(0)
- Wimbledon
- Walton & Hersham
1975–1977	Brentford	71	(0)
1977–1978	Tooting & Mitcham United	37	(0)
1978	Wimbledon	1	(0)
	Wealdstone	1	(0)
1979	Oxford City	13	(0)
1980–1981	Hayes		
1981–1982	Brentford	1	(0)
1983–1984	Hampton		
1999	Aldershot Town	0	(0)
- * Club domestic league appearances and goals

Paul Joseph Priddy (born 11 July 1953) is an English retired semi-professional footballer who played as a goalkeeper in the Football League for Brentford and Wimbledon. Priddy holds the record as Aldershot Town's oldest-ever player, after he made an appearance in 1999 at the age of 45 years and 270 days.

== Career ==
=== Early years ===
A goalkeeper, Priddy began his career at Fulham, where he was also a member of the ground staff at Craven Cottage. He was released without making an appearance and dropped into non-League football to join Isthmian League club Hayes. He managed just one appearance on the opening day of the 1971–72 season before departing to join Athenian League Premier Division club Maidenhead United, where he remained until the end of the season.

=== Brentford ===
Priddy moved up to the Football League to sign amateur forms with newly-promoted Third Division club Brentford during the 1972–73 pre-season. Despite being signed as cover for Gordon Phillips, Priddy signed a professional contract in October 1972 and held onto the number one jersey for much of the 1972–73 season, but a run of just five wins in 22 games saw the Bees relegated straight back to the Fourth Division. The loan signing of Steve Sherwood saw Priddy lose his place and he departed Griffin Park in 1974, having made 54 appearances.

=== Non-League football ===
Priddy dropped back into non-League football in 1974 and joined high-flying Southern League Premier Division club Wimbledon, where he provided cover for Dickie Guy. He later joined Isthmian League club Walton & Hersham and departed in 1975.

=== Return to Brentford ===
Priddy re-joined Brentford, then still in the Fourth Division, as cover for Bill Glazier in 1975. Glazier quit the club after making just 12 appearances and Priddy went on to hold on to the number one jersey until the appointment of manager Bill Dodgin Jr. the following year. Priddy left Brentford for the second time in May 1977 and made 75 appearances during his second spell with the club.

=== Return to non-League football and second spell with Wimbledon ===
Priddy returned to non-League football in 1977 and joined Isthmian League Premier Division club Tooting & Mitcham United. He returned to Wimbledon for a second spell in October 1978 and with the club by now promoted to the Fourth Division, he made one league appearance deputising for Ray Goddard. Priddy later resumed his non-League career with Wealdstone and Oxford City. He joined Hayes for a second spell in 1980 and made 69 appearances in total for the club.

=== Third spell with Brentford ===
Priddy joined Brentford for a third time on a part-time contract in August 1981, as cover for David McKellar. Now in the Third Division, he made one appearance before departing Griffin Park for the final time at the end of the 1981–82 season. In his three spells with Brentford, Priddy made 130 appearances.

=== Later years ===
Priddy retired in the early 1980s, but came out of retirement to sign with Isthmian League First Division club Hampton in November 1983. A ruptured spleen forced him into retirement for a second time. An injury crisis at Aldershot Town in March 1999 saw Priddy come out of retirement a third time for an Isthmian League Cup semi-final second leg match versus Bromley, in which he helped the club through to the final. The appearance made him Aldershot's oldest-ever player.

== Coaching career ==
=== Aldershot Town ===
Priddy joined Isthmian League club Aldershot Town as goalkeeping coach in July 1992, after being recommended to the club by coach and former Brentford teammate Paul Shrubb. He left the club for a period in November 2001. He remained in the role until late 2009, through the Shots' elevation back to the Football League.

=== AFC Wimbledon ===
Priddy began coaching goalkeepers at non-League club AFC Wimbledon in 2007 and remained in the role until his retirement at the end of the 2012–13 season, by which time the club had been promoted to the Football League.

== Career statistics ==
Appearances and goals by club, season and competition
Club	Season	League			FA Cup		League Cup		Total	
Club	Season	Division	Apps	Goals	Apps	Goals	Apps	Goals	Apps	Goals
Hayes	1971–72	Isthmian League	1	0	—		—		1	0
Brentford	1972–73	Third Division	25	0	0	0	2	0	27	0
Brentford	1973–74	Fourth Division	25	0	1	0	1	0	27	0
Brentford	Total		50	0	1	0	3	0	54	0
Brentford	1975–76	Fourth Division	34	0	4	0	—		38	0
Brentford	1976–77	Fourth Division	37	0	2	0	2	0	41	0
Brentford	Total		71	0	6	0	2	0	79	0
Brentford	1981–82	Third Division	1	0	0	0	0	0	1	0
Career total			123	0	7	0	5	0	135	0
