= Kieron Baker =

English footballer

Personal information
- Full name: Kieron Richard Baker
- Date of birth: 29 October 1949 (age 76)
- Place of birth: Ryde, England
- Position: Goalkeeper

Youth career
- 1965–1967: Fulham
- 1967: Ryde County Old Boys

Senior career*
Years	Team	Apps	(Gls)
1967–1978	AFC Bournemouth	217	(0)
1971	→ Montreal Olympique (loan)	18	(0)
1973	→ Brentford (loan)	6	(0)
1978–1979	Ipswich Town	0	(0)
	→ Norwich City (loan)	0	(0)
1980	Phoenix Fire	0	(0)
1980–1981	Oxford City	38	(0)
1981–1983	Weymouth	75	(0)
1983	Yeovil Town	15	(0)
- * Club domestic league appearances and goals

Kieron Richard Baker (born 29 October 1949) is an English retired professional footballer who made over 210 appearances as a goalkeeper in the Football League for AFC Bournemouth. He also played in Canada.

== Career ==
=== Early years ===
A goalkeeper, Baker began his career as an apprentice at First Division club Fulham in 1965. He played for the Cottagers' youth and reserve teams, but left the club in 1967, to return to his native Isle of Wight for a short spell with Ryde County Old Boys.

=== AFC Bournemouth ===
Baker returned to the mainland to sign for Third Division club Bournemouth & Boscombe Athletic in July 1967. He had to wait until the 1969–70 season to make his debut and made 17 league appearances in a disastrous season which saw the Cherries relegated to Fourth Division. A return to Third Division football in 1971 (under the name 'AFC Bournemouth') saw Baker make just 13 league appearances over the following three seasons, during which he spent periods away on loan at North American Soccer League club Montreal Olympique and Third Division club Brentford.

Baker finally broke through into the first team during the 1973–74 season, when he made 33 league appearances. He was a regular in goal until the end of the 1977–78 season and missed just five league matches in each of his final two seasons at Dean Court. Baker departed Bournemouth in June 1978, having made 248 appearances in 11 years for the club. He was awarded a testimonial for his service to the club, though the match didn't take place.

=== Later professional career ===
In a surprise move, Baker signed for First Division club Ipswich Town for a £20,000 fee during the 1978 off-season. He failed to make a first team appearance and instead made 18 Football Combination appearances for the reserves and had a non-playing loan spell at East Anglian rivals Norwich City. An injury forced Baker to retire from football at the end of the 1978–79 season, but he returned to football to sign for new American Soccer League club Phoenix Fire in early 1980, linking up with former Bournemouth teammate Harry Redknapp. The club folded due to financial irregularities before the beginning of the 1980 season.

=== Non-League football ===
Baker returned to England and linked up again with Harry Redknapp (now assistant to manager Bobby Moore) at Isthmian League First Division club Oxford City in 1980. He made 38 appearances for the club. Baker moved back to the south coast to sign for Alliance Premier League club Weymouth in June 1981. He established himself in the first team and made 110 appearances before departing in 1983. Baker followed Weymouth teammates Trevor Finnigan, Gary Borthwick and Billy Elliott to Alliance Premier League club Yeovil Town in 1983. He made 21 appearances before retiring in November 1983.

== Career statistics ==
Appearances and goals by club, season and competition
Club	Season	League			National Cup		League Cup		Other		Total	
Club	Season	Division	Apps	Goals	Apps	Goals	Apps	Goals	Apps	Goals	Apps	Goals
Montreal Olympique (loan)	1971	North American Soccer League	18	0	—		—		—		18	0
Brentford (loan)	1972–73	Third Division	6	0	—		—		—		6	0
Yeovil Town	1983–84	Alliance Premier League	15	0	2	0	—		4 (Note: Appearances in Bob Lord Challenge Trophy)	0	21	0
Career total			39	0	2	0	0	0	4	0	45	0
