= Jackie Graham =

Scottish footballer and manager

Personal information
- Full name: John Joseph Graham
- Date of birth: 16 July 1946 (age 80)
- Place of birth: Glasgow, Scotland
- Positions: Central midfielder; inside left

Youth career
- –1964: Clydebank Strollers

Senior career*
Years	Team	Apps	(Gls)
1964–1966	Morton	6	(1)
1966–1969	Dundee United	27	(10)
1967	→ Dallas Tornado (loan)	11	(4)
1969–1970	Guildford City		(20)
1970–1980	Brentford	374	(38)
1980–1985	Addlestone & Weybridge Town		
- Farnborough Town
- Hounslow Town
- Woking
- Burnham & Hillingdon
- Staines Town
Total		418	(73)

Managerial career
- 1986–1987: Staines Town
- 1990: Staines Town (joint-caretaker manager)
- * Club domestic league appearances and goals

John Joseph Graham (born 16 July 1946) is a Scottish former professional football player and manager who played as a central midfielder and inside left. He is best remembered for the decade he spent in the Football League with Brentford, for whom he made over 400 appearances. Graham was voted into the Brentford Hall of Fame in December 2013.

== Playing career ==
=== Morton ===
Graham began his senior career in his native Scotland when he joined Scottish League First Division club Morton on 1 August 1964. He scored one goal in six league appearances for the club, before departing at the end of the 1965–66 season.

=== Dundee United ===
Graham moved to fellow top-flight club Dundee United for a £15,000 fee on 20 August 1966. He failed to progress at Tannadice and made just 27 appearances over the course of three seasons, scoring 10 goals. He gained further experience on loan at United Soccer Association club Dallas Tornado during the 1967 season, for whom he scored four goals in 11 appearances. Graham departed Dundee United at the end of the 1968–69 season.

=== Guildford City ===
Graham moved to England during the 1969 off-season to join Southern League First Division club Guildford City. He later revealed that the move was brought about because his girlfriend lived in the city. Graham scored 20 goals from the inside left position during the 1969–70 season and attracted the interest of Football League clubs. He felt he was "getting mucked about quite a bit" by Guildford, after league clubs Wolverhampton Wanderers, Oxford United, Cardiff City, Coventry City and Leeds United all pulled out of deals to sign him, due to Guildford's fee demands.

=== Brentford ===
Graham joined Fourth Division club Brentford for a £2,500 fee in July 1970, having gone behind the back of the Guildford City board to sign for the club. He flourished under Frank Blunstone's management and moved from inside left to central midfield. He was an automatic pick in the midfield and was the team's playmaker and a regular set piece taker, scoring twice directly from corner kicks. Despite contemplating returning to Guildford City during Mike Everitt's tenure as manager, Graham remained with the Bees and made 409 appearances and scored 40 goals in his decade at Griffin Park. He tasted promotion from the Fourth Division in the 1971–72 and 1977–78 seasons and his performances garnered him the club's Players' Player of the Year award in 1971–72 and 1976–77. He was also named captain by Bill Dodgin, after having turned the role down under previous manager John Docherty.

Graham departed Brentford in 1980, after failing to see eye to eye with incoming manager Fred Callaghan. Graham received a standing ovation at Griffin Park when he emerged from the tunnel as a player with Addlestone & Weybridge Town in November 1980, prior to an FA Cup match. Graham was recognised for his service to the Bees by being awarded a testimonial versus Watford in May 1982, from which he earned approximately £3,500. Graham was inducted into the club's Hall of Fame in December 2013.

=== Non-League football ===
Graham dropped back into non-League football to sign for Southern League Southern Division club Addlestone & Weybridge Town in 1980 and was named captain of the club. He later had spells with Farnborough Town, Hounslow Town, Woking, Burnham & Hillingdon and Staines Town.

== Managerial and coaching career ==
Graham had a spell managing Isthmian League First Division club Staines Town during the 1986–87 season and was named as caretaker manager for a period in 1990. He held coaching positions at Staines Town, in Millwall's Centre of Excellence and at Combined Counties League club Cranleigh. Graham later became vice-chairman of the FA Coaches Association.

== Personal life ==
Graham is a Rangers supporter and was friends with Walter Smith, a former teammate at Dundee United. He worked in security for American Airlines at Heathrow Airport. Apart from a period living in a Brentford-owned house in Hounslow, Graham has lived in Guildford since 1969. After retiring from football, Graham initially worked as an engineer and as of 2005 was running a cleaning contractor business in the town. As of September 2022, at age 76, he was still running his business.

== Career statistics ==
Appearances and goals by club, season and competition
Club	Season	League			National cup (Note: Includes Scottish Cup, FA Cup)		League cup (Note: Includes Scottish League Cup, Football League Cup)		Total	
Club	Season	Division	Apps	Goals	Apps	Goals	Apps	Goals	Apps	Goals
Dundee United	1966–67	Scottish First Division	14	9	1	0	1	0	16	9
Dundee United	1967–68	Scottish First Division	10	1	0	0	4	0	14	1
Dundee United	Total		24	10	1	0	5	0	30	10
Dallas Tornado (loan)	1967	United Soccer Association	11	4	—		—		11	4
Brentford	1970–71	Fourth Division	42	6	5	1	1	0	48	7
Brentford	1971–72	Fourth Division	45	7	2	0	1	0	48	7
Brentford	1972–73	Third Division	31	6	1	0	2	0	34	6
Brentford	1973–74	Fourth Division	31	2	1	0	0	0	32	2
Brentford	1974–75	Fourth Division	43	4	2	1	1	0	46	5
Brentford	1975–76	Fourth Division	38	5	4	0	3	0	45	5
Brentford	1976–77	Fourth Division	42	4	2	0	2	0	46	4
Brentford	1977–78	Fourth Division	36	2	2	0	2	0	40	2
Brentford	1978–79	Third Division	35	1	1	0	2	0	38	1
Brentford	1979–80	Third Division	31	1	1	0	0	0	32	1
Brentford	Total		374	38	21	2	14	0	409	40
Career total			409	52	22	2	19	0	450	54

== Honours ==
Brentford

- Football League Fourth Division third-place promotion: 1971–72
- Football League Fourth Division fourth-place promotion: 1977–78

Individual

- Brentford Players' Player of the Year: 1971–72, 1976–77
- Brentford Hall of Fame
