= Steven Tom =

English footballer

Personal information
- Full name: Steven Tom
- Date of birth: 5 February 1951 (age 75)
- Place of birth: Ware, Hertfordshire, England
- Positions: Defender; midfielder

Senior career*
Years	Team	Apps	(Gls)
1969–1971	Queens Park Rangers	0	(0)
1971–1972	Brentford	18	(1)
1972–1976	Barnet	143	(4)
- Ilford
- * Club domestic league appearances and goals

Steven Tom (born 5 February 1951) is an English retired professional footballer who played as a defender in the Football League for Brentford. He later made over 150 appearances for Southern League club Barnet.

== Playing career ==
=== Brentford ===
Tom began his career at Queens Park Rangers and joined Fourth Division club Brentford in 1971. He made 21 appearances and scored one goal, on his debut, during the 1971–72 season, in which the Bees won promotion to the Third Division with a third-place finish. Tom was released at the end of the season.

=== Non-league football ===
After his release from Brentford, Tom dropped into non-League football and played for Barnet and Ilford in the Southern and Isthmian leagues respectively.

== Personal life ==
After his retirement from football, Tom worked as a black cab driver.

== Honours ==
Brentford

- Football League Fourth Division third-place promotion: 1971–72

== Career statistics ==
Appearances and goals by club, season and competition
Club	Season	League			FA Cup		League Cup		Other		Total	
Club	Season	Division	Apps	Goals	Apps	Goals	Apps	Goals	Apps	Goals	Apps	Goals
Brentford	1971–72	Fourth Division	18	1	2	0	1	0	―		21	1
Barnet	1972–73	Southern League Premier Division	38	1	5	0	―		3 (Note: Appearances in FA Trophy)	0	46	1
Barnet	1973–74	Southern League Premier Division	42	1	2	0	―		1	0	45	1
Barnet	1974–75	Southern League Premier Division	41	1	2	0	―		1	0	44	1
Barnet	1975–76	Southern League First Division North	22	1	1	0	―		0	0	23	1
Barnet	Total		143	4	10	0	―		5	0	158	4
Career total			161	5	12	0	1	0	5	0	179	5
