= Gordon Neilson (footballer) =

Scottish footballer

Personal information
- Full name: Gordon Neilson
- Date of birth: 28 May 1947 (age 79)
- Place of birth: Glasgow, Scotland
- Position: Right winger

Youth career
- Glasgow United
- 1964–1966: Arsenal

Senior career*
Years	Team	Apps	(Gls)
1966–1968	Arsenal	14	(2)
1968–1972	Brentford	92	(15)
1972–1973	Hillingdon Borough	31	(9)
- * Club domestic league appearances and goals

Gordon Neilson (born 28 May 1947) is a Scottish retired professional footballer who played in the Football League for Arsenal and Brentford as a right winger.

== Playing career ==
=== Arsenal ===
A right winger, Neilson joined First Division club Arsenal from amateur club Glasgow United in April 1964. He signed a professional contract in June 1964 and featured for the youth team which lost to Everton in the 1965 FA Youth Cup Final. He also played for the reserve and 'A' teams and had to wait until 12 March 1966 to make his first team debut, which came in a 1–0 league defeat to Everton. He made just one further appearance during the 1965–66 season, in a 1–0 victory over Leicester City on the final day.

Neilson had to wait until 19 November 1966 to make his next appearance, which came in a 1–0 victory over Fulham. He scored his first goal for the club in the following game, a 2–1 defeat to Nottingham Forest. He made a breakthrough into the first team and scored his second goal for the club in a 3–0 victory over Blackpool on 21 January 1967 and his third in the following game, a 3–0 FA Cup third round victory over Bristol Rovers. Neilson's run in the team came to an end in late February 1967 and failed to make any further appearances. He departed Highbury in October 1968, having made 17 appearances and scored three goals for the Gunners.

=== Brentford ===
Neilson signed for Fourth Division club Brentford for a £10,000 fee in October 1968. In a time of financial uncertainty for the Griffin Park club, Neilson's £10,000 fee represented a major gamble. After making 29 appearances during the 1968–69 season, he made 39 appearances during the 1969–70 season and helped the Bees to a fifth-place finish. His appearances tailed away during the early 1970s and he made just 13 appearances during the 1971–72 season, in which Brentford secured promotion back to Third Division. Neilson was released after the season and made 104 appearances and scored 15 goals during his time with the Bees.

=== Hillingdon Borough ===
Neilson ended his career with a spell at Southern League Premier Division club Hillingdon Borough during the 1972–73 season.

== Personal life ==
After his retirement from football, Neilson worked as a computer programmer later for the Bank of Tokyo-Mitsubishi in the City of London.

== Honours ==
Brentford

- Football League Fourth Division third-place promotion: 1971–72

== Career statistics ==
Appearances and goals by club, season and competition
Club	Season	League			FA Cup		League Cup		Total	
Club	Season	Division	Apps	Goals	Apps	Goals	Apps	Goals	Apps	Goals
Arsenal	1965–66	First Division	2	0	0	0	0	0	2	0
Arsenal	1966–67	First Division	12	2	3	1	0	0	15	3
Arsenal	Total		14	2	3	1	0	0	17	3
Brentford	1968–69	Fourth Division	27	6	2	0	—		29	6
Brentford	1969–70	Fourth Division	34	3	2	0	3	0	39	3
Brentford	1970–71	Fourth Division	19	4	3	0	1	0	23	4
Brentford	1971–72	Fourth Division	12	2	0	0	1	0	13	2
Brentford	Total		92	15	7	0	5	0	104	15
Career total			106	17	10	1	5	0	121	18
