= Michael Allen (footballer) =

English footballer

Personal information
- Full name: Michael Allen
- Date of birth: 30 March 1949 (age 77)
- Place of birth: South Shields, England
- Positions: Left back; midfielder

Youth career
- 1966–1967: Middlesbrough

Senior career*
Years	Team	Apps	(Gls)
1967–1971	Middlesbrough	35	(0)
1971–1979	Brentford	205	(11)
- Whitby Town
- * Club domestic league appearances and goals

Michael Allen (born 30 March 1949) is an English retired professional footballer who made over 230 appearances in the Football League, most notably for Brentford. A left back, he also played League football for Middlesbrough.

== Playing career ==
=== Middlesbrough ===
Born in South Shields, Allen began his career at Middlesbrough in 1966 and made his professional debut on 30 December 1967, in a 2–1 Second Division defeat to Bolton Wanderers. He scored his only goal for the club in a 1–1 FA Cup third round draw with Millwall on 4 January 1969. Allen failed to break through into the first team, with his best tally being 15 appearances during the 1969–70 season. He departed Ayresome Park a few months into the 1971–72 season, having made 38 appearances and scored one goal for Middlesbrough.

=== Brentford ===
Allen dropped through the leagues to join Fourth Division high-flyers Brentford in October 1971, for a £10,000 fee. Operating as a midfielder, his 33 appearances during the 1971–72 season helped the club to a third-place finish and promotion to the Third Division. The Bees were relegated straight back to the Fourth Division and after moving to his preferred left back position in 1974, Allen put in a Player of the Year award-winning season in 1975–76, when he missed only one league match. Allen helped the club secure promotion back to the Third Division in 1977–78, with a fourth-place finish. He made just seven appearances in the Third Division and departed Griffin Park at the end of the 1978–79 season. Allen made 255 appearances and scored 13 goals during nearly 9 years with the Bees.

=== Whitby Town ===
In 1979, Allen returned to his native northeast and ended his career with a spell as player-coach at Northern League club Whitby Town.

== Personal life ==
After retiring from football, Allen moved to Marton and worked for ICI Wilton.

== Career statistics ==
Appearances and goals by club, season and competition
Club	Season	League			FA Cup		League Cup		Total	
Club	Season	Division	Apps	Goals	Apps	Goals	Apps	Goals	Apps	Goals
Middlesbrough	1967–68	Second Division	6	0	0	0	0	0	6	0
Middlesbrough	1968–69	Second Division	4	0	2	1	0	0	6	1
Middlesbrough	1969–70	Second Division	15	0	0	0	0	0	15	0
Middlesbrough	1970–71	Second Division	6	0	0	0	1	0	7	0
Middlesbrough	1971–72	Second Division	4	0	—		0	0	4	0
Middlesbrough	Total		35	0	2	1	1	0	38	1
Brentford	1971–72	Fourth Division	30	3	2	0	—		32	3
Brentford	1972–73	Third Division	26	4	1	1	1	0	28	5
Brentford	1973–74	Fourth Division	32	2	1	1	1	0	34	3
Brentford	1974–75	Fourth Division	32	0	1	0	2	0	35	0
Brentford	1975–76	Fourth Division	45	1	4	0	3	0	52	1
Brentford	1976–77	Fourth Division	40	1	2	0	0	0	42	1
Brentford	1977–78	Fourth Division	21	0	2	0	2	0	25	0
Brentford	1978–79	Third Division	7	0	0	0	0	0	7	0
Brentford	Total		205	11	13	2	9	0	227	13
Career total			240	11	15	3	10	0	265	14

== Honours ==
Brentford

- Football League Fourth Division third-place promotion: 1971–72
- Football League Fourth Division fourth-place promotion: 1977–78

Individual

- Brentford Supporters' Player of the Year: 1975–76
- Brentford Players' Player of the Year: 1975–76
