= Frank D'Arcy =

English footballer (1946–2024)

Personal information
- Full name: Francis Anthony D'Arcy
- Date of birth: 8 December 1946
- Place of birth: Liverpool, England
- Date of death: 15 June 2024 (aged 77)
- Position: Left-back

Senior career*
Years	Team	Apps	(Gls)
1965–1971	Everton	16	(0)
1972–1973	Tranmere Rovers	8	(1)
- Kirkby Town
Total		24	(1)
- * Club domestic league appearances and goals

Frank D'Arcy (8 December 1946 – 15 June 2024) was an English professional footballer who played as a left-back in the Football League for Everton and Tranmere Rovers. He was part of the Everton side that won the First Division in the 1969–70 season; making five appearances in the process. He later played for Kirkby Town. D'Arcy died on 15 June 2024, at the age of 77.
