= John O'Mara =

English footballer

Personal information
- Full name: John O'Mara
- Date of birth: 19 March 1947 (age 79)
- Place of birth: Farnworth, England
- Position: Forward

Youth career
- Bury

Senior career*
Years	Team	Apps	(Gls)
1965–1967	Gillingham	0	(0)
1967	→ Dover (loan)		
1967–1968	Margate	16	(5)
1968–1971	Wimbledon	124	(50)
1971–1972	Brentford	53	(28)
1972–1974	Blackburn Rovers	35	(10)
1974	Chelmsford City	12	(5)
1974	Bradford City	3	(1)
1975–1976	Germiston Callies		
1976–1977	Margate	16	(6)
1977	Maidstone United		
1977–1978	Margate	48	(21)
1978–1979	Dover		
1979–1980	Ramsgate		
- * Club domestic league appearances and goals

John O'Mara (born 19 March 1947) is an English former professional footballer who played as a forward. During a nomadic career, he played in the Football League for Brentford, Blackburn Rovers and Bradford City.

== Career ==
=== Early years ===
Born in Farnworth, O'Mara began his career in the youth system at Second Division club Bury, before moving to Third Division club Gillingham in October 1965. He failed to make a senior appearance for the Gills and joined Southern League First Division club Dover on loan in February 1967, scoring six goals in what remained of the 1966–67 season, helping the club to Kent Senior Cup success and promotion to the Premier Division as champions. O'Mara returned to Gillingham at the end of the season and departed the club in June 1967.

=== Margate ===
O'Mara joined Southern League Premier Division club Margate in June 1967. Injury, fitness and disciplinary problems hampered O'Mara's early months with the club and he spent much of the 1967–68 season in the reserve team, but managed 16 first team appearances and five goals before being released at the end of the season.

=== Wimbledon ===
O'Mara joined Southern League Premier Division club Wimbledon during the 1968 off-season, after having impressed the club's staff with his performance in a match against the Dons while a Margate player in December 1967. He had a prolific spell with the club, scoring 50 goals in 121 games, before departing in March 1971.

=== Brentford ===
O'Mara secured a move to the Football League when he joined Fourth Division club Brentford for a £1,500 fee in March 1971. He made 9 appearances in what remained of the 1970–71 season and scored two goals. O'Mara was a revelation in his first full season at Griffin Park, scoring 25 goals in 40 games to fire the Bees to promotion to the Third Division with a third-place finish. He was presented with the club's Player of the Year award and won the Gallagher's Divisional Footballer of the Year award, chosen by the managers of all the Fourth Division clubs. O'Mara made five appearances and scored one goal in the early part of the 1972–73 season, before departing Brentford in September 1972. He scored 28 goals in 57 games for the club. A possible transfer back to Brentford under then-manager and former teammate John Docherty fell through after Docherty's sacking in 1976.

=== Later years ===
==== 1972–1975 ====
O'Mara joined Third Division club Blackburn Rovers in September 1972 for a then-club record £50,000. He failed to truly settle at Ewood Park, but still managed 10 goals in 35 league games before departing at the end of the 1973–74 season. Following a spell back in non-League football with Southern League Premier Division club Chelmsford City, O'Mara made a return to league football when he signed for Fourth Division club Bradford City in December 1974. His time with the Bantams was short-lived, making three league appearances and scoring one goal.

==== 1975–1977 ====
O'Mara fulfilled a personal ambition by moving to South Africa in 1975, having wished to emigrate to the country in 1967, a request which was denied by his parents. He joined National Soccer League club Germiston Callies, playing the 1975 and 1976 seasons with the club. O'Mara returned to Southern League Premier Division strugglers Margate in November 1976, as a favour to manager Les Riggs. He managed six goals in 16 appearances before departing the club in March 1977, after encountering hostility from the Margate supporters.

==== 1977–1978 ====
Following a six-month spell with Southern League Premier Division club Maidstone United, O'Mara joined Margate for the third time in September 1977, initially on a game-by-game basis. Now playing Southern League First Division football, O'Mara found his form and scored 19 goals in 35 games, to help send the Gate back to the Premier Division as champions. He remained with the club into the 1978–79 season and scored two goals in 13 appearances (mostly as a substitute), before departing Hartsdown Park for the final time in November 1978. In his third spell with Margate, O'Mara scored 21 goals in 48 games. Across his three spells with the club, O'Mara made 80 appearances and scored 32 goals.

==== 1978–1980 ====
In November 1978, O'Mara joined Southern League First Division South club Dover for the second time. Initially appearing on a trial basis, he later signed permanently and scored 10 goals to help Dover back to the Premier Division as 1978–79 First Division South champions. O'Mara played into the 1979–80 season and departed the club in November. O'Mara joined Kent League First Division club Ramsgate in November 1979 and scored four goals during the remainder of the 1979–80 season. He retired from football after the campaign, but made a comeback in 1986 at age 39, for local Margate amateur club Oddfellows, managed by former Margate teammate Ray Summers.

== Personal life ==
An engineer by trade, O'Mara worked as a miner and served his apprenticeship at Chislet Colliery at 1968, delaying his move from Margate to Wimbledon to complete it. When O'Mara returned to Thanet in 1976, he worked at the Betteshanger Colliery. He later owned a plant hire company and drove a car transporter. As of 2012, O'Mara was residing in Margate.

== Career statistics ==
Appearances and goals by club, season and competition
Club	Season	League			FA Cup		League Cup		Total	
Club	Season	Division	Apps	Goals	Apps	Goals	Apps	Goals	Apps	Goals
Brentford	1970–71	Fourth Division	9	2	—		—		9	2
Brentford	1971–72	Fourth Division	40	25	2	2	1	0	43	27
Brentford	1972–73	Third Division	4	1	—		1	0	5	1
Career total			53	28	2	2	1	0	56	30

== Honours ==
Brentford

- Football League Fourth Division third-place promotion: 1971–72

Margate

- Southern League First Division South: 1977–78

Dover

- Southern League First Division South: 1978–79
