= 1971–72 Brentford F.C. season =

English football team season

Brentford
1971–72 season
- Chairman: Eric Radley-Smith (until January 1972); Les Davey & Walter Wheatley (from January 1972)
- Manager: Frank Blunstone
- Stadium: Griffin Park
- Fourth Division: 3rd (promoted)
- FA Cup: First round
- League Cup: First round
- Top goalscorer: League: O'Mara (25); All: O'Mara (27)
- Highest home attendance: 18,521
- Lowest home attendance: 8,712
- Average home league attendance: 11,738
Home colours

During the 1971–72 English football season, Brentford competed in the Football League Fourth Division. The club led the division for much of the first half of the season and 10 wins in the final 14 matches secured automatic promotion with a 3rd-place finish.

== Season summary ==
Despite the reduction of the club's debt to a manageable level and an average attendance higher than all but the top three finishers in the Third Division, Fourth Division Brentford went into the 1971–72 season with a squad of just 14 professionals. Long-time goalkeeper Chic Brodie was released, as was bit-part winger Brian Tawse and in came two defensive youngsters on free transfers – Terry Scales and Steven Tom.

Despite the club record £30,000 departure of Roger Cross to rivals Fulham and Alan Hawley also moving to Craven Cottage on loan, Brentford's 12-man squad met pre-season expectations in the early part of the season, holding onto top spot intermittently until a minor blip in October and November 1971. Utility player Michael Allen was signed from Middlesbrough for an £8,000 fee in October and proved to be a vital cog in the midfield. The team owed much of its success to prolific goalscoring from John O'Mara, with the centre forward reaching 20 goals for the season after a 6–2 thrashing of Darlington on 8 January 1972, a result which made Brentford the top scorers in the Football League and was also notable for a 13-minute hattrick from John Docherty.

After another blip caused by the suspension of John O'Mara for five weeks dropped Brentford out of the promotion places, the team was buoyed by the loan signing of winger Stewart Houston and entered the final five weeks of the season strongly, winning five matches in a row in March. Two draws and a defeat over Easter threatened to drop the Bees out of the promotion places, but four successive wins meant that automatic promotion was assured with two matches to play, when captain Bobby Ross' penalty was enough to beat Exeter City at Griffin Park on 22 April. Despite going top of the Fourth Division after victory over Barrow in the following match, a 3–0 defeat away to Workington in the final match of the season dropped the Bees to a 3rd-place finish.

Two club records were set during the season:

- Most clean sheets in a Football League season: 22 – Gordon Phillips
- Fewest players used in a Football League season: 14

Brentford finished top of the Fourth Division charts in the following statistical categories:

- Best away record
- Highest overall goal difference
- Highest away goal difference
- Highest average attendance

== League table ==
Pos	Team	Pld	W	D	L	GF	GA	GAv	Pts	Promotion or relegation
1	Grimsby Town (C, P)	46	28	7	11	88	56	1.571	63	Promotion to the Third Division
2	Southend United (P)	46	24	12	10	81	55	1.473	60	Promotion to the Third Division
3	Brentford (P)	46	24	11	11	76	44	1.727	59	Promotion to the Third Division
4	Scunthorpe United (P)	46	22	13	11	56	37	1.514	57	Promotion to the Third Division
5	Lincoln City	46	21	14	11	77	59	1.305	56	Qualified for the Watney Cup (Note: The two teams who scored the most goals in each division, and did not qualify for Europe and were not promoted, qualified for the Watney Cup.)

Source: rsssf.com
(C) Champions; (P) Promoted

== Results ==
Brentford's goal tally listed first.

=== Legend ===
Win	Draw	Loss

=== Pre-season and friendlies ===
Date	Opponent	Venue	Result	Scorer(s)
31 July 1971	Southampton	H	1–3	Untraced (og)
4 August 1971	Hillingdon Borough	A	2–1	O'Mara, Scales
7 August 1971	Oxford United	H	2–4	O'Mara, Cross
2 May 1972	Guernsey XI	A	6–0	O'Mara (4), Houston, Bence
4 May 1972	Guernsey XI	A	7–1	O'Mara (2), Houston (2), Ross, Graham, Docherty
9 May 1972	Wimbledon	A	2–2	Docherty, Graham

=== Football League Fourth Division ===
No.	Date	Opponent	Venue	Result	Attendance	Scorer(s)
1	14 August 1971	Bury	A	2–0	2,957	Gelson, Tom
2	21 August 1971	Aldershot	H	1–1	8,920	Turner
3	28 August 1971	Darlington	A	0–0	2,514	
4	30 August 1971	Barrow	H	4–0	8,866	O'Mara, Cross, Turner, Ross
5	4 September 1971	Hartlepool	H	6–0	8,712	Turner (2), O'Mara (3), Cross
6	11 September 1971	Grimsby Town	A	1–3	11,683	O'Mara
7	18 September 1971	Peterborough United	H	5–1	8,770	Neilson, Graham, Docherty, O'Mara, Ross
8	25 September 1971	Chester	A	0–0	4,088	
9	27 September 1971	Stockport County	H	2–0	10,445	Ross (2)
10	2 October 1971	Northampton Town	H	6–1	11,004	Gelson, Docherty, O'Mara (3), Neilson
11	8 October 1971	Southport	A	0–0	5,371	
12	16 October 1971	Bury	H	2–0	9,851	O'Mara, Graham
13	20 October 1971	Reading	A	1–2	10,473	O'Mara
14	23 October 1971	Southend United	H	1–2	14,001	O'Mara
15	30 October 1971	Scunthorpe United	A	0–0	6,121	
16	6 November 1971	Newport County	H	3–1	10,484	Docherty, Ross (2, 1 pen)
17	13 November 1971	Colchester United	A	1–1	6,898	O'Mara
18	27 November 1971	Gillingham	H	1–3	10,945	Ross
19	4 December 1971	Exeter City	A	1–0	3,809	O'Mara
20	11 December 1971	Southport	H	1–0	9,624	Peat (og)
21	18 December 1971	Hartlepool	A	2–1	2,199	Allen (2)
22	27 December 1971	Crewe Alexandra	H	1–0	18,237	O'Mara
23	1 January 1972	Peterborough United	A	2–2	7,027	O'Mara (2)
24	8 January 1972	Darlington	H	6–2	10,582	Ross (pen), O'Mara (2), Docherty (3)
25	15 January 1972	Lincoln City	A	1–4	7,552	O'Mara
26	25 January 1972	Stockport County	A	1–0	3,247	Ross
27	29 January 1972	Reading	H	1–2	12,144	Docherty
28	5 February 1972	Cambridge United	A	1–1	6,861	Graham
29	12 February 1972	Southend United	A	1–3	9,841	Ross (pen)
30	19 February 1972	Scunthorpe United	H	0–3	11,912	
31	26 February 1972	Newport County	A	0–0	3,271	
32	4 March 1972	Colchester United	H	0–2	9,210	
33	13 March 1972	Lincoln City	H	2–0	12,065	O'Mara, Scales
34	18 March 1972	Aldershot	A	2–1	6,989	O'Mara, Ross
35	21 March 1972	Doncaster Rovers	A	3–0	5,256	Graham (2), Ross
36	25 March 1972	Grimsby Town	H	2–0	14,635	Docherty, O'Mara
37	27 March 1972	Workington	H	2–0	13,972	Docherty, Houston
38	31 March 1972	Chester	H	1–1	18,521	Docherty
39	1 April 1972	Crewe Alexandra	A	1–2	2,072	Docherty
40	3 April 1972	Northampton Town	A	0–0	5,314	
41	8 April 1972	Cambridge United	H	2–1	9,061	Docherty, Graham
42	15 April 1972	Gillingham	A	1–0	5,819	Docherty
43	17 April 1972	Doncaster Rovers	H	2–1	13,484	O'Mara (2)
44	22 April 1972	Exeter City	H	1–0	14,540	Ross (pen)
45	24 April 1972	Barrow	A	3–0	2,646	Houston, Allen, Graham
46	29 April 1972	Workington	A	0–3	1,751	

=== FA Cup ===
Round	Date	Opponent	Venue	Result	Attendance	Scorer(s)
1R	20 November 1971	Swansea City	A	1–1	7,915	O'Mara
1R (replay)	22 November 1971	Swansea City	H	2–3	15,000	Ross, O'Mara

=== Football League Cup ===
Round	Date	Opponent	Venue	Result	Attendance	Scorer
1R	18 August 1971	Colchester United	A	1–3	6,125	Ross

- Sources: 100 Years of Brentford, The Big Brentford Book of the Seventies, Statto

== Playing squad ==
Players' ages are as of the opening day of the 1971–72 season.

Pos.	Name	Nat.	Date of birth (age)	Signed from	Signed in	Notes
Goalkeepers
GK	Gordon Phillips	(England)	17 November 1946 (aged 24)	Hayes	1963	
Defenders
DF	Paul Bence	(England)	21 December 1948 (aged 22)	Reading	1970	
DF	Peter Gelson	(England)	18 October 1941 (aged 29)	Youth	1961	
DF	Alan Hawley	(England)	7 June 1946 (aged 25)	Youth	1962	Loaned to Fulham
DF	Alan Nelmes	(England)	20 October 1948 (aged 22)	Chelsea	1967	
DF	Terry Scales	(England)	18 January 1951 (aged 20)	West Ham United	1971	
DF	Steven Tom	(England)	1 May 1951 (aged 20)	Queens Park Rangers	1971	
Midfielders
MF	Michael Allen	(England)	30 March 1949 (aged 22)	Middlesbrough	1971	
MF	John Docherty	(Scotland)	29 April 1940 (aged 31)	Reading	1970	
MF	Jackie Graham	(Scotland)	16 July 1946 (aged 25)	Guildford City	1970	
MF	Gordon Neilson	(Scotland)	28 May 1947 (aged 24)	Arsenal	1968	
MF	Brian Turner	(New Zealand)	31 July 1949 (aged 22)	Portsmouth	1970	
Forwards
FW	Stewart Houston	(Scotland)	20 August 1949 (aged 21)	Chelsea	1972	On loan from Chelsea
FW	John O'Mara	(England)	19 March 1947 (aged 24)	Wimbledon	1971	
FW	Bobby Ross (c)	(Scotland)	10 May 1942 (aged 29)	Shrewsbury Town	1966	
Players who left the club mid-season
FW	Roger Cross	(England)	20 October 1948 (aged 22)	West Ham United	1970	Transferred to Fulham
FW	Trevor Dawkins	(England)	17 October 1945 (aged 25)	Crystal Palace	1971	Returned to Crystal Palace after loan
FW	Ken Wallace	(England)	8 June 1952 (aged 19)	West Ham United	1972	Returned to West Ham United after loan

- Sources: The Big Brentford Book of the Seventies, Timeless Bees

== Coaching staff ==
Name	Role
(England) Frank Blunstone	Manager
(England) Eddie Lyons	Trainer

== Statistics ==
=== Appearances and goals ===
Substitute appearances in brackets.

Pos	Nat	Name	League		FA Cup		League Cup		Total	
Pos	Nat	Name	Apps	Goals	Apps	Goals	Apps	Goals	Apps	Goals
GK	(England)	Gordon Phillips	46	0	2	0	1	0	49	0
DF	(England)	Paul Bence	32 (2)	0	2	0	1	0	35 (2)	0
DF	(England)	Peter Gelson	36 (1)	2	0	0	1	0	37 (1)	2
DF	(England)	Alan Hawley	20	0	0	0	0	0	20	0
DF	(England)	Alan Nelmes	46	0	2	0	1	0	49	0
DF	(England)	Terry Scales	43	1	2	0	1	0	46	1
DF	(England)	Steven Tom	13 (5)	1	2	0	1	0	16 (5)	1
MF	(England)	Michael Allen	29 (1)	3	2	0	—		31 (1)	3
MF	(Scotland)	John Docherty	44	13	2	0	0	0	46	13
MF	(Scotland)	Jackie Graham	45	7	2	0	1	0	48	7
MF	(Scotland)	Gordon Neilson	8 (4)	2	0	0	0 (1)	0	8 (5)	2
MF	(New Zealand)	Brian Turner	34 (1)	4	2	0	1	0	37 (1)	4
FW	(England)	Roger Cross	5	2	—		1	0	6	2
FW	(England)	John O'Mara	40	25	2	2	1	0	43	27
FW	(Scotland)	Bobby Ross	44 (1)	13	2	1	1	1	47 (1)	15
Players loaned in during the season
FW	(England)	Trevor Dawkins	3 (1)	0	—		—		3 (1)	0
FW	(Scotland)	Stewart Houston	15	2	—		—		15	2
FW	(England)	Ken Wallace	3	0	—		—		3	0

- Players listed in italics left the club mid-season.
- Source: 100 Years of Brentford

=== Goalscorers ===
Pos.	Nat	Player	FL4	FAC	FLC	Total
FW	(England)	John O'Mara	25	2	0	27
FW	(Scotland)	Bobby Ross	13	1	1	15
MF	(Scotland)	John Docherty	13	0	0	13
MF	(Scotland)	Jackie Graham	7	0	0	7
MF	(New Zealand)	Brian Turner	4	0	0	4
MF	(England)	Michael Allen	3	0	—	3
FW	(Scotland)	Stewart Houston	2	—	—	2
FW	(England)	Roger Cross	2	—	0	2
DF	(England)	Peter Gelson	2	0	0	2
MF	(Scotland)	Gordon Neilson	2	0	0	2
DF	(England)	Terry Scales	1	0	0	1
DF	(England)	Steven Tom	1	0	0	1
Opponents			1	0	0	1
Total			76	3	1	80

- Players listed in italics left the club mid-season.
- Source: 100 Years of Brentford

=== Management ===
Name	Nat	From	To	Record All Comps					Record League				
Name	Nat	From	To	P	W	D	L	W %	P	W	D	L	W %
Frank Blunstone	(England)	14 August 1971	29 April 1972	49	24	12	13	48.98	46	24	11	11	52.17

=== Summary ===
Games played	49 (46 Fourth Division, 2 FA Cup, 1 League Cup)
Games won	24 (24 Fourth Division, 0 FA Cup, 0 League Cup)
Games drawn	12 (11 Fourth Division, 1 FA Cup, 0 League Cup)
Games lost	13 (11 Fourth Division, 1 FA Cup, 1 League Cup)
Goals scored	80 (76 Fourth Division, 3 FA Cup, 1 League Cup)
Goals conceded	51 (44 Fourth Division, 4 FA Cup, 3 League Cup)
Clean sheets	22 (22 Fourth Division, 0 FA Cup, 0 League Cup)
Biggest league win	6–0 versus Hartlepool, 4 September 1971
Worst league defeat	3–0 on two occasions; 4–1 versus Lincoln City, 15 January 1972
Most appearances	49, Alan Nelmes, Gordon Phillips (46 Fourth Division, 2 FA Cup, 1 League Cup)
Top scorer (league)	25, John O'Mara
Top scorer (all competitions)	27, John O'Mara

== Transfers & loans ==
Players transferred in
Date	Pos.	Name	Previous club	Fee	Ref.
June 1971	DF	(England) Steven Tom	(England) Crystal Palace	Free	
July 1971	DF	(England) Terry Scales	(England) West Ham United	Free	
October 1971	MF	(England) Michael Allen	(England) Middlesbrough	£8,000	
Players loaned in
Date from	Pos.	Name	From	Date to	Ref.
September 1971	FW	(England) Trevor Dawkins	(England) Crystal Palace	October 1971	
February 1972	FW	(England) Ken Wallace	(England) West Ham United	March 1972	
March 1972	FW	(Scotland) Stewart Houston	(England) Chelsea	End of season	
Players transferred out
Date	Pos.	Name	Subsequent club	Fee	Ref.
September 1971	FW	(England) Roger Cross	(England) Fulham	£30,000	
Players loaned out
Date from	Pos.	Name	To	Date to	Ref.
September 1971	MF	(England) Alan Hawley	(England) Fulham	October 1971	
Players released
Date	Pos.	Name	Subsequent club	Join date	Ref.
May 1972	MF	(Scotland) Gordon Neilson	(England) Hillingdon Borough	1972	
May 1972	DF	(England) Steven Tom	(England) Barnet	1972	
May 1972	MF	(New Zealand) Brian Turner	(New Zealand) Mount Wellington	1972	

== Awards ==
- Supporters' Player of the Year: John O'Mara
- Players' Player of the Year: Jackie Graham
- Gallaghers Divisional Footballer of the Year: John O'Mara
- Football League Fourth Division Manager of the Month: Frank Blunstone (September 1971, March 1972)
