= Stan Webb (footballer, born 1947) =

English footballer

Personal information
- Full name: Stanley John Webb
- Date of birth: 6 December 1947 (age 78)
- Place of birth: Middlesbrough, England
- Height: 6 ft 0 in (1.83 m)
- Position: Forward

Youth career
- Middlesbrough

Senior career*
Years	Team	Apps	(Gls)
1967–1971	Middlesbrough	28	(6)
1971–1972	Carlisle United	26	(5)
1972–1974	Brentford	39	(8)
1974–1976	Darlington	74	(21)
1976–197?	Whitby Town		(20)
- Guisborough Town
- * Club domestic league appearances and goals

Stanley John Webb (born 6 December 1947) is an English former footballer who scored 40 goals from 167 appearances in the Football League playing for Middlesbrough, Carlisle United, Brentford and Darlington in the 1970s. A forward, he also played non-league football for clubs including Whitby Town and Guisborough Town, for whom he scored the club's first FA Cup goal, in the 1978–79 first qualifying round against Consett.

Webb attended Middlesbrough High School, and captained their under-15 basketball team to the English Schools championship in 1963.

== Honours ==
- Darlington F.C. Player of the Year: 1974–75
