= Peter Gelson =

English footballer (1941–2021)

Personal information
- Full name: Peter William John Gelson
- Date of birth: 18 October 1941
- Place of birth: Hammersmith, England
- Date of death: 26 April 2021 (aged 79)
- Place of death: Staines-upon-Thames, England
- Positions: Centre back; wing half

Youth career
- 1958–1960: Brentford

Senior career*
Years	Team	Apps	(Gls)
1960–1975	Brentford	471	(17)
1974–1977	Hillingdon Borough		
1977	Hounslow		
1977–1978	Hillingdon Borough		
1978–1979	Walton & Hersham		
- * Club domestic league appearances and goals

Peter William John Gelson (18 October 1941 – 26 April 2021) was an English professional footballer who played in the Football League for Brentford as a centre back and wing half. A cult hero amongst the club's supporters, he is third on the all-time Brentford appearances list with 516. In 2013, Gelson placed second in a Football League 125th Anniversary poll of Brentford's all-time fan favourites and was inducted into the Brentford Hall of Fame in November 2014.

== Career ==
=== Brentford ===
Joining Brentford at a young age, Gelson progressed through the club's youth, 'A' and reserve teams before making his professional debut at age 19 in a 2–0 Third Division defeat to Halifax Town on 22 August 1961. Despite still being a part-time player, Gelson quickly established himself in the first team as a wing half, making 28 appearances during the 1961–62 season, a campaign which saw Brentford relegated to the Fourth Division.

Gelson was a key player in Brentford's 1962–63 Fourth Division title-winning season and made 32 appearances, but he remained part-time and did not sign a professional contract until 1964. He was awarded the captaincy in August 1966, but a loss of form saw him lose it to Bobby Ross four months later. Gelson was known for his long-range goals and scored three times from behind the halfway line. A "hard man" as a player, in 1970 he ended the career of Colchester United's Bobby Howlett in a challenge which resulted in a broken leg for the Us defender.

Gelson went on to be a fixture at centre back until his final appearance for the club in September 1974. He left Brentford shortly after, having made 516 appearances in all competitions for the club. In recognition of his service to the club, Gelson was awarded testimonials in 1970 and 1975, earning him £3,630. He was inducted into the Brentford Hall of Fame in November 2014 and remained a season ticket holder up until the final seasons at Griffin Park.

=== Non-League football ===
After his departure from Brentford, Gelson played on in non-League football, appearing for Hillingdon Borough (two spells), Hounslow and Walton & Hersham. In 1985, he was active in forming the Staines Town Veterans' team, for which he also played, making his final appearance at the age of 66 on the final day of the 2007–08 season.

== Personal life ==
In his early days as a part-time player at Brentford, Gelson worked in telecommunications for the Post Office. His Brentford teammate Gordon Phillips remained a lifelong friend and the pair were godparents to each other's children. After retiring from football, Gelson found work at Heathrow Airport and worked in security with British Airways and Qatar Airways. He worked for a number of years in Doha, Qatar as a loadmaster for Khalifa bin Hamad Al Thani's multiple private aircraft. He retired and returned to the UK in 2007. Gelson was married and as of June 2010, had five grandchildren.

== Career statistics ==
Appearances and goals by club, season and competition
Club	Season	League			FA Cup		League Cup		Total	
Club	Season	Division	Apps	Goals	Apps	Goals	Apps	Goals	Apps	Goals
Brentford	1961–62	Third Division	24	1	4	0	0	0	28	1
Brentford	1962–63	Fourth Division	29	0	1	0	1	0	31	0
Brentford	1963–64	Third Division	2	0	0	0	0	0	2	0
Brentford	1964–65	Third Division	42	1	4	0	0	0	46	1
Brentford	1965–66	Third Division	34	2	2	0	0	0	36	2
Brentford	1966–67	Fourth Division	45	0	4	0	3	0	52	0
Brentford	1967–68	Fourth Division	43	5	2	0	1	0	46	5
Brentford	1968–69	Fourth Division	43	2	2	0	5	0	49	2
Brentford	1969–70	Fourth Division	43	4	2	0	3	1	48	5
Brentford	1970–71	Fourth Division	45	0	5	0	1	0	51	0
Brentford	1971–72	Fourth Division	37	2	0	0	1	0	38	2
Brentford	1972–73	Third Division	42	0	1	0	2	0	45	0
Brentford	1973–74	Fourth Division	40	0	1	0	1	0	42	0
Brentford	1974–75	Fourth Division	3	0	0	0	1	0	4	0
Career total			471	17	28	0	19	1	516	18

== Honours ==
Brentford

- Football League Fourth Division: 1962–63
- Football League Fourth Division third-place promotion: 1971–72

Individual

- Brentford Supporters' Player of the Year: 1972–73, 1973–74
- Brentford Players' Player of the Year: 1973–74
- Brentford Hall of Fame
