= Paul Bence =

English footballer (1948–2024)

Personal information
- Full name: Paul Ian Bence
- Date of birth: 21 December 1948
- Place of birth: Littlehampton, England
- Date of death: 31 March 2024 (aged 75)
- Positions: Defensive midfielder; right back

Youth career
- Brighton & Hove Albion

Senior career*
Years	Team	Apps	(Gls)
1967–1968	Brighton & Hove Albion	1	(0)
1968–1970	Reading	14	(2)
1970–1977	Brentford	244	(6)
1976–1977	→ Torquay United (loan)	5	(0)
- Wokingham Town

Managerial career
- 1984–1986: Wycombe Wanderers
- * Club domestic league appearances and goals

Paul Ian Bence (21 December 1948 – 31 March 2024) was an English professional footballer who made more than 250 appearances in the Football League playing for Brighton & Hove Albion, Reading, Brentford and Torquay United. He played as a defensive midfielder or as a right back.

== Career ==
Bence was born in Littlehampton, Sussex. He began his career as an apprentice with Brighton & Hove Albion, turning professional in May 1967. He had previously captained Sussex Schools Under-15 side. His league debut (and only league appearance for Brighton) came as a substitute the following season. In June 1968 he left for Reading, but was only to make 14 league appearances, scoring twice, in the next two seasons at Elm Park. In July 1970 Reading released the player and he joined Brentford, where he established himself, making 268 appearances, scoring six goals and winning the club's Players' Player of the Year award in the 1972–73 season. In November 1976, having lost his place at Brentford, he played five league games on loan at Torquay United.

Bence left Brentford in March 1977, subsequently becoming player-coach at Wokingham Town and putting to use the coaching qualifications he had acquired while a professional player. He was later youth coach at Queens Park Rangers and coached at Farnborough Town. In August 1984 he was appointed manager of Wycombe Wanderers, and guided them to promotion to the Alliance Premier League in his first season in charge, but only because the two teams finishing above them failed the ground grading criteria. Wycombe were relegated the next season, though Bence had already left in January 1986 because of increasing work commitments.

== Personal life and death ==
Bence entered the brewing industry in 1977. As of 2011, he was national sales manager for Wadworth Brewery.

On 31 March 2024, it was announced that Bence had died at the age of 75.

== Honours ==
Brentford

- Football League Fourth Division: 1971–72

Individual

- Brentford Hall of Fame
