= John Docherty (footballer, born 1940) =

Scottish footballer and manager (1940–2024)

Personal information
- Date of birth: 29 April 1940
- Place of birth: Glasgow, Scotland
- Date of death: 4 December 2024 (aged 84)
- Position: Right winger

Senior career*
| Years | Team | Apps | (Gls) |
- St Roch's
| 1959–1961 | Brentford | 17 | (2) |
| 1961–1966 | Sheffield United | 41 | (9) |
| 1966–1968 | Brentford | 97 | (31) |
| 1968–1970 | Reading | 46 | (8) |
| 1970–1974 | Brentford | 116 | (33) |
| 1974–1975 | Queens Park Rangers | 0 | (0) |
| Total | | 317 | (116) |

Managerial career
- 1975–1976: Brentford
- 1978–1983: Cambridge United
- 1986–1990: Millwall
- 1990–1991: Bradford City
- 1997: Millwall
- * Club domestic league appearances and goals

John Docherty (29 April 1940 – 4 December 2024) was a Scottish football player and manager.

== Managerial career ==
Having previously been manager of Cambridge United between January 1978 and 13 December 1983 and Brentford, and briefly coaching at St Clement Danes School after leaving Brentford, his spell at Cambridge United saw the club in the Second Division where they managed respectable finishes, with eighth in 1979–80 being their highest. The following season saw the side as outside contenders for promotion before a late slump saw them finish 13th.

He was appointed Millwall manager in May 1986 following the departure of George Graham to Arsenal. In his second season as manager, he guided them to the Second Division title and gained Millwall their first top division campaign.

Docherty's team performed well in the first half of the 1988–89 season, topping the table at one point. Their form in the second half of the season faded, and their position of 10th place in the final table was their lowest standing all season, but still, this remains their highest league finishing position to date.

The 1989–90 season started well for Millwall, and they again briefly topped the league in September, but won only two more league games all season and were relegated in bottom place. Just before relegation was confirmed, Docherty was dismissed in favour of Bruce Rioch in February 1990.

Docherty's next stop was at Bradford City, in March 1990, who were relegated to the Third Division later that season. He was in charge for 20 months before being sacked on 11 November 1991, to make way for Frank Stapleton.

Docherty returned to Millwall during the 1996–97 season, but by this stage they were in the new Division Two (the third flight of English football) and he failed to emulate his first spell as manager. His contract was not renewed at the end of the season and he was replaced by Billy Bonds.

== Personal life and death ==
In retirement, Docherty lived in Wiltshire. He died on 4 December 2024, at the age of 84.

== Honours ==
Brentford

- Football League Fourth Division third-place promotion: 1971–72

Cambridge United

- Football League Third Division runner-up: 1977-78

Millwall

- Football League Second Division: 1987–88

Individual

- Brentford Hall of Fame
- Cambridge United Hall of Fame
