= 1975–76 Brentford F.C. season =

English football team season

Brentford
1975–76 season
- Chairman: Dan Tana
- Manager: John Docherty
- Stadium: Griffin Park
- Fourth Division: 18th
- FA Cup: Third round
- League Cup: Second round
- Top goalscorer: League: Cross (14); All: Cross (16)
- Highest home attendance: 12,452
- Lowest home attendance: 3,453
- Average home league attendance: 5,096
Home colours	Away colours

During the 1975–76 English football season, Brentford competed in the Football League Fourth Division. A poor middle third of the season led to an 18th-place finish, just three points above the re-election zone.

== Season summary ==
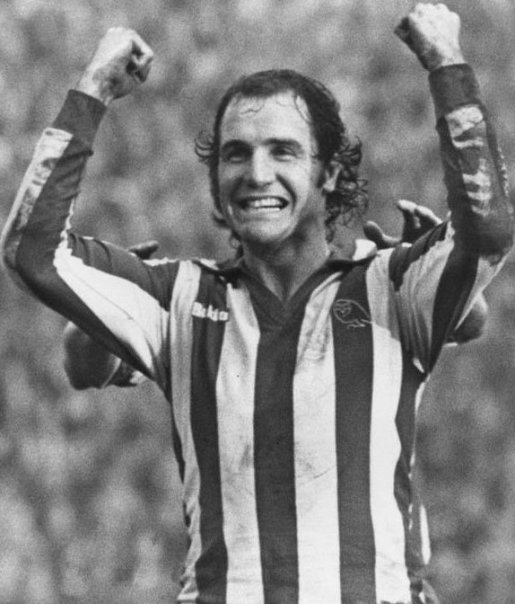
Forward Andrew McCulloch joined Brentford for a club-record £25,000 fee in March 1976.

Despite a strong finish to the previous campaign, only one incoming transfer (veteran goalkeeper Bill Glazier for £4,000) did not raise the belief around Griffin Park that Brentford would challenge for promotion from the Fourth Division during the 1975–76 season. Instead, manager John Docherty made up the numbers with members of the club's youth team, with teenagers Gordon Sweetzer, Danis Salman, Paul Walker and Graham Cox all joining the club.

Brentford had a strong start to the season, winning three and drawing three of the first six league matches of the season and advancing to the second round of the League Cup, where the run was brought to an end at Old Trafford by Manchester United. With goalkeeper Bill Glazier quitting the club after just 12 appearances, Brentford would tread water in the lower reaches of mid-table throughout the season, in which a run to the third round of the FA Cup became the focus. Having reached that stage of the competition for the first time since the 1970–71 season, the Bees took Second Division club Bolton Wanderers to a replay before losing 2–0 at Burnden Park. A slight upturn in form towards the end of the season was inspired by the signing of Oxford United forward Andrew McCulloch for a club record £25,000 fee.

Two club records were set during the season:

- Youngest Football League debutant: Danis Salman, 15 years, 8 months, 3 days (versus Watford, 15 November 1975)
- Lowest away Football League attendance: 894 versus Rochdale, 27 March 1976

== League table ==
Pos	Team	Pld	W	D	L	GF	GA	GAv	Pts
16	Crewe Alexandra	46	13	15	18	58	57	1.018	41
17	Bradford City	46	12	17	17	63	65	0.969	41
18	Brentford	46	14	13	19	56	60	0.933	41
19	Scunthorpe United	46	14	10	22	50	59	0.847	38
20	Darlington	46	14	10	22	48	57	0.842	38

== Results ==
Brentford's goal tally listed first.

=== Legend ===
Win	Draw	Loss

=== Pre-season and friendlies ===
Date	Opponent	Venue	Result	Attendance	Scorer(s)
2 August 1975	Oxford United	H	1–5	1,420	Lawrence
4 August 1975	Walton	A	0–0	n/a	
6 August 1975	Portsmouth	H	0–1	955	
7 August 1975	Hayes	A	2–1	n/a	Graham, Bartlett
9 August 1975	Aldershot	H	1–1	1,490	Cross
11 August 1975	Bexley	A	5–0	n/a	Cross (2), Simmons, French, untraced (og)
29 April 1976	Hillingdon Borough	A	4–2	513	Scales, Lawrence, Sweetzer, Poole
3 May 1976	Hounslow	A	3–1	n/a	Russell, Malcolm, Sweetzer

=== Football League Fourth Division ===
No.	Date	Opponent	Venue	Result	Attendance	Scorer(s)
1	16 August 1975	Bradford City	A	1–1	2,385	Johnson
2	23 August 1975	Hartlepool	H	1–1	4,948	Cross
3	30 August 1975	Torquay United	A	3–2	3,179	Cross, Allen, Graham
4	6 September 1975	Barnsley	H	1–0	5,605	Cross
5	15 September 1975	Doncaster Rovers	A	1–1	6,353	Johnson
6	20 September 1975	Stockport County	H	2–1	6,282	Simmons, Riddick
7	24 September 1975	Bournemouth	A	0–3	4,113	
8	27 September 1975	Huddersfield Town	A	1–2	4,160	Sweetzer
9	4 October 1975	Newport County	H	1–3	5,678	Graham
10	11 October 1975	Lincoln City	A	1–3	6,312	Graham
11	18 October 1975	Southport	H	1–0	4,515	Johnson
12	21 October 1975	Northampton Town	A	1–3	6,225	Scales
13	25 October 1975	Cambridge United	A	1–2	2,596	French
14	1 November 1975	Scunthorpe United	H	5–2	4,227	French, Johnson, Cross (2), Graham
15	3 November 1975	Workington	H	4–0	5,379	French, Sweetzer, Johnson (pen), Cross
16	7 November 1975	Tranmere Rovers	A	1–5	4,326	Cross
17	15 November 1975	Watford	H	1–0	6,934	Scales
18	29 November 1975	Crewe Alexandra	A	0–1	2,248	
19	6 December 1975	Rochdale	H	3–0	4,853	Johnson (pen), Cross, Riddick
20	20 December 1975	Darlington	H	3–0	4,193	Sweetzer (2), Cross
21	26 December 1975	Exeter City	A	0–0	4,912	
22	27 December 1975	Reading	H	2–2	10,612	Johnson, Scales
23	10 January 1976	Torquay United	H	1–1	5,687	Johnson
24	16 January 1976	Stockport County	A	0–2	2,267	
25	24 January 1976	Doncaster Rovers	H	0–1	4,885	
26	31 January 1976	Northampton Town	H	2–1	4,114	Johnson (pen), Cross
27	7 February 1976	Workington	A	1–1	1,231	French
28	14 February 1976	Tranmere Rovers	H	0–1	4,725	
29	21 February 1976	Watford	A	2–3	6,223	Bristow (og), Sweetzer
30	23 February 1976	Bournemouth	H	1–2	4,585	Graham
31	28 February 1976	Cambridge United	H	0–0	4,095	
32	6 March 1976	Scunthorpe United	A	1–2	3,377	Sharp
33	8 March 1976	Newport County	A	0–1	1,150	
34	13 March 1976	Lincoln City	H	1–0	5,386	Cross
35	16 March 1976	Southport	A	0–2	1,506	
36	20 March 1976	Crewe Alexandra	H	0–0	3,851	
37	27 March 1976	Rochdale	A	2–1	894	McCulloch, French
38	29 March 1976	Darlington	A	0–2	1,758	
39	3 April 1976	Bradford City	H	2–2	3,453	McCulloch, Cross
40	5 April 1976	Huddersfield Town	H	0–0	4,413	
41	10 April 1976	Barnsley	A	1–1	3,877	Cross
42	16 April 1976	Swansea City	H	1–0	4,623	Johnson
43	17 April 1976	Exeter City	H	5–1	4,175	Bence, French (2), McCulloch, Cross
44	19 April 1976	Reading	A	0–1	12,972	
45	24 April 1976	Hartlepool	A	0–1	1,276	
46	26 April 1976	Swansea City	A	2–2	1,480	French, Johnson

=== FA Cup ===
Round	Date	Opponent	Venue	Result	Attendance	Scorer(s)
1R	22 November 1975	Northampton Town	H	2–0	6,645	Sweetzer (2)
2R	13 December 1975	Wimbledon	A	2–0	8,375	Johnson (2, 1 pen)
3R	3 January 1976	Bolton Wanderers	H	0–0	12,452	
3R (replay)	6 January 1976	Bolton Wanderers	A	0–2	18,538	

=== Football League Cup ===
Round	Date	Opponent	Venue	Result	Attendance	Scorer(s)
1R (1st leg)	19 August 1975	Brighton & Hove Albion	H	2–1	5,360	Johnson (pen), Cross
1R (2nd leg)	27 August 1975	Brighton & Hove Albion	A	1–1 (won 3–2 on aggregate)	11,016	Cross
2R	10 September 1974	Manchester United	A	1–2	25,286	Lawrence

- Sources: 100 Years of Brentford, The Big Brentford Book of the Seventies, Statto

== Playing squad ==
Players' ages are as of the opening day of the 1975–76 season.

Pos.	Name	Nat.	Date of birth (age)	Signed from	Signed in	Notes
Goalkeepers
GK	Paul Priddy	(England)	11 January 1953 (aged 22)	Walton & Hersham	1975	
Defenders
DF	Michael Allen	(England)	30 March 1949 (aged 26)	Middlesbrough	1971	
DF	Paul Bence (c)	(England)	21 December 1948 (aged 26)	Reading	1970	
DF	Keith Lawrence	(England)	25 March 1954 (aged 21)	Chelsea	1974	
DF	Alan Nelmes	(England)	20 October 1948 (aged 26)	Chelsea	1967	
DF	Gordon Riddick	(England)	6 November 1943 (aged 31)	Northampton Town	1973	
DF	Tom Sharp	(Scotland)	30 July 1957 (aged 18)	Everton	1976	Loaned from Everton before transferring permanently
DF	Nigel Smith	(England)	3 July 1958 (aged 17)	Queens Park Rangers	1975	
Midfielders
MF	Jackie Graham	(Scotland)	16 July 1946 (aged 29)	Guildford City	1970	
MF	Terry Johnson	(England)	30 August 1949 (aged 25)	Southend United	1974	
MF	Danis Salman	(England)	12 March 1960 (aged 15)	Youth	1975	
MF	Terry Scales	(England)	18 January 1951 (aged 24)	West Ham United	1971	
Forwards
FW	Roger Cross	(England)	20 October 1948 (aged 26)	Fulham	1973	
FW	Micky French	(England)	7 May 1955 (aged 20)	Queens Park Rangers	1975	
FW	Andrew McCulloch	(England)	3 January 1950 (aged 25)	Oxford United	1976	
FW	Richard Poole	(England)	3 July 1957 (aged 18)	Youth	1972	
FW	Gordon Sweetzer	(Canada)	27 January 1957 (aged 18)	Queens Park Rangers	1975	
Players who left the club mid-season
GK	Bill Glazier	(England)	2 August 1943 (aged 32)	Coventry City	1975	Released
GK	Graham Horn	(England)	23 August 1954 (aged 20)	Luton Town	1975	Returned to Luton Town after loan
FW	Dave Simmons	(England)	24 October 1948 (aged 26)	Cambridge United	1974	Transferred to Cambridge United

- Sources: The Big Brentford Book of the Seventies, Timeless Bees

== Coaching staff ==
Name	Role
(Scotland) John Docherty	Manager
(England) Eddie Lyons	Trainer
(England) Bob Pearson	Chief Scout

== Statistics ==
=== Appearances and goals ===
Substitute appearances in brackets.

Pos	Nat	Name	League		FA Cup		League Cup		Total	
Pos	Nat	Name	Apps	Goals	Apps	Goals	Apps	Goals	Apps	Goals
GK	(England)	Bill Glazier	19	0	—		3	0	12	0
GK	(England)	Paul Priddy	34	0	4	0	—		38	0
DF	(England)	Michael Allen	45	1	4	0	3	0	52	1
DF	(England)	Paul Bence	46	1	4	0	3	0	53	1
DF	(England)	Keith Lawrence	35	0	4	0	3	1	42	1
DF	(England)	Alan Nelmes	28 (1)	0	3 (1)	0	3	0	34 (2)	0
DF	(England)	Gordon Riddick	23 (3)	2	1 (1)	0	0 (1)	0	24 (5)	2
DF	(Scotland)	Tom Sharp	2 (10)	1	—		—		2 (10)	1
DF	(England)	Nigel Smith	37	0	4	0	3	0	44	0
MF	(Scotland)	Jackie Graham	38	5	4	0	3	0	45	5
MF	(England)	Terry Johnson	46	11	4	2	3	1	53	14
MF	(England)	Danis Salman	3 (3)	0	0	0	0	0	3 (3)	0
MF	(England)	Terry Scales	43	3	4	0	3	0	50	3
FW	(England)	Roger Cross	37	14	3	0	2 (1)	2	42 (1)	16
FW	(England)	Micky French	27 (4)	8	1 (1)	0	2	0	30 (5)	8
FW	(England)	Andrew McCulloch	13	3	—		—		13	3
FW	(England)	Richard Poole	2 (5)	0	0	0	0	0	2 (5)	0
FW	(England)	Dave Simmons	10	1	—		2 (1)	0	12 (1)	1
FW	(Canada)	Gordon Sweetzer	25 (2)	5	4	2	0	0	29 (2)	7
Players loaned in during the season
GK	(England)	Graham Horn	3	0	—		—		3	0

- Players listed in italics left the club mid-season.
- Source: 100 Years of Brentford

=== Goalscorers ===
Pos.	Nat	Player	FL4	FAC	FLC	Total
FW	(England)	Roger Cross	14	0	2	16
MF	(England)	Terry Johnson	11	2	1	14
FW	(England)	Micky French	8	0	0	8
FW	(Canada)	Gordon Sweetzer	5	2	0	7
MF	(Scotland)	Jackie Graham	5	0	0	5
FW	(England)	Andrew McCulloch	3	—	—	3
MF	(England)	Terry Scales	3	0	0	3
DF	(England)	Gordon Riddick	2	0	0	2
DF	(Scotland)	Tom Sharp	1	—	—	1
FW	(England)	Dave Simmons	1	0	—	1
DF	(England)	Michael Allen	1	0	0	1
DF	(England)	Paul Bence	1	0	0	1
DF	(England)	Keith Lawrence	0	0	1	1
Opponents			1	0	0	1
Total			56	4	4	64

- Players listed in italics left the club mid-season.
- Source: 100 Years of Brentford

=== Management ===
Name	Nat	From	To	Record All Comps					Record League				
Name	Nat	From	To	P	W	D	L	W %	P	W	D	L	W %
John Docherty	(Scotland)	16 August 1975	26 April 1976	53	17	15	21	32.08	46	14	13	19	30.43

=== Summary ===
Games played	53 (46 Fourth Division, 4 FA Cup, 3 League Cup)
Games won	17 (14 Fourth Division, 2 FA Cup, 1 League Cup)
Games drawn	15 (13 Fourth Division, 1 FA Cup, 1 League Cup)
Games lost	21 (19 Fourth Division, 1 FA Cup, 1 League Cup)
Goals scored	64 (56 Fourth Division, 4 FA Cup, 4 League Cup)
Goals conceded	67 (60 Fourth Division, 3 FA Cup, 4 League Cup)
Clean sheets	14 (12 Fourth Division, 2 FA Cup, 0 League Cup)
Biggest league win	4–0 versus Workington, 3 November 1975
Worst league defeat	5–1 versus Tranmere Rovers, 7 November 1975
Most appearances	53, Paul Bence, Terry Johnson (46 Fourth Division, 4 FA Cup, 3 League Cup)
Top scorer (league)	14, Roger Cross
Top scorer (all competitions)	16, Roger Cross

== Transfers & loans ==
Players transferred in
Date	Pos.	Name	Previous club	Fee	Ref.
June 1975	GK	(England) Bill Glazier	(England) Coventry City	£4,000	
September 1975	GK	(England) Paul Priddy	(England) Walton & Hersham	n/a	
September 1975	MF	(England) Danis Salman	(England) Queens Park Rangers	n/a	
September 1975	FW	(Canada) Gordon Sweetzer	(England) Queens Park Rangers	Trial	
September 1975	MF	(England) Paul Walker	n/a	n/a	
1975	GK	(England) Graham Cox	n/a	n/a	
January 1976	MF	(England) Larry McGettigan	Unattached	Non-contract	
January 1976	n/a	(Scotland) David Oxley	(Scotland) Dundee	Trial	
March 1976	FW	(England) Andrew McCulloch	(England) Oxford United	£25,000	
March 1976	DF	(Scotland) Tom Sharp	(England) Everton	n/a	
Players loaned in
Date from	Pos.	Name	From	Date to	Ref.
November 1975	GK	(England) Graham Horn	(England) Luton Town	December 1975	
January 1976	DF	(Scotland) Tom Sharp	(England) Everton	March 1976	
Players transferred out
Date	Pos.	Name	Subsequent club	Fee	Ref.
November 1975	FW	(England) Dave Simmons	(England) Cambridge United	Nominal	
Players released
Date	Pos.	Name	Subsequent club	Join date	Ref.
October 1975	GK	(England) Bill Glazier	(United States) St. Louis Stars	1977	
1975	MF	(England) Barry Salvage	(England) Millwall	August 1975	
May 1976	DF	(England) Keith Lawrence	(England) Wealdstone	1976	
May 1976	MF	(England) Larry McGettigan	(England) Emeralds	n/a	
May 1976	DF	(England) Alan Nelmes	(England) Hillingdon Borough	1976	
May 1976	n/a	(Scotland) David Oxley	n/a	n/a	
May 1976	FW	(England) Richard Poole	(England) Watford	July 1976	

== Awards ==
- Supporters' Player of the Year: Michael Allen
- Players' Player of the Year: Michael Allen
