= 1973–74 Brentford F.C. season =

English football team season

Brentford
1973–74 season
- Chairman: Les Davey & Walter Wheatley (until January 1974); Walter Wheatley (January–March 1974)
- Manager: Mike Everitt
- Stadium: Griffin Park
- Fourth Division: 19th
- FA Cup: First round
- League Cup: First round
- Top goalscorer: League: Cross (17); All: Cross (17)
- Highest home attendance: 8,717
- Lowest home attendance: 3,166
- Average home league attendance: 5,063
Home colours	Away colours

During the 1973–74 English football season, Brentford competed in the Football League Fourth Division. A dreadful season, marred by infighting at boardroom level, resulted in a 19th-place finish, Brentford's lowest in the Football League since the 1925–26 season.

== Season summary ==
In the wake of Brentford's relegation straight back to the Fourth Division at the end of the previous season, manager Frank Blunstone, who had come to the end of his contract, left Griffin Park to take over as youth team manager at Manchester United. Despite the relegation, fan support for Blunstone was high and the finger of blame pointed at the board of directors, with one letter to the Middlesex Chronicle summing up the situation that the board's penny-pinching ways since 1967 were "necessary for a couple of years or so, but timidity of this sort prompts me to believe that promotion last year was an unwelcome accident, which has now been rectified". Brentford entered pre-season without a manager and training was taken by full back Alan Hawley and other senior professionals. Eventually former Wimbledon player-manager Mike Everitt was appointed as manager, just seven days before the beginning of the season. Everitt made no signings before the first match of the season and inherited a tiny 14-man squad, with backup goalkeeper Gary Towse being Brentford's only incoming transfer, signed two months earlier.

With Brentford one place above the re-election zone after seven league matches, manager Everitt began recruiting new players, including defender Gordon Riddick for a £4,000 fee and loanees Michael Brown and Hughie Reed. The signings had no immediate impact and Brentford sank to the bottom of the Football League after a 4–1 defeat to Scunthorpe United at the Old Showground. The loss meant that Brentford became the first club to occupy both first and last places in the Football League, having risen to top position during the early months of the 1937–38 season. Behind the scenes, the Brentford board had split into two factions, with one side pushing for a move to a new stadium and the other half wishing to stay at Griffin Park. Joint-chairmen Les Davey and Walter Wheatley were split on the matter and Wheatley became sole chairman of the club in January 1974, though he would be ousted two months later.

With Brentford still struggling on the field, midfielder Stewart Houston was sold to Manchester United in December 1973 for a club-record £55,000 fee, but the money was not immediately reinvested in the squad. The disharmony in the boardroom also spread to the playing squad, with Paul Bence, Alan Nelmes, Jackie Graham, Barry Salvage and Paul Priddy requesting moves away, though ultimately none would depart Griffin Park. A 10-match unbeaten run from mid-February through to early-April 1974 finally assured safety and youth products Richard Poole, Kevin Harding and Roy Cotton were able to be blooded, though none of the trio would make more than a handful of senior appearances for the club. Cambridge United forward Dave Simmonds and Bournemouth defender Jimmy Gabriel were brought in on transfer deadline day. Brentford ended the season in 19th place, the club's lowest finish in the Football League since the 1925–26 season. The average home league attendance of 5,063 was the lowest since the club joined the Football League in 1920.

== League table ==
Pos	Team	Pld	W	D	L	GF	GA	GAv	Pts	Promotion or relegation
17	Mansfield Town	46	13	17	16	62	69	0.899	43	
18	Scunthorpe United	45	14	12	19	47	64	0.734	42 (Note: Scunthorpe United v. Exeter was never played; Exeter failed to turn up and Scunthorpe were awarded the points.)	
19	Brentford	46	12	16	18	48	50	0.960	40	
20	Darlington	46	13	13	20	40	62	0.645	39	
21	Crewe Alexandra	46	14	10	22	43	71	0.606	38	Re-elected

Source: rsssf.com

== Results ==
Brentford's goal tally listed first.

=== Legend ===
Win	Draw	Loss

=== Pre-season and friendlies ===
Date	Opponent	Venue	Result	Attendance	Scorer(s)
11 August 1973	Hereford United	H	2–2	3,330	Webb, Graham
18 August 1973	Aldershot	A	0–1	2,363	
20 August 1973	Luton Town	H	1–1	2,320	Cross
29 October 1973	Ex-Bees XI	H	3–4	1,461	Woon, Salvage, Metchick
6 May 1974	Orient	H	2–2	2,550	O'Mara, Docherty

=== Football League Fourth Division ===
No.	Date	Opponent	Venue	Result	Attendance	Scorer(s)
1	25 August 1973	Hartlepool	A	0–1	3,447	
2	1 September 1973	Exeter City	H	0–1	4,814	
3	8 September 1973	Darlington	A	2–1	2,287	Woon, Cross
4	10 September 1973	Torquay United	H	0–0	5,581	
5	15 September 1973	Doncaster Rovers	H	2–0	4,957	Cross (2)
6	17 September 1973	Reading	H	0–1	8,717	
7	22 September 1973	Bury	A	0–3	4,329	
8	29 September 1973	Barnsley	H	5–1	5,010	Scales, Woon (2), Docherty, Metchick
9	3 October 1973	Reading	A	0–1	11,267	
10	6 October 1973	Lincoln City	A	2–3	4,056	Woon, Cross
11	13 October 1973	Peterborough United	H	0–1	6,141	
12	20 October 1973	Rotherham United	H	1–1	4,419	Webb
13	24 October 1973	Torquay United	A	0–3	4,445	
14	27 October 1973	Scunthorpe United	A	1–4	2,523	Cross
15	3 November 1973	Mansfield Town	H	4–1	4,331	Houston, Cross (3, 1 pen)
16	10 November 1973	Workington	A	2–0	970	Woon, Riddick
17	12 November 1973	Stockport County	A	1–1	1,948	Riddick
18	17 November 1973	Chester	H	3–0	5,166	Cross (3)
19	1 December 1973	Gillingham	H	0–3	5,748	
20	8 December 1973	Bradford City	A	1–1	3,243	Webb
21	15 December 1973	Darlington	H	0–0	3,166	
22	22 December 1973	Barnsley	A	1–2	2,458	Cross
23	26 December 1973	Newport County	H	1–1	5,445	Graham
24	1 January 1974	Exeter City	A	1–2	5,754	Salvage
25	5 January 1974	Swansea City	H	0–2	3,501	
26	12 January 1974	Doncaster Rovers	A	2–1	3,009	Woon (2)
27	19 January 1974	Hartlepool	H	1–2	4,646	Allen
28	26 January 1974	Crewe Alexandra	A	0–0	1,380	
29	2 February 1974	Northampton Town	A	0–0	4,130	
30	9 February 1974	Bury	H	1–2	4,015	Cross
31	16 February 1974	Peterborough United	A	0–1	7,645	
32	23 February 1974	Lincoln City	H	2–1	4,171	Salvage, Cross
33	2 March 1974	Newport County	A	1–1	2,167	Salvage
34	9 March 1974	Scunthorpe United	H	2–1	4,053	Salvage, Allen
35	16 March 1974	Rotherham United	A	1–1	2,536	Metchick
36	18 March 1974	Northampton Town	H	3–1	3,686	Cross, Simmons, Salvage
37	23 March 1974	Workington	H	1–1	5,008	Cross
38	26 March 1974	Swansea City	A	0–0	2,220	
39	30 March 1974	Mansfield Town	A	1–1	1,909	Graham
40	1 April 1974	Crewe Alexandra	H	3–0	5,552	Cross, Metchick, Simmons
41	6 April 1974	Stockport County	H	0–0	5,625	
42	12 April 1974	Colchester United	A	1–2	8,155	Simmons
43	13 April 1974	Chester	A	0–0	2,775	
44	16 April 1974	Colchester United	H	0–0	7,478	
45	20 April 1974	Bradford City	H	2–0	5,224	Simmons, Poole
46	27 April 1974	Gillingham	A	0–1	9,319	

=== FA Cup ===
Round	Date	Opponent	Venue	Result	Attendance	Scorer
1R	24 November 1973	Plymouth Argyle	A	1–2	11,050	Allen

=== Football League Cup ===
Round	Date	Opponent	Venue	Result	Attendance	Scorer
1R	28 August 1973	Orient	H	1–2	6,620	Webb

- Sources: 100 Years of Brentford, The Big Brentford Book of the Seventies, Statto

== Playing squad ==
Players' ages are as of the opening day of the 1973–74 season.

Pos.	Name	Nat.	Date of birth (age)	Signed from	Signed in	Notes
Goalkeepers
GK	Paul Priddy	(England)	11 July 1953 (aged 20)	Maidenhead United	1972	
GK	Steve Sherwood	(England)	10 December 1953 (aged 19)	Chelsea	1973	On loan from Chelsea
Defenders
DF	Michael Allen	(England)	30 March 1949 (aged 24)	Middlesbrough	1971	
DF	Paul Bence	(England)	21 December 1948 (aged 24)	Reading	1970	Loaned to Hillingdon Borough
DF	Jimmy Gabriel	(Scotland)	10 October 1940 (aged 32)	Bournemouth	1974	Coach
DF	Peter Gelson	(England)	18 October 1941 (aged 31)	Youth	1961	
DF	Alan Hawley	(England)	7 June 1946 (aged 27)	Youth	1962	Loaned to Hillingdon Borough and Aldershot
DF	Gordon Riddick (c)	(England)	6 November 1943 (aged 29)	Northampton Town	1973	
DF	Terry Scales	(England)	18 January 1951 (aged 22)	West Ham United	1971	
DF	Gary Smith	(England)	4 November 1955 (aged 17)	Youth	1974	
Midfielders
MF	John Docherty	(Scotland)	29 April 1940 (aged 33)	Reading	1970	Assistant manager
MF	Jackie Graham	(Scotland)	16 July 1946 (aged 27)	Guildford City	1970	
MF	Dave Metchick	(England)	14 August 1943 (aged 30)	Atlanta Apollos	1973	
MF	Alan Nelmes	(England)	20 October 1948 (aged 24)	Chelsea	1967	
MF	Barry Salvage	(England)	21 December 1946 (aged 26)	Queens Park Rangers	1973	
Forwards
FW	Roy Cotton	(England)	14 November 1955 (aged 17)	Youth	1973	
FW	Roger Cross	(England)	20 October 1948 (aged 24)	Fulham	1973	
FW	Kevin Harding	(England)	19 March 1957 (aged 16)	Youth	1974	
FW	Richard Poole	(England)	3 July 1957 (aged 16)	Youth	1974	
FW	Dave Simmons	(England)	24 October 1948 (aged 24)	Cambridge United	1974	
FW	Stan Webb	(England)	6 December 1947 (aged 25)	Carlisle United	1972	
FW	Andy Woon	(England)	26 June 1952 (aged 21)	Bognor Regis Town	1973	
Players who left the club mid-season
GK	Gary Towse	(England)	14 May 1952 (aged 21)	Crystal Palace	1973	Released
DF	Michael Brown	(Wales)	27 September 1951 (aged 21)	Brighton & Hove Albion	1973	Returned to Brighton & Hove Albion after loan
MF	Stewart Houston	(Scotland)	20 August 1949 (aged 24)	Chelsea	1972	Transferred to Manchester United
MF	Hughie Reed	(Scotland)	23 August 1950 (aged 23)	Plymouth Argyle	1973	Returned to Plymouth Argyle after loan

- Sources: The Big Brentford Book of the Seventies, Timeless Bees

== Coaching staff ==
Name	Role
(England) Mike Everitt	Manager
(Scotland) John Docherty	Assistant manager
(Scotland) Jimmy Gabriel	Coach
(England) Jess Willard	Trainer, Chief Scout

== Statistics ==
=== Appearances and goals ===
Substitute appearances in brackets.

Pos	Nat	Name	League		FA Cup		League Cup		Total	
Pos	Nat	Name	Apps	Goals	Apps	Goals	Apps	Goals	Apps	Goals
GK	(England)	Paul Priddy	25	0	1	0	1	0	27	0
GK	(England)	Gary Towse	5	0	0	0	0	0	5	0
DF	(England)	Michael Allen	27 (5)	2	0 (1)	1	1	0	26 (8)	3
DF	(England)	Paul Bence	30	0	0	0	1	0	31	0
DF	(Scotland)	Jimmy Gabriel	9	0	—		—		9	0
DF	(England)	Peter Gelson	40	0	1	0	1	0	42	0
DF	(England)	Alan Hawley	22	0	0	0	1	0	23	0
DF	(England)	Gordon Riddick	26 (1)	2	1	0	—		27 (1)	2
DF	(England)	Terry Scales	33	1	1	0	1	0	35	1
MF	(Scotland)	John Docherty	13 (1)	1	1	0	0	0	14 (1)	1
MF	(Scotland)	Jackie Graham	31	2	1	0	0	0	32	2
MF	(Scotland)	Stewart Houston	23	1	1	0	1	0	25	1
MF	(England)	Dave Metchick	33 (1)	3	1	0	—		34 (1)	3
MF	(England)	Alan Nelmes	33	0	1	0	1	0	35	0
MF	(England)	Barry Salvage	37	5	0	0	1	0	38	5
FW	(England)	Roy Cotton	1 (1)	0	0	0	0	0	1 (1)	0
FW	(England)	Roger Cross	39 (2)	17	1	0	1	0	41 (2)	17
FW	(England)	Kevin Harding	5	0	0	0	0	0	5	0
FW	(England)	Richard Poole	5 (1)	1	0	0	0	0	5 (1)	1
FW	(England)	Dave Simmons	12	4	—		—		12	4
FW	(England)	Stan Webb	13 (2)	2	0	0	1	1	14 (2)	3
FW	(England)	Andy Woon	24 (3)	7	1	0	0 (1)	0	25 (4)	7
Players loaned in during the season
GK	(England)	Steve Sherwood	16	0	—		—		16	0
DF	(Wales)	Michael Brown	3	0	—		—		3	0
MF	(Scotland)	Hughie Reed	3 (1)	0	—		—		3 (1)	0

- Players listed in italics left the club mid-season.
- Source: 100 Years of Brentford

=== Goalscorers ===
Pos.	Nat	Player	FL4	FAC	FLC	Total
FW	(England)	Roger Cross	17	0	0	17
FW	(England)	Andy Woon	7	0	0	7
MF	(England)	Barry Salvage	5	0	0	5
FW	(England)	Dave Simmons	4	—	—	4
MF	(England)	Dave Metchick	3	0	—	3
DF	(England)	Michael Allen	2	1	0	3
FW	(England)	Stan Webb	2	0	1	3
DF	(England)	Gordon Riddick	2	0	—	2
MF	(Scotland)	Jackie Graham	2	0	0	2
MF	(Scotland)	John Docherty	1	0	0	1
MF	(Scotland)	Stewart Houston	1	0	0	1
FW	(England)	Richard Poole	1	0	0	1
DF	(England)	Terry Scales	1	0	0	1
Total			48	1	1	50

- Players listed in italics left the club mid-season.
- Source: 100 Years of Brentford

=== Management ===
Name	Nat	From	To	Record All Comps					Record League				
Name	Nat	From	To	P	W	D	L	W %	P	W	D	L	W %
Mike Everitt	(England)	25 August 1973	27 April 1974	48	12	16	20	25.00	46	12	16	18	26.09

=== Summary ===
Games played	48 (46 Fourth Division, 1 FA Cup, 1 League Cup)
Games won	12 (12 Fourth Division, 0 FA Cup, 0 League Cup)
Games drawn	16 (16 Fourth Division, 0 FA Cup, 0 League Cup)
Games lost	20 (18 Fourth Division, 1 FA Cup, 1 League Cup)
Goals scored	50 (48 Fourth Division, 1 FA Cup, 1 League Cup)
Goals conceded	54 (50 Fourth Division, 2 FA Cup, 2 League Cup)
Clean sheets	13 (13 Fourth Division, 0 FA Cup, 0 League Cup)
Biggest league win	5–1 versus Barnsley, 29 September 1973
Worst league defeat	3–0 on three occasions; 4–1 versus Scunthorpe United, 27 October 1973
Most appearances	43, Roger Cross (41 Fourth Division, 1 FA Cup, 1 League Cup)
Top scorer (league)	17, Roger Cross
Top scorer (all competitions)	17, Roger Cross

== Transfers & loans ==
Players transferred in
Date	Pos.	Name	Previous club	Fee	Ref.
June 1973	GK	(England) Gary Towse	(England) Crystal Palace	Free	
September 1973	MF	(England) Dave Metchick	(United States) Atlanta Apollos	Trial	
October 1973	DF	(England) Gordon Riddick	(England) Northampton Town	£4,000	
March 1974	DF	(Scotland) Jimmy Gabriel	(England) Bournemouth	Free	
March 1974	FW	(England) Dave Simmons	(England) Cambridge United	£12,000	
Players loaned in
Date from	Pos.	Name	From	Date to	Ref.
September 1973	DF	(Wales) Michael Brown	(England) Brighton & Hove Albion	October 1973	
October 1973	MF	(Scotland) Hughie Reed	(England) Plymouth Argyle	November 1973	
January 1974	GK	(England) Steve Sherwood	(England) Chelsea	End of season	
Players transferred out
Date	Pos.	Name	Subsequent club	Fee	Ref.
December 1973	MF	(Scotland) Stewart Houston	(England) Manchester United	£55,000	
1973	MF	(England) David Jenkins	(England) Hereford United	Free	
Players loaned out
Date from	Pos.	Name	To	Date to	Ref.
December 1973	DF	(England) Paul Bence	(England) Hillingdon Borough	December 1973	
February 1974	DF	(England) Alan Hawley	(England) Hillingdon Borough	February 1974	
February 1974	DF	(England) Alan Hawley	(England) Aldershot	March 1974	
Players released
Date	Pos.	Name	Subsequent club	Join date	Ref.
January 1974	GK	(England) Gary Towse	(South Africa) Jewish Guild	1974	
May 1974	FW	(England) Roy Cotton	(England) Orient	July 1974	
May 1974	MF	(Scotland) John Docherty	(England) Queens Park Rangers	July 1974	
May 1974	DF	(Scotland) Jimmy Gabriel	(United States) Seattle Sounders	1974	
May 1974	DF	(England) Alan Hawley	(England) Hillingdon Borough	1974	
May 1974	FW	(England) Stan Webb	(England) Darlington	July 1974	

== Awards ==
- Supporters' Player of the Year: Peter Gelson
- Players' Player of the Year: Peter Gelson
