= 1974–75 Brentford F.C. season =

English football team season

Brentford
1974–75 season
- Chairman: Les Davey (until November 1974); Dan Tana (from November 1974)
- Manager: Mike Everitt (until 16 January 1975); Jess Willard (16–20 January 1975); John Docherty (from 20 January 1975)
- Stadium: Griffin Park
- Fourth Division: 8th
- FA Cup: Second round
- League Cup: Second round
- Top goalscorer: League: Simmons (12); All: Simmons (13)
- Highest home attendance: 6,485
- Lowest home attendance: 3,983
- Average home league attendance: 5,172
Home colours	Away colours

During the 1974–75 English football season, Brentford competed in the Football League Fourth Division. After a poor first half of the season, manager Mike Everitt was sacked and replaced by John Docherty, who produced a strong run of results to finish the campaign in 8th place.

== Season summary ==
Off the back of Brentford's lowest finish in the Football League since the 1925–26 season, only three players were signed – defender Keith Lawrence on a permanent deal from Chelsea, goalkeeper Steve Sherwood on a season-long loan from Chelsea and Wimbledon midfield trialist Graham Smith. Two long-serving players were released, winger John Docherty and full back Alan Hawley. New chairman Les Davey announced that the club would move to a new stadium in West London and that there was talk of a £1,000,000 takeover bid by local firm Brentford Nylons, but nothing came of either plan.

Brentford began the season poorly and after eight league matches were just two points above the Fourth Division re-election zone, though one early season highlight was a League Cup second round tie versus First Division giants Liverpool at Anfield, where Roger Cross scored the opener in a 2–1 defeat. The Liverpool match was also notable for it being the final appearance made by centre half Peter Gelson, then the club's second-highest appearance-maker, who had his contract cancelled and departed the club shortly afterwards. Under recently appointed chairman Dan Tana, manager Mike Everitt was given a vote of confidence in November 1974 and strengthened the team by signing forward Willie Brown on loan from Newport County (and later permanently for £4,000) and midfielder Terry Johnson from Southend United for £15,000.

The signings had the desired effect and Brentford rose into mid-table after winning four and drawing one of a seven-match spell from late November through to mid-January 1975, but on 16 January, manager Mike Everitt was sacked. Trainer Jess Willard took over as caretaker manager for the following match, before the appointment of former player John Docherty on 20 January. Docherty turned Brentford's season around, losing just four of the remaining 19 matches of the season to finish in 8th place. Four wins, two draws and just one defeat in April won Docherty the Football League Manager of the Month award.

== League table ==
Pos	Team	Pld	W	D	L	GF	GA	GAv	Pts
6	Cambridge United	46	20	14	12	62	44	1.409	54
7	Reading	46	21	10	15	63	47	1.340	52
8	Brentford	46	18	13	15	53	45	1.178	49
9	Exeter City	46	19	11	16	60	63	0.952	49
10	Bradford City	46	17	13	16	56	51	1.098	47

Source: rsssf.com

== Results ==
Brentford's goal tally listed first.

=== Legend ===
Win	Draw	Loss

=== Pre-season and friendlies ===
Date	Opponent	Venue	Result	Attendance	Scorer(s)
3 August 1974	Portsmouth	H	0–4	1,790	
6 August 1974	Aldershot	H	1–3	1,440	Simmons
9 August 1974	Millwall	H	2–0	1,190	Woon, untraced (og)
12 August 1974	Stevenage Borough	A	3–0	n/a	Woon, Cross
16 March 1975	Guernsey XI	A	1–0	n/a	Lawrence
28 April 1975	Millwall	H	0–0	2,262	

=== Football League Fourth Division ===
No.	Date	Opponent	Venue	Result	Attendance	Scorer(s)
1	17 August 1974	Northampton Town	H	1–0	5,147	Woon
2	24 August 1974	Southport	A	0–3	1,285	
3	31 August 1974	Swansea City	H	1–0	4,908	Cross
4	7 September 1974	Chester	A	0–2	2,625	
5	14 September 1974	Cambridge United	H	1–0	5,313	Simmons
6	16 September 1974	Rotherham United	H	3–4	5,979	Simmons, Metchick, Bence
7	21 September 1974	Newport County	A	0–1	3,022	
8	23 September 1974	Rochdale	A	0–0	1,587	
9	28 September 1974	Crewe Alexandra	H	1–0	5,442	Simmons
10	30 September 1974	Stockport County	A	1–1	1,982	Woon
11	5 October 1974	Doncaster Rovers	A	1–2	1,692	Simmons
12	12 October 1974	Lincoln City	H	1–1	4,973	Lawrence
13	19 October 1974	Shrewsbury Town	A	0–1	4,099	
14	23 October 1974	Bradford City	A	0–1	2,932	
15	26 October 1974	Torquay United	H	3–1	4,496	Simmons (2), Graham
16	2 November 1974	Barnsley	A	1–1	4,158	Simmons
17	4 November 1974	Bradford City	H	0–0	5,131	
18	9 November 1974	Mansfield Town	H	2–3	5,553	Foster (og), Simmons
19	16 November 1974	Hartlepool	A	2–3	2,864	Simmons, Johnson
20	30 November 1974	Workington	A	1–0	1,325	Brown
21	7 December 1974	Darlington	H	3–0	4,925	Johnson, Brown (2)
22	21 December 1974	Scunthorpe United	H	2–0	4,364	Brown (2)
23	26 December 1974	Cambridge United	A	0–2	3,959	
24	28 December 1974	Exeter City	H	2–0	5,608	Simmons, Johnson
25	4 January 1975	Northampton Town	A	0–0	4,735	
26	11 January 1975	Darlington	A	1–2	2,095	Johnson
27	18 January 1975	Workington	H	2–2	9,983	Brown, Simmons
28	25 January 1975	Reading	H	1–0	6,485	Brown
29	1 February 1975	Mansfield Town	A	1–1	11,362	Graham
30	4 February 1975	Rotherham United	A	0–3	4,541	
31	8 February 1975	Barnsley	H	3–0	5,080	Simmons, French, Brown
32	15 February 1975	Reading	A	0–1	6,013	
33	22 February 1975	Hartlepool	H	1–0	5,516	Johnson
34	28 February 1975	Swansea City	A	1–0	1,706	Brown
35	8 March 1975	Rochdale	H	3–0	4,460	Johnson, Graham, Cross
36	15 March 1975	Crewe Alexandra	A	1–1	2,356	Johnson
37	22 March 1975	Chester	H	1–1	5,827	Cross
38	31 March 1975	Exeter City	A	0–1	3,301	
39	1 April 1975	Newport County	H	0–0	5,569	
40	5 April 1975	Torquay United	A	2–3	2,555	Cross, Scales
41	7 April 1975	Stockport County	H	3–0	4,434	Riddick, French (2)
42	12 April 1975	Doncaster Rovers	H	1–1	5,147	French
43	15 April 1975	Scunthorpe United	A	2–1	1,556	Cross, Johnson
44	19 April 1975	Lincoln City	A	1–1	6,956	Cross
45	21 April 1975	Southport	H	1–0	4,796	Cross
46	26 April 1975	Shrewsbury Town	H	2–1	5,810	Graham, Cross

=== FA Cup ===
Round	Date	Opponent	Venue	Result	Attendance	Scorer(s)	Notes
1R	23 November 1974	Slough Town	A	4–1	3,394	Graham, Simmons, Woon (2)	(Note: Match played at The Sports Ground, Walton-on-Thames.)
2R	14 December 1974	Brighton & Hove Albion	A	0–1	13,287		

=== Football League Cup ===
Round	Date	Opponent	Venue	Result	Attendance	Scorer(s)
1R	21 August 1974	Aldershot	H	3–0	5,702	Cross (pen), Scales, Woon
2R	10 September 1974	Liverpool	A	1–2	21,413	Cross

- Sources: 100 Years of Brentford, The Big Brentford Book of the Seventies, Statto

== Playing squad ==
Players' ages are as of the opening day of the 1974–75 season.

Pos.	Name	Nat.	Date of birth (age)	Signed from	Signed in	Notes
Goalkeepers
GK	Steve Sherwood	(England)	10 December 1953 (aged 20)	Chelsea	1974	On loan from Chelsea
Defenders
DF	Michael Allen	(England)	30 March 1949 (aged 25)	Middlesbrough	1971	
DF	Paul Bence	(England)	21 December 1948 (aged 25)	Reading	1970	
DF	Kevin Harding	(England)	19 March 1957 (aged 17)	Youth	1974	
DF	Keith Lawrence	(England)	25 March 1954 (aged 20)	Chelsea	1974	
DF	Alan Nelmes	(England)	20 October 1948 (aged 25)	Chelsea	1967	
DF	Terry Scales	(England)	18 January 1951 (aged 23)	West Ham United	1971	
DF	Graham Smith	(England)	8 August 1951 (aged 23)	Wimbledon	1974	Loaned to Wimbledon
DF	Nigel Smith	(England)	3 July 1958 (aged 16)	Queens Park Rangers	1975	
Midfielders
MF	Jackie Graham	(Scotland)	16 July 1946 (aged 28)	Guildford City	1970	
MF	Terry Johnson	(England)	30 August 1949 (aged 24)	Southend United	1974	
MF	Dave Metchick	(England)	14 August 1943 (aged 31)	Atlanta Apollos	1973	
MF	Gordon Riddick (c)	(England)	6 November 1943 (aged 30)	Northampton Town	1973	
MF	Barry Salvage	(England)	21 December 1946 (aged 27)	Queens Park Rangers	1973	
Forwards
FW	Roger Cross	(England)	20 October 1948 (aged 25)	Fulham	1973	
FW	Micky French	(England)	7 May 1955 (aged 19)	Queens Park Rangers	1975	Loaned from Queens Park Rangers before transferring permanently
FW	Richard Poole	(England)	3 July 1957 (aged 17)	Youth	1974	
FW	Dave Simmons	(England)	24 October 1948 (aged 25)	Cambridge United	1974	
FW	Billy Stagg	(England)	17 October 1957 (aged 16)	Youth	1974	
Players who left the club mid-season
DF	Peter Gelson	(England)	18 October 1941 (aged 32)	Youth	1961	Released
DF	Gary Smith	(England)	4 November 1955 (aged 18)	Youth	1974	Loaned to Wimbledon, transferred to Wimbledon
MF	Ian Filby	(England)	9 October 1954 (aged 19)	Orient	1974	Returned to Orient after loan
FW	Willie Brown	(Scotland)	5 February 1950 (aged 24)	Newport County	1974	Loaned from Newport County before transferring permanently Transferred to Torquay United
FW	Andy Woon	(England)	26 June 1952 (aged 22)	Bognor Regis Town	1973	Released

- Sources: The Big Brentford Book of the Seventies, Timeless Bees

== Coaching staff ==
=== Mike Everitt (17 August 1974 – 16 January 1975) ===
Name	Role
(England) Mike Everitt	Manager
(England) Jess Willard	Trainer
(England) Alan Humphries	Chief Scout

=== Jess Willard (16 – 20 January 1975) ===
Name	Role
(England) Jess Willard	Caretaker Manager
(England) Alan Humphries	Chief Scout

=== John Docherty (20 January – 26 April 1975) ===
Name	Role
(Scotland) John Docherty	Manager
(England) Eddie Lyons	Trainer
(England) Bob Pearson	Chief Scout

== Statistics ==
=== Appearances and goals ===
Substitute appearances in brackets.

Pos	Nat	Name	League		FA Cup		League Cup		Total	
Pos	Nat	Name	Apps	Goals	Apps	Goals	Apps	Goals	Apps	Goals
DF	(England)	Michael Allen	32	0	1	0	2	0	35	0
DF	(England)	Paul Bence	43	1	2	0	2	0	47	1
DF	(England)	Peter Gelson	3	0	—		1	0	4	0
DF	(England)	Kevin Harding	3	0	0	0	0	0	3	0
DF	(England)	Keith Lawrence	43	1	2	0	2	0	47	1
DF	(England)	Alan Nelmes	10 (3)	0	0	0	0	0	10 (3)	0
DF	(England)	Terry Scales	40	1	2	0	2	1	44	2
DF	(England)	Gary Smith	3	0	0	0	0	0	3	0
DF	(England)	Graham Smith	7	0	0	0	0	0	7	0
DF	(England)	Nigel Smith	2	0	—		—		2	0
MF	(Scotland)	Jackie Graham	43	4	2	1	1	0	46	5
MF	(England)	Terry Johnson	28	8	2	0	—		30	8
MF	(England)	Dave Metchick	24 (3)	1	1	0	2	0	27 (3)	1
MF	(England)	Gordon Riddick	42	1	2	0	2	0	46	1
MF	(England)	Barry Salvage	34	0	2	0	2	0	38	0
FW	(Scotland)	Willie Brown	16	9	1	0	—		17	9
FW	(England)	Roger Cross	25 (2)	8	0	0	2	2	27 (2)	10
FW	(England)	Micky French	14 (1)	4	—		—		14 (1)	4
FW	(England)	Richard Poole	5 (3)	0	0	0	0	0	5 (3)	0
FW	(England)	Dave Simmons	25 (5)	12	1 (1)	1	1	0	27 (6)	13
FW	(England)	Billy Stagg	4	0	0	0	0	0	4	0
FW	(England)	Andy Woon	13 (4)	2	2	2	1 (1)	1	16 (5)	5
Players loaned in during the season
GK	(England)	Steve Sherwood	46	0	2	0	2	0	50	0
MF	(England)	Ian Filby	1 (2)	0	—		—		1 (2)	0

- Players listed in italics left the club mid-season.
- Source: 100 Years of Brentford

=== Goalscorers ===
Pos.	Nat	Player	FL4	FAC	FLC	Total
FW	(England)	Dave Simmons	12	1	0	13
FW	(England)	Roger Cross	8	0	2	10
FW	(Scotland)	Willie Brown	9	0	—	9
MF	(England)	Terry Johnson	8	0	0	8
MF	(Scotland)	Jackie Graham	4	1	0	5
FW	(England)	Andy Woon	2	2	1	5
FW	(England)	Micky French	4	—	—	4
DF	(England)	Terry Scales	1	0	1	2
DF	(England)	Paul Bence	1	0	0	1
DF	(England)	Keith Lawrence	1	0	0	1
MF	(England)	Dave Metchick	1	0	0	1
MF	(England)	Gordon Riddick	1	0	0	1
Opponents			1	0	0	1
Total			53	4	4	61

- Players listed in italics left the club mid-season.
- Source: 100 Years of Brentford

=== Management ===
Name	Nat	From	To	Record All Comps					Record League				
Name	Nat	From	To	P	W	D	L	W %	P	W	D	L	W %
Mike Everitt	(England)	17 August 1974	11 January 1975	30	11	6	13	36.67	26	9	6	11	34.62
Jess Willard (caretaker)	(England)	18 January 1975	18 January 1975	1	0	1	0	0.00	1	0	1	0	0.00
John Docherty	(Scotland)	25 January 1975	26 April 1975	19	9	6	4	47.37	19	9	6	4	47.37

=== Summary ===
Games played	50 (46 Fourth Division, 2 FA Cup, 2 League Cup)
Games won	20 (18 Fourth Division, 1 FA Cup, 1 League Cup)
Games drawn	13 (13 Fourth Division, 0 FA Cup, 0 League Cup)
Games lost	17 (15 Fourth Division, 1 FA Cup, 1 League Cup)
Goals scored	61 (53 Fourth Division, 4 FA Cup, 4 League Cup)
Goals conceded	49 (45 Fourth Division, 2 FA Cup, 2 League Cup)
Clean sheets	20 (19 Fourth Division, 0 FA Cup, 1 League Cup)
Biggest league win	3–0 on four occasions
Worst league defeat	3–0 on two occasions
Most appearances	50, Steve Sherwood (46 Fourth Division, 2 FA Cup, 2 League Cup)
Top scorer (league)	12, Dave Simmons
Top scorer (all competitions)	13, Dave Simmons

== Transfers & loans ==
Players transferred in
Date	Pos.	Name	Previous club	Fee	Ref.
May 1974	DF	(England) Keith Lawrence	(England) Chelsea	Free	
August 1974	MF	(England) Graham Smith	(England) Wimbledon	Trial	
October 1974	GK	(England) Barry Gordine	(England) Southend United	n/a	
November 1974	MF	(England) Terry Johnson	(England) Southend United	£15,000	
December 1974	FW	(Scotland) Willie Brown	(Wales) Newport County	£4,000	
March 1975	FW	(England) Micky French	(England) Queens Park Rangers	£2,000	
April 1975	DF	(England) Nigel Smith	(England) Queens Park Rangers	n/a	
Players loaned in
Date from	Pos.	Name	From	Date to	Ref.
August 1974	GK	(England) Steve Sherwood	(England) Chelsea	End of season	
September 1974	MF	(England) Ian Filby	(England) Leicester City	October 1974	
November 1974	FW	(Scotland) Willie Brown	(Wales) Newport County	December 1974	
February 1975	FW	(England) Micky French	(England) Queens Park Rangers	March 1975	
Players transferred out
Date	Pos.	Name	Subsequent club	Fee	Ref.
March 1975	FW	(Scotland) Willie Brown	(England) Torquay United	£5,000	
Players loaned out
Date from	Pos.	Name	To	Date to	Ref.
February 1975	MF	(England) Graham Smith	(England) Wimbledon	n/a	
April 1975	DF	(England) Gary Smith	(England) Wimbledon	April 1975	
Players released
Date	Pos.	Name	Subsequent club	Join date	Ref.
October 1974	GK	(England) Paul Priddy	(England) Wimbledon	1974	
February 1975	FW	(England) Andy Woon	(England) Maidstone United	1975	
April 1975	DF	(England) Gary Smith	(England) Wimbledon	April 1975	
May 1975	GK	(England) Barry Gordine	Retired		
May 1975	MF	(England) Dave Metchick	(England) Barnet	1975	
May 1975	DF	(England) Kevin Harding	(England) Hayes	1975	
May 1975	MF	(England) Graham Smith	(England) Wimbledon	1975	
May 1975	FW	(England) Billy Stagg	(England) Wealdstone	n/a	

== Awards ==
- Supporters' Player of the Year: Steve Sherwood
- Players' Player of the Year: Jackie Graham
- Football League Manager of the Month: John Docherty (April 1975)
