= Barnhill =

Barnhill may refer to:

== People ==
- Barnhill (surname)

== Places ==
- Barnhill, Cheshire, in Broxton, England
- Barnhill, County Fermanagh, a townland in County Fermanagh, Northern Ireland
- Barnhill, Dundee, Scotland
- Barnhill, Illinois, United States
- Barnhill, Jura, Scotland, a farmhouse on Jura, Scotland, used by George Orwell
- Barnhill, Ohio, United States
- Barnhill, Perth and Kinross, Scotland, an eastern suburb of Perth
- Barnhill railway station, in Glasgow, Scotland
- Barnhill (Brent ward), an electoral ward in London, England

== See also ==
- Barnhill Community High School
