= Wilshaw =

Wilshaw is a surname. Notable people with the surname include:

- Dennis Wilshaw (1926–2004), English footballer
- Edward Wilshaw (1879–1968), British businessman
- Michael Wilshaw (born 1946), Chief Inspector of Schools
- Peter Wilshaw (born 1987), English cricketer

== See also ==
- George Willshaw (1912–1993), English footballer
