= Gordine =

Gordine is a surname. Notable people with the surname include:

- Barry Gordine (born 1948), English footballer
- Dora Gordine (1895–1991), Estonian sculptor
- Régine Gordine (1915–2012), French rally and circuit driver
