= Richard Poole (footballer) =

English footballer

Personal information
- Full name: Richard John Poole
- Date of birth: 3 July 1957 (age 69)
- Place of birth: Heston, England
- Position: Forward

Youth career
- 1969–1974: Brentford

Senior career*
Years	Team	Apps	(Gls)
1974–1976	Brentford	21	(1)
1976–1977	Watford	9	(1)
1977–1978	Sporting Toulon Var	7	(2)
Total		37	(4)
- * Club domestic league appearances and goals

Richard John Poole (born 3 July 1957) is an English former professional footballer who played as a centre forward in the Football League for Brentford and Watford and in France for Sporting Toulon Var.

== Career ==
=== Brentford ===
Along with Kevin Harding, Poole was one of the first players recruited when the Brentford youth team was relaunched in 1972, after joining the club at the age of 12. Poole made his professional debut in a Fourth Division match versus Lincoln City in February 1974, while still an apprentice. At 16 years, 7 months and 20 days old, Poole's league debut was at the time the club's second-youngest. In the final home game of the 1973–74 season, Poole scored one and made another in a 2–0 win against Bradford City on 20 April, a result which saved the Bees from having to apply for re-election. Poole still stands as Brentford's youngest league goalscorer. He signed a professional contract during the 1975 off-season and made seven further appearances for the club, before leaving in July 1976.

=== Watford ===
Poole joined fellow Fourth Division club Watford in July 1976 and made nine appearances and scored one goal during the 1976–77 season.

=== Sporting Toulon Var ===
In 1977, Poole emigrated to France and joined Division 2 Group A club Sporting Toulon Var. He made 8 appearances and scored two goals during the 1977–78 season, before a knee ligament injury brought his career to an end in April 1978. He was a teammate of future France and Ivory Coast internationals Jean Tigana and Jean-Désiré Sikely respectively.

== Career statistics ==
Appearances and goals by club, season and competition
Club	Season	League			National cup		League cup		Total	
Club	Season	Division	Apps	Goals	Apps	Goals	Apps	Goals	Apps	Goals
Brentford	1973–74	Fourth Division	6	1	0	0	0	0	6	1
Brentford	1974–75	Fourth Division	8	0	0	0	0	0	8	0
Brentford	1975–76	Fourth Division	7	0	0	0	0	0	7	0
Brentford	Total		21	1	0	0	0	0	21	1
Watford	1976–77	Fourth Division	7	1	2	0	0	0	9	1
Sporting Toulon Var	1977–78	French Division 2	7	2	1	0	—		8	2
Career total			35	4	3	0	0	0	38	4
