= McGettigan =

McGettigan is an Irish surname found in County Donegal, Republic of Ireland and County Londonderry, Northern Ireland. They were a sept of the Clan Diarmaid of the Cenél nEógain branch of the Northern Uí Néill. Notable people with the surname include:

- Charlie McGettigan (born 1950), Irish singer, winner of Eurovision Song Contest 1994
- Daniel McGettigan (1815–1887), Irish Catholic prelate
- Eoghan McGettigan, Irish Gaelic footballer
- Ian McGettigan, Canadian rock musician
- Larry McGettigan (1952–1994), English footballer
- Leslie McGettigan, Irish Gaelic footballer and brother of Paul
- Paul McGettigan (born 1950s), Irish Gaelic footballer and brother of Leslie
- Roisin McGettigan (born 1980), Irish long-distance runner
