= Lambu =

Lambu may refer to:

- Mr. Lambu, a 1956 Indian Hindi-language film
- Goma Lambu (born 1984), Congolese footballer
- Lambu Nagesh (died 2017), Indian Kannada actor
- Ishant Sharma (born 1988), nicknamed "Lambu", Indian cricketer
- Lambu, a character in the Indian animated TV series Pakdam Pakdai
- Lambu (lit. 'tall'), nickname of Indian film actor Amitabh Bachchan (born 1942)
- Lambudheen,President of Lambu Janata Party (LJP) in India.
- Lamboo Aata, fictional villain played by Ishrat Ali in the 1998 Indian film Gunda
