= Nigel Smith (footballer, born 1958) =

Professional footballer

Personal information
- Full name: Nigel Paul Smith
- Date of birth: 3 January 1958 (age 68)
- Place of birth: Banstead, England
- Position: Central defender

Youth career
- Banstead Athletic
- Queens Park Rangers

Senior career*
Years	Team	Apps	(Gls)
1975–1978	Brentford	85	(0)
1978–1979	Cambridge United	1	(0)
- Woking
- Metropolitan Police
- * Club domestic league appearances and goals

Nigel Paul Smith (born 3 January 1958) is an English former professional footballer who played as a central defender in the Football League for Brentford and Cambridge United.

== Club career ==
=== Early years ===
Smith began his career with hometown club Banstead Athletic, before moving to the reserve team at Second Division club Queens Park Rangers, for which he made 20 appearances.

=== Brentford ===
In March 1975, Smith transferred to Fourth Division club Brentford and was as a regular in the team during the 1975–76 and 1976–77 seasons. After the appointment of Bill Dodgin, Smith fell out of favour and made just a handful of appearances during the 1977–78 promotion-winning season. Smith had his contract cancelled and departed the Bees in October 1978, after making 96 appearances for the club.

=== Cambridge United ===
Smith moved up to the Second Division to sign for Cambridge United in November 1978, but made just one substitute appearance for the club.

=== Non-league football ===
Smith saw out his career with spells at Isthmian League clubs Woking and Metropolitan Police.

== International career ==
During the 1975–76 season, Smith was called up to train with the England U18 squad, but failed to appear in a match. He later represented the England Police team.

== Personal life ==
After retiring from professional football, Smith joined the Metropolitan Police.

== Career statistics ==
Club	Season	League			FA Cup		League Cup		Total	
Club	Season	Division	Apps	Goals	Apps	Goals	Apps	Goals	Apps	Goals
Brentford	1974–75	Fourth Division	2	0	—		—		2	0
Brentford	1975–76	Fourth Division	37	0	4	0	3	0	44	0
Brentford	1976–77	Fourth Division	34	0	0	0	2	0	36	0
Brentford	1977–78	Fourth Division	9	0	0	0	0	0	9	0
Brentford	1978–79	Third Division	3	0	—		0	0	3	0
Career total			85	0	4	0	5	0	94	0
