= Cliff Ette =

English footballer

Clifford Ette
Personal information
- Date of birth: 17 June 1910
- Place of birth: England
- Date of death: 26 July 1995 (aged 85)
- Position: Forward

Senior career*
Years	Team	Apps	(Gls)
- Northampton Nomads
1934	West Ham United	1	(1)
- Southall
- London League Park Royal
1931-32	St Albans City	17	(10)
1932-33	St Albans City	33	(8)
1933-34	St Albans City	8	(0)
- * Club domestic league appearances and goals

Clifford Ette (September 1910 – 1995) was an English footballer who played, as an inside-right, for St Albans City, Northampton Nomads, West Ham United, Southall and London League Park Royal.

== Career ==
Ette started his career with Northampton Nomads before signing for West Ham in 1934. He had signed for West Ham following a personal request by Charlie Paynter to turn out in a match against Preston North End. This game was on 3 February 1934 and although he scored a goal, it turned out to be Ette's only game for The Hammers. Mysteriously he was never picked again but later appeared for Southall and London League Park Royal, and captained the Southall team that defeated Swindon Town 3-1 in the 1935–36 FA Cup First Round.

The onset of arthritis finished his footballing career and left Ette disabled in later life.
