= Hughie Reed =

Scottish footballer (1950–1992)

Personal information
- Full name: Hugh Dennett Reed
- Date of birth: 23 August 1950
- Place of birth: Dumbarton, Scotland
- Date of death: 1 November 1992 (aged 42)
- Place of death: Crewe, England
- Height: 5 ft 4 in (1.63 m)
- Position: Winger

Youth career
- Drumchapel Amateur
- 1967–1968: West Bromwich Albion

Senior career*
Years	Team	Apps	(Gls)
1968–1971	West Bromwich Albion	8	(2)
1971–1974	Plymouth Argyle	56	(9)
1973	→ Brentford (loan)	4	(0)
1974–1976	Crewe Alexandra	47	(9)
1976–1977	Hartlepool United	6	(1)
- Middlewich Athletic
- Stafford Rangers
- Shotton United
- Stafford Rangers
- * Club domestic league appearances and goals

Hugh Dennett Reed (23 August 1950 – 1 November 1992) was a Scottish professional footballer who played in the Football League for Plymouth Argyle, Crewe Alexandra, West Bromwich Albion, Brentford and Hartlepool as a winger.

== Playing career ==
=== West Bromwich Albion ===
Together with his friend Asa Hartford, Reed joined First Division club West Bromwich Albion from Drumchapel Amateur in 1967. He signed a professional contract the following year and made his professional debut in a league match versus Stoke City in November 1968. Opportunities on the wing were few and far between for Reed and he made just 10 appearances and scoring two goals before being released in November 1971.

=== Plymouth Argyle ===
Reed signed for Third Division club Plymouth Argyle for a £12,000 fee in November 1971. He scored eight goals in his first 10 games, but the goals would prove to be his only strikes in 27 appearances during the 1971–72 season. A barren spell in front of goal early in the 1972–73 season saw Reed lose his place in the team and he failed to make an appearance between December 1972 and April 1973. He showed better form during 1973–74, scoring three goals in seven games mid-season, but he was released at the end of the season. Reed made 58 appearances and scored 11 goals for the Pilgrims.

==== Brentford (loan) ====
Reed joined Fourth Division strugglers Brentford on a one-month loan in October 1973. He played in four league defeats for the Bees and along with Billy Stagg, he holds the record of the shortest player to play for the club.

=== Crewe Alexandra ===
Reed signed for Fourth Division club Crewe Alexandra in July 1974. His first season at Gresty Road was the best of his career, when he scored 9 goals in 41 league appearances. Reed only made six league appearances in the 1975–76 season before his release in October 1976. Reed made 47 league appearances and scored 9 goals for the Railwaymen.

=== Hartlepool United ===
After a trial period at Huddersfield Town, Reed had a short stint with Fourth Division club Hartlepool in October and November 1976, for whom he scored one goal in six appearances.

=== Non-League football ===
After departing Hartlepool, Reed ended his career in non-League football with spells at Middlewich Athletic, Stafford Rangers and Shotton United, before retiring in 1982.

== Personal life ==
Reed was the younger brother of former Arbroath and St Mirren forward Ernie Reed. He was educated at St. Patrick's High School in Dumbarton. After his retirement from football, Reed settled in Crewe. He was found dead at his home on 1 November 1992, aged 42.

== Career statistics ==
Appearances and goals by club, season and competition
Club	Season	League			FA Cup		League Cup		Other		Total	
Club	Season	Division	Apps	Goals	Apps	Goals	Apps	Goals	Apps	Goals	Apps	Goals
West Bromwich Albion	1968–69	First Division	2	0	0	0	0	0	—		2	0
West Bromwich Albion	1969–70	First Division	0	0	0	0	0	0	1 (Note: Appearance in Anglo-Italian Cup)	0	1	0
West Bromwich Albion	1970–71	First Division	6	0	0	0	1	0	—		7	0
West Bromwich Albion	Total		8	0	0	0	1	0	1	0	10	0
Plymouth Argyle	1971–72	Third Division	27	6	1	2	0	0	—		28	8
Plymouth Argyle	1972–73	Third Division	13	0	1	0	0	0	—		14	0
Plymouth Argyle	1973–74	Third Division	16	3	0	0	0	0	—		16	3
Plymouth Argyle	Total		56	9	2	2	0	0	—		58	11
Brentford (loan)	1973–74	Fourth Division	4	0	—		—		—		4	0
Hartlepool	1976–77	Fourth Division	6	1	—		—		—		6	1
Career total			74	10	2	2	1	0	1	0	78	12
