= Andy Woon =

English footballer

Personal information
- Full name: Andrew Geoffrey Woon
- Date of birth: 26 June 1952 (age 74)
- Place of birth: Bognor Regis, England
- Position: Forward

Senior career*
| Years | Team | Apps | (Gls) |
| 1970–1973 | Bognor Regis Town | | |
| 1973–1975 | Brentford | 50 | (12) |
| 1975–1976 | Maidstone United | | |
| 1976–1979 | Gravesend & Northfleet | | (32) |
- Hastings United
- * Club domestic league appearances and goals

Andrew Geoffrey Woon (born 26 June 1952) is an English retired professional footballer who made 50 appearances in the Football League for Brentford as a forward. He later played non-League football for Maidstone United, Gravesend & Northfleet and Hastings United before injuries ended his career.

== Career ==
=== Bognor Regis Town ===
Woon began his career with hometown non-League club Bognor Regis Town and top-scored in consecutive seasons to send the club to two successive promotions out of the Sussex League and into the Southern League First Division South. He departed Nyewood Lane in February 1973.

=== Brentford ===
Woon joined with Third Division strugglers Brentford on trial in October 1972 and impressed enough to sign a professional contract for a £1,000 fee in February 1973. He had a whirlwind start to life at Griffin Park, when he became the only Brentford player to score a hat-trick on his debut in a 5–0 win over Port Vale on 10 February. He was the club's second-leading scorer during the 1973–74 season, before falling out of favour with incoming manager John Docherty in 1975 and departing the club at the end of the 1974–75 season.

=== Non-League football ===
After his departure from Brentford, Woon played on in non-League football with Southern League clubs Maidstone United, Gravesend & Northfleet and Hastings United. Injuries ended his career at the latter club.

== Personal life ==
Woon worked for Jako.

== Career statistics ==
Appearances and goals by club, season and competition
| Club | Season | League | | | FA Cup | | League Cup | | Total | |
| Club | Season | Division | Apps | Goals | Apps | Goals | Apps | Goals | Apps | Goals |
|---|---|---|---|---|---|---|---|---|---|---|
| Brentford | 1972–73 | Third Division | 6 | 3 | — | | — | | 6 | 3 |
| Brentford | 1973–74 | Fourth Division | 27 | 7 | 1 | 0 | 1 | 0 | 29 | 7 |
| Brentford | 1974–75 | Fourth Division | 17 | 2 | 2 | 2 | 2 | 1 | 21 | 5 |
| Career total | | | 50 | 12 | 3 | 2 | 3 | 1 | 56 | 15 |

== Honours ==
Bognor Regis Town

- Sussex League First Division: 1971–72
- Sussex League Second Division: 1970–71
