= Alfred Hawkins (footballer) =

English footballer (1904–??)

Personal information
- Date of birth: 1904
- Place of birth: Malden, England
- Position: Forward

Senior career*
Years	Team	Apps	(Gls)
?–1925	Southall		
1925–1927	Crystal Palace	20	(8)
- * Club domestic league appearances and goals

Alfred T. Hawkins (born 1904, date of death unknown) was a professional footballer who played in the Football League as a forward for Crystal Palace. He also played non-league football for Southall F.C.

== Playing career ==
Hawkins began his career with Southall, then playing in the Athenian League and in November 1925, signed for Crystal Palace of the Football League Third Division South. He made his debut in a home 0–2 defeat to Gillingham and went on to make 19 league appearances in 1925–26, scoring seven times. In January 1926, Hawkins played in a home FA Cup tie against Chelsea scoring once in a 2–1 win. However, he made only one appearance in 1926–27 (one goal) and at the end of the season, left the club.
