= Ross Embleton =

English footballer and coach

Personal information
- Date of birth: 9 November 1981 (age 44)

Senior career*
| Years | Team | Apps | (Gls) |
- Southall
| 2016–2017 | Bedford | 2 | (0) |

Managerial career
- 2017: Leyton Orient (interim head coach)
- 2019: Leyton Orient (interim head coach)
- 2019–2020: Leyton Orient (interim head coach)
- 2020–2021: Leyton Orient
- 2023: Colchester United (caretaker)
- * Club domestic league appearances and goals

Ross Embleton (born 9 November 1981) is an English football coach and former player who is Academy Head of Recruitment for West Ham United.

== Playing career ==
During the 2010–11 season, Embleton played for Southall in the Middlesex County League. Embleton played four games in all competitions for Bedford during the 2016–17 season.

== Coaching career ==
Embleton worked as youth development manager at Leyton Orient, in the academy at Tottenham Hotspur, at A.F.C. Bournemouth and Norwich City, and as a first-team coach at Swindon Town. He then returned to Leyton Orient to work as assistant manager in 2017, and had a short stint as interim head coach in November 2017 alongside Dean Brill. In April 2019 he was charged by the Football Association with misconduct on the basis that his "language and/or behaviour towards a match official was abusive and/or insulting and/or improper".

In June 2019 he became interim head coach of Leyton Orient following the death of Justin Edinburgh. In September 2019 it was announced that Embleton would step down from his role after a permanent manager was appointed, which was expected to be "in the coming weeks", and would take up his old role as assistant head coach. On 17 October 2019 Leyton Orient announced the appointment of Carl Fletcher as head coach, with Embleton's last game in charge being the game on 19 October away to Grimsby Town, before he became assistant head coach under Fletcher. That match ended with a 4–0 victory to Leyton Orient. Fletcher was sacked on 14 November 2019, after failing to win a game during his 29 days in charge, and Embleton returned as interim head coach.

On 23 November 2019 he was sent off for throwing chewing gum at Forest Green Rovers manager Mark Cooper, with Embleton later saying that Cooper made a comment about Justin Edinburgh. Cooper denied the allegations, and the Football Association decided not to investigate the matter further.

On 7 January 2020, Leyton Orient announced that Embleton had been appointed head coach on a 12 month rolling contract. He was sacked on 27 February 2021 following a poor run of results.

In June 2022 he was appointed Head of Recruitment at Colchester United. He became caretaker manager in February 2023. He departed the club in February 2024, and became Academy Head of Recruitment for West Ham United.

== Personal life ==
Embleton's father, Steve, has held coaching roles at Leyton Orient.
