= Barnhill (surname) =

Barnhill is a surname of Scottish origin.

== People with the surname include ==
- Dave Barnhill (1913–1983), US athlete in baseball
- David Barnhill (b. 1969), Australian athlete in rugby
- Herb Barnhill (1913-?), US athlete in baseball
- Hettie Vyrine Barnhill (fl. 2000s-present), US dancer, choreographer
- James Barnhill (referee) (1921–1966), US sports figure
- Joe Barnhill (b. 1965), US singer, songwriter
- John Barnhill (American football) (1903–1973), US college football coach
- John Barnhill (basketball) (1938–2013), US athlete in basketball
- John Barnhill (politician) (1905–1971), Northern Ireland political figure
- M. V. Barnhill (1887–1963), US attorney, judge
- Margaret Barnhill (1799–1861), grandmother of US President Theodore Roosevelt
- Norton Barnhill (1953–2025), US athlete in basketball
- Ruby Barnhill (b. 2004), English actress
- William A. Barnhill (1889–1987), US photographer
