= Gordon Riddick =

English footballer (1943–2018)

Personal information
- Full name: Gordon George Riddick
- Date of birth: 6 November 1943
- Place of birth: Langleybury, England
- Date of death: 24 August 2018 (aged 74)
- Place of death: Langleybury, England
- Positions: Midfielder; defender

Youth career
- 1960–1962: Luton Town

Senior career*
Years	Team	Apps	(Gls)
1962–1967	Luton Town	102	(16)
1967–1969	Gillingham	114	(24)
1969–1970	Charlton Athletic	29	(5)
1970–1972	Orient	21	(3)
1972–1973	Northampton Town	28	(3)
1973–1976	Brentford	95	(3)
1976–1977	Brentford	15	(0)
1977	Wealdstone		
- * Club domestic league appearances and goals

Gordon George Riddick (6 November 1943 – 24 August 2018) was an English professional footballer who made over 400 appearances as a midfielder in the Football League for Gillingham, Brentford, Luton Town, Charlton Athletic, Northampton Town and Orient. While with Brentford, a persistent ankle injury forced Riddick to retire from football in September 1976, but he re-joined the club on a non-contract basis the following month and made 17 further appearances before leaving again in February 1977. In addition to football, Riddick played Minor Counties Championship cricket for Hertfordshire. He served Langleybury Cricket Club as captain, groundsman, committee member and president.

== Career statistics ==
Appearances and goals by club, season and competition
Club	Season	League			FA Cup		League Cup		Total	
Club	Season	Division	Apps	Goals	Apps	Goals	Apps	Goals	Apps	Goals
Luton Town	1962–63	Second Division	3	0	1	0	0	0	4	0
Luton Town	1963–64	Third Division	11	1	0	0	1	0	12	1
Luton Town	1964–65	Third Division	28	5	3	1	1	0	32	6
Luton Town	1965–66	Fourth Division	29	6	0	0	1	0	30	6
Luton Town	1966–67	Fourth Division	31	4	3	0	2	0	36	4
Luton Town	Total		102	16	7	1	5	0	114	17
Gillingham	1966–67	Third Division	13	3	—		—		13	3
Gillingham	1967–68	Third Division	44	8	1	0	3	1	48	9
Gillingham	1968–69	Third Division	41	10	3	2	2	0	46	12
Gillingham	1969–70	Third Division	16	3	0	0	2	0	18	3
Gillingham	Total		114	24	4	2	7	1	125	27
Brentford	1973–74	Fourth Division	27	2	1	0	—		28	2
Brentford	1974–75	Fourth Division	42	1	2	0	2	0	46	1
Brentford	1975–76	Fourth Division	26	2	2	0	1	0	29	2
Brentford	1976–77	Fourth Division	15	0	2	0	0	0	17	0
Brentford	Total		110	5	7	0	3	0	120	5
Career total			326	45	18	3	15	1	359	49
