= Ted Bennett (footballer) =

English footballer (1925–2018)

Personal information
- Full name: Edward Ernest Bennett
- Date of birth: 22 August 1925
- Place of birth: Kilburn, London, England
- Date of death: 23 August 2018 (aged 93)
- Position: Goalkeeper

Youth career
- 1945: Willesden

Senior career*
Years	Team	Apps	(Gls)
1947–1949	QPR	2	(0)
1949–1953	Southall		(2)
1953–1956	Watford	81	(0)
1956–1957	Gravesend & Northfleet	10	(0)

International career
1952–1953	England amateur	11	(0)
1952	Great Britain	1	(0)
- * Club domestic league appearances and goals

Edward Ernest Bennett (22 August 1925 – 23 August 2018) was an English footballer who played as a goalkeeper. He competed for Great Britain at the 1952 Summer Olympics.

== Career ==
Born in Kilburn, Middlesex, Bennett started playing competitive football as an amateur for Southall, who competed in the Athenian League. He joined Football League side QPR in 1949, and made two first team appearances. In a league where most players were professional, Bennett remained an amateur. This enabled him to play eleven times for England at amateur level, and to keep goal for Great Britain at the 1952 Summer Olympics in Helsinki. Great Britain were eliminated 5–3 in the preliminary round by Luxembourg after extra time, in a match that finished 1–1 after 90 minutes.

After a brief return to Southall, Bennett signed on professional terms for Watford in December 1953. He replaced Dave Underwood, who had been sold to Liverpool for £5,000 earlier that month. At the time, this was the highest transfer fee Watford had ever received. Bennett played 86 of Watford's next 87 games, before a finger injury ended his Football League career in 1955. He was sold to Gravesend and Northfleet of the Southern Football League in September 1956 for a nominal transfer fee.
