= Graham Smith (footballer, born 1951) =

English footballer

Personal information
- Full name: Graham Smith
- Date of birth: 8 August 1951 (age 75)
- Place of birth: Wimbledon, England
- Positions: Midfielder; forward

Senior career*
Years	Team	Apps	(Gls)
1971–1972	Wimbledon	2	
1972	Croydon Amateurs		
1972–1974	Wimbledon		
1974–1975	Brentford	7	(0)
1975	→ Wimbledon (loan)		
1975	Wimbledon	1	(0)
1975–1978	Hillingdon Borough	124	(116)
- Dulwich Hamlet
- * Club domestic league appearances and goals

Graham Smith (born 8 August 1951) is an English retired professional football midfielder and forward who appeared in the Football League for Brentford.

== Career statistics ==
Club	Season	League			FA Cup		League Cup		Total	
Club	Season	Division	Apps	Goals	Apps	Goals	Apps	Goals	Apps	Goals
Brentford	1974–75	Fourth Division	7	0	0	0	0	0	7	0
Career total			7	0	0	0	0	0	7	0
