= Sam Turner (footballer, born 1980) =

Welsh footballer

Personal information
- Full name: John Samuel Turner
- Date of birth: 9 September 1980 (age 46)
- Place of birth: Pontypool, Wales
- Position: Goalkeeper

Senior career*
Years	Team	Apps	(Gls)
1998–2000	Charlton Athletic	0	(0)
2000–2002	Stockport County	6	(0)
2002–2003	Southall	?	(?)
- * Club domestic league appearances and goals

John Samuel Turner (born 9 September 1980) is a Welsh former professional footballer who played in the Football League, as a goalkeeper.
