= Gary Towse =

English footballer

Personal information
- Full name: Gary Thomas Towse
- Date of birth: 14 May 1952 (age 74)
- Place of birth: Dover, England
- Positions: Goalkeeper; utility player

Youth career
- Folkestone

Senior career*
Years	Team	Apps	(Gls)
–1972	Folkestone	48	(3)
1972–1973	Crystal Palace	0	(0)
1973	Brentford	5	(0)
- Jewish Guild
1978–1980	Hythe Town		(6)
- Folkestone
- Folkestone Invicta

Managerial career
- Folkestone Invicta (reserves)
- * Club domestic league appearances and goals

Gary Thomas Towse (born 14 May 1952) is an English retired professional footballer who played in the Football League for Brentford as a goalkeeper. He has had a long association with football in Folkestone after becoming a ballboy for his father's club Folkestone in 1958. He later played for the club as a goalkeeper and as an outfield player. He also served successor club Folkestone Invicta in a variety of roles, including goalkeeper, goalkeeping coach, groundsman and manager of the youth and reserve teams.

== Personal life ==
Towse worked for the police in Folkestone Harbour.

== Career statistics ==
Appearances and goals by club, season and competition
Club	Season	League			FA Cup		League Cup		Total	
Club	Season	Division	Apps	Goals	Apps	Goals	Apps	Goals	Apps	Goals
Brentford	1973–74	Fourth Division	5	0	0	0	0	0	5	0
Career total			5	0	0	0	0	0	5	0
