= Michael Brown (footballer, born 1951) =

Welsh footballer

Personal information
- Full name: Michael John Leslie Brown
- Date of birth: 27 September 1951 (age 75)
- Place of birth: Swansea, Wales
- Position: Centre back

Youth career
- 1969–1972: Crystal Palace

Senior career*
Years	Team	Apps	(Gls)
1972–1973	Crystal Palace	0	(0)
1973–1974	Brighton & Hove Albion	8	(1)
1973	→ Brentford (loan)	3	(0)
- Highlands Park

International career
- Wales Schoolboys
- * Club domestic league appearances and goals

Michael John Leslie Brown (born 27 September 1951) is a Welsh retired professional football centre back who played in the Football League for Brighton & Hove Albion and Brentford.

== Career statistics ==
Club	Season	League			FA Cup		League Cup		Total	
Club	Season	Division	Apps	Goals	Apps	Goals	Apps	Goals	Apps	Goals
Brentford (loan)	1973–74	Fourth Division	3	0	—		—		3	0
Career total			3	0	0	0	0	0	3	0
