= Billy Stagg =

English footballer

Personal information
- Full name: William Stagg
- Date of birth: 17 October 1957 (age 69)
- Place of birth: Ealing, England
- Height: 5 ft 4 in (1.63 m)
- Position: Left winger

Youth career
- 1972–1974: Brentford

Senior career*
Years	Team	Apps	(Gls)
1974–1975	Brentford	4	(0)
1976–1977	Wealdstone		
1977	Aylesbury United	14	(1)
1977	Hazells		
1977–1978	Tonbridge Angels		
1979	Pennsylvania Stoners		
1980	GAIS	2	(1)
1980–1981	Northwood	1	(0)
1982–1983	Hendon	16	(3)
1984–1985	Northwood	18	(8)
1986–1987	Northwood	23	(6)
1987	Wealdstone		
1990	St Albans City	1	(0)
- * Club domestic league appearances and goals

William Stagg (born 17 October 1957) is an English retired footballer who played as a left winger in the Football League for Brentford. He also played in Sweden and the United States. Stagg's 5 ft 4 in (1.63 m) height ties him with Hughie Reed for the record of shortest Brentford player.

== Career ==
A graduate of the Brentford youth team, Stagg made four appearances for the club during the 1974–75 Fourth Division season at the age of 16 and dropped into non-League football upon his release at the end of the campaign. Between 1975 and 1990 he played for Wealdstone (two spells), Staines Town, Aylesbury United, Hazells, Tonbridge Angels, Northwood (three spells), Hendon and St Albans City. He also had short spells with American Soccer League and Swedish Division 2 clubs Pennsylvania Stoners and GAIS respectively.

== Career statistics ==
Appearances and goals by club, season and competition
Club	Season	League			National Cup		League Cup		Other		Total	
Club	Season	Division	Apps	Goals	Apps	Goals	Apps	Goals	Apps	Goals	Apps	Goals
Brentford	1974–75	Fourth Division	4	0	0	0	0	0	—		4	0
Aylesbury United	1976–77	Southern League First Division South	11	1	—		—		—		11	1
Aylesbury United	1977–78	Southern League First Division South	3	0	—		—		3 (Note: Appearances in Southern League Cup)	0	6	0
Aylesbury United	Total		14	1	0	0	—		3	0	17	1
GAIS	1980	Swedish Division 2	2	1	0	0	—		—		2	1
Northwood	1980–81	Hellenic League Premier Division	1	0	—		—		—		1	0
Hendon	1982–83	Isthmian League Premier Division	16	3	0	0	—		—		16	3
St Albans City	1989–90	Isthmian League Premier Division	2	0	—		—		—		2	0
Career total			39	5	0	0	0	0	3	0	42	5
