= Gary Smith (footballer, born 1955) =

English footballer

Personal information
- Full name: Gary Michael Smith
- Date of birth: 4 November 1955 (age 70)
- Place of birth: Greenford, England
- Position: Central defender

Youth career
- Watford
- –1973: Brentford

Senior career*
Years	Team	Apps	(Gls)
1973–1975	Brentford	3	(0)
1975	→ Wimbledon (loan)		
1975	Wimbledon	6	(0)
- Southall
	Clacton	2	(0)
- Wivenhoe Town
–1981	Hayes		
- * Club domestic league appearances and goals

Gary Michael Smith (born 4 November 1955) is an English former professional footballer who played in the Football League as a defender.

== Personal life ==
Smith attended Barnhill Community High School. He worked as an insurance salesman and later moved to the US.

== Career statistics ==
Appearances and goals by club, season and competition
Club	Season	League			FA Cup		League Cup		Total	
Club	Season	Division	Apps	Goals	Apps	Goals	Apps	Goals	Apps	Goals
Brentford	1974–75	Fourth Division	3	0	0	0	0	0	3	0
Career total			3	0	0	0	0	0	3	0
