= Southall F.C. =

Association football club in England

Coordinates: 51°32′20″N 0°21′17″W

- Full name: Southall Football Club
- Founded: 1871
- Ground: Honeycroft, Yiewsley
- Capacity: 3,770
- Owner: Stephen Harrison
- Chairman: Sanjeev Sharma
- Manager: Max Howell
- League: Isthmian League South Central Division
- 2025–26: Isthmian League South Central Division, 6th of 22
- Website: http://www.southallfc.com/
Home colours	Away colours

Southall Football Club is a football club representing Southall in the London Borough of Ealing, England. The club is affiliated to the Middlesex County Football Association. They are currently members of the Isthmian League South Central Division and play their home matches at Honeycroft, the home of Uxbridge FC, in Yiewsley.

== History ==
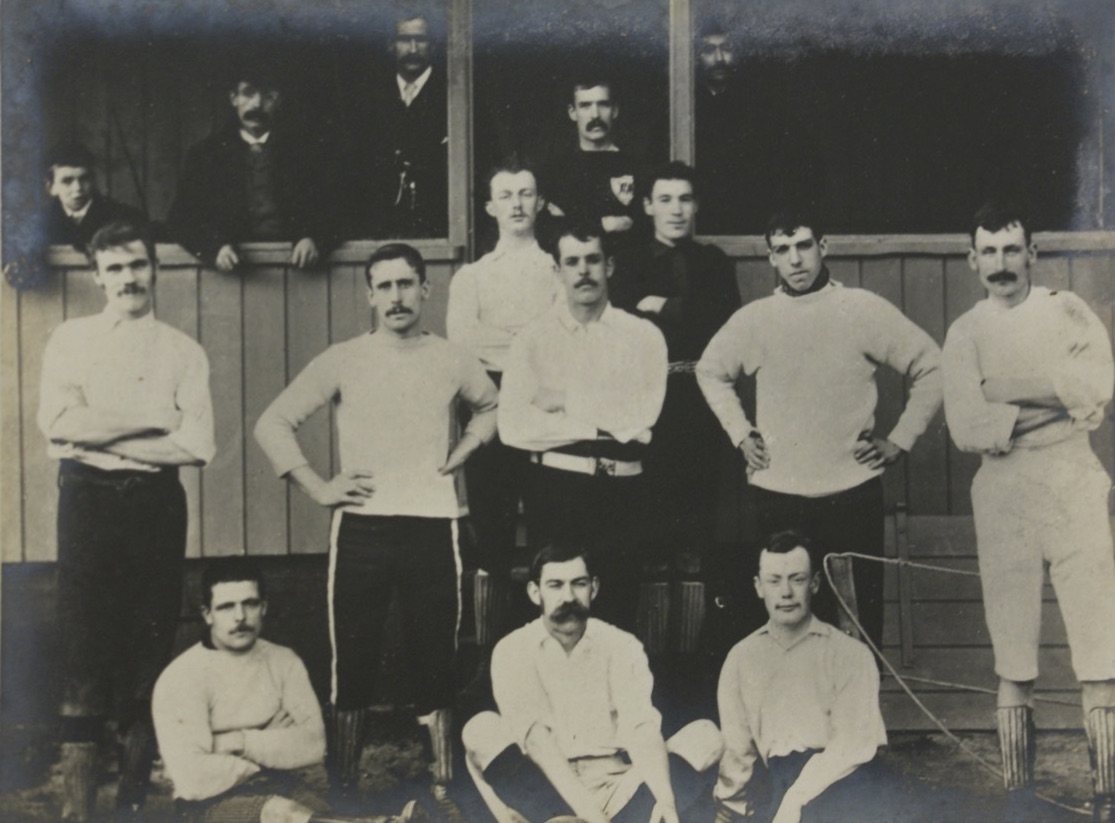
Southall FC 1883–84 season team Top: H. Craddock. Second row: W. Hanson, G. Norton. Third row: W. Strickland, J. Hampton, W. Clements, W. Jelliman, J. Nicholas. Bottom: G. Dixon, J. Saunders, H. Hanson.

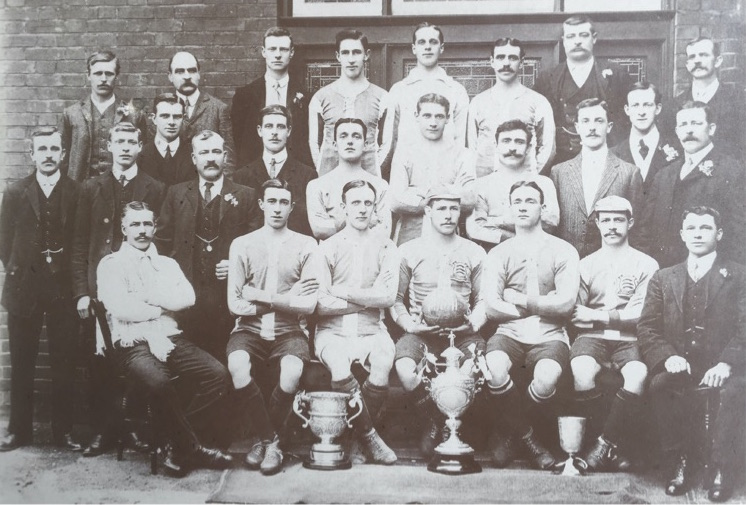
Southall FC 1910–11 season. Charles Roach, who still holds the record for most goals in a season for Southall, is pictured on the bottom row, third from the right.

Southall FC was founded in 1871, making it one of England's oldest football clubs. Their first recorded game was against Uxbridge played at Southall Park on 21 October 1871. Two seasons later they entered the FA Cup.

After playing friendlies and cup competitions they joined the West London League as founder members in 1892, but only stayed for a single season. Four seasons later the club joined Division Two of the Southern Football League in 1896.

The 1904–05 season saw the club attempt to go professional, but this left them with massive debts and they dropped out of the league at the end of the season, and also stopped playing in competitions the following season. Returning to amateur status, Southall merged with another club, Southall Athletic, and moved to a new ground at Western Road. In 1907 the club entered the Great Western Suburban League, where they remained until the First World War.

After the First World War, Southall joined the Athenian League for the 1919–20 season. They stayed in The Athenian League until 1972–73, during which time they won the league once in 1926–27, two seasons after reaching the FA Amateur Cup final. Southall reached the FA Cup third round in 1935–36, beating Swindon 3–1 in the first round and Newport (IOW) 8–0 in the second round, before losing to Watford.

Southall became founding members of the Isthmian League Second Division for the start of the 1973–74 campaign. They finished as runners up in their second season in the Isthmian League and gained promotion to the league's top division. The club then changed its name to Southall & Ealing Borough.

They spent three seasons in the top division before suffering two relegations in a row and finishing in the bottom division of the Isthmian league, after which the club changed its name back to Southall. The club stayed in the bottom division until the end of the 1984–85 season.

They reached another FA final in 1986 when they lost to Halesowen Town in the FA Vase final at Wembley Stadium. When the league reorganised for the 1991–92 season the club was moved up to the new Division Two. They played for two seasons in the higher division before being relegated back to the bottom division of the league.

In 1992, the club lost the use of its Western Road ground and was forced to start ground sharing with other clubs. They remained in the lowest division of the Isthmian League until the end of the 1999–2000 season when, after finishing bottom of the table, they were relegated to the Combined Counties Football League.

Southall remained in the Combined Counties League until March 2006, when they were expelled and their records for the 2005–06 campaign expunged due to financial irregularities. However, the club was able to clear its debts and continued to operate, restarting two levels lower in the Middlesex County Football League Premier Division, from the 2006–07 season. After the division was cut from 15 to 11 teams, Southall were put in Division One Central and East. They finished runners up and immediately jumped back up to the Premier Division.

The 2011–12 season saw manager Steve Embleton guide the club to a third-place finish, securing promotion to the Spartan South Midlands Football League Division One.

With new manager Paul Palmer in charge for 2016–17, Southall reached the quarter-finals of the FA Vase, then the 2017–18 season saw the club crowned Division One champions, Southall's first league title for 91 years. They finished the season with 94 points, with 116 goals scored and a +80 goal difference. The team also broke the club record for most wins at the start of a season (7).

For 2018–19, the club were members of the Combined Counties League Premier Division and, under the management of Max Howell, finished fourth.

The 2019–20 Combined Counties League Premier Division season was abandoned as a result of the COVID-19 pandemic. The pandemic led to further disruption the following season, with Southall's 2020–21 campaign starting in September, before being suspended in December with Southall in fifth place in the table.

The club celebrated its 150th anniversary in 2021 and gained promotion to Step 4 by finishing runners-up in the Combined Counties Premier Division North. From 2022 the club play in the Isthmian League South Central Division and reached the playoffs in 2024.

== Ground ==
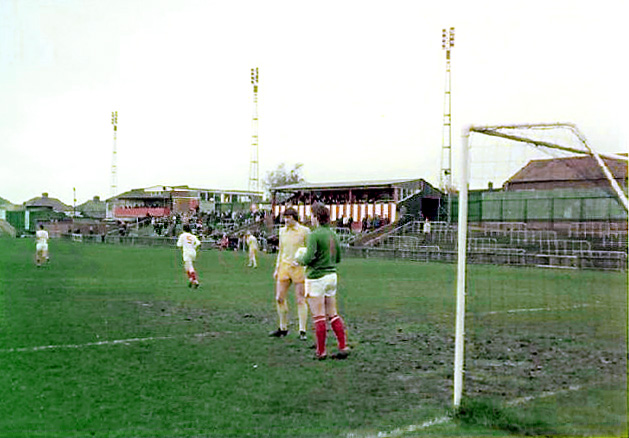
Southall's Western Road ground

In the 2025–26 season, Southall FC played their home games at Hayes & Yeading United's SKYex Community Stadium in Beaconsfield Road, Hayes. In March 2026, they announced a new groundshare agreement with Uxbridge FC to play at Honeycroft for the 2026–27 season.

Up to and including the 2024–25 season, Southall FC played their home games at The 1878 Stadium in Burnham, groundsharing with Burnham FC for a second time, having previously played their home fixtures at Burnham and then at the Robert Parker Stadium in Stanwell, groundsharing with Ashford Town (Middlesex).

Southall have shared grounds with other clubs since having to move from their Western Road stadium in 1992, including Hanwell Town, Chalfont St Peter and Yeading. They were playing their home games at Burnham when they secured their first league title since 1927 in the 2017–18 season. They have plans to return to Southall and are reported to be in discussions with Ealing Council and private landowners about building a new stadium.

The club is proposing a community health and wellbeing centre, to be incorporated into the new stadium as a hub for sports projects and educational use. The new community stadium would offer local residents training and fitness equipment, health checks, sports injury prevention advice, martial arts and boxing coaching sessions. Across the community classes are proposed that will suit the elderly, disabled, youth and other local community groups, and will include female only classes.

== In the media ==
Ahead of Southall's 1986 FA Vase final against Halesowen Town, Thames News televised a preview for the final, interviewing the team's manager Gordon Bartlett at the club's Western Road ground. The piece shows footage of former Southall players Alan Devonshire and Les Ferdinand, who at the time was Southall's leading goalscorer.

The UK television series Minder episode "Last Orders at the Winchester" made by Euston Films in 1993 includes a charity football match filmed at the Western Road ground between a police team and a team of regulars from the Winchester Club.

Reggae singer Maxi Priest made an appearance for Southall in 2003. Priest registered to play with the club suffering from a player shortage crisis, as a result of injuries and suspensions. He came on as a substitute during a 3–0 defeat against Feltham, playing alongside his son Marvin.

== Fans ==
A group of Southall FC fans, including the club's former secretary Dave Considine and club historian Gary Drew, set up the Southall FC Independent Supporters Association on 27 June 2025.

Former Southall winger Gordon Hill, who went on to play for Millwall, Manchester United, Derby County, QPR and England, became the association's first patron. TV astrologer Russell Grant is one of Southall FC's celebrity fans.

== Honours and achievements ==
=== League honours ===
- Isthmian League – Division Two
  - Runners Up (1): 1974–75
- Athenian League
  - Champions (1): 1926–27
  - Runners Up (1): 1954–55
- Spartan South Midlands League – Division One
  - Champions (1): 2017–18
- Great Western Suburban League
  - Champions (1): 1912–13
- London League – Division One
  - Champions (1): 1904–05
- West Middlesex League
  - Champions (1): 1906–07

=== Cup honours ===
- FA Vase
  - Runners Up (1): 1985–86
- FA Amateur Cup
  - Runners Up (1): 1924–25
  - Semi Finalists (2): 1926–27, 1952–53
- Middlesex Senior Cup
  - Winners (13) : 1907–08, 1910–11, 1911–12, 1912–13, 1922–23, 1923–24, 1924–25, 1926–27, 1936–37, 1944–45, 1953–54, 1954–55, 2025-26
  - Runners Up (4): 1895–96, 1919–20, 1928–29, 1985–86
- Middlesex Senior Charity Cup
  - Winners (10): 1910–11, 1911–12, 1913–14, 1922–23 (joint winners with Botwell Mission), 1923–24 (joint winners with Botwell Mission), 1927–28, 1936–37, 1951–52, 1968–69, 1983–84
  - Runners Up (11): 1919–20, 1931–32, 1942–43, 1945–46, 1946–47, 1953–54, 1956–57, 1970–71, 1974–75, 1998–99, 2024–25
- London Senior Cup
  - Runners Up (1): 1997–98
- Middlesex County Football League Premier Division Cup
  - Runners Up (2): 2006–07, 2011–12
- West Middlesex Challenge Cup
  - Winners (10): 1886–87, 1895–96, 1897–98, 1898–99, 1906–07, 1907–08, 1909–10, 1910–11, 1911–12, 1921–22
  - Runners Up (3): 1891–92, 1901–02, 1912–13

=== Cup achievements ===
- FA Cup
  - 3rd round proper (1): 1935–36
  - 1st round proper (5): 1925–26, 1927–28, 1928–29, 1936–37, 1955–56
- FA Vase
  - Quarter Finalists (2): 2016–17, 2021–22
- FA Amateur Cup
  - Semi Finalists (2): 1926–27, 1952–53
  - Quarter Finalists (3): 1935–36, 1945–46, 1959–60

== Records ==
=== Club records ===
- Highest league position: 14th in Isthmian League Premier Division (1976–77)
- FA Cup best performance: Third round (1935–36)
- FA Trophy best performance: Third qualifying round (2026–27)
- FA Vase best performance: Finalists (1985–86)
- FA Amateur Cup best performance: Finalists (1924–25)
- Highest attendance: 19,094 v Watford (1935–36 FA Cup Third round proper)
- Biggest win: 12–0 v Cranleigh
- Biggest defeat: 14–0 v Grays United

=== Player records ===
- Record appearances: Reg Short (450+)
- Record goalscorer: Ken Merry (117)
- Record goals scored in a season: Charles Roach (57)

== Former players ==
Notable former Southall players include Les Ferdinand MBE (QPR, Tottenham, Newcastle and England), Alan Devonshire (West Ham and England), Gordon Hill (Manchester United and Millwall), Justin Fashanu (Norwich), Eric Young (Brighton, Wimbledon, Crystal Palace and Wales), Mark Nicholls (Chelsea), Graham Wilkins (Chelsea and Brentford), Rowan Vine (Portsmouth, Birmingham and QPR), Colin Viljoen (Ipswich, Manchester City, Chelsea and England), former Bradford and Wigan manager Chris Hutchings (who played for Chelsea, Brighton and Huddersfield) and former Leyton Orient head coach Ross Embleton.

Myles Hippolyte played for a number of clubs including Livingston, Falkirk, St Mirren, Dunfermline Athletic, Yeovil Town, Scunthorpe United, Stockport County and AFC Wimbledon. He has represented Grenada. He won the Scottish Challenge Cup with Livingston in 2015, the Scottish Championship with St Mirren in 2018, the National League and League Two titles with Stockport in 2022 and 2024 respectively, and scored the winning goal in AFC Wimbledon's 1–0 League Two play off final against Walsall at Wembley on 26 May 2025.

Arthur Shaw played 61 times as a wing half for Arsenal during a seven-year period with the Gunners, including 25 league appearances during Arsenal's 1952–53 Division One title winning season. A flag bearing his name flies in tribute on the Ken Friar Bridge, close to Arsenal tube station.

Fred Rouse was a prolific goalscorer who made more than 100 appearances as a centre forward for Wycombe, Grimsby, Stoke, Everton, Chelsea, West Bromwich Albion and Brentford. He represented the Football League XI in matches versus the Irish League XI in 1905 and 1906, scoring once in a 6–0 victory in the second match.

Gerry Cakebread OBE made 374 appearances for Brentford as a goalkeeper. He set a club record of 187 consecutive appearances for Brentford between November 1958 and August 1962, and played for England Youth and England Under 23s. He remained a part-time player throughout his career. He was posthumously inducted into the Brentford Hall of Fame in 2015, and was described as "arguably Brentford's finest ever goalkeeper".

Many former Southall players played for other London clubs. More than one in four on the former players list below have also played for Brentford, with Griffin Park (Brentford's home until August 2020) located less than five miles from Southall. Many of the players listed below have represented at least one of the following London clubs: QPR, Chelsea, Wimbledon, Crystal Palace, West Ham, Millwall, Fulham, Tottenham Hotspur, Arsenal and Leyton Orient.

Other former Southall players include:

- Charles Ballard – Played for Southall before emigrating to New Zealand in March 1913. After The Great War he represented New Zealand in two matches against Australia. His older brother Tommy 'Brancher' Ballard was a Southall stalwart, who was killed on the Western Front in October 1918. His last match at Western Road was for 3/8th Middlesex Regt., against Southall.
- Cliff Ette – Joined Southall after playing for West Ham, where he had made one appearance and scored one goal. He captained Southall in their 3–1 win against Swindon in the 1935–36 FA Cup First round, and an 8–0 second round win against Newport (IOW) saw Southall into the third round proper for the first time in the club's history.
- Frederick Chapman – Played for Nottingham Forest prior to joining Southall and was part of the Great Britain team that won Gold at the 1908 London Olympics.
- Ted Bennett – Played for QPR and Watford, was an England amateur goalkeeper and represented Great Britain at the 1952 Olympics in Helsinki.
- Frederick Gamble – Represented Brentford, West Ham, Aldershot and Reading and played first class cricket for Surrey between 1933 and 1935.
- Charles 'Wag' Roach – Scored 57 goals in one season for Southall, which remains a club record. Also played for Fulham, Reading and Tottenham's reserves. Known as Wag on account of his love of telling jokes.
- John 'Jack' Bowman played for Stoke City, QPR and Norwich City and was later manager of Norwich and QPR.
- Alan Nelmes – Made more than 300 appearances for Brentford as a defender and was inducted into the club's Hall of Fame in 2014.
- Albert Thain – Made 153 appearances for Chelsea, scoring 51 goals.
- Cyrus Vanterpool – Has made five appearances as an international for Anguilla.
- Maxi Priest and Marvin Elliott / Marvin Priest – Reggae singer Maxi Priest and his son Marvin have both played for Southall. Marvin was known by his given name, Marvin Elliott, during his Southall playing days.

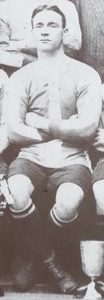
Charles 'Wag' Roach, who holds the record for most goals in a season for Southall (57)

Included on the former players list below are:

1. Players who have played/managed in the Premier League / Football League or foreign equivalents.
2. Players with international caps.
3. Players who have achieved success in other professions.
- (England) Herbert Ashford (Brentford, Queens Park Rangers)
- (Scotland) Andrew Anderson (St Mirren, Newcastle United)
- (England) H.S. 'Berty' Austin (Mardy AFC)
- (England) Charles Ballard (New Zealand)
- Cristian Barrett (England C)
- Ted Bennett (Queens Park Rangers, Watford, Great Britain, England amateur)
- (France) David Bitsindou (Kemi City)
- (England) John 'Jack' Bowman (Stoke City, Queens Park Rangers and Norwich City player and manager)
- (England) David Byrne (Millwall, Watford, Partick Thistle)
- (England) Gerry Cakebread (Brentford)
- (Scotland) Jimmy Carr (West Ham United, Reading, Southampton)
- (England) Brian Caterer (Brentford)
- (England) Sid Chandler (Aston Villa, Preston North End)
- (England) Frederick Chapman (Nottingham Forest, GB)
- (England) John 'Jack' Chapman (Brentford)
- (England) S. Chapman (Clapton Orient)
- Dennis Cutbush (England amateur international)
- (Scotland) Alex Davidson (Manchester City
- Alan Devonshire (West Ham, England)
- (England) Marvin Elliott / Marvin Priest (singer, son of Maxi Priest)
- (England) Ross Embleton (current Leyton Orient head coach)
- (England) Cliff Ette (West Ham United)
- (England) Justin Fashanu (Norwich City, Nottingham Forest)
- Les Ferdinand (Queens Park Rangers, Newcastle United, Tottenham Hotspur, England)
- (England) Dickie Foss (Chelsea)
- (Wales) Robert Fry (Crystal Palace, Queens Park Rangers)
- (England) Frederick Gamble (Brentford, West Ham United)
- (England) T. Gale (Luton Town)
- (England) Mick Gilchrist (Luton Town, Bangor City)
- (England) Bert Gower (Brentford)
- (England) Alfred Hawkins (Crystal Palace)
- (England) Leslie Heard (Fulham)
- (England) Mick Heath (Brentford, Wimbledon)
- (England) Gordon Hill (Millwall, Manchester United)
- (England) Robert Holland (Crewe Alexandra)
- (England) Chris Hutchings (Chelsea and Brighton & Hove Albion player; Bradford City and Wigan Athletic manager)
- Clifford Jones (Wales amateur international)
- (England) Roger Joseph (Brentford, Wimbledon, Leyton Orient)
- (England) Ray Knowles (Wimbledon)
- (Democratic Republic of the Congo) Goma Lambu (Mansfield Town)
- Percy Leahy (Wales amateur international)
- W. F. Lewis (Wales amateur international)
- (Scotland) Ralph McElhaney (Celtic, Tottenham Hotspur, Brentford)
- (England) Charles McKinley (Charlton, Brentford)
- (England) Frank Morrad (Leyton Orient, Brentford)
- (England) Robert Morris (Norwich City)
- (Republic of Ireland) Pat Morrissey (Coventry City
- (England) Mark Nicholls ((Chelsea)
- (England) John Payne (West Ham United, Manchester City, Brentford, Brighton & Hove Albion, Millwall)
- (England) Ron Peplow (Brentford)
- (England) Sean Priddle (Exeter City, Brentford)
- (England) Maxi Priest (reggae singer)
- (England) Charles 'Wag' Roach (Fulham, Reading)
- (England) Albert Rogers (Queens Park Rangers)
- (England) Fred Rouse (Everton, Chelsea)
- (England) Fred Ryecraft (Brentford)
- (England) J. Sangster (Queens Park Rangers)
- (England) Arthur Shaw (Queens Park Rangers, Brentford, Arsenal 1952-53 title winner, Watford)
- (England) Gary Smith (Wimbledon)
- (England) Ron Smith (Keflavik, Perth Glory and Australia interim manager)
- (England) Charles Snarey (Lincoln City)
- (England) Albert Thain (Chelsea)
- (Scotland) Peter Turnbull (Rangers, Third Lanark, Burnley, Bolton Wanderers, Blackburn Rovers, Millwall Athletic, Queens Park Rangers, Brentford, Barrow, Tranmere Rovers)
- (Wales) Sam Turner (Stockport County)
- Cyrus Vanterpool (Anguilla)
- (South Africa) Colin Viljoen (Ipswich Town, Manchester City, Chelsea, England)
- (England) Rowan Vine (Portsmouth, Luton Town, Queens Park Rangers)
- (England) George Weeks (Brentford)
- (Germany) Denis Weidlich (Hansa Rostock)
- (England) Graham Wilkins (Chelsea)
- (England) George Willis (Reading)
- (England) George Willshaw (Leyton Orient)
- Eric Young (Wimbledon, Crystal Palace, Wolverhampton Wanderers, Wales)

== Former coaches ==
Included on the former managers/coaches list below are:

1. Managers/coaches who have played, managed or coached in the Premier League / Football League or a foreign equivalent
2. Managers/coaches who have international caps
- (Northern Ireland) Dave Anderson – Was manager of AFC Wimbledon from 2004 to 2007.
- (England) Gordon Bartlett – Played for Portsmouth and Denver Dynamos. Was the longest serving manager in English football's top six tiers.
- Terry Fenwick – Played for Crystal Palace, Queens Park Rangers, Tottenham Hotspur, Swindon and England. Managed Portsmouth, Northampton Town and Trinidad & Tobago.
- (England) Mick Gilchrist – Played for Luton Town and Bangor City.
- (Republic of Ireland) Pat Morrissey – Played for Coventry City, Crewe Alexandra, and Watford.
- (England) Tommy Taylor – Played for Leyton Orient and West Ham United. Managed Cambridge United, Leyton Orient, Darlington, Boston United and Grenada.
- Tom Tranter – Has managed England Women and Keflavik in Iceland.
