= Tom Sharp (footballer) =

Scottish footballer

Personal information
- Full name: Thomas Alexander Sharp
- Date of birth: 30 July 1957 (age 69)
- Place of birth: Newmains, Scotland
- Position: Defender

Youth career
- 1975–1976: Everton

Senior career*
Years	Team	Apps	(Gls)
1976	Everton	0	(0)
1976	→ Brentford (loan)	8	(1)
1976–1977	Brentford	8	(0)
- * Club domestic league appearances and goals

Thomas Alexander Sharp (born 30 July 1957) is a Scottish retired professional footballer who played in the Football League for Brentford as a defender. He began his career at Everton and captained the youth team.

== Career statistics ==
Appearances and goals by club, season and competition
Club	Season	League			FA Cup		League Cup		Total	
Club	Season	Division	Apps	Goals	Apps	Goals	Apps	Goals	Apps	Goals
Brentford	1975–76	Fourth Division	12	1	—		—		12	1
Brentford	1976–77	Fourth Division	4	0	0	0	1	0	5	0
Career total			16	1	0	0	1	0	17	1
