= Keith Lawrence (footballer) =

English footballer

Personal information
- Full name: Keith Derek Lawrence
- Date of birth: 25 March 1954 (age 72)
- Place of birth: Sidcup, England
- Position: Centre back

Youth career
- 1972–1973: Chelsea

Senior career*
Years	Team	Apps	(Gls)
1973–1974	Chelsea	0	(0)
1974	→ West Bromwich Albion (loan)	0	(0)
1974–1976	Brentford	78	(1)
- Wealdstone
- Bromley
- Tonbridge
- Brading Town
- * Club domestic league appearances and goals

Keith Derek Lawrence (born 25 March 1954) is an English retired professional football central defender who played in the Football League for Brentford.

== Career ==
A central defender, Lawrence began his career as an apprentice at Chelsea, but was released in 1974 without making a senior appearance. He joined Second Division club West Bromwich Albion on loan in January 1974, but failed to make an appearance during four months at The Hawthorns. Lawrence signed for Fourth Division club Brentford in May 1974 and had two good seasons at Griffin Park, making 89 appearances and scoring two goals, before being surprisingly released by manager John Docherty. Following his release, Lawrence dropped into non-league football and appeared for Wealdstone, Bromley, Tonbridge and Brading Town.

== Personal life ==
After retiring from football, Lawrence joined the police force.

== Career statistics ==
Appearances and goals by club, season and competition
Club	Season	League			FA Cup		League Cup		Total	
Club	Season	Division	Apps	Goals	Apps	Goals	Apps	Goals	Apps	Goals
Brentford	1974–75	Fourth Division	43	1	2	0	2	0	47	1
Brentford	1975–76	Fourth Division	35	0	4	0	3	1	42	1
Career total			78	1	6	0	5	1	89	2
