= David Bitsindou =

French footballer (born 1989)

Personal information
- Full name: David Jonathan Bitsindou
- Date of birth: 26 March 1989 (age 37)
- Place of birth: France
- Position: Defender

Senior career*
| Years | Team | Apps | (Gls) |
| -2009 | US Chantilly | | |
| 2009-2010 | ÉDS Montluçon | 3 | (0) |
| 2010-2012 | Levski Elin Pelin | | |
| 2012 | FC Etar 1924 Veliko Tarnovo | 3 | (0) |
| 2013 | US Fontenay | | |
| 2013 | Southall F.C. | | |
| 2014-2016 | Palloseura Kemi Kings | 79 | (3) |
| 2017-2018 | USD Nerostellati 1910 | | |
| 2018 | TP-47 | 9 | (0) |
| 2019- | US Fontenay | | |
- * Club domestic league appearances and goals

David Bitsindou (born 26 March 1989) is a French footballer who now plays for US Fontenay in his home country.

== Career ==
Bitsindou started his senior career with US Chantilly. After that, he played for ÉDS Montluçon, Levski Elin Pelin, Etar 1924 Veliko Tarnovo, US Fontenay, and Southall. In 2014, he signed for Palloseura Kemi Kings in the Finnish Veikkausliiga, where he made eighty-four appearances and scored three goals.
