= Pat Morrissey =

Irish footballer and manager

Personal information
- Full name: Patrick Joseph Morrissey
- Date of birth: 23 February 1948
- Place of birth: Enniscorthy, Ireland
- Date of death: 19 February 2005 (aged 56)
- Place of death: Hammersmith, England
- Position: Centre forward

Senior career*
Years	Team	Apps	(Gls)
1965–1968	Coventry City	10	(0)
1968–1969	Torquay United	21	(0)
1969–1971	Crewe Alexandra	96	(28)
1971	Chester	9	(1)
1971–1974	Watford	107	(27)
1974–1977	Aldershot	109	(27)
1977	→ Swansea City (loan)	4	(0)
1977–1978	Dartford		
1978–1980	Hayes	77	(30)
1980–1981	Slough Town	39	(3)
1981	Carshalton Athletic		
1981–1982	Hendon	19	(4)
1982–1985	Chesham United		
1985–1988	Dunstable Town		

International career
1966	Republic of Ireland U23	1	(0)

Managerial career
- Chesham United
- Dunstable Town
- Southall
- Buckingham Town
- Colney Heath
- * Club domestic league appearances and goals

Patrick Joseph Morrissey (23 February 1948 – 19 February 2005) was an Irish professional association footballer, who played as a striker.

Morrissey was born in Enniscorthy, County Wexford, but moved to England as a young child, and played schoolboy football at county level. In a career spanning 25 years, Morrissey played for Coventry City, Torquay United, Crewe Alexandra, Chester, Watford, Aldershot (who signed him in exchange for Roger Joslyn), Swansea City, Dartford, Hayes, Slough Town, Carshalton Athletic, Hendon, Chesham United, Dunstable Town and Southall. He also played for the Republic of Ireland national under-23 football team.

Morrissey's first managerial role was as a player manager at Chesham United. He fulfilled the same roles at Dunstable Town and Southall, and also managed Buckingham Town and Colney Heath. He died in 2005. He had two sons, both of whom have played for Colney Heath.
