= Gordon Bartlett =

English footballer (born 1955)

Personal information
- Full name: Gordon Bartlett
- Date of birth: 3 December 1955 (age 70)
- Place of birth: Chiswick, England
- Position: Forward

Youth career
- 1973: West Ham United
- 1973–1974: Portsmouth

Senior career*
Years	Team	Apps	(Gls)
1973–1975	Portsmouth	2	(1)
1975	Denver Dynamos		
1975–1977	Slough Town	32	(5)
1977	Brentford	0	(0)

Managerial career
- 1985-1986: Southall
- 1986–1989: Hounslow
- 1991–1995: Yeading
- 1995–2017: Wealdstone
- * Club domestic league appearances and goals

Gordon Bartlett (born 3 December 1955) is an English former professional footballer who played as a forward.

== Playing career ==
Bartlett was born in London. After beginning his career with West Ham United and Portsmouth, he played for the Denver Dynamos in the North American Soccer League. Following his time in the US, he returned to England and signed for non-league side Slough Town where he stayed for two years, making 43 appearances and scoring seven times. He appeared in pre-season friendlies for Brentford, but failed to make a competitive appearance. His playing career was cut short by injury.

== Managerial career ==
After managerial spells at Yeading, Hounslow and Southall, Bartlett joined Wealdstone as manager in June 1995.

Between May 2013 and August 2017, he was the longest-serving manager in the top six tiers of the English football pyramid system. On 21 August 2017, after 22 years in the role, it was announced that he had stepped down as the club's manager but would remain with the club in a backroom role.

== Honours ==
=== As a manager ===
Wealdstone

- Isthmian League Premier Division: 2013–14
- Isthmian League Second Division second-place promotion: 1997–98
- Isthmian League Third Division: 1996–97
- Middlesex Senior Charity Cup: 2003–04, 2010–11

Yeading

- Isthmian League First Division second-place promotion: 1991–92

Hounslow

- Hellenic League Premier Division second-place promotion: 1986–87

=== As an individual ===
- Isthmian League Manager of the Year: 2013–14

== See also ==
- List of football managers with the most matches
