= William A. Barnhill =

American photographer (1889–1987)

William A. Barnhill (November 26, 1889 – December 7, 1987) was an American photographer best known for his work in the Appalachian Mountains of western North Carolina in the early 1900s. His love of hiking and photography took him to the mountains of western North Carolina between 1914 and 1917. The photographs he took during those trips have been featured in American Heritage and Life magazines, as well as in the collections of the Library of Congress, the New York Public Library, the Pack Memorial Public Library of Asheville, North Carolina, and various college libraries. During World War I, as a Lieutenant in the US Army he commanded a photographic section in the 91st Aero Squadron. Some of his photographs from the war were used in the New York Times during the war. He worked as a commercial photographer in Asheville and Cleveland after the war.

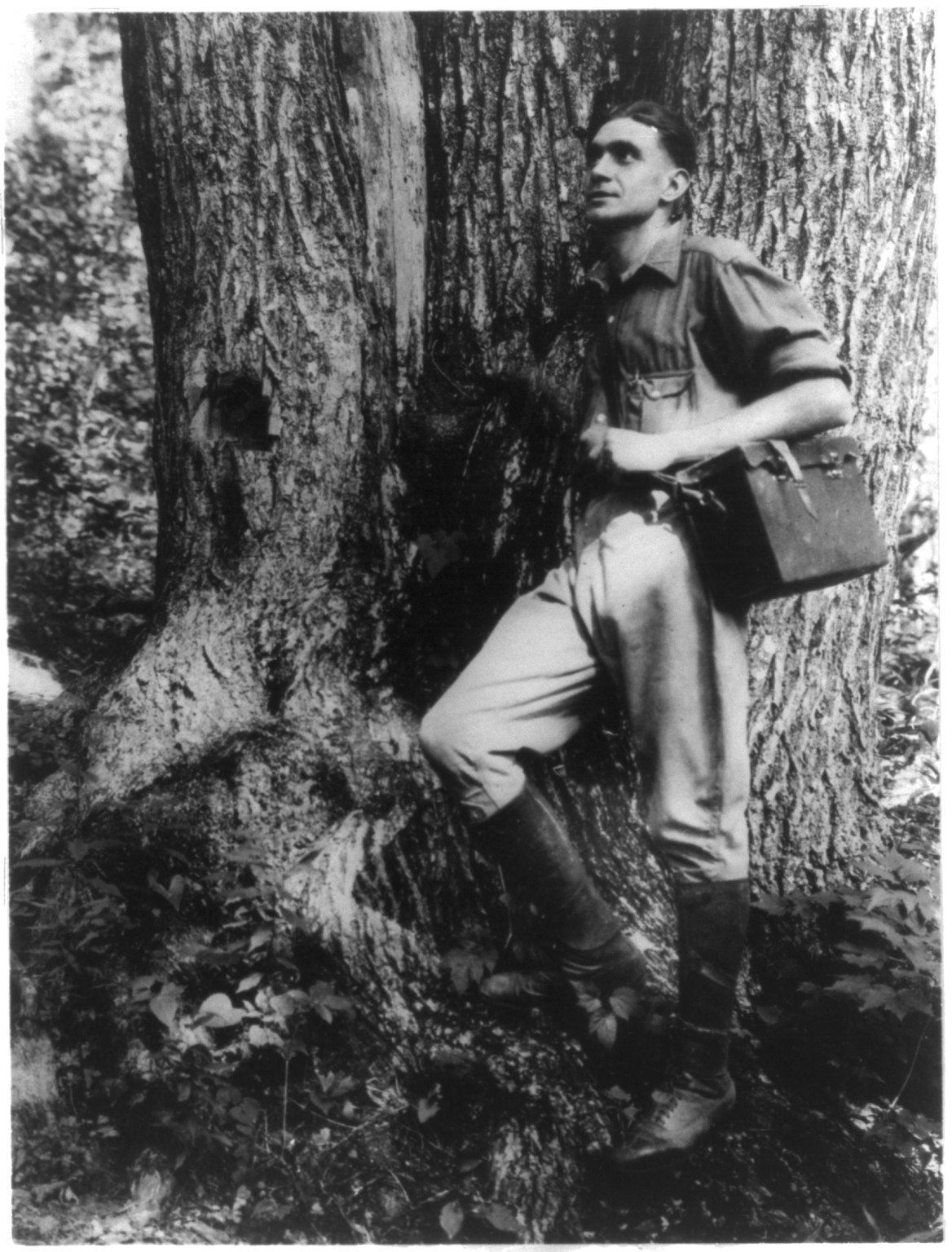
