= Willie Brown (footballer, born 1950) =

Scottish footballer

Personal information
- Full name: William Brown
- Date of birth: 5 February 1950 (age 76)
- Place of birth: Falkirk, Scotland
- Height: 5 ft 9 in (1.75 m)
- Position: Centre forward

Senior career*
Years	Team	Apps	(Gls)
1967–1969	Burnley	1	(0)
1969–1970	Carlisle United	19	(8)
1969	→ Barrow (loan)	6	(1)
1970–1974	Newport County	168	(50)
1974	→ Hereford United (loan)	9	(6)
1974–1975	Brentford	16	(9)
1975–1978	Torquay United	139	(47)
Total		358	(121)
- * Club domestic league appearances and goals

William Brown (born 5 February 1950 in Falkirk) is a Scottish former professional footballer, who played as a centre forward.

Willie Brown began his career as a junior at Burnley, turning professional in February 1967. His only league appearance for the Clarets came as a substitute for Dave Thomas in the 2–3 defeat away at West Bromwich Albion on 24 August 1968. In July 1969, he moved to Carlisle United on a free transfer, but was sent on loan to Barrow in September 1969, scoring once in 6 league games. He returned to Carlisle, scoring 8 goals in 19 league games that season, before leaving for Newport County in August 1970 for a fee of £1,500.

He fitted into the Newport side and became a regular goalscorer, scoring 50 goals in 168 league appearances. Towards the end of the 1973–74 season, Brown found himself out of favour at Newport, joining Hereford United on loan in March 1974, scoring 6 goals in only 9 league games for the Bulls.

In November 1974 he joined Brentford for a fee of £4,000, and although he scored 9 times in 16 league games he failed to settle in London and joined Torquay United in March 1975 for a fee of £5,000. His regular goalscoring soon made him a crowd favourite at Plainmoor, Brown scoring 47 goals in 139 league games before leaving league football in 1978. He was later commercial manager at Western League side Minehead, and owned a newsagents in Minehead.
