= Graham Horn =

English footballer

Personal information
- Full name: Graham Roy Horn
- Date of birth: 23 August 1954
- Place of birth: Westminster, England
- Date of death: 29 June 2012 (aged 57)
- Place of death: Torbay, England
- Height: 6 ft 2 in (1.88 m)
- Position: Goalkeeper

Senior career*
Years	Team	Apps	(Gls)
1971–1972	Arsenal	0	(0)
1972	→ Portsmouth (loan)	22	(0)
1972–1976	Luton Town	58	(0)
1975	→ Brentford (loan)	3	(0)
1976	Los Angeles Aztecs	17	(0)
1977–1977	Charlton Athletic	0	(0)
1977–1978	Kettering Town		
1978–1979	Southend United	9	(0)
1979–1982	Aldershot	9	(0)
1982–1984	Torquay United	47	(0)
1984	Barnstaple Town		
Total		165	(0)
- * Club domestic league appearances and goals

Graham Horn (23 August 1954 – 29 June 2012) was an English professional footballer who played as a goalkeeper.

== Career ==
Born in Westminster, Horn was active in both England and the United States, and made over 150 career league appearances for Arsenal, Portsmouth, Luton Town, Brentford, the Los Angeles Aztecs, Charlton Athletic, Kettering Town, Southend United, Aldershot, Torquay United and Barnstaple Town.

== Later life ==
He died on 29 June 2012, aged 57.
