= Kevin Harding =

English footballer

Personal information
- Full name: Kevin Harding
- Date of birth: 19 March 1957 (age 69)
- Place of birth: Isleworth, England
- Position: Defender

Youth career
- 1972–1974: Brentford

Senior career*
Years	Team	Apps	(Gls)
1974–1975	Brentford	8	(0)
1975–1976	Hayes	34	(0)
- * Club domestic league appearances and goals

Kevin Harding (born 19 March 1957) is an English retired footballer who played in the Football League for Brentford as a defender.

== Playing career ==
=== Brentford ===
Harding was one of the first players recruited when the Brentford youth team was relaunched in 1972. He captained the youth team during the 1972–73 season and made a London Challenge Cup appearance for the reserve team against Tottenham Hotspur while still aged 15. Harding made three league appearances during the Bees' 1974–75 Fourth Division campaign. Harding was released at the end of the season.

=== Hayes ===
Harding joined Isthmian League First Division club Hayes during the 1975 off-season and made 34 appearances during the 1975–76 season.

== Career statistics ==
Appearances and goals by club, season and competition
Club	Season	League			FA Cup		League Cup		Total	
Club	Season	Division	Apps	Goals	Apps	Goals	Apps	Goals	Apps	Goals
Brentford	1973–74	Fourth Division	5	0	0	0	0	0	5	0
Brentford	1974–75	Fourth Division	3	0	0	0	0	0	3	0
Career total			8	0	0	0	0	0	8	0
