= Guy Bristow =

English footballer

Personal information
- Full name: Guy Austin Bristow
- Date of birth: 23 October 1955 (age 71)
- Place of birth: Kingsbury, England
- Position: Central defender

Youth career
- 1971–1973: Watford

Senior career*
Years	Team	Apps	(Gls)
1973–1977	Watford	23	(0)
- Lillehammer FK
- * Club domestic league appearances and goals

Guy Austin Bristow (born 23 October 1955) is an English retired professional footballer who played as a central defender in the Football League for Watford. He later played in Norway for Lillehammer FK.
