= Hounslow Chronicle =

Tabloid newspaper

The Hounslow Chronicle is a local weekly tabloid newspaper distributed in west London, England. It mainly covers stories from the London Borough of Hounslow. It was founded as The County of Middlesex Chronicle in 1859.
