= George Willshaw =

English footballer

Personal information
- Full name: George James Willshaw
- Date of birth: 18 October 1912
- Place of birth: Hackney, England
- Date of death: September 1993 (aged 80)
- Place of death: Bournemouth, England
- Height: 5 ft 6 in (1.68 m)
- Position: Outside left

Senior career*
Years	Team	Apps	(Gls)
1933–1934	Southall		
1934–1936	Walthamstow Avenue		
1936–1938	Southend United	28	(6)
1938–1939	Bristol City	34	(9)
1939–1947	Leyton Orient	12	(2)
1947	Margate		
- * Club domestic league appearances and goals

George James Willshaw (18 October 1912 – September 1993) was an English professional footballer who played in the Football League for Bristol City, Southend United and Leyton Orient as an outside left.

== Personal life ==
Willshaw served in the British Armed Forces during the Second World War.

== Career statistics ==
Appearances and goals by club, season and competition
Club	Season	League			FA Cup		Total	
Club	Season	Division	Apps	Goals	Apps	Goals	Apps	Goals
Leyton Orient	1946–47	Third Division South	12	2	0	0	12	2
Career total			12	2	0	0	12	2
