= Barry Salvage =

English footballer and manager

Personal information
- Full name: Barry John Salvage
- Date of birth: 21 December 1946
- Place of birth: Bristol, England
- Date of death: 14 October 1986 (aged 39)
- Place of death: Eastbourne, England
- Position: Left winger

Senior career*
Years	Team	Apps	(Gls)
1965–1967	Eastbourne United		
1967–1969	Fulham	7	(0)
1969–1970	Millwall	2	(0)
1971–1973	Queens Park Rangers	21	(1)
1973–1975	Brentford	87	(8)
1975–1977	Millwall	55	(9)
1977	St. Louis Stars	26	(1)
1978	Hastings United		
1979–1980	Åkra IL		
1981	Kopervik IL		
1982–1983	Haugar		
1983–1984	Eastbourne United		
1984–1986	Eastbourne Town	14	(4)

Managerial career
- 1979–1980: Åkra IL (player-manager)
- 1981: Kopervik IL (player-manager)
- 1982–1983: Haugar (player-manager)
- * Club domestic league appearances and goals

Barry John Salvage (21 December 1946 – 14 October 1986) was an English professional footballer who played in the Football League for Brentford, Millwall, Queens Park Rangers and Fulham as a left winger. He later became a manager in Norway.

== Career ==
=== Eastbourne United ===
A winger, Salvage began his career at Athenian League Second Division club Eastbourne United. He won promotion to the First Division in 1967 and departed the club in September that year.

=== Fulham ===
Salvage moved up to the Football League to join First Division club Fulham in September 1967. He had five appearances during a disastrous 1967–68 season for the Cottagers, which saw the club relegated to Second Division with a bottom-place finish. Salvage made just two appearances during the 1968–69 season and departed Fulham in March 1969. He made just seven appearances during his two years at Craven Cottage.

=== Millwall ===
Salvage moved across London to sign for Second Division club Millwall in March 1969. He had a torrid time with the Lions, making just two appearances before departing at the end of the 1969–70 season.

=== Queens Park Rangers ===
Salvage moved back to West London to join Second Division club Queens Park Rangers in March 1971. He failed to break through into the first team, making 24 appearances and scoring one goal before departing in February 1973.

=== Brentford ===
Salvage dropped down to the Third Division to sign for Brentford for a £9,000 fee in February 1973. He had a good start to his time at Griffin Park, scoring on his debut in a 5–0 rout of Port Vale and later that month he scored one of the fastest goals in club history, after just 24 seconds of a match versus Charlton Athletic. He made 16 appearances and scored three goals in which remained of the 1972–73 season, but could not prevent the Bees suffering relegation to the Fourth Division. He established himself in the first team over the following two seasons, making 76 appearances and scoring five goals, but Brentford remained rooted in the Fourth Division. Salvage departed the Bees at the end of the 1974–75 season, having made 91 appearances and scored eight goals during his time at Griffin Park.

=== Return to Millwall ===
Salvage returned to Millwall in August 1975. Now playing Third Division football, he banished the memories of his previous spell with the club by making 42 appearances, scoring six goals and helping the Lions to secure promotion to the Second Division with a third-place finish. Salvage's appearance-count dropped to 20 in the Second Division and he was released at the end of the 1976–77 season. Salvage made 67 appearances and scored 10 goals during his two spells at The Den.

=== St. Louis Stars ===
Salvage moved to the United States in 1977 to sign for North American Soccer League club St. Louis Stars. He made 25 appearances and scored one goal as the Stars fell to the Rochester Lancers in the first round of the 1977 playoffs. In a match against Toronto Metros-Croatia, Salvage caught the Toronto goalkeeper Zeljko Bilecki in the head sparking a mass brawl among players and coaches leading the referee to abandon the match.

=== Later career ===
Following a brief spell with Southern League Premier Division club Hastings United, Salvage moved to Norway in 1979 and played for lower league clubs Åkra, Kopervik and Haugar. He took the name "Berdines Salvanes" while with Åkra. After returning from Norway, Salvage played for both Eastbourne United and Eastbourne Town, scoring seven goals in 21 appearances for the latter.

== Managerial career ==
While with Åkra, Kopervik and Haugar in Norway, Salvage combined his playing duties with that of the clubs' manager.

== Personal life ==
Salvage died in Eastbourne, East Sussex, as a result of a heart attack while competing in a charity run on 14 October 1986. He was only 39 years old.

== Career statistics ==
Appearances and goals by club, season and competition
Club	Season	League			National Cup		League Cup		Other		Total	
Club	Season	Division	Apps	Goals	Apps	Goals	Apps	Goals	Apps	Goals	Apps	Goals
Fulham	1967–68	First Division	5	0	0	0	0	0	—		5	0
Millwall	1968–69	Second Division	2	0	—		—		—		2	0
Queens Park Rangers	1970–71	Second Division	3	0	1	0	—		—		4	0
Queens Park Rangers	1971–72	Second Division	15	1	0	0	1	0	—		16	1
Queens Park Rangers	1972–73	Second Division	3	0	1	0	0	0	—		4	0
Queens Park Rangers	Total		21	1	2	0	1	0	—		24	1
Brentford	1972–73	Third Division	16	3	—		—		—		16	3
Brentford	1973–74	Fourth Division	37	5	0	0	1	0	—		38	5
Brentford	1974–75	Fourth Division	34	0	2	0	2	0	—		38	0
Brentford	Total		87	8	2	0	3	0	—		92	8
Millwall	1975–76	Third Division	35	5	5	1	2	0	—		42	6
Millwall	1976–77	Second Division	20	3	0	0	5	1	—		25	4
Millwall	Total		55	8	5	1	7	1	—		67	10
St. Louis Stars	1977	North American Soccer League	25	1	—		—		—		25	1
Eastbourne Town	1984–85	Sussex County League First Division	9	3	—		—		3 (Note: 2 appearances in Sussex RUR Cup, 1 appearance Sussex County League Cup)		12	3
Eastbourne Town	1985–86	Sussex County League First Division	5	1	1	1	—		3 (Note: Appearances in Borough Centenary Cup)	2	9	4
Eastbourne Town	Total		14	4	1	1	—		6	2	21	7
Career total			207	22	10	2	11	1	6	2	234	27

== Honours ==
Åkra

- 4. divisjon: 1979
