= Goma Lambu =

Congolese footballer

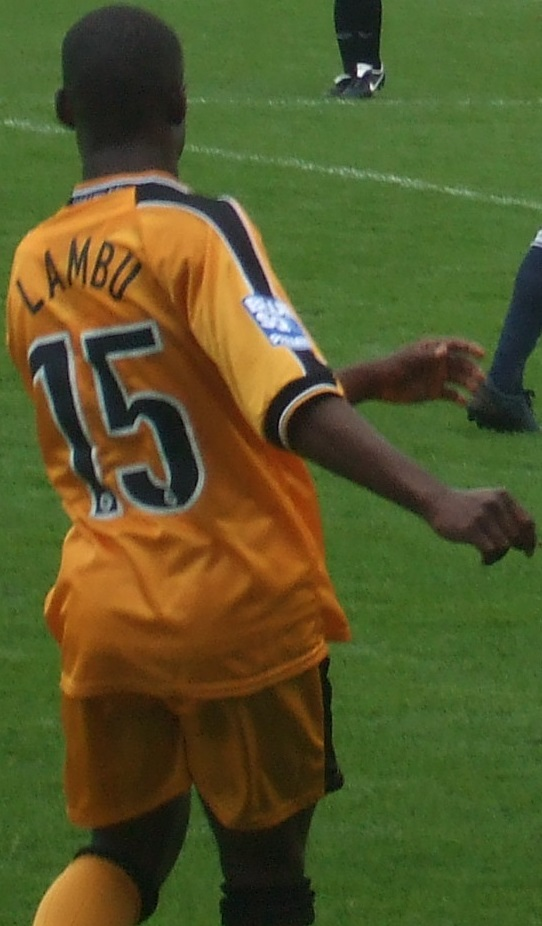
- Lambu playing for Woking in 2008

Personal information
- Full name: Goma Lambu
- Date of birth: 10 November 1984 (age 41)
- Positions: Right wing; attacking midfielder

Team information
- Current team: Kingstonian

Senior career*
Years	Team	Apps	(Gls)
2001–2003	Millwall	0	(0)
2003–2004	Fisher Athletic		
2004	Tooting & Mitcham United	9	(1)
2004	Southall		
2004–2005	Hornchurch		
2005	Redbridge		
2005	Mansfield Town	1	(0)
2005–2006	Dulwich Hamlet		(?)
2006–2009	Woking	110	(4)
2009–????	Croydon Athletic		
????–2012	Woking		
2012–	Kingstonian		
- * Club domestic league appearances and goals as of 14:38, 2 October 2012 (UTC)

Goma Lambu (born 10 November 1984) is a Congolese footballer who plays as an attacking midfielder or right winger for Kingstonian.

== Career ==
Lambu has played at Millwall and Mansfield Town and played for the England under-16 team. Following his release from Mansfield, Fisher Athletic, Tooting & Mitcham United, Southall, Hornchurch and Redbridge. In 2003, he had a trial at Chelsea.

At 21, he signed at the beginning of the 2006–07 season on a contract to keep him at Woking until the end of that season. On 6 June 2007, he signed another one-year contract which saw him at Woking until 2008. Lambu was released in 2009.

He joined Croydon Athletic following his release from Woking. Goma Lambu joined Kingstonian before the start of the 2012–13 season after another spell with Woking
