= Larry McGettigan =

English footballer

Personal information
- Full name: Lawrence McGettigan
- Date of birth: 25 December 1952
- Place of birth: Hackney, England
- Date of death: 9 January 1994 (aged 41)
- Place of death: Watford, England
- Position: Right winger

Senior career*
Years	Team	Apps	(Gls)
1968–1975	Watford	50	(3)
1975	Barnsley	0	(0)
1976	Brentford	0	(0)
- Emeralds
- Sandridge Rovers
- * Club domestic league appearances and goals

Lawrence McGettigan (25 December 1952 – January 1994) was an English professional footballer who played in the Football League for Watford as a right winger.

== Personal life ==
McGettigan died of a heart attack at the age of 41.

== Career statistics ==
Appearances and goals by club, season and competition
Club	Season	League			FA Cup		League Cup		Total	
Club	Season	Division	Apps	Goals	Apps	Goals	Apps	Goals	Apps	Goals
Watford	1971–72	Second Division	25	3	0	0	4	0	29	3
Watford	1972–73	Third Division	13	0	0	0	0	0	13	0
Watford	1973–74	Third Division	1	0	0	0	0	0	1	0
Watford	1974–75	Third Division	11	0	1	0	0	0	12	0
Total			50	3	1	0	4	0	55	3
