= Jess Willard (footballer) =

English footballer and coach

Personal information
- Full name: Cecil Thomas Frederick Willard
- Date of birth: 16 January 1924
- Place of birth: Chichester, England
- Date of death: 6 May 2005 (aged 81)
- Place of death: Chichester, England
- Positions: Right half; inside forward

Senior career*
Years	Team	Apps	(Gls)
- Chichester
1946–1953	Brighton & Hove Albion	190	(22)
1953–1955	Crystal Palace	46	(5)

Managerial career
- Crystal Palace (youth team)
- 1975: Brentford (caretaker)
- * Club domestic league appearances and goals

Cecil Thomas Frederick Willard (16 January 1924 – 6 May 2005), known as Jess Willard, was an English professional footballer who played as a right half and inside forward in the Football League for Brighton & Hove Albion and Crystal Palace. After his retirement from playing he became a coach and trainer, first managing the youth team and serving as first team coach at Crystal Palace, then later working as trainer at Brentford and presiding over one match as caretaker manager in January 1975.

== Personal life ==
Willard attended the Lancastrian School in his home town of Chichester and later worked for Shippam's. He boxed in his youth and acquired the nickname "Jess". Willard served in the Royal Air Force during the Second World War. As of March 2001, Willard was living in Turners Hill Park, Sussex.
