= Barnhill Community High School =

Location
- Yeading Lane; Yeading, Greater London, UB4 9LE; England; 51.5317°N 0.3984°W

Information
- Type: Academy
- Department for Education URN: 137844 Tables
- Ofsted: Reports
- Head Teacher: John Jones
- Staff: Yes
- Gender: Mixed
- Age: 11 to 18
- Enrolment: 1,850
- Houses: Red, Blue, Purple, Orange, Yellow & Green
- Colours: Gold, Maroon, Burgundy
- Website: http://www.barnhill.hillingdon.sch.uk/

Barnhill Community High School, sometimes shortened to Barnhill, is a coeducational secondary school located in the Yeading area of the London Borough of Hillingdon, England. In 2012 the school converted to an academy.

Its predecessor, Barnhill Secondary School, was originally opened in 1950, and celebrated 21 years in 1971.

The school is part of a Multi-Academy Trust, the Barnhill Partnership, with Belmore Primary School.

The school was inspected in 2012 and judged Good. In 2016 a short inspection was carried out and again the judgement was Good.

In 2017, Preetmal Poonith, a mathematics teacher at the school, was awarded a Silver Pearson Teaching Award for Teacher of the Year in a Secondary School.
