= Barry Gordine =

English footballer

Personal information
- Full name: Barry Gordine
- Date of birth: 1 September 1948 (age 78)
- Place of birth: Bethnal Green, England
- Position: Goalkeeper

Senior career*
Years	Team	Apps	(Gls)
–1968	Gravesend & Northfleet		
1968	Sheffield United	0	(0)
1968–1971	Oldham Athletic	83	(0)
1971–1974	Southend United	0	(0)
1974–1975	Brentford	0	(0)
- * Club domestic league appearances and goals

Barry Gordine (born 1 September 1948) is an English retired professional footballer who played in the Football League for Oldham Athletic as a goalkeeper. He later served Reading as an academy coach.
