= Steve Sherwood =

English footballer

Personal information
- Full name: Stephen Sherwood
- Date of birth: 10 December 1953 (age 72)
- Place of birth: Selby, England
- Height: 6 ft 4 in (1.93 m)
- Position: Goalkeeper

Youth career
- Chelsea

Senior career*
Years	Team	Apps	(Gls)
1971–1976	Chelsea	16	(0)
1973	→ Millwall (loan)	1	(0)
1974	→ Brentford (loan)	16	(0)
1974–1975	→ Brentford (loan)	46	(0)
1976	→ Hartford Bicentennials (loan)	13	(0)
1976–1987	Watford	211	(1)
1987–1992	Grimsby Town	183	(0)
1993	Northampton Town	16	(0)
1994–1995	Lincoln City	7	(0)
1995–1997	Gateshead	64	(0)
1997–1998	Gainsborough Trinity		
Total		573	(1)
- * Club domestic league appearances and goals

Stephen Sherwood (born 10 December 1953) is an English former professional footballer who played as a goalkeeper, best remembered for his time at Watford, Chelsea and Grimsby Town.

== Career ==
Sherwood played for Watford for 11 years, making 211 league appearances during Watford's most successful years under Graham Taylor and was in goal for the team when they lost 2–0 to Everton in the 1984 FA Cup final. He is one of the few goalkeepers to score a goal, against Coventry in 1984. His opposite number that day was Raddy Avramovic.

He started his career at Chelsea, breaking into the first team and making just 16 appearances between 1971 and 1976. At the end of the second of two loan spells with Brentford, he became the first ever loan player to go through a season as an ever-present in league matches, playing 46 matches in 1974–75, a season in which he was also voted the club's Supporters' Player of the Year. After Watford he played for Grimsby Town and Northampton Town and made an exit from league football in 1994 at the age of 40, moving on to Gateshead before retiring in 1998 with Gainsborough Trinity.

== Personal life ==
His older brother is John Sherwood, a bronze medallist for hurdles at the 1968 Mexico City Olympics. He is now a financial adviser in Grimsby.

== Honours ==
Watford

- FA Cup runner-up: 1983–84

Individual

- Brentford Supporters' Player of the Year: 1974–75
