= Roger Cross (footballer) =

English footballer (born 1948)

Personal information
- Full name: Roger George Cross
- Date of birth: 20 October 1948 (age 78)
- Place of birth: East Ham, England
- Position: Forward

Youth career
- 1964–1966: West Ham United

Senior career*
Years	Team	Apps	(Gls)
1966–1969	West Ham United	8	(1)
1968	→ Leyton Orient (loan)	6	(2)
1969–1972	Brentford	62	(20)
1972–1973	Fulham	40	(8)
1973–1977	Brentford	145	(52)
1977	Seattle Sounders	8	(2)
1977–1979	Millwall	18	(0)
- * Club domestic league appearances and goals

Roger George Cross (born 20 October 1948) is an English former professional footballer who played as a forward.

== Playing career ==
Cross' association with West Ham began with his signing as an apprentice in July 1964. He was the top scorer in the reserve team for two seasons running, but failed to establish himself in the Hammers first team and was loaned to Leyton Orient in October 1968 for two months. In 1969, after 8 appearances and one goal for West Ham, he moved to Brentford for £10,000. Cross went on to play for Fulham, who signed him for £30,000 and he scored 10 goals in 45 league and cup appearances for the west London club. He had a second spell with Brentford and took his Bee's tally to 228 appearances and 79 goals. He then joined Millwall for £9,500 in January 1977. In 1977, Cross moved to the US to play for the Seattle Sounders of the North American Soccer League.

== Coaching and scouting career ==
In 1979, he became youth team manager at Millwall. After a period on the coaching staff at Queens Park Rangers, he moved to Tottenham Hotspur, where he later became assistant manager to Gerry Francis. He rejoined West Ham as reserve team coach in the summer of 2001, later going on to become chief scout. In April 2011, West Ham sacked Cross from the role. He went on to scout for Charlton Athletic.

In 2018, he was appointed Head of Recruitment at Southend United.

== Honours ==
- Brentford Hall of Fame
