= History of Wycombe Wanderers F.C. =

History of an English football club

The history of Wycombe Wanderers F.C. covers the full history of the club from its formation to the last completed season and even its recent years.

== History ==
=== Formation and early years (1887–1895) ===
Four histories have been published, Ted Rolph's in 1957, Steve Daglish's in 1984, John Goldsworthy's in 1990 and Steve Peart and Dave Finch's in 1996. These are the only sources, in addition to the local newspaper the Bucks Free Press which detail the formation of the club. Ted Rolph's notes of a conversation with John Randell, Wycombe Wanderers first ever goalkeeper, only published in 1996, provide perhaps the best information available. John Randell explains that a group of young lads from Wheelers Field, an area to the north of High Wycombe, started a team to play matches in 1884. This team was called North Town Wanderers.

In 1887, a meeting was called by Jim Ray, backed by Datchet Webb at the Steam Engine Public House in Station Road, High Wycombe. The name North Town Wanderers was proposed by Noel Curtis but John Randell proposed the name Wycombe Wanderers, on the grounds that some of the players lived in other parts of the town. After a discussion, the name Wycombe Wanderers was agreed. The meeting also resulted in the appointments of Brewers Drayman Billy Dimmock as Chairman, Datchet Webb as Captain, George Cook as treasurer and Jim Ray as Secretary. It is highly likely the club was named Wanderers after the famous Wanderers F.C., winners of the first F.A. Cup in 1872, who visited the town on 15 December 1877 and defeated High Wycombe 9–0 en route to their fifth and final F.A. Cup triumph. The varsity colours of Oxford and Cambridge blue were also chosen, although the club had no direct connection with the Universities, the players being local working men. The meeting also saw the club apply and gain junior status and began its inaugural season playing friendly matches and competing in the High Wycombe Challenge Cup. The club's first ever game was a goal-less draw against the Wycombe Nose Club on 24 September 1887.

In 1889–1890 the club committee decided to enter two teams in the High Wycombe Challenge Cup. The reserves were entered as Wycombe Wanderers whilst the first team adopted the name Wild West. They beat High Wycombe 2–0 in the final in a second replay, after the first two matches ended one-each. Jim Ray and Edward Crook scored the goals to secure the first much coveted trophy for the club.

The early years saw the club change its headquarters, using a number of public houses close to the Rye. In addition to the Steam Engine, they included the Masons Arms and the Nags Head. The Rye was, and still is today, a long stretch of public land to the east of the town centre. In 1891 the club secured the use of the Cricket Ground for a Junior Cup tie. This enabled the club to charge spectators and keep out the rowdy element which afflicted all football at the time. The following season saw the club use the cricket ground on a regular basis. At the start of the 1893–94 season the club secured the use of Spring Meadow for a £5 annual rent. Integral in this move was right-back Charley Harper, who became secretary. The move was a great success, with a 2,000 crowd recorded for a friendly against Wolverton London and North Western Railway. There was also a Cup double, with victories in both the High Wycombe Challenge Cup and the Maidenhead Norfolkians Cup.

Despite the success, there was some discontent in the summer of 1894 as many of the players wanted the club to retain its junior status. At a meeting in the Nags Head in July, the proposal that Wanderers enter the Berks & Bucks Senior Cup, the FA Amateur Cup and the FA Cup was carried unanimously. The club's first taste of Amateur Cup football ended in a 5–1 defeat at West Herts; however, the High Wycombe Challenge Cup was retained. At the end of the 1894–95 season the club was informed that Spring Meadow had been sold, and it was soon built over by the London Marylebone railway line. The club approached Lord Carrington, who owned Wycombe Abbey and the surrounding estate including Loakes Park who responded by letter stating he had no objections. The club's AGM saw the General Committee enlarged to fifteen members and the Match Committee (which selected the teams) set at six. The Nags Head remained the club's headquarters but the Red Lion Hotel was to be used as the team's changing facilities. The first competitive game at Loakes Park was also the club's first ever FA Cup tie. A first qualifying round fixture against Wolverton London and North Western Railway, which ended in an unlucky 3–2 defeat. The move to Loakes Park proved to be a real catalyst and the club played a friendly fixture against FA Amateur Cup holders Middlesbrough. The ground also hosted its first female game. The season also saw the birth of an intense and bitter rivalry with Marlow when the teams met in the first round proper of the F.A. Amateur Cup. 1,500 Wanderers fans travelled the five miles to the Crown Ground, many of whom walked, and they were part of 2,700 crowd who witnessed a thrilling match. An Ellerton goal four minutes from time sealed a 3–2 win for Marlow. In May 1896 the club learned that their application to join the Southern League had been accepted.

=== The Southern League years (1896–1908) ===
Entering the league was a big gamble, with away games as far as Bristol and Southampton but the club was keen to get away from friendly games and provide more attractive home games for their supporters. It was also a league dominated by professional teams, and rumours circulated that the club was to turn professional. However, the club saw no need and competed as amateurs. 1896 The club finished fifth its first season in the Southern League Second Division and the rivalry with Marlow continued with defeat by ten men in the final of the Berks & Bucks Senior Cup in front of 4,000. It was to become a recurring theme, as two further painful defeats followed in 1899 and 1900. The latter proved to be a controversial match, with Marlow captain Ted Shaw walking off the pitch in protest at having three goals ruled out for offside, and he was followed by his goalkeeper. The game continued without them and they were persuaded to re-join the match. Marlow equalised in the last minute of the game by bundling Wanderers goalkeeper Ernie Wheeler into the back of net after he had held onto the ball for too long. This time the Wanderers players refused to play extra-time; however, the game eventually started as dusk began to fall. Marlow went on to lead 4–3 with six minutes remaining when the ball was kicked onto the railway embankment. The crowd refused to give the ball back and pitch was engulfed by supporters. The referee abandoned the match and Wycombe refused to play the remaining six minutes; the cup was subsequently awarded to Marlow. It would prove to be a watershed moment, particularly for Marlow, whose victory would be their last for 91 years. Wycombe refused to enter the Berks & Bucks Senior Cup in the 1900–01 season in protest.

In the summer of 1899 the club vacated Loakes Park temporarily to allow for the infamous bent pitch to be straightened. The club began playing at the alternative venue of Barrack Meadow, but only three games were played there as it was against military rules to charge admission on the ground. The Wanderers moved to Daws Hill Park, part of Wycombe Abbey Park, on a former hockey pitch. Although Lord Carrington kindly allowed the club to use the ground rent free, they had to build a bridge over the Dyke from the Rye as the main gates weren't allowed to be used. The club returned to Loakes Park for the start of the 1901–02 season and the holy grail, the Berks & Bucks Senior Cup was finally won. The final was played at Maidenhead against Slough and goals from Bill Buchanan, Bob White and Fred 'Sunny' Rouse gave the Blues a 3–0 win. It was the club's first win as a senior side, and the club felt it had truly established itself. Fred Rouse became the Chairboys first professional player when he signed professional forms for Shepherds Bush.

The summer of 1903 saw Bernard "Bunny" Hooper become captain and Loakes Park was improved with a fund initiated to build a stand. The stand was completed in January 1904. The following season saw the Wanderers denied the first appearance in the first round proper of the FA Cup, losing 4–1 to Brentford at Loakes Park. In 1904 the club became the last Amateur club to compete in the Southern League. This soon became a distinct disadvantage and results soon suffered. Attendances and gate receipts fell. The 1905–06 saw the club finish bottom of the Southern League Second Division. Debate followed whether the club should embrace professionalism but there was little appetite for turning their back on the amateur game. The 1906–07 season also saw the Blues finish bottom and the worst ever season in the club's history followed in 1907–08. The club won just one of its 18 league games.

=== The pursuit of purpose (First World War) (1908–1921) ===
In the summer of 1908 Charley Harper tendered his resignation for the third time and it was reluctantly accepted. He had played a crucial role in the development of the club and his loss was greatly felt. The Wanderers were invited to retain their membership of the Southern League but declined, accepting that it was clearly no place for amateurs. The club joined the Great Western Suburban League in 1908 in an effort to boost income that local derbies could generate. The club enjoyed its best ever league season in 1908–09, finishing third and further success followed with a second Berks & Bucks Senior Cup triumph. Chesham Generals were beaten 3–0 in the final at Marlow. The match ball still exists today and can be found in current secretary Keith Allen's office! The 1909–10 season saw the club record its all-time record victory, an 18–1 win over Staines with striker Fred Pheby notching seven. The club continued to enjoy life in the Great Western Suburban League and the taste of success in the Berks & Bucks Senior Cup became very familiar with victories in 1910 (a 3–0 replay win over Wokingham Athletic) and 1913 (a 2–1 replay win over Maidenhead Norfolkians). The fourth round of the FA Amateur Cup was also reached in two successive seasons (1910 and 1911).

Events off the pitch soon affected the club. In the autumn and winter of 1913 a major industrial dispute in the furniture trade in High Wycombe saw workers locked out and attendances were seriously affected. However, far more serious events were taking place in Europe and the First World War soon broke out. Wycombe players joined the two companies of Territorials and the Bucks Battalion. Loakes Park was used for training artillerymen and the club ceased to be active for the duration of the war. The club and football began to organise itself again and in the summer of 1919 the club held its AGM at the Red Lion Hotel and all stood for those who had lost their lives in the First World War. They included the following players; Charlie Buchanan, George Buchanan, Pat Carter, Bunny Fowler, Frank Langley, Jock Love, Jim McDermott, Edward Reynolds, A Saunders and Harry Stallwood.

In the addition to competing in the Great Western Suburban League the club also entered the Spartan League. The intention was to field sides of equal strength in both competitions but soon the Spartan League team became the senior side. It was captained by Frank Adams, a local man born in Downley. He joined the club in 1911 and was soon selected for the first team. He left to join Shepherd's Bush at the start of the 1912–13 season but re-joined Wycombe before the end of the year. He started playing as an inside-left before becoming established as an inside-right. After the First World War he made a successful switch to centre-half, although his versatility was one of his many strengths. He led the club to the Spartan League Championship, with the club scoring 114 goals in just 20 league matches. The 1920–21 season in 1921 saw the club do it again, retained its Spartan League title, this time plundering 108 goals. There were also exciting runs in both the FA Cup and FA Amateur Cup, with huge crowds watching the games. The Berks & Bucks Senior Cup was also won again, with a 5–2 victory over Slough in front of 9,875 fans at Elm Park, Reading. In March 1921 the whole town celebrated when the club's application to the Isthmian League was accepted.

=== The amateur years (1921–1974) ===
The Spartan League side had achieved great success and in style too. It featured many wonderful players, including Klon Smith, Tommy Jackman and Reg Boreham. However, the step up to the Isthmian League proved to be a tough one. However, this was amateur football at its finest and this was fully embraced by the club. For the next half a century the club's raison d'etre was to be the greatest Amateur side in the country. The 1920s saw 10 players leave the club to turn professional. In December 1921, perhaps the most successful player was Reg Boreham, who was invited to join Arsenal. He joined the Gunners and was widely credited with saving them from relegation that season. Wycombe finished their inaugural season in the Isthmian League in 8th place (out of 14 teams) and would record a best placed finish of 4th twice (in 1923/24 and 1925/26) during the decade. The Berks & Bucks Senior Cup was won in 1922/23 and 1924/25. In 1923 the stand at Loakes Park was redeveloped, including new changing rooms, at a cost of £1,500. In the summer of 1925 Bernard Charles resigned as secretary which ended a 27-year association with the club. He was important and reliable character at the club and carried on much of the good work began by Charley Harper. In the summer of 1927 chairman George Miles announced that a 50-year lease on Loakes Park had been signed. In February 1929 Frank Adams, aged 37, played his last game for the club; however, his greatest contribution was yet to come.

The 1930s started with the culmination of a dream as the club won the FA Amateur Cup for the only time in its history. London Caledonians, Walthamstow Avenue, Romford and the Metropolitan Police were all defeated as the Chairboys reached the semi-finals. The game was played at Newbury Park, Ilford and a brace from Alf Britnell and a goal from Bill Brown saw the side overcome a robust Woking side 3–0. Wycombe met Hayes in the final, at Highbury on 11 April 1931. 32,489 people watched a tight competitive game that was decided by a single goal with just five minutes remaining. The Wanderers were awarded a penalty for handball but Bill Brown saw his spot-kick saved. Alf Britnell was first to the rebound and buried the ball in the top corner to seal a glorious victory. The team took the famous cup home with them on the London Underground and an estimated crowd of 10,000 saw captain Pat Badrick hold the club aloft and speeches were made before a celebratory dinner for 400 was held at the town hall. Every player except Doug Vernon, an RAF man stationed nearby, lived within a five-mile radius of the town centre, a town with a population of 20,000. The profits from the cup run were used to build a 360' corrugated cover (affectionately known as the cowshed) along the length of the lower side of Loakes Park. It was said that Wycombe Wanderers became the first amateur club to have stands on opposite sides of the ground.

The following season saw the club's attempt to retain the FA Amateur Cup end with a 4–0 third round defeat at Yorkshire Amateurs. Another 4th-place finish in the Isthmian League helped establish the club and more improvements were made to Loakes Park, with enlarged changing rooms complete with tiled baths big enough for a whole team! Even the referee's room now had a bath. The 1932–33 season saw another exciting cup run with history being made in the FA Cup. The Blues saw off Gradwell's Sports Club, Maidenhead United, Park Royal, Slough and Camberley and Yorktown to reach the first round proper for the first time. The club was drawn away to Third Division (South) side Gillingham. A crowd of 6,400 at Priestfield saw the Wanderers go a goal down after the 39th minute to a strike from Liddle. However, the amateurs came back in the second half and Dick Braisher smashed home an equaliser with 15 to go. Despite a goalmouth scramble the Blues held on to take the Gills back to Loakes Park for a replay. The replay was played on the following Wednesday afternoon and despite having to take time off work, 7,597 fans saw the home side recover from conceding a first minute own goal to go 2–1 up only for the professionals to come back and eventually win 4–2.

The 1933–34 season was a disappointing one and the side failed to win a single league game away from home. The following season was even worse and the side had apply for re-election after finishing second from bottom. The club did, however, win the Berks & Bucks Senior Cup again, beating Aylesbury United 3–0 in the final. The worsening results saw the club advertise for a trainer / coach and former Bolton Wanderers player James Seddon was offered the role but refused the terms. The 1935–36 season saw some improvement, with a top half finish, and in 1936–37 the side played nine consecutive cup ties, and a promising FA Amateur Cup was halted by a 4–1 defeat at Stockton. During the 1938–39 campaign Loakes Park was used for Gas Chamber demonstrations as tensions in Europe increased with the Second World War looming. In June 1939 the local military and civil defence began to use the ground, and the stands and changing rooms were taken over the Billeting Authority and the Police. Despite this the 1939–40 Isthmian League began with a 4–0 home win over Woking and a 3–0 FA Cup Extra Preliminary Round win at Hounslow Town but the following day, 3 September 1939, Great Britain declared war on Germany.

Unlike the First World War, the Club remained active during the conflict and played in the Great Western Combination. On Boxing Day 1939, 5,000 people watched Wycombe Wanderers win the Berks & Bucks Emergency Senior Cup beating Wycombe Redfords 4–0 at Loakes Park. During the war the side was captained and run by Jock McCallum, unable to join the war because of a perforated ear drum. He called upon many ex-players and after one game against Slough, the team had to walk the 15 miles back to High Wycombe. In 1944–45 the side became Great Western Combination champions, finishing seven points ahead of Maidenhead United.

After the war football resumed remarkably quickly and the 1945–46 season began with a 4–3 defeat by eventual Champions Walthamstow Avenue at Loakes Park. The Blues finished 9th. The 1946–47 season was one of the most important in the club's history, providing a legacy that has lasted until 2009. Frank Adams began negotiations with Lord Carrington to purchase Loakes Park for the football club. On 19 April 1947 before an Isthmian League game with Corinthian Casuals at Loakes Park, Frank Adams presented the deeds to Club President C P Vine. This single altruistic act secured the future of the club and paved the way for the successes that followed.

The following season saw the side reach the quarter-finals of the FA Amateur Cup for the first time since the competition was won in 1931. Unfortunately the Wanderers crashed 6–2 to a team that would prove to be something of a nemesis in the decade that followed, one that is arguably the greatest amateur club to have played in England and one that shares the varsity colours, namely Bishop Auckland. In 1949–50 the club went one step further, reaching the semi-finals after seeing off Maidenhead United, Bungay Town, Crook Town and Dulwich Hamlet. The Quarter-final tie saw the Blues face St Albans City and a record crowd of 15,850 crammed into Loakes Park. This remains the club's largest ever home attendance. Goals from Jock McCallum (2), Ken Butler and Henri Mikrut earned a 4–1 win. The semi-final was played at Griffin Park, Brentford against Bishop Auckland. 30,453 people and a TV audience watched an exciting game which saw the Bishops take a 2–0 lead. Johnny Way pulled goal back but were denied an equaliser by some fine goalkeeping. The season did finish on a high with the Berks & Bucks Senior Cup being retained after a 1–0 replay win over Slough Town.

The 1950–51 season was a disappointing one and the club decided to employ a full-time coach for the first time. James McCormick was appointed, and the 1951–52 season saw the team reach the quarter-finals of the FA Amateur Cup, losing 2–0 to Barnet at Underhill in front of a record crowd of 11,026 (which still stands today). Wanderers legend Jock McCallum was dropped from the first team soon after McCormick arrived and he moved to Aylesbury United, and knocked the Blues out of the FA Cup, scoring the winning goal in a 2–1 win at Loakes Park. McCormick left at the end of the season, his attempts to modernise the club weren't particularly well received by some. He was replaced by Sid Cann, an appointment that heralded a spell of great success. His first season was a relatively quiet one, but that was followed by a successful season in 1953–54 with a third-place finish in the Isthmian League and another Berks & Bucks Senior Cup triumph, Slough Centre being beaten 3–1 in a replay.

Sid Cann was beginning to build a team that could rightfully challenge for the title of the greatest amateur side in the country. Two young lads made their debuts in 1954 and would go to become legends in their own right. Paul Bates, born in High Wycombe, was a centre-forward, and scored more than 300 goals for the Chairboys. Many of those goals were supplied by Len Worley, born in Chalfont St. Peter, a right-winger who was known as the Stanley Matthews of amateur football. Despite breaking his leg twice, he played as an amateur for both Charlton Athletic and Tottenham Hotspur, but he was at home at Wycombe Wanderers and the fans were very happy to have him. The 1954–55 season saw the Blues embark on another FA Amateur Cup run, Wealdstone, Woking and Ilford were beaten and faced the famous Pegasus team in the quarter-finals. 14,000 at a snow-bound Loakes Park saw the home side do everything but score and the visitors escaped with a goalless draw. The replay at Iffley Road saw the Wanderers come from a goal down to win 2–1 with a last minute winner from Jackie Tomlin. Once again Bishop Auckland stood in Wycombe's way, and the semi-final at Belle Vue, Doncaster, was a tight affair, witnessed by more than 5,000 Wycombe fans. The Bishops missed a 13th-minute penalty but won through to Wembley when Oliver scored the winner with 19 minutes remaining.

The 1955–56 season saw Wanderers reach the first round proper of the FA Cup for only the second time in their history. It started with a 15–1 replay win over Witney Town, after the first game ended goalless. It ended with a 3–1 defeat by Burton Albion in front of 9,696 at Loakes Park. On New Year's Eve 1955 Wycombe went top of the Isthmian League with a 6–2 thrashing of Romford and they stayed at the top of the tree until 21 April 1956, when 6,000 fans at Loakes Park cheered a 3–0 win over Dulwich Hamlet that secured the club first ever Isthmian League title. It had been a long wait, and it was achievement that was celebrated even more for that fact. But it wasn't to end there, the following season ended in more glory as Wycombe retained the title, secured with a 3–2 win at home to Corinthian Casuals on the last day of the season.

Even greater excitement had preceded it as the club made it to the FA Amateur Cup final at Wembley. St Albans City, Clapton and Hounslow Town were beaten and Ilford were the opponents for the quarter-final at East London sides Newbury Park ground. 5,000 Wycombe fans travelled in torrential rain, and the pitch was a quagmire but the game went on. They watched a see-saw game that ended in a 3–3 draw and the replay a week later at Loakes Park saw 15,500 people squeeze in to see the home side win 2–0. The semi-final was played at Highbury, scene of the club's 1931 triumph and opponents Corinthian Casuals contributed fully to an incredible tussle, which enraptured the 28,197 crowd. Norman Kerruish gave Casuals a first-minute lead, but Paul Bates header home an equaliser just three minutes later. He gave the Blues the lead on 20 minutes but Jack Laybourne made it 2–2 on the half hour. Wycombe Captain Frank Westley hobbled off on the hour and were soon down to nine men when Frank Smith dislocated his shoulder. Goalkeeper Dennis Syrett then injured himself when he collided with a post. Westley returned to play on the wing, and his incredible strength and determination helped galvanise the team. With twenty minutes to go Paul Bates crossed for Len Worley to head home. With five minutes left Worley was put in on goal and he fired home to give the Wanderers a magnificent 4–2 win.

A crowd of 90,000, the largest a Wycombe team has ever played in front of, was at Wembley, with more than 15,000 from High Wycombe, to watch the final on 13 April 1957. The opponents were, predictably, Bishop Auckland. Both sides kit colours clashed and were both obliged to change according to the rules. Both chose their red change colours, and Wycombe won the toss, with the Bishops choosing to wear white shirts with black shorts. They were still the hot-favourites and took the lead on 13 minutes through William Russell. The Wanderers managed to withstand more pressure and slowly fought their way back. On 38 minutes Wycombe grabbed an equaliser, Frank Smith fired home after a neat dummy. Unfortunately parity lasted just two minutes, Derek Lewin poking home from close range. The Wanderers came out in the second half and only Bishops goalkeeper Harry Sharratt denied them an equaliser, brilliantly saving from Worley and then stopping a Bates header. Bishop Auckland grabbed a decisive third goal on 71 minutes when Warren Bradley found the net through a crowd of players. A 3–1 defeat was hard to take but it was fair result. Thousands lined the streets of High Wycombe to greet the returning team and each player took a bow on the portico of the Red Lion Hotel.

Maintaining such a high level of success was always going to be difficult and so it proved. A third successive title was just out reach, the Blues finishing as runners-up, four points behind Tooting & Mitcham United. The Berks & Bucks Senior Cup was won again, Maidenhead United beaten 1–0 at Oak Tree Road, Marlow. The FA Cup first round proper was reached again, but Northampton Town scored two late goals to win 2–0 at the County Ground. An unbeaten 12-match start to the league season wasn't enough as Wimbledon stormed to the title, the Blues finishing third. In 1959–60, yet more history was made as the club reached the second round proper of the FA Cup for the first time, beating Wisbech Town 4–2. They were rewarded with a local derby against Watford, and 23,907 saw the Blues eventually 5–1 at Vicarage Road. There was another runners-up finish in the league, and Maidenhead United were defeated again in the Berks & Bucks Senior Cup final, this time a 3–0 win at Elm Park, Reading.

As the decades changed, so did the team and its fortunes. Many stalwarts left the club and the 1960–61 was a disappointing one, with the side finishing in 8th place. Coach Sid Cann left in the summer to return to the Football League with Norwich City. He was replaced by Colin McDonald in August 1961 but resigned in September for "domestic reasons." He was succeeded by Graham Adams. The 1961–62 season saw the debut of a young Tony Horseman, who played on the left-wing and scored in a 3–2 defeat at Oxford City. At the end of the season Adams left and Don Welsh became the new coach. The season was notable due to the severe winter and the team played just once between Boxing Day 1962 and 5 March 1963. It also saw Dave Bassett appear for the Blues. The team strip was changed for the 1963–64 season from quarters to stripes, traditionally worn by the reserve side. It was, however, an unpopular choice and quarters were reinstated the following year. On 25 September 1963, the match between Wycombe Wanderers and Enfield saw floodlights used for the first time at Loakes Park. Goalkeeper John Maskell made his debut for the side at the start of the 1964–65 season but suffered the misfortune of breaking his ankle in a 7–0 FA Cup tie defeat at Hayes. Results weren't any better in the league and after a 9–2 defeat at Hendon in December Coach Don Welsh resigned and former player Barry Darvill took over.

The team slowly managed to improve under Darvill and league campaign during the 1965–66 season ended with more than 100 goals scored through the deadly trio of Paul Bates, Tony Horseman and Keith Samuels. Guildford City denied the side a trip to Loftus Road to play Queens Park Rangers in the FA Cup in a 1–0 replay win at Loakes Park and Hendon ended a FA Amateur Cup at the quarter-final stage with a 2–1 win at Claremont Road. Results continued to improve and in 1966–67 the team finished in third place. Tony Horseman scored a sensational 60 goals in just 51 first team appearances during the campaign. There was also an extraordinary first round F.A. Cup tie with Bedford Town that went to three replays, eventually won 3–2 by the home side at the Eyrie. It was also the season when the substitute was introduced in English football and on 24 September 1966 Martin Priestley had the honour when he replaced an injured John Maskell during a 4–1 home win over Barking The 1967–68 season saw Paul Bates play his last game for the Wanderers and the team struggled. Despite another Berks & Bucks Senior Cup victory, a 3–2 win over Slough Town at the Meadow, Chesham, the most notable result was a hugely embarrassing 1–0 defeat in the FA Amateur Cup to City of Norwich School Old Boys.

In December 1968 Barry Darvill resigned and the club approached Brian Lee, upon a recommendation from the Football Association. Brian Lee was appointed in December and took charge of his first game on 28 December 1968, a 0–0 draw at Clapton Lee's appointed was a real watershed moment for the club and within a month Lee was picking the team and the Selection Committee was disbanded. Lee's impact was even greater, and he started to rebuild the team in the summer of 1969. The reserve side was disbanded, due to limited resources. The quartered kit were also changed, the side wearing plain Cambridge blue shirts and Oxford blue shorts. Geoff Anthony, Peter Suddaby, John Delaney, Johnny Hutchinson and Keith Searle all joined the club and the side finished as runners-up in the league to Enfield Wanderers legend Len Worley played his last game for the club, as a substitute in a 1–0 win at Croydon Amateurs on 13 December 1969. He played 512 games for Wycombe, scoring 67 goals. Ted Powell, Larry Pritchard and Paul Fuschillo joined the club in the summer of 1970 and a hugely talented team won the club's third Isthmian League title, pipping Sutton United to the Championship by just one point. The quarter-finals of the FA Amateur Cup were reached again, but Skelmersdale United stunned at 10,203 crowd winning 3–0 at Loakes Park. The title was retained the following season as the side flew out of the traps, losing just one of its first 22 league matches, scored 102 goals in 40 games. The club was, however, determined to repeat its one and only FA Amateur Cup triumph and Aveley, Spennymoor United, Walton and Hersham and Hayes were beaten as the Blues reached the semi-final. It was played at Griffin Park, Brentford, scene of defeat in the semi-final of 1950. The opponents this time were Isthmian League rivals Hendon Wycombe were missing the influential Larry Pritchard through injury. The majority of the 9,210 crowd travelled from High Wycombe and they were aghast to see the Dons take the lead against the run of play after 14 minutes. Johnny Hutchinson equalised on 60 minutes but Hendon grabbed a winner with a lon-range shot that stood despite appeals that a Hendon player was in an offside position.

The 1972–73 season was one of relative disappointment as the side could only finish in 4th place. The season ended with the departure of captain John Delaney who turned professional with AFC Bournemouth. Terry Reardon and Keith Mead joined in the summer and their battling qualities complimented the skillful players already in the team. It paid off as the side regained the Isthmian League title, remaining unbeaten at Loakes Park. The Isthmian League had expanded, and the league gained a sponsor, being renamed Rothmans Isthmian League Division One. Yet more excitement came in the FA Cup as the side battling through the qualifying rounds to face Newport County in the first round. A brace from Steve Perrin and one from Dylan Evans secured a 3–1 win and history was made, for it was the club's first ever victory over a Football League team. The run was ended in the second round, as Peterborough United won 3–1 at Loakes Park. There was some disappointment as the club's last attempt to win the FA Amateur Cup was foiled by a 2–1 defeat at Blyth Spartans, the winner coming from a Keith Mead own goal.

=== The loss of purpose (1974–1984) ===
Amateurism was abolished by the Football Association in the summer of 1974. The players now became "semi-professionals." This change had little effect on the club at first. In fact the 1974–75 season was one of the greatest it had enjoyed. It started in inglorious fashion as the club forgot to send in the qualifying round exemption form and had to battle through to the first round proper of the FA Cup. They faced Cheltenham Town and a 3–1 win at Loakes Park was sealed by a solo run by right-back Paul Birdseye. The club was drawn at home to AFC Bournemouth in the second round, and former captain John Delaney returned and his side escaped with a 0–0 draw. The replay at Dean Court saw the Blues trail 1–0 at half-time but a roasting from Brian Lee saw the side come out and Tony Horseman soon grabbed an equaliser. It was Horseman again who fired in a shot which cannoned off teammate Steve Perrin and into the net to give the Wanderers a 2–1 victory. The club had made history again, reaching the third round of the FA Cup for the first time. The opposition were to be first division Middlesbrough, then top of the table and managed by Jack Charlton. The game at Loakes Park was covered by London Weekend Television's Big Match cameras and Boro scraped a 0–0 draw. The side travelled up to Ayresome Park for the replay and a 30,128 crowd saw the semi-pros hold out until the last minute when David Armstrong slipped the ball past Maskell and into the bottom corner of the net. Middlesbrough's players applauded the Wycombe players off the pitch and the home crowd chanted "Wycombe, Wycombe." The Boro Chairman provided a case of Champagne to the gallant losers. Understandably, the run had taken its toll on the team and they were well off the pace in the league, 16 points behind Enfield with just a single game in hand. However, showing great determination they slowly reined in their title rivals, winning nine on the bounce and even had the chance to go top with just four games to go in a title decider but a tense game ended 0–0. It all came down to the final day of the season with the Wanderers at home to third placed Dagenham 3,800 people braved a cold and wet day to watch a nervy game and with five minutes to go it looked like they were destined to miss out. Striker Keith Searle decided that destiny still needed to be written and when he received the ball from a throw-in he turned and smashed in a shot from the corner of the penalty area. The ball flew into the top far corner of the net and the terrace behind the goal at the Gasworks End erupted in ecstasy. Wycombe held on to win 1–0 and retained the title with a superior goal difference of 0.1. There was some controversy in the Berks & Bucks Senior Cup when after a 4–0 extra time victory over Thatcham Town at the Meadow, Chesham, the side refused to collect their winners medal and cup in protest at the Berks & Bucks F.A's refusal to allow the club to compete in the London Senior Cup.

The summer of 1975 saw the side begin to break-up. The abolition of amateur football saw other top non-league clubs pay players more than Wycombe could reasonably afford. Alan Phillips, Gary Hand, Steve Perrin and Keith Searle all left the club. Searle's loss was particularly galling as he joined rivals Enfield and they finished five points ahead in the league as the Wanderers finished the 1975–76 season as runners-up. They did reach the second round of the FA Cup after another marathon tie against Bedford Town, eventually winning the second replay 2–1. They were rewarded with a trip to Ninian Park to play Cardiff City and lost 1–0. There was an enjoyable two-legged final tie in the Anglo-Italian Trophy, and after a 1–0 defeat by AC Monza in Italy, the return leg saw goals from John Delaney and Dylan Evans seal a 2–1 aggregate win. In November 1975 Brian Lee announced he was to resign as manager at the end of the season. It marked the end of an era.

Lee recommended former player Ted Powell as his replacement but he left in March 1977 after accepting a coaching job in Malawi. The 1976–77 season saw the side finish as runners-up to Enfield again. Much of the side's goals were provided by Ian Pearson who plundered 29 goals before leaving to join Millwall at the end of the campaign. The team also made the second round of the FA Cup again, and faced local rivals Reading at a frosty Loakes Park. Reading icon Robin Friday scored as the Royals took a 2–0 goal lead and Pearson nearly secured a replay after scoring a consolation goal before hitting a post. John Reardon took over from Powell as manager and continued for the following season. The side finished third in the league, now renamed the Premier Division and were surprisingly beaten 2–0 in the first round of the FA Cup at Minehead. Tony Horseman retired at the end of the season, having scored 416 goals in 746 games.

Andy Williams took over as manager at the start of the 1978–79 season but the side could only muster a sixth-place finish. The 1979–80 saw more upheaval as the Alliance Premier League was formed. Designed to be the pinnacle of non-league football, the Isthmian League refused to join the pyramid structure. Wycombe Wanderers were invited to join the league but declined the offer as the idea of a national league, with increased travelling costs, was an unattractive one. Williams left and Brian Lee returned to take temporary charge of the team. In January 1980, Mike Keen took over as manager with the team languishing in the bottom half of the league. He guided the team to a 10th-place finish. For many years, the club's objective was to be the best amateur club in the country. The competition that replaced the FA Amateur Cup, the FA Trophy had seen the club slip to defeats in the early rounds and towards the end of the 1980–81 season Brian Lee, who had recently been elected as Chairman, applied for the club to join the Football League. It was partly as a protest against the Alliance Premier League's assertion that only their Champions could apply but he also wanted to see whether Loakes Park would pass the Ground Inspection test and the ground duly passed, with one or two minor modifications. The point having been made, Wycombe withdrew their application before the Football League's AGM. On the pitch the side improved and secured a third place league finish and the club reinstated its reserve team after an eleven-year absence.

The 1981–82 season began with the death of Frank Adams in September, aged 90. Manager Mike Keen again led the side to a third-placed finish in the Isthmian League Premier Division. The league had decided to join the pyramid and its champions would qualify for promotion. Wycombe were offered the opportunity to join the Alliance Premier League but again declined the invitation. The season would best be remembered for finally getting to grips with the F.A. Trophy, with a run to the semi-finals, seeing off Walthamstow Avenue, Hyde United, old rivals Bishop Auckland and Kidderminster Harriers along the way. Altrincham stood in the way of a return to Wembley. The first leg was played at Moss Lane and Ken Wilson gave the Blues a first half lead. Wycombe conceded a goal in the last minute and the side had to settle for a 1–1 draw. The second leg at Loakes Park was watched by 4,896. First choice goalkeeper Gary Lester was missing through injury and the team lost by 3 goals to nil.

Mike Keen strengthened the side in the summer of 1982 with the arrival of Mark Hill and the return of Steve Perrin. Mike's son, Kevin, also appeared for the first team before joining West Ham United. Another FA Cup first round appearance ended in a 1–0 defeat by Bristol Rovers at Eastville. The team went top of the table in October and stayed there for the rest of the season. The side remained unbeaten for the last ten games of the season to secure the club seventh Isthmian League title. Yet again the club declined promotion to the Alliance Premier League and attendances soon began to drop, as the perceived lack of ambition together with the hooliganism of the early 1980s proved to be an unglamorous combination. The 1983–84 season was something of a nadir as the side finished 7th in the league and lost the Hitachi League Cup final to Sutton United. A crowd of just 349 watched a 2–1 home league defeat by Harlow Town in April 1984. At the end of the season the club decided not to offer Mike Keen a new contract.

=== The Football League dream (1984–1993) ===
Paul Bence was appointed as the new manager and began a rebuilding process bringing in strikers Simon Read and Declan Link from Staines Town. The Hitachi League Cup was won, Farnborough Town being beaten 5–1 over two legs. The side recovered from a slow start in the league to finish third, losing just three of their last 21 games. Champions Sutton United and runners-up Worthing were unable to go into the Gola League and Wycombe finally took the gamble and accepted the invitation to play in a national league for the first time in the club's history. It proved to be a struggle but the team found its feet and held its own until the last two months of the season. An FA Cup run played its part, as Wycombe Wanderers faced Fourth Division Colchester United in the first round. A game that was marred by crowd trouble saw Mark West give the Blues a third-minute lead and Simon read scored a second to seal a 2–0 victory. It was the game that began an unusual rivalry between two clubs who were more than 100 miles apart. The second round pitted the U's neighbours Chelmsford City against the Blues, and another 2–0 victory at Loakes Park saw more crowd trouble. The third round draw was rather unkind and an away tie at York City saw Wycombe's opponents win 2–0. Two crucial factors during the season were the loss of striker Declan Link who left in November to work in the United States and the resignation of Manager Paul Bence in January, due to his business responsibilities. His assistant Alan Gane took over but were unable to halt the slide and the team lost eleven of the last 14 league games. It the penultimate home game of the season the team held Altrincham to goalless draw, left-back Graham Pearce lobbed the ball over his own goalkeeper from 30 yards and into the net. Even worse was to follow when on the final Saturday of the season Wycombe drew 0–0 at home to Kettering Town. Yet their fate wasn't sealed until the following day when relegation rivals Dagenham travelled to FA Trophy finalists Runcorn Dagenham's goalkeeper scored from a wind assisted goal kick in the opening minute. Despite a Runcorn equaliser in the second half the Daggers held onto a point and condemned Wycombe to the first relegation in their history, on goal difference and on equal points with three other clubs.

There were also significant changes off the pitch during the season. Chairman Brian Lee had concluded that Loakes Park would not pass a ground inspection if the club were ever to seek promotion to the Football League and that there wasn't sufficient space or funding to redevelop the ground. The club entered into an agreement with a property company to fund the building of a new stadium and when the club had made the move, acquire Loakes Park for redevelopment. The ground wasn't owned by the football club, but held in trust. The trustees agreed that Loakes Park could be sold with the future of the club dependent on moving. Brian Lee also felt it would be too great an undertaking for the current Committee and approached local builder and developer Ivor Beeks and persuaded him to become involved in the project. In October 1986 Wycombe Wanderers Football Club Limited was activated and all the assets of the football club were transferred to it. The trustees also handed Loakes Park over to the new company.

The new board increased the club's weekly wage bill at manager Alan Gane's request as the club sought to bounce straight back to the Gola League. New signings arrived including Kevin Durham and the sensational signing of Keith Barrett and Noel Ashford, both from Enfield, for a combined fee of £9,000. Ashford soon established himself as a cult figure at Loakes Park and was nicknamed "God". The Blues won their first eight league games and it was soon clear that it would be a two horse race for the title with rivals Yeovil Town. There were two embarrassing cup defeats, a 5–1 thrashing at home to VS Rugby in the FA Cup and a 1–0 replay defeat at Leatherhead in the FA Trophy. However, there were two pieces of good news over the holiday period. Yeovil Town boss Gerry Gow resigned and former striker Declan Link returned from the United States. Despite a 1–0 defeat by Yeovil Town at Loakes Park, a game played in a violent atmosphere, the Wanderers closed in on the title and won the final seven games of the season to win their eighth, and final, Isthmian League Championship and promotion back to the GM Vauxhall Conference. They did it winning 32 of their 42 league matches, earning 101 points and scoring 103 goals.

The joy of a return to the GM Vauxhall Conference was soon replaced by dismay when Alan Gane resigned after falling out with the new board. Gane wanted to sign some of the top players in non-league football but Chairman Brian Lee rejected the proposals as he was concerned that the wage bill would spiral out of control. Former player Peter Suddaby was appointed as Gane's replacement and a 4–0 defeat at home to Stafford Rangers on the opening day was a sign of things to come. Worse was to follow when iconic striker Noel Ashford was sold to Barnet for a then record non-league fee of £17,000. Dismay soon turned to disgust as local rivals Aylesbury United knocked the Blues out of the FA Cup in the first qualifying round, winning 2–0 at Buckingham Road. The nadir followed when Ashford returned to Loakes Park with Barnet and humiliated the home side with a 7–0 thrashing. Things improved slightly and the team hovered just above the relegation zone but a 5–1 thrashing at the hands of Maidstone United at Loakes Park on 2 January 1988 was the final straw. The club asked for the managers resignation and Peter Suddaby fell on his sword. The board came up with a short-list of two men for the vacancy, Jim Kelman and Martin O'Neill. Only two of the seven directors voted for O'Neill and Jim Kelman was the surprise choice. His first game in charge was a thrilling 5–3 win at home to Cheltenham Town and it proved to be a real catalyst as the new boss slowly guided the team to 18th place, nine points clear of relegation.

The 1988–89 season was surprisingly successful as Kelman built a side that achieved the club's highest-ever league finish, fourth in the GM Vauxhall Conference. There was even hopes of the championship in the spring of 1989 and 4,239 people saw the Wanderers beat Kidderminster Harriers 1–0 at Loakes Park, the largest attendance for more than a dozen years. That attendance was eclipsed a couple of months later when 4,890 witnessed Kettering Town steal a 1–0 win, the biggest Conference crowd that season. It was a result that put paid to any hopes of winning the league. They were also hopes of another Wembley visit in the FA Trophy, but 1,000 travelling Chairboys saw their dreams come crashing down on the plastic pitch of Hyde United, who created a shock by winning 1–0. Kelman had brought in players like Andy Robinson, Martin Blackler, Steve Abbley, Matt Crossley, John Kerr, Andy Kerr and Glyn Creaser, who cost £15,000 from Barnet After the devastating blow of defeat by Hyde, Kelman pulled off a transfer coup, signing the highly rated Barnet striker Nicky Evans for a non-league record fee of £32,000. Evans scored a brace on his debut against Boston United and hopes were high that the club could push on and challenge for the Football League again the following season. Kelman made more astute signings, bringing in Simon Stapleton and Steve Guppy. The team's results and performances were inconsistent. High-flying Barnet were beaten 1–0 and a 3–0 deficit at home to Kidderminister Harriers was turned around in dramatic fashion when John Kerr's diving header snatched a 3–3 draw five minutes from time. On the flip side Cheltenham Town handed out a 4–0 thrashing at Loakes Park and the team was hit for four again at Telford United. It was a hugely embarrassing 3–1 defeat at Loakes Park in the FA Trophy by the Metropolitan Police that heralded the end of Jim Kelman's reign. The cup exit played its part but the managers relationship with the board had been deteriorating for some time and Kelman handed in his resignation. Kelman's legacy would be there for all to see as his successor would build his historic side out of many of the players brought to the club by Kelman.

His successor was Martin O'Neill, the man rejected by the board last time out. He almost wasn't appointed this time either. He hadn't applied for the vacancy as he hadn't seen it advertised and Kenny Swain had been interviewed and was offered the job. Swain turned the position down after being promoted to assistant to Dario Gradi at Crewe Alexandra. O'Neill was only alerted to the job by new Wycombe director Alan Parry, who he bumped into purely by chance in the toilets at Carrow Road whilst both men were commentating on an FA Cup tie between Norwich City and Liverpool. O'Neill applied and after coming down to Adams Park, the building of which was in its advanced stages, he was unanimously offered the job. His first game in charge was a 1–1 draw at Merthyr Tydfil He soon made his presence felt, abolishing some of the traditions still around from the club's amateur days. He also showed his authority by dropping right-back Steve Abbley, a strong influence in the dressing room. He soon guided the team to mid-table security, even winning away at Champions Darlington and in doing so winning the Manager of the Month award. He also won his first trophy, a 2–1 extra time win against Slough Town in the Berks & Bucks Senior Cup at Hungerford Town's Bulpit Lane.

The summer of 1990 was a significant one in the club's history, and one which brought about many of the changes which paved the way for a future in the Football League. After 95 years at Loakes Park, the club moved to their new ground at Adams Park. Loakes Park had become a real home, which everyone, from players to supporters, had become extremely fond of.

The new ground was named after Frank Adams, who helped it become a reality. The move also provided the financial base for the manager to build a team capable of achieving the club's dream of promotion to the Football League. Such an achievement wasn't going to be easy and Martin O'Neill started to add to the team he'd been left with. Keith Ryan was signed from Berkhamsted Town and Simon Hutchinson joined from Eastwood Town for £7,000.

Popular midfielder Kevin Durham left for Barnet for £15,000, helping his new club win promotion to the Football League in the coming season but dying suddenly shortly afterwards, before he had the chance to make his Football League debut.

It was an exciting season from almost the first whistle, although the FA Cup run was almost stopped its tracks by Trowbridge Town who led 1–0 in a second qualifying round replay going into the last minute only for Nicky Evans to head home a priceless equaliser before snatching a sensational winning in the final minute of extra-time, beating two defenders before curling the ball home from twenty yards. After seeing off fellow Conference side Boston United 4–0 in a replay the Wanderers were drawn at home to Peterborough United in the second round. The original tie was snowed off and was the scene of a famous photograph taken by Stuart Clarke of BBC commentator John Motson stood on the snowbound pitch in his trademark sheepskin coat. The game was played on the following Wednesday evening and Posh goalkeeper Carl Bradshaw pulled off a series of incredible saves to deny the Blues, and in particular Nicky Evans. Martin Blackler finally found a way past him with a deflected shot but sub Paul Culpin snatched an equaliser to take it to a replay at London Road, which the Fourth Division side won 2–0.

The league campaign was no less exciting, Mark West scored four goals in a 5–1 trouncing of runaway leaders Kettering Town, who had previously gone 15 games unbeaten. Mark West repeated the feat six weeks later, with Sutton United the victims. The new year saw Nicky Evans return to his former club Barnet for £28,750 after requesting a transfer. he was replAced firstly by Mickey Nuttell, a £6,000 signing from Cheltenham Town and then by Keith Scott, from Lincoln City, who eventually cost £30,000. Wanderers spent most of the season in fifth place and did the double over Kettering Town and arguably denied them the league title, as they did Colchester United, from whom they took four points.

The greatest excitement was in the FA Trophy, where Wealdstone, VS Rugby, Cheltenham Town and Northwich Victoria were seen off en route to the semi-finals. The draw wasn't particularly kind, pitting them against Altrincham, who had hit an amazing run of form, and were pushing for the Conference title. The first leg at Adams Park saw Alty take an early lead which was quickly cancelled out by a Dave Carroll equaliser. Keith Scott poached a winning goal with 18 minutes remaining and a lead was taken into the second leg at Moss Lane. It proved to be a nervous affair, Wycombe were desperate to make a return to Wembley, and take revenge for being denied that prize nine years previously by the same opponents. A tense first half ended in stalemate and just before the hour Mark West poked home from a corner to give the Wanderers a crucial lead. The home side lost their heads and were soon down ten men and in the last minute Keith Scott wrapped up a 4–1 aggregate win from the penalty spot. The Wanderers were back at Wembley and the celebrations went long into the night. Nearly 25,000 Wycombe fans travelled to Wembley, and were part of a record 34,842 crowd for a FA Trophy final at the old stadium. Keith Scott gave the Blues the lead and Kidderminster Harriers goalkeeper Paul Jones kept his team in it with a string of stunning saves. Just before the hour Dave Hadley's daisy cutter slipped under Wanderers goalkeeper John Granville, who played the game with a broken thumb. Wycombe weren't going to be denied as less than ten minutes later Keith Scott broke down the right wing and crossed for local hero Mark West to dive low and head in the winner! It was a fitting end to a sensational season. Average crowds at Adams Park rose from 1,800 to 2,800 and Mark West was crowned Conference Player of the Season after scoring 34 goals. Wycombe were looking more and more like a club who would be in the Football League before much longer.

The summer of 1991 saw the club installed as favourites for the Conference title alongside Colchester United. There was some very sad news when former player Kevin Durham died suddenly aged only 29. Wycombe's share of the gate receipts from the Conference Championship shield against his club Barnet were donated to a fund for his young son.

Martin O'Neill made two hugely influential signings, bringing in defender Jason Cousins from Brentford and goalkeeper Paul Hyde, a £15,000 signing from Hayes The season started with seven successive wins but it all came crashing down in September with two successive home defeats. The first, a 1–0 reverse to Macclesfield Town was surrounded in controversy after John Timmons scored the winner after handling the ball. Both Mickey Nuttell and Jason Cousins were sent off and referee Royston Osbourne had been escorted from the pitch. Disaster was to follow a week later when title rivals Colchester United made the journey to Buckinghamshire in dreadful conditions. In driving rain and gale-force winds, and an ugly atmosphere which saw Police on horseback on the pitch, the visitors took an early second half lead through Nicky Smith but were soon pegged back by a Steve Guppy equaliser. The game seemed destined for a draw when in the last minute Colchester goalkeeper Scott Barrett's goal kick caught on the wind, bounced once over Hyde and into the top corner of the net. It was a massive blow but Martin O'Neill's men recovered and kept pace with their full-time adversaries. The return match in December was also one to forget, with the U's winning 3–0.

The Blues went into the new year behind in points but with games in hand and despite disappointing cup exits at home to Kettering Town and Witton Albion, they continued the fight for the Championship. O'Neill signed some much sought after players, striker Kim Casey joined from Cheltenham Town for £9,000, Dennis Greene arrived for £15,000 from Chelmsford City and the real coup of local-rivals Slough Town tailsman Steve Thompson for £25,000. In April, the Blues caught up in matches played and even overtook Colchester at the top of the league, but a 3–1 defeat at Macclesfield Town would prove costly. A 2–1 aggregate win over Runcorn saw the club win more silverware in the Bob Lord Trophy but the big prize was still up for grabs. An 86th minute at Gateshead from Keith Scottlooked to have put the Blues back on top of the league, but Colchester had snatched a late equaliser in a 4–4 draw at Macclesfield Town. The Wanderers were level on points with their Essex rivals, and despite a 5–0 thrashing away at Redbridge Forest, they were behind on goal difference going into the final day. A 4–0 thrashing of Witton Albion at Adams Park wasn't enough as Colchester United beat Barrow 5–0 to take the title with a nine better goal difference, both clubs having a then record conference tally of 94 points. It was a crashing disappointment and there was a failed summer campaign for the club to replace Aldershot, who had gone out of business. As the following season was getting underway, another fourth tier club, Maidstone United, went the same way as Aldershot, but the Football League quickly dismissed any suggestion of Wycombe being admitted to the league at this late stage.

Martin O'Neill kept faith with the team that had come so close to promotion and the 1992–93 season started in similar fashion to the last one, with the side winning nine league games in a row. An exciting tie took place in the second round of the FA Cup, with the Blues drawn at home to Ossie Ardiles' Third Division side West Bromwich Albion. A stunning fightback, live on Sky TV, saw goals from Glyn Creaser and Steve Thompson take the Baggies back to the Hawthorns. The replay was also shown live, and an amazing 4,500 Wycombe fans made the journey to the black country. They saw Keith Scott hit a post before Bob Taylor snatched a goal winner just nine minutes from time. Even in injury-time the Wanderers came agonisingly close to snatching an equaliser, Steve Guppy just inches from connecting with a Simon Hutchinson cross.

Wycombe were now homing in on the Football League, and as the season progressed it became more and more certain that the Football League dream was about to become reality, and league football was finally going to come to the county of Buckinghamshire for the first time.

=== The Football League (1993–2004) ===
Inspirational captain Glyn Creaser suffered a bad injury to his foot and when the side went on a run of four games without a win in February and March 1993, local rivals Slough Town came within four points of the Blues, having played two games more. The sides met at Adams Park and a then record crowd of 7,230, with many more locked out, saw a tense game that was decided by a 27th winner from Keith Scott. Wanderers had to play most of the second half with ten men when Andy Kerr was sent off, but some determined defending and fine goalkeeping from Paul Hyde ensured the three points. Martin O'Neill signed striker Tim Langford from Telford United for £15,000 and the sides went on another run in the FA Trophy. Wins over Cheltenham Town, Morecambe, Bromsgrove Rovers and Gateshead led the club to semi-final with Sutton United, managed by former boss Alan Gane. The U's sprung a great shock by winning the first leg at Adams Park 3–2. The tie was missed by Keith Scott through injury and he even took to an oxygen chamber to get fit for the second leg. The tension was palpable as more than half the 5,002 crowd at Gander Green Lane travelled to support the Blues. Keith Scott was declared fit and after a number of missed chances, centre-back Matt Crossley headed home from a corner and immediate sunk to his knees with a mixture of joy and relief. The visitors came out in the second half and grabbed the tie by the throat. On 48 minutes Keith Scott headed home from a Guppy corner and three minutes later Matt Crossley swept home another corner, this time from Dave Carroll, to make it 3–0. Keith Scott was replaced by Mark West with 15 minutes and within three minutes with his first touch he crossed for Dave Carroll to finish emphatically to make it 4–0. The 6–3 aggregate win saw the Blues go back to Wembley and the pitch was engulfed by celebrating fans at the final whistle. The following week there was even more celebrations, after a 1–1 draw with nearest challengers Slough Town, a 5–1 thrashing of Runcorn at Adams Park, including a sensational solo goal from Steve Guppy, saw the Wanderers all but seal promotion to the Football League.

One trophy did prove elusive as Northwich Victoria came to Adams Park and won the Drinkwise Cup 3–2 in extra time. The FA Trophy final at Wembley saw 28,000 Wycombe fans make the short journey to face Runcorn where Jason Cousins smashed home a free-kick after just two minutes and Andy Kerr headed home a second 20 minutes later. Steve Shaughnessy pulled a goal back for the Linnets just before half-time. Just before the hour mark Steve Thompson headed home a Steve Guppy corner to make it 3–1 and Wycombe missed a number of chances to extend their lead. Dave Carroll made it 4–1 with a minute left when Runcorn goalkeeper Arthur Williams allowed his shot to slip through his fingers. There was a wonderful gesture as injured captain Glyn Creaser went up to collect the trophy. Wycombe Wanderers had achieved a non-league double and there were more scenes of celebration in the town the following day as the team enjoyed an open-top bus parade.

One potential cloud on the horizon was the interest of Nottingham Forest in manager Martin O'Neill. The crowd chanted "Don't go Martin, don't go." The following day he travelled to Nottingham. Wycombe Chairman Ivor Beeks countered the offer with a new contract, with a significant salary increase and on the Wednesday morning a press conference at Adams Park informed an overjoyed town that Martin O'Neill was staying. The Irishman explained that the reaction he'd received from the Wycombe crowd had swayed him and that he still had this "nonsensical dream" of taking the club up to the Premier League.

As he did the previous summer, O'Neill kept faith in his squad. Just three of his players, Glyn Creaser, Mark West and Steve Thompson remained part-time as the club full-time for the first time in its history. The Football League imposed very stringent financial conditions on the club, after the recent demise of Maidstone United and the near demise of Barnet following their recent arrivals in the league. The fixture list was also rather unhelpful, as the opening fixture of the 1993–94 season would be away at Carlisle United. However, more than 1,500 Chairboys and girls made the long journey and were part of a 7,752 crowd that witnessed history in the making. The newcomers endured a torrid opening 20 minutes, Rod Thomas giving the Cumbrians the lead. However, the Wanderers soon found their feet and equalised three minutes before half-time. The first Football League goal in the club's history was an own-goal scored by Chris Curran: with 18 minutes Steve Guppy became the first Wycombe player to score in the Football League when he turned the ball home at the far post; however, Curran made up for his error ten minutes later by firing home an equaliser and the game finished 2–2. A Keith Scott goal gave the Blues their first ever victory in the Football League, a 1–0 win over Chester City at Adams Park. The league newcomers made a great start, remaining unbeaten in their first eight league matches. After beating Leyton Orient 3–0 on aggregate in the first round of the Football League Cup the team came agonisingly close to knocking out Premier League Coventry City in the second round. A 3–0 first leg deficit was overturned and a Jason Cousins free-kick gave the Wanderers a 4–0 lead early in extra time. Goals from Steve Morgan and a deflected Phil Babb effort saw the Sky Blues through 5–4 on aggregate.

In the FA Cup the team again beat two sides from the league above, winning 2–1 at Bristol Rovers and 1–0 at home to Cambridge United. The tie at Twerton Park would be striker Keith Scott's last game, he signed for Premier League Swindon Town for an eventual fee of £375,000. His replacement was Tony Hemmings, signed earlier in the season from Northwich Victoria and he made an immediate impact, scoring twice in a 3–1 home win over promotion rivals Crewe Alexandra. The following weekend the club travelled up to another promotion rival, Preston North End. Their Deepdale ground still had a plastic pitch (the last remaining one in the league) and they were managed by John Beck. Two goals from Tim Langford were cancelled out but a last minute strike from Hakan Hayrettin, his only goal for Wycombe, from just inside the Preston half stunned the home crowd and sent the visiting fans in delirium. Premier League Norwich City ended interest in the FA Cup, winning the third-round tie at Adams Park 2–0. There was still another cup run to be had in the Associate Members Cup. The Southern Area Quarter-final at Craven Cottage saw 2,500 Wycombe fans make the short trip into the capital to see Tim Langford notch a brace in a 2–2 draw. The game went to penalties and Jason Cousins tucked home the winning spot-kick to spark more celebrations. The game marked the debut of striker Simon Garner, who soon become a cult hero at Adams Park. Victory did come at a cost, centre-back Terry Evans was injured and missed the rest of the season.

A tricky run in February ended with a fortunate last minute winner from Langford at Gillingham and March saw the side push on for automatic promotion. A 2–0 win at Layer Road against rivals Colchester United was particularly sweet, with defender David Titterton scoring his one and only Wycombe goal. O'Neill strengthened the squad with the signing of midfielder Steve Brown from Northampton Town for £60,000 and Nicky Reid, a free transfer from West Bromwich Albion. A 3–2 aggregate defeat in the Southern area final of the Associate Members Cup denied the Blues a trip to Wembley but everyone hoped a Wembley visit wouldn't be needed with automatic promotion still a realistic target. It came down a crunch game with Crewe Alexandra at Gresty Road. Ashley Ward gave the railwaymen a first-minute lead but a bizarre own goal from Darren Rowbotham soon pulled the Wanderers level. However, Ward snatched a winner 14 minutes from time and they jumped above the Blues into the automatic promotion places. A 1–1 draw with Preston North End on the final day of the season wasn't enough and the club had to settle for the play-offs. Martin O'Neill knew the disappointment would be huge but fortunately a trip Wembley Arena for the London Standard 5-a-sides provided the perfect tonic, as perennial substitute goalkeeper Chuck Moussadik performed heroics and was voted man of the tournament as Wimbledon were beaten on sudden death penalties in the final.

The semi-final saw the Wanderers travel up to in-form Carlisle United for the first leg and put in one of their best performances of the season. Steve Thompson gave the visitors a priceless lead on the half hour and with five minutes to go Simon Garner raced away to seal a 2–0 win. Within seven minutes of the second leg at Adams Park Dave Carroll had headed home and another trip to Wembley was confirmed when Simon Garner slid the ball past Tony Caig early in the second half. The Cumbrians grabbed a consolation from the penalty spot with Wycombe winning 4–1 on aggregate. The final at Wembley was against Preston North End and almost 20,000 Wycombe fans made the journey to the home of football. Goalkeeper Paul Hyde played despite having been sick all week, and Wycombe dominated the first half, but despite Steve Thompson equalising immediately after Ian Bryson had given North End the lead, they took a 2–1 advantage into the break through Paul Raynor. Within two minutes of the restart Simon Garner showed great control taking a long pass from David Titterton before firing unerringly past Woods. Ten minutes later an immaculate one-touch four-man passing move cut the Preston defence asunder and Dave Carroll passed the ball into the back of the net to give Wanderers the lead for the first time. A 4–2 win was sealed with 17 minutes to go when Carroll went on a trademark jinking run before cutting back on the edge of the area and smashing in a shot off the post. It still ranks as arguably the greatest ever Wycombe Wanderers performance and Martin O'Neill had led his team to another promotion, for the second year running.

The 1994–95 season hadn't even started when the club was hit with a blow. Hugely influential winger Steve Guppy turned down a new contract and when Newcastle United made a take-it-or-leave-it offer of £150,000, Martin O'Neill reluctantly accepted the offer. Again the manager made few changes, the only one being the arrival of veteran striker Cyrille Regis, who in his 36th year made the move to Adams Park after nearly two decades in the top two divisions. The season started in incredible fashion, Cambridge United were comfortably beaten 3–0 on the opening day, Simon Garner scoring within two minutes. Garner did it again the following week, scoring the winner in a 1–0 win at Huddersfield Town, on the inauguration of their new stadium. Wycombe fans had to pinch themselves when the side even went to St. Andrews, home of Birmingham City and came away with a 1–0 win, courtesy of a header from Cyrille Regis - a former player of their four biggest local rivals. Revenge was sweet at Gresty Road where a Dave Carroll free-kick helped the Blues to a 2–1 win over Crewe Alexandra. Simon Garner notched a hat-trick in a 5–0 FA Cup second round tie at Hitchin Town, but the run came to end at the hands of Premier League West Ham United in the third round, the Hammers winning 2–0 at Adams Park.

O'Neill began to seriously strengthen the squad at the beginning of 1995. Mickey Bell signed from Northampton Town for £45,000, Gary Patterson joined from Shrewsbury Town for £70,000, Terry Howard joined on a free from Leyton Orient, Miquel Desouza cost £80,000 from Birmingham City and a then club record fee of £140,000 was paid for Steve McGavin, also from Birmingham. Desouza made an immediate impact, scoring twice on his debut in a 2–0 win at Chester City and scoring six goals in his first six appearances. Unfortunately disaster struck as he suffered an injury in training and he only returned on the last day of the season. The goals dried up and a run of eight games without a win saw the side slip out of the play-off chase. A late recovery raised hopes but a 2–1 defeat at home to relegation-bound Plymouth Argyle condemned the side to a sixth-place finish. That would normally have been sufficient for a play-off place but reorganisation of the league meant there was only one automatic promotion spot and the Blues missed out by just three points, ending hope of a third successive promotion. It would be 25 years before a place in the second tier was finally attained.

Wycombe fans would soon be dismayed when the news they had been dreading for the last two or three years finally became a reality when Martin O'Neill was leaving Wycombe Wanderers. Like Kelman before him, O'Neill's relationship with the board was deteriorating and when Norwich City wanted to speak to him, he felt as if the club was trying to get rid of him. O'Neill met with Canaries Chairman Robert Chase at Heathrow and accepted the job at Carrow Road in June 1995.

Despite more than 60 applications for the vacancy, only one man was interviewed for the job, Alan Smith. He had just left Crystal Palace, relegated from the Premier League and semi finalists in both of the major cups, and was an old acquaintance of Brian Lee. He was a popular choice and was unanimously accepted by the board. Smith made one addition to the squad during the summer, left-back Paul Hardyman from Bristol Rovers but after a slow start to the season he signed Jason Rowbotham, David Farrell from Aston Villa for £100,000 and striker John Williams from Coventry City for £150,000, another record fee. The team went 14 league games without defeat during the autumn, suggesting that another promotion could be achieved that season, but things started to unravel in November. An Associate Members Cup tie at Walsall saw the team 4–0 down at half-time and Smith proceeded to conduct his half-time team talk in the centre-circle. A desperate 1–0 defeat by Gillingham in an FA Cup first round replay followed and after a 4–2 league defeat at Carlisle United, popular goalkeeper Paul Hyde fell out with the manager and never played for the team again. Smith relied on loanees, Ben Roberts from Middlesbrough and Sieb Dykstra from Queens Park Rangers to keep goal for the rest of the season.

It soon become a disappointing campaign, inconsistent results and a change in the style of football saw crowds steadily fall. Miquel Desouza created history, scoring a hat-trick both home and away against Bradford City and Dave Carroll scored a sensational solo goal in a 4–1 thrashing of Stockport County but a serious promotion challenge never materialised and the team finished in 12th place. A crowd of 2,836 for a midweek home fixture with Rotherham United remains the club's lowest ever Football League attendance.

The summer of 1996 was one of change. Out went the likes of Simon Garner, Steve Thompson, Simon Stapleton, Tony Hemmings and Terry Howard. In came two goalkeepers, Brian Parkin and John Cheesewright and centre-back Paul McCarthy, a £100,000 capture from Brighton & Hove Albion. The season started in bizarre fashion, in more than one sense. The club had to play its opening game of the season away at Shrewsbury Town on a Sunday due to the town's flower show and the team wore a new pin-striped change shirt, which was christened with a stunning equaliser from Steve Brown to earn a 1–1 draw. Alan Smith always had a tough act to follow in O'Neill and after falling-out with popular players, playing a role in the changing of the quartered kit to stripes and disappointing performances he had to get results. But he didn't, and after a start of eight league games without a win, the ninth game, a 6–3 defeat by Peterborough United was the final straw and he was sacked. Caretaker boss Neil Smillie helped guide the team to two important wins, over Rotherham United and Notts County but a series of defeats followed which left the side languishing at the bottom of the table. It was something of a surprise when John Gregory, a coach at Aston Villa, was appointed the new boss. He slowly started to turn things around, and the team started winning regularly at home. A first round FA Cup tie with rivals Colchester United at Layer Road added some excitement and goals from Miquel Desouza and one from a suspiciously offside looking John Williams gave the Wanderers a very sweet 2–1 victory. Gregory realised the need to strengthen the squad and brought in midfielder Michael Simpson from Notts County for £50,000, Michael Forsyth and Jason Kavanagh from Derby County, for £25,000 each, striker Mark Stallard from Bradford City for £100,000 and striker Paul Read from Arsenal, also for £100,000. A first away win of the season was gained with an exciting 4–3 victory at Bristol Rovers just before Christmas. The team won eight of its last ten home games, remaining unbeaten at Adams Park. However, away wins proved elusive and the battle to avoid relegation went right to the wire. A pivotal result was secured at home to relegation rivals Shrewsbury Town, and it featured two loanees, goalkeeper Martin Taylor from Derby County and returning striker Keith Scott from Norwich City, making his second debut for the club. Taylor made a number of crucial saves and Scott gave the Wanderers the lead and went to win 3–0. A second away win came at Notts County, A long-range opportunist strike from Steve Brown was cancelled out, but a winner from Steve McGavin gave the Blues a 2–1 win and condemned County to the drop. It was a great escape and the club had won its first battle against relegation in the Football League.

Goalkeeper Martin Taylor, on a free transfer, and striker Keith Scott, for £55,000, both signed permanently in the close season and the club reverted to the popular quartered shirt for the 1997–98 campaign. They were defeated 5–2 by newly promoted Wigan Athletic at Springfield Park. However, after a 4–1 home win over Southend United in early September the side reached third place. It wouldn't last as a similar pattern to the previous season emerged. The team were difficult to beat at Adams Park, losing just three league games there all season. But there were just four away wins as the side struggled on its travels and finished in 14th place. There was bitter disappointment in the FA Cup as the club were the victims of a giant-killing for the first time as a Football League club. Basingstoke Town came from 2–0 draw to gain a 2–2 draw at Adams Park before a similar result in the replay at the Camrose Ground. Keith Scott saw his decisive spot-kick saved and the non-leaguers won 5–4 on penalties. The biggest shock came in February 1998 when manager John Gregory was chosen to as the unlikely successor to Brian Little at his former club Aston Villa. Youth team boss Neil Smillie again took caretaker control and after losing just two of 12 games in charge he was given the job on a permanent basis.

The start of the 1998–99 season was a baptism of fire for Smillie and his team, going 12 league games without a win at the start of the campaign. A 3–0 win over Macclesfield Town was followed by a win over Wrexham by the same scoreline and a sense of optimism returned after Manchester City were beaten 1–0 at Adams Park. One of the players who helped lift the team was young striker Andy Baird, a product of the youth team. Smillie had also strengthened the team bringing in Chris Vinnicombe from Burnley on a free transfer, Dannie Bulman from Ashford Town (Middx) for £10,000, Paul Emblen from Charlton Athletic for £60,000, Matt Lawrence from Fulham for £86,000 and hot prospect Jermaine McSporran from Oxford City for £75,000. The team went into the new year looking to escape the bottom four but after a run of six games without a win Smillie was sacked.

Terry Evans took caretaker charge for almost a month until Lawrie Sanchez was appointed in February 1999. His first game in charge was a creditable 1–1 draw at home to Kevin Keegan's high flying Fulham Steve McGavin left the club for personal reasons before Sanchez was appointed and the new boss was told he had to make £200,000 from transfers before the end of the season. His first signing was Canadian defender Mark Rogers, who paid his own air fare to England to pursue his dream of playing professional football. By March Jason Kavanagh and Nicky Mohan had departed for Stoke City whilst Notts County paid £20,000 for Mark Stallard. Striker Sean Devine was brought in on loan from Barnet but there was stunning news to follow when Keith Scott signed for local rivals Reading for £250,000. Scott departed on the same evening that Wanderers travelled to Bristol Rovers, five points adrift at the bottom of the table and eight points from safety. A brave header from Jason Cousins gave the visitors the lead, one which saw Cousins miss the rest of the season and a Sean Devine shot from the edge of the area in the second half brought an unlikely victory. It proved to be a catalyst as the side lost just 2 of its last 11 league games. The highlight was a 2–1 win away at Manchester City, where first half goals from Baird and Devine sealed a magnificent double against the fallen giants. Devine was signed permanently for a club record £200,000. The penultimate game of the season was at home to promotion chasing Wigan Athletic, who went a goal up in the first half but soon pegged back by some sharper shooting from Devine. Early in the second half Paul Emblen deflected in the winning goal to set up a tense final day away at Lincoln City. The club paid for 30-odd supporters coaches and 2,643 Wanderers made the journey to Sincil Bank. A tense game saw Baird miss a golden early chance and when Michael Forsyth hit the post it looked like it really was mission impossible. However, with just seven minutes of the season remaining Devine crossed for Emblen a header over Vaughan and into the top corner of the net. It was an incredible finale to amazing escape from a relegation that seemed a certainty for much of the season. It brought the new manager much praise, but he was to go on to even greater things.

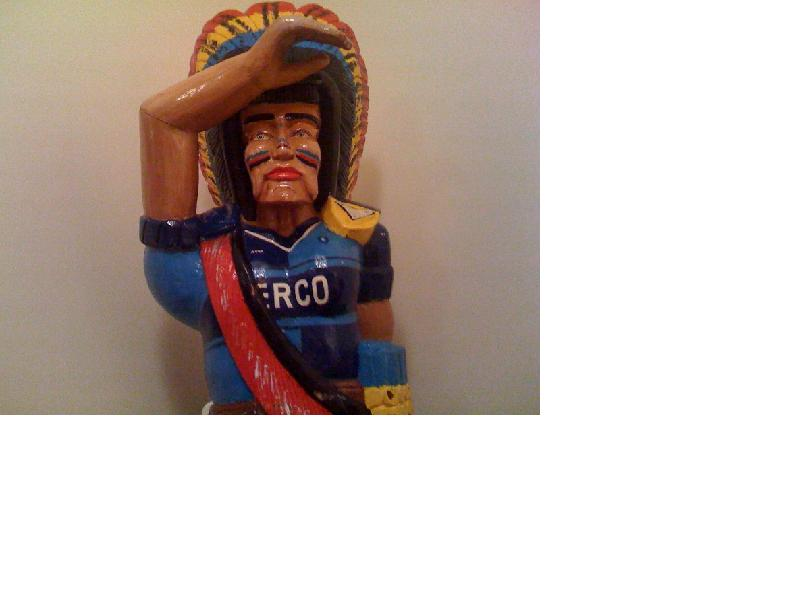
Wycombe Comanche in the WWFC Strip

A 5 ft (2 m) wooden statue of a Native American 'Comanche' was spotted by the team as they passed a second hand shop on the way to Sincil Bank (home to Lincoln City) for the last game of the season and decided that if they won and subsequently survived relegation they would purchase him as a lucky charm and he would become the club's mascot. The Wycombe Comanche was thus purchased and painted in Wycombe colours. He remained at the club throughout the Sanchez reign and even featured in the centre of the squad photo in the 1999–2000 season. He was put on the centre circle before home matches at Adams Park. He is now believed to reside somewhere in Scotland.

The 1999–2000 season included a short-lived run in the Football League Cup which saw a Jermaine McSporran inspired 4–2 win against Wolverhampton Wanderers at Molineux in the second leg after a 1–0 defeat in the first leg. Their Black Country neighbours West Bromwich Albion were the opponents in the second round and after a 1–1 draw in the first leg at the Hawthorns, the Baggies won the second leg 4–3 after extra time. The team remained mid-table during the season, finishing 12th. Highlights included a 5–3 win over local rivals Reading, a 3–0 win over Colchester United and a 3–1 win at Wrexham which saw young full-back Danny Senda score his first goal for the Blues and another free-kick from Dave Carroll. The FA Cup contest against non-league Oxford City almost saw a penalty shoot-out before a fire underneath the away stand meant the game had to be abandoned. The replay at Oxford United's Manor Ground saw the Wanderers gain a 1–0 win. Matt Lawrence made a £250,000 move to Millwall just before transfer deadline day and Roger Johnson became the youngest ever Wycombe player to play in the Football League at 17 years and 8 days in the final game of the season.

There was a blow at the start of the 2000–01 season when Sean Devine was ruled out with a serious knee injury, one that would keep him out for the whole of the campaign. There was an encouraging start to the league, with a 2–1 win away at Millwall, a 3–1 win over local rivals Oxford United at Adams Park and a 3–1 win against league leaders Walsall Andy Rammell score a brace in the win, who the Wanderers had just signed from the Saddlers for £75,000. There was more bad news with injuries to Paul Emblen, Andy Baird and Jermaine McSporran and Sanchez, short of strikers, had to rely on the loan market, bringing in Steve Jones, Sam Parkin and triallist Niall Thompson.

In November an embryonic FA Cup run began with a 3–0 win over Harrow Borough but the second round saw the Blues face a tough trip to promotion favourites Millwall The tie was played on a Sunday and a patched-up team managed to somehow scrape a goalless draw. In the replay goals from Thompson and McCarthy sealed a very satisfying 2–1 win but in the third round they were paired with an unglamorous but difficult tie at home to Grimsby Town. McCarthy equalised to take it a replay and on a freezing cold January evening in Cleethorpes history was made. It was a night of personal triumph for young midfielder Martyn Lee. On the half hour he whipped in a free-kick and McCarthy flicked the ball past the keeper. Two minutes another Lee free-kick was only cleared to the edge of the area and Michael Simpson volleyed home. Grimsby pulled a goal back just before half-time but with almost an hour on the clock Mark Rogers headed home a Lee corner to make it 3–1. Wycombe Wanderers were in the fourth round for the first time in the club's history. They were drawn at home to the other WWFC, Wolverhampton Wanderers. A 9,617 sell-out watched Andy Rammell poke home ten minutes before half-time and celebrated by diving into the snow. Wolves snatched a deserved equaliser early in the second half but with five minutes to go a deep cross from Steve Brown was headed emphatically into the corner of the net by Sam Parkin to make it 2–1 and spark more scenes of celebration.

Wycombe faced a seemingly fateful fifth round encounter with Lawrie Sanchez's former club Wimbledon and after the Wombles had taken a 2–0 first half lead, a deflected Michael Simpson and a suspiciously offside looking equaliser from Steve Brown took the tie to a replay at Selhurst Park. 4,551 Wycombe fans made the journey to South London and Gareth Ainsworth soon gave the Dons the lead. Halfway through the first half Dave Carroll fired in an equaliser after Rammell's shot was blocked. Andy Rammell was then replaced by Andy Baird after suffering a recurrence of a groin injury and Baird lasted less than five minutes after a shocking challenge from Dons defender Mark Williams. Baird had to be carried off and he was replaced by Parkin. The second half was tight affair but the home side gained a numerical advantage when Michael Simpson was sent off for a second bookable offence. In the last minute Paul McCarthy was adjudged to have handled the ball but goalkeeper Martin Taylor pulled off a fine save to deny Neal Ardley from the spot. However, in the first minute of extra time Wayne Gray fired home to give Wimbledon a 2–1 lead. There seemed no way back for the Wanderers as the clock ticked into the 120th minute but Bulman's sliced shot from the edge fell perfectly for McCarthy to poke the ball past Kelvin Davis to make it 2–2. Penalties it was and it went to sudden death. It looked all over again when Jamie Bates' penalty was saved by Davis but Taylor then saved from Peter Hawkins. The goalkeeper then scored himself and when Mark Williams smashed his kick high over the bar, the celebrations could begin, the Wanderers winning 8–7.

The Chairboys had reached the giddy heights of the quarter-finals and were rewarded with a trip to Filbert Street to take on Leicester City, flying high in fourth place in the Premier League. The club had been unable to do a deal to sign Parkin permanently from Chelsea and sent out an SOS for a striker which was even advertised on teletext. Northern Irish front man Roy Essandoh answered the call and made his debut in 1–0 defeat at home to Port Vale. A week later 3,202 Chairboys and girls made the journey up to Leicestershire and saw Manchester United loanee George Clegg and Wanderers legend Keith Ryan lead the attack against the Foxes. After a goalless first half Paul McCarthy scored his fifth FA Cup goal, diving in to head home Steve Brown's free-kick from close range. The dream appeared to have been dashed when Muzzy Izzet finished off a fine move to equalise twenty minutes later but the underdogs brushed off that disappointment and after Robbie Savage had to be substituted through injury and Essandoh replaced Ryan they seized the initiative in the final ten minutes and looked to have a good penalty shout turned down after Stefan Oakes appeared to handle in the area. Lawrie Sanchez was incensed and walked out of his technical area and down the touchline to remonstrate with the linesman. As the game went into injury-time Bulman swung in a cross to far post where Bates headed the ball back for Essandoh to leap like the proverbial salmon and head powerfully past Royce into the top corner. It was a sensational moment and although referee Steve Bennett played the role of spoilsport by showing Steve Brown a second yellow card for removing his shirt in celebration, there was little time for Leicester to come back and he blew the final whistle to confirm one of the biggest shocks in the competition's history. It sparked wild scenes of elation and disbelief as Wycombe Wanderers, a Football League club for less than eight years, were through to the semi-finals of the FA Cup.

The journey took the Blues to Villa Park to face Liverpool. 19,403 supporters travelled to Birmingham for one of the most memorable moments in the club's history. Their defence stood up to an internationally renowned attack boasting the likes of Michael Owen, Robbie Fowler, Nick Barmby, Gary McAllister, Steven Gerrard, and Emile Heskey. They were just 12 minutes left when Gerrard's cross was headed home by Heskey. Four minutes later a Robbie Fowler free-kick made it two and the Reds looked home and dry. However, with just three minutes left Keith Ryan chipped the ball over Sander Westerveld and into the net to make it 2–1. The Cup run had seen the team's league form falter and were left precariously close to a relegation battle with a back log of fixtures. An Easter Monday fixture at Bristol City was crucial and Wycombe came from a goal down to win 2–1 thanks to a last minute winner from Guy Whittingham. Safety was assured on the penultimate Saturday of the season when Dave Carroll scored his 100th goal for Wycombe in a 1–1 draw at Bury.

The 2001–02 season began with great expectations of a concerted push for promotion and Sanchez used some of the £1million made from the Cup run to strengthen the side. Midfielder Darren Currie joined from Barnet for £200,000 and enjoyed a great first season at Adams Park. £200,000 bids for strikers Jamie Forrester and Chris Greenacre were unsuccessful and Gavin Holligan was signed on a free transfer from West Ham United. There was similar failed attempts to sign centre-backs Shaun Maher, Martin McIntosh and Marlon Broomes to replace Jamie Bates who retired in the summer. The season started well and the sides lost just three of the first 19 league matches. Striker Richard Walker was signed on loan from Aston Villa and in October winger Stuart Roberts signed from Swansea City for £102,500 and made his debut in a 2–2 away at rivals Colchester United. There was another run in the FA Cup, although a shock was only avoided in the first round as the team came from behind to win 4–3 away at Hayes The club was given a home tie with Premier League Fulham in the third round and after coming from a goal down, Jermaine McSporran gave the Blues a 2–1 lead and only an injury-time equaliser by Steve Marlet prevented another giant-killing. The replay at Craven Cottage was won by a single Barry Hayles goal. The winter saw the start of a downward spiral for the club as those in power made a series of bad decisions. Simon Monkman was appointed as the club's first Chief Executive and one of his first tasks was to secure Rugby Union side London Wasps as tenants. There was a solitary appearance of defender Carlos Lopez in a 2–0 at Cambridge United which has now become legendary and the club brought a new scoreboard which suffered a number of technical failures before being removed. Results on the pitch deteriorated with the team winning just three of its last 14 league games to finish 11th.

Sanchez decided that the poor results were a consequence of an aging team and began major surgery on the squad. Paul Emblen, Dave Carroll, Jason Cousins, Stewart Castledine and Andy Baird were all released and replaced by Richard Harris, Andy Thomson, Frank Talia and Craig Faulconbridge. In August Chairman Ivor Beeks decided to offer the manager a lucrative new three-year contract, partly designed to ward off suitors. The 2002–03 season was one of struggle, winning just two of the opening ten league games. Chief Executive Simon Monkman resigned in September and it was later revealed by Chairman Ivor Beeks that the club "would have been bust by Christmas" and revealed over spending to the tune of £100,000 during the first quarter of the season. As the season stumbled into the winter months the manager endured a strained relationship with supporters, with a number of verbal battles conducted through local media. Sanchez incurred more wrath when he sold Sean Devine to Exeter City for £50,000 and during an away game at Cheltenham Town, banners demanded the removal of the manager were displayed. One defeat in eight matches just after Christmas brought the boss time but a dreadful 4–0 defeat by Chesterfield at Saltergate saw the under pressure gaffer bring his players over to the away fans and a heated debate ensued. Two further four goal defeats followed and the side failed to win any of its last eight games, escaping relegation by just four points, finishing 18th.

The summer of 2003 was one of discontent and Sanchez made more changes, out went Paul McCarthy, Martyn Lee and Martin Taylor. In came Charlie Mapes, Steve Dell and a series of loan strikers. However, there was huge controversy when the board sold the naming rights of the stadium to a local technology company for £100,000 over three years. The ground was named in honour of former player and administrator Frank Adams, who had gifted the club's former home Loakes Park in trust back in 1947. The decision was seen as an insult to his memory and showed a distinct lack of appreciation. Things were no better on the pitch and after a run of just one win in the opening nine league matches, Lawrie Sanchez was sacked. Bizarrely he was allowed to continue for two more matches before being replaced by John Gorman on a caretaker basis.

Sanchez's successor was former Arsenal and England defender Tony Adams but he was unable to save Wycombe's season and they were relegated in 2004, joining Football League Two for its first season under that name.

=== Recent years (2004–present) ===
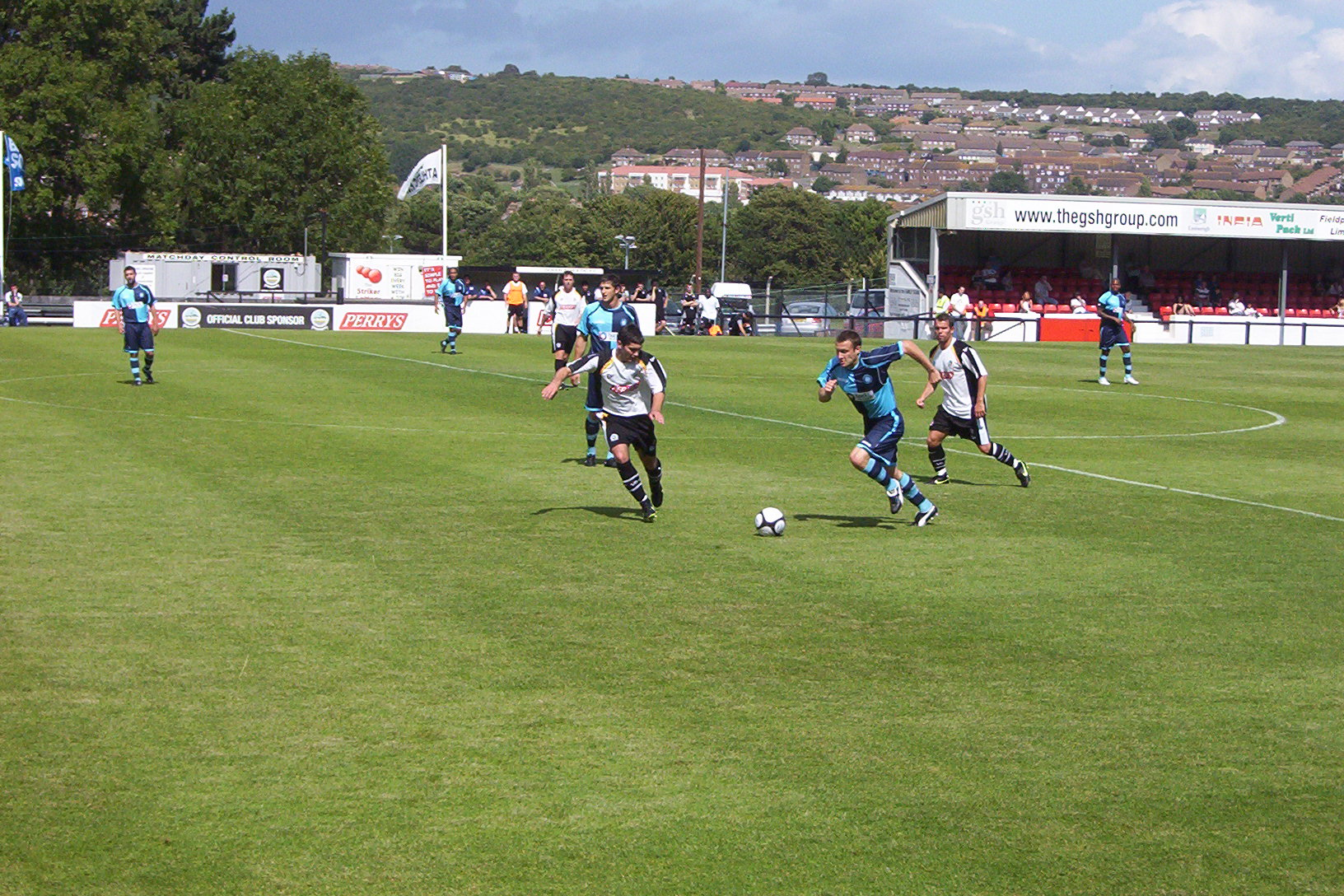
Wycombe (blue shirts) in action against Dover Athletic in 2009

The modern era began with fundamental changes off the pitch. A new company, Limited by Guarantee, was officially formed in April 1980 and it was activated in June 1986 when a new board of directors was formed. The constitution meant Wycombe Wanderers was English football's last members' club. Fans who held season tickets for three years paid £1 for the right to become one of a maximum of 500 members with control over the club, who elect the directors who retire by rotation. No major changes to the club's constitution could be made unless 75% per cent of the members agreed. There were attempts to change parts of the constitution in 1995 and 1998 but these were rejected by members. In August 2003 the club revealed that they had agreed a wage deferral scheme for both players and club staff. In January 2004 members were invited to attend a series of meetings under the heading of 'Building for the future', with the intention of raising £1.5m in new investment.

In July 2004 members received the final proposals for conversion to what was revealed for the first time as a Public Limited Company. Members interests and the long-term future of the Club are claimed to be protected by a number of special rights attached to what would be called 'Founder Shares'. The target for new investment was halved to £750,000. However, several concerns and questions remained unanswered but Board members said they didn't want further debate and the vote went ahead at an Extraordinary General Meeting on Thursday 29 July 2004. The members vote by a narrow margin to give formal approval for the reconstruction of the Club. 430 of the 498 members voted, with 335 (78%) in favour and 94 (22%) against and one paper spoilt. Chairman Ivor Beeks, Director Brian Kane and sponsor Steve Hayes all subsequently invested in the club, with an approx. total value of £750,000.

On the pitch the club's first season in League Two saw a change of manager as Tony Adams resigned and John Gorman took charge of the club after a brief spell as caretaker manager the previous season. Wycombe finished the season in 10th place. In April 2005 Steve Hayes became Managing Director of Wycombe Wanderers.

A 21-match unbeaten start to the 2005–06 campaign saw them lead the division for a considerable amount of time. During the second half of the season, the club was rocked by two setbacks. On 14 January 2006, whilst a match against Notts County was in progress, 21-year-old midfielder Mark Philo, who had made 19 appearances for the club, died in hospital after a car crash the previous night. His manager, John Gorman, paid tribute to him by saying, "He was a fantastic kid. He lived for football and always had a smile on his face". It was later revealed that Philo had been significantly over the drink-drive limit and veered onto the opposite side of the road, killing a 58-year-old mother of two. Just a few weeks later, Gorman's wife Myra died after a long illness, leading to him taking a period of compassionate leave away from the club.

Around this time Wycombe went on a six-match losing run, seeing them drop out of the automatic promotion challenge, finishing in 6th. They were eventually defeated 2–1 on aggregate by Cheltenham Town in the play-off semi-finals. It was later announced that Gorman had been relieved of his duties as the club's manager as the Wycombe board did not believe that he was in the right condition to manage the club (he then took up the vacant position at Northampton Town a few days later). After a five-week search, the club announced that the former Celtic captain Paul Lambert was to be the new manager having ended a managerial spell at Livingston that season.

The 2006–07 season began well with Wanderers winning 11 of their first 22 games and progressing into the semi-finals of the Football League Cup beating teams including Fulham and Charlton Athletic of the Premier League – the first time the club has lasted past the Second Round of the League Cup competition and the first time a team from the bottom tier has reached that stage since Chester City in the 1974–75 season. This gives Wycombe the distinction of being the only club to make it to at least the semi-final of the major Professional and Amateur cups. The team also defeated local rivals Oxford United in the FA Cup, but lost to Stockport County in the second round.

On 19 December 2006, they reached the semi-finals of the League Cup after winning away to Charlton Athletic 1–0, with 4,517 Blues fans making the journey. They were drawn against Chelsea, and heroically held the champions to a 1–1 draw at Adams Park in the first leg. Unfortunately for the Wanderers, in the return leg on 23 January 2007, Chelsea won 4–0 at Stamford Bridge to win 5–1 on aggregate. This feat made Wycombe Wanderers the only Football League side to reach the semi-finals of the FA Trophy, the FA Amateur Cup, the Football League Trophy, the Football League Cup and the most prestigious of all, the FA Cup.

Whilst undoubtedly a heroic achievement, the cup run, along with injuries to key players, contributed to a falling away of league form. For the second successive season, the club's promotion challenge faltered, and a run of eleven League games without a win (and four straight defeats) at the end of the season meant that Wanderers could only finish in 12th place.

The summer saw a considerable rebuilding of the playing squad, and Wycombe started the 2007–08 season with eleven new signings. Early form was inconsistent as the new players took time to settle – progress in the League was steady rather than spectacular, and the club went out of all the Cup competitions at the first hurdle. In addition, the leading goalscorer from the previous season, Jermaine Easter, became unsettled at the club, and was eventually sold to Plymouth Argyle for an initial fee of £210,000.

The turning point was a 6–0 reverse at Stockport County in December. Following this, the club put together a run of four successive League wins, and climbed into the play-off positions on Boxing Day. A more consistent second half of the season saw the play-off position maintained, and Wanderers came up against Stockport County again in the semi-finals at the end of the season. A 1–1 draw in a tense and physical first leg at Adams Park was followed by a narrow 1–0 defeat at Edgeley Park to end the club's hopes of promotion for another season.

Three days after the play-off defeat, it was announced that Paul Lambert had resigned from his position as manager, stating that "the time has come for me to move on". At a press conference on 29 May 2008 Peter Taylor was announced as Wycombe's new manager.

The 2008/09 season started well for Wycombe, with them embarking on an 18 match unbeaten run in the league, from the start of the season until 6 December when this was ended by Aldershot Town, who beat Wycombe 3–2. Wycombe's unbeaten home record in the league was ended by Grimsby Town, which saw the 'table toppers' beaten 1–0 by the strugglers, which was only Grimsby's 3rd win of the campaign so far.

On the last day of the season they managed to get promoted, even though they lost and the teams either side of them (before the last match was played) in the league table won. The 4th place team, Bury, had the same amounts of points as Wycombe but 1 less goal difference.

Wycombe had a disappointing start to 2009/10 and after picking up just six points from their first 11 games, they parted company with manager Taylor.

Wycombe appointed Gary Waddock from Aldershot Town to become the new manager with his first game being a 1–1 draw against rivals Colchester United. Waddock made major changes to the playing staff in January 2010, but an upturn in results came too late and Wycombe were relegated back to League 2 after a 2–0 loss against Leyton Orient on 1 May 2010.

Wycombe started the 2010–11 Season very well, remaining undefeated after five league games. Wycombe also remained the only side in League Two who had not lost an away game, an undefeated away run of 8 league games, until they were finally beaten away by Port Vale who beat them 2–1 in November 2010. At the end of the 2010–11 season, Wycombe were once again promoted to league one after a final day victory at home against Southend United.

On 30 June 2012, the Wycombe Wanderers Trust (Supporter owned) formally took over the club. This financial stabilisation ended a transfer embargo. Gary Waddock took advantage of this immediately and signed several new players for the 2012–13 season. The season also included their 125th anniversary, and the shirt design was an adaptation of their first-ever kit, in Oxford and Cambridge Blue halves (instead of quarters).

Wycombe kicked off their new season in League Two with a 3–1 victory away at York City. Despite this strong start, Wycombe went through a bad period soon after and for a while sat just above the relegation zone in League Two. On 22 September 2012, after Wycombe's third successive defeat, Waddock was sacked as manager with immediate effect.

==== Gareth Ainsworth era (2012–23) ====
Former club captain, Gareth Ainsworth was immediately named as the caretaker manager in Waddock's absence. Just over a month later, on 8 November 2012, Ainsworth was named as Wycombe's permanent manager. He signed a contract, lasting for the rest of the season. Ainsworth revitalised the squad and the club as a whole, and steered Wycombe safely away from the relegation threat. Wycombe eventually ended the season in 15th place, nine points clear of relegation. At the end of the season, Wycombe's player-manager Gareth Ainsworth announced his retirement from professional football (after an 18-year career), although he signed a new two-year contract as Wycombe manager.

At the start of the final day of the 2013–14 season, Wycombe were three points adrift of safety in the relegation zone of League Two. However, after a 3–0 win away at Torquay, and Bristol Rovers losing to Mansfield Town, Wycombe finished in 22nd place, above Bristol on goal difference, to remain in the Football League.

Following the near-relegation of the previous season, Gareth Ainsworth released seven players from the club, including defender Leon Johnson who had made 200 appearances in 7 years. During the summer break, Ainsworth rebuilt his squad, with the addition of Paul Hayes for a second spell at the club. The 2014–15 season saw the club spend the majority of the season in the automatic promotion places. However, two costly home defeats to Morecambe and local rivals Oxford United led to a finishing position of 4th, setting up a play-off fixture against Plymouth Argyle. The play-off final took place on 23 May and within five seconds of kick-off Wycombe midfielder Sam Saunders pulled his calf muscle and had to be substituted for Matt Bloomfield in the fourth minute. During the regular 90 minutes both teams had a goal disallowed, but neither managed to score. Four minutes into extra time Wycombe were awarded a free kick just outside the Southend penalty area. Joe Jacobson took the free kick and the ball rebounded off keeper Dan Bentley and into the net. Southend continued to put pressure on Wycombe until Joe Pigott scored in the 122nd minute to tie the game at 1–1 and send it to a penalty shoot out. Southend won the shoot out 7–6 when Sam Wood's effort was saved by Bentley.

In the 2017–18 season, Exeter and Notts County both losing respectively combined with Wycombe winning their penultimate game of the season ensured promotion to EFL League One, joining Luton Town and EFL League Two champions Accrington Stanley. In the 2019–20 season, Wycombe finished 3rd in League One on points per game due to the impact of COVID-19. They won the play-off semi final 6–3 on aggregate, against Fleetwood Town, then, on 13 July beat Oxford United 2–1 in the final, at an empty Wembley Stadium, to ensure that Wycombe would play in the EFL Championship for the first time in the club's history.

The 2020–21 Championship season was a learning experience for everyone involved with the club. With all but three of the 46 League matches being played behind closed doors due to the continuing COVID-19 pandemic, Wycombe struggled in the early stages, failing to register a point in their first seven League outings, and failing to score in their first four. An improved run of form, which included back-to-back wins against Sheffield Wednesday and Birmingham City, lifted Wycombe to 22nd in the table, but three successive defeats in December saw the club drop to bottom position on the Saturday before Christmas. The indifferent form continued into the New Year, but a fourth round FA Cup tie at home to Tottenham Hotspur proved a welcome distraction, with Wycombe taking the lead through Fred Onyedinma in the first half, before the Premier League club found their form to win the tie 4–1. Still bottom of the table going into the Easter period, Wycombe's fortunes then began to turn around significantly, and they still had a theoretical outside chance of survival going into the final game away at Middlesbrough. A 3–0 win was not enough, but results elsewhere meant that Wycombe finished the season in 22nd place with 43 points, 16 of which had been gained from the final eight games. The club was therefore relegated back to League One, but only by a margin of one point and an inferior goal difference to Derby County. After Derby County, previously accused of breaching financial fair play regulations, went into administration in September 2021, Wycombe considered legal action to recoup potential losses of up to £20m.

Gareth Ainsworth departed to replace Neil Critchley at Queens Park Rangers on 21 February 2023.

==== Matt Bloomfield ====
The club quickly sought a replacement in former Wycombe club captain Matt Bloomfield, who had just won the Manager of the Month for January at Colchester United, a club he had joined from Wycombe just four months earlier. Bloomfield officially signed for Wycombe on 22 February. Ainsworth's departure marked the end of a period of unprecedented success for the club. During his time he took the club from the bottom of League Two to the Championship for the first time in their history.

On 2 May 2023, Wycombe announced that O'Neills would no longer be their kit manufacturer, under a month later, they announced that Danish-German company Hummel would replace the Irish manufacturers.

=== Lomtadze ownership ===
Following the conclusion of the 2023–24 season, Wycombe Wanderers underwent a change in ownership. In May 2024, Mikheil Lomtadze, a Georgian-Kazakh businessman and co-founder of technology company Kaspi.kz, acquired a 90% stake in the club through Blue Ocean Partners II Limited. The remaining 10% continued to be held by the Wycombe Wanderers Supporters Trust. Lomtadze succeeded American businessman Rob Couhig, who had owned the club since 2020. As part of the change in ownership, Dan Rice joined the club's board and became chief football officer, with responsibility for football operations including recruitment, the first team, academy, coaching, sports science and analysis. Lomtadze stated that the club's long-term strategy would include greater use of data analytics and technology, together with renewed investment in youth development and the academy.

Rice subsequently became chairman and continued to oversee the club's football operations. In June 2026, he acquired a 10% shareholding in Wycombe from Feliciana EFL Limited, resulting in a revised ownership structure of 80% for Feliciana EFL Limited, 10% for Rice and 10% for the Supporters Trust. Lomtadze remained the club's majority owner.

Under Matt Bloomfield, Wycombe began the 2024–25 season strongly, going 19 league matches unbeaten and winning eight consecutive matches during the run. The side spent much of the first half of the campaign in the automatic promotion places. On 14 January 2025, however, Bloomfield left Wycombe to become manager of Luton Town. His coaching staff of Richard Thomas, Lee Harrison and Ben Cirne also left to join him. In the interim, Sam Grace, Harry Hudson, Matty Dye and Jerome John oversaw first-team preparations.

==== Mike Dodds ====
On 2 February 2025, Wycombe appointed Mike Dodds as head coach on a contract running until June 2028. Dodds joined from Sunderland, where he had served as an assistant coach and had taken temporary charge of the first team on several occasions. He had previously worked in player development at Birmingham City and Coventry City. His appointment formed part of the club's stated strategy of developing young players and strengthening the pathway between the academy and first team.

Dodds inherited a Wycombe side competing near the top of EFL League One. His first match in charge was the FA Cup fourth-round tie away to Preston North End, which Wycombe lost on penalties following a goalless draw. His first league victory came against Bristol Rovers, a 2–0 win at Adams Park. Wycombe ultimately finished fifth in League One and qualified for the play-offs. They were eliminated in the semi-finals by Charlton Athletic, who subsequently won promotion to the EFL Championship.

Dodds remained in charge at the beginning of the 2025–26 season. After a poor start to the campaign, Wycombe parted company with Dodds and first-team coach Pete Shuttleworth on 18 September 2025. Dodds had been in charge for seven months.

==== Michael Duff ====
On the same day as Dodds' departure, Wycombe appointed Michael Duff as head coach. Duff had previously managed Cheltenham Town, Barnsley, Swansea City and Huddersfield Town. His appointment followed a playing and coaching career which included spells at Burnley, where he subsequently worked within the club's academy.

Duff's first season at Wycombe ended with the club finishing 11th in League One. The club subsequently entered the 2026–27 season under Duff, but failed to win any of its opening five league matches. On 8 September 2026, Wycombe announced that Duff and first-team coach Alex Morris had left the club. Duff departed after almost a year in charge, with the club stating that the decision followed a prolonged run of disappointing results.

The departure of Duff represented the third change of head coach at Wycombe since Bloomfield's departure in January 2025. The club subsequently appointed an interim coaching arrangement while beginning the process of determining its next permanent head coach.
