= List of Wycombe Wanderers F.C. players =

== 250 or more appearances ==
This is a list of all Wycombe Wanderers F.C. players with 250 or more first-team appearances for the club, up until the end of the 2025–26 season, in descending order of number of appearances.

| Name | Nationality | Position | Time At Club | Appearances | Goals |
|---|---|---|---|---|---|
| Tony Horseman | England | Forward | 1961–1978 | 749 | 416 |
| John Maskell | England | Goalkeeper | 1964–1980 | 616 | 0 |
| Dave Carroll | Scotland | Midfielder | 1988–2002 | 602 | 100 |
| Matt Bloomfield | England | Midfielder | 2003–2022 | 558 | 42 |
| Keith Ryan | England | Midfielder | 1990–2006 | 515 | 50 |
| Len Worley | England | Outside Right | 1954–1970 | 512 | 67 |
| Jason Cousins | England | Defender | 1991–2002 | 473 | 9 |
| Paul Birdseye | England | Defender | 1971–1982 | 458 | 14 |
| Steve Brown | England | Midfielder | 1993–2004 | 443 | 43 |
| Alf Britnell | England | Midfielder | 1928–1945 | 432 | 74 |
| Micky Holifield | England | Midfielder | 1971–1981 | 422 | 84 |
| Gary Lester | England | Goalkeeper | 1979–1990 | 420 | 0 |
| Paul Bates | England | Forward | 1953–1962, 1964–1968 | 418 | 309 |
| Charlie Gale | England | Defender | 1961–1971 | 413 | 25 |
| Howard Kennedy | England | Midfielder | 1974–1983 | 407 | 100 |
| Joe Jacobson | Wales | Defender | 2014–2024 | 400 | 44 |
| Bunny Hooper | England | Defender | 1900–1914 | 390 | 23 |
| Charlie Tilbury | England | | 1900–1914 | 389 | 11 |
| William Buchanan | England | Forward | 1892–1906 | 386 | 228 |
| Mark West | England | Forward | 1984–1993 | 381 | 171 |
| George Stevens | England | Midfield | 1893–1905 | 376 | 19 |
| Dickie Cox | England | Defender | 1929–1938, 1940–1945 | 365 | 4 |
| John Beck | England | Defender | 1957–1968 | 359 | 22 |
| Ian Rundle | England | Defender | 1965–1974 | 357 | 5 |
| Keith Mead | England | Defender | 1973–1982 | 352 | 14 |
| Barry Baker | England | Midfielder | 1963–1971 | 348 | 12 |
| Jock McCallum | Scotland | Forward | 1935–1937, 1938–1951 | 348 | 224 |
| Michael Simpson | England | Midfielder | 1996–2003 | 339 | 20 |
| Frank Adams | England | Forward | 1910–1914, 1919–1929 | 331 | 104 |
| Matt Crossley | England | Defender | 1987–1996 | 330 | 10 |
| Bob Dell | England | Midfielder | 1979–1986 | 319 | 32 |
| Danny Senda | England | Defender | 1997–2005 | 316 | 9 |
| Fred C Keen | England | Defender | 1894–1903 | 296 | 21 |
| Jimmy Moring | England | Defender | 1952–1960 | 295 | 7 |
| Anthony Stewart | England | Defender | 2011–2014, 2015–2022 | 292 | 18 |
| Jim Kipping | England | Goalkeeper | 1923–1933 | 289 | 0 |
| Martin Taylor | England | Goalkeeper | 1996–2003 | 284 | 0 |
| Dennis Syrett | England | Goalkeeper | 1952–1960, 1963–1965 | 279 | 0 |
| Bert Crump | England | Defender | 1935–1949 | 278 | 2 |
| Josh Scowen | England | Midfielder | 2011–2015, 2021– | 277 | 8 |
| Steve Long | England | Forward | 1978–1985 | 275 | 98 |
| Steve Guppy | England | Midfielder | 1989–1994, 2004–2005 | 269 | 38 |
| Simon Stapleton | England | Midfielder | 1989–1996 | 269 | 27 |
| Bob Collier | England | Defender | 1892–1903 | 264 | 6 |
| Chris Vinnicombe | England | Defender | 1998–2004 | 263 | 2 |
| Frank Westley | England | Defender | 1949–1957 | 262 | 6 |
| Glyn Creaser | England | Defender | 1988–1996 | 260 | 22 |
| Jack Grimmer | Scotland | Defender | 2019– | 260 | 7 |
| Albert Keen | England | Defender | 1894–1906 | 260 | 7 |
| Bill Brown | England | Forward | 1925–1936, 1938–1939 | 259 | 190 |
| Fred Gates | England | Defender | 1919–1928 | 259 | 8 |
| Paul McCarthy | Republic of Ireland | Defender | 1996–2003 | 259 | 19 |
| Fred Pheby | England | Forward | 1903–1906, 1907–1914 | 258 | 157 |
| Andy Kerr | England | Defender | 1988–1994 | 254 | 33 |
| Anton Vircavs | England | Defender | 1981–1986, 1992–1993 | 251 | 22 |
| Adebayo Akinfenwa | England | Forward | 2016–2022 | 250 | 61 |

== 50 or more goals ==
This is a list of all Wycombe Wanderers F.C. players with 50 or more first-team goals for the club, up until the end of the 2025–26 season, in descending order of number of goals.

| Name | Nationality | Position | Time At Club | Appearances | Goals |
|---|---|---|---|---|---|
| Tony Horseman | England | Forward | 1961–1978 | 749 | 416 |
| Paul Bates | England | Forward | 1953–1962, 1964–1968 | 418 | 309 |
| William Buchanan | England | Forward | 1892–1906 | 386 | 228 |
| Jock McCallum | Scotland | Forward | 1935–1937, 1938–1951 | 348 | 224 |
| Bill Brown | England | Forward | 1925–1936, 1938–1939 | 259 | 190 |
| Mark West | England | Forward | 1984–1993 | 381 | 171 |
| Tim Hinton | England | Forward | 1920–1926 | 155 | 168 |
| Cliff Trott | England | Forward | 1954–1961 | 224 | 158 |
| Fred Pheby | England | Forward | 1903–1906, 1907–1914 | 258 | 157 |
| Tommy Andrews | England | Forward | 1934–1950 | 229 | 149 |
| Klon Smith | England | Forward | 1912–1914, 1919–1925 | 187 | 144 |
| Reggie Boreham | England | Forward | 1919–1927 | 157 | 141 |
| Keith Searle | England | Forward | 1969–1975 | 249 | 124 |
| Keith Samuels | England | Forward | 1963–1970 | 247 | 115 |
| Ralph Roberts | England | Forward | 1904–1913 | 225 | 114 |
| Norman Turner | England | Forward | 1933–1946 | 176 | 113 |
| Fred Abbott | England | Forward | 1893–1899 | 173 | 107 |
| William Brion | England | Forward | 1902–1911, 1912–1913 | 248 | 107 |
| Billy O'Gorman | England | Forward | 1909–1914, 1919–1924 | 212 | 107 |
| Frank Jennings | England | Forward | 1889–1893, 1895–1900 | 220 | 106 |
| Frank Adams | England | Forward | 1910–1914, 1919–1929 | 331 | 104 |
| Dave Carroll | Scotland | Midfielder | 1988–2002 | 602 | 100 |
| Howard Kennedy | England | Midfielder | 1974–1983 | 407 | 100 |
| Steve Long | England | Forward | 1978–1985 | 275 | 98 |
| Keith Scott | England | Forward | 1990–1994, 1996–1999 | 208 | 97 |
| Tommy Jackman | England | Forward | 1919–1923 | 126 | 95 |
| Terry Glynn | England | Forward | 1980–1984 | 185 | 90 |
| Micky Holifield | England | Midfielder | 1971–1981 | 422 | 84 |
| Dennis Atkins | England | Forward | 1951–1961 | 166 | 80 |
| Dick Braisher | England | Forward | 1927–1934 | 153 | 76 |
| Alf Britnell | England | Midfielder | 1928–1945 | 432 | 74 |
| Dylan Evans | Wales | Forward | 1973–1979 | 248 | 71 |
| Jackie Tomlin | England | Forward | 1952–1961 | 226 | 71 |
| Steve Perrin | England | Forward | 1973–1976, 1982–1984 | 188 | 68 |
| Len Worley | England | Midfielder | 1954–1970 | 512 | 67 |
| Frank Avery | England | Forward | 1937–1948 | 63 | 66 |
| John Delaney | England | Defender | 1969–1973, 1975–1976 | 228 | 65 |
| Joey Grace | Wales | Forward | 1919–1929 | 205 | 63 |
| Geoff Truett | England | Forward | 1952–1957 | 114 | 63 |
| Datchet Webb | England | Forward | 1887–1898 | 124 | 63 |
| Adebayo Akinfenwa | England | Forward | 2016–2022 | 250 | 61 |
| Declan Link | England | Forward | 1984–1987 | 96 | 61 |
| Larry Pritchard | England | Midfielder | 1970–1974 | 199 | 57 |
| Simon Read | England | Forward | 1984–1986 | 108 | 57 |
| Joey Goodchild | England | Forward | 1911–1914 | 66 | 56 |
| Frank Langley | England | Forward | 1904–1911 | 194 | 55 |
| Ken Butler | England | Forward | 1943–1954 | 180 | 53 |
| Nathan Tyson | England | Forward | 2003–2006, 2017–2019 | 141 | 53 |
| Peter Birdseye | England | Forward | 1946–1951 | 104 | 50 |
| Viv Busby | England | Forward | 1966–1970 | 90 | 50 |
| Keith Ryan | England | Midfielder | 1990–2006 | 515 | 50 |
