= Alan Gane =

English football player and manager (born 1950)

Personal information
- Date of birth: 11 June 1950 (age 76)
- Place of birth: Chiswick, London, England
- Position: Midfielder

Youth career
- 1964–1968: Chelsea

Senior career*
Years	Team	Apps	(Gls)
1968–1969	Sutton United		
1969	Slough Town		
1969–1972	Brentford		
1972–1973	Wycombe Wanderers	26	(2)
1973–1975	Hereford United	9	(1)
1975–1976	Chelmsford City		
1976–1981	Slough Town		
1981–1983	Staines Town		
1983–1984	Wokingham Town		
1984–1986	Walton & Hersham		

International career
1966	England Schools	3	(0)

Managerial career
- 1986–1987: Wycombe Wanderers
- 1987–1989: Staines Town
- 1987–1991: Wealdstone
- 1991–1996: Sutton United
- * Club domestic league appearances and goals

Alan Gane (born 11 June 1950) is an English former amateur footballer and manager. He is notable for promoting Wycombe Wanderers from the non-League Isthmian League into the Conference National in 1987.

== Playing career ==
Gane played football between 1964 and 1986. His only Football League appearances were for Hereford United during the 1973–74 season.

== Managerial career ==
Gane turned to football management, between 1986 and 1996.

=== Wycombe Wanderers ===
Gane was manager of Wycombe Wanderers for one season and helped relegated Wycombe achieve its best ever performance in the Isthmian League. They finished top having won 32 games out of 42 and were promoted to the Conference National again. He resigned shortly before the start of the next season partly due to a changing situation at work and partly due to a dispute with the chairman over some proposed signings.
