= Len Worley =

English footballer (born 1937)

Personal information
- Full name: Leonard Francis Worley
- Date of birth: 26 June 1937 (age 89)
- Place of birth: Chalfont St Peter, England
- Position: Winger

Senior career*
Years	Team	Apps	(Gls)
1954–1956	Wycombe Wanderers	44	(3)
1956	Charlton Athletic	1	(0)
1956–1959	Wycombe Wanderers	34	(5)
1959	Tottenham Hotspur	1	(0)
1959–1969	Wycombe Wanderers	285	(37)
1969–?	Chesham United		
- Wealdstone
1970	Slough Town	6	(1)
1970–?	Hayes		
- * Club domestic league appearances and goals

Leonard Francis Worley (born 26 June 1937) is a former amateur footballer who played for Wycombe Wanderers, Charlton Athletic, Tottenham Hotspur, Chesham United, Wealdstone, Slough Town, Hayes and represented England at amateur level on seven occasions.

== Playing career ==
Worley began his career with Wycombe Wanderers as a sixteen-year-old in 1954. The right winger became known as the "Stanley Matthews of amateur football " and dedicated much of his career to the Buckinghamshire club. Like his namesake his dribbling skills coupled with accurate crosses helped the club to two Isthmian League titles in 1955–56 and 1956–57. His two-goal display in the FA Amateur Cup semi-final at Highbury took the Loakes Park club to the 1956–57 final. Worley joined Charlton Athletic as an amateur in October 1956 and played one senior match for the Valley based team. He returned to Wycombe Wanderers before joining Tottenham Hotspur. Worley made one appearance for the Spurs in a 3–1 win against Sheffield Wednesday at Hillsborough on 17 October 1959 when he replaced Terry Medwin who was on international duty for Wales. The White Hart Lane club offered him a professional contract in 1959 which the steadfast player refused. In a career that spanned 15 years in which he suffered two broken legs, Worley made 512 appearances and scored 67 goals. He finally left the Chairboys in 1969. Worley continued to play as an amateur with spells at Chesham, Wealdstone, Slough and Hayes before retiring from competitive football in the mid-1970s.

== Post–football career ==
After retirement Worley kept his football interest by turning out for his local club Chalfont. He is also a keen tennis player in the Bucks area. He became a property developer and owned a sports shop. Worley is a regular visitor to Adams Park, home of Wycombe Wanderers.
