= John Delaney (footballer) =

English footballer (1942–2026)

Personal information
- Full name: John Joseph Delaney
- Date of birth: 3 February 1942
- Place of birth: Slough, England
- Date of death: 15 September 2026 (aged 84)
- Position: Defender

Youth career
- Queens Park Rangers

Senior career*
Years	Team	Apps	(Gls)
1963–1969	Slough Town	130	(27)
1969–1973	Wycombe Wanderers	136	(46)
1973–1975	Bournemouth	25	(0)
1975–1976	Wycombe Wanderers	32	(2)
1976–1977	Hayes		
- Sutton United
- Hampton
- Tring Town
- Oxford City

International career
1969–1973	England Amateurs	17	(6)

Managerial career
- Tring Town
- Oxford City
- * Club domestic league appearances and goals

John Joseph Delaney (4 February 1942 – 15 September 2026) was an English professional footballer who played as a defender.

== Club career ==
Delaney began his career in the youth ranks at Queens Park Rangers. In 1963, Delaney signed for hometown club Slough Town initially as a goalkeeper, after a spells at numerous Slough & District League clubs. Whilst at Slough, Delaney changed positions, becoming a defender, later captaining the club, scoring 52 goals in 243 appearances in all competitions. In 1969, Delaney signed for Wycombe Wanderers. During his time at Wycombe, Delaney captained the club to two Isthmian League titles, before departing in 1973 to sign for Football League side Bournemouth. Across two seasons at Bournemouth, Delaney made 25 league appearances, before rejoining Wycombe in 1975. At the end of the 1975–76 season, following 228 appearances and 65 goals in all competitions for Wycombe, Delaney departed the club, joining Hayes.

Following time at Hayes, Delaney played for Sutton United and Hampton, before undertaking a player-manager role at both Tring Town and Oxford City, succeeding Bobby Moore as manager at Oxford City in 1981.

== International career ==
From 1969 to 1973, Delaney made 17 appearances for England amateurs, scoring six times.

== Death ==
Delaney died on 15 September 2026, aged 84.
