= Hayes F.C. =

- Full name: Hayes Football Club
- Nickname: The Missioners
- Founded: 1909; 117 years ago (as Botwell Mission)
- Dissolved: 2007; 19 years ago
- Ground: Church Road
- Capacity: 4,730 (500 seated)
- 2006–07: Conference South, 19th
Home colours	Away colours

Hayes Football Club was an English association football club based in Hayes, Middlesex. In 2007, the club merged with Yeading to form Hayes & Yeading United.

== History ==
Botwell Mission, in 1910/11

Hayes were formed in 1909 by Eileen Shackle, who wished to create a club to encourage boys to participate in sport as well as encourage their religious convictions. Their original name, Botwell Mission, derived from the fact that they changed at the small mission church and stored their kit there.

The club adopted the name Hayes F.C. after a special general meeting of the club took place on 30 January 1929. The team nickname, The Missioners, was a salute to the history of the team

The club was runner-up in the FA Amateur Cup to Wycombe Wanderers in 1931. Approximately 32,000 watched Hayes succumb to a late goal at Highbury.

After winning the Isthmian League in 1996, Hayes had a six-year stint in the Conference National, spanning from 1996 to 2002. They achieved their highest league-finish in 1999, ending the season in third place just seven points away from promotion to the Football League, via a Conference championship.

Hayes reached the FA Cup second-round on four occasions; in the FA Trophy they reached the quarter-finals twice.

The club claimed some respectable cup triumphs, among the most noteworthy being those against Fulham a 2–0 win at Craven Cottage in November 1991, Bristol Rovers 1–0 in 1972-73 and Cardiff City 1–0, in a replay staged at Brentford in November 1990. In 1999 they missed out on a lucrative third-round tie with Chelsea after defeat in extra time to Hull City. An FA Cup tie against Reading in 1972 brought Missioners player Robin Friday to the attention of a wider public, and he was signed by Reading soon after. Friday was voted Reading and Cardiff City's 'Cult Hero' on the BBC's Football Focus.

Church Road saw the start of the career of a number of players who went on to higher levels, among them Les Ferdinand, Cyrille Regis, Blackburn Rovers striker Jason Roberts, Crewe Alexandra's Justin Cochrane and French goalkeeper Bertrand Bossu, who famously scored an injury time equaliser at St Albans City in February 2003.

The club played in the Conference South for their last few seasons in existence. The club's last manager was Kevin Hill, who got the job on a full-time basis after successfully steering the team clear of relegation after the departure of Willy Wordsworth towards the end of the 2006–07 season. Wordsworth had been unable to emulate the success of his predecessor, the highly regarded Terry Brown, who left to take a vacancy at Aldershot Town in 2002.

Hayes merged with Yeading F.C. on 18 May 2007 to form the new club Hayes & Yeading United, who continued to play in the Conference South.

== Stadium ==
Their home stadium was Church Road which seated 500 with a total capacity of 6,500. The record attendance at this ground was 15,370 – for an Amateur Cup tie against Bromley in 1951.

== Kit ==
The team was recognised by their red and white striped shirt.

== Honours ==
- Middlesex Senior Cup
  - Winners (9): 1919–20, 1920–21, 1925–26, 1930–31, 1935–36, 1949–50, 1981–82, 1995–96, 1999–2000
  - Runners-up (10): 1922–23, 1936–37, 1939–40, 1948–49, 1950–51, 1967–68, 1980–81, 1986–87, 2005–06, 2006–07
- Middlesex Senior Charity Cup
  - Winners (15): 1920–21, 1922–23, 1923–24, 1925–26, 1928–29, 1932–33, 1933–34, 1948–49, 1954–55, 1962–63, 1970–71, 1971–72, 1972–73, 1974–75, 1990–91
  - Runners-up (7): 1921–22, 1938–39, 1947–48, 1958–59, 1963–64, 1964–65, 1979–80
- Great Western Suburban League
  - Winners (4): 1920–21,1921–22,1922–23,1923–24
  - Runners-up (1): 1919–20
- Spartan League Division 1
  - Winners (1): 1927–28
  - Runners-up (1): 1925–26
- Athenian League
  - Winners (1): 1956–57
  - Runners-up (2): 1931–32, 1949–50
- Isthmian League Premier Division
  - Winners (1): 1995–96

== Records ==
- FA Cup best performance: second round proper replay – 1972–73, 1999–2000
- FA Trophy best performance: quarter-finals – 1978–79, 1997–98
- FA Amateur Cup best performance: runners-up – 1930–31
