= Simon Stapleton =

English footballer

Personal information
- Full name: Simon John Stapleton
- Date of birth: 10 December 1968 (age 57)
- Place of birth: Oxford, England
- Position: Midfielder

Senior career*
Years	Team	Apps	(Gls)
1986–1988	Portsmouth	0	(0)
1988–1989	Bristol Rovers	5	(0)
1989–1996	Wycombe Wanderers	49	(3)
1996–1997	Slough Town	24	(3)
1997	Rushden & Diamonds	10	(2)
1997–1998	Stevenage Borough	4	(0)
- * Club domestic league appearances and goals

Simon John Stapleton (born 10 December 1968) is an English former professional footballer who played as a midfielder. He spent the majority of his career at Wycombe Wanderers.

Born in Oxford, Stapleton started his career as an apprentice at Portsmouth, before joining Bristol Rovers in 1988, where he made his Football League debut. He joined Conference side Wycombe Wanderers in 1989, where he helped the team win promotion to the Football League in 1992–93. During the same season, Wycombe also reached the final of the FA Trophy, but Stapleton did not play after failing a late fitness test.

After making 49 League appearances for the club, he left Wycombe in 1996 and went on to have brief spells with non-League clubs Slough Town and Rushden & Diamonds. He finished his career with Stevenage Borough, where he played against Premier League side Newcastle United in the fourth round of the 1997–98 FA Cup.

== Honours ==
Wycombe Wanderers

- FA Trophy: 1990–91
