= Glyn Creaser =

English footballer

Personal information
- Full name: Glyn Robert Creaser
- Date of birth: 1 September 1959 (age 67)
- Place of birth: Camden, England
- Position: Defender

Senior career*
| Years | Team | Apps | (Gls) |
| 1983–1984 | Kettering Town | 8 | (0) |
| 1984–1988 | Barnet | 123 | (7) |
| 1988–1995 | Wycombe Wanderers | 181 | (14) |
| 1993–1994 | → Yeovil Town (loan) | 4 | (0) |
| 1995–1996 | Rushden & Diamonds | 9 | (0) |
| 1996–1997 | Dagenham & Redbridge | ? | (?) |

Managerial career
- 2015–2017: Aylesbury United
- * Club domestic league appearances and goals

Glyn Robert Creaser (born 1 September 1959) is an English former professional footballer who played as a defender in the Football League, and is now a manager.

== Career ==
Having worked as a coach at a number of clubs, including New Bradwell St Peter, in 2010, Creaser took up the role of first team coach at Aylesbury United, and in October 2015 he was appointed as the club's manager. He left the club in December 2017.

Creaser is currently on the coaching staff at Spartan South Midlands Football League club Milton Keynes Irish F.C.

== Personal life ==
He has a wife and three daughters. His daughters have supported Glyn throughout his career in football and afterwards. Claire and Megan have been there as much as possible. His wife, Andrea Creaser, has been a constant support throughout his career.

== Honours ==
Wycombe Wanderers

- Football League Third Division play-offs: 1994
- FA Trophy: 1990–91
