= Tony Horseman =

English footballer

Tony 'Bodger' Horseman
Personal information
- Full name: Anthony Horseman
- Date of birth: 12 May 1941 (age 85)
- Place of birth: High Wycombe, England
- Position: Forward

Senior career*
Years	Team	Apps	(Gls)
1961–1978	Wycombe Wanderers	749	(416)
- * Club domestic league appearances and goals

Tony 'Bodger' Horseman (born 1941) is a former amateur and semi-professional footballer who played for Wycombe Wanderers, and represented England and Great Britain at amateur level. He holds the club's all-time leading goalscorer and appearance records, with 416 goals in 749 appearances. In addition he made approximately 200 non-first team appearances. The Wycombe Wanderers club mascot 'Bodger' is named after him.

== Playing career ==
Horseman began his career with East End United and Wallaby Sports before joining Wycombe Wanderers as a twenty-year-old in 1961. He made his debut as a left winger in a 3–2 defeat at Oxford City and soon become a regular first team player at centre forward. He worked at the Healy WH Limited furniture factory at the time and was associated with the furniture trade throughout his career — earning the nickname 'Bodger' after the local term for skilled wood turners.

His notable achievements include scoring 60 goals in just 51 first team appearances during the 1966/67 season.

He played for Great Britain in November 1967 under Charles Hughes against West Germany in an Olympic games qualifier.

He was part of the Wycombe side that dominated the Isthmian league in the early 1970s, winning in 1970–71, 1971–72, 1973–74, 1974–75.

In 1974/75 he was part of the Wycombe Wanderers team that reached the third round of the FA Cup for the first time, playing against first division Middlesbrough, then top of the table and managed by Jack Charlton. The game at Loakes Park was covered by London Weekend Television's Big Match cameras and Boro scraped a 0–0 draw. The side travelled up to Ayresome Park for the replay and a 30,128 crowd saw the semi-pros hold out until the last minute when David Armstrong slipped the ball past Wycombe goalkeeper John Maskell and into the bottom corner of the net.

In 1975/76 he played in both legs of the two-legged final tie in the Anglo-Italian Semi-Professional Trophy against A.C. Monza, which Wycombe won 2–1 on aggregate.

He had opportunities to turn professional, including the offer of a trial at Brian Clough's Nottingham Forest, but was never interested in the professional game. He was known throughout his career for a dislike of training and a fondness for Rothmans cigarettes. His last match for Wycombe was against Sutton United in the 1977/78 season.
