= 1969–70 Brentford F.C. season =

English football team season

Brentford
1969–70 season
- Chairman: Walter Wheatley
- Manager: Jimmy Sirrel (until 10 November 1969); Ron Fenton (10 November 1969 – December 1969); Frank Blunstone (from December 1969)
- Stadium: Griffin Park
- Fourth Division: 5th
- FA Cup: First round
- League Cup: First round
- Top goalscorer: League: Ross (13); All: Ross (13)
- Highest home attendance: 12,261
- Lowest home attendance: 4,383
- Average home league attendance: 7,773
Home colours

During the 1969–70 English football season, Brentford competed in the Football League Fourth Division. Despite staying in the promotion places throughout much of the campaign, three-late season defeats cost the Bees promotion to the Third Division.

== Season summary ==
There was the perception around Griffin Park during the 1969 off-season that after the financial austerity of the previous two-and-a-half years, the extreme cost-cutting measures enacted by former chairman Ron Blindell had reduced Brentford's target to merely staying in business, rather than challenging for promotion to the Third Division. Former director Walter Wheatley's loans to the club had taken its debts down to a manageable proportion, but after being installed as chairman (Blindell had died in January 1969), Wheatley carried on the austerity into the 1969–70 season. Manager Jimmy Sirrel once again had his hands tied in the transfer market, releasing experienced campaigners Denis Hunt, Pat Terry and Ron Foster and bringing in three attackers, two on free transfers (Bill Brown and Micky Cook) and one on trial (Roger Frude).

From the point of view of manpower, Brentford began the season in the worst possible way, with just 14 fit players. Despite the early-season transfer of the versatile John Richardson to rivals Fulham for £10,000, Brentford had an excellent start to the season, with goals from Allan Mansley, Bobby Ross and Micky Cook helping the club stabilise its position in the promotion places. The number of fit players dropped to 13 by October 1969, with the lack of a recognised centre forward being the problem. On 10 November, manager Jimmy Sirrel dropped the bombshell that he was leaving the club to take up the manager's position at Notts County. Forward Ron Fenton took over as caretaker manager and though the Bees exited the FA Cup in the first round (quickly ending any chances of a money-spinning cup run), Fenton managed to keep the club in and around the promotion places before Frank Blunstone was installed as manager just prior to Christmas 1969.

Despite an inconsistent first month under new manager Frank Blunstone, Brentford continued to keep pace with the promotion race. Blunstone was able to expand the squad slightly, with midfielders Brian Turner and Brian Tawse signing on a permanent basis and forward Alan Cocks coming in on loan to replace departed loanee Gerry Baker. Ever-present goalkeeper Chic Brodie had his best season so far at Griffin Park and kept 20 clean sheets. The Bees moved as high as 2nd position in late January and early February 1970 and manager Blunstone went for broke, finally signing a recognised centre forward (Roger Cross from West Ham United for £10,000) and bringing winger John Docherty back for a third spell with the club. Three defeats in four matches in late March and early April effectively ended the promotion charge, with the three-point gap to 4th-place Port Vale proving to be insurmountable.

Two records were set during the season, which as of 2025 have never been bettered:

- Least Football League goals conceded in a season: 39
- Least home Football League goals conceded in a season: 11

== League table ==
Pos	Team	Pld	W	D	L	GF	GA	GAv	Pts	Promotion or relegation
3	Swansea City (P)	46	21	18	7	66	45	1.467	60	Promotion to the Third Division
4	Port Vale (P)	46	20	19	7	61	33	1.848	59	Promotion to the Third Division
5	Brentford	46	20	16	10	58	39	1.487	56	
6	Aldershot	46	20	13	13	78	65	1.200	53	Qualified for the Watney Cup (Note: The two teams who scored the most goals in each division, and did not qualify for Europe and were not promoted, qualified for the Watney Cup.)
7	Notts County	46	22	8	16	73	62	1.177	52	

Source: rsssf.com
(P) Promoted

== Results ==
Brentford's goal tally listed first.

=== Legend ===
Win	Draw	Loss

=== Football League Fourth Division ===
No.	Date	Opponent	Venue	Result	Attendance	Scorer(s)
1	9 August 1969	Hartlepool	A	0–0	3,020	
2	16 August 1969	Notts County	H	1–0	6,364	Mansley (2)
3	23 August 1969	Crewe Alexandra	A	2–1	3,051	Renwick, Cook
4	27 August 1969	Chester	A	2–1	4,426	Dobson, Ross
5	30 August 1969	Darlington	H	1–1	7,442	Dobson
6	6 September 1969	Newport County	A	0–1	3,219	
7	13 September 1969	Swansea City	H	2–2	7,139	Mansley, Ross (pen)
8	15 September 1969	Southend United	H	3–1	7,446	Mansley, Neilson, Fenton
9	20 September 1969	Bradford Park Avenue	A	1–0	2,887	Ross
10	27 September 1969	Wrexham	H	0–0	8,610	
11	29 September 1969	Lincoln City	H	2–1	8,210	Gelson, Cook
12	4 October 1969	Workington	A	2–1	1,882	Mansley, Ross
13	8 October 1969	Notts County	A	0–1	4,664	
14	11 October 1969	Scunthorpe United	H	3–0	7,493	Cook, Mansley (2)
15	18 October 1969	Oldham Athletic	H	1–1	8,674	Cook
16	25 October 1969	Chesterfield	A	0–1	11,212	
17	1 November 1969	Peterborough United	H	5–2	8,650	Baker, Wile (og), Ross, Higginson, Fenton
18	8 November 1969	Exeter City	A	2–2	4,897	Renwick (2)
19	22 November 1969	Northampton Town	A	1–1	5,315	Dobson
20	24 November 1969	Grimsby Town	H	3–0	7,647	Baker, Ross, Mansley
21	13 December 1969	Swansea City	A	0–1	7,423	
22	20 December 1969	Newport County	H	1–0	4,383	Ross
23	26 December 1969	Crewe Alexandra	H	1–1	9,307	Ross
24	27 December 1969	Darlington	A	2–1	2,507	Fenton, Ross
25	3 January 1970	Lincoln City	A	0–1	4,991	
26	10 January 1970	Bradford Park Avenue	H	1–1	5,847	Fenton
27	17 January 1970	Wrexham	A	0–1	8,451	
28	24 January 1970	Port Vale	H	1–0	8,661	Boulton (og)
29	31 January 1970	Workington	H	1–0	7,756	Dobson
30	10 February 1970	Scunthorpe United	A	1–1	5,316	Gelson
31	21 February 1970	Chesterfield	H	0–1	10,540	
32	23 February 1970	Hartlepool	H	3–0	7,352	Gelson, Turner, Hawley
33	28 February 1970	Peterborough United	A	0–0	7,512	
34	7 March 1970	Northampton Town	H	1–0	7,292	Cocks
35	9 March 1970	York City	H	0–0	8,124	
36	14 March 1970	Colchester United	A	1–1	4,878	Ross
37	16 March 1970	Port Vale	A	0–0	7,947	
38	21 March 1970	Aldershot	H	0–0	12,261	
39	27 March 1970	Exeter City	H	2–0	10,110	Cross, Ross (pen)
40	28 March 1970	York City	A	2–4	2,496	Docherty, Neilson
41	31 March 1970	Oldham Athletic	A	1–4	5,078	Cocks
42	4 April 1970	Chester	H	2–0	4,750	Gelson, Docherty
43	7 April 1970	Grimsby Town	A	1–2	3,582	Cross
44	13 April 1970	Southend United	A	2–2	6,433	Neilson, Ross
45	18 April 1970	Colchester United	H	2–0	4,720	Renwick, Docherty
46	24 April 1970	Aldershot	A	2–1	7,492	Cross (2)

=== FA Cup ===
Round	Date	Opponent	Venue	Result	Attendance
1R	15 November 1969	Plymouth Argyle	H	0–0	9,963
1R (replay)	19 November 1969	Plymouth Argyle	A	0–2	11,554

=== Football League Cup ===
Round	Date	Opponent	Venue	Result	Attendance	Scorer(s)	Notes
1R	12 August 1969	Southend United	A	2–2	9,256	Mansley (2)	
1R (replay)	18 August 1969	Southend United	H	0–0 (a.e.t.)	7,941		
1R (2nd replay)	21 August 1969	Southend United	N	2–3 (a.e.t.)	2,068	Mansley, Gelson	(Note: Match played at The Den, London.)

- Sources: 100 Years Of Brentford, Statto

== Playing squad ==
Players' ages are as of the opening day of the 1969–70 season.

Pos.	Name	Nat.	Date of birth (age)	Signed from	Signed in	Notes
Goalkeepers
GK	Chic Brodie	(Scotland)	22 February 1937 (aged 32)	Northampton Town	1963	
Defenders
DF	Peter Gelson	(England)	18 October 1941 (aged 27)	Youth	1961	
DF	Alan Hawley	(England)	7 June 1946 (aged 23)	Youth	1962	
DF	Tommy Higginson	(Scotland)	6 January 1937 (aged 32)	Kilmarnock	1959	
DF	Allan Jones	(Wales)	6 January 1940 (aged 29)	Liverpool	1963	
DF	Alan Nelmes	(England)	20 October 1948 (aged 20)	Chelsea	1967	
DF	Dick Renwick	(England)	27 November 1942 (aged 26)	Aldershot	1969	
Midfielders
MF	George Dobson	(England)	24 August 1949 (aged 19)	Youth	1966	
MF	John Docherty	(Scotland)	29 April 1940 (aged 29)	Reading	1970	
MF	Allan Mansley	(England)	31 August 1946 (aged 22)	Blackpool	1968	
MF	Gordon Neilson	(Scotland)	28 May 1947 (aged 22)	Arsenal	1968	
MF	Bobby Ross	(Scotland)	10 May 1942 (aged 27)	Shrewsbury Town	1966	
MF	Brian Tawse	(Scotland)	30 July 1945 (aged 24)	Brighton & Hove Albion	1970	
MF	Brian Turner	(New Zealand)	31 July 1949 (aged 20)	Portsmouth	1970	
Forwards
FW	Micky Cook	(England)	25 January 1950 (aged 19)	Crystal Palace	1969	
FW	Roger Cross	(England)	20 October 1948 (aged 20)	West Ham United	1970	
FW	Ron Fenton (c)	(England)	21 September 1940 (aged 28)	Birmingham City	1968	Assistant manager
Players who left the club mid-season
FW	Gerry Baker	(United States)	11 April 1938 (aged 31)	Coventry City	1969	Returned to Coventry City after loan
FW	Bill Brown	(England)	7 February 1943 (aged 26)	Portsmouth	1969	Released
FW	Alan Cocks	(England)	7 May 1951 (aged 18)	Chelsea	1969	Returned to Chelsea after loan
FW	Roger Frude	(England)	19 November 1946 (aged 22)	Mansfield Town	1969	Released
FW	David Harney	(England)	2 March 1947 (aged 22)	Scunthorpe United	1969	Released
FW	John Richardson	(England)	5 February 1949 (aged 20)	Millwall	1966	Transferred to Fulham

- Sources: 100 Years Of Brentford, Timeless Bees

== Coaching staff ==
=== Jimmy Sirrel (10 August – 10 November 1969) ===
Name	Role
(Scotland) Jimmy Sirrel	Manager
(England) Ron Fenton	Assistant Manager
(England) Eddie Lyons	Physiotherapist

=== Ron Fenton (10 November – December 1969) ===
Name	Role
(England) Ron Fenton	Caretaker Manager
(England) Eddie Lyons	Physiotherapist

=== Frank Blunstone (December 1969 – 24 April 1970) ===
Name	Role
(England) Frank Blunstone	Manager
(England) Ron Fenton	Assistant Manager
(England) Eddie Lyons	Physiotherapist

== Statistics ==
=== Appearances and goals ===
Substitute appearances in brackets.

Pos	Nat	Name	League		FA Cup		League Cup		Total	
Pos	Nat	Name	Apps	Goals	Apps	Goals	Apps	Goals	Apps	Goals
GK	(Scotland)	Chic Brodie	46	0	2	0	3	0	51	0
DF	(England)	Peter Gelson	43	4	2	0	3	1	48	5
DF	(England)	Alan Hawley	46	1	1	0	3	0	50	1
DF	(Scotland)	Tommy Higginson	39 (1)	1	2	0	3	0	44 (1)	0
DF	(Wales)	Allan Jones	9 (3)	0	1	0	0	0	10 (3)	0
DF	(England)	Alan Nelmes	45	0	2	0	3	0	50	0
DF	(England)	Dick Renwick	39	4	2	0	3	0	44	4
MF	(England)	George Dobson	15 (5)	4	0 (1)	0	1 (1)	0	16 (7)	4
MF	(Scotland)	John Docherty	11	3	—		—		11	3
MF	(England)	Allan Mansley	26	6	2	0	3	3	31	9
MF	(Scotland)	Gordon Neilson	33 (1)	3	2	0	3	0	38 (1)	3
MF	(Scotland)	Bobby Ross	46	13	2	0	3	0	51	13
MF	(Scotland)	Brian Tawse	13	0	—		—		13	0
MF	(New Zealand)	Brian Turner	14 (2)	1	—		—		14 (2)	1
FW	(England)	Bill Brown	4	0	—		—		4	0
FW	(England)	Micky Cook	17 (3)	4	2	0	3	0	22 (3)	4
FW	(England)	Roger Cross	11	4	—		—		11	4
FW	(England)	Ron Fenton	29 (2)	4	2	0	0	0	31 (2)	4
FW	(England)	Roger Frude	1 (1)	0	—		1 (1)	0	2 (2)	0
FW	(England)	David Harney	0 (1)	0	—		—		0 (1)	0
FW	(England)	John Richardson	2	0	—		2	0	4	0
Players loaned in during the season
FW	(United States)	Gerry Baker	8	2	—		—		8	2
FW	(England)	Alan Cocks	11	2	—		—		11	2

- Players listed in italics left the club mid-season.
- Source: 100 Years Of Brentford

=== Goalscorers ===
Pos.	Nat	Player	FL4	FAC	FLC	Total
MF	(Scotland)	Bobby Ross	13	0	0	13
MF	(England)	Allan Mansley	6	0	3	9
DF	(England)	Peter Gelson	4	0	1	5
FW	(England)	Roger Cross	4	—	—	4
FW	(England)	Micky Cook	4	0	0	4
MF	(England)	George Dobson	4	0	0	4
FW	(England)	Ron Fenton	4	0	0	4
DF	(England)	Dick Renwick	4	0	0	4
MF	(Scotland)	John Docherty	3	—	—	3
MF	(Scotland)	Gordon Neilson	3	0	0	3
FW	(United States)	Gerry Baker	2	—	—	2
FW	(England)	Alan Cocks	2	—	—	2
MF	(New Zealand)	Brian Turner	1	—	—	1
DF	(England)	Alan Hawley	1	0	0	1
Opponents			2	0	0	2
Total			58	0	4	62

- Players listed in italics left the club mid-season.
- Source: 100 Years Of Brentford

=== Management ===
Name	Nat	From	To	Record All Comps					Record League				
Name	Nat	From	To	P	W	D	L	W %	P	W	D	L	W %
Jimmy Sirrel	(Scotland)	9 August 1969	8 November 1969	21	9	8	4	42.86	18	9	6	3	50.00
Ron Fenton (caretaker)	(England)	15 November 1969	20 December 1969	6	2	2	2	33.33	4	2	1	1	50.00
Frank Blunstone	(England)	26 December 1969	24 April 1970	24	9	9	6	37.50	24	9	9	6	37.50

=== Summary ===
Games played	51 (46 Fourth Division, 2 FA Cup, 3 League Cup)
Games won	20 (20 Fourth Division, 0 FA Cup, 0 League Cup)
Games drawn	19 (16 Fourth Division, 1 FA Cup, 2 League Cup)
Games lost	12 (10 Fourth Division, 1 FA Cup, 1 League Cup)
Goals scored	62 (58 Fourth Division, 0 FA Cup, 4 League Cup)
Goals conceded	46 (39 Fourth Division, 2 FA Cup, 5 League Cup)
Clean sheets	20 (18 Fourth Division, 1 FA Cup, 1 League Cup)
Biggest league win	3–0 on three occasions; 5–2 versus Peterborough United, 1 November 1969
Worst league defeat	4–1 versus Oldham Athletic, 31 March 1970
Most appearances	51, Chic Brodie, Bobby Ross (46 Fourth Division, 2 FA Cup, 3 League Cup)
Top scorer (league)	13, Bobby Ross
Top scorer (all competitions)	13, Bobby Ross

== Transfers & loans ==
Players transferred in
Date	Pos.	Name	Previous club	Fee	Ref.
July 1969	FW	(England) Bill Brown	(England) Portsmouth	Free	
July 1969	FW	(England) Roger Frude	(England) Mansfield Town	Trial	
August 1969	FW	(England) Micky Cook	(England) Crystal Palace	Free	
October 1969	FW	(England) Brian Caterer	(England) Leatherhead	Amateur	
October 1969	FW	(England) David Harney	(England) Scunthorpe United	Trial	
1969	MF	(England) Alan Gane	(England) Slough Town	n/a	
January 1970	MF	(New Zealand) Brian Turner	(England) Portsmouth	n/a	
February 1970	MF	(Scotland) Brian Tawse	(England) Brighton & Hove Albion	n/a	
March 1970	FW	(England) Roger Cross	(England) Crystal Palace	£10,000	
March 1970	MF	(Scotland) John Docherty	(England) Reading	n/a	
Players loaned in
Date from	Pos.	Name	From	Date to	Ref.
October 1969	FW	(United States) Gerry Baker	(England) Coventry City	January 1970	
29 January 1970	FW	(England) Alan Cocks	(England) Chelsea	March 1970	
Players transferred out
Date	Pos.	Name	Subsequent club	Fee	Ref.
August 1969	FW	(England) John Richardson	(England) Fulham	£10,000	
Players released
Date	Pos.	Name	Subsequent club	Join date	Ref.
August 1969	FW	(England) Roger Frude	(England) Falmouth Town	3 October 1969	
October 1969	FW	(England) Bill Brown	(England) Margate	1969	
October 1969	FW	(England) Brian Caterer	(England) Leatherhead	October 1969	
October 1969	FW	(England) David Harney	(England) Wimbledon	1969	
April 1970	FW	(England) Micky Cook	(England) Folkestone	1970	
April 1970	MF	(England) George Dobson	(England) Guildford City	1970	
April 1970	FW	(England) Ron Fenton	Retired		
April 1970	DF	(Scotland) Tommy Higginson	(England) Hillingdon Borough	1970	
April 1970	DF	(Wales) Allan Jones	(Australia) Croatia	1970	
