= 1968–69 Brentford F.C. season =

English football team season

Brentford
1968–69 season
- Chairman: Ron Blindell
- Manager: Jimmy Sirrel
- Stadium: Griffin Park
- Fourth Division: 11th
- FA Cup: Second round
- League Cup: Third round
- Top goalscorer: League: Mansley (14); All: Mansley (17)
- Highest home attendance: 17,425
- Lowest home attendance: 3,361
- Average home league attendance: 6,419
Home colours

During the 1968–69 English football season, Brentford competed in the Football League Fourth Division. Off the back of 18 months of extreme financial problems, the club finished in mid-table.

== Season summary ==
After two tumultuous seasons off the pitch, a continued cash crisis meant that during the 1968 off-season, Brentford manager Jimmy Sirrel would not be provided with the funds to buy players who could guarantee a lasting run at promotion from the Fourth Division. He was able to plug the gaps in his threadbare squad, bringing in full back Denis Hunt and journeyman forwards Pat Terry and Peter Deakin. A need to balance the books led to Ian Lawther (one of the club's most consistent goalscorers since the 1964–65 season) being sold for a £3,000 fee a matter of days before the beginning of the season.

Manager Sirrel's young team began the season in promising form, losing just two of the first 15 league matches to consolidate a position in the top six. Brentford's position belied the club's personnel problems, with a growing catalogue of injuries, illness and suspensions. £10,000 was spent on Arsenal winger Gordon Neilson in October 1968, an extravagant amount given Brentford's financial problems. An inconsistent spell between November 1968 and April 1969 dropped the Bees as low as 19th, two places above the re-election zone, but six wins in the final seven matches of the season lifted the club to an 11th-place finish.

== League table ==
| Pos | Team | Pld | W | D | L | GF | GA | GAv | Pts |
|---|---|---|---|---|---|---|---|---|---|
| 9 | Wrexham | 46 | 18 | 14 | 14 | 61 | 52 | 1.173 | 50 |
| 10 | Swansea Town | 46 | 19 | 11 | 16 | 58 | 54 | 1.074 | 49 |
| 11 | Brentford | 46 | 18 | 12 | 16 | 64 | 65 | 0.985 | 48 |
| 12 | Workington | 46 | 15 | 17 | 14 | 40 | 43 | 0.930 | 47 |
| 13 | Port Vale | 46 | 16 | 14 | 16 | 46 | 46 | 1.000 | 46 |

Source: rsssf.com
Rules for classification: 1) points; 2) goal average; 3) number of goals scored.

== Results ==
Brentford's goal tally listed first.

=== Legend ===
| Win | Draw | Loss |

=== Pre-season ===
| Date | Opponent | Venue | Result | Scorer(s) |
|---|---|---|---|---|
| 27 July 1968 | West Ham United | H | 1–0 | Dobson |

=== Football League Fourth Division ===
| No. | Date | Opponent | Venue | Result | Attendance | Scorer(s) |
|---|---|---|---|---|---|---|
| 1 | 10 August 1968 | Colchester United | H | 4–0 | 7,586 | Deakin, Moughton (og), Terry, Ross |
| 2 | 17 August 1968 | Scunthorpe United | A | 1–1 | 3,685 | Terry |
| 3 | 24 August 1968 | Port Vale | H | 3–1 | 7,443 | Mansley, Fenton (2) |
| 4 | 26 August 1968 | Rochdale | H | 1–1 | 9,149 | Deakin |
| 5 | 31 August 1968 | Exeter City | A | 2–2 | 8,835 | Terry, Richardson |
| 6 | 7 September 1968 | Chesterfield | H | 1–0 | 9,703 | Fenton |
| 7 | 14 September 1968 | Peterborough United | A | 1–2 | 6,435 | Dobson |
| 8 | 18 September 1968 | Chester | A | 2–2 | 8,410 | Terry, Ross |
| 9 | 21 September 1968 | York City | H | 5–1 | 8,360 | Carr (og), Terry (3), Ross |
| 10 | 28 September 1968 | Bradford City | A | 0–3 | 6,491 | |
| 11 | 5 October 1968 | Newport County | H | 1–1 | 7,825 | Mansley |
| 12 | 7 October 1968 | Rochdale | A | 0–0 | 5,181 | |
| 13 | 12 October 1968 | Swansea Town | A | 3–2 | 6,912 | Neilson, Terry, Fenton |
| 14 | 19 October 1968 | Wrexham | H | 1–1 | 7,791 | Mansley |
| 15 | 26 October 1968 | Notts County | A | 2–0 | 4,173 | Mansley (2) |
| 16 | 2 November 1968 | Aldershot | H | 2–4 | 9,806 | Mansley, Higginson |
| 17 | 4 November 1968 | Darlington | H | 0–1 | 8,550 | |
| 18 | 9 November 1968 | Lincoln City | A | 0–1 | 6,121 | |
| 19 | 23 November 1968 | Bradford Park Avenue | A | 2–0 | 2,341 | Fenton, Kirby |
| 20 | 30 November 1968 | Halifax Town | H | 1–1 | 6,002 | Mansley |
| 21 | 14 December 1968 | Swansea Town | H | 2–1 | 4,321 | Terry, Hawley |
| 22 | 21 December 1968 | Wrexham | A | 0–2 | 4,867 | |
| 23 | 26 December 1968 | Newport County | A | 1–1 | 3,750 | Gelson |
| 24 | 4 January 1969 | Workington | H | 0–3 | 6,081 | |
| 25 | 11 January 1969 | Aldershot | A | 2–1 | 9,280 | Mansley (2) |
| 26 | 18 January 1969 | Lincoln City | H | 2–2 | 6,572 | Terry, Ross |
| 27 | 25 January 1969 | Darlington | A | 1–3 | 5,184 | Dobson |
| 28 | 31 January 1969 | Southend United | A | 0–4 | 10,969 | |
| 29 | 22 February 1969 | Grimsby Town | H | 4–2 | 5,697 | Richardson, Neilson (2), Terry |
| 30 | 28 February 1969 | Colchester United | A | 1–2 | 7,268 | Neilson |
| 31 | 5 March 1969 | Workington | A | 0–1 | 2,318 | |
| 32 | 8 March 1969 | Scunthorpe United | H | 2–1 | 5,456 | Neilson, Nelmes |
| 33 | 10 March 1969 | Southend United | H | 1–1 | 6,030 | Terry |
| 34 | 15 March 1969 | Port Vale | A | 1–4 | 4,478 | Ross (pen) |
| 35 | 22 March 1969 | Exeter City | H | 0–1 | 5,242 | |
| 36 | 26 March 1969 | Notts County | H | 0–0 | 3,361 | |
| 37 | 29 March 1969 | Chesterfield | A | 2–1 | 3,261 | Mansley, Neilson |
| 38 | 8 April 1969 | Doncaster Rovers | A | 0–5 | 11,561 | |
| 39 | 12 April 1969 | York City | A | 1–2 | 3,767 | Mansley |
| 40 | 14 April 1969 | Doncaster Rovers | H | 1–0 | 4,222 | Richardson |
| 41 | 19 April 1969 | Peterborough United | H | 2–0 | 4,492 | Fenton, Mansley |
| 42 | 21 April 1969 | Bradford Park Avenue | H | 3–0 | 4,137 | Fenton (2), Ross (pen) |
| 43 | 28 April 1969 | Halifax Town | A | 0–2 | 6,948 | |
| 44 | 30 April 1969 | Chester | H | 2–1 | 4,090 | Mansley, Fenton |
| 45 | 3 May 1969 | Grimsby Town | A | 2–0 | 1,672 | Gelson, Dobson |
| 46 | 5 May 1969 | Bradford City | H | 2–1 | 5,720 | Richardson, Mansley |

=== FA Cup ===
| Round | Date | Opponent | Venue | Result | Attendance | Scorer(s) | Notes |
|---|---|---|---|---|---|---|---|
| 1R | 16 November 1968 | Woking | H | 2–0 | 5,990 | Fenton, Ross | (Note: Both teams played in change colours, with Brentford borrowing Watford's home shirts for the match.) |
| 2R | 7 December 1968 | Watford | A | 0–1 | 12,883 | | |

=== Football League Cup ===
| Round | Date | Opponent | Venue | Result | Attendance | Scorer(s) |
|---|---|---|---|---|---|---|
| 1R | 14 August 1968 | Aldershot | A | 4–2 | 5,977 | Rafferty (og), Deakin, Mansley, Terry |
| 2R | 4 September 1969 | Hull City | H | 3–0 | 11,485 | Mansley (2), Fenton |
| 3R | 24 September 1969 | Norwich City | H | 0–2 | 17,425 | |

- Sources: 100 Years Of Brentford, Statto

== Playing squad ==
Players' ages are as of the opening day of the 1968–69 season.

| Pos. | Name | Nat. | Date of birth (age) | Signed from | Signed in | Notes |
Goalkeepers
| GK | Chic Brodie | (Scotland) | 22 February 1937 (aged 31) | Northampton Town | 1963 | |
| GK | Gordon Phillips | (England) | 17 November 1946 (aged 21) | Hayes | 1963 | Loaned to Queens Park Rangers |
Defenders
| DF | Peter Gelson | (England) | 18 October 1941 (aged 26) | Youth | 1961 | |
| DF | Alan Hawley | (England) | 7 June 1946 (aged 22) | Youth | 1962 | |
| DF | Tommy Higginson | (Scotland) | 6 January 1937 (aged 31) | Kilmarnock | 1959 | |
| DF | Denis Hunt | (England) | 8 September 1937 (aged 30) | Gillingham | 1968 | |
| DF | Allan Jones | (Wales) | 6 January 1940 (aged 28) | Liverpool | 1963 | |
| DF | Alan Nelmes | (England) | 20 October 1948 (aged 19) | Chelsea | 1967 | |
| DF | Dick Renwick | (England) | 27 November 1942 (aged 25) | Aldershot | 1969 | |
Midfielders
| MF | George Dobson | (England) | 24 August 1949 (aged 18) | Youth | 1966 | |
| MF | Allan Mansley | (England) | 31 August 1946 (aged 21) | Blackpool | 1968 | |
| MF | Gordon Neilson | (Scotland) | 28 May 1947 (aged 21) | Arsenal | 1968 | |
| MF | John Richardson | (England) | 5 February 1949 (aged 19) | Millwall | 1966 | |
| MF | Bobby Ross | (Scotland) | 10 May 1942 (aged 26) | Shrewsbury Town | 1966 | |
Forwards
| FW | Ron Fenton (c) | (England) | 21 September 1940 (aged 27) | Birmingham City | 1968 | Assistant manager |
| FW | Ron Foster | (England) | 22 November 1938 (aged 29) | Dallas Tornado | 1969 | |
| FW | Pat Terry | (England) | 2 October 1933 (aged 34) | Swindon Town | 1968 | |
Players who left the club mid-season
| GK | Ron Willis | (England) | 27 December 1947 (aged 20) | Charlton Athletic | 1968 | Returned to Charlton Athletic after loan |
| MF | Brian Caterer | (England) | 31 January 1943 (aged 25) | Leatherhead | 1968 | Amateur, released |
| FW | Peter Deakin | (England) | 25 March 1938 (aged 30) | Peterborough United | 1968 | Released |
| FW | Keith Hooker | (England) | 31 January 1950 (aged 18) | Youth | 1965 | Loaned to Brentwood Town, released |
| FW | George Kirby | (England) | 20 December 1933 (aged 34) | New York Generals | 1968 | Transferred to Worcester City |

- Sources: 100 Years Of Brentford, Timeless Bees

== Coaching staff ==
| Name | Role |
|---|---|
| (Scotland) Jimmy Sirrel | Manager |
| (England) Ron Fenton | Assistant Manager |
| (England) Eddie Lyons | Physiotherapist |

== Statistics ==
=== Appearances and goals ===
Substitute appearances in brackets.

| Pos | Nat | Name | League | | FA Cup | | League Cup | | Total | |
| Pos | Nat | Name | Apps | Goals | Apps | Goals | Apps | Goals | Apps | Goals |
|---|---|---|---|---|---|---|---|---|---|---|
| GK | (Scotland) | Chic Brodie | 22 | 0 | 2 | 0 | 1 | 0 | 25 | 0 |
| GK | (England) | Gordon Phillips | 23 | 0 | 0 | 0 | 2 | 0 | 25 | 0 |
| DF | (England) | Peter Gelson | 42 | 2 | 2 | 0 | 3 | 0 | 47 | 2 |
| DF | (England) | Alan Hawley | 8 (2) | 1 | 2 | 0 | 0 | 0 | 10 (2) | 1 |
| DF | (Scotland) | Tommy Higginson | 37 (2) | 1 | 1 | 0 | 3 | 0 | 41 (2) | 1 |
| DF | (England) | Denis Hunt | 12 | 0 | 0 | 0 | 2 | 0 | 14 | 0 |
| DF | (Wales) | Allan Jones | 45 | 0 | 2 | 0 | 3 | 0 | 50 | 0 |
| DF | (England) | Alan Nelmes | 44 | 1 | 2 | 0 | 2 (1) | 0 | 48 (1) | 1 |
| DF | (England) | Dick Renwick | 17 | 0 | — | | — | | 17 | 0 |
| MF | (England) | Brian Caterer | 1 | 0 | — | | — | | 1 | 0 |
| MF | (England) | George Dobson | 22 (6) | 3 | 0 | 0 | 3 | 0 | 25 (6) | 3 |
| MF | (England) | Allan Mansley | 41 | 14 | 2 | 0 | 3 | 3 | 46 | 17 |
| MF | (Scotland) | Gordon Neilson | 23 (4) | 6 | 2 | 0 | — | | 25 (4) | 6 |
| MF | (England) | John Richardson | 41 (1) | 4 | 2 | 0 | 2 | 0 | 45 (1) | 4 |
| MF | (Scotland) | Bobby Ross | 43 (1) | 6 | 2 | 1 | 3 | 0 | 48 (1) | 7 |
| FW | (England) | Peter Deakin | 7 (1) | 2 | — | | 2 | 1 | 9 (1) | 3 |
| FW | (England) | Ron Fenton | 39 (2) | 9 | 2 | 1 | 2 | 1 | 43 (2) | 11 |
| FW | (England) | Ron Foster | 3 (1) | 0 | — | | — | | 3 (1) | 0 |
| FW | (England) | Keith Hooker | 1 | 0 | 0 | 0 | 0 | 0 | 1 | 0 |
| FW | (England) | George Kirby | 5 | 1 | 1 (1) | 0 | — | | 6 (1) | 1 |
| FW | (England) | Pat Terry | 29 | 12 | 0 | 0 | 2 | 1 | 31 | 13 |
Players loaned in during the season
| GK | (England) | Ron Willis | 1 | 0 | — | | — | | 1 | 0 |

- Players listed in italics left the club mid-season.
- Source: 100 Years Of Brentford

=== Goalscorers ===
| Pos. | Nat | Player | FL4 | FAC | FLC | Total |
|---|---|---|---|---|---|---|
| MF | (England) | Allan Mansley | 14 | 0 | 3 | 17 |
| FW | (England) | Pat Terry | 12 | 0 | 1 | 13 |
| FW | (England) | Ron Fenton | 9 | 1 | 1 | 11 |
| MF | (Scotland) | Bobby Ross | 6 | 1 | 0 | 7 |
| MF | (Scotland) | Gordon Neilson | 6 | 0 | — | 6 |
| MF | (England) | John Richardson | 4 | 0 | 0 | 4 |
| MF | (England) | George Dobson | 3 | 0 | 0 | 3 |
| FW | (England) | Peter Deakin | 2 | — | 1 | 3 |
| DF | (England) | Peter Gelson | 2 | 0 | 0 | 2 |
| FW | (England) | George Kirby | 1 | 0 | — | 1 |
| DF | (England) | Alan Hawley | 1 | 0 | 0 | 1 |
| DF | (Scotland) | Tommy Higginson | 1 | 0 | 0 | 1 |
| DF | (England) | Alan Nelmes | 1 | 0 | 0 | 1 |
| Opponents | | | 2 | 0 | 1 | 3 |
| Total | | | 64 | 2 | 7 | 73 |

- Players listed in italics left the club mid-season.
- Source: 100 Years Of Brentford

=== Management ===
| Name | Nat | From | To | Record All Comps | | | | | Record League | | | | |
| Name | Nat | From | To | P | W | D | L | W % | P | W | D | L | W % |
|---|---|---|---|---|---|---|---|---|---|---|---|---|---|
| Jimmy Sirrel | (Scotland) | 10 August 1968 | 5 May 1969 | 51 | 21 | 12 | 18 | 41.18 | 46 | 18 | 12 | 16 | 39.13 |

=== Summary ===
| Games played | 51 (46 Fourth Division, 2 FA Cup, 3 League Cup) |
| Games won | 21 (18 Fourth Division, 1 FA Cup, 2 League Cup) |
| Games drawn | 12 (12 Fourth Division, 0 FA Cup, 0 League Cup) |
| Games lost | 18 (16 Fourth Division, 1 FA Cup, 1 League Cup) |
| Goals scored | 73 (64 Fourth Division, 2 FA Cup, 7 League Cup) |
| Goals conceded | 70 (65 Fourth Division, 1 FA Cup, 4 League Cup) |
| Clean sheets | 12 (10 Fourth Division, 1 FA Cup, 1 League Cup) |
| Biggest league win | 4–0 versus Colchester United, 10 August 1968; 5–1 versus York City, 21 September 1968 |
| Worst league defeat | 5–0 versus Doncaster Rovers, 8 April 1969 |
| Most appearances | 50, Allan Jones (45 Fourth Division, 2 FA Cup, 3 League Cup) |
| Top scorer (league) | 14, Allan Mansley |
| Top scorer (all competitions) | 17, Allan Mansley |

== Transfers & loans ==
Players transferred in
| Date | Pos. | Name | Previous club | Fee | Ref. |
|---|---|---|---|---|---|
| 29 May 1968 | FW | (England) Pat Terry | (England) Swindon Town | n/a | |
| June 1968 | DF | (England) Denis Hunt | (England) Gillingham | Free | |
| July 1968 | MF | (England) Peter Deakin | (England) Peterborough United | n/a | |
| October 1968 | FW | (England) Brian Caterer | (England) Leatherhead | Amateur | |
| October 1968 | FW | (England) George Kirby | (United States) New York Generals | n/a | |
| October 1968 | MF | (Scotland) Gordon Neilson | (England) Arsenal | £10,000 | |
| February 1969 | DF | (England) Dick Renwick | (England) Aldershot | £1,500 | |
| March 1969 | FW | (England) Ron Foster | (United States) Dallas Tornado | Trial | |
Players loaned in
| Date from | Pos. | Name | From | Date to | Ref. |
| September 1968 | GK | (England) Ron Willis | (England) Charlton Athletic | September 1968 | |
Players transferred out
| Date | Pos. | Name | Subsequent club | Fee | Ref. |
| August 1968 | FW | (Northern Ireland) Ian Lawther | (England) Halifax Town | £3,000 | |
| 1968 | FW | (England) George Kirby | (England) Worcester City | n/a | |
Players loaned out
| Date from | Pos. | Name | To | Date to | Ref. |
| 1969 | GK | (England) Gordon Phillips | (England) Queens Park Rangers | 1969 | |
| n/a | FW | (England) Keith Hooker | (England) Brentwood Town | n/a | |
Players released
| Date | Pos. | Name | Subsequent club | Join date | Ref. |
| October 1968 | FW | (England) Brian Caterer | (England) Leatherhead | October 1968 | |
| October 1968 | FW | (England) Peter Deakin | (England) Nuneaton Borough | October 1968 | |
| May 1969 | FW | (England) Ron Foster | Retired | | |
| May 1969 | DF | (England) Denis Hunt | (England) Folkestone | 1969 | |
| May 1969 | FW | (England) Pat Terry | (England) Hillingdon Borough | July 1969 | |
| 1969 | FW | (England) Keith Hooker | (South Africa) Durban Spurs | 1969 | |
