= Michael Cook =

Michael Cook may refer to:

== Sportspeople ==
- Michael Cook (cricketer) (born 1939), English cricketer
- Michael Cook (rugby) (born 1962), Australian rugby union and rugby league player
- Mike Cook (baseball) (born 1963), retired baseball player
- Mike Cook (footballer) (born 1968), English former footballer
- Mike Cook (soccer), Canadian soccer player
- Micky Cook (footballer, born 1950), English football forward for Brentford
- Micky Cook (footballer, born 1951), English football right back for Colchester United

== Others ==
- Michael Cook (photographic artist) (born 1968), Australian photographic artist
- Michael Cook (painter) (born 1953), American painter and professor
- Michael Cook (historian) (born 1940), English-Scottish historian and scholar of Islamic history
- Michael Cook (playwright) (1933–1994), Canadian playwright
- Michael Cook (diplomat) (1931–2017), Australian diplomat
- J. Michael Cook, former chairman and CEO of Deloitte & Touche
- Michael Cook (1828–1864), Minnesota politician and Union Army officer

== See also ==
- Michael Cooke (disambiguation)
