= 1970–71 Brentford F.C. season =

English football team season

Brentford
1970–71 season
- Chairman: Walter Wheatley (until January 1971); Eric Radley-Smith (from January 1971)
- Manager: Frank Blunstone
- Stadium: Griffin Park
- Fourth Division: 14th
- FA Cup: Fifth round
- League Cup: First round
- Top goalscorer: League: Ross (15); All: Ross (16)
- Highest home attendance: 10,058
- Lowest home attendance: 4,176
- Average home league attendance: 6,776
Home colours

During the 1970–71 English football season, Brentford competed in the Football League Fourth Division. A forgettable league season was chiefly remembered for a run to the fifth round of the FA Cup, the furthest the Bees had progressed in the competition since 1948–49.

== Season summary ==
After taking over halfway through an encouraging 1969–70 season, Brentford manager Frank Blunstone went into the 1970–71 Fourth Division season with the belief that the club would be able to finish one place higher and gain automatic promotion. Five players were released (including ageing defensive stalwarts Tommy Higginson and Allan Jones) and three were transferred in – midfielder Jackie Graham from Guildford City, utility player Paul Bence from Brighton & Hove Albion and Chelsea youth defender Michael Maskell. Due to financial constraints, Blunstone's squad was limited to just 16 players for the fourth consecutive season, but the youth team was reactivated after being disbanded due to budget cuts in 1967.

A failure to win any of the opening 9 matches of the season in all competitions set a new post-war club record. The loan signing of former Busby Babe Alex Dawson from Brighton & Hove Albion in September 1970 helped improve matters, with the forward scoring 7 goals in 11 appearances and inspiring a five-match winning streak in October and November. Frustratingly, a £7,000 deal to buy him fell through and he left the club after his loan expired. While the team slowly pulled itself away from the relegation zone and finished comfortably in mid-table, the FA Cup gradually became the main focus of the season.

Third Division clubs Gillingham Walsall were beaten in the second round, but the third round draw failed to produce a money-spinning tie and instead an away trip to fellow Fourth Division club Workington. A John Docherty goal was enough to see off Workington and the fourth round draw produced another away tie, this time to Second Division club Cardiff City. Over 23,000 watched Brentford run out 2–0 winners at Ninian Park, courtesy of goals from Jackie Graham and John Docherty. Brentford also faced Second Division opponents in the fifth round, Hull City. Victory would have made Brentford the second Fourth Division club to reach the last-eight of the FA Cup. Brentford took the lead through Bobby Ross at Boothferry Park, but two late goals from the Tigers ended the Bees' run.

Significantly for the long-term future of Brentford, the FA Cup run generated £8,000, which helped boost the profit on the season to £20,000 and enabled the final instalment of the club's 1967 £104,000 loan (equivalent to £1,314,400 in 2025) to be paid off. A 6–4 victory over York City on 9 November 1970 equalled the club record for highest aggregate score in a Football League match.

== League table ==
Pos	Team	Pld	W	D	L	GF	GA	GAv	Pts	Promotion or relegation
12	Darlington	46	17	11	18	58	57	1.018	45	
13	Aldershot	46	14	17	15	66	71	0.930	45	
14	Brentford	46	18	8	20	66	62	1.065	44	
15	Crewe Alexandra	46	18	8	20	75	76	0.987	44	Qualified for the Watney Cup (Note: The two teams who scored the most goals in each division, and did not qualify for Europe and were not promoted, qualified for the Watney Cup.)
16	Peterborough United	46	18	7	21	70	71	0.986	43	

Source: rsssf.com

== Results ==
Brentford's goal tally listed first.

=== Legend ===
Win	Draw	Loss

=== Pre-season and friendlies ===
Date	Opponent	Venue	Result	Attendance	Scorer(s)
1 August 1970	Plymouth Argyle	A	0–2	n/a	
3 August 1970	Yeovil Town	A	2–2	n/a	Docherty, Hawley
8 August 1970	Hillingdon Borough	A	1–1	n/a	Cross
10 August 1970	Bristol Rovers	H	1–1	3,900	Docherty
11 November 1970	West Ham United	H	0–3	5,950	
21 April 1971	Guildford City	A	1–0	n/a	Moore

=== Football League Fourth Division ===
No.	Date	Opponent	Venue	Result	Attendance	Scorer(s)
1	15 August 1970	Chester	H	1–2	6,477	Docherty
2	22 August 1970	Lincoln City	A	0–2	6,813	
3	29 August 1970	Southport	H	0–1	5,324	
4	31 August 1970	Cambridge United	A	0–1	6,654	
5	5 September 1970	Oldham Athletic	A	1–5	4,866	Tawse
6	12 September 1970	Peterborough United	H	1–1	4,176	Ross
7	19 September 1970	Notts County	A	0–0	10,281	
8	23 September 1970	Crewe Alexandra	A	3–5	1,909	Cross, Gater (og), Turner
9	26 September 1970	Darlington	H	1–0	4,841	Docherty
10	28 September 1970	Stockport County	A	0–1	4,387	
11	3 October 1970	Northampton Town	A	0–1	6,282	
12	10 October 1970	Bournemouth & Boscombe Athletic	H	1–2	5,965	Graham
13	17 October 1970	Chester	A	2–1	5,834	Dawson, Cross
14	19 October 1970	Aldershot	H	2–3	7,648	Dawson, Ross
15	24 October 1970	Southend United	A	3–4	6,052	Docherty, Dawson, Ross
16	31 October 1970	Exeter City	H	5–0	5,267	Docherty (2), Cross, Graham, Ross
17	7 November 1970	Newport County	A	1–0	2,407	Dawson
18	9 November 1970	York City	H	6–4	5,955	Dawson, Cross (2), Docherty (3)
19	14 November 1970	Grimsby Town	H	2–0	5,497	Dawson, Ross (pen)
20	28 November 1970	Colchester United	A	0–4	4,673	
21	5 December 1970	Barrow	H	2–1	5,632	Cross, Ross
22	19 December 1970	Lincoln City	H	2–1	5,966	Graham, Bence
23	26 December 1970	Scunthorpe United	A	1–1	4,736	Cross
24	9 January 1971	Stockport County	H	3–0	7,340	Docherty, Ross, Cross
25	16 January 1971	Aldershot	A	0–1	7,533	
26	6 February 1971	Barrow	A	1–0	2,338	Bence
27	20 February 1971	York City	A	0–0	3,366	
28	24 February 1971	Hartlepool	H	1–0	9,246	Graham
29	27 February 1971	Exeter City	A	0–1	3,892	
30	6 March 1971	Southend United	H	4–2	6,348	Cross, Ross (2, 1 pen)
31	8 March 1971	Crewe Alexandra	H	3–1	7,631	Bence, Neilson, Ross
32	13 March 1971	Grimsby Town	A	5–1	3,336	Cross, Bence, Ross (2)
33	15 March 1971	Hartlepool	A	0–0	2,936	
34	20 March 1971	Newport County	H	0–3	8,421	
35	24 March 1971	Workington	A	1–1	1,731	Docherty
36	27 March 1971	Oldham Athletic	H	1–1	7,207	Renwick
37	29 March 1971	Colchester United	H	1–0	9,209	Neilson
38	3 April 1971	Southport	A	0–2	2,026	
39	9 April 1971	Northampton Town	H	3–0	10,058	Ross (2), Turner
40	10 April 1971	Scunthorpe United	H	0–1	7,561	
41	12 April 1971	Peterborough United	A	2–1	3,841	Neilson, Ross
42	17 April 1971	Bournemouth & Boscombe Athletic	A	0–1	11,206	
43	24 April 1971	Notts County	H	2–2	9,229	Cross, Graham
44	26 April 1971	Cambridge United	H	1–2	5,994	O'Mara
45	1 May 1971	Darlington	A	1–2	1,629	Cross
46	7 May 1971	Workington	H	3–0	4,781	Neilson, Graham, O'Mara

=== FA Cup ===
Round	Date	Opponent	Venue	Result	Attendance	Scorer(s)
1R	21 November 1970	Gillingham	H	2–1	8,000	Docherty, Dawson
2R	11 December 1970	Walsall	H	1–0	8,500	Cross
3R	2 January 1971	Workington	A	1–0	5,953	Docherty
4R	23 January 1971	Cardiff City	A	2–0	23,335	Graham, Docherty
5R	13 February 1971	Hull City	A	1–2	29,709	Ross

=== Football League Cup ===
Round	Date	Opponent	Venue	Result	Attendance
1R	18 August 1970	Aldershot	A	0–1	6,899

- Sources: The Big Brentford Book of the Seventies, Statto

== Playing squad ==
Players' ages are as of the opening day of the 1970–71 season.

Pos.	Name	Nat.	Date of birth (age)	Signed from	Signed in	Notes
Goalkeepers
GK	Chic Brodie	(Scotland)	22 February 1937 (aged 33)	Northampton Town	1963	
GK	Gordon Phillips	(England)	17 November 1946 (aged 23)	Hayes	1963	
Defenders
DF	Paul Bence	(England)	21 December 1948 (aged 21)	Reading	1970	
DF	Peter Gelson	(England)	18 October 1941 (aged 28)	Youth	1961	
DF	Alan Hawley	(England)	7 June 1946 (aged 24)	Youth	1962	
DF	Alan Nelmes	(England)	20 October 1948 (aged 21)	Chelsea	1967	
DF	Dick Renwick	(England)	27 November 1942 (aged 27)	Aldershot	1969	
Midfielders
MF	John Docherty	(Scotland)	29 April 1940 (aged 30)	Reading	1970	
MF	Alan Gane	(England)	11 June 1950 (aged 20)	Slough Town	1971	Amateur
MF	Jackie Graham	(Scotland)	16 July 1946 (aged 24)	Guildford City	1970	
MF	Allan Mansley	(England)	31 August 1946 (aged 23)	Blackpool	1968	Loaned to Fulham and Notts County
MF	Gordon Neilson	(Scotland)	28 May 1947 (aged 23)	Arsenal	1968	
MF	Bobby Ross (c)	(Scotland)	10 May 1942 (aged 28)	Shrewsbury Town	1966	
MF	Brian Tawse	(Scotland)	30 July 1945 (aged 25)	Brighton & Hove Albion	1970	Loaned to Folkestone
MF	Brian Turner	(New Zealand)	31 July 1949 (aged 21)	Portsmouth	1970	
Forwards
FW	Roger Cross	(England)	20 October 1948 (aged 21)	West Ham United	1970	
FW	Mick Heath	(England)	9 January 1953 (aged 17)	Walton & Hersham	1971	Amateur
FW	John O'Mara	(England)	19 March 1947 (aged 23)	Wimbledon	1971	
Players who left the club mid-season
DF	Michael Maskell	(England)	25 January 1952 (aged 18)	Chelsea	1970	Released
FW	Alex Dawson	(Scotland)	21 February 1940 (aged 30)	Brighton & Hove Albion	1970	Returned to Brighton & Hove Albion after loan

- Sources: The Big Brentford Book of the Seventies, Timeless Bees

== Coaching staff ==
Name	Role
(England) Frank Blunstone	Manager
(England) Eddie Lyons	Trainer

== Statistics ==
=== Appearances and goals ===
Substitute appearances in brackets.

Pos	Nat	Name	League		FA Cup		League Cup		Total	
Pos	Nat	Name	Apps	Goals	Apps	Goals	Apps	Goals	Apps	Goals
GK	(Scotland)	Chic Brodie	17	0	1	0	1	0	19	0
GK	(England)	Gordon Phillips	29	0	4	0	0	0	33	0
DF	(England)	Paul Bence	44	4	5	0	1	0	50	4
DF	(England)	Peter Gelson	45	0	5	0	1	0	51	0
DF	(England)	Alan Hawley	25 (1)	0	3	0	1	0	29 (1)	0
DF	(England)	Michael Maskell	1	0	—		0	0	1	0
DF	(England)	Alan Nelmes	46	0	5	0	1	0	52	0
DF	(England)	Dick Renwick	40	1	5	0	0	0	45	1
MF	(Scotland)	John Docherty	35 (1)	10	5	3	1	0	41 (1)	13
MF	(Scotland)	Jackie Graham	42	6	5	1	1	0	48	7
MF	(England)	Allan Mansley	7 (2)	0	0	0	0	0	7 (2)	0
MF	(Scotland)	Gordon Neilson	16 (3)	4	2 (1)	0	1	0	19 (4)	4
MF	(Scotland)	Bobby Ross	46	15	5	1	1	0	52	16
MF	(Scotland)	Brian Tawse	7 (2)	1	0	0	1	0	8 (2)	1
MF	(New Zealand)	Brian Turner	40 (2)	2	4	0	1	0	45 (2)	2
FW	(England)	Roger Cross	46	14	5	1	1	0	52	15
FW	(England)	Mick Heath	1	0	—		—		1	0
FW	(England)	John O'Mara	9	2	—		—		9	2
Players loaned in during the season
FW	(Scotland)	Alex Dawson	10	6	1	1	—		11	7

- Players listed in italics left the club mid-season.
- Source: 100 Years of Brentford

=== Goalscorers ===
Pos.	Nat	Player	FL4	FAC	FLC	Total
MF	(Scotland)	Bobby Ross	15	1	0	16
FW	(England)	Roger Cross	14	1	0	15
MF	(Scotland)	John Docherty	10	3	0	13
FW	(Scotland)	Alex Dawson	6	1	—	7
MF	(Scotland)	Jackie Graham	6	1	0	7
DF	(England)	Paul Bence	4	0	0	4
MF	(Scotland)	Gordon Neilson	4	0	0	4
FW	(England)	John O'Mara	2	—	—	2
MF	(New Zealand)	Brian Turner	2	0	0	2
DF	(England)	Dick Renwick	1	0	0	1
MF	(Scotland)	Brian Tawse	1	0	0	1
Opponents			1	0	0	1
Total			66	7	0	73

- Players listed in italics left the club mid-season.
- Source: 100 Years of Brentford

=== Management ===
Name	Nat	From	To	Record All Comps					Record League				
Name	Nat	From	To	P	W	D	L	W %	P	W	D	L	W %
Frank Blunstone	(England)	15 August 1970	7 May 1971	52	22	8	22	42.31	46	18	8	20	39.13

=== Summary ===
Games played	52 (46 Fourth Division, 5 FA Cup, 1 League Cup)
Games won	22 (18 Fourth Division, 4 FA Cup, 0 League Cup)
Games drawn	8 (8 Fourth Division, 0 FA Cup, 0 League Cup)
Games lost	22 (20 Fourth Division, 1 FA Cup, 1 League Cup)
Goals scored	73 (66 Fourth Division, 7 FA Cup, 0 League Cup)
Goals conceded	66 (62 Fourth Division, 3 FA Cup, 1 League Cup)
Clean sheets	16 (13 Fourth Division, 3 FA Cup, 0 League Cup)
Biggest league win	5–0 versus Exeter City, 31 October 1970
Worst league defeat	4–0 versus Colchester United, 28 November 1970; 5–1 versus Oldham Athletic, 5 September 1970
Most appearances	52, Roger Cross, Alan Nelmes, Bobby Ross (46 Fourth Division, 5 FA Cup, 1 League Cup)
Top scorer (league)	15, Bobby Ross
Top scorer (all competitions)	16, Bobby Ross

== Transfers & loans ==
Players transferred in
Date	Pos.	Name	Previous club	Fee	Ref.
July 1970	DF	(England) Paul Bence	(England) Reading	Free	
July 1970	MF	(Scotland) Jackie Graham	(England) Guildford City	£2,500	
July 1970	DF	(England) Michael Maskell	(England) Chelsea	Free	
1970	DF	(England) Richard Poole	n/a	n/a	
1970	DF	(England) Kevin Harding	n/a	n/a	
March 1971	FW	(England) John O'Mara	(England) Wimbledon	£1,000	
April 1971	FW	(England) Mick Heath	(England) Walton & Hersham	Amateur	
Players loaned in
Date from	Pos.	Name	From	Date to	Ref.
September 1970	FW	(Scotland) Alex Dawson	(England) Brighton & Hove Albion	November 1970	
Players loaned out
Date from	Pos.	Name	To	Date to	Ref.
November 1970	MF	(England) Allan Mansley	(England) Fulham	December 1970	
February 1971	MF	(Scotland) Brian Tawse	(England) Folkestone	n/a	
March 1971	MF	(England) Allan Mansley	(England) Notts County	n/a	
Players released
Date	Pos.	Name	Subsequent club	Join date	Ref.
October 1970	DF	(England) Michael Maskell	(England) Stevenage Athletic	1970	
May 1971	GK	(Scotland) Chic Brodie	(England) Margate	July 1971	
May 1971	MF	(England) Allan Mansley	(England) Notts County	May 1971	
May 1971	MF	(Scotland) Brian Tawse	(South Africa) Durban City	1971	
June 1971	DF	(England) Dick Renwick	(England) Stockport County	October 1971	

== Awards ==
- Supporters' Player of the Year: Bobby Ross
- Players' Player of the Year: Alan Nelmes
