= Caterer (surname) =

Caterer is a surname. Notable people with the surname include:

- Ainslie Caterer (1858–1924), Australian cricketer, cricket administrator and educator
- Brian Caterer (1943–2010), English professional footballer and manager
- Josh Caterer (born 1972), American musician and songwriter from Chicago
- Thomas Caterer (1825–1917), Australian pioneer schoolteacher

== See also ==
- Catering, business of providing food service at a remote site
- The Caterer, a hospitality periodical
