= Allan Mansley =

English footballer

Personal information
- Full name: Allan Mansley
- Date of birth: 31 August 1946
- Place of birth: Liverpool, England
- Date of death: 4 February 2001 (aged 54)
- Place of death: Southport, England
- Position: Left winger

Youth career
- Everton
- Sheffield Wednesday
- Crewe Alexandra

Senior career*
Years	Team	Apps	(Gls)
1966–1967	Skelmersdale United		
1967–1968	Blackpool	0	(0)
1968–1971	Brentford	95	(24)
1970	→ Fulham (loan)	1	(0)
1971	→ Notts County (loan)	0	(0)
1971–1972	Notts County	11	(2)
1971–1972	→ Lincoln City (loan)	3	(0)
- * Club domestic league appearances and goals

Allan Mansley (31 August 1946 – 4 February 2001) was an English professional footballer, best remembered for his four years as a left winger in the Football League with Brentford. In a short league career, he also played for Notts County, Lincoln City and Fulham.

== Career ==
=== Early years ===
Mansley began his career as a schoolboy in Liverpool with Everton and later spent time with league clubs Sheffield Wednesday and Crewe Alexandra. He dropped into non-League football in 1966, when he joined Lancashire Combination First Division club Skelmersdale United. He reached the final of the FA Amateur Cup with the team during the 1966–67 season and caught the attention of Football League Second Division club Blackpool, with whom he signed a contract in June 1967. He departed Bloomfield Road in January 1968, after failing to make an appearance for the Tangerines.

=== Brentford ===
Mansley dropped down to the Fourth Division to sign for Brentford in January 1968. He quickly established himself in the team and made 19 appearances during what remained of the 1967–68 season. Flourishing under the management of Jimmy Sirrel, he made what would be a career-high 46 appearances during the 1968–69 season, top-scoring with 17 goals. Mansley held a regular place in the team until the appointment of Frank Blunstone as manager in December 1969, under whom he made just seven appearances in what remained of the 1969–70 season. He began the 1970–71 season as a regular in the team, but fell out of favour in late September 1970 and joined Third Division club Fulham in November 1970 as the club's first-ever loan signing. He made just one appearance for the Cottagers before the loan expired. Mansley was released at the end of the 1970–71 season and made 105 appearances and scored 30 goals during 2 1/2 years at Griffin Park.

=== Notts County ===
Mansley joined Third Division club Notts County on loan in March 1971, a move which reunited him with his former Brentford manager Jimmy Sirrel. He failed to make an appearance, but impressed enough to join the club on a free transfer at the end of the season. Mansley failed to make an impression in his only full season at Meadow Lane, making just 14 appearances and scoring two goals. In search of regular football, Mansley signed on loan with Fourth Division club Lincoln City in December 1971 and made three appearances before departing the following month.

== Personal life ==
Mansley died in February 2001 of a heart attack.

== Career statistics ==
Appearances and goals by club, season and competition
Club	Season	League			FA Cup		League Cup		Total	
Club	Season	Division	Apps	Goals	Apps	Goals	Apps	Goals	Apps	Goals
Brentford	1967–68	Fourth Division	19	4	—		—		19	4
Brentford	1968–69	Fourth Division	41	14	2	0	3	3	46	17
Brentford	1969–70	Fourth Division	26	6	2	0	3	3	31	9
Brentford	1970–71	Fourth Division	9	0	0	0	0	0	9	0
Brentford	Total		95	24	4	0	6	6	105	30
Fulham (loan)	1970–71	Third Division	1	0	—		—		1	0
Notts County	1971–72	Third Division	11	2	0	0	3	0	14	2
Lincoln City (loan)	1971–72	Fourth Division	3	0	—		—		3	0
Career total			110	26	4	4	9	6	123	26
