= Alan Nelmes =

English footballer

Personal information
- Full name: Alan Victor Nelmes
- Date of birth: 20 October 1948 (age 78)
- Place of birth: Hackney, England
- Positions: Defender; wing half

Youth career
- 1965–1967: Chelsea

Senior career*
Years	Team	Apps	(Gls)
1967–1976	Brentford	316	(2)
1976–1977	Hillingdon Borough		
1977–1978	Hayes		
- Southall
- * Club domestic league appearances and goals

Alan Victor Nelmes (born 20 October 1948) is an English retired professional footballer who made over 300 appearances as a defender in the Football League for Brentford. He was inducted into the club's Hall of Fame in November 2014.

== Career ==
=== Chelsea ===
Nelmes was born in Hackney, but moved to South London and attended Ingram High School, near Selhurst Park. Nelmes began his career at First Division club Chelsea and signed his first professional contract in October 1965. He failed to make an appearance for the first team and was released at the end of the 1966–67 season.

=== Brentford ===
Nelmes turned down offers from Aldershot and Colchester United to sign for Fourth Division club Brentford in July 1967. Operating initially as a right back, he went on to be a vital cog in a threadbare Brentford team, missing only three games between 1968 and 1972 and is one of a few Bees players to make 100 consecutive appearances. Manager Jimmy Sirrel assembled a small squad of versatile players and Nelmes was picked to play up front versus Notts County on 2 March 1968, scoring one of his only two goals for the club. He played in five different positions during the 1967–68 season.

Adept anywhere across the back four and as a sweeper, Nelmes' performances garnered him the Brentford Players' Player of the Year award for the 1970–71 season. Known as 'Spider', he helped Brentford achieve promotion to the Third Division in the 1971–72 season, though the club were relegated straight back to the Fourth Division the following year. After a succession of injuries took a toll on his body, Nelmes was released at the end of the 1975–76 season, having made 350 appearances for the club. Despite being what he described as "quite a physical player", Nelmes was never sent off during his career. He was given a testimonial versus former club Chelsea in 1978, which finished 8–2 to the Stamford Bridge club. Nelmes earned a then-club record £7,000 from the match. In recognition of his performances for the club, Nelmes was inducted into the Brentford Hall of Fame in November 2014.

=== Non-League football ===
After his release from Brentford, Nelmes played out his career with spells at Southern League club Hillingdon Borough and Isthmian League clubs Hayes (managed by former Brentford teammate Bobby Ross) and Southall, before retiring due to a cartilage injury.

== Personal life ==
Nelmes is married to Norma and has two sons, Martin and Stuart. Stuart has played cricket for Sussex County League club Middleton since 2005. During the 1970s, Nelmes lived in Isleworth and worked at the Watneys brewery in Mortlake. He spent time running a business in Bognor Regis in the 1970s and in the 1990s and 2000s, he was worked in security at Gatwick Airport. As of 2015, Nelmes was living in Middleton-on-Sea.

== Career statistics ==
Appearances and goals by club, season and competition
Club	Season	League			FA Cup		League Cup		Total	
Club	Season	Division	Apps	Goals	Apps	Goals	Apps	Goals	Apps	Goals
Brentford	1967–68	Fourth Division	24	1	2	0	1	0	27	1
Brentford	1968–69	Fourth Division	44	1	2	0	3	0	49	1
Brentford	1969–70	Fourth Division	45	0	2	0	3	0	50	0
Brentford	1970–71	Fourth Division	46	0	5	0	1	0	52	0
Brentford	1971–72	Fourth Division	46	0	2	0	1	0	49	0
Brentford	1972–73	Third Division	36	0	1	0	2	0	39	0
Brentford	1973–74	Fourth Division	33	0	1	0	1	0	35	0
Brentford	1974–75	Fourth Division	13	0	0	0	0	0	13	0
Brentford	1975–76	Fourth Division	29	0	4	0	3	0	36	0
Career total			316	2	19	0	15	0	350	2

== Honours ==
Brentford

- Football League Fourth Division third-place promotion: 1971–72

Individual

- Brentford Players' Player of the Year: 1970–71
- Brentford Hall of Fame
