= Ron Willis (footballer) =

English footballer

Personal information
- Full name: Ronald Ian Willis
- Date of birth: 27 December 1947 (age 78)
- Place of birth: Romford, England
- Position: Goalkeeper

Youth career
- 1965–1966: Coventry City

Senior career*
Years	Team	Apps	(Gls)
1966–1968	Orient	45	(0)
1967–1969	Charlton Athletic	1	(0)
1968–1969	→ Brentford (loan)	1	(0)
1969–1970	Colchester United	6	(0)
1974–1975	Arcadia Shepherds	?	(?)
1975–1976	Shamrocks	?	(?)
Total		53	(0)

International career
- England Youth
- * Club domestic league appearances and goals

Ronald Ian Willis (born 27 December 1947 in Romford, England) is an English retired professional footballer who played as a goalkeeper in the Football League, most notably for Orient.

== Career statistics ==
Appearances and goals by club, season and competition
Club	Season	League			FA Cup		League Cup		Total	
Club	Season	Division	Apps	Goals	Apps	Goals	Apps	Goals	Apps	Goals
Brentford	1968–69	Fourth Division	1	0	—		0	0	1	0
Colchester United	1968–69	Fourth Division	3	0	0	0	0	0	3	0
Colchester United	1969–70	Fourth Division	3	0	0	0	1	0	4	0
Colchester United	Total		6	0	0	0	1	0	7	0
Career total			7	0	0	0	1	0	8	0
