= Michael Cooke =

Michael Cooke may refer to:

- Michael Cooke (footballer) (born 1953), Australian rules footballer
- Michael Cooke (journalist) (born 1953), Canadian journalist and publishing executive
- Michael George Cooke, American academic.
- Mick Cooke (musician) (born 1973), Scottish musician with Belle & Sebastian
- Mick Cooke (Australian footballer) (1938–2014), Australian rules footballer
- Mick Cooke (football manager) (born 1951), Irish association football manager and player

== See also ==
- Michael Cook (disambiguation)
