= Alan Cocks =

English footballer

Personal information
- Full name: Alan William Cocks
- Date of birth: 7 May 1951 (age 75)
- Place of birth: Burscough, England
- Position: Forward

Youth career
- 1966–1967: Burscough
- 1967–1969: Chelsea

Senior career*
Years	Team	Apps	(Gls)
1969–1970	Chelsea	0	(0)
1970	→ Brentford (loan)	11	(2)
1970–1971	Southport	24	(7)
1971–1973	Great Harwood		
1973–1974	Skelmersdale United		
1974–1976	Runcorn		
- Lathom & Burscough British Legion
- * Club domestic league appearances and goals

Alan William Cocks (born 7 May 1951) is an English retired professional footballer who played as a forward in the Football League for Southport and Brentford.

== Personal life ==
Cocks attended Ormskirk Grammar School.

== Career statistics ==
Appearances and goals by club, season and competition
Club	Season	League			FA Cup		League Cup		Total	
Club	Season	Division	Apps	Goals	Apps	Goals	Apps	Goals	Apps	Goals
Brentford (loan)	1969–70	Fourth Division	11	2	—		—		11	2
Southport	1970–71	Fourth Division	24	7	0	0	0	0	24	7
Career total			35	9	0	0	0	0	35	9
