= Roger Frude =

English footballer

Personal information
- Full name: Roger Gordon Frude
- Date of birth: 19 November 1946
- Place of birth: Plymouth, England
- Date of death: 14 June 1996 (aged 49)
- Place of death: Plymouth, England
- Height: 5 ft 10 in (1.78 m)
- Position: Inside forward

Senior career*
| Years | Team | Apps | (Gls) |
| 1963–1967 | Bristol Rovers | 41 | (8) |
| 1967–1969 | Mansfield Town | 15 | (0) |
| 1969 | Brentford | 2 | (0) |
| 1969 | Falmouth Town | | |
| 1969 | Tavistock | | |

International career
| 1964 | England Youth | | |
- * Club domestic league appearances and goals

Roger Gordon Frude (19 November 1946 – 14 June 1996) was an English professional footballer who played as an inside forward in the Football League for Bristol Rovers, Mansfield Town and Brentford.

== Personal life ==
When he died in 1996, Frude's ashes were scattered at Eastville Stadium.

== Career statistics ==
Appearances and goals by club, season and competition
| Club | Season | League | | | National cup (Note: Includes FA Cup) | | League cup (Note: Includes Football League Cup) | | Total | |
| Club | Season | Division | Apps | Goals | Apps | Goals | Apps | Goals | Apps | Goals |
|---|---|---|---|---|---|---|---|---|---|---|
| Bristol Rovers | 1963–64 | Third Division | 3 | 0 | 0 | 0 | 0 | 0 | 3 | 0 |
| Bristol Rovers | 1964–65 | Third Division | 6 | 0 | 0 | 0 | 0 | 0 | 6 | 0 |
| Bristol Rovers | 1965–66 | Third Division | 15 | 5 | 0 | 0 | 0 | 0 | 15 | 5 |
| Bristol Rovers | 1966–67 | Third Division | 15 | 3 | 0 | 0 | 0 | 0 | 15 | 3 |
| Bristol Rovers | 1967–68 | Third Division | 2 | 0 | ― | | 1 | 0 | 3 | 0 |
| Bristol Rovers | Total | | 41 | 8 | 0 | 0 | 1 | 0 | 42 | 8 |
| Brentford | 1969–70 | Fourth Division | 2 | 0 | 0 | 0 | 2 | 0 | 4 | 0 |
| Career total | | | 43 | 8 | 0 | 0 | 3 | 0 | 46 | 8 |
