= Dick Renwick =

English footballer

Personal information
- Full name: Richard Renwick
- Date of birth: 27 November 1942 (age 83)
- Place of birth: Gilsland, England
- Position: Full back

Senior career*
Years	Team	Apps	(Gls)
1962–1963	Grimsby Town	0	(0)
1963–1969	Aldershot	205	(4)
1969–1971	Brentford	96	(5)
1971–1972	Stockport County	30	(1)
1972–1974	Rochdale	49	(0)
1974	→ Darlington (loan)	19	(0)
- * Club domestic league appearances and goals

Richard Renwick (born 27 November 1942) was an English professional footballer who made over 390 appearances as a full back in the Football League, most notably for Aldershot and Brentford.

== Playing career ==
=== Grimsby Town ===
Renwick began his career at Second Division strugglers Grimsby Town in 1962 and departed the club the following year, without making an appearance.

=== Aldershot ===
In July 1963, Renwick dropped down to the Fourth Division to sign for Aldershot. He was a near ever-present for his first five seasons at the club. After making just seven appearances during the 1968–69 season, he departed the Shots in February 1969. During his five and a half years at the Recreation Ground, Renwick made 231 appearances and scored four goals.

=== Brentford ===
Renwick joined Fourth Division club Brentford for a £1,500 fee in February 1969. He made 106 appearances in just over two seasons and departed Griffin Park after rejecting a new contract at the end of the 1970–71 season. A hard player, teammate Jackie Graham later revealed Renwick "used to count how many stitches he'd put into people!".

=== Stockport County ===
Renwick joined Fourth Division strugglers Stockport County in October 1971. He made 32 appearances and scored one goal during his single season at Edgeley Park, in which County finished second-from-bottom and won re-election to the Football League.

=== Rochdale ===
Renwick moved up to the Third Division to sign for Rochdale in July 1972. He made 41 appearances during the 1972–73 season, but fell out of favour in the following campaign and left the club at the end of the 1973–74 season.

==== Darlington (loan) ====
Renwick returned to his native northeast to sign for Fourth Division club Darlington on loan in January 1974 and made 19 league appearances for the club.

== Personal life ==
In the 2000s, Renwick was living in the Burnley area.

== Career statistics ==
Appearances and goals by club, season and competition
Club	Season	League			FA Cup		League Cup		Total	
Club	Season	Division	Apps	Goals	Apps	Goals	Apps	Goals	Apps	Goals
Brentford	1968–69	Fourth Division	17	0	—		—		17	0
Brentford	1969–70	Fourth Division	39	4	2	0	3	0	44	4
Brentford	1970–71	Fourth Division	40	1	5	0	0	0	45	1
Brentford	Total		96	5	7	0	3	0	106	5
Stockport County	1971–72	Fourth Division	30	1	2	0	0	0	32	1
Darlington (loan)	1973–74	Fourth Division	19	0	—		—		19	0
Career total			145	6	9	0	3	0	157	6
