= Bill Brown (footballer, born 1943) =

English footballer

Personal information
- Full name: William Frederick Thomas Brown
- Date of birth: 7 February 1943 (age 83)
- Place of birth: Croydon, England
- Position: Forward

Senior career*
Years	Team	Apps	(Gls)
1960–1961	Southampton	0	(0)
1961–1962	Charlton Athletic	0	(0)
1962–1964	Romford	80	(29)
1964–1965	Chelmsford City		
1965–1966	Bedford Town	35	(13)
1966–1968	Gillingham	105	(33)
1968–1969	Portsmouth	8	(2)
1969	Brentford	4	(0)
1969–1970	Margate		
1970	Bedford Town	8	(1)
- Dunstable Town
- Ford United
- * Club domestic league appearances and goals

William Frederick Thomas Brown (born 7 February 1943) is an English former professional footballer who played as a forward. His professional clubs included Portsmouth, Brentford and Gillingham, for whom he made over 100 Football League appearances. Either side of his spell in the Football League, Brown had a long career in non-League football.

== Personal life ==
As of October 1969, Brown was running his own haulage business. As of 2014, he was living in Essex.

== Career statistics ==
Appearances and goals by club, season and competition
Club	Season	League			FA Cup		League Cup		Other		Total	
Club	Season	Division	Apps	Goals	Apps	Goals	Apps	Goals	Apps	Goals	Apps	Goals
Bedford Town	1965–66	Southern League Premier Division	35	13	6	1	—		11 (Note: 6 appearances and 3 goals in Eastern Professional Floodlit Competition, 4 appearances in Southern League Cup, 1 appearance in Huntingdonshire Premier Cup)	3	42	17
Gillingham	1965–66	Third Division	24	10	—		—		—		24	10
Gillingham	1966–67	Third Division	41	9	2	0	5	1	—		48	10
Gillingham	1967–68	Third Division	40	14	1	0	3	0	—		44	14
Gillingham	Total		105	33	3	0	8	1	—		116	34
Portsmouth	1968–69	Second Division	8	2	0	0	1	0	—		9	2
Brentford	1969–70	Fourth Division	4	0	0	0	0	0	—		4	0
Bedford Town	1969–70	Southern League First Division	8	1	—		—		5 (Note: 3 appearances in Eastern Professional Floodlit Competition, 2 appearances in Southern League Cup)	0	13	1
Bedford Town	Total		43	14	6	1	—		16	3	55	18
Career total			160	49	9	1	9	0	16	3	194	53
