= David Harney =

English footballer (1947–2019)

Personal information
- Full name: David Harney
- Date of birth: 2 March 1947
- Place of birth: Jarrow, England
- Date of death: April 2019 (aged 72)
- Place of death: Bromley, England
- Height: 5 ft 9 in (1.75 m)
- Position: Forward

Youth career
- Cleadon Juniors
- Sunderland
- 1962–1964: Grimsby Town

Senior career*
Years	Team	Apps	(Gls)
1964–1967	Grimsby Town	60	(10)
1967–1969	Scunthorpe United	52	(8)
1969	Brentford	1	(0)
1973–1976	Wimbledon	40	(9)
- Bromley
- * Club domestic league appearances and goals

David Harney (2 March 1947 – April 2019) was an English professional footballer who played in the Football League for Grimsby Town, Scunthorpe United and Brentford as a forward.

== Career ==
A forward, Harney began his career with Grimsby Town and moved to Third Division club Scunthorpe United in July 1967. Injuries plagued his career at the Old Showground and he joined Fourth Division club Brentford on trial in October 1969, but was not offered a contract and made just one appearance. Harney finished his career in non-League football with Wimbledon and Bromley.

== Career statistics ==
Appearances and goals by club, season and competition
Club	Season	League			FA Cup		League Cup		Total	
Club	Season	Division	Apps	Goals	Apps	Goals	Apps	Goals	Apps	Goals
Brentford	1969–70	Fourth Division	1	0	0	0	0	0	1	0
Career total			1	0	0	0	0	0	1	0
