= Brian Tawse =

Scottish footballer

Personal information
- Full name: Brian Tawse
- Date of birth: 30 July 1945 (age 81)
- Place of birth: Ellon, Scotland
- Position: Winger

Youth career
- 1963–1964: Arsenal

Senior career*
Years	Team	Apps	(Gls)
1964–1965	Arsenal	5	(0)
1965–1970	Brighton & Hove Albion	102	(14)
1970–1971	Brentford	22	(1)
1971	→ Folkestone (loan)		
- Durban City
Total		129	(15)
- * Club domestic league appearances and goals

Brian Tawse (born 30 July 1945) is a Scottish former professional footballer who made over 100 appearances in the Football League for Brighton & Hove Albion as a winger.

== Career ==
Born in Ellon, Tawse played in the Football League for Arsenal, Brighton & Hove Albion and Brentford and made a total of 129 appearances between 1964 and 1971. He later played in South Africa for Durban City.

== Personal life ==
Tawse lived in South Africa for 17 years and as of January 2018, he was living in Westdene.

== Career statistics ==
Appearances and goals by club, season and competition
Club	Season	League			FA Cup		League Cup		Total	
Club	Season	Division	Apps	Goals	Apps	Goals	Apps	Goals	Apps	Goals
Arsenal	1964–65	First Division	5	0	0	0	0	0	5	0
Brentford	1969–70	Fourth Division	13	0	—		—		13	0
Brentford	1970–71	Fourth Division	9	1	0	0	1	0	10	1
Brentford	Total		22	1	0	0	1	0	23	1
Career total			27	1	0	0	1	0	28	1
