= Michael Maskell (footballer) =

English footballer

Personal information
- Full name: Michael Richard Maskell
- Date of birth: 25 January 1952
- Place of birth: Eynsham, England
- Date of death: 4 May 2017 (aged 65)
- Place of death: Hertfordshire, England
- Position: Full back

Youth career
- Chelsea

Senior career*
Years	Team	Apps	(Gls)
1969–1970	Chelsea	0	(0)
1970	Brentford	1	(0)
- Stevenage Athletic
- * Club domestic league appearances and goals

Michael Richard Maskell (25 January 1952 – 4 May 2017) was an English footballer who made one appearance as a full back in the Football League for Brentford.

== Playing career ==
=== Chelsea ===
A full back, Maskell began his career in the youth system at First Division club Chelsea. He was a part of the first team squad during the 1969–70 season, but failed to make an appearance. He was released at the end of the season.

=== Brentford ===
Maskell's former Chelsea youth team manager Frank Blunstone brought him to Fourth Division club Brentford in July 1970. Maskell made his professional debut in a 5–1 defeat to Oldham Athletic on 5 September 1970. It was his only appearance for the club and his contract was cancelled shortly afterwards, due to an alleged serious breach of discipline.

=== Stevenage Athletic ===
After his release from Brentford, Maskell dropped into non-League football and signed for Southern League First Division club Stevenage Athletic.

== Personal life ==
Maskell's brother John was also a footballer.

== Career statistics ==
Appearances and goals by club, season and competition
Club	Season	League			FA Cup		League Cup		Total	
Club	Season	Division	Apps	Goals	Apps	Goals	Apps	Goals	Apps	Goals
Brentford	1970–71	Fourth Division	1	0	0	0	—		1	0
Career total			1	0	0	0	0	0	1	0
