= George Dobson (footballer, born 1949) =

English footballer and coach

Personal information
- Full name: George Richard Dobson
- Date of birth: 24 August 1949
- Place of birth: Chiswick, England
- Date of death: 10 September 2007 (aged 58)
- Place of death: Barton on Sea, England
- Position: Winger

Senior career*
Years	Team	Apps	(Gls)
1966–1970	Brentford	86	(10)
1971–1972	Guildford City		
1975	Slough Town	14	(1)
- * Club domestic league appearances and goals

George Richard Dobson (24 August 1949 – 10 September 2007) was an English footballer who played in the Football League for Brentford as a winger. He later dropped into non-League football and played for Guildford City and Slough Town. After retiring as a player, he became a coach.

== Playing career ==
=== Brentford ===
A winger, Dobson joined Brentford at a young age and came through the youth ranks and made his debut in a 1–0 Fourth Division win over Chesterfield at Griffin Park on 25 February 1967 at the age of just 17. He quickly established himself as a first team regular, making 37 appearances during the 1967–68 season and winning rave reviews for his ability to take on and beat opposition full backs. Dobson's appearance count reduced during the 1968–69 season, as a broken ankle hindered his progress. An injury to Dobson's other leg ensured he would not be the same player again and he departed the Bees at the end of the 1969–70 season. He made 93 appearances and scored 10 goals for the club.

=== Non-League football ===
After his release from Brentford, Dobson had spells with non-League clubs Guildford City and Slough Town in the 1970s.

== Coaching career ==
Dobson later returned to Brentford to work in the club's Centre Of Excellence.

== Personal life ==
Dobson had two sons, Michael and Richard, who were both on the books at Brentford, with Michael making over 200 appearances for the first team between 2000 and 2006, many of them as captain. Richard played non-League football and went on to work in the Centre Of Excellence at Brentford and coached the club's women's team, before moving to Wycombe Wanderers in 2007 to work in the club's youth system, rising to become first team assistant manager in 2011. Dobson, a cancer sufferer, died on 10 September 2007.

== Career statistics ==
Appearances and goals by club, season and competition
Club	Season	League			FA Cup		League Cup		Other		Total	
Club	Season	Division	Apps	Goals	Apps	Goals	Apps	Goals	Apps	Goals	Apps	Goals
Brentford	1966–67	Fourth Division	2	0	0	0	0	0	—		2	0
Brentford	1967–68	Fourth Division	36	3	0	0	1	0	—		37	3
Brentford	1968–69	Fourth Division	28	3	0	0	3	0	—		31	3
Brentford	1969–70	Fourth Division	20	4	1	0	2	0	—		23	4
Brentford	Total		86	10	1	0	6	0	—		93	10
Slough Town	1975–76	Isthmian League First Division	14	1	0	0	—		1 (Note: Appearance in FA Trophy)	0	15	1
Career total			100	11	1	0	6	0	1	0	108	11
