= Peter Deakin (footballer) =

English footballer

Personal information
- Full name: Peter Deakin
- Date of birth: 25 March 1938 (age 88)
- Place of birth: Normanton, England
- Position: Inside forward

Youth career
- 1956–1957: Bolton Wanderers

Senior career*
Years	Team	Apps	(Gls)
1957–1964	Bolton Wanderers	63	(13)
1964–1966	Peterborough United	78	(34)
1966–1967	Bradford Park Avenue	36	(9)
1967–1968	Peterborough United	16	(1)
1968	Brentford	8	(2)
1968–1969	Nuneaton Borough	6	(3)
Total		207	(62)
- * Club domestic league appearances and goals

Peter Deakin (born 25 March 1938) is an English retired professional footballer who played as an inside forward in the Football League, most notably for Peterborough United and Bolton Wanderers. He later returned to Peterborough United as youth team manager and is a member of the club's Hall of Fame.

== Career statistics ==
Appearances and goals by club, season and competition
Club	Season	League			FA Cup		League Cup		Other		Total	
Club	Season	Division	Apps	Goals	Apps	Goals	Apps	Goals	Apps	Goals	Apps	Goals
Bolton Wanderers	1957–58	First Division	2	0	0	0	—		—		2	0
Bolton Wanderers	1958–59	First Division	1	0	0	0	—		—		1	0
Bolton Wanderers	1959–60	First Division	8	2	0	0	—		—		8	2
Bolton Wanderers	1960–61	First Division	12	2	0	0	0	0	—		12	2
Bolton Wanderers	1961–62	First Division	3	0	0	0	0	0	—		3	0
Bolton Wanderers	1962–63	First Division	19	7	0	0	0	0	—		19	7
Bolton Wanderers	1963–64	First Division	18	3	0	0	0	0	—		18	3
Bolton Wanderers	Total		63	14	0	0	0	0	—		63	14
Peterborough United	1964–65	Third Division	35	18	8	6	2	0	—		45	24
Peterborough United	1965–66	Third Division	37	16	2	3	4	2	—		43	21
Peterborough United	1966–67	Third Division	6	0	—		1	0	—		8	0
Peterborough United	Total		78	34	10	9	7	2	—		96	45
Peterborough United	1967–68	Third Division	16	1	1	1	—		—		17	2
Peterborough United	Total		94	35	11	10	7	2	—		113	47
Brentford	1968–69	Fourth Division	8	2	—		2	1	—		10	3
Nuneaton Borough	1968–69	Southern League Premier Division	6	3	1	0	—		7 (Note: 2 appearances in Anglia Floodlit Trophy, 2 appearances in Midland Floodlit Cup, 1 appearance and 1 goal in Southern League Cup, 1 appearance and 1 goal in Camkin Cup, 1 appearance in Birmingham Senior Cup)	2	14	5
Career total			171	54	12	10	9	3	7	2	199	69

== Honours ==
- Peterborough United Hall of Fame
