= Pat Terry =

English footballer

Personal information
- Full name: Patrick Alfred Terry
- Date of birth: 2 October 1933
- Place of birth: Lambeth, England
- Date of death: 23 February 2007 (aged 73)
- Place of death: Bromley, England
- Position: Centre forward

Youth career
- 1953–1954: Eastbourne United

Senior career*
Years	Team	Apps	(Gls)
1954–1956	Charlton Athletic	4	(1)
1956–1958	Newport County	55	(30)
1958	Swansea City	17	(9)
1958–1961	Gillingham	108	(60)
1961–1962	Northampton Town	24	(10)
1962–1964	Millwall	97	(41)
1964–1967	Reading	99	(42)
1967–1968	Swindon Town	60	(23)
1968–1969	Brentford	29	(12)
1969–1970	Hillingdon Borough		
- Wimbledon
1970	Folkestone Town		
1972	Stevenage Athletic	9	(0)
- Greenwich Borough
- * Club domestic league appearances and goals

Patrick Alfred Terry (2 October 1933 – 23 February 2007) was an English professional footballer who made nearly 500 appearances as centre forward for 9 Football League clubs, most notably Gillingham, Reading and Millwall. He was described as a player whose "game was built on the understanding that no quarter was asked or given, as he let nothing stand in his way in pursuit of a goal".

== Career statistics ==
Appearances and goals by club, season and competition
Club	Season	League			National cup (Note: Includes FA Cup)		League cup (Note: Includes Football League Cup, Southern League Cup)		Total	
Club	Season	Division	Apps	Goals	Apps	Goals	Apps	Goals	Apps	Goals
Gillingham	1958–59	Fourth Division	31	21	2	1	—		33	22
Gillingham	1959–60	Fourth Division	36	19	4	3	—		30	22
Gillingham	1960–61	Fourth Division	41	20	3	2	2	0	46	22
Gillingham	Total		108	60	9	6	2	0	119	66
Millwall	1961–62	Fourth Division	17	13	—		—		17	13
Millwall	1962–63	Third Division	45	18	3	1	1	0	49	19
Millwall	1963–64	Third Division	35	10	2	1	5	2	42	13
Millwall	Total		97	41	5	2	6	2	108	45
Swindon Town	1966–67	Third Division	18	7	—		—		18	7
Swindon Town	1967–68	Third Division	43	16	4	3	2	0	49	19
Swindon Town	Total		61	23	4	3	2	0	67	26
Brentford	1968–69	Fourth Division	29	12	0	0	2	1	31	13
Stevenage Athletic	1972–73	Southern League First Division North	9	0	1	0	2	0	12	0
Career total			304	136	19	11	14	3	337	150

== Honours ==
Millwall

- Football League Fourth Division: 1961–62
