= Denis Hunt =

English footballer (1937–2019)

Personal information
- Full name: Denis Perrior Hunt
- Date of birth: 8 September 1937
- Place of birth: Portsmouth, England
- Date of death: 31 January 2019 (aged 81)
- Place of death: Seabrook, England
- Height: 5 ft 11 in (1.80 m)
- Positions: Left back; utility player

Senior career*
Years	Team	Apps	(Gls)
1958–1968	Gillingham	322	(6)
1968–1969	Brentford	12	(0)
1969–1973	Folkestone		

Managerial career
- 1969–1973: Folkestone (player-manager)
- 1974–1977: Ashford Town
- 1977–1978: Margate
- * Club domestic league appearances and goals

Denis Perrior Hunt (8 September 1937 – 31 January 2019) was an English professional footballer who made over 320 appearances as a left back in the Football League for Gillingham between 1958 and 1968. He became player-manager of Folkestone in 1969 and later managed Ashford Town and Margate.

== Personal life ==
Hunt grew up in a football family and was the brother of Ralph Hunt and the nephew of Douglas Hunt. Prior to becoming a professional footballer, Hunt served in the British Army and after leaving football, he ran a newsagent's in Folkestone.

== Career statistics ==
Appearances and goals by club, season and competition
Club	Season	League			FA Cup		League Cup		Total	
Club	Season	Division	Apps	Goals	Apps	Goals	Apps	Goals	Apps	Goals
Gillingham	1958–59	Fourth Division	25	0	2	0	—		27	0
Gillingham	1959–60	Fourth Division	42	0	3	0	—		45	0
Gillingham	1960–61	Fourth Division	45	1	3	0	2	0	50	1
Gillingham	1961–62	Fourth Division	44	1	1	0	1	0	46	1
Gillingham	1962–63	Fourth Division	27	0	1	0	0	0	28	0
Gillingham	1963–64	Fourth Division	43	3	1	0	5	0	49	3
Gillingham	1964–65	Third Division	16	0	3	0	1	0	20	0
Gillingham	1965–66	Third Division	6	0	0	0	0	0	6	0
Gillingham	1966–67	Third Division	39	0	2	0	5	0	46	0
Gillingham	1967–68	Third Division	35	1	1	0	3	0	39	1
Gillingham	Total		322	6	17	0	17	0	356	6
Brentford	1968–69	Fourth Division	12	0	0	0	2	0	14	0
Career total			334	6	17	0	19	0	370	6

== Managerial statistics ==
Managerial record by team and tenure
Team	From	To	Record					Ref
Team	From	To	G	W	D	L	Win %	Ref
Margate	May 1977	November 1978	68	34	17	17	50.00	
Total			68	34	17	17	50.00	―

== Honours ==
=== As a player ===
Gillingham

- Football League Fourth Division: 1963–64

=== As a manager ===
Margate

- Southern League First Division South: 1977–78
- Southern League Merit Cup: 1977–78
