= George Kirby (footballer) =

English footballer and manager

Personal information
- Date of birth: 20 December 1933
- Place of birth: Liverpool, England
- Date of death: 24 March 2000 (aged 66)
- Place of death: Elland, England
- Height: 6 ft 0 in (1.83 m)
- Position: Centre forward

Senior career*
Years	Team	Apps	(Gls)
1952–1959	Everton	26	(9)
1959–1960	Sheffield Wednesday	3	(0)
1960–1962	Plymouth Argyle	93	(38)
1962–1964	Southampton	63	(28)
1964	Coventry City	18	(10)
1964–1965	Swansea Town	26	(8)
1965–1967	Walsall	75	(25)
1967–1968	New York Generals	47	(23)
1968–1969	Brentford	5	(1)
1969	Worcester City		

Managerial career
- 1970–1971: Halifax Town
- 1971–1973: Watford
- 1974–1975: ÍA
- –: in Kuwait
- 1977–1978: ÍA
- 1978–1981: Halifax Town
- 1980: ÍA
- 1982: ÍA
- 1986–1987: Al-Fateh
- 1990: ÍA
- * Club domestic league appearances and goals

George Kirby (20 December 1933 – 24 March 2000) was an English footballer and manager.

== Playing career ==
Kirby was born in Liverpool. He was a centre forward who played for Everton, Sheffield Wednesday, Plymouth Argyle, Southampton, Walsall, Swansea City, Coventry City, New York Generals and Brentford. His career lasted from 1952 to 1969 during which he made 309 Football League appearances and scored 119 goals.

== Management career ==
His first post in management was at Halifax Town, initially as coach to Alan Ball Senior and then, in 1970, as first team manager. He spent only one full season in charge, leading the club to their most successful campaign, just missing out on promotion to the old Second Division. He started the 1971–72 season by leading Halifax to a 2–1 Watney Cup victory over a full-strength Manchester United side, which included George Best, Denis Law and Bobby Charlton. Just a week later, Kirby left Halifax to take charge at Watford, where he remained until May 1973. At Watford, injuries, boardroom unrest, and a shortage of luck and money conspired to produce two terrible winters consisting of one humiliation and very nearly a second.

He later moved to Iceland, where he managed one of the country's leading clubs; Íþróttabandalag Akraness (ÍA)

In 1978, he left Akranes and returned to Halifax. Kirby inspired the team to another famous victory over Mancunian rivals; this time, it was the turn of Malcolm Allison's Manchester City, who fell to a single Paul Hendrie goal in an FA Cup 3rd round tie in January 1980. His second spell with the Yorkshire club ended in June 1981 after a string of poor results saw his team finish second bottom of the old 4th division.
