= Ron Fenton =

English footballer (1940–2013)

Personal information
- Full name: Ronald Fenton
- Date of birth: 21 September 1940
- Place of birth: South Shields, England
- Date of death: 25 September 2013 (aged 73)
- Place of death: Beeston, England
- Height: 5 ft 9 in (1.75 m)
- Position: Inside forward

Youth career
- South Shields
- 1956–1957: Burnley

Senior career*
Years	Team	Apps	(Gls)
1957–1962	Burnley	11	(1)
1962–1965	West Bromwich Albion	59	(16)
1965–1968	Birmingham City	33	(7)
1968–1970	Brentford	91	(19)
1970–1971	Notts County	0	(0)
Total		194	(43)

Managerial career
- 1969: Brentford (caretaker)
- 1975–1977: Notts County
- 1995–1997: Floriana
- * Club domestic league appearances and goals

Ronald Fenton (21 September 1940 – 25 September 2013) was an English football player, coach and manager. He played as an inside forward and made nearly 200 appearances in the Football League.

Fenton was born in South Shields where he attended South Shields Grammar-Technical School for Boys. He began his football career with his home town club before joining Burnley as a junior. He moved to West Bromwich Albion in 1962, later playing for Birmingham City and finally Brentford, for whom he acted as caretaker manager after the sudden departure of Jimmy Sirrel to Notts County.

After finishing his playing career, he followed Jimmy Sirrel to join the coaching staff at Notts County. After Sirrel moved to Sheffield United, he became County manager for two years before being replaced by Sirrel again.

After leaving County, Fenton joined Nottingham Forest where he spent ten years on the coaching staff and a further six as assistant manager under Brian Clough.
