= Mick Heath =

English footballer

Personal information
- Full name: Michael Heath
- Date of birth: 9 January 1953 (age 73)
- Place of birth: Hillingdon, England
- Position: Forward

Senior career*
| Years | Team | Apps | (Gls) |
| 1970–1971 | Walton & Hersham | | |
| 1971 | Brentford | 1 | (0) |
- Southall
| 1974–1975 | Wimbledon | 4 | (0) |
- * Club domestic league appearances and goals

Michael Heath (born 9 January 1953) is an English former semi-professional footballer who played in the Football League as a forward for Brentford.

== Career statistics ==
| Club | Season | League | | | FA Cup | | League Cup | | Total | |
| Club | Season | Division | Apps | Goals | Apps | Goals | Apps | Goals | Apps | Goals |
|---|---|---|---|---|---|---|---|---|---|---|
| Brentford | 1970–71 | Fourth Division | 1 | 0 | — | | — | | 1 | 0 |
| Career total | | | 1 | 0 | 0 | 0 | 0 | 0 | 1 | 0 |
