= Michael Cook (painter) =

American painter and professor

- Born: Michael David Cook; 1953 (age 72–73); Aguadilla, Puerto Rico
- Website: michaelcookart.com

Michael David Cook (born 1953) is an American painter and professor. He is an emeritus professor of painting and drawing at the University of New Mexico.

== Early life and education ==
Cook was born in 1953 in Aguadilla, Puerto Rico. He completed his high school at Central High School in Bushey, Hertfordshire, England, in 1971. In 1975, he completed his Bachelor's in Fine Arts at Florida State University. A year later, he received his M.A. from the University of Dallas and subsequently went to the University of Oklahoma, receiving his M.F.A. in 1978. His father Richard Monroe Cook served in WW2 in the Army Air Corp, where he met his Mother Doris Eleanor Atkins and they were married in London in 1943.

== Career ==
After completing his graduation in 1978, Cook moved to Illinois, where he joined the School of Art and Design of the University of Illinois, Urbana-Champaign as a visiting artist, where he started working on his nuclear and thermonuclear paintings. He has worked as a Visiting Assistant Professor at the Department of Art and Design at the University of Illinois, Chicago, Visiting Artist at the University of California, Berkeley, and special guest faculty at the San Francisco Art Institute before joining the University of New Mexico as an Assistant Professor and as an Associate Professor and Associate Dean for Technology. Cook developed "Nature and Technology," an intensive field study class as part of the D.H. Lawrence Ranch Workshops, whose structure has been adopted in several department classes.

Cook's work has been exhibited in various venues, including The New Museum, New York, The Museum of Contemporary Art, Chicago, Art Institute of Chicago, Albuquerque Museum, Boulder Museum of Contemporary Art, Museum of Fine Arts in Santa Fe, Ukrainian Institute of Modern Art, Chicago, University Art Museum, University of Arizona, Tucson, Museum of Fine Arts, The Museum School Gallery, Boston, Massachusetts, as well as commercial galleries. Exhibitions have received critical attention in The New York Times, Art News, The New Art Examiner, The San Francisco Chronicle, and The Magazine, among others. His work is in several public and private collections.

== Selected exhibitions ==
=== Solo exhibitions ===
- 1982: Michael Cook, Paintings and Drawings, N.A.M.E. Gallery, Chicago, Illinois, March 1982.
- 1983: Michael Cook: Paintings and Drawings, The Grayson Gallery, Chicago, Illinois; March 25 - April 26, 1983.
- 1984: Michael Cook: Paintings and Drawings, The Wenger Gallery, San Diego, California, February 24 - April 2, 1984.
- 1986: Michael Cook: Suite 71645, Painting and Drawing, Janet Steinberg Gallery, San Francisco, California, April 30 - May 31, 1986.
- 1989: Michael Cook: Recent and Past Work, University Art Museum, University of New Mexico, Albuquerque, New Mexico, January 17 - March 19, 1989.
- 1990: Michael Cook, The Suite: Animal, Vegetable or Mineral? Alcove Exhibition, New in New Mexico, Museum of Fine Arts of the Museum of New Mexico, Santa Fe, New Mexico, March 3 - July 10, 1990.
- 1990: Michael Cook: Charity, large scale drawings, Shidoni Contemporary Gallery, Tesuque, New Mexico, March 2 - April 2, 1990.
- 1997: Instructions: Paintings 1991-1996, The Center for Contemporary Arts, Santa Fe, New Mexico November 22, 1996 - January 10, 1997.
- 1999: Michael Cook ..., Artemisia Gallery, Chicago, Illinois, September 30-October 30, 1999.
- 2000: Veneer: Paintings and A Video, University Art Museum, University of New Mexico, Albuquerque, January 11-March 5, 2000.
- 2004: Michael Cook: Painting and Video, Canfield Gallery, Santa Fe, New Mexico, November–December 2004.
- 2008: Museum Window, The University Art Museum, The University of New Mexico, Albuquerque, July – September 2008.
- 2011: Venetian, David Richard Contemporary, Santa Fe, New Mexico, August 2–28, 2011. (9)
- 2013: Camino Real, David Richard Contemporary, Santa Fe, New Mexico, July 2–27, 2013.
- 2014: Michael Cook: The Notion of Landscape, The Francis McCray Gallery of Contemporary Art, Western New Mexico University, Silver City, New Mexico.

=== Group exhibitions ===
- 1978: The 77th Annual Exhibition by Artists of Chicago and Vicinity: Works on Paper, Art Institute of Chicago, Illinois, November - December 1978.
- 1979: Video Tapes and Drawings, Hunter Gallery, New York, New York, November 1979.
- 1980: New Dimension - Time, Museum of Contemporary Art, Chicago, Illinois, February 22 - April 27, 1980.
- 1981: Working Drawings, Hunter Gallery, New York, New York, Randolph Street Gallery, Chicago, Illinois, June–July 1981.
- 1984: Disarming Images: Film & Video, Contemporary Arts Center, Cincinnati, Ohio, October 1984.
- 1984: The End of the World: Contemporary Visions of the Apocalypse, The New Museum of Contemporary Art, New York, New York, December 10, 1983 - January 22, 1984.
- 1987: Small Works Invitational, Janet Steinberg Gallery, San Francisco, California, December 3–19, 1987
- 1988: New Work From the Bay Area, Boulder Museum of Contemporary Art, Boulder, Colorado, January 8 - February 11, 1988.
- 1989: 20 x 24, Jayne Baum Gallery, New York, New York, June 25 - July 20, 1989
- 1990: Playing With Fire, Center for Contemporary Art, Santa Fe, New Mexico, November 9 - December 15, 1990.
- 1993: 21 Steps, University Art Museum, University of Arizona, Tucson, Arizona, March 22 - April 28, 1993.
- 1993: Worlds at Risk: Dangerous Environments and Vanishing Traditions, Cambridge Multi-Cultural Arts Center, Cambridge, Massachusetts, September 30 - December 30, 1993.
- 1995: Re-Inventing the Emblem: Contemporary Artists Recreate a Renaissance Idea, Yale University Art Gallery, New Haven, Connecticut, January 20 - March 26, 1995.
- 1998: Technological Bottom Feeders, ARTCITE INC., Windsor, Ontario, Canada, May 29- June 27, 1998.
- 1999: Why Albuquerque? An Enquiry into Art and Place, Magnifico Festival of the Arts, Albuquerque Museum, September 24- October 3, 1999.
- 2002: Polaroid: The New Mexico Connection, University Art Museum, University of New Mexico, Albuquerque, January 15 - April 14, 2002.
- 2002: New American Paintings, Juried Exhibition in Print, #42, The Open Studios Press, Boston, Mass., October 2002.
- 2005: Modern and Contemporary, Canfield Gallery, Aug-September 2005
- 2010: Albuquerque Now – Winter, The Albuquerque Museum of Art and History, January 24 – April 18, 2010.
- 2014: New American Paintings, Juried Exhibition in Print, #114 The Open Studios Press, Boston, Mass., October 2014.

== Recognitions ==
He has received several awards, including the Illinois Arts Council Individual Visual Artist Fellowship, Outstanding Teacher of the Year, and a significant National Endowment for the Arts Individual Artists Fellowship.

== Personal life ==
Cook married the artist Vera Henderson Sprunt, the granddaughter of James Sprunt, in 1992. They have two children, Nigel R. Cook and Avery A. Cook.
