= Ron Foster (footballer) =

English footballer (1938–2017)

Personal information
- Full name: Ronald Edmund Foster
- Date of birth: 22 November 1938
- Place of birth: Islington, England
- Date of death: 28 July 2017 (aged 78)
- Place of death: Reading, England
- Position: Inside forward

Youth career
- 1956–1957: Clapton

Senior career*
| Years | Team | Apps | (Gls) |
| 1957–1962 | Leyton Orient | 72 | (17) |
| 1962–1966 | Grimsby Town | 129 | (24) |
| 1966–1968 | Reading | 45 | (5) |
| 1968 | Dallas Tornado | 11 | (4) |
| 1968–1969 | Brentford | 4 | (0) |
| Total | | 261 | (50) |
- * Club domestic league appearances and goals

Ronald Edmund Foster (22 November 1938 – 28 July 2017) was an English professional footballer who played as an inside forward. Active in both England and the United States between 1959 and 1969, Foster made over 250 career appearances for five teams.

== Career ==
Born in Islington, Foster played non-League football with Clapton before turning professional in 1959 with Leyton Orient. Foster also played in the Football League for Grimsby Town, Reading and Brentford, as well as in the North American Soccer League with the Dallas Tornado, before retiring in 1969.
