= Micky Cook (footballer, born 1950) =

English footballer

Personal information
- Full name: Michael John Cook
- Date of birth: 25 January 1950 (age 76)
- Place of birth: Belmont, England
- Position: Forward

Youth career
- ?–1968: Crystal Palace

Senior career*
Years	Team	Apps	(Gls)
1968–1969	Crystal Palace	1	(0)
1969–1970	Brentford	20	(4)
1970–1971	Folkestone		
- * Club domestic league appearances and goals

Michael J. Cook (born 25 January 1950) is an English former professional footballer who played in the Football League, as a forward. He began his youth career at Crystal Palace and signed professional terms in February 1968. He made just one League appearance in May of that year and in August 1969 moved on to Brentford where he played 20 times in season 1969–1970 (scoring four goals) before moving into non-league football with Folkestone.
