= Brian Caterer =

English footballer and manager

Personal information
- Full name: Brian John Caterer
- Date of birth: 31 January 1943
- Place of birth: Hayes, England
- Date of death: 21 January 2010 (aged 66)
- Place of death: Barnet, England
- Position: Centre half

Senior career*
Years	Team	Apps	(Gls)
1961–1962	Hayes		
1962–1964	Uxbridge		
1964–1965	Chesham United		
1965–1966	Southall		
1967–1968	Chesham United		
1968	Hayes		
1968	Leatherhead		
1968–1969	Brentford	1	(0)
1969–1970	Leatherhead		
1970–1971	Hayes		
1971–1972	Southall		
1973	Slough Town	2	(0)
- Maidenhead United

Managerial career
- 1977–1981: Windsor & Eton
- 1981–1982: Woking
- 1982: Leatherhead
- 1982–1986: Maidenhead United
- 1992–1993: Windsor & Eton
- * Club domestic league appearances and goals

Brian John Caterer (31 January 1943 – 21 January 2010) was an English professional footballer and manager who made one appearance in the Football League for Brentford. Either side of his spell with Brentford, he had a long career as a centre half in non-League football. He began his career in management as an assistant at Maidenhead United, before becoming a manager in his own right.

== Career statistics ==
Appearances and goals by club, season and competition
Club	Season	League			FA Cup		League Cup		Total	
Club	Season	Division	Apps	Goals	Apps	Goals	Apps	Goals	Apps	Goals
Brentford	1968–69	Fourth Division	1	0	0	0	0	0	1	0
Slough Town	1973–74	Isthmian League Second Division	2	0	—		—		2	0
Career total			3	0	0	0	0	0	3	0

== Honours ==
Windsor & Eton

- Athenian League: 1979–80, 1980–81
