= Jimmy Sirrel =

Scottish footballer and manager

Personal information
- Full name: James Sirrel
- Date of birth: 2 February 1922
- Place of birth: Glasgow, Scotland
- Date of death: 25 September 2008 (aged 86)
- Place of death: Nottingham, England
- Position: Inside forward

Senior career*
Years	Team	Apps	(Gls)
- Renfrew
1946–1949	Celtic	13	(2)
1949–1951	Bradford Park Avenue	12	(2)
1951–1954	Brighton & Hove Albion	55	(16)
1954–1957	Aldershot	31	(3)
Total		111	(23)

Managerial career
- 1967–1969: Brentford
- 1969–1975: Notts County
- 1975–1977: Sheffield United
- 1977–1982: Notts County
- 1985–1987: Notts County
- * Club domestic league appearances and goals

James Sirrel (2 February 1922 – 25 September 2008) was a Scottish football player and manager.

Born in Glasgow, Sirrel began his career with Celtic before moving to England, spending most of his playing career with Brighton & Hove Albion.

Starting his management career in the Fourth Division with Brentford, Sirrel moved to Notts County where he achieved promotion to the Second Division, and then after a spell at Sheffield United returned to Notts County to achieve promotion to the First Division for the first time since 1926. He is regarded as the club’s greatest ever manager, with the County Road Stand at Notts County's Meadow Lane named after him and a statue of him and assistant Jack Wheeler on Meadow Lane.

== Playing career ==
Born in Glasgow, Sirrel started his professional career at Celtic in 1946, but made just 13 appearances in three years before signing for Bradford Park Avenue in 1949, but again failed to get regular first team football, playing only 12 matches. In 1951 he joined Brighton & Hove Albion, where he made 55 appearances before signing for Aldershot in 1954. He retired from playing in 1957.

== Coaching career ==
=== Brentford ===
Sirrel moved to Brentford as trainer in February 1965, before accepting the job of caretaker manager in February 1967. After being appointed to the role full-time, he spent two full seasons at the helm of Brentford where the club finished in 14th and 11th-placed positions in the Fourth Division. The 1969–70 season started well for Brentford and by November they were mounting a decent challenge for automatic promotion to Division Three. However, at the beginning of that month it was announced that Sirrel would be leaving Griffin Park to join Notts County as their new manager.

=== Notts County ===
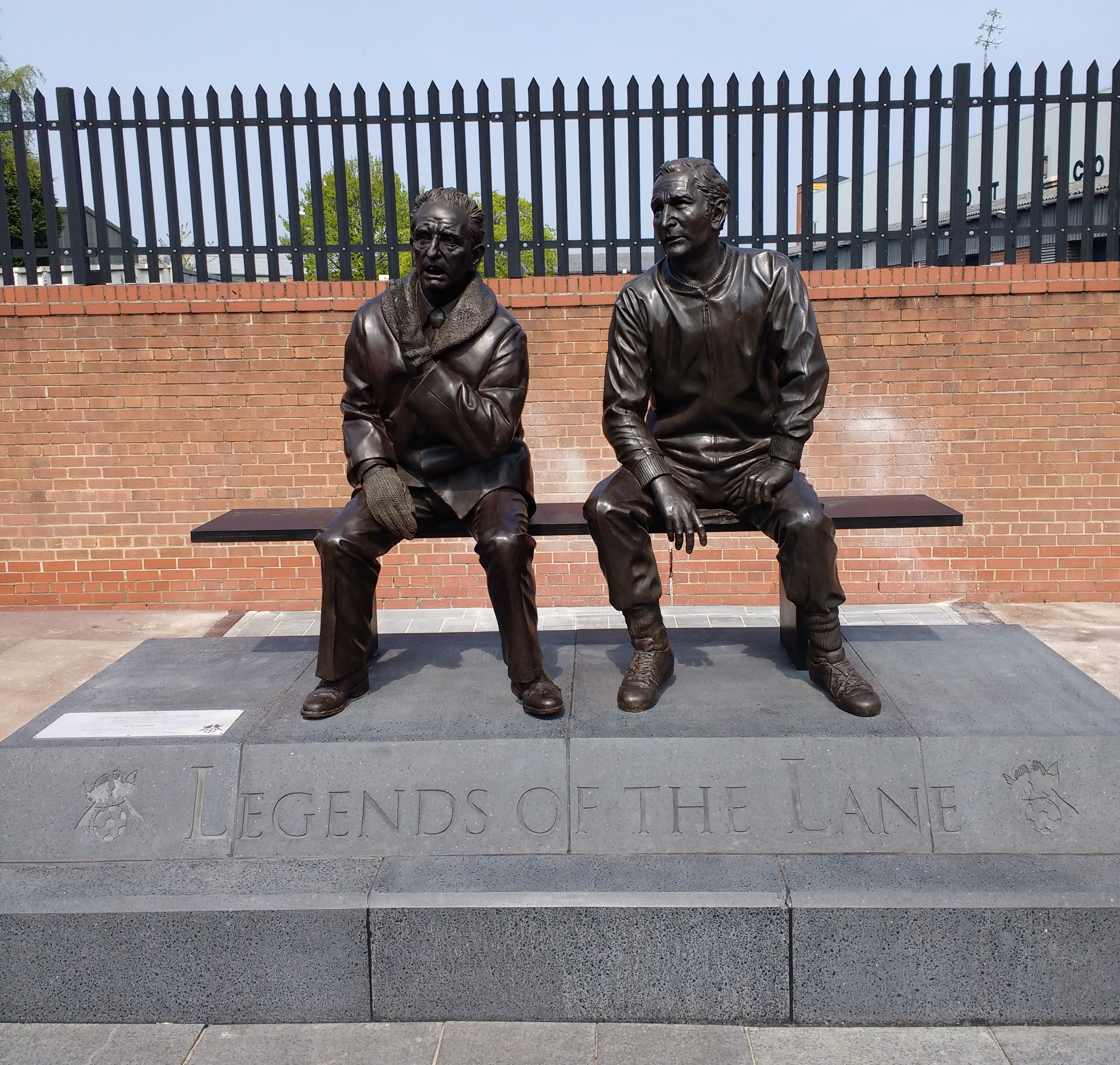
Jimmy & Jack statue at Meadow Lane

Upon taking his new position Sirrel said "Ask any kid what he knows about Notts County and he'll tell you they're the oldest football team in the world. By the time I've finished he'll know a lot more," immediately endearing himself amongst Notts County supporters.

From previous managers Jack Wheeler and Billy Gray, Sirrel had inherited a team including Don Masson, David Needham, Bob Worthington and Les Bradd, and his team would become increasingly difficult to beat. His first season in charge of the Magpies ended with a respectable seventh-place finish after several seasons of struggle on the pitch and financial woes off it.

The following season the Magpies stormed their way to the Fourth Division Championship. It would be the end of September before the Magpies would be beaten and the season would be completed without a single defeat at Meadow Lane. Sirrel built a solid defence, difficult to break down which would concede just 36 goals, while in front of goal, Sirrel built an equally impressive goalscoring side which would score an average of 2.47 goals per game.

The following season Notts excelled again, missing out on a second successive promotion by three points. Sirrel's status as a Notts County legend was fast becoming confirmed.

The 1972–73 season started off slowly for the Magpies and by the end of the year they were languishing in 16th place. However, Notts would lose just twice more all season and secure second place and promotion into the Second Division following a final day 4–1 victory over Tranmere Rovers.

Sirrel had overseen a transformation of Notts which had seen them go from Division Four strugglers to a Division Two side in little under four years. For the next two seasons, the Magpies would finish with respectable midtable positions and looked to be heading that way again during 1975–76. Sirrel however announced that he would leave Notts County for Sheffield United and was appointed their new manager on 21 October 1975, replacing Ken Furphy.

=== Sheffield United ===
The Blades had suffered an awful start to their First Division season and were bottom having recorded just one win in 13 games up to Sirrel's appointment. Despite his best efforts, he was unable to motivate his players and the Blades would record just five more wins and finish the season relegated in bottom place.

With little money to spend, Sirrel was unable to stop the slide at Bramall Lane and the following season United finished 11th in the Second Division. The 1977–78 season started in similar fashion and on 27 September 1977, Sirrel left Bramall Lane with United struggling at the foot of the table. He returned to Notts County, who were also going through a hard time.

Sirrel is the designer of the present Sheffield United club badge. Up until Sirrel's tenure in charge at Bramall Lane, the Blades used Sheffield's coat of arms. This was until Sheffield City Council copyrighted it, forcing the Blades to look elsewhere for a badge. Sirrel sat down and designed the badge that is still used today.

=== Return to Notts County ===
Sirrel returned on 5 October 1977 and found a Magpies side struggling to avoid relegation back into Division Three. Sirrel was able to save Notts from the drop with the club eventually finishing in a respectable 15th place. The following season saw Notts record a 6th-placed finish but the season after that the Magpies struggled again, finishing in 17th place.

The 1980–81 season would go down as perhaps Sirrel's finest achievement as manager of Notts County. Including a new generation of players bought in by Sirrel and the returning Don Masson, the Magpies would finish the season in second place, and a 2–0 win over Chelsea at Stamford Bridge confirmed that the Magpies would be playing First Division football for the first time since 1926.

Despite pre-season predictions of immediate relegation, Notts County secured a 15th-place finish during their first season back in the First Division.

Sirrel brought in Howard Wilkinson to be a head coach for Notts County's second season in the Division One. Sirrel continued on as General Manager and the club subsequently managed a comfortable 15th-placed finish.

Staying on as General Manager, a new coach came in for the Magpies' third season of top flight football. Larry Lloyd had previously won silverware with Nottingham Forest. However, the Magpies' were relegated into Division Two at the end of the season. Lloyd was dismissed the following season with the Magpies staring a second consecutive relegation in the face and Sirrel was again appointed manager in an unsuccessful attempt to avoid the drop.

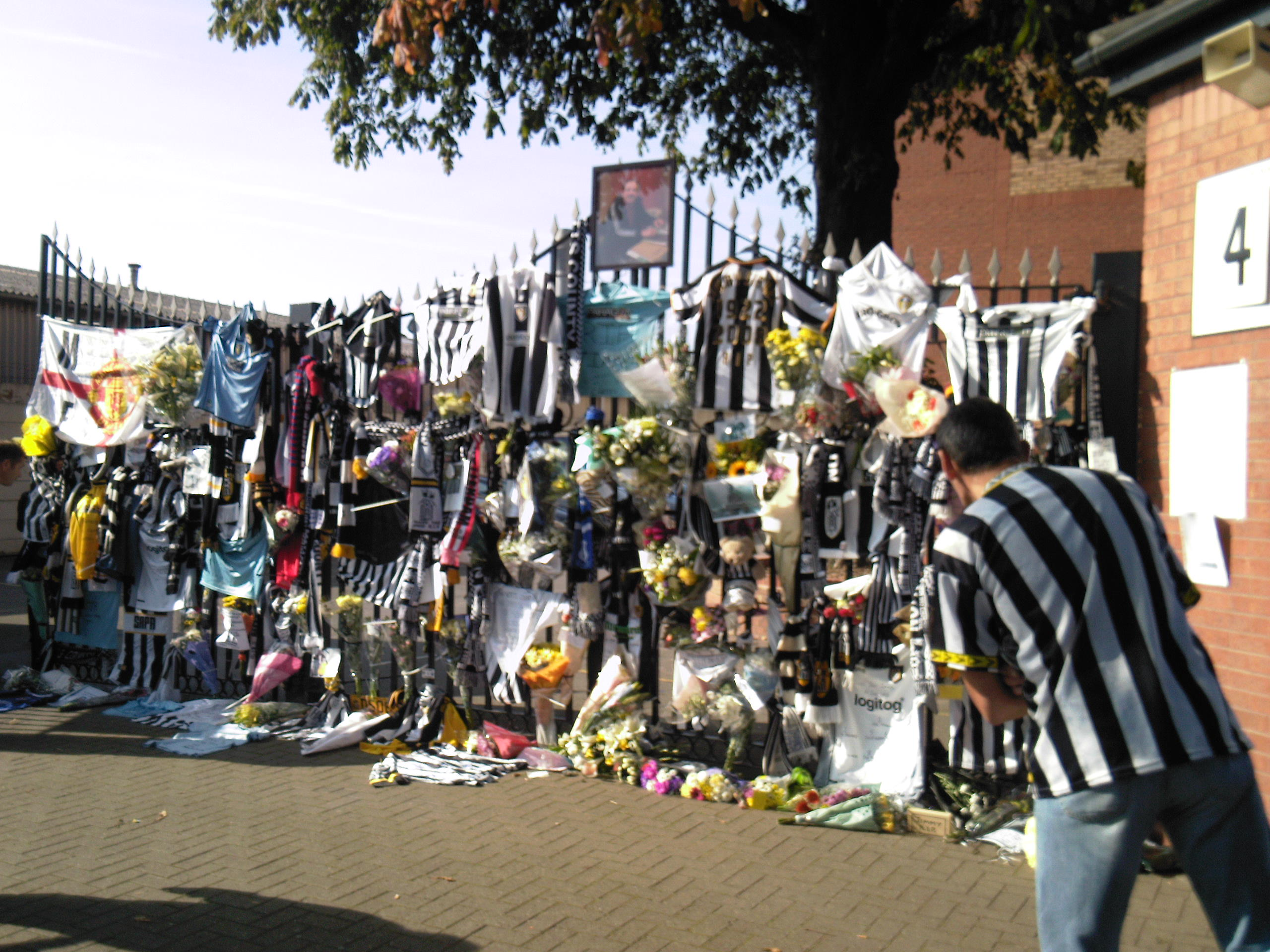
Tributes paid by Notts County supporters at Meadow Lane to Sirrel after he died in 2008.

The 1985–86 season began in the Third Division and with financial difficulty brewing, Sirrel would oversee two midtable finishes over the next seasons. His retirement as Notts County manager came at the end of the 1986–87 season, eighteen years after he arrived at the club. He then became chief scout for Derby County.

In 1993, the newly redeveloped County Road Stand at Notts County's Meadow Lane was renamed the Jimmy Sirrel Stand in his honour:

Derek Pavis phoned me up one day and asked if they could name a stand after me. I said it would be a bloody honour! Hopefully it would remain there for many, many years. It's really a wonderful accolade.

== Personal life ==
Apart from football, Sirrel was a keen gardener and enjoyed bowls.

Sirrel died aged 86 on 25 September 2008.

Sirrel was buried on 7 October 2008 as fans and great figures from the world of football alike turned out to pay their respects to the Magpies legend.
