= West London derby =

Football match

- Locations of the four clubs in the London boroughs of Hounslow (left) and Hammersmith and Fulham (right).
- Location: West London
- Teams: 1 Brentford; 2 Chelsea; 3 Fulham; 4 Queens Park Rangers
- First meeting: 1883; St Andrews 1–0 Christ Church Rangers
- Latest meeting: 18 September 2026; Premier League; Brentford 3–0 Chelsea
- Next meeting: 12 December 2026; Premier League; Fulham v Brentford
- Stadiums: Brentford Community Stadium; Stamford Bridge; Craven Cottage; Loftus Road

Statistics
- Total meetings: 366
- Most wins: Chelsea (86)
- Largest victory: Queens Park Rangers 6–0 Chelsea; Football League First Division, 31 March 1986; Fulham 6–0 Queens Park Rangers; Premier League, 2 October 2011

The West London derby is a local football rivalry in English football played between any two of Brentford, Chelsea, Fulham, and Queens Park Rangers, all of which are situated within West London.

This particular derby is less prominent than other major city rivalries in English football, largely because the clubs have frequently competed in separate divisions. For example, Chelsea did not face Fulham between 1986 and 2001 and played Brentford only seven times between 1950 and 2021. Similarly, QPR did not face Brentford between 1966 and 2001 and did not play Chelsea between 1996 and 2008. The fixture between Chelsea and Fulham is the most common matchup in the derby, yet it has taken place fewer than 100 times. By contrast, the North London derby has been contested almost 200 times, and the Merseyside derby over 230 times.

While the clubs share geographic proximity, Chelsea operates at a higher statistical and competitive tier than the other three teams. Chelsea has secured multiple top-flight league titles as well as European and international honours, whereas QPR holds one domestic cup which was won in 1967, and neither Fulham nor Brentford has ever won a major top-flight trophy. The 2011–12 season marked the first instance of three West London clubs competing in the top flight simultaneously: Chelsea, QPR, and Fulham. This occurred for a second time during the 2022–23 season with the inclusion of Brentford, Chelsea, and Fulham. All three teams have since retained their top-flight status through the 2025–26 campaign.

== Summary ==
=== Brentford vs Chelsea derby ===
There is very little rivalry between Brentford and Chelsea, mainly due to the fact that they have been in different divisions for over 60 years. The only time that the two clubs ever shared a division until recently was in the old First Division between 1935 and 1947, but despite the fact that both clubs are local to each other, it was never seen as a big rivalry to either side, as Chelsea had been in the Football League for a longer period of time than Brentford and had stronger rivalries with the likes of West Ham United, Arsenal and Tottenham Hotspur, whereas Brentford's main rivals are Fulham and QPR. Also, Brentford developed a bigger sporting rivalry with Arsenal during the 1930s as both clubs vied for the title of being London's number one club.

The only bad feeling between the clubs was soon after Chelsea's foundation and admission into the Football League in 1905, the other West London clubs, including Brentford, lost many supporters and potential supporters to the only professional Football League club in the area. Other than that, Brentford and Chelsea have always had fairly good relations, even amongst supporters. In fact, during the 1970s many Chelsea fans would come down to Griffin Park if their club were playing away. Chelsea reserves played their games at Griffin Park, and occasionally a pre season friendly is staged between the two clubs.

Brentford and Chelsea met for the first time since 1950 on 27 January 2013 in an FA Cup fourth round tie at Griffin Park which ended in a 2–2 draw. Chelsea won the replay on 17 February 2013 at Stamford Bridge 4–0.

With Brentford gaining promotion to the Premier League for the 2021–22 season, the first time in 74 years, and Fulham's relegation the previous season, this was the only West London derby in the Premier League for the season. The first game was hosted at The Bees' new Brentford Community Stadium on 16 October 2021, which Chelsea won 1–0. Brentford won the return fixture at Stamford Bridge 4–1, with goals including a brace from Vitaly Janelt and Christian Eriksen's first goal for Brentford.

Their latest meeting was on 15 December 2024 when Chelsea won 2–1 at Stamford Bridge in a Premier League match which saw Marc Cucurella score his first Premier League goal for the club and also saw him get sent off after the final whistle. Brentford finished the 2022–23 season above Chelsea in the league table for the first time since 1939, with a ninth place finish compared to Chelsea's 12th.

=== Brentford vs Fulham derby ===
Fulham and Brentford have competed at the same level for a few periods in their history with the rivalry being fiercest during Fulham's descent to the lower leagues in the 1980s and early 90's. The two teams frequently competed between the 1920s and the 1950s in the Football League's various divisions. These games always drew bumper crowds and often caused tension on the pitch and the terraces. However, Fulham's fortunes on the pitch changed and they went on to play in the upper leagues for several decades until the two sides were to meet regularly again from 1980 onwards, a time when the rivalry was most heated. Fulham later went on to win the London Derby cup.

The two clubs spent a majority of seasons in the same division until the 1997–98 Division Two campaign, which ended with Brentford suffering relegation to Division Three. Despite Brentford's promotion straight back to Division Two as Division Three champions in the 1998–99 season, Fulham were crowned Division Two champions and ascended to the Premier League as Division One champions in 2001.

The 2014–15 Football League Championship season brought Brentford and Fulham together in the same division for the first time since 1998, following Brentford's promotion from League One and Fulham's relegation from the Premier League.

Prior to meeting in the league, the two sides were drawn together in the League Cup second round on 26 August 2014, with Fulham winning 1–0 at Griffin Park. It was the clubs' first meeting in any competitive fixture since a 2–0 league victory to Fulham on 11 April 1998.

On August 4, 2020, Fulham would win promotion to the English Premier League defeating Brentford at an empty-on-account-of-Covid Wembley Stadium. The Championship Match of the English Football League Playoffs would go to extra-time with Fulham narrowly winning by a score of 2-1. Fulham's Joe Bryan scored a remarkable free kick from near 40 yards out; catching Brentford's goalkeeper, David Raya, out of position in the 105th minute. Bryan would go on to score another goal in the 117th minute. Brentford netted a consolation in the 120th through Henrik Dalsgaard.

In March 2023 the rivalry was said by the BBC to be "growing".

=== Brentford vs QPR derby ===
As with Fulham, Brentford and QPR played each other frequently in local cup competitions and leagues from the foundation of both clubs. In 1920, the Football League absorbed many clubs from the Southern Football League, including Brentford and QPR, who competed in the old Third Division (South) regularly in the 1920s, until Brentford's rise up the leagues in the 1930s. After the Second World War, they spent practically every season in the same division for the next 20 years. At the time, the fixture was each side's biggest game of the season and always attracted a big crowd. However, in 1966, despite an opening day 6–1 thrashing of their local rivals, Brentford were ultimately relegated whilst QPR were promoted and went on to enjoy many seasons in the upper leagues.

However, the bad feeling between the clubs runs deeper than just locality. In 1967, QPR attempted a takeover of Brentford, which would have resulted in QPR moving into Griffin Park and Brentford F.C. ceasing to exist. The story infamously broke in the London press but Brentford supporters rallied to save their club. Since then, relations between the clubs have been frosty. The rivalry resumed in 2001 and continued for several seasons until Rangers were promoted. During this time, the rivalry was intensified by Brentford player Martin Rowlands leaving to join QPR. He then went on to kiss his badge on several occasions in front of the Brentford support when the two sides met in 2003 at Loftus Road.

The most recent meeting between Brentford and Queens Park Rangers was in 2021, with QPR winning 2–1 at Loftus Road on 17 February 2021.

=== Chelsea vs Fulham derby ===
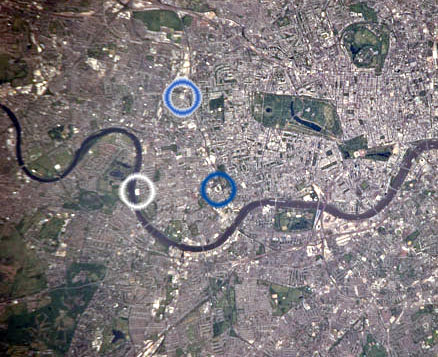
Few English football teams are as geographically close as neighbours as Fulham and Chelsea. This satellite image of West London shows Fulham's Craven Cottage (circled in white) and Chelsea's Stamford Bridge (blue), just 2.2 km apart. QPR's Loftus Road ground is also shown to the north (blue edged in white). Brentford's ground is just beyond the left (west) of the satellite image, above the bend in the River Thames.

Often called the Fulham Derby due to the fact both teams are situated in the former borough of Fulham, it differentiates from other rivalries in English football, such as the North London derby and the Merseyside derby, Chelsea and Fulham have spent much of their existence in separate divisions – between 1968 and 2001, the two were in the same division only five times – and have rarely been rivals for the major honours or played in many high-profile matches. This has greatly limited the scope for it to develop and actually served to weaken it.

In 1904, businessman Gus Mears approached the Fulham chairman Henry Norris about moving the club from their Craven Cottage home to the nearby Stamford Bridge Athletics Ground on the Fulham Road, which he had recently acquired. Norris declined following a dispute over the rent; as a result, Mears formed his own club to occupy the ground, Chelsea. Fulham thus had an indirect role in Chelsea's foundation. It also ensured that, despite Chelsea's name, there were two clubs in the Fulham Borough. The geographical proximity of the teams is the basis for the rivalry, rather than religious or political reasons, as with other derbies.

The first competitive match between the sides took place on 3 December 1910 in the Second Division, with a crowd of 35,000 at Craven Cottage watching Fulham win 1–0. The peak of the rivalry was arguably during the inter-war years and just after, when matches between the sides were always among the most popular (and most highly attended) on the fixture calendar. While both clubs were largely unsuccessful until the 1960s, they have since drifted apart and the significance of matches between them has correspondingly declined. Chelsea enjoyed successful spells during the 1960s and 1970s, and again from the mid-1990s to the present day, while Fulham spent much of that period in the lower divisions of the Football League. As a caveat to that, when Chelsea and Fulham did meet in league games in the 1970s and 1980s, the attendances were always among the highest for the season, with the lack of regular matches often making the derby more eagerly anticipated.

The reduced number of encounters saw Chelsea fans develop rivalries with other teams, notably Leeds United, other London clubs such as Tottenham Hotspur and Arsenal. Fulham also formed rivalries with other teams from London like Brentford and QPR. All these reduced the prominence of the West London Derby. That is less true for Fulham fans, with the fact that their nearest neighbours have been more successful ensuring that matches against Chelsea retain a David vs Goliath factor. Fulham returned to the top division in 2001, putting the clubs in the same division for the first time since 1983–84.

On 19 March 2006, Fulham beat Chelsea 1–0 for the first time in 27 years with a goal from Luis Boa Morte. The match was marred by controversy and crowd trouble and has arguably rekindled the derby somewhat. Chelsea gained revenge for this defeat on 23 September with a 2–0 win at Craven Cottage, in which Frank Lampard struck twice. Thankfully, there was little trouble before and after the game, due to appeals for calm from managers and players of both clubs and a much higher than normal police presence, to deter fans from entering the pitch after the game. Two of the last games to be played at Stamford Bridge have both been close contests. On 30 December 2006, they played out a 2–2 draw, with Carlos Bocanegra getting a late equaliser for Fulham (earlier in the match Moritz Volz had scored the 15,000th goal in Premier League history. On 29 September 2007, they settled for a 0–0 draw. This draw was Avram Grant's first West London derby in charge of Chelsea and the same for Lawrie Sanchez of Fulham. During the 2008–09 season, Chelsea defeated Fulham 3–1 under Guus Hiddink, with goals from Nicolas Anelka, Florent Malouda and Didier Drogba, with Anelka's goal coming after just 51 seconds. In the 2009–10 season, Chelsea defeated Fulham at Craven Cottage with a 2–0 win, thanks to goals from Didier Drogba and Nicolas Anelka. The win was Carlo Ancelotti's first London derby. In the 2011–12 season, both teams drew their home and away fixtures. In the 2012–13 season, both sides played out a 0–0 draw at Stamford Bridge, Chelsea won the reverse fixture 3–0 away at Craven Cottage. Chelsea won the home clash 2–0 with goals from Oscar and Mikel John Obi on 21 September 2013. On 1 March 2013, Chelsea won 3–1 at Craven Cottage with André Schürrle netting a hat-trick for Chelsea. Fulham finished in 19th place at the end of the 2013–14 Premier League season and were relegated to the Football League Championship for the 2014–15 season, meaning that the two sides would sit in different divisions again after 13 years in the same division.

Their latest result was Chelsea 3–2 away victory on 24 August 2026 in a Premier League match.

=== Chelsea vs QPR derby ===
Despite QPR being members of the Football League since 1920, the two sides did not meet in a competitive match until 1968–69, when Rangers made their debut in the First Division. Overall, Chelsea do not consider QPR rivals due to the size difference of the two clubs. Their first match took place on 14 September 1968; Chelsea won 4–0. Since then, the sides have met a further 45 times, making it the most common West London derby since the 1960s. The clubs developed a rivalry in the 1960s and 1970s when both were playing top-flight football and competing to be among London's top sides, with Chelsea winning the FA Cup, Cup Winners' Cup and League Cup, and Rangers winning the League Cup and finishing as league runners-up by a single point.

Many QPR fans' favourite game against Chelsea was a 6–0 victory on Easter Monday in 1986. Chelsea were second in the league table at the time, and the result all but ended their title challenge. During this period, the clubs were relatively evenly matched, although Chelsea were always considered the bigger club, with both occasionally dropping into the Second Division in the late 1970s and early 1980s, so they met in almost every season. The teams met in a competitive match for the first time since 1996, when drawn to face each other in the FA Cup 3rd Round on 5 January 2008. Chelsea won 1–0 thanks to a first-half own goal by Lee Camp.

In recent times, Chelsea have become one of the dominant forces in the English game, whereas QPR were in the second tier of English football for many years. The links between the two clubs have been maintained through numerous on-loan players; two of Chelsea's best youth team players joined QPR on loan for the 2006–07 season. These players were Jimmy Smith and Michael Mancienne. Mancienne renewed his loan for the 2007–08 season.

QPR and Chelsea have competed in two pre-season friendlies since the turn of the century. The most recent was in 2003 when Chelsea thrashed a QPR Legends XI 7–0. On 28 July 2001, QPR stunned the £50 million Chelsea line-up by beating them 3–1. Jesper Grønkjær gave Chelsea a first-half lead, but QPR got an equaliser from Leroy Griffiths and then took lead from a long range effort by Karl Connolly. QPR confirmed the win when Gavin Peacock, also a former Chelsea player, scored late on.

Mirroring Chelsea's purchase by Russian billionaire Roman Abramovich, QPR have received investment from Flavio Briatore, Bernie Ecclestone and Lakshmi Mittal. The fact that the Mittal family, who own a 20% stake in the club, are reputed to be five times as rich as Abramovich has seen QPR fans dub themselves the world's richest club.

On 30 August 2009, Chelsea were drawn against QPR in the third round of the 2009–10 Football League Cup, which saw Chelsea win the game 1–0 thanks to a goal from Salomon Kalou.

On 23 October 2011, Chelsea lost 1–0 to a newly promoted QPR in the first Premier League match between the sides since 1996. In a feisty encounter players clashed on several occasions, with nine Chelsea players and two QPR booked, with Chelsea's José Bosingwa and Didier Drogba being sent off. Heiðar Helguson scored the only goal of the match through a penalty. Chelsea manager André Villas-Boas was later charged by the FA for criticizing the performance of the referee Chris Foy, as he believed many of the big decisions made were incorrect. Chelsea were fined £20,000 by the FA for not controlling their players, who picked up a record number of bookings in a single match in the Premier League era, and their manager was fined £12,000 for his comments on the referee in addition to being cautioned for future conduct. In the aftermath of the match, a video was posted on YouTube showing Chelsea and England captain John Terry allegedly racially abusing Anton Ferdinand, for which he has been charged with a racially aggravated public order offence. Chelsea then drew QPR again in the FA Cup, winning 1–0 at Loftus Road thanks to a Juan Mata penalty.

On 29 April 2012, Chelsea exacted revenge on QPR in the reverse league fixture with a ruthless 6–1 victory, with four goals being scored in a nightmare opening 25 minutes for Rangers. Fernando Torres became the first player in over 20 years to score a hat-trick in this West London Derby. It was QPR, however, who had the last laugh. After holding Chelsea to a 0–0 draw at Loftus Road on 15 September 2012, they went on to beat Chelsea 1–0 in the reverse fixture on 2 January 2013 at Stamford Bridge, with the goal coming from former Chelsea player Shaun Wright-Phillips, ending a 30-year wait for a win at the Bridge for Rangers. QPR finished the 2012–13 Premier League season in last place, however, and were relegated to the Championship. They were promoted to the Premier League again for the 2014–15 season after winning the 2014 Football League Championship play-off final 1–0 against Derby County at Wembley Stadium on 24 May 2014. On 12 April 2015, Chelsea beat QPR 0–1 with Cesc Fàbregas scoring the goal in the 88th minute. This sent Chelsea seven points clear at the top of the table ahead of Arsenal. QPR remained in the relegation zone, two points away from safety.

=== Fulham vs QPR derby ===
The origins of a rivalry between Fulham and QPR date back before Chelsea were formed. In 1892 the two teams met at Kensal Rise to play in the West London Cup Final. QPR were 3–2 victors and won their first piece of silverware. For the next few seasons QPR continued to win the cup, whilst Fulham won The West London League. In recent times, however, QPR and Fulham derbies are not common as both teams have been in different divisions for all but two seasons since the Premier League first started in 1992. As two very similar clubs in size, history and fan base, derbies, are at times, fiercer and more competitive than those against Chelsea, sometimes leading to cases of crowd trouble such as a riot between the two sets of fans in 1999.

From 2002 until 2004, QPR and Fulham were closer than they had ever been when the two clubs shared Loftus Road while Craven Cottage was being redeveloped. This added extra spice to a derby had they drawn each other in the cup, especially had QPR been the away team at their own ground.

The matches during the 2000–01 season both ended up being 2–0 to Fulham. The game at Loftus Road saw Richard Langley and Clarke Carlisle – two of QPR's best players – seriously injured in the game and both were out for 18 months with cruciate ligament injuries; this was vital for QPR's descent into the third tier for the first time in 34 years.

QPR were promoted to the Premier League for the 2011–12 season, meaning the derby would take place for the first time in over ten years and in the Premier League for the first time. The first match finished in a 6–0 victory for Fulham, with Andy Johnson bagging a hat-trick.

The return fixture between the two sides is sure to ignite the rivalry as QPR have recently come under the managerial guidance of Mark Hughes, who was the manager of Fulham the previous season and left under controversial circumstances, citing the clubs' lack of ambition and stature as his reasons. With a last-minute controversial switch by Bobby Zamora to the Hoops, at the end of the January transfer window, Fulham's first return to their former temporary ground was a spicy affair. Samba Diakité was sent off in the first half, and Zamora's replacement, Pavel Pogrebnyak scored the only goal of the game, meaning Fulham had done the double over QPR in the league. The following season, Rangers were on a dismal run of form without a win in seventeen games and looking certain for relegation. When the two sides met on 15 December 2012 at Loftus Road, it was Adel Taarabt who took the Hoops to their first win of the season over their bitter rivals in a strong 2–1 victory. Fulham won the reverse fixture 3–2 when the two sides met on 1 April 2013 at Craven Cottage. In 2015–16, the clubs met once more in the Championship, and Fulham convincingly won both fixtures, in both cases being 3–0 up before half-time.

In the 2019–20 season, the two teams played the same division again since Fulham were relegated after finishing 19th in the Premier League. However, at the end of the season, Fulham were promoted back to the Premier League after finishing 4th in the table and winning the EFL Championship play-off final.

Their latest meeting was a 2–0 victory for Fulham at Loftus Road on 2 April 2022 in a Championship match.

== Results ==
=== Aggregated results ===
As of 24 August 2026

	Played	Won	Drawn	Lost	For	Against	Win %
Brentford	178	66	50	62	230	210	37.08
Chelsea	172	86	51	35	252	174	50.00
Fulham	205	59	53	93	223	275	28.78
QPR	177	53	50	74	205	251	29.94
Total	732	263	204	263	910	910	—

=== Brentford vs Chelsea ===
Competition	Played	Brentford wins	Draws	Chelsea wins	Brentford goals	Chelsea goals
League	21	8	5	8	29	24
FA Cup	4	0	1	3	2	11
League Cup	1	0	0	1	0	2
Total	26	8	6	12	31	37

List of matches

#	Season	Date	Competition	Stadium	Home team	Result	Away team	Attendance	H2H
1	1935–36	23 November 1935	First Division	Stamford Bridge	Chelsea	2–1	Brentford	56,624	+1
2	1935–36	28 March 1936	First Division	Griffin Park	Brentford	2–1	Chelsea	33,486	0
3	1936–37	12 December 1936	First Division	Stamford Bridge	Chelsea	2–1	Brentford	51,079	+1
4	1936–37	17 April 1937	First Division	Griffin Park	Brentford	1–0	Chelsea	22,042	0
5	1937–38	23 October 1937	First Division	Stamford Bridge	Chelsea	2–1	Brentford	56,810	+1
6	1937–38	9 March 1938	First Division	Griffin Park	Brentford	1–1	Chelsea	20,401	+1
7	1938–39	22 October 1938	First Division	Griffin Park	Brentford	1–0	Chelsea	31,425	0
8	1938–39	25 February 1939	First Division	Stamford Bridge	Chelsea	1–3	Brentford	33,511	+1
9	1946–47	9 November 1946	First Division	Stamford Bridge	Chelsea	3–2	Brentford	50,242	0
10	1946–47	15 March 1947	First Division	Griffin Park	Brentford	0–2	Chelsea	33,498	+1
11	1949–50	7 January 1950	FA Cup	Griffin Park	Brentford	0–1	Chelsea	38,000	+2
12	2012–13	27 January 2013	FA Cup	Griffin Park	Brentford	2–2	Chelsea	12,146	+2
13	2012–13	17 February 2013	FA Cup	Stamford Bridge	Chelsea	4–0	Brentford	40,961	+3
14	2016–17	28 January 2017	FA Cup	Stamford Bridge	Chelsea	4–0	Brentford	41,042	+4
15	2021–22	16 October 2021	Premier League	Brentford Community Stadium	Brentford	0–1	Chelsea	16,940	+5
16	2021–22	22 December 2021	League Cup	Brentford Community Stadium	Brentford	0–2	Chelsea	16,577	+6
17	2021–22	2 April 2022	Premier League	Stamford Bridge	Chelsea	1–4	Brentford	39,061	+5
18	2022–23	19 October 2022	Premier League	Brentford Community Stadium	Brentford	0–0	Chelsea	17,118	+5
19	2022–23	26 April 2023	Premier League	Stamford Bridge	Chelsea	0–2	Brentford	39,929	+4
20	2023–24	28 October 2023	Premier League	Stamford Bridge	Chelsea	0–2	Brentford	39,575	+3
21	2023–24	2 March 2024	Premier League	Brentford Community Stadium	Brentford	2–2	Chelsea	17,140	+3
22	2024–25	15 December 2024	Premier League	Stamford Bridge	Chelsea	2–1	Brentford	39,571	+4
23	2024–25	5 April 2025	Premier League	Brentford Community Stadium	Brentford	0–0	Chelsea	17,183	+4
24	2025–26	13 September 2025	Premier League	Brentford Community Stadium	Brentford	2–2	Chelsea	16,795	+4
25	2025–26	17 January 2026	Premier League	Stamford Bridge	Chelsea	2–0	Brentford	39,704	+5
26	2026–27	18 September 2026	Premier League	Brentford Community Stadium	Brentford	3–0	Chelsea	17,193	+4

=== Brentford vs Fulham ===
Competition	Played	Brentford wins	Draws	Fulham wins	Brentford goals	Fulham goals
League	58	19	17	22	66	67
FA Cup	2	1	0	1	3	2
League Cup	6	4	1	1	10	3
Football League/EFL Trophy	3	1	1	1	3	2
EFL play-offs	1	0	0	1	1	2
Total	70	25	19	26	83	76

Last two results

Venue	Date	Competition	Brentford	Fulham
Brentford Community Stadium	18 April 2026	Premier League	0	0
Craven Cottage	20 September 2025	Premier League	1	3

=== Brentford vs QPR ===
Competition	Played	Brentford wins	Draws	QPR wins	Brentford goals	QPR goals
League	78	30	24	24	106	94
FA Cup	3	2	1	0	6	2
League Cup	1	1	0	0	4	1
Total	82	33	25	24	116	97

Last two results

Venue	Date	Competition	Brentford	QPR
Loftus Road	17 February 2021	Championship	1	2
Brentford Community Stadium	27 November 2020	Championship	2	1

=== Chelsea vs Fulham ===
Competition	Played	Chelsea wins	Draws	Fulham wins	Chelsea goals	Fulham goals
League	83	50	23	10	136	71
FA Cup	6	2	2	2	7	7
League Cup	4	2	2	0	4	2
Total	93	54	27	12	147	80

Last two results

Venue	Date	Competition	Chelsea	Fulham
Craven Cottage	24 August 2026	Premier League	3	2
Craven Cottage	7 January 2026	Premier League	1	2

=== Chelsea vs QPR ===
Competition	Played	Chelsea wins	Draws	QPR wins	Chelsea Goals	QPR goals
League	44	15	16	13	58	56
FA Cup	6	4	1	1	8	4
League Cup	3	1	1	1	2	3
Total	53	20	18	15	68	63

Last two results

Venue	Date	Competition	Chelsea	QPR
Loftus Road	12 April 2015	Premier League	1	0
Stamford Bridge	1 November 2014	Premier League	2	1

=== Fulham vs QPR ===
Competition	Played	Fulham wins	Draws	QPR wins	Fulham goals	QPR goals
League	36	16	6	14	57	43
FA Cup	5	4	1	0	8	2
League Cup	1	1	0	0	2	0
Total	42	21	7	14	67	45

List of matches

#	Season	Date	Competition	Stadium	Home team	Result	Away team	Attendance	H2H
1	1906–07	13 January 1906	FA Cup	Craven Cottage	Fulham	1–0	QPR	–	+1
2	1928–29	15 September 1928	Third Division South	Loftus Road	QPR	2–1	Fulham	21,085	0
3	1928–29	26 January 1929	Third Division South	Craven Cottage	Fulham	5–0	QPR	26,743	+1
4	1929–30	16 September 1929	Third Division South	Loftus Road	QPR	0–0	Fulham	12,491	+1
5	1929–30	3 May 1930	Third Division South	Craven Cottage	Fulham	0–2	QPR	17,030	0
6	1930–31	4 October 1930	Third Division South	Loftus Road	QPR	0–2	Fulham	14,280	+1
7	1930–31	7 February 1931	Third Division South	Craven Cottage	Fulham	0–2	QPR	18,955	0
8	1931–32	28 December 1931	Third Division South	Craven Cottage	Fulham	1–3	QPR	22,236	+1
9	1931–32	23 April 1932	Third Division South	White City Stadium	QPR	3–1	Fulham	21,572	+2
10	1948–49	2 October 1948	Second Division	Craven Cottage	Fulham	5–0	QPR	38,667	+1
11	1948–49	26 February 1949	Second Division	Loftus Road	QPR	1–0	Fulham	27,440	+2
12	1970–71	6 October 1970	League Cup	Craven Cottage	Fulham	2–0	QPR	–	+1
13	1971–72	31 August 1971	Second Division	Craven Cottage	Fulham	0–3	QPR	21,187	+2
14	1971–72	15 January 1972	FA Cup	Loftus Road	QPR	1–1	Fulham	–	+2
15	1971–72	18 January 1972	FA Cup	Craven Cottage	Fulham	2–1	QPR	–	+1
16	1971–72	25 April 1972	Second Division	Loftus Road	QPR	0–0	Fulham	20,605	+1
17	1972–73	17 October 1972	Second Division	Craven Cottage	Fulham	0–2	QPR	20,895	+2
18	1972–73	28 April 1973	Second Division	Loftus Road	QPR	2–0	Fulham	22,187	+3
19	1978–79	9 January 1979	FA Cup	Craven Cottage	Fulham	2–0	QPR	–	+2
20	1979–80	8 September 1979	Second Division	Loftus Road	QPR	3–0	Fulham	17,105	+3
21	1979–80	19 January 1980	Second Division	Craven Cottage	Fulham	0–2	QPR	11,539	+4
22	1982–83	7 September 1982	Second Division	Craven Cottage	Fulham	1–1	QPR	14,900	+4
23	1982–83	2 May 1983	Second Division	Loftus Road	QPR	3–1	Fulham	24,433	+5
24	1999–2000	18 September 1999	First Division	Craven Cottage	Fulham	1–0	QPR	16,623	+4
25	1999–2000	28 February 2000	First Division	Loftus Road	QPR	0–0	Fulham	16,308	+4
26	2000–01	31 January 2001	First Division	Loftus Road	QPR	0–2	Fulham	16,403	+3
27	2000–01	10 March 2001	First Division	Craven Cottage	Fulham	2–0	QPR	16,021	+2
28	2011–12	2 October 2011	Premier League	Craven Cottage	Fulham	6–0	QPR	26,766	+1
29	2011–12	25 February 2012	Premier League	Loftus Road	QPR	0–1	Fulham	18,015	0
30	2012–13	15 December 2012	Premier League	Loftus Road	QPR	2–1	Fulham	18,233	+1
31	2012–13	1 April 2013	Premier League	Craven Cottage	Fulham	3–2	QPR	25,117	0
32	2015–16	25 September 2015	Championship	Craven Cottage	Fulham	4–0	QPR	19,784	+1
33	2015–16	13 February 2016	Championship	Loftus Road	QPR	1–3	Fulham	17,335	+2
34	2016–17	1 October 2016	Championship	Craven Cottage	Fulham	1–2	QPR	19,609	+1
35	2016–17	21 January 2017	Championship	Loftus Road	QPR	1–1	Fulham	17,025	+1
36	2017–18	29 September 2017	Championship	Loftus Road	QPR	1–2	Fulham	16,415	+2
37	2017–18	17 March 2018	Championship	Craven Cottage	Fulham	2–2	QPR	23,347	+2
38	2019–20	22 November 2019	Championship	Craven Cottage	Fulham	2–1	QPR	18,320	+3
39	2019–20	30 June 2020	Championship	Loftus Road	QPR	1–2	Fulham	0 (Note: The match was played behind closed doors due to the COVID-19 pandemic in England.)	+4
40	2020–21	9 January 2021	FA Cup	Loftus Road	QPR	0–2	Fulham	0	+5
41	2021–22	16 October 2021	Championship	Craven Cottage	Fulham	4–1	QPR	18,371	+6
42	2021–22	2 April 2022	Championship	Loftus Road	QPR	0–2	Fulham	17,648	+7

== Notable matches ==
- QPR 3–2 Fulham (1892) – The West London Cup Final at Kensal Rise saw League winners Fulham take on the emerging QPR. Fulham were favourites, but QPR were not to be underestimated. They were just beginning to establish themselves as one of West London's top sides. Fulham had firmly established themselves as the best team in the area, because they had won the West London League for two years running. Fulham raced into a 2–0 lead and held it at half-time. QPR somehow managed to pull it back and won their first piece of silverware.
- Brentford 6–1 QPR (21 August 1965) – Brentford stormed to an opening day win at Griffin Park, but fortunes for both clubs changed shortly after. It was the last meeting between the two sides at Griffin Park for 35 years in a season which resulted in the relegation of Brentford. In early 1967, QPR attempted and failed to take over Brentford and Griffin Park, which would have resulted in the closure of Brentford FC.
- QPR 2–4 Chelsea (21 February 1970) – In 1970, Chelsea and QPR were drawn to face each other in the FA Cup quarter-finals. Chelsea's Alan Hudson described it as a "fantastic draw", owing to the rivalry between the two clubs. QPR fielded two former Chelsea players, Terry Venables and Barry Bridges, as well as their star striker, Rodney Marsh. In an entertaining match, despite the poor pitch, Chelsea were 2–0 up within eight minutes thanks to Peter Osgood and David Webb, before a twice-taken Venables penalty put Rangers back in contention. Osgood scored twice more to complete his hat-trick and put the result beyond doubt before Bridges grabbed a late consolation. Chelsea went on to win the cup that season.
- QPR 6–0 Chelsea (31 March 1986) – Chelsea had been title challengers for most of the season, but went into the match having lost 4–0 to West Ham United two days previously; this result all but ended their title challenge. Rangers striker Gary Bannister grabbed a hat-trick and fellow striker John Byrne scored twice to secure their biggest win over Chelsea. Towards the end of the game Chelsea's David Speedie was sent off for punching.
- Brentford 4–0 Fulham (26 April 1992) – In a Sunday morning fixture, Brentford secured promotion to the second tier of English football for the first time since 1954. Brentford raced into a four-goal lead by half time, including two goals in a minute.
- Chelsea 1–0 Fulham (14 April 2002) – The most important match between the clubs in recent years, an FA Cup semi-final at Villa Park. Newly promoted Fulham went into the match as underdogs, and were trying to reach their first final since 1975. By contrast, Chelsea were aiming for their third final in six seasons. John Terry scored the only goal with a deflected shot just before half-time.
- QPR 1–0 Brentford (11 November 2003) – A match steeped in controversy as throughout the game ex-Bee Martin Rowlands goaded the Brentford fans and at full-time, instead of celebrating with the home fans, he and several other QPR players walked over to the away end and goaded the Brentford fans.
- Fulham 1–0 Chelsea (19 March 2006) – Fulham secured their first win over Chelsea since 1979 with a goal from Luís Boa Morte in a heated and controversial match. Champions-elect Chelsea had a Didier Drogba goal disallowed for a handball and William Gallas sent off, with the latter incident sparking a mass brawl. After the final whistle, both sets of fans invaded the pitch, which led to some clashes and arrests.
- Fulham 6–0 QPR (2 October 2011) – The first competitive match between the two teams in a decade, and the first in the top flight. An Andy Johnson hat-trick, goals from Clint Dempsey and Bobby Zamora, and a Danny Murphy penalty annihilated Rangers. Adel Taarabt, who had been replaced at half-time, was seen waiting for a bus in Fulham Palace Road during the second half.
- QPR 1–0 Chelsea (23 October 2011) – QPR secured a first victory over Chelsea since 1995, courtesy of an early Heiðar Helguson penalty. Chelsea were down to nine men inside 40 minutes after José Bosingwa and Didier Drogba were both sent off, for denying a goalscoring opportunity and a reckless tackle respectively. Chelsea's captain John Terry was accused of racially abusing the QPR defender Anton Ferdinand during the match, for which he win stood trial in July 2012, being found not guilty. As a result of these allegations, Terry was stripped of the England captaincy by the FA. England's manager Fabio Capello resigned in protest against Terry's sacking.
- Chelsea 6–1 QPR (29 April 2012) – Chelsea avenged their previous 1–0 league defeat to QPR, with Fernando Torres scoring his first hat-trick for the club.
- Chelsea 0–1 QPR (2 January 2013) – QPR secured their first win at Stamford Bridge since March 1979 thanks to a 78th-minute winner from Shaun Wright-Phillips. Chelsea went into the game in fourth place after a four-match winning run, while QPR where bottom with just 10 points from 20 games, eight points from safety and without an away win in the league since November 2011.
- Brentford 2–2 Chelsea (27 January 2013) – In the first game between Chelsea and Brentford since 1950, Brentford shocked Chelsea in an FA Cup tie at Griffin Park, twice going ahead through goals from Marcello Trotta and Harry Forrester. Oscar, however, first levelled before Fernando Torres secured a replay at Stamford Bridge with an equaliser seven minutes from time. Chelsea won the replay 4–0.
- Brentford 0–1 Fulham (26 August 2014) – In the first game between Fulham and Brentford since 1998, Fulham's under-pressure manager Felix Magath secured a win in the League Cup. The only goal of the game came from Ross McCormack.
- Fulham 0–2 Brentford (20 June 2020) – In the first Championship game after the break in the season due to the COVID-19 pandemic, Brentford scored two late goals to move within a point of Fulham, starting a long winning run. The two teams finished level on points and battled for promotion at Wembley.
- Brentford 1–2 Fulham (aet) (4 August 2020) – An empty Wembley Stadium hosted the Championship Play-Off Final. Fulham won promotion to the Premier League for the 2020-21 season. All the goals came from extra time: first two from Fulham, both from Joe Bryan, before Brentford scored a consolation through Henrik Dalsgaard.
- Chelsea 1–4 Brentford (2 April 2022) – In the third match between the clubs in the 2021−22 season, with the previous two being Chelsea victories, Brentford pulled off a shocking victory at Stamford Bridge. After an uneventful first half, Chelsea's centre-back Antonio Rüdiger opened the scoring with a stunning strike from distance. Brentford responded with four unanswered goals by Vitaly Janelt (2), Christian Eriksen and Yoane Wissa. It was Brentford’s first win against Chelsea since 1939.
- Fulham 3–2 Brentford (20 August 2022) – Fulham met Brentford in the top flight of English football for the first time. Fulham's Bobby Decordova-Reid scoring after just 44 seconds and they doubled their lead after 20 minutes through a Joao Palhinha header from a corner. Brentford pegged Fulham back with a Christian Norgaard volley from a corner two minutes before half time. after having two goals disallowed, Ivan Toney equalised for Brentford after 71 minutes, but Aleksandar Mitrovic scored a 90th minute winner with a header at the back post. This was Fulham's first win in a top flight London derby for 25 matches, since they beat West Ham United at Craven Cottage in 2014.
- Fulham 2–1 Chelsea (12 January 2023) – This was the first time that Fulham had beaten Chelsea since 2006. Former Chelsea player Willian opened the scoring in the 25th minute, before Kalidou Koulibaly scored an equaliser at the start of the second half. In the 73rd minute Carlos Vinícius scored the winner for the home side.
- Fulham 3–2 Brentford (18 May 2025) – Fulham secured a thrilling comeback victory at the Gtech Community Stadium in a high-stakes, late-season battle for European qualification. The hosts fought back from a Raúl Jiménez opener to lead 2–1 at halftime through Bryan Mbeumo and Yoane Wissa. However, a brilliant second-half tactical shuffle by Marco Silva turned the match on its head. Substitute Tom Cairney leveled the scoring late on, before fellow substitute Harry Wilson nodded home an 87th-minute winner to take all three points on enemy turf.

== Crossing the divide ==
A list of players who have played for or managed at least two out of Brentford, Chelsea, Fulham and QPR.

=== Brentford, Chelsea and Fulham ===
- Jimmy Bowie – first Chelsea, then Fulham, then Brentford and later returned to Fulham.
- Peter Buchanan – first Chelsea, then Fulham, then Brentford.
- Ron Greenwood – first Brentford, then Chelsea, then Fulham.
- Barry Lloyd – first Chelsea, then Fulham, then Brentford.
- Gerry Peyton – first Fulham, then played for Brentford and Chelsea on loan from Everton. Signed permanently for Brentford after leaving Everton.
- Steve Sidwell – first Brentford, then Chelsea, then Fulham.
- Billy Sperrin – guested for Fulham and Chelsea during the Second World War, then signed permanently for Brentford in 1949.

=== Brentford and Chelsea ===
- Joe Allon – first Chelsea, then Brentford.
- George Anderson – first Brentford, then Chelsea.
- Micky Block – first Chelsea, then Brentford.
- Johnny Brooks – first Chelsea, then Brentford.
- Neil Clement – loaned to Brentford.
- Jack Cock – first Brentford, then Chelsea.
- Nick Colgan – loaned to Brentford.
- Alan Dickens – loaned to Brentford.
- Micky Droy – first Chelsea, then Brentford.
- Lee Frost – loaned to Brentford and signed permanently two years later.
- Bill Garner – first Chelsea, then Brentford.
- Gareth Hall – first Chelsea, then Brentford.
- Ron Harris – first Chelsea, then Brentford. Was also assistant manager at Brentford.
- Jordan Henderson - first Brentford, then Chelsea
- Stewart Houston – first Chelsea, then Brentford.
- Iori Jenkins – first Chelsea, then Brentford.
- Gary Johnson – first Chelsea, then Brentford.
- Keith Jones – first Chelsea, then Brentford.
- Roger Joseph – first Brentford, then Chelsea.
- Joe Keenan – loaned to Brentford.
- Joel Kitamirike – loaned to Brentford.
- Keith Lawrence – first Chelsea, then Brentford.
- Tommy Lawton – first Chelsea, then Brentford.
- Colin Lee – first Chelsea, then Brentford.
- Bill Livingstone – first Chelsea, then Brentford.
- Michael Maskell – first Chelsea, then Brentford.
- Josh McEachran – first Chelsea, then Brentford
- Andy Myers – first Chelsea, then Brentford.
- Alan Nelmes – first Chelsea, then Brentford.
- Eric Parsons – first Chelsea, then Brentford.
- Johnny Paton – first Chelsea, then Brentford.
- Adrian Pettigrew – loaned to Brentford.
- Philip Priest – loaned to Brentford.
- Graham Rix – loaned to Brentford by Arsenal, signed permanently for Chelsea.
- George Saville – loaned to Brentford.
- Mel Scott – first Chelsea, then Brentford.
- Fred Taylor – first Chelsea, then Brentford.
- Sid Tickridge – first Chelsea, then Brentford.
- Sam Tillen – first Chelsea, then Brentford.
- Brian Turner – first Chelsea, then Brentford.
- Graham Wilkins – first Chelsea, then Brentford.
- Stephen Wilkins – first Chelsea, then Brentford.

=== Brentford and Fulham ===
- Ralph Allen – first Fulham, then Brentford.
- George Bertram – first Fulham, then Brentford.
- Paul Brooker – first Fulham, then Brentford.
- Wayne Brown – loaned to Brentford.
- David Button – first Brentford, then Fulham
- Dave Carlton – first Fulham, then Brentford.
- Danny Cullip – first Fulham, then Brentford.
- Bill Dodgin, Jr. – played for and managed Fulham, then managed Brentford.
- Maurice Edelston – first Fulham, then Brentford.
- Harry Fletcher – first Fulham, then Brentford.
- John Fraser – first for Fulham, then Brentford.
- Darren Freeman – first for Fulham, then Brentford.
- Tom Garnish – first Brentford, then Fulham.
- Leonard Geard – first Fulham, then Brentford.
- Ellis Green – first Brentford, then Fulham.
- Tom Garnish – first Brentford, then Fulham.
- Kelly Haag – first Brentford, then Fulham.
- Jimmy Hill – first Brentford, then Fulham.
- Gus Hurdle – first Fulham, then Brentford.
- Terry Hurlock – first Brentford, then Fulham.
- Francis Joseph – first Brentford, then Fulham.
- Junior Lewis – first a schoolboy at Brentford, then Fulham and back to Brentford.
- Archie Macaulay – first Brentford, then Fulham.
- Tony Mahoney – first Fulham, then Brentford.
- John McCourt – first Brentford, then Fulham.
- Robert Milsom – loaned to Brentford.
- Frank Morrad – first Fulham, then Brentford.
- Abe Morris – first Fulham, then Brentford.
- Bernard Newcombe – first Fulham, then Brentford.
- Fred Nidd – first Brentford, then Fulham.
- Trevor Porter – first Fulham, then Brentford.
- Darren Pratley – loaned to Brentford twice.
- Johnny Price – first Brentford, then Fulham.
- Paul Priddy – first Fulham, then three spells with Brentford.
- Dennis Rampling – first Fulham, then Brentford.
- Bertie Rosier – first Brentford, then Fulham.
- John Richardson – first Brentford, then Fulham.
- Joe Ryalls – first Fulham, then Brentford.
- John Salako – first Fulham, then Brentford.
- Steve Scrivens – loaned to Brentford.
- Paul Shrubb – first Fulham, then Brentford.
- John South – first Fulham, then Brentford.
- Les Strong – loaned to Brentford.
- Jeff Taylor – first Fulham, then Brentford.
- Bob Thomas – first Brentford, then Fulham.
- Marcello Trotta – loaned to Brentford twice.
- Ernie Watkins – first Brentford, then Fulham.
- Paul Watson – first Fulham, then Brentford.
- Tom Wilson – first Fulham, then Brentford.
- Alexander Wood – first Brentford, then Fulham.
- Viv Woodward – first Fulham, then Brentford.

=== Brentford and QPR ===
- Martin Allen – played for QPR, managed Brentford.
- Herbert Ashford – first Brentford, then QPR. Born in Fulham.
- Yoann Barbet – first Brentford, then QPR.
- Jake Bidwell – first Brentford, then QPR.
- Marcus Bean – first QPR, then Brentford.
- James Bellingham – first QPR, then Brentford.
- Graham Benstead – first QPR, then Brentford.
- Stan Bowles - first QPR, then Brentford.
- George Bristow – first Brentford, then QPR.
- Nikki Bull – first QPR, then Brentford.
- Steve Burke – loaned to Brentford.
- Jackie Burns – first QPR, then Brentford.
- Tommy Cain – first QPR, then Brentford.
- DJ Campbell – first Brentford, then QPR.
- Tommy Cheetham – first for Brentford, then QPR.
- Gary Cooper – loaned to Brentford.
- Willie Cross – first QPR, then Brentford.
- John Docherty – first Brentford, then QPR.
- Fred Durrant – first Brentford, then QPR.
- Jack Durston – first QPR, then Brentford.
- Lloyd Evans – first QPR, then Brentford.
- Dave Ewing – first Brentford, then QPR.
- Les Ferdinand – loaned to Brentford.
- Mark Fleming – first QPR, then Brentford.
- George Francis – first for Brentford, then QPR and back to Brentford.
- Allan Glover – first QPR, loaned to Brentford by West Bromwich Albion, then signed permanently two years later.
- Patsy Hendren – first for QPR, then two spells with Brentford.
- Ian Holloway – first Brentford, then QPR. Later managed QPR.
- Mark Hill – first QPR, then Brentford.
- Bill Keech – first QPR, then Brentford.
- Jim Langley – first Brentford, then QPR.
- Mark Lazarus – two spells at QPR, on to Brentford and back to QPR.
- Billy McAdams – first Brentford, then QPR.
- Andrew McCulloch – first for QPR, then Brentford.
- Tom McGovern – first Brentford, then QPR.
- George McLeod – first Brentford, then QPR.
- Thomas McKenzie – first Brentford, then QPR.
- Archie Mitchell – first QPR, then Brentford.
- Sam Morris – first QPR, then Brentford.
- Denny Mundee – first QPR, then Brentford.
- Richard Pacquette – first QPR, then Brentford.
- John Pearson – first for Brentford, then QPR.
- Edward Price – first Brentford, then QPR.
- Bill Pointon – first QPR, then Brentford.
- Keith Pritchett – first QPR, then Brentford.
- Martin Rowlands – first Brentford, then QPR, later QPR captain.
- Harry Salt – first QPR, then Brentford.
- Kenny Sansom – first QPR, then Brentford.
- Thomas Shufflebotham – first Brentford, then QPR.
- Barry Silkman – first Brentford, then QPR.
- Henry Simons – first Brentford, then QPR.
- Andy Sinton – first Brentford, then QPR.
- Steve Slade – loaned to Brentford.
- George Smith – first for Brentford, then QPR.
- Ian Stewart – first for QPR, then loaned to Brentford from Portsmouth.
- George Stewart – first for Brentford, then QPR.
- Nigel Smith – first for QPR, then Brentford.
- Sidney Sugden – first QPR, then Brentford.
- Gordon Sweetzer – first QPR, then two spells with Brentford.
- Steven Tom – first QPR, then Brentford.
- Jim Towers – first for Brentford, then QPR.
- Rowan Vine – loaned to Brentford from Portsmouth, then signed permanently for QPR. Loaned to Brentford by QPR.
- Mark Warburton – first managed Brentford, then managed QPR.
- Billy Yenson – first QPR, then Brentford.
- Bert Young – first for Brentford, then QPR.

=== Chelsea, Fulham and QPR ===
- Roy Bentley – won the league title as a striker with Chelsea in 1955 and moved on to Fulham a year later, where he was converted into a defender. Upon leaving Fulham, Bentley spent two years with QPR.
- Bobby Campbell – managed Fulham between 1976 and 1980, and later Chelsea between 1988 and 1991. Also coached QPR in the 1980s.
- Paul Parker – started his career at Fulham before being sold to QPR (where we went on to start for England in the 1990 World Cup) also played four games for Chelsea in 1997.
- Dave Sexton – having been a coach at Fulham during the 1960s, Sexton managed Chelsea and QPR during the 1970s. He won the FA Cup and European Cup Winners' Cup in successive seasons with Chelsea and took Rangers to within a point of the league title; as such he is regarded by both clubs as one of their greatest ever managers.
- Clive Walker – winger who played for all three West London clubs.
- Ray Wilkins – started his playing career at Chelsea, and later played for and managed QPR as well as managing Fulham. He also had a stint as assistant manager to Gianluca Vialli at Chelsea. He again became the assistant manager under Luiz Felipe Scolari after the departure of Steve Clarke. He continued to perform the role under Guus Hiddink and Carlo Ancelotti until his contract was terminated without notice on 11 November 2010. He also had a stint as assistant head coach to René Meulensteen at Fulham, but was sacked after less than two months in the role along with Meulensteen and Alan Curbishley.

=== Chelsea and Fulham ===
- Tosin Adarabioyo - first at Fulham, then Chelsea.
- Dave Beasant – after leaving Chelsea in 1992, Beasant played for a further 10 clubs before ending up as a reserve goalkeeper/coach at Fulham in 2003. He retired from his playing capacity a year later without actually playing a game, and is still employed by the club as a coach.
- Marcus Bettinelli – first at Fulham, then Chelsea.
- Wayne Bridge – was on loan at Fulham from Chelsea during the second half of the 2005–06 season.
- Armando Broja – played for Chelsea since 2020, was on loan at Fulham during the second half of 2023–24 season.
- Gordon Davies – first at Fulham, then Chelsea.
- John Dempsey – first at Fulham, then Chelsea.
- Slaviša Jokanović - first at Chelsea, then managed Fulham
- Damien Duff – first at Chelsea, Newcastle (see article Tyne–Wear derby), then Fulham (formerly with Blackburn Rovers)
- Bjarne Goldbæk – first at Chelsea, then Fulham.
- Eiður Guðjohnsen – first at Chelsea, then Fulham.
- Jon Harley – first at Chelsea, then Fulham.
- Gaël Kakuta – was on loan at Fulham from Chelsea during the second half of the 2010–11 season.
- Ray Lewington – first at Chelsea, then Fulham.
- Ruben Loftus-Cheek – played for Chelsea since 2014, was on loan at Fulham during 2020–21 season.
- Scott Parker - first at Chelsea, then Fulham. Former Fulham manager.
- Ian Pearce – first at Chelsea, then Fulham, via Blackburn Rovers and West Ham.
- Lucas Piazón – was on loan at Fulham from Chelsea during the 2016–17 and 2017–18 seasons.
- Robert Savage – first at Fulham, then Chelsea. Not to be confused with modern-day player Robbie Savage.
- André Schürrle – first at Chelsea, then Fulham on loan.
- Mark Schwarzer – first at Fulham, then Chelsea.
- Jimmy Sharp – two spells with Fulham, then Chelsea, then back to Fulham.
- Alexey Smertin – signed with Fulham in early 2007, having played for (among other Premiership clubs) Chelsea.
- Willian – first at Chelsea, then Fulham.

=== Chelsea and QPR ===
- Clive Allen – first QPR, then Chelsea.
- Asmir Begović- played for Chelsea between 2015–17. Joined QPR in 2023.
- José Bosingwa – played for Chelsea then moved to QPR.
- Barry Bridges – Chelsea to QPR via Birmingham City.
- Gary Chivers – Chelsea to QPR via Swansea City.
- Jake Clarke-Salter – Chelsea to QPR.
- Tommy Docherty – managed Chelsea in the 1960s. Two spells as QPR manager.
- Rhys Evans – loaned from Chelsea to QPR.
- Mark Falco – on loan to Chelsea and later had a spell with QPR.
- Mike Fillery – from Chelsea to QPR.
- Paul Furlong – from Chelsea to QPR.
- Allan Harris – from Chelsea to QPR.
- John Hollins – played and managed both clubs.
- Tommy Langley – from Chelsea to QPR.
- Michael Mancienne – spent two loan spells at QPR.
- Gavin Peacock – played for Chelsea in the 1990s, either side of spells at QPR.
- Loïc Rémy – signed by QPR in January 2013, bought by Chelsea in August 2014.
- Ben Sahar – came to QPR on loan from Chelsea.
- Scott Sinclair – came on loan to QPR from Chelsea.
- Jimmy Smith – came on loan to QPR from Chelsea.
- Nigel Spackman – Chelsea then QPR via Liverpool.
- John Spencer – Chelsea to QPR.
- William Steer – first QPR, then Chelsea.
- Terry Venables – player at Chelsea then transferred to QPR via Tottenham Hotspur in 1969. Managed QPR in the 1980s.
- Ian Watson – moved from Chelsea to QPR in the mid-1960s.
- David Webb – from Chelsea to QPR. Managed Chelsea in 1993.
- Roy Wegerle – from Chelsea to QPR via loan to Swindon Town and permanent move to Luton Town.
- Steve Wicks – from Chelsea to QPR via Derby County. Later returned to QPR after a spell at Crystal Palace.
- Shaun Wright-Phillips – from Chelsea to QPR via Manchester City.

=== Fulham, QPR and Brentford ===
- Dave Metchick – first Fulham, then QPR, then Brentford.
- David Nelson – Fulham, Brentford, QPR.
- Tony Parks – First Brentford, loaned to QPR and then signed for Fulham
- Calum Willock – Loaned from Fulham to QPR, later signed for Brentford in 2006.

=== Fulham and QPR ===
- Dean Coney – Fulham and QPR striker. Part of the deal that took Paul Parker to QPR.
- Lee Cook – QPR winger transferred to Fulham 2007/8 season.
- Joe Fidler – First Fulham, then QPR.
- Rodney Marsh – Started off at Fulham, before becoming a QPR legend and then moved to Manchester City before coming back to play for the maverick Fulham side, and England. Returned to Fulham for a brief loan spell in 1976.
- Stefan Johansen – loaned to QPR from Fulham in 2020–21.
- Andrew Johnson – Fulham to QPR in 2012.
- Stephen Kelly – played for QPR in 2003. Joined Fulham in 2009.
- Thomas Leigh – First Fulham, then QPR.
- Heiðar Helguson – Fulham and QPR striker.
- Mark Hughes – Managed Fulham in the 2010/11 season before leaving due to a desire to win trophies. Signed as QPR manager the following season in January.
- Paul Parker – Played over 100 games for both clubs.
- Zesh Rehman – Moved from Fulham to QPR in 2006.
- Tony Sealy – Small but quick striker. Top scorer as QPR won promotion in 1982/83. Later moved to Fulham.
- Matt Smith – First Fulham, then QPR
- Ernie Symes – First Fulham, then QPR.
- Adel Taarabt – Loaned from QPR to Fulham in 2013
- Bobby Zamora – Played for Fulham until signing for QPR on a January transfer in 2012.

== See also ==
- London derbies
- South London derby
- North London derby
- East London derby
- Local derby
- Sports rivalry
- Local derbies in the United Kingdom
