= 1981–82 Brentford F.C. season =

English football team season

Brentford
1981–82 season
- Chairman: Dan Tana (until September 1981); Martin Lange (from September 1981)
- Manager: Fred Callaghan
- Stadium: Griffin Park
- Third Division: 8th
- FA Cup: Second round
- League Cup: First round
- Top goalscorer: League: Bowen, G. Johnson, Roberts (8); All: Bowen (10)
- Highest home attendance: 10,834
- Lowest home attendance: 4,124
- Average home league attendance: 5,692
| Home colours | Away colours |

During the 1981–82 English football season, Brentford competed in the Football League Third Division. After losing ground in January and February 1982, just one win from the final five matches of the season ended the Bees' hopes of promotion.

== Season summary ==
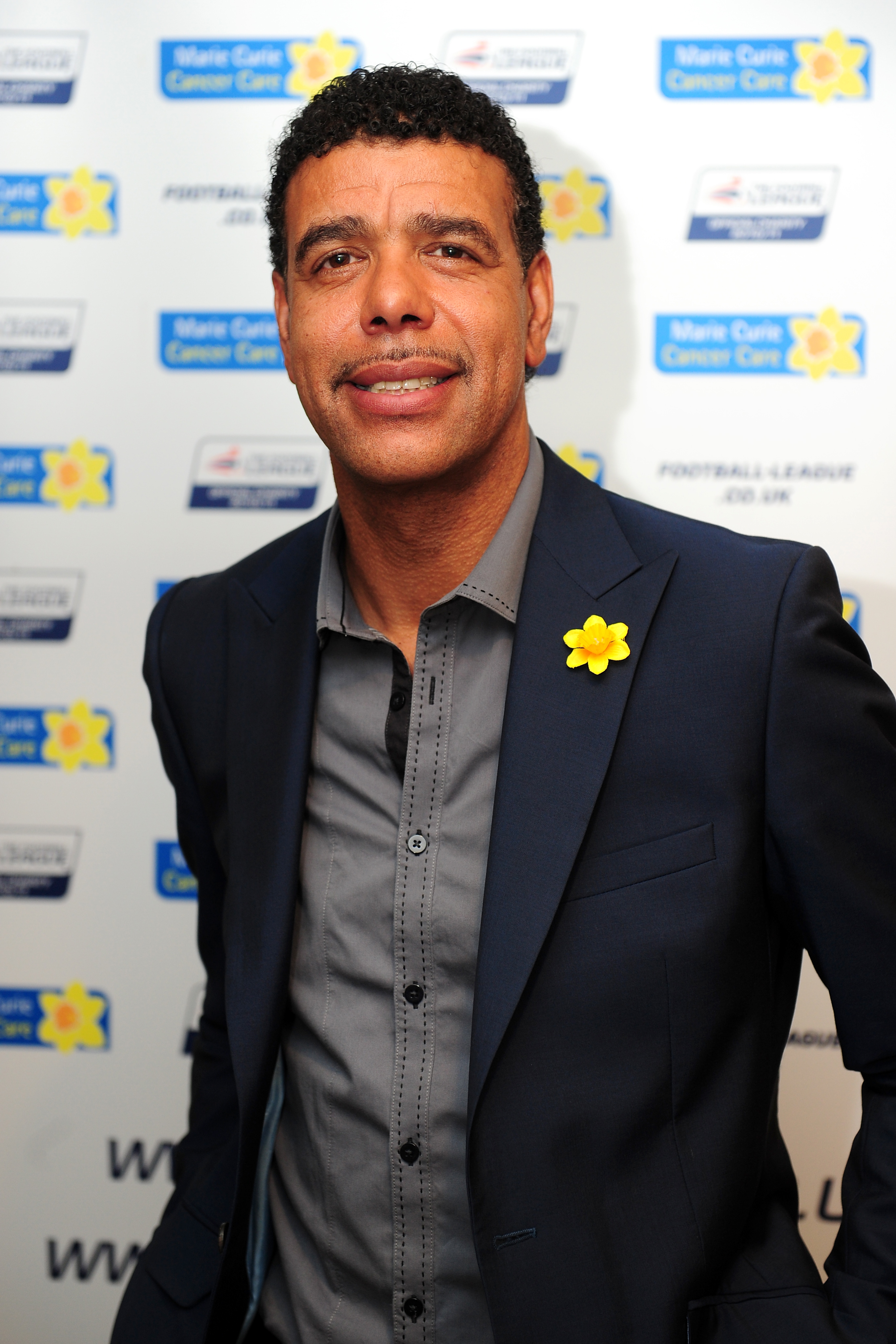
Midfielder Chris Kamara was signed from Portsmouth in an exchange deal in October 1981 and was named captain of Brentford in March 1982.

Aside from the club record signing of £65,000 central defender Alan Whitehead, Brentford manager Fred Callaghan presided over a quiet 1981 off-season at Griffin Park. Goalkeeper Paul Priddy returned to the club for a third spell on a part-time contract as cover for David McKellar, but the club went into the season understaffed in the striking department, having lost Gary Johnson to injury in a car crash and a suitable replacement could not be found in time. Bids for midfielders John Beck, Jeff Chandler, forward David Kemp and former Brentford player Andrew McCulloch had failed to yield any transfers.

Despite going unbeaten in the first four Third Division matches of the season, a bad run of results in September and October 1981 dropped the club to just above the relegation places. Manager Callaghan acted swiftly in the transfer market, signing midfielders Stan Bowles, Chris Kamara and finally bolstering the forward line with the acquisition of Keith Bowen. The upturn in form was immediate and seven wins and one draw from a 10-match spell lifted the Bees from 18th place on 17 October to 4th on 28 December. The run included five consecutive away league wins, which equalled the club record.

Brentford began 1982 with a run in which the team took just two points from a possible 24, which dropped the club back into mid-table. Former player Gordon Sweetzer briefly returned to Griffin Park in January, but scored just one goal in 9 appearances before returning to his native Canada. The team recovered in March and things further improved after forward David Kemp was finally signed on loan in March, but he succumbed to injury after just three appearances. A 2–1 win over Chester on 24 April put the Bees in 7th position, four points behind 3rd-place Lincoln City with five matches to play. Brentford's outside chances of promotion were killed off in the following match versus Wimbledon at Griffin Park, losing 3–2, having been leading 2–0. The Bees finished the season in 8th position.

== League table ==
| Pos | Team | Pld | W | D | L | GF | GA | GD | Pts |
|---|---|---|---|---|---|---|---|---|---|
| 6 | Gillingham | 46 | 20 | 11 | 15 | 64 | 56 | +8 | 71 |
| 7 | Southend United | 46 | 18 | 15 | 13 | 63 | 51 | +12 | 69 |
| 8 | Brentford | 46 | 19 | 11 | 16 | 56 | 47 | +9 | 68 |
| 9 | Millwall | 46 | 18 | 13 | 15 | 62 | 62 | 0 | 67 |
| 10 | Plymouth Argyle | 46 | 18 | 11 | 17 | 64 | 56 | +8 | 65 |

Source: rsssf.com (incorrect), source=11v11.com

== Results ==
Brentford's goal tally listed first.

=== Legend ===
| Win | Draw | Loss |

=== Pre-season and friendlies ===
| Date | Opponent | Venue | Result | Attendance | Scorer(s) |
|---|---|---|---|---|---|
| 5 August 1981 | Wembley | A | 5–0 | n/a | Crown, Walker, Booker, Rowe, B. Bowen |
| 8 August 1981 | Hillingdon Borough | A | 2–0 | n/a | Booker, Roberts |
| 11 August 1981 | Woking | A | 3–0 | n/a | Tonge (2), Roberts |
| 15 August 1981 | Cambridge United | H | 5–0 | 1,195 | Crown (3), Whitehead, Booker |
| 18 August 1981 | Brighton & Hove Albion | H | 1–3 | n/a | Booker |
| 12 October 1981 | San Jose Earthquakes | H | 8–2 | 3,970 | Roberts (3), K. Bowen (3), G. Johnson, Booker |
| 10 May 1982 | Watford | H | 1–2 | 2,098 | Roberts |

=== Football League Third Division ===
| No. | Date | Opponent | Venue | Result | Attendance | Scorer(s) |
|---|---|---|---|---|---|---|
| 1 | 29 August 1981 | Fulham | A | 2–1 | 7,632 | Tucker (pen), Brown (og) |
| 2 | 5 September 1981 | Walsall | H | 0–0 | 5,353 | |
| 3 | 12 September 1981 | Portsmouth | A | 2–2 | 10,364 | Crown, Booker |
| 4 | 19 September 1981 | Plymouth Argyle | H | 0–0 | 4,943 | |
| 5 | 21 September 1981 | Gillingham | H | 0–1 | 5,425 | |
| 6 | 26 September 1981 | Doncaster Rovers | A | 0–1 | 5,494 | |
| 7 | 29 September 1981 | Newport County | A | 1–0 | 4,040 | Tucker |
| 8 | 3 October 1981 | Carlisle United | H | 1–2 | 4,587 | G. Johnson |
| 9 | 10 October 1981 | Exeter City | A | 1–3 | 3,589 | Crown |
| 10 | 17 October 1981 | Lincoln City | H | 3–1 | 4,187 | Booker, Whitehead, Tucker |
| 11 | 19 October 1981 | Southend United | H | 0–1 | 5,043 | |
| 12 | 24 October 1981 | Chesterfield | A | 2–0 | 5,525 | K. Bowen, Roberts |
| 13 | 31 October 1981 | Burnley | H | 0–0 | 6,929 | |
| 14 | 3 November 1981 | Swindon Town | A | 3–0 | 6,649 | G. Johnson, K. Bowen, Kamara |
| 15 | 7 November 1981 | Bristol City | H | 0–1 | 6,758 | |
| 16 | 14 November 1981 | Oxford United | A | 2–1 | 5,693 | G. Johnson (2) |
| 17 | 28 November 1981 | Chester | H | 1–0 | 5,201 | McNichol |
| 18 | 5 December 1981 | Preston North End | A | 3–1 | 4,171 | K. Bowen (2), G. Johnson |
| 19 | 28 December 1981 | Millwall | A | 1–0 | 7,474 | Roberts |
| 20 | 2 January 1982 | Huddersfield Town | H | 0–1 | 5,438 | |
| 21 | 19 January 1982 | Walsall | A | 0–3 | 3,853 | |
| 22 | 23 January 1982 | Fulham | H | 0–1 | 10,834 | |
| 23 | 27 January 1982 | Reading | A | 1–4 | 3,710 | Sweetzer |
| 24 | 30 January 1982 | Plymouth Argyle | A | 0–1 | 5,008 | |
| 25 | 6 February 1982 | Portsmouth | H | 2–2 | 5,947 | Tucker (pen), Bowles |
| 26 | 9 February 1982 | Gillingham | A | 1–1 | 3,931 | Bowles |
| 27 | 13 February 1982 | Carlisle United | A | 0–1 | 4,942 | |
| 28 | 20 February 1982 | Newport County | H | 2–0 | 4,297 | Roberts, Kamara |
| 29 | 27 February 1982 | Exeter City | H | 2–0 | 4,934 | Whitehead, K. Bowen |
| 30 | 6 March 1982 | Lincoln City | A | 0–1 | 2,880 | |
| 31 | 8 March 1982 | Southend United | A | 1–1 | 4,058 | Kemp |
| 32 | 13 March 1982 | Chesterfield | H | 2–0 | 5,374 | Roberts, Kamara |
| 33 | 20 March 1982 | Burnley | A | 0–0 | 7,906 | |
| 34 | 22 March 1982 | Bristol Rovers | H | 1–0 | 5,840 | Bowles (pen) |
| 35 | 27 March 1982 | Bristol City | A | 1–0 | 6,243 | K. Bowen |
| 36 | 3 April 1982 | Oxford United | H | 1–2 | 5,786 | Booker |
| 37 | 9 April 1982 | Millwall | H | 4–1 | 7,460 | G. Johnson, Booker, McNichol, Roberts |
| 38 | 12 April 1982 | Wimbledon | A | 2–1 | 4,513 | Hurlock, Roberts |
| 39 | 17 April 1982 | Preston North End | H | 0–0 | 5,627 | |
| 40 | 19 April 1982 | Swindon Town | H | 4–2 | 5,374 | Hurlock, K. Bowen, Bowles, McNichol |
| 41 | 24 April 1982 | Chester | A | 2–1 | 1,484 | Kamara, G. Johnson |
| 42 | 26 April 1982 | Wimbledon | H | 2–3 | 6,612 | Bowles, G. Johnson |
| 43 | 1 May 1982 | Doncaster Rovers | H | 2–2 | 4,124 | K. Bowen, Whitehead |
| 44 | 3 May 1982 | Bristol Rovers | A | 2–1 | 4,314 | Roberts, Kamara |
| 45 | 8 May 1982 | Huddersfield Town | A | 1–1 | 4,542 | Bowles (pen) |
| 46 | 15 May 1982 | Reading | H | 1–2 | 4,502 | Roberts |

=== FA Cup ===
| Round | Date | Opponent | Venue | Result | Attendance | Scorer(s) |
|---|---|---|---|---|---|---|
| 1R | 21 November 1981 | Exeter City | H | 2–0 | 6,416 | K. Bowen (2) |
| 2R | 16 December 1981 | Colchester United | H | 1–1 | 5,448 | Roberts |
| 2R (replay) | 30 December 1981 | Colchester United | A | 0–1 | 5,532 | |

=== Football League Cup ===
| Round | Date | Opponent | Venue | Result | Attendance |
|---|---|---|---|---|---|
| 1R (1st leg) | 2 September 1981 | Oxford United | A | 0–1 | 3,621 |
| 1R (2nd leg) | 15 September 1981 | Oxford United | H | 0–2 (lost 3–0 on aggregate) | 5,490 |

- Sources: 100 Years of Brentford, The Big Brentford Book of the Eighties, Statto

== Playing squad ==
Players' ages are as of the opening day of the 1981–82 season.

| Pos. | Name | Nat. | Date of birth (age) | Signed from | Signed in | Notes |
Goalkeepers
| GK | David McKellar | (Scotland) | 22 May 1956 (aged 25) | Derby County | 1980 | |
| GK | Paul Priddy | (England) | 11 July 1953 (aged 28) | Hayes | 1981 | |
Defenders
| DF | Mark Hill | (England) | 21 January 1961 (aged 20) | Queens Park Rangers | 1980 | |
| DF | Robbie Johnson | (England) | 30 March 1962 (aged 19) | Arsenal | 1981 | |
| DF | Jim McNichol | (Scotland) | 9 June 1958 (aged 23) | Luton Town | 1978 | |
| DF | Terry Rowe | (England) | 8 June 1964 (aged 17) | Youth | 1982 | |
| DF | Danis Salman | (England) | 12 March 1960 (aged 21) | Youth | 1975 | |
| DF | Tony Spencer | (England) | 23 April 1965 (aged 16) | Youth | 1982 | |
| DF | Barry Tucker | (Wales) | 28 August 1952 (aged 29) | Northampton Town | 1978 | |
| DF | Alan Whitehead | (England) | 20 November 1956 (aged 24) | Bury | 1981 | |
Midfielders
| MF | Stan Bowles | (England) | 24 December 1948 (aged 32) | Orient | 1981 | |
| MF | Ron Harris | (England) | 13 November 1944 (aged 36) | Chelsea | 1980 | Assistant manager |
| MF | Terry Hurlock | (England) | 22 November 1958 (aged 22) | Leytonstone/Ilford | 1980 | |
| MF | Chris Kamara (c) | (England) | 25 December 1957 (aged 23) | Portsmouth | 1981 | |
| MF | Gary Roberts | (Wales) | 5 April 1960 (aged 21) | Wembley | 1980 | |
| MF | Paul Shrubb | (England) | 1 August 1955 (aged 26) | Hellenic | 1977 | |
| MF | Keith Tonge | (England) | 6 November 1964 (aged 16) | Youth | 1982 | |
| MF | Paul Walker | (England) | 17 December 1960 (aged 20) | Youth | 1976 | |
Forwards
| FW | Bob Booker | (England) | 25 January 1958 (aged 23) | Bedmond Sports & Social | 1978 | |
| FW | Keith Bowen | (Wales) | 26 February 1958 (aged 23) | Northampton Town | 1981 | |
| FW | Gary Johnson | (England) | 14 September 1959 (aged 21) | Chelsea | 1980 | |
Players who left the club mid-season
| DF | Pat Kruse | (England) | 30 November 1953 (aged 27) | Torquay United | 1977 | Loaned to Northampton Town, released |
| MF | David Crown | (England) | 16 February 1958 (aged 23) | Walthamstow Avenue | 1980 | Transferred to Portsmouth |
| FW | David Kemp | (England) | 20 February 1953 (aged 28) | Plymouth Argyle | 1982 | Returned to Plymouth Argyle after loan |
| FW | Gordon Sweetzer | (Canada) | 27 January 1957 (aged 24) | Toronto Blizzard | 1982 | Released |

- Sources: The Big Brentford Book of the Eighties, Timeless Bees

== Coaching staff ==
| Name | Role |
|---|---|
| (England) Fred Callaghan | Manager |
| (England) Ron Harris | Assistant manager |
| (England) Eddie Lyons | Physiotherapist |

== Statistics ==
=== Appearances and goals ===
Substitute appearances in brackets.

| Pos | Nat | Name | League | | FA Cup | | League Cup | | Total | |
| Pos | Nat | Name | Apps | Goals | Apps | Goals | Apps | Goals | Apps | Goals |
|---|---|---|---|---|---|---|---|---|---|---|
| GK | (Scotland) | David McKellar | 45 | 0 | 3 | 0 | 2 | 0 | 50 | 0 |
| GK | (England) | Paul Priddy | 1 | 0 | 0 | 0 | 0 | 0 | 1 | 0 |
| DF | (England) | Mark Hill | 17 (1) | 0 | 0 | 0 | 2 | 0 | 19 (1) | 0 |
| DF | (England) | Robbie Johnson | 1 | 0 | 0 | 0 | 0 | 0 | 1 | 0 |
| DF | (England) | Pat Kruse | 1 | 0 | 0 | 0 | 0 | 0 | 1 | 0 |
| DF | (Scotland) | Jim McNichol | 26 | 3 | 3 | 0 | 0 | 0 | 29 | 3 |
| DF | (England) | Terry Rowe | 10 | 0 | 0 | 0 | 0 | 0 | 10 | 0 |
| DF | (England) | Danis Salman | 40 | 0 | 2 | 0 | 2 | 0 | 44 | 0 |
| DF | (England) | Tony Spencer | 3 | 0 | — | | — | | 3 | 0 |
| DF | (Wales) | Barry Tucker | 38 | 4 | 3 | 0 | 2 | 0 | 43 | 4 |
| DF | (England) | Alan Whitehead | 42 (1) | 3 | 3 | 0 | 2 | 0 | 47 (1) | 3 |
| MF | (England) | Stan Bowles | 31 | 6 | 2 | 0 | — | | 33 | 6 |
| MF | (England) | David Crown | 7 (1) | 2 | — | | 2 | 0 | 9 (1) | 2 |
| MF | (England) | Ron Harris | 19 (1) | 0 | 1 | 0 | 2 | 0 | 22 (1) | 0 |
| MF | (England) | Terry Hurlock | 40 | 2 | 3 | 0 | 2 | 0 | 45 | 2 |
| MF | (England) | Chris Kamara | 31 | 5 | 3 | 0 | — | | 34 | 5 |
| MF | (Wales) | Gary Roberts | 39 (1) | 8 | 2 | 1 | 2 | 0 | 43 (1) | 9 |
| MF | (England) | Paul Shrubb | 4 | 0 | 0 | 0 | 1 | 0 | 5 | 0 |
| MF | (England) | Keith Tonge | 0 (1) | 0 | 0 | 0 | 0 | 0 | 0 (1) | 0 |
| MF | (England) | Paul Walker | 7 (2) | 0 | 0 | 0 | 1 | 0 | 8 (2) | 0 |
| FW | (England) | Bob Booker | 27 (11) | 4 | 2 | 0 | 2 | 0 | 31 (11) | 4 |
| FW | (Wales) | Keith Bowen | 37 (1) | 8 | 3 | 2 | — | | 40 (1) | 10 |
| FW | (England) | Gary Johnson | 29 (1) | 8 | 3 | 0 | 0 | 0 | 32 (1) | 8 |
| FW | (Canada) | Gordon Sweetzer | 8 (1) | 1 | — | | — | | 8 (1) | 1 |
Players loaned in during the season
| FW | (England) | David Kemp | 3 | 1 | — | | — | | 3 | 1 |

- Players listed in italics left the club mid-season.
- Source: The Big Brentford Book of the Eighties

=== Goalscorers ===
| Pos. | Nat | Player | FL3 | FAC | FLC | Total |
|---|---|---|---|---|---|---|
| FW | (Wales) | Keith Bowen | 8 | 2 | — | 10 |
| MF | (Wales) | Gary Roberts | 8 | 1 | 0 | 9 |
| FW | (England) | Gary Johnson | 8 | 0 | 0 | 8 |
| MF | (England) | Stan Bowles | 6 | 0 | — | 6 |
| MF | (England) | Chris Kamara | 5 | 0 | — | 5 |
| FW | (England) | Bob Booker | 4 | 0 | 0 | 4 |
| DF | (Wales) | Barry Tucker | 4 | 0 | 0 | 4 |
| DF | (Scotland) | Jim McNichol | 3 | 0 | 0 | 3 |
| DF | (England) | Alan Whitehead | 3 | 0 | 0 | 3 |
| MF | (England) | David Crown | 2 | — | 0 | 2 |
| MF | (England) | Terry Hurlock | 2 | 0 | 0 | 2 |
| FW | (England) | David Kemp | 1 | — | — | 1 |
| FW | (Canada) | Gordon Sweetzer | 1 | — | — | 1 |
| Opponents | | | 1 | 0 | 0 | 1 |
| Total | | | 56 | 3 | 0 | 59 |

- Players listed in italics left the club mid-season.
- Source: The Big Brentford Book of the Eighties

=== Management ===
| Name | Nat | From | To | Record All Comps | | | | | Record League | | | | |
| Name | Nat | From | To | P | W | D | L | W % | P | W | D | L | W % |
|---|---|---|---|---|---|---|---|---|---|---|---|---|---|
| Fred Callaghan | (England) | 29 August 1981 | 15 May 1982 | 51 | 20 | 12 | 19 | 39.22 | 46 | 19 | 11 | 16 | 41.30 |

=== Summary ===
| Games played | 51 (46 Third Division, 3 FA Cup, 2 League Cup) |
| Games won | 20 (19 Third Division, 1 FA Cup, 0 League Cup) |
| Games drawn | 12 (11 Third Division, 1 FA Cup, 0 League Cup) |
| Games lost | 19 (16 Third Division, 1 FA Cup, 2 League Cup) |
| Goals scored | 59 (56 Third Division, 3 FA Cup, 0 League Cup) |
| Goals conceded | 52 (47 Third Division, 2 FA Cup, 3 League Cup) |
| Clean sheets | 16 (15 Third Division, 1 FA Cup, 0 League Cup) |
| Biggest league win | 3–0 versus Swindon Town, 3 November 1981; 4–1 versus Millwall, 9 April 1982 |
| Worst league defeat | 3–0 versus Walsall, 19 January 1982; 4–1 versus Reading, 27 January 1982 |
| Most appearances | 50, David McKellar (45 Third Division, 3 FA Cup, 2 League Cup) |
| Top scorer (league) | 8, Keith Bowen, Gary Johnson, Gary Roberts |
| Top scorer (all competitions) | 10, Keith Bowen |

== Transfers & loans ==
Players transferred in
| Date | Pos. | Name | Previous club | Fee | Ref. |
|---|---|---|---|---|---|
| August 1981 | GK | (England) Paul Priddy | (England) Hayes | n/a | |
| August 1981 | DF | (England) Alan Whitehead | (England) Bury | £65,000 | |
| September 1981 | FW | (Wales) Keith Bowen | (England) Northampton Town | n/a | |
| October 1981 | MF | (England) Stan Bowles | (England) Orient | £25,000 | |
| October 1981 | MF | (England) Chris Kamara | (England) Portsmouth | Exchange | |
| 1981 | MF | (England) Keith Tonge | n/a | n/a | |
| January 1982 | FW | (Canada) Gordon Sweetzer | (Canada) Toronto Blizzard | Trial | |
| March 1982 | DF | (England) Tony Spencer | n/a | n/a | |
Players loaned in
| Date from | Pos. | Name | From | Date to | Ref. |
| March 1982 | FW | (England) David Kemp | (England) Plymouth Argyle | March 1982 | |
Players transferred out
| Date | Pos. | Name | Subsequent club | Fee | Ref. |
| September 1981 | FW | (England) Tony Funnell | (England) Bournemouth | £5,000 | |
| October 1981 | MF | (England) David Crown | (England) Portsmouth | Exchange | |
Players loaned out
| Date from | Pos. | Name | To | Date to | Ref. |
| February 1982 | DF | (England) Pat Kruse | (England) Northampton Town | April 1982 | |
Players released
| Date | Pos. | Name | Subsequent club | Join date | Ref. |
| March 1982 | FW | (Canada) Gordon Sweetzer | (Canada) Edmonton Drillers | 1982 | |
| April 1982 | DF | (England) Pat Kruse | (England) Barnet | 1982 | |
| May 1982 | DF | (England) Mark Hill | (England) Wycombe Wanderers | 1982 | |
| May 1982 | DF | (England) Robbie Johnson | (England) Hayes | 1982 | |
| May 1982 | GK | (England) Paul Priddy | Retired | | |
| May 1982 | MF | (England) Paul Shrubb | (England) Aldershot | August 1982 | |
| May 1982 | DF | (England) Kevin Teer | n/a | n/a | |

== Awards ==
- Supporters' Player of the Year: Stan Bowles
- Players' Player of the Year: Alan Whitehead
