= Lee Frost =

Lee Frost may refer to:

- Lee Frost (footballer)
- Lee Frost (director)
