= Paul Walker (footballer, born 1960) =

English footballer

Personal information
- Full name: Paul James Walker
- Date of birth: 17 December 1960 (age 65)
- Place of birth: Wood Green, England
- Position: Midfielder

Youth career
- 1975–1978: Brentford

Senior career*
Years	Team	Apps	(Gls)
1976–1983	Brentford	71	(5)
- → Marlow (loan)
1977	→ Slough Town (loan)	5	(0)
1983–????	Johannesburg Rangers		

International career
1976	England Schoolboys	8	(2)

Managerial career
- 2000–2001: Chertsey Town
- 2001–2002: Egham Town
- * Club domestic league appearances and goals

Paul James Walker (born 17 December 1960) is an English former professional footballer who played as a midfielder in the Football League for Brentford and is the club's youngest-ever debutant. He captained England Schoolboys and later managed in non-League football.

== Career ==
Walker joined Brentford on schoolboy forms in September 1975 and made his professional debut on 14 August 1976, aged just 15 years, 7 months, 28 days. He made a total of 71 appearances for Brentford in the Football League, scoring five goals. Walker later played in South Africa for Johannesburg Rangers.

== Career statistics ==
Appearances and goals by club, season and competition
Club	Season	League			FA Cup		League Cup		Total	
Club	Season	Division	Apps	Goals	Apps	Goals	Apps	Goals	Apps	Goals
Brentford	1976–77	Fourth Division	2	0	1	0	2	0	5	0
Brentford	1977–78	Fourth Division	5	0	0	0	0	0	5	0
Brentford	1978–79	Third Division	7	0	0	0	0	0	7	0
Brentford	1979–80	Third Division	3	0	0	0	0	0	3	0
Brentford	1980–81	Third Division	29	4	3	0	2	1	34	5
Brentford	1981–82	Third Division	9	0	0	0	1	0	10	0
Brentford	1982–83	Third Division	16	1	0	0	0	0	16	1
Brentford	Total		71	5	4	0	5	1	80	6
Slough Town (loan)	1976–77	Isthmian League First Division	5	0	—		—		5	0
Career total			76	5	4	0	5	1	85	6
