= 1980–81 Brentford F.C. season =

English football team season

Brentford
1980–81 season
- Chairman: Dan Tana
- Manager: Fred Callaghan
- Stadium: Griffin Park
- Third Division: 9th
- FA Cup: Second round
- League Cup: First round
- Top goalscorer: League: Booker (7); All: Booker, Crown, Funnell (8)
- Highest home attendance: 11,610
- Lowest home attendance: 4,883
- Average home league attendance: 6,752
Home colours	Away colours

During the 1980–81 English football season, Brentford competed in the Football League Third Division. In a mid-table season, the Bees drew a club-record 19 league matches.

== Season summary ==
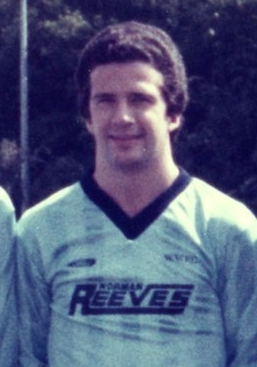
Free transfer left back signing Mark Hill made 42 appearances during the season.

After narrowly saving Brentford from relegation to the Fourth Division at the end of the previous season, interim manager Fred Callaghan was given the job on a full-time basis, with Ron Harris appointed as his assistant. Callaghan conducted a clear-out of the squad, releasing captain Jackie Graham and bit-part players Doug Allder, Allan Glover, Billy Holmes and Trevor Porter. Aside from Ron Harris (who would continue his playing career), Callaghan brought in five new players, with £20,000 laid out on midfielders David Crown, Terry Hurlock and Barry Silkman. £55,000 was generated from the sales of forwards Steve Phillips and Lee Holmes, but Callaghan was presented with a problem when Len Bond, Barry Tucker, John Fraser and Dave Carlton, mainstays of the team for the previous two years, refused to sign new contracts. All but Tucker would depart Griffin Park during the early months of the season, with Bond fetching a £12,000 fee.

Brentford had a mixed start to the season, exiting the League Cup at the first hurdle, but three wins and two draws from six matches in September 1980 put the club in 6th position. Gradually the season played itself out into one of consolidation in mid-table, with Callaghan continuing to overhaul his squad. Forwards Gary Johnson and Lee Frost arrived from Chelsea in December 1980 for a £30,000 fee, while squad members Willie Graham, Iori Jenkins and Dean Smith were released in February 1981. Brentford ended the season in 9th place, off the back of a run of just two defeats in the final 21 matches. Bob Booker finished the season as the team's top scorer in league matches, with a meagre seven goals.

Four club records were set or equalled during the season:

- Most Football League draws in a season: 19
- Most Football League away draws in a season: 10
- Most consecutive away Football League draws: 6 (27 December 1980 – 7 March 1981)
- Most consecutive away Football League clean sheets: 4 (6 September – 8 October 1980)

== League table ==
Pos	Team	Pld	W	D	L	GF	GA	GD	Pts
7	Plymouth Argyle	46	19	14	13	56	44	+12	52
8	Burnley	46	18	14	14	60	48	+12	50
9	Brentford	46	14	19	13	52	49	+3	47
10	Reading	46	18	10	18	62	62	0	46
11	Exeter City	46	16	13	17	62	66	−4	45

Source: rsssf.com

== Results ==
Brentford's goal tally listed first.

=== Legend ===
Win	Draw	Loss

=== Pre-season and friendlies ===
Date	Opponent	Venue	Result	Attendance	Scorer(s)
28 July 1980	Yeovil Town	A	2–2	n/a	Booker, Crown
31 July 1980	Hounslow	A	1–1	n/a	Funnell
2 August 1980	Wimbledon	A	1–2	772	Booker
4 August 1980	Slough Town	A	0–2	n/a	
6 August 1980	Chelsea	H	3–0	4,550	Smith, Hill, Crown
5 February 1981	Hillingdon Borough	A	1–4	n/a	Pullen
9 March 1981	KB	H	3–0	2,090	Funnell (3)
19 March 1981	Dorchester Town	A	1–0	n/a	Roberts
14 April 1981	Walthamstow Avenue	A	5–2	n/a	Crown (2), Funnell, Roberts, McKellar (pen)
27 April 1981	Walton & Hersham	A	2–2	n/a	Crown (2)
28 April 1981	Leytonstone/Ilford	A	1–4	n/a	Booker
5 May 1981	Wembley	A	4–2	n/a	Roberts (2), R. Johnson
7 May 1981	NK GOŠK Dubrovnik	A	1–3	n/a	Harris
12 May 1981	HNK Hajduk Split	A	1–1	n/a	Shrubb

=== Football League Third Division ===
No.	Date	Opponent	Venue	Result	Attendance	Scorer(s)
1	16 August 1980	Charlton Athletic	A	1–3	5,125	Hill
2	18 August 1980	Millwall	H	1–0	6,524	Funnell
3	23 August 1980	Reading	H	1–2	6,717	Funnell
4	30 August 1980	Walsall	A	3–2	4,586	Walker, Hill, Funnell
5	6 September 1980	Portsmouth	A	2–0	16,971	Booker, Funnell
6	13 September 1980	Fulham	H	1–3	11,610	Booker
7	15 September 1980	Barnsley	H	1–1	6,935	Funnell
8	20 September 1980	Blackpool	A	3–0	3,738	Crown (2), Walker
9	27 September 1980	Hull City	H	2–2	6,305	Jenkins, Funnell
10	30 September 1980	Barnsley	A	1–0	11,227	Walker
11	4 October 1980	Newport County	H	0–1	7,309	
12	8 October 1980	Exeter City	A	0–0	4,665	
13	11 October 1980	Carlisle United	A	2–1	3,030	Walker, Silkman (pen)
14	18 October 1980	Chester	H	0–1	6,604	
15	20 October 1980	Gillingham	H	3–3	6,786	Crown, Hurlock, Smith
16	25 October 1980	Burnley	A	0–2	7,324	
17	28 October 1980	Plymouth Argyle	A	1–0	7,249	Smith
18	1 November 1980	Oxford United	H	3–0	6,549	Hill, Crown (2)
19	3 November 1980	Exeter City	H	0–1	6,593	
20	8 November 1980	Chesterfield	A	1–2	7,127	Graham
21	11 November 1980	Millwall	A	2–2	4,279	Booker, Hurlock
22	15 November 1980	Charlton Athletic	H	0–1	8,181	
23	29 November 1980	Huddersfield Town	A	0–3	8,871	
24	6 December 1980	Swindon Town	H	1–1	5,727	Kruse
25	20 December 1980	Rotherham United	A	1–4	5,913	G. Johnson
26	26 December 1980	Colchester United	H	2–1	6,241	Kruse, Hurlock
27	27 December 1980	Sheffield United	A	0–0	13,130	
28	3 January 1981	Burnley	H	0–0	6,379	
29	10 January 1981	Chester	A	0–0	2,237	
30	17 January 1981	Huddersfield Town	H	0–0	5,831	
31	24 January 1981	Walsall	H	4–0	5,503	Frost, G. Johnson, Shrubb
32	31 January 1981	Reading	A	0–0	6,374	
33	7 February 1981	Fulham	A	1–1	8,627	Roberts
34	14 February 1981	Portsmouth	H	2–2	10,162	Tucker (pen), Roberts
35	21 February 1981	Hull City	A	0–0	4,535	
36	28 February 1981	Blackpool	H	2–0	5,850	G. Johnson, Frost
37	7 March 1981	Newport County	A	1–1	5,270	Crown
38	14 March 1981	Carlisle United	H	1–1	6,209	Frost
39	21 March 1981	Gillingham	A	0–2	3,916	
40	28 March 1981	Plymouth Argyle	H	0–1	5,868	
41	4 April 1981	Oxford United	A	1–1	4,085	Booker
42	11 April 1981	Chesterfield	H	3–2	4,883	Roberts, G. Johnson, Ridley (og)
43	18 April 1981	Sheffield United	H	1–1	5,622	Booker
44	20 April 1981	Colchester United	A	2–0	2,609	Shrubb, Booker
45	25 April 1981	Rotherham United	H	2–1	6,909	Booker, Hurlock
46	2 May 1981	Swindon Town	A	0–0	8,968	

=== FA Cup ===
Round	Date	Opponent	Venue	Result	Attendance	Scorer(s)	Notes
1R	22 November 1980	Addlestone & Weybridge Town	A	2–2	6,536	Booker, Funnell (pen)	(Note: Match played at Griffin Park, Brentford. Brentford wore away colours.)
1R (replay)	25 November 1980	Addlestone & Weybridge Town	H	2–0	7,678	Crown, Funnell	
2R	13 December 1980	Fulham	A	0–1	11,261		

=== Football League Cup ===
Round	Date	Opponent	Venue	Result	Attendance	Scorer(s)
1R (1st leg)	9 August 1980	Charlton Athletic	H	3–1	5,847	Crown, Smith, Walker
1R (2nd leg)	12 August 1980	Charlton Athletic	A	0–5 (lost 6–3 on aggregate)	3,764	

- Sources: 100 Years of Brentford, The Big Brentford Book of the Eighties, Statto

== Playing squad ==
Players' ages are as of the opening day of the 1980–81 season.

Pos.	Name	Nat.	Date of birth (age)	Signed from	Signed in	Notes
Goalkeepers
GK	Paul McCullough	(England)	26 October 1959 (aged 20)	Dawlish Town	1980	
GK	David McKellar	(Scotland)	22 May 1956 (aged 24)	Derby County	1980	Loaned from Derby County before transferring permanently
Defenders
DF	Mark Hill	(England)	21 January 1961 (aged 19)	Queens Park Rangers	1980	
DF	Robbie Johnson	(England)	30 March 1962 (aged 18)	Arsenal	1981	
DF	Pat Kruse	(England)	30 November 1953 (aged 26)	Torquay United	1977	
DF	Jim McNichol	(Scotland)	9 June 1958 (aged 22)	Luton Town	1978	
DF	Danis Salman	(England)	12 March 1960 (aged 20)	Youth	1975	
DF	Paul Shrubb	(England)	1 August 1955 (aged 25)	Hellenic	1977	
DF	Barry Tucker	(Wales)	28 August 1952 (aged 27)	Northampton Town	1978	
Midfielders
MF	David Crown	(England)	16 February 1958 (aged 22)	Walthamstow Avenue	1980	
MF	Lee Frost	(England)	4 December 1957 (aged 22)	Chelsea	1980	
MF	Tony Funnell	(England)	20 August 1957 (aged 22)	Gillingham	1980	
MF	Ron Harris (c)	(England)	13 November 1944 (aged 35)	Chelsea	1980	Assistant manager
MF	Terry Hurlock	(England)	22 November 1958 (aged 21)	Leytonstone/Ilford	1980	
MF	Gary Roberts	(Wales)	5 April 1960 (aged 20)	Wembley	1980	
MF	Kevin Teer	(England)	7 December 1963 (aged 16)	Youth	1981	
MF	Paul Walker	(England)	17 December 1960 (aged 19)	Youth	1976	
Forwards
FW	Bob Booker	(England)	25 January 1958 (aged 22)	Bedmond Sports & Social	1978	
FW	Gary Johnson	(England)	14 September 1959 (aged 20)	Chelsea	1980	
Players who left the club mid-season
DF	Iori Jenkins	(Wales)	11 December 1959 (aged 20)	Chelsea	1979	Released
MF	Willie Graham	(Northern Ireland)	14 February 1959 (aged 21)	Northampton Town	1977	Transferred to Hillingdon Borough
MF	Barry Silkman	(England)	29 June 1952 (aged 28)	Manchester City	1980	Transferred to Queens Park Rangers
FW	Dean Smith	(England)	28 November 1958 (aged 21)	Leicester City	1977	Released

- Sources: The Big Brentford Book of the Eighties, Timeless Bees

== Coaching staff ==
Name	Role
(England) Fred Callaghan	Manager
(England) Ron Harris	Assistant Manager
(England) Eddie Lyons	Physiotherapist
(England) John Griffin	Chief Scout

== Statistics ==
=== Appearances and goals ===
Substitute appearances in brackets.

Pos	Nat	Name	League		FA Cup		League Cup		Total	
Pos	Nat	Name	Apps	Goals	Apps	Goals	Apps	Goals	Apps	Goals
GK	(England)	Paul McCullough	7	0	0	0	0	2	9	0
GK	(Scotland)	David McKellar	39	0	3	0	0	0	42	0
DF	(England)	Mark Hill	37 (1)	3	2	0	2	0	41 (1)	3
DF	(Wales)	Iori Jenkins	11 (3)	1	0	0	2	0	13 (3)	1
DF	(England)	Robbie Johnson	1	0	—		—		1	0
DF	(England)	Pat Kruse	42	2	3	0	2	0	47	2
DF	(Scotland)	Jim McNichol	11 (3)	0	1	0	0	0	12 (3)	0
DF	(England)	Danis Salman	38	0	2	0	0 (1)	0	40 (1)	0
DF	(England)	Paul Shrubb	38 (4)	2	3	0	2	0	43 (4)	2
DF	(Wales)	Barry Tucker	23	1	1	0	0	0	24	1
MF	(England)	David Crown	37 (1)	6	3	1	2	1	42 (1)	8
MF	(England)	Lee Frost	15	3	—		—		15	3
MF	(England)	Tony Funnell	21 (2)	6	2 (1)	2	0	0	23 (3)	8
MF	(Northern Ireland)	Willie Graham	5	1	0	0	0	0	5	1
MF	(England)	Ron Harris	29	0	3	0	2	0	34	0
MF	(England)	Terry Hurlock	42	4	3	0	0	0	45	4
MF	(Wales)	Gary Roberts	14 (5)	3	0	0	—		14 (5)	3
MF	(England)	Barry Silkman	14	1	—		2	0	16	1
MF	(England)	Kevin Teer	0 (1)	0	0	0	0	0	0 (1)	0
MF	(England)	Paul Walker	29	4	3	0	2	1	34	5
FW	(England)	Bob Booker	25 (1)	7	3	1	2	0	30 (1)	8
FW	(England)	Gary Johnson	22	5	—		—		22	5
FW	(England)	Dean Smith	6 (1)	2	1	0	2	1	9 (1)	3

- Players listed in italics left the club mid-season.
- Source: The Big Brentford Book of the Eighties

=== Goalscorers ===
Pos.	Nat	Player	FL3	FAC	FLC	Total
FW	(England)	Bob Booker	7	1	0	8
MF	(England)	Tony Funnell	6	2	0	8
MF	(England)	David Crown	6	1	1	8
FW	(England)	Gary Johnson	5	—	—	5
MF	(England)	Paul Walker	4	0	1	5
MF	(England)	Terry Hurlock	4	0	0	4
MF	(England)	Lee Frost	3	—	—	3
MF	(Wales)	Gary Roberts	3	0	—	3
DF	(England)	Mark Hill	3	0	0	3
FW	(England)	Dean Smith	2	0	1	3
DF	(England)	Pat Kruse	2	0	0	2
DF	(England)	Paul Shrubb	2	0	0	2
MF	(England)	Barry Silkman	1	—	0	1
MF	(Northern Ireland)	Willie Graham	1	0	0	1
DF	(Wales)	Iori Jenkins	1	0	0	1
DF	(Wales)	Barry Tucker	1	0	0	1
Opponents			1	0	0	1
Total			52	4	3	59

- Players listed in italics left the club mid-season.
- Source: The Big Brentford Book of the Eighties

=== Management ===
Name	Nat	From	To	Record All Comps					Record League				
Name	Nat	From	To	P	W	D	L	W %	P	W	D	L	W %
Fred Callaghan	(England)	9 August 1980	2 May 1981	51	16	20	15	31.37	46	14	19	13	30.43

=== Summary ===
Games played	51 (46 Third Division, 3 FA Cup, 2 League Cup)
Games won	16 (14 Third Division, 1 FA Cup, 1 League Cup)
Games drawn	20 (19 Third Division, 1 FA Cup, 0 League Cup)
Games lost	15 (13 Third Division, 1 FA Cup, 1 League Cup)
Goals scored	59 (52 Third Division, 4 FA Cup, 3 League Cup)
Goals conceded	58 (49 Third Division, 3 FA Cup, 6 League Cup)
Clean sheets	18 (17 Third Division, 1 FA Cup, 0 League Cup)
Biggest league win	4–0 versus Walsall, 24 January 1981
Worst league defeat	3–0 versus Huddersfield Town, 29 November 1980; 4–1 versus Rotherham United, 20 December 1980
Most appearances	47, Pat Kruse, Paul Shrubb (42 Third Division, 3 FA Cup, 2 League Cup)
Top scorer (league)	7, Bob Booker
Top scorer (all competitions)	8, Bob Booker, David Crown

== Transfers & loans ==
Players transferred in
Date	Pos.	Name	Previous club	Fee	Ref.
May 1980	MF	(England) Ron Harris	(England) Chelsea	n/a	
July 1980	MF	(England) David Crown	(England) Walthamstow Avenue	£5,000	
July 1980	DF	(England) Mark Hill	(England) Queens Park Rangers	Free	
July 1980	GK	(England) Paul McCullough	(England) Dawlish Town	n/a	
August 1980	MF	(England) Terry Hurlock	(England) Leytonstone/Ilford	£10,000	
August 1980	MF	(England) Barry Silkman	(England) Manchester City	£5,000	
October 1980	GK	(Scotland) David McKellar	(England) Derby County	£25,000	
October 1980	MF	(Wales) Gary Roberts	(England) Wembley	£6,000	
December 1980	FW	(England) Lee Frost	(England) Chelsea	n/a	
December 1980	FW	(England) Gary Johnson	(England) Chelsea	£30,000	
1980	DF	(England) Kevin Teer	n/a	n/a	
1980	DF	(England) Terry Rowe	n/a	n/a	
March 1981	DF	(England) Robbie Johnson	(England) Arsenal	Trial	
Players loaned in
Date from	Pos.	Name	From	Date to	Ref.
September 1980	GK	(Scotland) David McKellar	(England) Derby County	October 1980	
Players transferred out
Date	Pos.	Name	Subsequent club	Fee	Ref.
August 1980	FW	(England) Steve Phillips	(England) Northampton Town	£50,000	
October 1980	GK	(England) Len Bond	(England) Exeter City	£12,000	
October 1980	MF	(England) Barry Silkman	(England) Queens Park Rangers	£20,000	
1980	FW	(England) Lee Holmes	(England) Enfield	£5,000	
Players released
Date	Pos.	Name	Subsequent club	Join date	Ref.
August 1980	MF	(England) Dave Carlton	(England) Northampton Town	September 1980	
August 1980	MF	(England) John Fraser	(England) Oxford City	1980	
November 1980	DF	(England) Dave O'Mahoney	n/a	n/a	
February 1981	MF	(Northern Ireland) Willie Graham	(England) Hillingdon Borough	February 1981	
February 1981	DF	(Wales) Iori Jenkins	(England) Kettering Town	1981	
February 1981	FW	(England) Dean Smith	(England) Nuneaton Borough	February 1981	
May 1981	FW	(England) Lee Frost	(England) Addlestone & Weybridge Town	1981	
May 1981	GK	(England) Paul McCullough	(Sweden) Mjällby AIF	n/a	

== Awards ==
- Supporters' Player of the Year: Terry Hurlock
- Players' Player of the Year: Terry Hurlock
