= Tony Funnell =

English footballer

Personal information
- Full name: Anthony Funnell
- Date of birth: 20 August 1957 (age 69)
- Place of birth: Eastbourne, England
- Position: Forward

Youth career
- Newhaven

Senior career*
Years	Team	Apps	(Gls)
1975–1977	Eastbourne United		
1977–1979	Southampton	17	(8)
1977	→ Vancouver Whitecaps (loan)	10	(2)
1979–1980	Gillingham	33	(10)
1980–1981	Brentford	32	(8)
1981–1983	Bournemouth	64	(22)
- Poole Town

Managerial career
- Hamworthy United
- Wimborne Town
- * Club domestic league appearances and goals

Anthony Funnell (born 20 August 1957) is an English retired professional footballer who played as a forward in the Football League.

Funnell played in the Football League for Bournemouth, Gillingham, Brentford and Southampton. After a back injury forced him to retire from League football, Funnell he had a notable spell with Poole Town in non-League football. He made over 300 appearances and was inducted into the club's Hall of Fame in 2014. Funnell later became a manager.

== Playing career ==
=== Southampton ===
After rising to prominence at Athenian League club Eastbourne United, Funnell joined Second Division club Southampton for a £250 fee in January 1977. Funnell played the 1977 English off-season in Canada with North American Soccer League club Vancouver Whitecaps. He scored two goals in 10 games for the club, which fell to the Seattle Sounders in the first round of the playoffs.

Funnell made an impression during the second half of the 1977–78 season, scoring 8 league goals to help the Saints clinch promotion to First Division with a second-place finish. The higher level of football during the 1978–79 season meant Funnell rarely figured in the first team picture and he departed The Dell in March 1979. Funnell made 20 appearances and scored 9 goals during his time with Southampton.

=== Gillingham ===
In March 1979, Funnell transferred to Third Division club Gillingham for a then-club record fee of £50,000. He made 38 appearances and scored 10 goals during just over a year at Priestfield.

=== Brentford ===
Funnell joined Third Division club Brentford for a then-club record fee of £56,000 in March 1980. Not rated by incoming manager Fred Callaghan, he made only 23 appearances and scored six goals during his only full season at Griffin Park. Funnell departed the Bees in the summer of 1981, having made 35 appearances and scored 10 goals.

=== Bournemouth ===
Funnell signed for Fourth Division club AFC Bournemouth in September 1981 for a £5,000 fee. Under David Webb's management, he had the best season of his career in 1981–82, top-scoring 16 goals in 43 league games to help the Cherries to promotion to Division Three with a fourth-place finish. A back injury during the 1982–83 season ended Funnell's career in league football. He made 64 appearances and scored 22 goals during his time at Dean Court.

=== Poole Town ===
After two years in Sunday league football, Funnell moved into non-League football to join Southern League Premier Division club Poole Town in 1985. During a long spell with the club, Funnell scored 127 goals in 308 appearances for the Dolphins. He was recognised for his service with a testimonial versus former club Southampton in May 1991 and he was inducted into the club's Hall of Fame in 2014.

== Managerial career ==
Funnell had spells as manager of Dorset League club Hamworthy United and Wessex League club Wimborne Town.

== Personal life ==
Funnell's son Gary is also a footballer, who represented non-League clubs Wimborne Town, Salisbury City and Poole Town, in addition to the England beach football team at international level.

== Career statistics ==
Appearances and goals by club, season and competition
Club	Season	League			National cup (Note: Includes FA Cup)		League cup (Note: Includes Football League Cup)		Total	
Club	Season	Division	Apps	Goals	Apps	Goals	Apps	Goals	Apps	Goals
Southampton	1977–78	Second Division	15	8	1	0	2	1	18	9
Southampton	1978–79	First Division	2	0	0	0	0	0	2	0
Southampton	Total		17	8	2	0	2	1	20	9
Vancouver Whitecaps (loan)	1977	North American Soccer League	10	2	—		—		10	2
Gillingham	1978–79	Third Division	12	7	—		—		12	7
Gillingham	1979–80	Third Division	21	3	2	0	3	0	26	3
Gillingham	Total		33	10	2	0	3	0	38	10
Brentford	1979–80	Third Division	9	2	—		—		9	2
Brentford	1980–81	Third Division	23	6	3	2	0	0	26	8
Brentford	Total		32	8	3	2	0	0	35	10
Career total			92	28	7	2	5	1	103	31

== Honours ==
Southampton

- Football League Second Division second-place promotion: 1977–78

Bournemouth

- Football League Fourth Division fourth-place promotion: 1981–82

Individual

- Poole Town Hall of Fame
