= Paul McCullough (footballer) =

English footballer

Personal information
- Full name: Paul James McCullough
- Date of birth: 26 October 1959 (age 67)
- Place of birth: Birmingham, England
- Position: Goalkeeper

Youth career
- Torquay United

Senior career*
Years	Team	Apps	(Gls)
- Brixham United
1978–1979	Reading	0	(0)
1979–1980	Dawlish Town		
1980–1981	Brentford	7	(0)
	Mjällby	1	(0)
- * Club domestic league appearances and goals

Paul James McCullough (born 26 October 1959) is an English retired professional footballer who played in the Football League for Brentford as a goalkeeper.

== Career statistics ==
Appearances and goals by club, season and competition
Club	Season	League			FA Cup		League Cup		Total	
Club	Season	Division	Apps	Goals	Apps	Goals	Apps	Goals	Apps	Goals
Brentford	1980–81	Third Division	7	0	0	0	2	0	9	0
Career total			7	0	0	0	2	0	9	0
