= Iori Jenkins =

Welsh footballer (born 1959)

Personal information
- Full name: Iorweth Clifford Jenkins
- Date of birth: 11 December 1959 (age 66)
- Place of birth: Neath, Wales
- Position: Defender

Youth career
- Chelsea

Senior career*
Years	Team	Apps	(Gls)
1978–1979	Chelsea	0	(0)
1979–1981	Brentford	15	(1)
1981–1984	Kettering Town		
- Desborough Town

International career
- Wales Schoolboys

Managerial career
- Rushden Town
- Wellingborough Town
- Stewarts & Lloyds Corby
- Northamptonshire FA Youth
- Rothwell Town (reserves)
- * Club domestic league appearances and goals

Iorweth Clifford Jenkins (born 11 December 1959) is a Welsh retired professional footballer who played as a defender in the Football League for Brentford. He later dropped into non-League football and held managerial and coaching roles at a number of clubs and associations in Northamptonshire.

== Club career ==
A defender, Jenkins began his career in the youth system at Second Division club Chelsea and signed his first professional contract in 1978. He failed to make a senior appearance at Stamford Bridge and departed to join Third Division club Brentford in November 1979. Despite being signed by Bill Dodgin Jr., he failed to break into the team until the appointment of Fred Callaghan in April 1980. Jenkins made 17 appearances and scored one goal before departing Griffin Park in January 1981. He dropped into non-League football and joined Alliance Premier League club Kettering Town.

== International career ==
Jenkins represented Wales at schoolboy level.

== Coaching & managerial career ==
Jenkins held managerial roles at Northamptonshire non-League clubs Rushden Town, Wellingborough Town and Stewarts & Lloyds Corby. During the 2003–04 season, he managed the Northamptonshire FA representative youth team, before being appointed assistant manager at United Counties League First Division club Irchester United in June 2004. He quickly moved on to join Rothwell Town as reserve team manager the following month.

== Personal life ==
When he quit professional football in January 1981, Jenkins joined the Police. Jenkins' son Callum became a non-League footballer.

== Career statistics ==
Appearances and goals by club, season and competition
Club	Season	League			FA Cup		League Cup		Total	
Club	Season	Division	Apps	Goals	Apps	Goals	Apps	Goals	Apps	Goals
Brentford	1979–80	Third Division	1	0	—		—		1	0
Brentford	1980–81	Third Division	14	1	0	0	2	0	16	1
Career total			15	1	0	0	2	0	17	1
