= Mark Hill (English footballer) =

English footballer (born 1961)

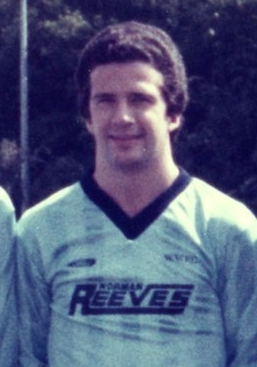
- Hill while with Wycombe Wanderers in 1983.

Personal information
- Full name: Mark Stephen Hill
- Date of birth: 21 January 1961 (age 65)
- Place of birth: Perivale, England
- Position: Left back

Youth career
- 1977–1979: Queens Park Rangers

Senior career*
| Years | Team | Apps | (Gls) |
| 1979–1980 | Queens Park Rangers | 0 | (0) |
| 1980–1982 | Brentford | 56 | (3) |
| 1982–1984 | Wycombe Wanderers | 68 | (3) |
| 1984–1989 | Maidstone United | 184 | (9) |
| 1989–1992 | Slough Town | 71 | (1) |
| 1992–1994 | Hendon | 47 | (0) |
- Wealdstone
- Walton & Hersham

Managerial career
- 1999: Walton & Hersham (joint-caretaker)
- * Club domestic league appearances and goals

Mark Stephen Hill (born 21 January 1961) is an English retired professional footballer, best remembered for his five years as a left back in non-League football with Maidstone United. Earlier in his career, he played in the Football League for Brentford.

== Playing career ==
=== Queens Park Rangers ===
A left back, Hill began his youth career with Queens Park Rangers and signed a professional contract at the end of the 1978–79 season. Despite Rangers' relegation to the Second Division, he failed to make a first team appearance during the 1979–80 season and departed Loftus Road at the end of the campaign.

=== Brentford ===
Hill joined Third Division club Brentford in July 1980, as one of new manager Fred Callaghan's first signings. Aged only 19, Hill held a regular place in the first team during the 1980–81 season and made 42 appearances, scoring three goals. He scored on his debut versus Charlton Athletic and scored one goal for and against the Bees in front of the ATV cameras during a 3–2 win at Walsall a fortnight later. Hill fell out of favour in the following season and made just 20 appearances before his release in June 1982. He made 62 appearances and scored three goals during his two seasons at Griffin Park.

=== Wycombe Wanderers ===
Hill dropped into non-League football to join Isthmian League Premier Division club Wycombe Wanderers during the 1983 off-season. He had an excellent start to life at Loakes Park, reaching the first round proper of the FA Cup, the final of the Isthmian League Cup and winning the first silverware of his career as the Chairboys cruised to the 1982–83 Premier Division title. The club declined a place in the Alliance Premier League and Hill remained with the Chairboys until the end of the 1983–84 season.

=== Maidstone United ===
Hill transferred to Alliance Premier League champions Maidstone United in 1984. He was a regular pick during a five-year spell with the club and in the 1988–89 season was part of the team which won the Kent Senior Cup and finished top of the renamed Football Conference, which secured promotion to the Football League for the first time in the club's history.

=== Slough Town ===
Hill dropped to the Isthmian League Premier Division to transfer to Slough Town during the 1989 off-season. Given the captain's armband, he had an excellent first season, leading the team to the league title and promotion to the Conference. Hill remained with the Rebels until the end of the 1991–92 season and made 93 appearances for the club, scoring three goals.

=== Hendon ===
Hill returned to the Isthmian League Premier Division to join Hendon during the 1992 off-season. He made 64 appearances and scored one goal during two mid-table seasons for the club.

=== Later years ===
Hill ended his career with spells at Isthmian League clubs Wealdstone and Walton & Hersham. He served Walton & Hersham in, at different times, the roles of player, assistant manager and joint-caretaker manager.

== Personal life ==
Hill spent 12 years working for Akai and as of 2012, had spent the previous 17 years working for LG Electronics in Slough, Berkshire. As of 2014, his son Lucas was a member of Wycombe Wanderers' development centre.

== Career statistics ==
Appearances and goals by club, season and competition
| Club | Season | League | | | FA Cup | | League Cup | | Other | | Total | |
| Club | Season | Division | Apps | Goals | Apps | Goals | Apps | Goals | Apps | Goals | Apps | Goals |
|---|---|---|---|---|---|---|---|---|---|---|---|---|
| Brentford | 1980–81 | Third Division | 38 | 3 | 2 | 0 | 2 | 0 | — | | 42 | 3 |
| Brentford | 1981–82 | Third Division | 18 | 0 | 0 | 0 | 2 | 0 | — | | 20 | 0 |
| Brentford | Total | | 56 | 3 | 2 | 0 | 4 | 0 | — | | 62 | 3 |
| Slough Town | 1989–90 | Isthmian League Premier Division | 11 | 0 | 4 | 1 | — | | 6 (Note: 2 appearances in FA Trophy, 2 appearances in Isthmian League Cup, 1 appearances in Berks & Bucks Senior Cup, 1 appearance in ClubCall Cup) | 0 | 21 | 1 |
| Slough Town | 1990–91 | Conference | 28 | 1 | 0 | 0 | — | | 2 (Note: 1 appearance in Conference League Cup, 1 appearance in Berks & Bucks Senior Cup) | 0 | 30 | 1 |
| Slough Town | 1991–92 | Conference | 32 | 0 | 4 | 0 | — | | 6 (Note: 3 appearances in FA Trophy, 2 appearances and 1 goal in Conference League Cup, 1 appearance in Berks & Bucks Senior Cup) | 1 | 42 | 1 |
| Slough Town | Total | | 71 | 1 | 8 | 1 | — | | 14 | 1 | 93 | 3 |
| Hendon | 1992–93 | Isthmian League Premier Division | 22 | 0 | 2 | 0 | — | | 7 (Note: 5 appearances in Isthmian League Cup, 2 appearances in FA Trophy) | 0 | 30 | 1 |
| Hendon | 1993–94 | Isthmian League Premier Division | 25 | 0 | 4 | 0 | — | | 4 (Note: 3 appearances and 1 goal in Isthmian League Full Members Cup, 1 appearance in Isthmian League Cup) | 1 | 34 | 0 |
| Hendon | Total | | 47 | 0 | 6 | 0 | — | | 11 | 1 | 64 | 1 |
| Career total | | | 174 | 4 | 16 | 1 | 4 | 0 | 25 | 2 | 219 | 7 |

== Honours ==
Slough Town

- Isthmian League Premier Division: 1989–90
