= Robbie Johnson =

English footballer

Personal information
- Full name: Robert Nicholas Johnson
- Date of birth: 30 March 1962 (age 64)
- Place of birth: Kensington, England
- Position: Left back

Youth career
- 1979–1981: Arsenal

Senior career*
Years	Team	Apps	(Gls)
1981–1982	Brentford	2	(0)
1982–1984	Hayes		
1984–1987	Harrow Borough		
	Enfield	3	(0)
1989–1990	Slough Town	40	(9)
- Yeading
- * Club domestic league appearances and goals

Robert Nicholas Johnson (born 30 March 1962) is an English retired professional footballer who played in the Football League for Brentford as a left back.

== Career statistics ==
Appearances and goals by club, season and competition
Club	Season	League			FA Cup		League Cup		Other		Total	
Club	Season	Division	Apps	Goals	Apps	Goals	Apps	Goals	Apps	Goals	Apps	Goals
Brentford	1980–81	Third Division	1	0	—		—		—		1	0
Brentford	1981–82	Third Division	1	0	0	0	0	0	—		1	0
Brentford	Total		2	0	0	0	0	0	—		2	0
Slough Town	1989–90	Isthmian League Premier Division	36	9	6	0	—		9 (Note: 3 appearances and 3 goals in FA Trophy, 3 appearances and 2 goals in Berks & Bucks Senior Cup, 2 appearances in Isthmian League Cup, 1 appearance in ClubCall Cup.)	5	51	14
Slough Town	1990–91	Conference	3	0	1	0	—		2 (Note: 2 appearances in Conference League Cup.)	0	6	0
Slough Town	Total		39	9	7	0	—		11	5	57	14
Career total			41	9	7	0	0	0	11	5	59	14
