= Paul Shrubb =

English footballer, coach, and scout (1955–2020)

Personal information
- Full name: Paul Shrubb
- Date of birth: 1 August 1955
- Place of birth: Guildford, England
- Date of death: 28 May 2020 (aged 64)
- Place of death: Guildford, England
- Height: 5 ft 8 in (1.73 m)
- Position: Utility player

Senior career*
Years	Team	Apps	(Gls)
1972–1975	Fulham	1	(0)
1975–1976	Hellenic		
1977–1982	Brentford	182	(8)
1982–1987	Aldershot	174	(5)
1987–1989	Woking		
1989–1990	Dorking		
1990–1991	Leatherhead		
1991	Fleet Town		
1991–1992	Cove		
1992–1995	Aldershot Town	31	(0)

Managerial career
- 1995: Aldershot Town (caretaker)
- * Club domestic league appearances and goals

Paul Shrubb (1 August 1955 – 28 May 2020) was an English professional footballer, coach and scout who made 350 appearances as a player in the Football League, most notably for Brentford and Aldershot. He later returned to Aldershot as assistant manager and coached at a number of non-League clubs.

== Playing career ==
=== Fulham ===
Shrubb began his career in the youth system at Second Division club Fulham and signed his first professional contract in 1972. He made his debut during the 1972–73 season, which would be his only appearance before his departure in 1975.

=== Hellenic ===
Shrubb moved to South Africa to sign for National Football League club Hellenic in 1975. The high point of his time with the club was reaching the final of the 1976 NFL Cup, which was lost to Cape Town City.

=== Brentford ===
Shrubb returned to England and joined Fourth Division club Brentford in March 1977. With a small squad of players, Shrubb blossomed as a utility player in defence and midfield and contributed to the Bees' promotion to the Third Division in the 1977–78 season. Shrubb took over as captain from Jackie Graham for a time, while Graham was out injured. Shrubb missed only a handful of games per season until the 1981–82 campaign, when he was dropped early in the season. He departed the Bees in August 1982, having made 198 appearances and scored eight goals during his five years with the club.

=== Aldershot ===
Shrubb signed for Fourth Division club Aldershot in August 1982. He made 202 appearances and scored six goals during a five-season spell and departed after the Shots' success in the 1987 Fourth Division play-off final. He put his skills as a utility player to good use, wearing every single shirt number (1–11) during his time with the club.

=== Non-League football ===
Shrubb dropped into non-League football in 1987 and had spells with Isthmian League clubs Woking, Dorking, Leatherhead, Cove and Wessex League club Fleet Town.

=== Return to Aldershot ===
Shrubb signed for Isthmian League Third Division phoenix club Aldershot Town in 1992. The Shots won the Third Division championship during the 1992–93 season and secured promotion to First Division in the following campaign. He made 31 appearances before retiring in January 1995. Shrubb was awarded a testimonial versus Charlton Athletic on 1 August 2007, in recognition of his service to the club.

== Management and coaching career ==
Between 1987 and 1992, Shrubb held player-coach roles with Woking, Dorking, Leatherhead, Fleet Town and Cove. When he returned to Aldershot in 1992, he became player-assistant manager of the club and was caretaker manager for one match in 1995, after the departure of Steve Wignall. He was offered the job on a permanent basis but turned it down, citing work commitments. After his retirement from playing, Shrubb served as Steve Wigley's assistant, before departing the Recreation Ground for the final time in 1997. He later served Hampton and Kingstonian as a coach and resigned from the latter club in April 2001, in protest over the sacking of fellow coach Ian McDonald.

== Scouting career ==
Shrubb served as a scout at Charlton Athletic, Plymouth Argyle and AFC Wimbledon. While with Plymouth Argyle, he worked alongside former Aldershot teammate Andy King.

== Personal life ==
Shrubb lived in Aldershot and ran his own window cleaning business. As of 2014, he was living in Ash, Surrey. Shrubb was diagnosed with motor neurone disease in January 2006 and was given two years to live by doctors. The condition forced him to give up full-time work in 2009. Shrubb died of the disease in May 2020.

== Career statistics ==
Appearances and goals by club, season and competition
Club	Season	League			FA Cup		League Cup		Total	
Club	Season	Division	Apps	Goals	Apps	Goals	Apps	Goals	Apps	Goals
Fulham	1972–73	Second Division	1	0	0	0	0	0	1	0
Brentford	1976–77	Fourth Division	13	2	—		—		13	2
Brentford	1977–78	Fourth Division	45	1	2	0	2	0	49	1
Brentford	1978–79	Third Division	39	2	1	0	2	0	42	2
Brentford	1979–80	Third Division	39	1	1	0	2	0	42	1
Brentford	1980–81	Third Division	42	2	3	0	2	0	47	2
Brentford	1981–82	Third Division	4	0	0	0	1	0	5	0
Brentford	Total		182	8	7	0	9	0	198	8
Career total			183	8	7	0	9	0	199	8

== Honours ==
Brentford

- Football League Fourth Division fourth-place promotion: 1977–78

Aldershot/Aldershot Town

- Football League Fourth Division play-offs: 1986–87
- Isthmian League Second Division third-place promotion: 1993–94
- Isthmian League Third Division: 1992–93
