= Kevin Teer =

English footballer

Personal information
- Full name: Kevin Paul Teer
- Date of birth: 7 December 1963 (age 62)
- Place of birth: Wood Green, England
- Position: Midfielder

Youth career
- 1980–1981: Brentford

Senior career*
Years	Team	Apps	(Gls)
1981–1982	Brentford	1	(0)
- * Club domestic league appearances and goals

Kevin Paul Teer (born 7 December 1963) is an English retired professional football midfielder who played in the Football League for Brentford.

== Career ==
Teer began his career in the youth team at Third Division club Brentford. He made one professional appearance for the club, coming on for Gary Roberts during a 0–0 league draw with Swindon Town on 2 May 1981. Teer failed to be offered a professional contract and departed at the end of the 1980–81 season.

== Career statistics ==
Club	Season	League			FA Cup		League Cup		Total	
Club	Season	Division	Apps	Goals	Apps	Goals	Apps	Goals	Apps	Goals
Brentford	1980–81	Third Division	1	0	0	0	0	0	1	0
Career total			1	0	0	0	0	0	1	0
