= David Crown =

English footballer (born 1958)

Personal information
- Full name: David Ian Crown
- Date of birth: 16 February 1958 (age 68)
- Place of birth: Enfield, England
- Height: 5 ft 10 in (1.78 m)
- Positions: Forward; winger

Senior career*
Years	Team	Apps	(Gls)
–1979	Grays Athletic		
1979–1980	Walthamstow Avenue		
1980–1981	Brentford	46	(8)
1981–1983	Portsmouth	28	(2)
1983	→ Exeter City (loan)	7	(3)
1983–1985	Reading	88	(14)
1985–1987	Cambridge United	116	(45)
1987–1990	Southend United	113	(61)
1990–1993	Gillingham	87	(40)
1993–1994	Dagenham & Redbridge	33	(9)
1994–1995	Purfleet		
1995–1996	Aylesbury United		
1996	Sudbury Town		
1996–	Billericay Town		
–1997	Concord Rangers		
1997–2001	Purfleet		

Managerial career
- Purfleet (player-manager)
- * Club domestic league appearances and goals

David Ian Crown (born 16 February 1958) is an English retired professional footballer who played as a forward in the Football League, most notably for Cambridge United and Southend United. He also played for Reading, Gillingham, Brentford, Portsmouth and Exeter City. Until March 2021, Crown's 24 goals in a Football League season stood as Cambridge United's club record. He later player-managed Purfleet in non-League football and served as assistant manager at Concord Rangers and Southend United.

== Personal life ==
As of October 2000, Crown was running an accountancy firm in Leigh-on-Sea. As of February 2020, he was working as a matchday host at former club Southend United.

== Career statistics ==
Appearances and goals by club, season and competition
Club	Season	League			FA Cup		League Cup		Other		Total	
Club	Season	Division	Apps	Goals	Apps	Goals	Apps	Goals	Apps	Goals	Apps	Goals
Brentford	1980–81	Third Division	38	6	3	1	2	1	—		43	8
Brentford	1981–82	Third Division	8	2	—		2	0	—		10	2
Brentford	Total		46	8	3	1	4	1	—		53	10
Portsmouth	1981–82	Third Division	27	2	2	0	—		1 (Note: Appearance in Hampshire Professional Cup)	1	30	3
Portsmouth	1982–83	Third Division	1	0	0	0	0	0	0	0	1	0
Portsmouth	Total		28	2	2	0	0	0	1	1	31	3
Exeter City (loan)	1982–83	Third Division	7	3	—		—		—		7	3
Reading	1983–84	Fourth Division	45	7	3	0	2	0	1 (Note: Appearances in Football League Trophy)	0	51	7
Reading	1984–85	Third Division	43	7	3	1	2	2	2	0	50	10
Reading	Total		88	14	6	1	4	2	3	0	101	17
Southend United	Total		113	61	4	0	8	4	7	4	132	69
Gillingham	1990–91	Fourth Division	30	12	1	1	0	0	3	1	34	14
Gillingham	1991–92	Fourth Division	37	23	2	0	2	1	2	1	43	25
Gillingham	1992–93	Third Division	20	5	2	2	2	2	0	0	24	9
Gillingham	Total		87	40	5	3	4	3	5	2	101	48
Aylesbury United	1995–96	Isthmian League Premier Division	11	4	—		—		1 (Note: Appearance in Berks & Bucks Senior Cup)	0	12	4
Career total			380	132	20	5	20	10	17	7	437	154

== Honours ==
Southend United

- Football League Fourth Division third-place promotion: 1989–90

Individual

- PFA Football League Fourth Division Team of the Year: 1989–90
- Southend United Player of the Year: 1988–89
