= Gary Johnson (footballer, born 1959) =

English footballer

Personal information
- Full name: Gary Jack Johnson
- Date of birth: 14 September 1959 (age 67)
- Place of birth: Peckham, England
- Height: 5 ft 11 in (1.80 m)
- Position: Forward

Youth career
- 1970–1977: Chelsea

Senior career*
Years	Team	Apps	(Gls)
1977–1980	Chelsea	19	(9)
1980–1983	Brentford	60	(13)
1984–1985	Plate Glass Rangers		
1985–1988	Aldershot	75	(20)
- Leatherhead
Total		154	(42)
- * Club domestic league appearances and goals

Gary Jack Johnson (born 14 September 1959) is an English retired professional footballer who played as a forward in Football League for Aldershot, Brentford and Chelsea. He also played in South Africa.

== Career ==
A forward, Johnson began his career in the Chelsea youth system in 1970. He signed his first professional contract in September 1977 and scored 9 goals in 22 appearances, before his surprise departure to Third Division club Brentford in December 1980. After arriving at Griffin Park in a £30,000 double-deal with Lee Frost, Johnson lacked the pace and presence to establish himself at the club and leg injuries suffered in a car crash during the 1982 off-season effectively ended his career with the club. Johnson was released by Brentford at the end of the 1982–83 season, after making 65 appearances and scoring 14 goals during 2 1/2-years at Griffin Park.

After a spell with Plate Glass Rangers in South Africa, Johnson returned to England to join Fourth Division club Aldershot in August 1985. Over the course of three seasons at the Recreation Ground, Johnson made 75 league appearances and scored 20 goals, in May 1987, Johnson scored the only goal in Aldershot's 1–0 victory over Bolton Wanderers in the first leg of the Football League play-off semi-final and closed out his career in non-League football with Leatherhead.

== Personal life ==
Johnson is a London taxi driver. In December 2016, as the United Kingdom football sexual abuse scandal evolved, Johnson waived his right to anonymity and claimed he had been abused from the age of 13 by Chelsea's then-chief scout, Eddie Heath. It was reported that in July 2015, he had been paid £50,000 by Chelsea not to go public with the allegations. Chelsea apologised "profusely" to Johnson, who demanded further financial compensation from the club.

== Career statistics ==
Appearances and goals by club, season and competition
Club	Season	League			National Cup		League Cup		Other		Total	
Club	Season	Division	Apps	Goals	Apps	Goals	Apps	Goals	Apps	Goals	Apps	Goals
Chelsea	1978–79	First Division	1	1	1	0	0	0	—		2	1
Chelsea	1979–80	Second Division	15	7	1	0	0	0	—		16	7
Chelsea	1980–81	Second Division	3	1	—		1	0	—		4	1
Chelsea	Total		19	9	2	0	1	0	—		22	9
Brentford	1980–81	Third Division	22	5	—		—		—		22	5
Brentford	1981–82	Third Division	30	8	3	0	0	0	—		33	8
Brentford	1982–83	Third Division	8	0	0	0	0	0	2 (Note: Appearances in Football League Group Cup)	1	9	1
Brentford	Total		60	13	3	0	0	0	2	1	65	14
Aldershot	Total		75	20	0	0	0	0	0	0	75	20
Career total			154	42	5	0	1	0	2	1	162	43

== Honours ==
Aldershot

- Football League Fourth Division play-offs: 1987
