= Barry Silkman =

English football player and agent (born 1952)

Personal information
- Full name: Barry Silkman
- Date of birth: 29 June 1952 (age 74)
- Place of birth: Stepney, England
- Height: 5 ft 8 in (1.73 m)
- Position: Midfielder

Youth career
- Queens Park Rangers
- Fulham

Senior career*
Years	Team	Apps	(Gls)
1971–1973	Wimbledon	56	(8)
1973–1974	Barnet	?	(8)
1974–1976	Hereford United	37	(2)
1976–1978	Crystal Palace	48	(6)
1978–1979	Plymouth Argyle	14	(2)
1979	→ Luton Town (loan)	3	(0)
1979–1980	Manchester City	19	(3)
1980	→ Maccabi Tel Aviv (loan)	7	(1)
1980	Brentford	14	(1)
1980–1981	Queens Park Rangers	23	(2)
1981–1985	Leyton Orient	140	(14)
1985–1986	Southend United	40	(1)
1986	Crewe Alexandra	2	(0)
1986–1987	Wycombe Wanderers	6	(0)
1987	Chelmsford City	2	(0)
- Wingate & Finchley

Managerial career
- 2018: Staines Town
- * Club domestic league appearances and goals

Barry Silkman (born 29 June 1952) is a football agent and former player, who played as a midfielder for 11 clubs including at Manchester City in 1979 and at Leyton Orient from 1981 to 1985. He competed for 16 years. In total, he made 340 professional appearances, and scored 31 goals. In the 1990s he became an agent. Metro named him as the 10th-most influential agent in football in 2013.

== Playing career ==
In 1973, to obtain Silkman Barnet offered Wimbledon what was then a record fee for a non-league player, and his earnings rose from £5 a week to £20 a week.

Silkman also played for Hereford United (1974–1976), Crystal Palace (1976–1978), Plymouth Argyle (1978–1979), Luton Town (on loan 1979), Brentford (1980), Queens Park Rangers (1980–1981), Southend United (1985–1986) and Crewe Alexandra (1986). He was also a player-coach at Leyton Orient for three seasons with Frank Clark as manager.

It was at Plymouth that Silkman first came to the attention of Malcolm Allison, who deemed him to be a suitable player to bolster Manchester City's midfield as they struggled in the First Division.

In total, he made 340 professional appearances, and scored 31 goals.

Silkman was a member of the gold-medal winning 45-plus Team GB at the 2009 Maccabiah Games in Israel.

== Managerial career ==
In November 2018, Silkman was briefly appointed manager of Staines Town, before leaving the club due to the Football Association deeming the job to represent a conflict of interests with his work as an agent.

He coached the Team GB 45-plus football squad at the 2013 Maccabiah Games in Israel.

== Agent career ==
After retiring from football, Silkman became an agent. Metro named him as the 10th most influential agent in football in 2013. He said: "It's not the greatest job in the world, and can be very frustrating."

== Personal life ==
Silkman was born in Whitechapel in East London, and brought up in the East End of London. His mother is Ginny. He is Jewish, had a bar mitzvah, and said in 2013: "I was brought up Jewish and I'm Jewish through and through."

He was a student at Canon Barnett Primary and Robert Montefiore Secondary schools.

Silkman has been involved in greyhound training and greyhound racing, with his dogs Half Awake, Skomal and Carlsberg Champ respectively winning the 1987 Gold Collar (Catford), 1988 Guineas (Hackney) and the 1990 Cesarewitch (Belle Vue). He is also involved in horse racing and is a presenter on Racing Post Greyhound TV.

== Career statistics ==
Appearances and goals by club, season and competition
Club	Season	League			FA Cup		League Cup		Other		Total	
Club	Season	Division	Apps	Goals	Apps	Goals	Apps	Goals	Apps	Goals	Apps	Goals
Hereford United	1974–75	Third Division	15	1	0	0	0	0	0	0	15	1
Hereford United	1975–76	Third Division	22	1	2	0	1	0	4 (Note: Appearances in Welsh Cup)	1	29	2
Hereford United	Total		37	2	2	0	1	0	4	1	44	3
Plymouth Argyle	1978–79	Third Division	14	2	1	0	—		—		15	2
Luton Town (loan)	1978–79	Second Division	2	0	—		—		—		2	0
Manchester City	1978–79	First Division	12	3	—		—		—		12	3
Manchester City	1979–80	First Division	7	0	0	0	2	0	—		9	0
Manchester City	Total		19	3	0	0	2	0	—		21	3
Brentford	1980–81	Third Division	14	1	—		2	0	—		16	1
Queens Park Rangers	1980-81	Second Division	23	2	2	0	—		—		25	2
Southend United	1985–86	Fourth Division	40	1	1	0	2	0	0	0	43	1
Wycombe Wanderers	1986–87	Isthmian League Premier Division	6	0	1	0	—		1 (Note: Appearance in Premier Inter-League Cup)	0	8	0
Career total			155	11	7	0	7	0	5	1	174	12

== See also ==
- List of select Jewish association football (soccer) players
