= Terry Hurlock =

English footballer

Personal information
- Full name: Terence Alan Hurlock
- Date of birth: 22 September 1958 (age 68)
- Place of birth: Hackney, England
- Height: 5 ft 9 in (1.75 m)
- Position: Central midfielder

Youth career
- 1974–1979: West Ham United

Senior career*
Years	Team	Apps	(Gls)
1979–	Enfield		
–1980	Leytonstone/Ilford		
1980–1986	Brentford	220	(18)
1986–1987	Reading	29	(0)
1987–1990	Millwall	104	(8)
1990–1991	Rangers	29	(2)
1991–1994	Southampton	59	(2)
1994	Millwall	13	(0)
1994–1995	Fulham	27	(1)
Total		481	(29)

International career
1989	England B	3	(1)
- * Club domestic league appearances and goals

Terence Alan Hurlock (born 22 September 1958) is an English former professional footballer who played as a central midfielder. Over the course of a 15-year career in the Football League, he had notable spells with Brentford and Millwall. He won England B international caps while with Millwall and is a member of the club's Hall of Fame. A physical player, Hurlock received seven red cards during his career and in 2007 was rated by The Times as the 23rd hardest player in football.

== Club career ==
=== Early years ===
Hurlock was born in Hackney and started his football career as an associate schoolboy with West Ham United, becoming an apprentice in April 1975. He failed to progress at West Ham and was released at age 18. Hurlock dropped into non-league football and played for Isthmian League clubs Enfield and Leytonstone/Ilford.

=== Brentford ===
After some attention from AFC Bournemouth manager David Webb, Hurlock joined Third Division club Brentford in August 1980 for a £10,000 fee. He immediately established himself in the midfield alongside Chris Kamara and Stan Bowles, making 42 league appearances and scoring four goals during the 1980–81 season. He flourished under Fred Callaghan's management and averaged over 44 league appearances a season, even after Callaghan was replaced by Frank McLintock. A hard player, Hurlock's long curly hair, earring and beard led the Brentford supporters to nickname him 'Gypo'. Callaghan managed to convince Hurlock to smarten his appearance, as Callaghan believed Hurlock's rough appearance was influencing referees to book him.

Hurlock captained the Bees to the 1985 Football League Trophy Final, which was lost 3–1 to Wigan Athletic. Hurlock departed Brentford in February 1986, having made 263 appearances and scored 24 goals. Looking back in 2002 on his time with the Bees, Hurlock said "I loved my time at the club and living in the town". In a Football League 125th anniversary poll, Hurlock was rated the fifth greatest-ever Brentford player and the club's fifth-greatest captain. In November 2024, Hurlock was inducted into the Brentford Hall of Fame.

=== Reading ===
Hurlock signed for high-flying Third Division club Reading in February 1986 in a £92,000 deal. He made 16 appearances during the remainder of the 1985–86 season and helped the Royals to the Third Division title and to Second Division football for the first time in 55 years. Hurlock's performances saw him named the Third Division PFA Team of the Year. He made 19 appearances in the Second Division before departing Elm Park on 12 February 1987. Hurlock made 35 appearances and scored no goals during his year with Reading. In 2002, Hurlock revealed that he failed to see eye-to-eye with manager Ian Branfoot, as he refused to relocate to Reading from his Brentford home.

=== Millwall ===
Hurlock joined Second Division club Millwall for a £95,000 fee on 12 February 1987 and reunited with former Brentford assistant manager John Docherty, then-manager of the Lions. He made 13 appearances and scored one goal in what remained of the 1986–87 season, before making 33 appearances in the following campaign, helping the Lions to the Second Division championship and to top-flight football for the first time in the club's history. Nicknamed 'Terry Warlock' by the Millwall supporters, Hurlock showed impressive form during the 1988–89 season, making 40 appearances, scoring three goals and winning the club's Player of the Year award. He made a further 37 appearances during the 1989–90 season, a disastrous campaign in which Millwall were relegated back to the Second Division with a bottom-place finish in the First Division. Hurlock departed Millwall on 23 August 1990, having made 123 appearances and scored 10 goals during 3 1/2-years at The Den.

=== Rangers ===
Hurlock moved to Scotland to sign for Scottish League Premier Division club Rangers on 23 August 1990 for a £375,000 fee. In one season at Ibrox, Hurlock made 35 appearances, scored two goals and won Premier Division and League Cup medals.

=== Southampton ===
Hurlock returned to England to sign for First Division club Southampton on 9 September 1991 for a £400,000 fee. He made 36 appearances and scored two goals during the 1991–92 season and was part of the team which reached the 1992 Full Members Cup Final, losing 3–2 to Nottingham Forest after extra time. Hurlock made 33 appearances during the inaugural season of the new Premier League, before falling out of favour the following year departing in February 1994. He made 71 appearances and scored two goals in 2 1/2-years at The Dell.

=== Return to Millwall ===
Hurlock dropped down to the First Division to rejoin high-flying Millwall on 25 February 1994 on a free transfer. He had an ignominious return to action with the Lions, lasting just nine minutes after being the first of three players sent off in a 0–0 draw with Leicester City on 6 March. Hurlock made 15 appearances during what remained of the 1993–94 season, helping the club to a third-place finish and a spot in the playoffs, but his season ended on a sour note after a 5–1 defeat on aggregate to Derby County in the semi-finals. Hurlock departed the club after the season and finished his Millwall career having made 138 appearances and scored 10 goals across his two spells. He is regarded with legend status amongst the Lions supporters and is a member of the club's Hall of Fame.

=== Fulham ===
Hurlock signed for Third Division club Fulham in July 1994. He made 27 league appearances and scored one goal during the 1994–95 season, in which the Cottagers narrowly missed out on a place in the playoffs. Ahead of the 1995–96 season, Hurlock sustained a double leg break at the hands of Brentford defender Martin Grainger in a pre-season friendly between the two clubs. The injury forced him to retire from football at the age of 36. During his one season with Fulham, Hurlock set an unwanted record of 61 disciplinary points.

== International career ==
Hurlock's performances for Millwall in the First Division during the 1988–89 season saw him called into the England B squad for three friendlies in May 1989. He scored on his second appearance, opening the scoring in a 2–0 win over Iceland.

== Personal life ==
During his time with Brentford, Hurlock was convinced by chairman Martin Lange to buy a house next to the club's Griffin Park ground. He was friends with Millwall supporter Bob Crow and has worked for the RMT since 2012.

== Career statistics ==
Appearances and goals by club, season and competition
Club	Season	League			National cup (Note: Includes FA Cup, Scottish Cup)		League cup (Note: Includes EFL Cup, Scottish League Cup)		Other		Total	
Club	Season	Division	Apps	Goals	Apps	Goals	Apps	Goals	Apps	Goals	Apps	Goals
Brentford	1980–81	Third Division	42	4	3	0	—		—		45	4
Brentford	1981–82	Third Division	40	2	3	0	2	0	—		45	2
Brentford	1982–83	Third Division	39	3	3	2	5	1	—		47	6
Brentford	1983–84	Third Division	32	4	4	1	2	0	2 (Note: Appearances in Football League Trophy)	0	40	5
Brentford	1984–85	Third Division	40	3	4	1	4	0	6	0	54	4
Brentford	1985–86	Third Division	27	2	0	0	4	1	1	0	32	5
Brentford	Total		220	18	17	4	17	2	9	0	263	24
Reading	1985–86	Third Division	16	0	—		—		—		16	0
Reading	1986–87	Second Division	13	0	1	0	3	0	2 (Note: Appearances in Full Members Cup)	0	19	0
Reading	Total		29	0	1	0	3	0	2	0	35	0
Millwall	1986–87	Second Division	13	1	—		—		—		13	1
Millwall	1987–88	Second Division	28	4	0	0	4	0	1	0	33	4
Millwall	1988–89	First Division	34	3	1	0	2	0	3	0	40	3
Millwall	1989–90	First Division	29	0	4	0	3	2	1	0	37	2
Millwall	Total		104	8	5	0	9	2	5	0	123	10
Rangers	1990–91	Scottish Premier Division	29	2	2	0	4	0	0	0	35	2
Southampton	1991–92	First Division	27	0	5	0	4	0	6	1	42	1
Southampton	1992–93	Premier League	30	0	0	0	3	0	—		33	0
Southampton	1993–94	Premier League	2	0	0	0	0	0	—		2	0
Southampton	Total		59	0	5	0	7	0	6	1	77	1
Millwall	1993–94	First Division	13	0	—		—		2 (Note: Appearances in First Division play-offs)	0	15	0
Fulham	1994–95	Third Division	27	1	2	0	1	0	0	0	30	1
Career total			481	29	32	4	41	4	24	1	578	38

== Honours ==
Brentford

- Associate Members' Cup runner-up: 1984–85

Reading

- Football League Third Division: 1985–86

Millwall

- Football League Second Division: 1987–88

Rangers

- Scottish League Premier Division: 1990–91
- Scottish League Cup: 1990–91

Southampton

- Full Members Cup runner-up: 1991–92

Individual

- Brentford Supporters' Player of the Year: 1980–81
- Brentford Players' Player of the Year: 1980–81
- Brentford Hall of Fame
- PFA Team of the Year: 1985–86 Third Division
- Millwall Player of the Year: 1988–89
- Millwall Hall of Fame
