= Alan Whitehead (footballer, born 1956) =

English footballer

Personal information
- Date of birth: 20 November 1956 (age 69)
- Place of birth: Bury, England
- Height: 6 ft 3 in (1.91 m)
- Position: Defender

Senior career*
Years	Team	Apps	(Gls)
–	Darwen		
1977–1981	Bury	99	(13)
1981–1984	Brentford	102	(4)
1984	→ Scunthorpe United (loan)	1	(0)
1984–1986	Scunthorpe United	107	(8)
1986–1988	York City	41	(1)
1987	→ Wigan Athletic (loan)	2	(0)
1988–1989	Halifax Town	11	(1)
- * Club domestic league appearances and goals

Alan Whitehead (born 20 November 1956) is an English former professional footballer who made more than 350 appearances in the Football League playing as a central defender for Bury, Brentford, Scunthorpe United, York City, Wigan Athletic, and Halifax Town.

== Early life ==
Whitehead was born in Bury, where he attended the Derby School.

== Career ==
He began his football career with non-League club Darwen before being given his Football League debut for his hometown club Bury by Bob Stokoe while still an amateur, playing at centre forward against Preston North End on Boxing Day 1977 in front of 26,000. He played five games altogether whilst still at college including a League Cup tie against Brian Clough's Nottingham Forest. He went on to play more than 100 times for the club in all competitions including scoring the winning goal in the fourth round of the FA Cup against Burnley. This goal gave the Shakers a plum 5th round tie at Anfield. In 1981, he moved on to Brentford for a club record fee of £78,000 and was their Players' Player of the Year in 1981–82. In early 1984 he joined Scunthorpe United again for a club record fee of £27,000. Scunthorpe became the third consecutive club for which he made more than 100 appearances and he was chosen as their Player of the Season for 1985–86. He left them for York City in late 1986, spending 18 months with the club, including a spell on loan at Wigan Athletic, where he played in a Division Three first leg play-off at Ayresome Park. He then joined Halifax Town, but his career with that club was disrupted by injury, his contract was cancelled by mutual consent, and he returned to York City
