= Fred Callaghan =

English footballer (1944–2022)

Personal information
- Full name: Frederick John Callaghan
- Date of birth: 19 December 1944
- Place of birth: Fulham, England
- Date of death: 13 September 2022 (aged 77)
- Height: 5 ft 10 in (1.78 m)
- Position: Left-back

Youth career
- 1962–1964: Fulham

Senior career*
Years	Team	Apps	(Gls)
1964–1974	Fulham	295	(9)
- Enfield

Managerial career
- Enfield
- 1978–1980: Woking
- 1980–1984: Brentford
- 1992–1993: Basingstoke Town
- 1994–1995: Wealdstone
- 1996: Carshalton Athletic (caretaker)
- * Club domestic league appearances and goals

Frederick John Callaghan (19 December 1944 – 13 September 2022) was an English professional footballer, who made over 290 appearances in the Football League for Fulham as a left back. After retiring as a player, Callaghan became a manager and coach, most notably in the Football League with Brentford. He later had a long career managing and coaching in non-League football.

== Playing career ==
A left back, Callaghan joined First Division club Fulham as an apprentice in 1962 and made his first senior appearances during the 1963–64 season. His debut came in March 1964 during a 2–2 draw away at Aston Villa. As a player, he was described as "a tough-tackling defender who was not averse to crunching tackles and the occasional overlap down the flank" and was nicknamed "The Tank".

By the 1966–67 season, he had broken into the starting lineup on a regular basis, but was part of the team which suffered a double relegation from the First to the Third Division in 1968 and 1969. Callaghan made a career-high 52 appearances during the 1970–71 season and appeared in 45 out of 46 league fixtures, helping the Cottagers to promotion back to the Second Division with a second-place finish. Although not a regular goal scorer, he scored a key goal in the 1971–72 Second Division season, securing a 2–2 draw at Charlton Athletic that saved the club from relegation.

Callaghan made his final appearances for the club during the 1972–73 season and was forced to retire in 1974 due to a back injury. He made 336 appearances for Fulham across all competitions.

== Managerial and coaching career ==
=== Non-League football ===
Callaghan had a long managerial and coaching career in non-League football and held roles at Enfield, Woking, Basingstoke Town, Wealdstone, Carshalton Athletic, Walton & Hersham and Kingstonian.

=== Brentford ===
In February 1977, Callaghan joined Fourth Division club Brentford until the end of the 1976–77 season, as assistant to manager Bill Dodgin Jr. His arrival coincided with the team's sharp upturn in form, which culminated in a run of just two defeats from the final 18 matches of the season, which pulled the club away from the re-election places. After Dodgin Jr. was given a "leave of absence" in March 1980, Callaghan returned to Griffin Park as caretaker manager until the end of the 1979–80 season. After some positive early results, he signed a two-year permanent contract in April 1980 and managed the Bees to an 18th-place finish, clear of the Third Division relegation places.

Callaghan would go on to manage Brentford for 3 1/2 seasons and presided over an overhaul of the squad and coaching structure at Griffin Park. The 1980–81 season saw the arrival of player/assistant manager Ron Harris, a re-formation of the youth setup and the arrivals of Terry Hurlock, David Crown and Gary Roberts. Callaghan added Stan Bowles and Chris Kamara to the midfield during the 1981–82 season and forwards Francis Joseph and Tony Mahoney in 1982–83, but the team's form went into decline during the 1983–84 season and he was sacked in February 1984. Callaghan's three seasons as permanent manager resulted in 9th, 8th and 9th-place finishes respectively in the Third Division.

== Personal life ==
Frederick John Callaghan was born on 19 December 1944 in Parsons Green.

After retiring from football, Callaghan became a London black cab driver. As of August 2012, he was working for former club Fulham as a corporate hospitality host. He died on 13 September 2022 at age 77.

== Career statistics ==
Appearances and goals by club, season and competition
Club	Season	League			FA Cup		League Cup		Total	
Club	Season	Division	Apps	Goals	Apps	Goals	Apps	Goals	Apps	Goals
Fulham	1963–64	First Division	8	0	0	0	0	0	8	0
Fulham	1964–65	First Division	12	0	0	0	2	0	14	0
Fulham	1965–66	First Division	9	0	0	0	0	0	9	0
Fulham	1966–67	First Division	34	3	3	0	3	1	40	4
Fulham	1967–68	First Division	35	0	3	0	6	1	44	1
Fulham	1968–69	Second Division	40	2	2	0	1	0	43	2
Fulham	1969–70	Third Division	28	1	1	0	2	0	31	1
Fulham	1970–71	Third Division	45	0	1	0	6	0	52	0
Fulham	1971–72	Second Division	42	3	3	0	2	0	47	3
Fulham	1972–73	Second Division	38	0	1	0	4	0	43	0
Career total			295	9	14	0	26	2	335	9

== Honours ==
Fulham

- Football League Third Division second-place promotion: 1970–71
