= Lee Frost (footballer) =

English footballer

Personal information
- Full name: Lee Adrian Frost
- Date of birth: 4 December 1957 (age 68)
- Place of birth: Woking, England
- Position: Winger

Youth career
- 1976–1978: Chelsea

Senior career*
Years	Team	Apps	(Gls)
1978–1980	Chelsea	17	(5)
1978	→ Brentford (loan)	6	(0)
1980	→ MYPA (loan)	12	(3)
1980–1981	Brentford	15	(3)
- Addlestone & Weybridge Town
1983–1984	Salisbury		(8)
1984–1985	Crawley Town	2	(0)
- * Club domestic league appearances and goals

Lee Adrian Frost (born 4 December 1957) is an English retired professional footballer who played as a winger in the Football League for Chelsea and Brentford.

== Career ==
=== Chelsea ===
A winger, Frost began his career in the youth system at Second Division club Chelsea, signing his first professional contract in July 1976. He had to wait until 15 April 1978 to make his first-team debut, which came with a start in a 2–0 First Division defeat to Aston Villa. Frost joined newly promoted Third Division club Brentford on a one-month loan in October 1978. He made six appearances without scoring before his loan expired.

Chelsea's relegation at the end of the 1978–79 season opened up a place in the team and he made his first appearance of 1979–80 on 20 October 1979. He scored his first senior goal as 10-man Chelsea beat Cardiff City 2–1. Frost made a name for himself on his following appearance, scoring a hat-trick in a win over Orient on 10 November and following up with another goal in a 2–1 victory over West Ham United. He made semi-regular appearances through to March 1980 and finished the 1979–80 season with five goals in 12 appearances. Frost moved to Finland to join 1. Divisioona club MYPA on loan during the 1980 season. He scored three goals for the club.

Frost made his first appearance of the 1980–81 season on 3 September 1980, with a start in a 1–1 League Cup second-round second-leg draw with Cardiff City. It proved to be his final appearance for the club and he departed in December 1980, having made 18 appearances and scored five goals during just under two and a half years in the first-team squad at Stamford Bridge.

=== Brentford ===
Frost and Chelsea teammate Gary Johnson joined Brentford permanently in a £15,000 deal in December 1980. Frost scored three goals in 15 appearances before his release at the end of the 1980–81 season.

=== Non-League football ===
After his release from Brentford, Frost dropped into non-League football and played for Southern League clubs Addlestone & Weybridge Town, Salisbury and Crawley Town.

== Career statistics ==
Appearances and goals by club, season and competition
Club	Season	League			FA Cup		League Cup		Other		Total	
Club	Season	Division	Apps	Goals	Apps	Goals	Apps	Goals	Apps	Goals	Apps	Goals
Chelsea	1977–78	First Division	1	0	0	0	0	0	—		1	0
Chelsea	1978–79	First Division	3	0	0	0	0	0	—		3	0
Chelsea	1979–80	Second Division	10	5	0	0	0	0	—		10	5
Chelsea	1980–81	Second Division	0	0	0	0	1	0	—		1	0
Chelsea	Total		14	5	0	0	1	0	—		15	5
Brentford (loan)	1978–79	Third Division	6	0	—		—		—		6	0
Brentford	1980–81	Third Division	15	3	—		—		—		15	3
Brentford	Total		21	3	—		—		—		21	3
Crawley Town	1984–85	Southern League Premier Division	2	0	0	0	—		1 (Note: 1 appearance in Southern League Cup)	0	3	0
Career total			37	8	0	0	1	0	1	0	39	8
