= 1976–77 Brentford F.C. season =

English football team season

Brentford
1976–77 season
- Chairman: Dan Tana
- Manager: John Docherty (until 7 September 1976); Eddie Lyons (7–16 September 1976); Bill Dodgin Jr. (from 16 September 1976)
- Stadium: Griffin Park
- Fourth Division: 15th
- FA Cup: Second round
- League Cup: First round
- Top goalscorer: League: Sweetzer (23); All: Sweetzer (23)
- Highest home attendance: 8,951
- Lowest home attendance: 3,158
- Average home league attendance: 5,121
Home colours	Away colours

During the 1976–77 English football season, Brentford competed in the Football League Fourth Division. After a poor start to the season, Bill Dodgin Jr. appointed to replace inexperienced manager John Docherty. With re-election looking likely, Dodgin overhauled the playing squad and the Bees won 14 of the final 18 matches of the season to complete a remarkable turnaround and finish in mid-table.

== Season summary ==
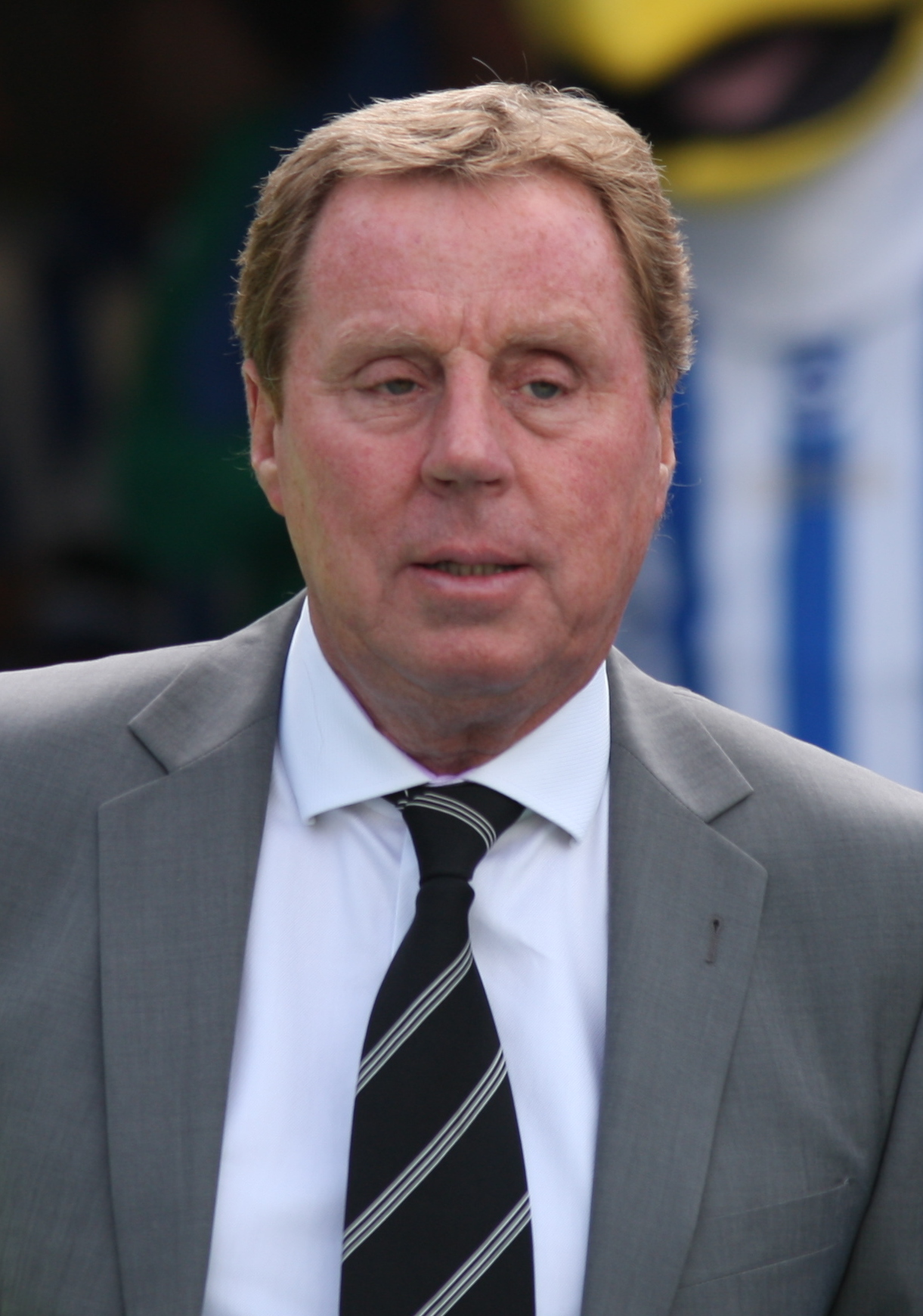
Winger Harry Redknapp made one appearance while on trial in September 1976.

After Brentford's lowest-ever finish in the Fourth Division at the end of the previous season, manager John Docherty released defenders Alan Nelmes and Keith Lawrence and replaced them with John Fraser and Bobby Goldthorpe respectively. Also arriving at Griffin Park were defender Keith Pritchett and midfielder Steve Aylott, while teenagers Danis Salman, Gary Rolph, Graham Cox and Paul Walker all signed apprentice professional contracts. A catalogue of injuries to Fraser, Aylott, Riddick, Sweetzer, McCulloch, Allen and Johnson and a failure to win any of the first six games of the season led to manager Docherty quitting the club, after failing to win a vote of confidence from chairman Dan Tana. Physiotherapist Eddie Lyons was put in caretaker charge of the team for one match before Bill Dodgin Jr. was appointed manager on 16 September 1976, who followed in his father's footsteps by taking over the role.

While Brentford were entrenched in the re-election places the first five months of Bill Dodgin Jr.'s reign, behind the scenes he overhauled the squad and sought players who would meld with his attacking philosophy. Between September 1976 and February 1977, Dodgin brought in midfielder Dave Carlton from his previous club Northampton Town and a number of players on loan – goalkeeper Tony Burns and midfielders Allan Glover, Steve Scrivens, Neil Smillie and John Bain. The sales of defender Keith Pritchett and forwards Roger Cross and Micky French generated over £20,000 in transfer fees, a small portion of which was spent on midfielders Paul Shrubb and Steve Phillips. Most significantly, teenage forward Gordon Sweetzer was promoted through the ranks and began to establish himself in the starting lineup in the New Year.

By January 1977, manager Dodgin's new-look squad was starting to produce results on the field, with Gordon Sweetzer scoring a hat-trick in a 4–0 victory over Stockport County in the middle of the month. In late February, Brentford set off on a run which would see the club become one of the Fourth Division's form teams, winning 14 and drawing two of the final 18 matches of the season. Gordon Sweetzer established a strike partnership with fit-again Andrew McCulloch and showed prolific form, finishing the season with 23 goals from 28 appearances. In March, despite a shaky start, the £20,000 purchase of central defender Pat Kruse would prove to be an important signing for the future. Brentford finished the season in 15th place.

Two club records were set during the season:

- Youngest debutant: Paul Walker, 15 years, 7 months, 28 days (versus Watford, League Cup first round, 14 August 1976)
- Youngest FA Cup goalscorer: Gary Rolph – 16 years, 9 months, 26 days (versus Colchester United, FA Cup second round, 20 December 1976)

== League table ==
Pos	Team	Pld	W	D	L	GF	GA	GD	Pts
13	Bournemouth	46	15	18	13	54	44	+10	48
14	Stockport County	46	13	19	14	53	57	−4	45
15	Brentford	46	18	7	21	77	76	+1	43
16	Torquay United	46	17	9	20	59	67	−8	43
17	Aldershot	46	16	11	19	49	59	−10	43

== Results ==
Brentford's goal tally listed first.

=== Legend ===
Win	Draw	Loss

=== Pre-season ===
Date	Opponent	Venue	Result	Scorer(s)
2 August 1976	Walton	A	1–1	Sweetzer
9 August 1976	Hayes	A	1–3	Cross
12 August 1976	Addlestone	A	2–4	Cross, Walker

=== Football League Fourth Division ===
No.	Date	Opponent	Venue	Result	Attendance	Scorer(s)
1	21 August 1976	Barnsley	H	0–1	3,903	
2	23 August 1976	Stockport County	A	0–2	3,191	
3	28 August 1976	Huddersfield Town	A	0–1	4,559	
4	4 September 1976	Doncaster Rovers	H	2–2	3,804	Johnson, French
5	10 September 1976	Aldershot	A	1–1	5,129	French
6	18 September 1976	Southport	H	3–0	4,185	Graham, Johnson, Cross
7	25 September 1976	Torquay United	A	1–1	2,456	Cross
8	2 October 1976	Bradford City	A	2–3	4,809	Cross (2)
9	9 October 1976	Newport County	H	1–1	5,894	Goldthorpe
10	15 October 1976	Swansea City	A	3–5	3,656	Allen, Pritchett, Goldthorpe
11	23 October 1976	Darlington	H	0–3	4,303	
12	25 October 1976	Workington	H	5–0	3,158	Cross, Sweetzer, McCulloch (2), Fraser
13	30 October 1976	Colchester United	A	1–2	3,607	Cross
14	3 November 1976	Exeter City	A	2–3	2,779	McCulloch, Graham
15	6 November 1976	Bournemouth	H	3–2	4,254	Cross, French, McCulloch
16	13 November 1976	Hartlepool	A	0–2	1,888	
17	27 November 1976	Cambridge United	H	0–2	5,040	
18	27 December 1976	Southend United	A	1–2	9,239	Cross (pen)
19	1 January 1977	Bournemouth	A	1–3	4,268	Cross
20	3 January 1977	Colchester United	H	1–4	4,629	McCulloch
21	8 January 1977	Crewe Alexandra	A	2–3	2,198	McCulloch, Sweetzer
22	15 January 1977	Stockport County	H	4–0	3,981	Fraser, Sweetzer (3)
23	22 January 1977	Barnsley	A	0–2	4,095	
24	25 January 1977	Scunthorpe United	A	1–2	2,867	Sweetzer
25	29 January 1977	Halifax Town	H	2–1	4,517	Sweetzer, French
26	5 February 1977	Huddersfield Town	H	1–3	4,833	Salman
27	12 February 1977	Doncaster Rovers	A	0–5	4,095	
28	19 February 1977	Aldershot	H	0–1	4,542	
29	22 February 1977	Rochdale	H	3–2	3,307	Johnson, Phillips, Sweetzer
30	5 March 1977	Torquay United	H	3–2	4,172	Sweetzer (3, 1 pen)
31	8 March 1977	Southport	A	2–1	969	Johnson (pen), Sweetzer
32	12 March 1977	Bradford City	H	4–0	5,742	Shrubb, Johnson, Bain, Phillips
33	18 March 1977	Newport County	A	1–3	1,747	Sweetzer
34	23 March 1977	Watford	H	3–0	7,602	Sweetzer (2), Graham
35	26 March 1977	Swansea City	H	4–0	6,201	Johnson (2, 1 pen), Sweetzer, Phillips
36	2 April 1977	Darlington	A	2–2	1,681	Johnson, Sweetzer
37	8 April 1977	Southend United	H	1–0	8,951	Phillips
38	9 April 1977	Watford	A	1–0	9,382	McCulloch
39	12 April 1977	Exeter City	H	1–0	7,641	Sweetzer
40	16 April 1977	Workington	A	3–1	1,032	Sweetzer, McCulloch, Phillips
41	19 April 1977	Halifax Town	A	0–0	1,464	
42	23 April 1977	Hartlepool	H	3–1	5,978	Kruse, McCulloch, Sweetzer (pen)
43	30 April 1977	Cambridge United	A	2–3	5,617	Sweetzer, Graham
44	2 May 1977	Crewe Alexandra	H	0–0	5,842	
45	7 May 1977	Scunthorpe United	H	4–2	5,298	Kruse, Sweetzer (2), Phillips
46	14 May 1977	Rochdale	A	3–2	977	Shrubb, McCulloch, Phillips

=== FA Cup ===
Round	Date	Opponent	Venue	Result	Attendance	Scorer(s)
1R	20 November 1976	Chesham United	H	2–0	5,633	French, Cross
2R	20 December 1976	Colchester United	A	2–3	4,730	Rolph, Fraser

=== Football League Cup ===
Round	Date	Opponent	Venue	Result	Attendance	Scorer
1R (1st leg)	14 August 1976	Watford	A	1–1	4,827	Cross
1R (2nd leg)	17 August 1976	Watford	H	0–2 (lost 3–1 on aggregate)	5,542	

- Sources: 100 Years of Brentford, The Big Brentford Book of the Seventies, Statto

== Playing squad ==
Players' ages are as of the opening day of the 1976–77 season.

Pos.	Name	Nat.	Date of birth (age)	Signed from	Signed in	Notes
Goalkeepers
GK	Graham Cox	(England)	30 April 1959 (aged 17)	Youth	1975	
GK	Paul Priddy	(England)	11 January 1953 (aged 23)	Walton & Hersham	1975	
Defenders
DF	Michael Allen	(England)	30 March 1949 (aged 27)	Middlesbrough	1971	
DF	Steve Aylott	(England)	3 September 1951 (aged 24)	Oxford United	1976	
DF	John Fraser	(England)	12 July 1953 (aged 23)	Fulham	1976	
DF	Bobby Goldthorpe	(England)	6 December 1950 (aged 25)	Charlton Athletic	1976	
DF	Pat Kruse	(England)	30 November 1953 (aged 22)	Torquay United	1977	
DF	Danis Salman	(England)	12 March 1960 (aged 16)	Youth	1975	
DF	Tom Sharp	(Scotland)	30 July 1957 (aged 19)	Everton	1976	
DF	Nigel Smith	(England)	3 July 1958 (aged 18)	Queens Park Rangers	1975	
Midfielders
MF	John Bain	(Scotland)	3 June 1957 (aged 19)	Bristol City	1977	On loan from Bristol City
MF	Dave Carlton	(England)	24 November 1952 (aged 23)	Northampton Town	1976	
MF	Jackie Graham (c)	(Scotland)	16 July 1946 (aged 30)	Guildford City	1970	
MF	Terry Johnson	(England)	30 August 1949 (aged 26)	Southend United	1974	
MF	Steve Phillips	(England)	4 August 1954 (aged 22)	Northampton Town	1977	
MF	Paul Shrubb	(England)	1 August 1955 (aged 21)	Hellenic	1977	
MF	Paul Walker	(England)	17 December 1960 (aged 15)	Youth	1976	Loaned to Slough Town
Forwards
FW	Andrew McCulloch	(England)	3 January 1950 (aged 26)	Oxford United	1976	
FW	Gary Rolph	(England)	24 February 1960 (aged 16)	Youth	1976	
FW	Gordon Sweetzer	(Canada)	27 January 1957 (aged 19)	Queens Park Rangers	1975	
Players who left the club mid-season
GK	Tony Burns	(England)	27 March 1944 (aged 32)	Crystal Palace	1977	Returned to Crystal Palace after loan
DF	Paul Bence	(England)	21 December 1948 (aged 27)	Reading	1970	Loaned to Torquay United, released
DF	Keith Pritchett	(Scotland)	8 November 1953 (aged 22)	Queens Park Rangers	1976	Transferred to Watford
DF	Gordon Riddick	(England)	6 November 1943 (aged 32)	Northampton Town	1973	Released
MF	Allan Glover	(England)	21 October 1950 (aged 25)	West Bromwich Albion	1976	Returned to West Bromwich Albion after loan
MF	Harry Redknapp	(England)	2 March 1947 (aged 29)	Bournemouth	1976	Released
MF	Terry Scales	(England)	18 January 1951 (aged 25)	West Ham United	1971	Released
MF	Steve Scrivens	(England)	11 March 1957 (aged 19)	Fulham	1976	Returned to Crystal Palace after loan
MF	Neil Smillie	(England)	19 July 1958 (aged 18)	Crystal Palace	1977	Returned to Crystal Palace after loan
FW	Roger Cross	(England)	20 October 1948 (aged 27)	Fulham	1973	Transferred to Millwall
FW	Micky French	(England)	7 May 1955 (aged 21)	Queens Park Rangers	1975	Transferred to Swindon Town

- Sources: The Big Brentford Book of the Seventies, Timeless Bees

== Coaching staff ==
=== John Docherty (14 August – 7 September 1976) ===
Name	Role
(Scotland) John Docherty	Manager
(England) Eddie Lyons	Physiotherapist
(England) Bob Pearson	Chief Scout

=== Eddie Lyons (7 – 16 September 1976) ===
Name	Role
(England) Eddie Lyons	Caretaker Manager
(England) Bob Pearson	Chief Scout

=== Bill Dodgin Jr. (16 September 1976 – 14 May 1977) ===
Name	Role
(England) Bill Dodgin Jr.	Manager
(England) Fred Callaghan	Assistant manager
(England) Eddie Lyons	Physiotherapist
(England) Gordon Quinn	Chief Scout

== Statistics ==
=== Appearances and goals ===
Substitute appearances in brackets.

Pos	Nat	Name	League		FA Cup		League Cup		Total	
Pos	Nat	Name	Apps	Goals	Apps	Goals	Apps	Goals	Apps	Goals
GK	(England)	Graham Cox	3	0	0	0	0	0	3	0
GK	(England)	Paul Priddy	37	0	2	0	2	0	41	0
DF	(England)	Michael Allen	40	1	2	0	0	0	42	1
DF	(England)	Steve Aylott	5	0	0	0	0	0	5	0
DF	(England)	Paul Bence	10 (1)	0	—		2	0	11 (1)	0
DF	(England)	John Fraser	39	2	2	1	0	0	41	3
DF	(England)	Bobby Goldthorpe	19	2	1 (1)	0	2	0	22 (1)	2
DF	(England)	Pat Kruse	15	2	—		—		15	2
DF	(Scotland)	Keith Pritchett	11	1	—		2	0	13	1
DF	(England)	Gordon Riddick	15	0	2	0	0	0	17	0
DF	(England)	Danis Salman	16 (2)	1	1 (1)	0	2	0	19 (3)	1
DF	(Scotland)	Tom Sharp	2 (2)	0	0	0	0 (1)	0	2 (3)	0
DF	(England)	Nigel Smith	32 (2)	0	0	0	2	0	34 (2)	0
MF	(England)	Dave Carlton	31 (1)	0	2	0	—		33 (1)	0
MF	(Scotland)	Jackie Graham	42	4	2	0	2	0	46	4
MF	(England)	Terry Johnson	24 (3)	8	1	0	0	0	25 (3)	8
MF	(England)	Steve Phillips	19	7	—		—		19	7
MF	(England)	Harry Redknapp	1	0	—		—		1	0
MF	(England)	Terry Scales	12	0	1	0	2	0	15	0
MF	(England)	Paul Shrubb	10 (3)	2	—		—		10 (3)	2
MF	(England)	Paul Walker	1 (1)	0	1	0	2	0	4 (1)	0
FW	(England)	Roger Cross	21	9	2	1	2	1	25	11
FW	(England)	Micky French	15 (4)	4	2	1	2	0	19 (4)	5
FW	(England)	Andrew McCulloch	18 (2)	10	0	0	0	0	18 (2)	10
FW	(England)	Gary Rolph	6 (1)	0	1	1	0	0	7 (1)	1
FW	(Canada)	Gordon Sweetzer	25 (2)	23	1	0	0	0	26 (2)	23
Players loaned in during the season
GK	(England)	Tony Burns	6	0	—		—		6	0
MF	(Scotland)	John Bain	17 (1)	1	—		—		17 (1)	1
MF	(England)	Allan Glover	6	0	—		—		6	0
MF	(England)	Steve Scrivens	5	0	—		—		5	0
MF	(England)	Neil Smillie	3	0	—		—		3	0

- Players listed in italics left the club mid-season.
- Source: 100 Years of Brentford

=== Goalscorers ===
Pos.	Nat	Player	FL4	FAC	FLC	Total
FW	(Canada)	Gordon Sweetzer	23	0	0	23
FW	(England)	Roger Cross	9	1	1	11
FW	(England)	Andrew McCulloch	10	0	0	10
MF	(England)	Terry Johnson	8	0	0	8
MF	(England)	Steve Phillips	7	—	—	7
FW	(England)	Micky French	4	1	0	5
MF	(Scotland)	Jackie Graham	4	0	0	4
DF	(England)	John Fraser	2	1	0	3
DF	(England)	Pat Kruse	2	—	—	2
MF	(England)	Paul Shrubb	2	—	—	2
DF	(England)	Bobby Goldthorpe	2	0	0	2
MF	(Scotland)	John Bain	1	—	—	1
DF	(England)	Michael Allen	1	0	0	1
DF	(Scotland)	Keith Pritchett	1	0	0	1
DF	(England)	Danis Salman	1	0	0	1
FW	(England)	Gary Rolph	0	1	0	1
Total			77	4	1	82

- Players listed in italics left the club mid-season.
- Source: 100 Years of Brentford

=== Management ===
Name	Nat	From	To	Record All Comps					Record League				
Name	Nat	From	To	P	W	D	L	W %	P	W	D	L	W %
John Docherty	(Scotland)	14 August 1976	7 September 1976	6	0	2	4	0.00	4	0	1	3	0.00
Eddie Lyons (caretaker)	(England)	7 September 1976	16 September 1976	1	0	1	0	0.00	1	0	1	0	0.00
Bill Dodgin, Jr.	(England)	16 September 1976	14 May 1977	43	19	5	19	44.19	41	18	5	18	43.90

=== Summary ===
Games played	50 (46 Fourth Division, 2 FA Cup, 2 League Cup)
Games won	19 (18 Fourth Division, 1 FA Cup, 0 League Cup)
Games drawn	8 (7 Fourth Division, 0 FA Cup, 1 League Cup)
Games lost	23 (21 Fourth Division, 1 FA Cup, 1 League Cup)
Goals scored	82 (77 Fourth Division, 4 FA Cup, 1 League Cup)
Goals conceded	82 (76 Fourth Division, 3 FA Cup, 3 League Cup)
Clean sheets	12 (11 Fourth Division, 1 FA Cup, 0 League Cup)
Biggest league win	5–0 versus Workington, 25 October 1976
Worst league defeat	5–0 versus Doncaster Rovers, 12 February 1977
Most appearances	46, Jackie Graham (42 Fourth Division, 2 FA Cup, 2 League Cup)
Top scorer (league)	23, Gordon Sweetzer
Top scorer (all competitions)	23, Gordon Sweetzer

== Transfers & loans ==
Players transferred in
Date	Pos.	Name	Previous club	Fee	Ref.
July 1976	DF	(England) Steve Aylott	(England) Oxford United	Free	
July 1976	DF	(England) John Fraser	(England) Fulham	Free	
July 1976	DF	(England) Bobby Goldthorpe	(England) Fulham	Free	
July 1976	DF	(Scotland) Keith Pritchett	(England) Queens Park Rangers	Free	
September 1976	MF	(England) Harry Redknapp	(England) Bournemouth	Trial	
October 1976	MF	(England) Dave Carlton	(England) Northampton Town	£3,000	
October 1976	DF	(England) Gordon Riddick	Unattached	Non-contract	
1976	FW	(England) Gary Rolph	n/a	n/a	
February 1977	MF	(England) Steve Phillips	(England) Northampton Town	£4,000	
February 1977	MF	(England) Paul Shrubb	(South Africa) Hellenic	n/a	
March 1977	DF	(England) Pat Kruse	(England) Torquay United	£20,000	
Players loaned in
Date from	Pos.	Name	From	Date to	Ref.
October 1976	MF	(England) Allan Glover	(England) West Bromwich Albion	November 1976	
December 1976	MF	(England) Steve Scrivens	(England) Fulham	January 1977	
January 1977	GK	(England) Tony Burns	(England) Crystal Palace	February 1977	
January 1977	MF	(England) Neil Smillie	(England) Crystal Palace	February 1977	
February 1977	MF	(Scotland) John Bain	(England) Bristol City	End of season	
Players transferred out
Date	Pos.	Name	Subsequent club	Fee	Ref.
November 1976	DF	(Scotland) Keith Pritchett	(England) Watford	£4,000	
20 January 1977	FW	(England) Roger Cross	(England) Millwall	£9,500	
24 February 1977	FW	(England) Micky French	(England) Swindon Town	£7,000	
Players loaned out
Date from	Pos.	Name	To	Date to	Ref.
November 1976	DF	(England) Paul Bence	(England) Torquay United	January 1977	
April 1977	MF	(England) Paul Walker	(England) Slough Town	End of season	
Players released
Date	Pos.	Name	Subsequent club	Join date	Ref.
September 1976	DF	(England) Gordon Riddick	Retired		
October 1976	MF	(England) Harry Redknapp	(United States) Seattle Sounders	1976	
February 1977	DF	(England) Gordon Riddick	(England) Wealdstone	1977	
March 1977	DF	(England) Paul Bence	(England) Wokingham Town	1977	
March 1977	MF	(England) Terry Scales	(England) Dagenham	1977	
May 1977	DF	(England) Bobby Goldthorpe	(England) Hayes	1977	
May 1977	GK	(England) Paul Priddy	(England) Tooting & Mitcham United	1977	
May 1977	DF	(Scotland) Tom Sharp	n/a	n/a	

== Awards ==
- Supporters' Player of the Year: Gordon Sweetzer
- Players' Player of the Year: Jackie Graham
