= South London derby =

Football rivalries in London

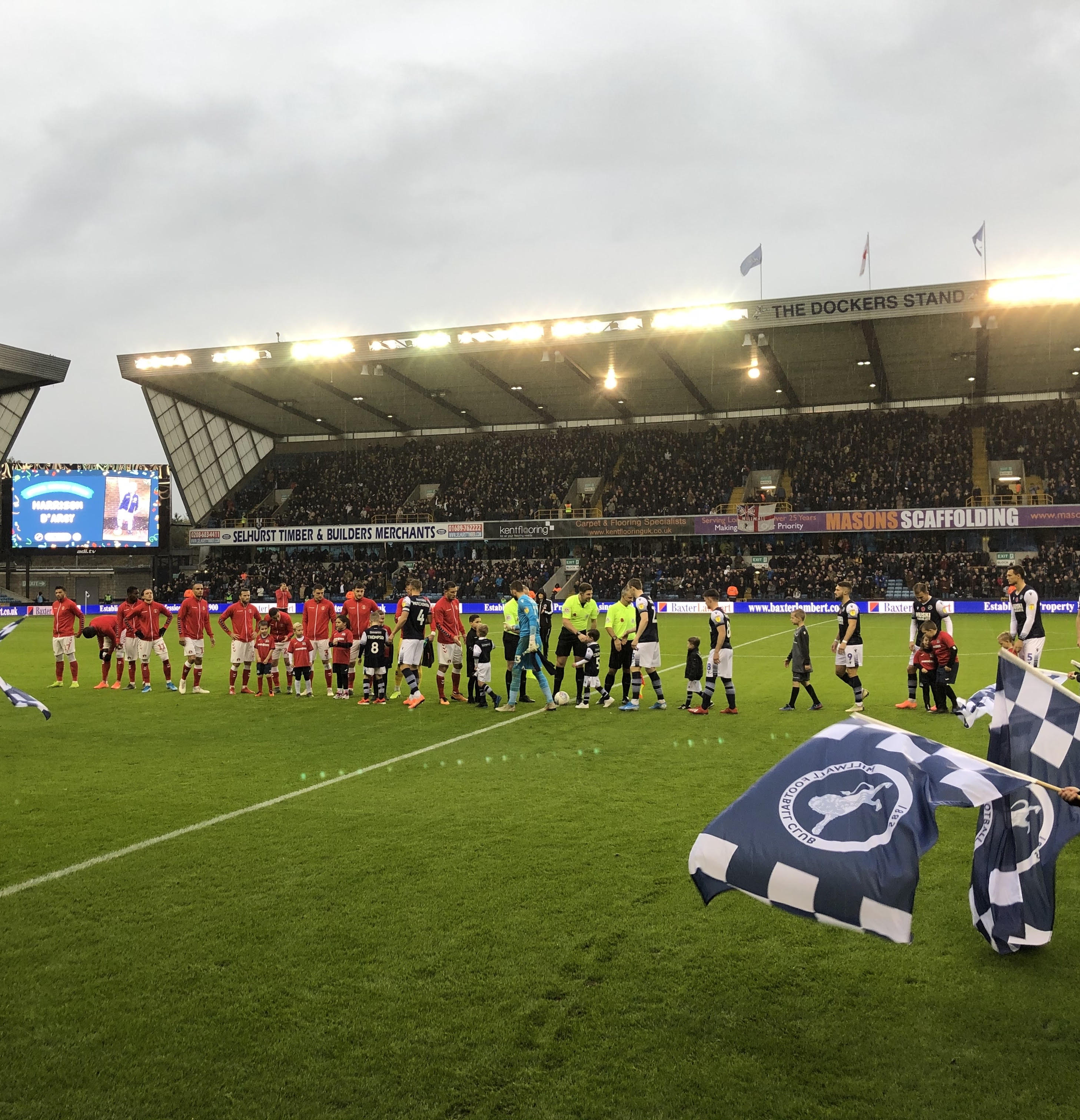
- Millwall and Charlton shake hands before kick-off at The Den in November 2019.
- Location: South London, England
- Teams: AFC Wimbledon; Bromley; Charlton Athletic; Crystal Palace; Millwall; Sutton United
- First meeting: Millwall 0–3 Crystal Palace (Note: The first true South London derby was played on 31 October 1910, a 3–0 win for Palace at Millwall's new ground based in New Cross, The Den. The first ever meeting between the sides was on 17 November 1906, another 3–0 win for Palace. The Lions were still based in East London at that time, and did not move to South London until 1910.) (PFA Charity Fund, 31 October 1910)
- Latest meeting: Bromley 0–2 AFC Wimbledon (EFL League One, 7 September 2026)
- Next meeting: Charlton v Millwall (EFL Championship, 19 December 2026)
- Stadiums: The Den; Hayes Lane; Plough Lane; Selhurst Park; The Valley

Statistics
- Total meetings: 339 (Note: 64 games played between 1980 and 2004 by now-dissolved club Wimbledon F.C. against Charlton, Crystal Palace and Millwall have not been included in this total. Wimbledon won 25, lost 23 and drew 17 games against their South London rivals. All games played by AFC Wimbledon are included in this total.) (Note: Only first-team games are included in Sutton's total. Sutton's 3–0 win in the Football League trophy on 31 August 2021 against Crystal Palace U21s is not counted, as Palace fielded their academy and not a first-team squad.)
- Most wins: Millwall (97)
- All-time series: Millwall: W97 D74 L73; Crystal Palace: W82 D52 L69; Charlton Athletic: W51 D53 L84; AFC Wimbledon: W10 D6 L15; Bromley: W2 D0 L3; Sutton United: W5 D1 L3
- Largest victory: Millwall 6–0 Charlton Athletic (Second Division, 3 January 1931)

The South London derby is the name given to a football derby contested by any two of AFC Wimbledon, Bromley, Charlton Athletic, Crystal Palace and Millwall – the five English professional Football Association clubs that play in the Football League in South London. A sixth club, Sutton United, is also located in South London but currently do not compete in the Football League. The close geographical proximity of all the teams contributes significantly to the rivalries.

Charlton and Millwall are located in south-east London, with Millwall's The Den in New Cross and Charlton's The Valley in Greenwich being less than four miles apart. Crystal Palace are based further south in the suburb of Selhurst, their stadium Selhurst Park being six miles from The Den and eight from The Valley. AFC Wimbledon are located at Plough Lane in Merton, south-west London, which is five miles west of Selhurst Park, eight from The Den and ten from The Valley. Bromley's Hayes Lane in Bromley is over nine miles east from Plough Lane, four and half miles east of Selhurst Park and seven miles south of The Den and The Valley.

According to a 2013 fan survey on football rivalries, Charlton considers their main rival to be Crystal Palace, with Millwall second. Millwall's main rivalry is with East London club West Ham United, with Palace placed second and Charlton third. Crystal Palace fans consider their main rival to be Brighton, with Millwall second and Charlton third. AFC Wimbledon's main rivalry is with Milton Keynes Dons, with their fans considering Crawley Town their second-biggest rival.

Palace was first founded in 1861 but folded in 1876, Millwall was founded in 1885, twenty-years later Charlton was founded in 1905, with Palace being refounded the same year. The earliest fixture between two of the teams was in 1906 when Crystal Palace and Millwall first met in the Southern League. The two teams have contested the most games, over 130 derbies. Palace and Millwall both entered the Football League in the 1920–21 season. Charlton joined the next year in the 1921–22 season, playing in the same division as Palace and Millwall for the first time. Wimbledon were founded in 1889 and spent the majority of their history as an amateur club, until joining the Football League in the 1977–78 season. In 2003 Wimbledon were relocated to Milton Keynes as part of a franchise takeover and reformed it into a new club called Milton Keynes Dons. During this period of decline, the club was refounded as a phoenix club in 2002, created by supporters against the move, renaming itself AFC Wimbledon, as it won a rapid succession of non-League promotions to gain Football League status nine years later. AFC Wimbledon played their first derby in 2009, an FA Cup game against Millwall.

Sutton United were founded in 1898 but only played their first competitive derby in 2017, an FA Cup game against AFC Wimbledon. Sutton gained promotion into the English Football League for the first time in the 2020–21 season. They competed in League Two for three seasons, playing seven derbies against Wimbledon and Charlton, before being relegated back to the National League in 2024. Bromley were founded in 1892 and played their entire history in non-league, until winning promotion from the National League in the Play-off Final in 2024.

Millwall hold a winning record over Charlton, Palace, and Wimbledon. Wimbledon and Crystal Palace both have winning records against Charlton but have yet to play a game against each other. Charlton hold a losing record against all three. Bromley won their first South London derby in the Football League against Wimbledon, and have lost two cup games against Wimbledon and Charlton. As of the 2026–27 season, Crystal Palace play in the Premier League, Millwall and Charlton play in the Championship, and Bromley and AFC Wimbledon play in League One.

== History ==
=== Early rivalries ===
The five South London Football League teams.

Millwall were founded in 1885, some 20 years before Charlton Athletic and Crystal Palace, who were both founded in 1905. Soon after Crystal Palace were formed, they joined the Southern Football League, of which Millwall were founding members. The two teams played against each other for ten seasons in this league. The first contested competitive game between the sides was played on 17 November 1906, with Palace winning 3–0 although the fixture was not yet a South London derby – Millwall were based in East London until 1910. Up until that point the most successful team based in South London was Woolwich Arsenal, who were the first Southern member elected to the Football League in 1893.

Charlton Athletic's early years were somewhat hindered by the presence of Woolwich Arsenal, who were the closest team in locality and were well supported. Charlton spent the first years of their history playing in non-professional leagues and did not play either Palace or Millwall. Eventually, Woolwich Arsenal moved to North London, losing the 'Woolwich' from their name, in 1913. The same year Charlton adopted senior status. They became a professional team in 1920, joining the Southern League. Both Millwall and Crystal Palace joined the Football League in the 1920–21 season, playing in the Third Division, while Charlton Athletic joined the year after for the 1921–22 season, finally competing at the same level as both their South London neighbours. Wimbledon became a Football League club five decades later in the 1977–78 season, playing their first South London derby against Millwall in 1980.

=== Four in the same league ===
There have been two occasions where four of the current five South London teams have played in the same league together. In the 1985–86 season, Charlton Athletic, Crystal Palace, Millwall and Wimbledon all competed in the Second Division. Charlton finished 2nd and Wimbledon 3rd, both being automatically promoted. Palace finished 5th and Millwall 9th. The 1989–90 season signifies the only time all four teams competed in the First Division together, the top tier of English football. Wimbledon finished the season 8th, Palace 15th and Charlton and Millwall were relegated, finishing 19th and 20th respectively.

=== Ground sharing ===
During World War II Millwall's ground The Den was severely damaged by a German bomb and a fire destroyed a stand a few days later. For a brief time the club was invited by their neighbours to play their games at The Valley and Selhurst Park. In 1984 Charlton went into administration. The club were forced to leave The Valley just after the start of the 1985–86 season after its safety was criticised by league officials. The club began a groundshare with Crystal Palace at Selhurst Park, which lasted for six years until 1991. After another year groundsharing at West Ham United's Upton Park, Charlton moved back into The Valley in 1992. Wimbledon groundshared at Selhurst Park from 1991 until their relocation to Milton Keynes in 2003. The campaign of Wimbledon's fans against the relocation led to the formation of AFC Wimbledon.

== Notable matches ==
- Crystal Palace 3–0 Millwall Athletic (17 November 1906)

The first meeting between any of the three original teams saw Palace, who were only formed a year prior, secure a comfortable victory over the visitors from East London. It was a Southern League match watched by 6,000 fans at the Crystal Palace National Sports Centre.

- Millwall 0–3 Crystal Palace (31 October 1910)

This was the first game between the teams since Millwall moved to South London (in 1910), making this the first true South London derby. 3,000 supporters watched a Palace victory at The Den in a London PFA Charity Fund game. The match against their new neighbours was Millwall's second game at their new ground.

- Millwall 0–1 Crystal Palace (15 January 1921)

First derby contested in The Football League. Palace won the Third Division game with a second half goal in front of 20,000 fans. Palace also won the reverse fixture 3–2 which was held only a week later on 22 January 1921, to complete the first South London Football League double and continue their early dominance of Millwall.

- Millwall 2–0 Charlton Athletic (10 October 1921)

This London PFA Charity Fund fixture was the first contest between the two teams, which Millwall won 2–0 in front of 10,000 supporters at The Den.

- Millwall 0–1 Charlton Athletic (31 December 1921)

On New Year's Eve of 1921 the teams met for their first League match, which Charlton won 1–0 at The Den. This was Charlton's first season as a Football League club and they completed a rare double over Millwall, winning the return fixture at The Valley 2–1.

- Charlton Athletic 1–1 Crystal Palace (14 November 1925)

The first competitive game played between the teams took place in the Third Division (south), and ended with a 1–1 draw at The Valley.

- Millwall 6–0 Charlton Athletic (3 January 1931)

This Second Division game between the sides remains the widest winning margin between any of the clubs. Millwall led 1–0 at half-time and scored five more times in the second half, with goals from Harold Wadsworth (2), Joe Readman (2), Andrew Swallow and Jack Landells.

- Millwall 2–2 Wimbledon (5 April 1980)

Wimbledon's first South London Derby was away at Millwall in the Third Division. The game ended in a draw in front of a crowd of 5,364. This was the Wombles third season as a Football League club, they finished bottom of the table and were relegated.

- Wimbledon 0–3 Crystal Palace (4 May 1991)

The last South London derby and last ever game at Plough Lane. Wimbledon were forced to move at the end of the season due to a new FA rule requiring all-seater stadiums. They started ground-sharing with Palace at Selhurst Park the following season. Palace won the game with a hat-trick by Ian Wright in the second half. Palace finished 3rd and Wimbledon 7th in the 1990–91 First Division.

- Charlton Athletic 1–3 Crystal Palace (aggregate score, 12 & 15 May 1996)

Crystal Palace and Charlton met in the 1996 First Division play-off semi-final, after they finished third and sixth in the league respectively. Palace won the first leg at The Valley 2–1, and 1–0 in the second leg three days later. Palace went on to lose the play-off final to Leicester City 1–2 at Wembley.

- Wimbledon 0–1 Millwall (24 March 2004)

A crowd of just 3,043 at the National Hockey Stadium in Milton Keynes saw Wimbledon's last game against South London opponents before they were renamed as MK Dons. A goal in the first half from Tim Cahill was enough to seal a win for Millwall against a Wimbledon side that finished bottom of the First Division and were relegated.

- Charlton Athletic 2–2 Crystal Palace (15 May 2005)

Palace led 2–1 with seven minutes left to play, before Charlton defender Jonathan Fortune scored an equaliser in the final game of the season, relegating Palace from the Premier League. Had Palace held on to win, they would have finished above West Brom and avoided relegation, but instead became the first club to be relegated from the top-flight of English football four times. The 2004–05 season was the only time Charlton and Palace played in the Premier League together.

- Millwall 4–1 AFC Wimbledon (9 November 2009)

AFC Wimbledon's first competitive South London derby was a match against Millwall at The Den in the first round of the FA Cup. Kenny Jackett's League One side won 4–1 against the Conference National side.

- Charlton Athletic 4–4 Millwall (19 December 2009)

The first meeting of the sides since the last meeting back on 9 March 1996 ended in the highest-scoring game between the teams. Millwall went 2–0 up through two Steve Morison goals but Charlton converted two penalties through Deon Burton. Millwall's Jimmy Abdou was sent off early in the second half and The Lions went twice behind to the home team but Danny Schofield scored a last-minute equaliser. Both teams wore special kits for the match in honour of murdered local teenagers and supporters Jimmy Mizen and Rob Knox. The logos of both clubs' shirt sponsors were replaced by the text, "Street violence ruins lives".

- Charlton Athletic 1–2 AFC Wimbledon (17 September 2016)

AFC Wimbledon's first win in a south London derby. Also their first derby in the Football League, with their two previous derbies against Millwall being losses in cup competitions. Wimbledon came from a goal down to win, with a Tyrone Barnett goal in the 85th minute.

- Charlton Athletic 0–1 Millwall (3 July 2020)

First South East London derby League game to be played with no fans present and in the summer. The game was re-arranged from 4 April due to the Coronavirus pandemic. The game was won in the 81st minute with a goal by Jake Cooper.

- AFC Wimbledon 2–2 Charlton Athletic (20 March 2021)

AFC Wimbledon's first south London derby at their new Plough Lane ground. No fans were present due to the Coronavirus pandemic. Charlton led twice through goals from Jayden Stockley and Diallang Jaiyesimi. A brace from Ryan Longman made sure Wimbledon earned a point in their battle against relegation, and denting Charlton's play-off push. Wimbledon were 23rd and Charlton 6th in the table at the end of the game.

- Sutton United 0–0 AFC Wimbledon (7 January 2017)

First competitive South West London derby for Sutton United was an FA Cup Third round match against AFC Wimbledon at Gander Green Lane. The game ended in a goalless draw, with Sutton winning the replay 3–1.

- AFC Wimbledon 0–1 Sutton United (15 October 2022)

Sutton United's first ever South West London derby in a league game was an away win at Plough Lane, with captain Craig Eastmond scoring the only goal of the game in the 30th minute, securing Sutton's first away win of the season.

- Charlton Athletic 1–1 Cray Valley Paper Mills (5 November 2023)

Cray Valley Paper Mills are a non-league team, playing in the Isthmian League, the eighth tier of the football league. Their first ever competitive South London derby was a game against Charlton in the First round of the FA Cup. Both teams play in Greenwich, making it a South East London derby. The game ended in a shock 1–1 draw at the Valley. In the replay at the Badgers Sports Ground in Eltham, Charlton won 6–1.

- Bromley 1–2 AFC Wimbledon (13 August 2024)

Bromley's first ever South London derby was a First Round League Cup game against Wimbledon. Levi Amantchi gave Bromley the lead, but goals from Josh Kelly and Joe Pigott knocked Bromley out.

- Bromley 2–0 AFC Wimbledon (17 August 2024)

Bromley's first ever home game in the Football League was against their South London rivals Wimbledon. Goals from Michael Cheek and Corey Whitely gave them their first ever home win in the League and first South London derby win at Hayes Lane.

== Bromley v Charlton Athletic ==
The sides first competitive game was in the EFL Trophy at The Valley, in 2024.

=== By competition ===
As of 12 November 2024

Competition	Played	Bromley wins	Drawn	Charlton wins	Bromley goals	Charlton goals
Football League Trophy	1	0	0	1	0	1
Total	1	0	0	1	0	1

=== Full list of results ===
Score lists home team first.

Date	Score	Winner	Competition	Venue	Attendance	Notes
12 November 2024	1–0	Charlton	EFL Trophy	The Valley	2,916	First competitive game between the sides, group stage.

== Bromley v AFC Wimbledon ==
The sides first competitive game was in the League Cup at Hayes Lane, in 2024.

=== By competition ===
As of 7 September 2026

Competition	Played	Bromley wins	Drawn	AFC Wimbledon wins	Bromley goals	AFC Wimbledon goals
Football League	3	2	0	1	3	2
League Cup	1	0	0	1	1	2
Total	4	2	0	2	4	4

=== Full list of results ===
Score lists home team first.

Date	Score	Winner	Competition	Venue	Attendance	Notes
13 August 2024	1–2	Wimbledon	League Cup	Hayes Lane	3,677	First ever competitive meeting; First round.
17 August 2024	2–0	Bromley	League Two	Hayes Lane	4,102	First ever South London derby win for Bromley. First league meeting.
1 March 2025	0–1	Bromley	League Two	Plough Lane	8,519	First league double for Bromley.
7 September 2026	0–2	Wimbledon	League One	Hayes Lane		
13 February 2027	–		League One	Plough Lane		

== Charlton Athletic v Crystal Palace ==
Rivalry strength as described by fans in 2012

Charlton and Crystal Palace first met in 1925 in the Third Division (South), with the match ending in a 1–1 draw. Palace dominated their first 20 meetings, winning 13, and losing only four. Palace have completed the league double over Charlton six times, in 1926–27, 1927–28, 1964–65, 1968–69, 1989–90, and 2012–13. Charlton have done it twice, in 1999–2000 and 2007–08. Palace's longest unbeaten run in the fixture is nine games between 1993 and 1996, where they won six and drew three, including knocking their rivals out of the 1996 First Division Play-offs. Charlton's best unbeaten run is four games (three wins and a draw) twice, between 1982–83 and 2004–08.

=== By competition ===
As of 23 September 2015

Competition	Played	Charlton wins	Drawn	Palace wins	Charlton goals	Palace goals
Football League	56	17	13	26	55	78
FA Cup	2	1	1	0	2	0
League Cup	6	0	1	5	5	13
Anglo-Italian Cup	1	1	0	0	4	1
Full Members Cup	1	0	0	1	0	2
Football League play-offs	2	0	0	2	1	3
Total	68	19	15	34	67	97

This table only includes competitive first team games, excluding all pre-season games, friendlies, abandoned matches, testimonials and games played during World War I & II.

=== Full list of results ===
Score lists home team first.

Date	Score	Winner	Competition	Venue	Attendance	Notes
14 November 1925	1–1	Draw	Third Division (South)	The Valley		First competitive game.
27 March 1926	4–1	Palace	Third Division (South)	Selhurst Park		First Palace win.
4 September 1926	1–2	Palace	Third Division (South)	The Valley		First Palace away win.
22 January 1927	2–1	Palace	Third Division (South)	Selhurst Park		League double (1st for Crystal Palace)
5 November 1927	5–0	Palace	Third Division (South)	Selhurst Park		Biggest winning margin for Palace.
17 March 1928	0–4	Palace	Third Division (South)	The Valley		League double (2nd for Crystal Palace)
20 October 1928	0–2	Charlton	Third Division (South)	Selhurst Park		First Charlton win (and Charlton away win)
2 March 1929	1–3	Palace	Third Division (South)	The Valley		
23 September 1933	4–2	Charlton	Third Division (South)	The Valley		
1 February 1934	1–0	Palace	Third Division (South)	Selhurst Park		
6 October 1934	2–2	Draw	Third Division (South)	The Valley		
16 February 1935	1–2	Charlton	Third Division (South)	Selhurst Park		
15 September 1964	1–2	Palace	Second Division	The Valley		First game against each other in 29 years (longest period)
30 September 1964	3–1	Palace	Second Division	Selhurst Park		League double (3rd for Crystal Palace)
2 October 1965	2–0	Palace	Second Division	Selhurst Park		
26 March 1966	1–0	Charlton	Second Division	The Valley		
10 September 1966	1–1	Draw	Second Division	The Valley		
14 January 1967	1–0	Palace	Second Division	Selhurst Park		
9 September 1967	3–0	Palace	Second Division	Selhurst Park		
5 March 1968	0–1	Palace	Second Division	The Valley		League double (4th for Crystal Palace)
31 August 1968	3–3	Draw	Second Division	Selhurst Park		
4 January 1969	0–0	Draw	FA Cup	The Valley		Third round.
8 January 1969	0–2	Charlton	FA Cup	Selhurst Park		Third round replay
22 March 1969	1–1	Draw	Second Division	The Valley		
30 November 1974	2–1	Palace	Third Division	Selhurst Park		
17 January 1975	1–0	Charlton	Third Division	The Valley		
29 October 1977	1–1	Draw	Second Division	Selhurst Park		
24 March 1978	1–0	Charlton	Second Division	The Valley		
27 March 1979	1–1	Draw	Second Division	The Valley		
17 April 1979	1–0	Palace	Second Division	Selhurst Park		
12 September 1981	2–0	Palace	Second Division	Selhurst Park	14,227	
6 February 1982	2–1	Charlton	Second Division	The Valley	9,072	
27 December 1982	1–1	Draw	Second Division	Selhurst Park	17,996	
4 April 1983	2–1	Charlton	Second Division	The Valley	7,836	
27 December 1983	1–0	Charlton	Second Division	The Valley	10,224	
23 April 1984	2–0	Palace	Second Division	Selhurst Park	7,818	
26 December 1984	2–1	Palace	Second Division	Selhurst Park	9,540	
6 April 1985	1–1	Draw	Second Division	The Valley	6,131	
20 August 1985	1–2	Palace	League Cup	The Valley		First round, 1st leg
3 September 1985	1–1	Draw	League Cup	Selhurst Park		First round, 2nd leg. Palace win 3–1 on aggregate.
7 September 1985	3–1	Charlton	Second Division	The Valley	6,637	Last game at The Valley between the sides until 1993.
11 January 1986	2–1	Palace	Second Division	Selhurst Park	11,521	
16 December 1989	1–2	Palace	First Division	Selhurst Park	15,763	First 'home' game against Palace since Charlton began groundsharing at Selhurst Park.
19 December 1989	2–0	Palace	Full Members' Cup	Selhurst Park	6,621	Third round.
21 April 1990	2–0	Palace	First Division	Selhurst Park	15,276	League double (5th for Crystal Palace)
7 September 1993	4–1	Charlton	Anglo-Italian Cup	The Valley	3,868	Qualifying round. First game at The Valley between the sides since Charlton returned in 1992.
21 September 1993	3–1	Palace	League Cup	Selhurst Park	9,615	Second round, 1st leg.
26 September 1993	0–0	Draw	Division One	The Valley	7,947	
5 October 1993	0–1	Palace	League Cup	The Valley	5,224	Second round, 2nd leg. Palace win 4–1 on aggregate.
20 March 1994	2–0	Palace	Division One	Selhurst Park	14,408	Fifth game of the season between the teams (3 cup, 2 league)
26 August 1995	1–1	Draw	Division One	Selhurst Park	14,092	
4 February 1996	0–0	Draw	Division One	The Valley	13,535	
12 May 1996	1–2	Palace	Football League play-offs	The Valley	14,618	Semi-final, 1st leg
15 May 1996	1–0	Palace	Football League play-offs	Selhurst Park	22,880	Semi-final, 2nd leg. Palace win 3–1 on aggregate.
21 December 1996	1–0	Palace	Division One	Selhurst Park	17,401	Palace nine games unbeaten (longest streak)
8 March 1997	2–1	Charlton	Division One	The Valley	14,816	
26 December 1999	2–1	Charlton	Division One	The Valley	20,043	
25 March 2000	0–1	Charlton	Division One	Selhurst Park	22,577	League double (1st for Charlton). First Charlton win at Selhurst Park since 1969.
27 October 2004	1–2	Palace	League Cup	The Valley	19,030	Third round.
5 December 2004	0–1	Charlton	Premier League	Selhurst Park	20,705	First Premier League meeting between the two sides.
15 May 2005	2–2	Draw	Premier League	The Valley	26,870	Palace relegated
1 September 2007	0–1	Charlton	Championship	Selhurst Park	18,556	
8 February 2008	2–0	Charlton	Championship	The Valley	26,202	League double (2nd for Charlton). Charlton seven league games unbeaten (best streak)
30 September 2008	1–0	Palace	Championship	Selhurst Park	16,358	
27 January 2009	1–0	Charlton	Championship	The Valley	20,627	
14 September 2012	0–1	Palace	Championship	The Valley	21,730	
2 February 2013	2–1	Palace	Championship	Selhurst Park	17,945	League double (6th for Crystal Palace)
23 September 2015	4–1	Palace	League Cup	Selhurst Park	16,576	Third round, Dwight Gayle scored a 27-minute hat-trick.

== Charlton Athletic v Millwall ==
The teams first met in 1921, with Charlton winning at The Den 1–0. They won the return fixture at The Valley 2–1, completing the first Football League double over their local rivals. Millwall hold the record for the longest unbeaten run between the teams at 14 games. Between 1922 and 1930, the Lions won eight and drew six. Charlton's longest unbeaten run against Millwall is six games, between 1934 and 1968 they won three and drew three. The longest period the clubs have gone without playing each other is 31 years (between the 1935–36 and 1965–66 seasons), due to being in different leagues. Millwall also have a run of 12 games unbeaten between 1979 and 1992, where they won six and drew six. Millwall have completed a League double over Charlton ten times (in 1923–24, 1924–25, 1931–32, 1932–33, 1968–69, 1970–71, 1971–72, 1988–89, 1992–93 and 2019–20) compared to Charlton's three (in 1921–22, 1934–35 and 1995–96). Millwall have the most consecutive wins in the derby with five (twice). Charlton has won two games in a row (four times). The teams didn't play each other for 13 years, competing in different leagues between the 1996–97 and 2008–09 seasons. Millwall are currently on a fourteen-game unbeaten streak against Charlton (their joint-longest), with eight wins and six draws spanning 30 years (1996–2026). Many Millwall fans do not consider Charlton a serious rival due to the one-sided nature of the contest. The Lions have won 38 (50%) of the 76 league fixtures between the teams spanning 105 years, with the Addicks only winning 11 games (14%).

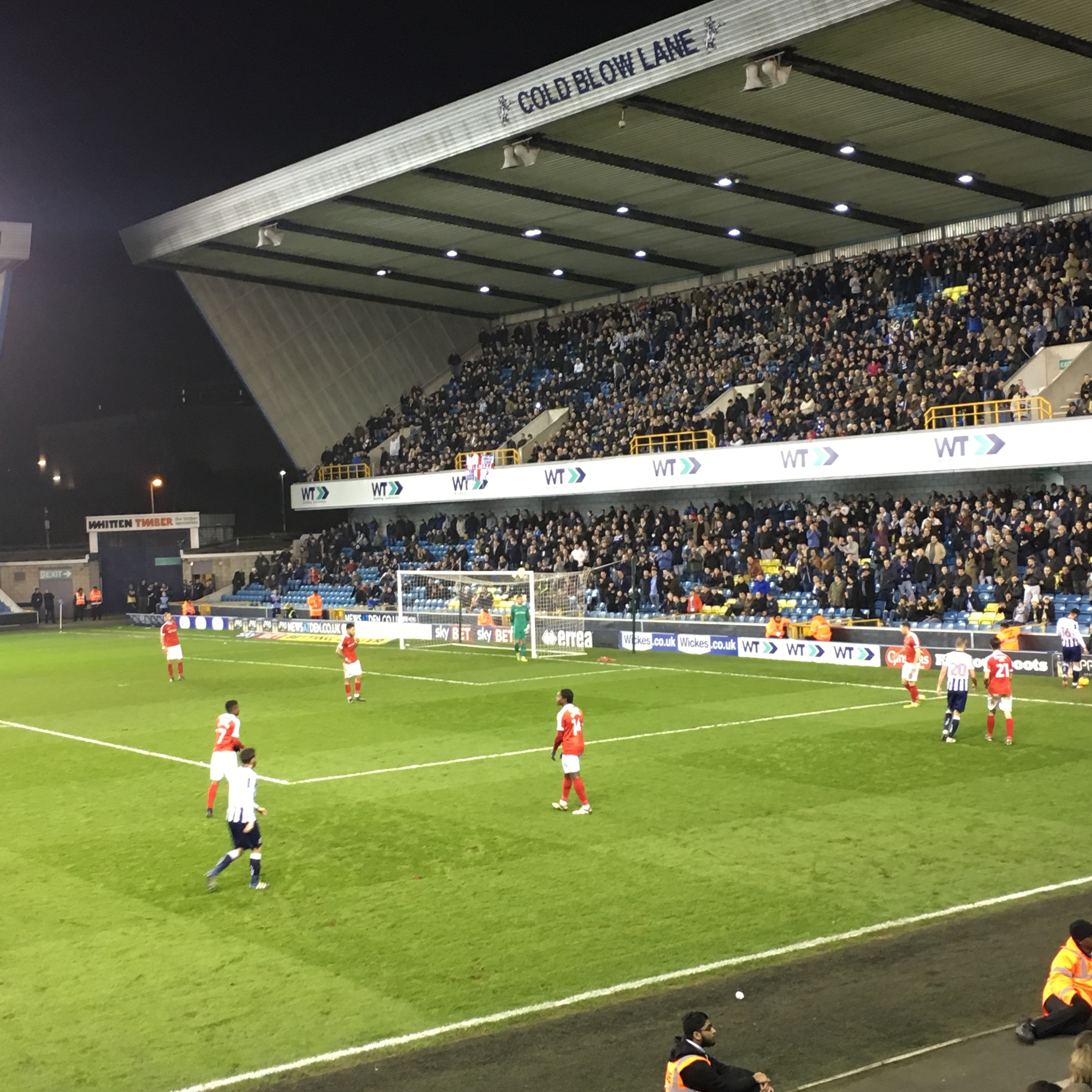
Millwall and Charlton playing at The Den in December, 2016.

=== By competition ===
As of 24 January 2026.

Competition	Played	Charlton wins	Drawn	Millwall wins	Charlton goals	Millwall goals
Football League	76	11	27	38	66	124
Anglo-Italian Cup	2	1	1	0	4	3
Sub-total	78	12	28	38	70	127
Kent FA Challenge Cup finals	18	9	5	4	36	31
London Challenge Cup	1	1	0	0	1	0
Football League Jubilee Fund	2	1	1	0	2	1
London PFA Charity Fund	5	2	1	2	7	5
Total	104	25	35	44	116	164

This table only includes competitive first-team games, excluding all pre-season games, friendlies, abandoned matches, testimonials and games played during the First and Second World Wars.

=== Full list of results ===
Score lists home team first.

Date	Score	Winner	Competition	Venue	Attendance	Notes	H2H
31 December 1921	0–1	Charlton	Third Division (South)	The Den	25,000	First competitive game, first Charlton win.	+1
14 January 1922	2–1	Charlton	Third Division (South)	The Valley	18,000	League double (1st for Charlton)	+2
4 November 1922	1–1	Draw	Third Division (South)	The Den	25,000		+2
11 November 1922	0–2	Millwall	Third Division (South)	The Valley	18,000	First Millwall win.	+1
22 September 1923	0–1	Millwall	Third Division (South)	The Valley	15,000		0
29 September 1923	1–0	Millwall	Third Division (South)	The Den	14,000	League double (1st for Millwall)	+1
10 April 1925	0–2	Millwall	Third Division (South)	The Valley	25,000		+2
13 April 1925	1–0	Millwall	Third Division (South)	The Den	12,000	League double (2nd for Millwall)	+3
3 October 1925	1–1	Draw	Third Division (South)	The Den	25,337		+3
13 February 1926	1–4	Millwall	Third Division (South)	The Valley	22,000		+4
25 September 1926	3–0	Millwall	Third Division (South)	The Den	20,239		+5
12 February 1927	1–1	Draw	Third Division (South)	The Valley	20,000		+5
8 October 1927	1–1	Draw	Third Division (South)	The Valley	27,212		+5
18 February 1928	5–0	Millwall	Third Division (South)	The Den	25,498		+6
5 October 1929	1–1	Draw	Second Division	The Den	32,218		+6
8 February 1930	1–1	Draw	Second Division	The Valley	35,000	Highest attendance, Millwall 14 games unbeaten (joint-longest streak)	+6
6 September 1930	2–0	Charlton	Second Division	The Valley	22,000		+5
3 January 1931	6–0	Millwall	Second Division	The Den	14,687	Largest winning margin in a South London derby.	+6
10 October 1931	1–3	Millwall	Second Division	The Valley	25,000		+7
20 February 1932	1–0	Millwall	Second Division	The Den	17,381	League double (3rd for Millwall)	+8
12 November 1932	2–1	Millwall	Second Division	The Den	13,908		+9
25 March 1933	1–4	Millwall	Second Division	The Valley	33,000	League double (4th for Millwall)	+10
29 September 1934	3–1	Charlton	Third Division (South)	The Valley	25,725		+9
9 February 1935	1–3	Charlton	Third Division (South)	The Den	29,263	Football League double (2nd for Charlton)	+8
27 August 1966	0–0	Draw	Second Division	The Den	20,364	First game in 31 years, longest period without meeting.	+8
31 December 1966	0–0	Draw	Second Division	The Valley	29,529		+8
2 September 1967	0–0	Draw	Second Division	The Den	18,240		+8
6 January 1968	1–0	Charlton	Second Division	The Valley	24,092	Charlton six games unbeaten, their longest streak.	+7
10 August 1968	3–4	Millwall	Second Division	The Valley	27,504	First win in the fixture (and at The Valley) for 35 years.	+8
1 March 1969	3–2	Millwall	Second Division	The Den	23,011	League double (5th for Millwall)	+9
16 August 1969	1–1	Draw	Second Division	The Den	20,451		+9
7 October 1969	2–2	Draw	Second Division	The Valley	21,718		+9
5 September 1970	1–3	Millwall	Second Division	The Valley	15,867		+10
27 March 1971	2–0	Millwall	Second Division	The Den	13,399	League double (6th for Millwall)	+11
30 August 1971	2–1	Millwall	Second Division	The Den	18,588		+12
25 April 1972	0–2	Millwall	Second Division	The Valley	26,582	Derek Possee scores 8th goal against Charlton, League double (7th for Millwall)	+13
27 December 1976	1–1	Draw	Second Division	The Den	20,914		+13
8 April 1977	3–2	Charlton	Second Division	The Valley	16,481		+12
24 September 1977	1–1	Draw	Second Division	The Den	13,309		+12
28 February 1978	0–2	Millwall	Second Division	The Valley	15,671		+13
28 October 1978	0–2	Charlton	Second Division	The Den	10,054	First win at The Den for 43 years.	+12
10 March 1979	2–4	Millwall	Second Division	The Valley	9,908		+13
6 September 1980	2–0	Millwall	Third Division	The Den	6,895	Lowest league attendance recorded.	+14
17 March 1981	0–0	Draw	Third Division	The Valley	12,700		+14
29 March 1986	2–2	Draw	Second Division	The Den	20,451		+14
15 April 1986	3–3	Draw	Second Division	Selhurst Park	21,718	Charlton were groundsharing with Crystal Palace at Selhurst Park.	+14
10 September 1988	0–3	Millwall	First Division	Selhurst Park	13,735	First meeting between the teams in the top flight.	+15
2 January 1989	1–0	Millwall	First Division	The Den	17,025	League double (8th for Millwall)	+16
22 August 1989	2–2	Draw	First Division	The Den	14,806		+16
8 December 1989	1–1	Draw	First Division	Selhurst Park	11,017		+16
22 September 1990	0–0	Draw	Second Division	Selhurst Park	10,970	Keith Stevens (Millwall) was sent-off.	+16
10 April 1991	3–1	Millwall	Second Division	The Den	15,382	Sheringham scores a hat-trick, taking his tally to 5 goals in the derby.	+17
26 February 1992	1–0	Millwall	Second Division	The Den	12,882	Millwall 12 games unbeaten (their third longest streak)	+18
7 March 1992	1–0	Charlton	Second Division	Upton Park	8,177	Charlton were groundsharing with West Ham at Upton Park.	+17
2 September 1992	1–2	Charlton	Anglo-Italian Cup	The Den	3,975	Lowest attendance recorded, first cup tie between the sides. 90th-minute winner by Alan Pardew.	+16
18 October 1992	0–2	Millwall	Division One	Upton Park	7,527	First and only Football League win at Upton Park for Millwall.	+17
25 April 1993	1–0	Millwall	Division One	The Den	10,159	Last derby at The Old Den, league double (9th for Millwall).	+18
1 September 1993	2–2	Draw	Anglo-Italian Cup	The Den	4,003	First game between the teams at The New Den.	+18
11 September 1993	0–0	Draw	Division One	The Valley	8,413	First derby at The Valley since Charlton returned home. Alex Rae (Millwall) sent-off.	+18
15 March 1994	2–1	Millwall	Division One	The Den	13,320		+19
1 January 1995	1–1	Draw	Division One	The Valley	10,655		+19
8 April 1995	3–1	Millwall	Division One	The Den	9,506		+20
5 December 1995	0–2	Charlton	Division One	The Den	11,350	Lee Bowyer (Charlton) and Keith Stevens (Millwall) were sent-off in the snow.	+19
9 March 1996	2–0	Charlton	Division One	The Valley	12,204	League double (3rd for Charlton).	+18
19 December 2009	4–4	Draw	League One	The Valley	19,105	Highest ever scoring game in the fixture. Jimmy Abdou (Millwall) was sent-off.	+18
13 March 2010	4–0	Millwall	League One	The Den	17,632		+19
1 December 2012	0–0	Draw	Championship	The Den	18,013		+19
16 March 2013	0–2	Millwall	Championship	The Valley	18,514		+20
13 September 2013	0–1	Millwall	Championship	The Valley	15,917		+21
15 March 2014	0–0	Draw	Championship	The Den	16,102		+21
22 November 2014	0–0	Draw	Championship	The Valley	16,102		+21
8 April 2015	2–1	Millwall	Championship	The Den	15,917	Chris Solly (Charlton) was sent-off. 87th-minute winner by Jos Hooiveld.	+22
21 December 2016	3–1	Millwall	League One	The Den	14,395	Morison scores his 5th and 6th goals against Charlton in the derby.	+23
14 January 2017	0–0	Draw	League One	The Valley	15,315	Jorge Teixeira (Charlton) was sent-off.	+23
9 November 2019	2–1	Millwall	Championship	The Den	17,109	91st-minute winner by Matt Smith.	+24
3 July 2020	0–1	Millwall	Championship	The Valley	0	League double (10th for Millwall). Game was re-arranged from 4 April due to Coronavirus pandemic. Game was played behind closed doors.	+25
13 September 2025	1–1	Draw	Championship	The Valley	23,393	Kayne Ramsay sent-off for Charlton. Largest attendance since 1972.	+25
24 January 2026	4–0	Millwall	Championship	The Den	19,004	Millwall 14 games unbeaten (their joint-longest streak). Largest League attendance at The ‘New’ Den.	+26
19 December 2026	–		Championship	The Den			
3 April 2027	–		Championship	The Valley			

== Charlton Athletic v Sutton United ==
The sides first competitive game was in the EFL trophy at the Valley, in 2023.

=== By competition ===
As of 21 November 2023

Competition	Played	Charlton wins	Drawn	Sutton wins	Charlton goals	Sutton goals
Football League Trophy	1	1	0	0	3	0
Total	1	1	0	0	3	0

== Charlton Athletic v AFC Wimbledon ==
Charlton and AFC Wimbledon first met in 2016, after Wimbledon were promoted via the League Two playoffs and Charlton were relegated from the Championship. Wimbledon won their first ever meeting at The Valley 2–1. Charlton won only one of their first six meetings, with Wimbledon knocking Charlton out of the FA Cup in 2017 and Football League Trophy on penalties in 2018. Charlton completed the double over their local rivals in the 2018–19 season. Charlton hold their only superior record (in the league) in South London derbies, with Wimbledon dominating cup competitions, having won all four cup games.

=== By competition ===
As of 5 April 2022

Competition	Played	Charlton wins	Drawn	AFC Wimbledon wins	Charlton goals	AFC Wimbledon goals
Football League	10	5	3	2	18	12
FA Cup	1	0	0	1	1	3
League Cup	1	0	0	1	0	1
Football League Trophy	2	0	0	2	3	4
Total	14	5	3	6	22	20

=== Full list of results ===
Score lists home team first.

Date	Score	Winner	Competition	Venue	Attendance	Notes
17 September 2016	1–2	Wimbledon	League One	The Valley	11,927	First ever league meeting, first Wimbledon win in a South London derby.
11 February 2017	1–1	Draw	League One	Kingsmeadow	4,595	
28 October 2017	1–0	Charlton	League One	The Valley	12,575	First South London derby win in 15 games (since a victory against Palace in 2009).
3 December 2017	3–1	Wimbledon	FA Cup	Kingsmeadow	3,270	Second round.
12 April 2018	1–0	Wimbledon	League One	Kingsmeadow	4,457	
4 September 2018	2–2 (Note: AFC Wimbledon won 4–2 on penalties)	Wimbledon	Football League Trophy	The Valley	1,244	Group stage, Wimbledon won 4–2 on penalties.
15 December 2018	2–0	Charlton	League One	The Valley	10,691	
23 February 2019	1–2	Charlton	League One	Kingsmeadow	4,532	League double (1st for Charlton)
1 September 2020	2–1	Wimbledon	Football League Trophy	Loftus Road	0	Group stage. Played behind closed doors due to Coronavirus pandemic, and at temporary venue pending completion of Plough Lane.
12 December 2020	5–2	Charlton	League One	The Valley	2,000	Restricted admittance due to UK COVID-19 regulations.
20 March 2021	2–2	Draw	League One	Plough Lane	0	First South London derby at Wimbledon's new ground. No fans present due to Coronavirus pandemic.
10 August 2021	0–1	Wimbledon	League Cup	The Valley	3,372	First round.
5 February 2022	3–2	Charlton	League One	The Valley	22,486	
5 April 2022	1–1	Draw	League One	Plough Lane	8,184	First derby at the new Plough Lane with fans present.

=== Full list of results ===
Score lists home team first.

Date	Score	Winner	Competition	Venue	Attendance	Notes
21 November 2023	3–0	Charlton	EFL Trophy	The Valley	1,377	First competitive game between the sides, group stage.

== Crystal Palace v Millwall ==
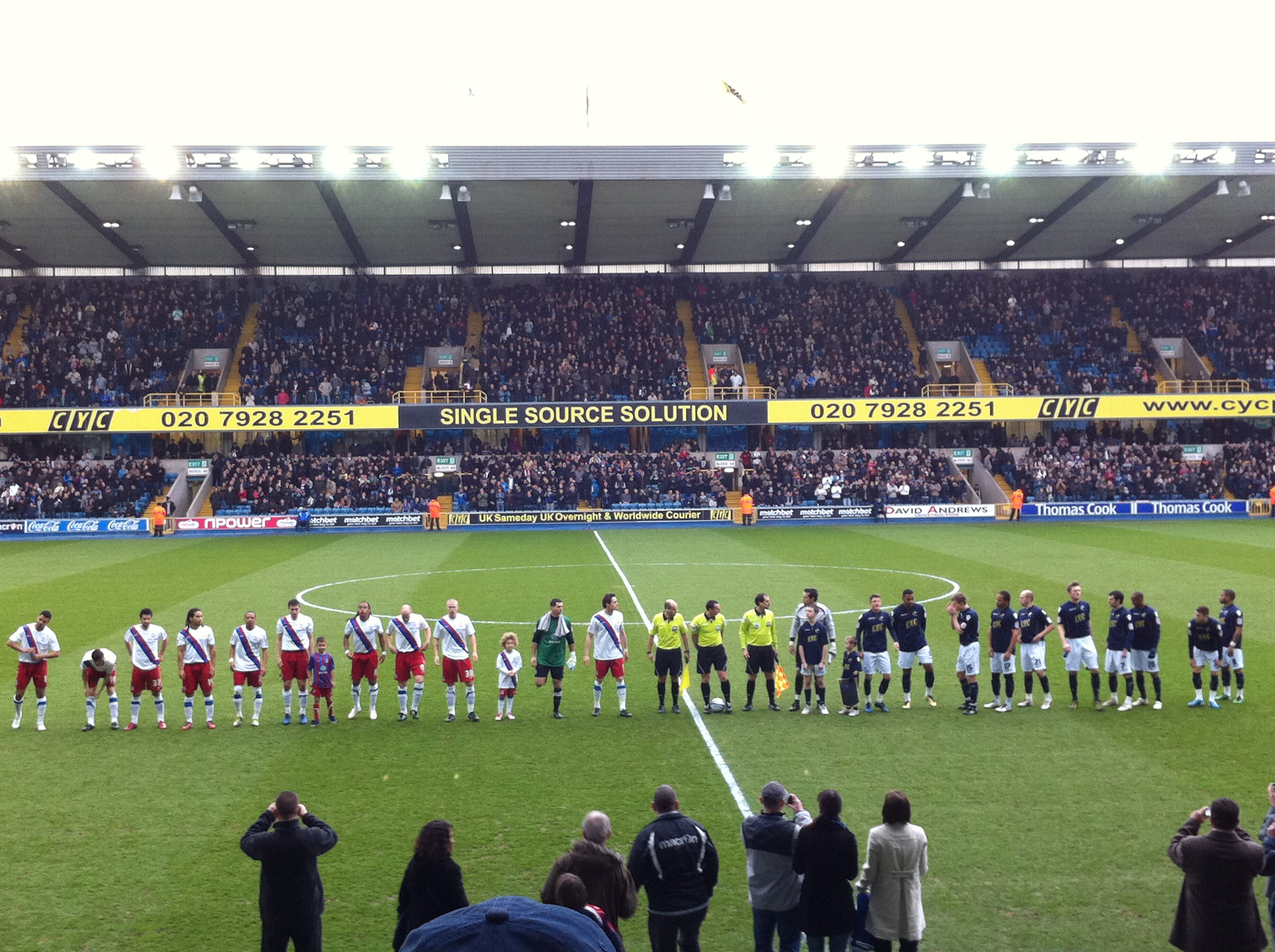
Millwall and Crystal Palace line-up at The Den on New Year's Day 2011.

The first meeting between the sides was in 1906 in the Southern League, when Millwall Athletic were still an East London side. Palace won the game 3–0 at the Crystal Palace National Sports Centre. Millwall moved south of the river in 1910 and the first true South London derby between the teams was held on 31 October 1910. It was a London PFA Charity Fund game, which Palace won 3–0 and was just Millwall's second game at their new ground, The Den. The first derby contested in The Football League was on 15 January 1921. Palace won the Third Division (south) game 1–0. They also won the reverse fixture which was held a week later; 3–2, to complete the first Football League double over their South London neighbours. Palace have completed a Football League double over Millwall seven times (in 1920–21. 1949–50, 1963–64, 1968–69, 1977–78, 1963–64, 1986–87, 1989–90.) Millwall have completed a Football League double over Palace six times (in 1925–26, 1926–27, 1957–58, 1959–60, 2001–01, 2010–11.) Palace's longest unbeaten streak is seven games, they won six and drew one game against Millwall between 1986 and 1993. Millwall's longest unbeaten streak against Palace is 19 games, between 1950 and 1958 they won 11 and drew 8 games.

=== By competition ===
As of 16 September 2025

Competition	Played	Palace wins	Drawn	Millwall wins	Palace goals	Millwall goals
Football League	86	26	26	34	106	126
FA Cup	12	4	4	4	16	18
League Cup	1	1	0	0	1	1
Football League Trophy	1	0	0	1	0	3
Anglo-Italian Cup	1	1	0	0	3	0
Sub-total	101	32	30	39	126	148
Southern Football League	20	12	3	5	28	11
Western Football League	2	0	0	2	3	5
London Challenge Cup	1	1	0	0	4	3
London PFA Charity Fund	3	1	0	2	5	4
Kent FA Challenge Cup finals	1	0	1	0	1	1
Kent Senior Shield	5	1	2	2	7	4
Southern Floodlight Cup	2	1	1	0	4	3
Total	135	48	37	50	178	179

=== Full list of results ===
Score lists home team first.

Date	Score	Winner	Competition	Venue	Attendance	Notes
15 January 1921	0–1	Palace	Third Division	The Den	20,000	First Football League game between the sides.
22 January 1921	3–2	Palace	Third Division	The Nest	18,000	League double (1st for Crystal Palace)
28 January 1922	0–0	Draw	FA Cup	The Nest	25,000	Second round.
1 February 1922	2–0	Millwall	FA Cup	The Den	35,800	Second round replay.
29 August 1925	1–2	Millwall	Third Division (South)	Selhurst Park	20,000	First South London derby held at Selhurst Park.
2 January 1926	1–0	Millwall	Third Division (South)	The Den	18,126	League double (1st for Millwall)
18 December 1926	1–0	Millwall	Third Division (South)	The Den	15,445	
7 May 1927	1–6	Millwall	Third Division (South)	Selhurst Park	15,000	Biggest winning margin for Millwall, league double (2nd for Millwall)
15 October 1927	0–4	Millwall	Third Division (South)	Selhurst Park	25,000	Six consecutive wins (longest streak in fixture)
25 February 1928	1–1	Draw	Third Division (South)	The Den	27,736	Second round.
26 January 1929	0–0	Draw	FA Cup	The Den	40,460	Fourth round, highest attendance in a South London derby.
30 January 1929	5–3	Palace	FA Cup	Selhurst Park	26,406	Highest-scoring game between the sides, Fourth round replay.
10 November 1934	1–1	Draw	Third Division (South)	Selhurst Park	11,000	
23 March 1935	3–2	Millwall	Third Division (South)	The Den	9,630	
2 November 1935	5–0	Palace	Third Division (South)	Selhurst Park	20,000	Biggest winning margin for Crystal Palace.
18 April 1936	4–0	Millwall	Third Division (South)	The Den	14,498	
5 December 1936	3–0	Millwall	Third Division (South)	The Den	19,063	
14 April 1937	1–0	Palace	Third Division (South)	Selhurst Park	7,000	
4 September 1937	2–2	Draw	Third Division (South)	The Den	25,894	
15 January 1938	0–0	Draw	Third Division (South)	Selhurst Park	22,000	
28 August 1948	1–1	Draw	Third Division (South)	Selhurst Park	30,500	First game in 10 years (longest period)
1 January 1949	1–0	Millwall	Third Division (South)	The Den	19,484	
8 October 1949	2–3	Palace	Third Division (South)	The Den	30,005	
25 February 1950	1–0	Palace	Third Division (South)	Selhurst Park	30,300	League double (2nd for Crystal Palace)
16 September 1950	1–0	Millwall	Third Division (South)	The Den	29,768	
25 November 1950	1–4	Millwall	FA Cup	Selhurst Park	14,817	First round.
20 January 1951	1–1	Draw	Third Division (South)	Selhurst Park	23,354	
1 September 1951	3–1	Millwall	Third Division (South)	The Den	22,386	
29 December 1951	1–1	Draw	Third Division (South)	Selhurst Park	20,752	
6 September 1952	0–0	Draw	Third Division (South)	The Den	25,886	
17 January 1953	0–1	Millwall	Third Division (South)	Selhurst Park	24,924	
5 September 1953	2–2	Draw	Third Division (South)	The Den	21,952	
16 January 1954	2–3	Millwall	Third Division (South)	Selhurst Park	16,106	
30 October 1954	5–2	Millwall	Third Division (South)	The Den	19,385	
19 March 1955	1–1	Draw	Third Division (South)	Selhurst Park	13,645	
3 September 1955	1–1	Draw	Third Division (South)	The Den	16,454	
31 December 1955	2–2	Draw	Third Division (South)	Selhurst Park	12,248	
15 September 1956	2–2	Draw	Third Division (South)	Selhurst Park	16,112	
5 January 1957	2–0	Millwall	FA Cup	The Den	26,790	Third round.
19 January 1957	3–0	Millwall	Third Division (South)	The Den	16,145	
28 August 1957	0–1	Millwall	Third Division (South)	Selhurst Park	22,680	
2 September 1957	3–0	Millwall	Third Division (South)	The Den	19,770	League double (3rd for Millwall)
4 October 1958	2–1	Millwall	Fourth Division	The Den	19,190	Millwall 19 games unbeaten (longest streak).
21 February 1959	4–0	Palace	Fourth Division	Selhurst Park	15,365	
28 October 1959	1–2	Millwall	Fourth Division	Selhurst Park	27,929	
12 December 1959	1–0	Millwall	Fourth Division	The Den	17,136	League double (4th for Millwall)
31 March 1961	0–2	Millwall	Fourth Division	Selhurst Park	37,774	Highest ever attendance in the fourth tier of the Football League.
3 April 1961	0–2	Palace	Fourth Division	The Den	15,503	
26 December 1962	3–0	Palace	Third Division	Selhurst Park	20,411	
1 April 1963	1–1	Draw	Third Division	The Den	21,586	
12 October 1963	2–1	Palace	Third Division	The Den	25,056	
22 February 1964	0–1	Palace	Third Division	Selhurst Park	19,239	League double (3rd for Crystal Palace)
15 October 1966	1–1	Draw	Second Division	The Den	28,644	
25 March 1967	1–2	Millwall	Second Division	Selhurst Park	30,845	
18 November 1967	2–2	Draw	Second Division	Selhurst Park	30,304	
13 April 1968	5–1	Millwall	Second Division	The Den	14,782	
23 November 1968	0–2	Palace	Second Division	The Den	27,913	
19 March 1969	4–2	Palace	Second Division	Selhurst Park	32,516	League double (4th for Crystal Palace)
17 November 1973	1–1	Draw	Second Division	Selhurst Park	30,054	
13 April 1974	3–2	Millwall	Second Division	The Den	20,176	
13 December 1975	1–1	Draw	FA Cup	The Den	14,920	Second round.
16 December 1975	2–1	Palace	FA Cup	Selhurst Park	18,284	Second round replay
20 December 1975	2–1	Millwall	Third Division	The Den	9,989	
30 March 1976	0–0	Draw	Third Division	Selhurst Park	38,075	Highest Football League attendance in the derby.
20 August 1977	0–3	Palace	Second Division	The Den	15,246	
2 January 1978	1–0	Palace	Second Division	Selhurst Park	27,259	League double (5th for Crystal Palace)
16 September 1978	0–3	Palace	Second Division	The Den	11,653	
20 January 1979	0–0	Draw	Second Division	Selhurst Park	23,142	
21 August 1982	3–0	Millwall	Football League Trophy	The Den	4,844	Group match, Millwall went on to win the trophy.
5 January 1985	1–1	Draw	FA Cup	The Den	11,125	Third round.
23 January 1985	1–2	Millwall	FA Cup	Selhurst Park	10,735	Third round replay
21 September 1985	2–1	Palace	Second Division	Selhurst Park	8,713	
22 April 1986	3–2	Millwall	Second Division	The Den	5,643	Lowest Football League attendance in the derby.
4 October 1986	2–1	Palace	Second Division	Selhurst Park	8,150	
28 March 1987	0–1	Palace	Second Division	The Den	6,285	League double (6th for Crystal Palace)
10 October 1987	1–0	Palace	Second Division	Selhurst Park	10,678	
12 March 1988	1–1	Draw	Second Division	The Den	12,815	
21 October 1989	4–3	Palace	First Division	Selhurst Park	18,920	First game between the sides in the top tier.
31 March 1990	1–2	Palace	First Division	The Den	13,332	League double (7th for Crystal Palace)
14 September 1993	3–0	Palace	Anglo-Italian Cup	Selhurst Park	2,712	Lowest attendance, seven games unbeaten for Palace (longest streak)
1 January 1994	3–0	Millwall	Division One	The Den	16,779	First game at The New Den, first win for Millwall in 8 years.
9 April 1994	1–0	Palace	Division One	Selhurst Park	23,142	
22 October 1995	1–2	Millwall	Division One	Selhurst Park	14,338	First win at Selhurst Park for 10 years (28 years in the league).
30 March 1996	1–4	Palace	Division One	The Den	13,214	
8 September 2001	1–3	Millwall	Division One	Selhurst Park	21,641	
26 December 2001	3–0	Millwall	Division One	The Den	16,630	League double (5th for Millwall)
7 December 2002	1–0	Palace	Division One	Selhurst Park	19,301	
21 April 2003	3–2	Millwall	Division One	The Den	10,670	
30 August 2003	1–1	Draw	Division One	The Den	14,425	
26 December 2003	0–1	Millwall	Division One	Selhurst Park	19,737	
3 December 2005	1–1	Draw	Championship	Selhurst Park	19,571	
18 February 2006	1–1	Draw	Championship	The Den	12,296	
16 October 2010	0–1	Millwall	Championship	Selhurst Park	16,693	
1 January 2011	3–0	Millwall	Championship	The Den	16,170	Puncheon scored a hat-trick for Millwall, league double (6th for Millwall)
26 November 2011	0–0	Draw	Championship	Selhurst Park	15,150	
31 December 2011	0–1	Palace	Championship	The Den	16,085	First win at The Den for 15 years.
20 October 2012	2–2	Draw	Championship	Selhurst Park	16,124	
30 April 2013	0–0	Draw	Championship	The Den	12,745	
8 January 2022	1–2	Palace	FA Cup	The Den	16,646	Third round. First FA Cup game between the sides for 37 years.
1 March 2025	3–1	Palace	FA Cup	Selhurst Park	21,263	Fifth round. Millwall goalkeeper Liam Roberts sent-off. Palace went on to win the final, their first major trophy.
16 September 2025	1–1 (4–2 p)	Palace	League Cup	Selhurst Park	16,754	Third round. First ever League Cup meeting between the sides.

== Millwall v AFC Wimbledon ==
Millwall and Wimbledon first met in the First round of the FA Cup in 2009, when Wimbledon were playing in the Conference National. Millwall won the game 4–1. The two sides have only played in the same tier together once, in the 2016–17 League One season and both games were drawn. They've played two other cup games; a 2–1 win for Millwall in the League Cup in 2013 and most recently in 2019, an FA Cup Fifth round game at Kingsmeadow, which Millwall won 1–0.

=== By competition ===
As of 16 February 2019

Competition	Played	Millwall wins	Drawn	AFC Wimbledon wins	Millwall goals	AFC Wimbledon goals
Football League	2	0	2	0	2	2
FA Cup	2	2	0	0	5	1
League Cup	1	1	0	0	2	1
Total	5	3	2	0	9	4

=== Full list of results ===
Score lists home team first.

Date	Score	Winner	Competition	Venue	Attendance	Notes
9 November 2009	4–1	Millwall	FA Cup	The Den	9,453	First ever competitive meeting, First round.
6 August 2013	2–1	Millwall	League Cup	The Den	4,443	First round.
22 November 2016	0–0	Draw	League One	The Den	8,614	First ever league meeting.
2 January 2017	2–2	Draw	League One	Kingsmeadow	4,742	
16 February 2019	0–1	Millwall	FA Cup	Kingsmeadow	4,795	Fifth round.

== Sutton United v AFC Wimbledon ==
This matchup has become known as the Thameslink derby, after the train operator that serves both locales. Sutton United and Wimbledon first met in the Third round of the FA Cup on 7 January 2017, when Sutton were a non-league club playing in the National League. The teams drew 0–0 at Gander Green Lane. Sutton won the replay 3–1 at Kingsmeadow.

=== By competition ===
As of 26 December 2023

Competition	Played	Sutton United wins	Drawn	AFC Wimbledon wins	Sutton United goals	AFC Wimbledon goals
Football League	4	3	0	1	4	4
FA Cup	2	1	1	0	3	1
Football League Trophy	2	1	0	1	1	1
Total	8	5	1	2	8	6

=== Full list of results ===
Score lists home team first.

Date	Score	Winner	Competition	Venue	Attendance	Notes
7 January 2017	0–0	Draw	FA Cup	Gander Green Lane	8,614	Third round. First ever meeting.
17 January 2017	1–3	Sutton	FA Cup	Kingsmeadow	4,768	Third round replay. First ever South London derby win for Sutton.
9 November 2021	1–0	Sutton	Football League Trophy	Gander Green Lane	2,458	Group game. Sutton went on to lose in the final at Wembley Stadium.
15 October 2022	0–1	Sutton	League Two	Plough Lane	8,568	First ever league meeting between the sides. First league derby win for Sutton.
22 November 2022	1–0	Wimbledon	Football League Trophy	Plough Lane	1,854	Round of 32, Southern Section. First Wimbledon derby win over Sutton.
1 January 2023	2–1	Sutton	League Two	Gander Green Lane	5,049	League double (1st for Sutton).
19 August 2023	0–3	Wimbledon	League Two	Gander Green Lane	4,719	First away win for Wimbledon.
26 December 2023	0–1	Sutton	League Two	Plough Lane	8,575	Last league derby for Sutton before being relegated back to non-league.

== All-time results ==
Chart of the league table positions of the South London Derby clubs.

The table includes all competitive first-team games played between the London rivals. From the first game played between Crystal Palace and Millwall on 17 November 1906, to the most recent South London derby played by newly promoted Bromley. Defunct club Wimbledon's results are included in a separate table below.

As of 24 January 2026.

Team	Played	Won	Drawn	Lost	For	Against	Win %
Bromley	4	2	0	2	1	3	50.00
Charlton Athletic	188	51	53	84	209	281	27.13
Crystal Palace	203	82	52	69	275	246	40.39
Millwall	244	97	74	73	352	298	39.75
Sutton United	9	5	1	3	8	9	55.56
AFC Wimbledon	30	9	6	15	32	43	30.00
Total	671	246	185	246	878	878	—

== Crossing the divides ==
=== Managers ===
Jimmy Seed, Alan Mullery, Iain Dowie, Ian Holloway and Alan Pardew have all permanently managed two South London clubs. Seed was in charge of Charlton for 23 years from 1933 to 1956, leading them to one of the most successful periods of their history, with successive promotions to the top-flight and an FA Cup Final win in 1947. He was sacked in 1956 after a bad run of form and took over at Millwall in 1958. Seed's start at The Den was poor, with the team going nine matches without a win. The team finished in 23rd place in Division Three (south). The following year saw The Lions playing in the new Fourth Division in which they finished 9th. Seed resigned at the end of that season, but stayed with the club as a director until his death on 16 July 1966.

Alan Mullery was in charge of Charlton from 1981 to 1982 and left to take the helm at Crystal Palace, where he remained manager until 1984. Theo Foley was Charlton manager from 1970 to 1974 and was briefly in charge of Millwall as a caretaker manager in 1977. Steve Gritt, who was joint-manager at Charlton with Alan Curbishley from 1991 to 1995, was also caretaker at Millwall briefly in 2000. Lennie Lawrence was Charlton's manager from 1982 to 1991 and was assistant manager at Crystal Palace, before joining former manager Dougie Freedman at Bolton Wanderers.

Iain Dowie was in charge of Crystal Palace between 21 December 2003 and 22 May 2006, when he was allowed to resign from his post, apparently to return to northern England because his wife was homesick. However, eight days later Premier League club Charlton unveiled Dowie as their new manager. Simon Jordan, Palace's chairman, immediately issued Dowie with a writ, claiming that he had misled him about his reasons for leaving the club; Dowie, however, insisted this was not the case, and was publicly backed by Charlton chief executive Peter Varney, who branded the writ "a sad and pathetic publicity stunt", and chairman Richard Murray, who was adamant that his legal team could find no grounds for the writ to be upheld, and suggested that there may be more personal reasons behind the writ being issued. The case was heard in the High Court in the summer of 2007 where a judge ruled that Dowie had lied when negotiating his way out of his contract. His spell at Charlton was largely unsuccessful and they parted company on 13 November 2006, after just 15 games in charge.

Ian Holloway took charge of Crystal Palace in November 2012. He guided them to promotion to the Premier League via the 2013 Football League play-offs, after beating Watford 1–0 with a penalty converted by Kevin Philips in extra time. On 23 October 2013, Holloway left the club by mutual consent after less than a year in charge. He managed to gain only three points from their first eight games in the top flight. On 6 January 2014, Holloway signed a two-and-a-half-year deal with Millwall, taking over from Steve Lomas. On 6 January 2014 he signed two-and-a-half-year deal with Millwall, taking over from Steve Lomas. He guided the club to Championship safety for the 2013–14 season as Millwall finished 19th, four points above the relegation places. In the 2014–15 season, as Millwall dropped in the relegation places in The Championship, Holloway admitted that he had become an unpopular manager with the Millwall fans. On 10 March 2015, Holloway was sacked, with the team second from bottom in the Championship and having lost five of their last six games. Former Charlton player Gary Rowett became Millwall manager on 21 October 2019. Rowett played 13 games for Charlton in the Premier League before being forced to retire through injury. Former Addicks player Johnnie Jackson managed Charlton from December 2021 until he was sacked in May 2022. Later that month, he signed a two-year contract as AFC Wimbledon manager. Steve Morison, Millwall's third all-time top scorer with 92 goals, became Sutton's manager in January 2024. But he couldn't save them from relegation back to the National League.

=== Players ===
Players who have played for at least two of the four clubs are listed below. As of 18 August 2012 (the last game he played for Millwall), Darren Ward has played the most games for South London teams, with 317 appearances in total (232 for Millwall, 69 for Crystal Palace and 16 for Charlton). Peter Burridge played 114 games for Palace, 87 for Millwall and 44 for Charlton. He holds the record for most goals scored by a player for South London clubs, with 104 in 245 appearances.

Charlton & Palace

- (England) Alan Pardew
- (England) Ben Watson
- (England) Bobby Goldthorpe
- (England) Chris Powell
- (England) Connor Wickham
- (England) Conor Gallagher
- (England) Danny Butterfield
- (England) Darren Ambrose
- (England) Darren Pitcher
- (England) Dave Madden
- (England) David Whyte
- (England) Don Townsend
- (England) Gary Borrowdale
- (Uruguay) Gonzalo Sorondo
- (Iceland) Hermann Hreiðarsson
- (England) Jerome Thomas
- (England) Jesurun Rak-Sakyi
- (England) John Salako
- (England) John Humphrey
- (Wales) Jonny Williams
- (England) Leon McKenzie
- (England) Les Fell
- (England) Marcus Bent
- (England) Mark Hudson
- (Sweden) Mathias Svensson
- (England) Mike Flanagan
- (Republic of Ireland) Paddy McCarthy
- (Senegal) Pape Souaré
- (England) Paul Kitson
- (England) Paul Mortimer
- (England) Paul Williams
- (Wales) Rhoys Wiggins
- (England) Ryan Inniss
- (England) Scott Sinclair
- (England) Sullay Kaikai
- (Norway) Thomas Myhre
- (England) Tony Burns

Charlton & Millwall

- (England) Alan McLeary
- (England) Ben Roberts
- (England) Ben Thatcher
- (England) Benny Fenton
- (England) Bobby Hunt
- (England) Charlie Hannaford
- (England) Charlie MacDonald
- (England) Danny Haynes
- (Republic of Ireland) Danny McNamara
- (Nigeria) Danny Shittu
- (France) Dany N'Guessan
- (England) Dave Mehmet
- (Republic of Ireland) Eamon Dunphy
- (England) Ernie Watkins
- (Argentina) Federico Bessone
- (England) Fred Ford
- (England) Gordon Bolland
- (Algeria) Hameur Bouazza
- (England) Harry Cripps
- (England) Izale McLeod
- (England) Jack Burkett
- (England) James Thompson
- (Scotland) Jimmy Yardley
- (Wales) Jim Ryan
- (England) John Sullivan
- (England) Johnny Summers
- (England) Josh Wright
- (Jamaica) Kevin Lisbie
- (Ghana) Kim Grant
- (England) Lawrie Madden
- (England) Lee Power
- (England) Lindsay Smith
- (Scotland) Lyndon Dykes
- (Barbados) Mark McCammon
- (England) Martyn Waghorn
- (England) Mickey Bennett
- (England) Nicky Bailey
- (England) Nicky Johns
- (England) Pat Terry
- (England) Paul Sturgess
- (England) Phil Walker
- (England) Phil Warman
- (England) Terry Brisley
- (Guadeloupe) Therry Racon
- (England) Tony Towner
- (Trinidad and Tobago) Tony Warner
- (Democratic Republic of the Congo) Trésor Kandol

Millwall & Palace

- (England) Andy Gray
- (England) Andy Roberts
- (England) Anton Otulakowski
- (England) Bill Roffey
- (England) Bobby Bowry
- (England) Bruce Dyer
- (Australia) Carl Veart
- (England) Chris Armstrong
- (England) Chris Day
- (England) Clive Allen
- (England) Dave Martin
- (England) David Fry
- (England) Derek Jeffries
- (England) Derek Possee
- (England) Eberechi Eze
- (England) Harry Redmond
- (Wales) James Williams
- (England) Jamie Moralee
- (England) Jamie Vincent
- (England) Jason Puncheon
- (Wales) Jermaine Easter
- (England) John Brearley
- (England) John Jackson
- (England) Johnny Roche
- (England) Kenny Brown
- (Australia) Kevin Muscat
- (England) Lewis Grabban
- (England) Matt Lawrence
- (England) Mel Blyth
- (England) Neil Emblen
- (England) Neil Ruddock
- (England) Nick Chatterton
- (England) Noel Whelan
- (Republic of Ireland) Owen Garvan
- (Barbados) Paul Ifill
- (England) Paul Hinshelwood
- (England) Paul Sansome
- (England) Phil Barber
- (England) Ray Wilkins
- (England) Ricky Newman
- (England) Romain Esse
- (England) Ryan Smith
- (England) Shaun Derry
- (England) Steve Claridge
- (Wales) Steve Lovell
- (England) Tony Craig
- (England) Tony Witter
- (England) Trevor Aylott

Charlton & AFC Wimbledon

- (England) Barry Fuller
- (England) Deji Oshilaja
- (England) Diallang Jaiyesimi
- (England) Jason Euell
- (England) Joe Pigott
- (England) Michael Smith
- (England) Yado Mambo

Millwall & AFC Wimbledon

- (Republic of Ireland) Alex Pearce
- (England) Jack Smith
- (Comoros) Jimmy Abdou
- (England) Paul Robinson
- (Scotland) Peter Sweeney

Palace & AFC Wimbledon

- (England) John-Kymani Gordon
- (Northern Ireland) Kofi Balmer
- (Ghana) Kwesi Appiah

Charlton, Palace & Millwall

- (England) Darren Ward
- (England) Dave Tuttle
- (England) Freddy Wood
- (England) Jonathan Obika
- (Guyana) Leon Cort
- (England) Mark Bright
- (England) Nathan Ashton
- (England) Peter Burridge
- (Jamaica) Ricardo Fuller
- (England) Tony Hazell

Charlton, Millwall & AFC Wimbledon

- (England) Jamie Stuart
- (Montserrat) Lyle Taylor

Charlton, Palace & AFC Wimbledon

- (England) Tom Soares

Palace, Millwall & AFC Wimbledon

- (England) Andy Frampton

== Wimbledon FC and AFC Wimbledon ==
The 2003 relocation and 2004 renaming of Wimbledon F.C. as Milton Keynes Dons meant that a South London derby team was lost. In 2002 the majority of Wimbledon supporters formed a new team, AFC Wimbledon, based at Kingsmeadow in Kingston upon Thames. The non-League club started in the Combined Counties League, and played their first competitive South London derby on 9 November 2009, losing 4–1 away at Millwall in an FA Cup first-round match. Having worked their way up through non-League with five promotions in nine seasons, AFC Wimbledon were promoted first into Football League Two for the 2011–12 season. They spent five seasons at that level before being promoted into League One for the 2016–17 season, where they competed in the same league as Charlton Athletic and Millwall.

=== Wimbledon FC's derby results ===
Wimbledon played their first South London derby against Millwall on 5 April 1980, a game which ended 2–2. On 24 March 2004, they played their last derby also against Millwall, which they lost 0–1. Their record in all competitions against Charlton, Crystal Palace and Millwall is as follows:

Opponent	Played	Wins	Draws	Losses	Goals for	Goals against	Win %
Charlton Athletic	16	8	4	4	28	21	50
Crystal Palace	26	8	5	13	35	39	31
Millwall	22	9	8	5	34	27	41
Total	64	25	17	22	97	87	

== Gallery ==
South London derby

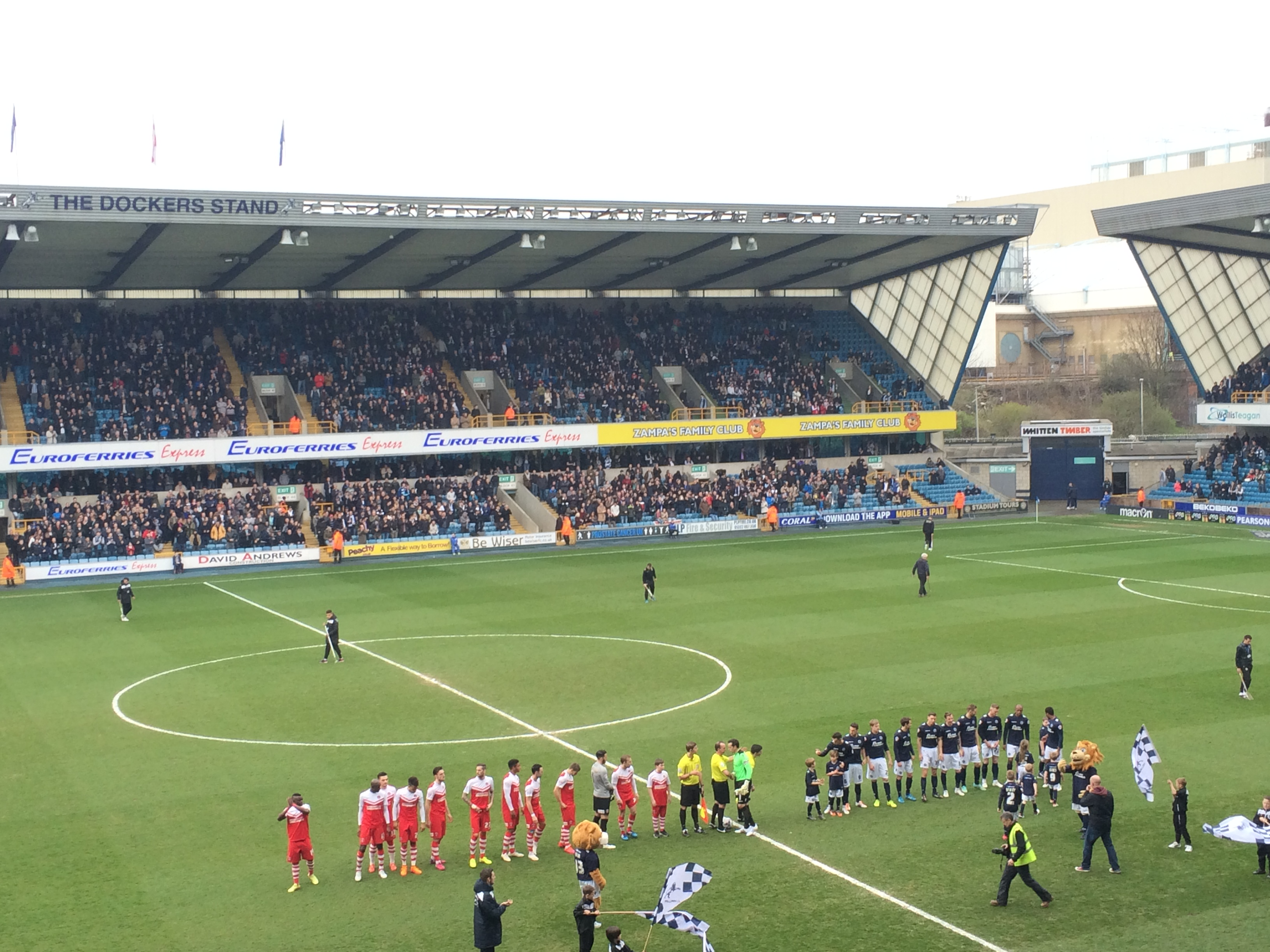
Millwall and Charlton play at The Den in 2015

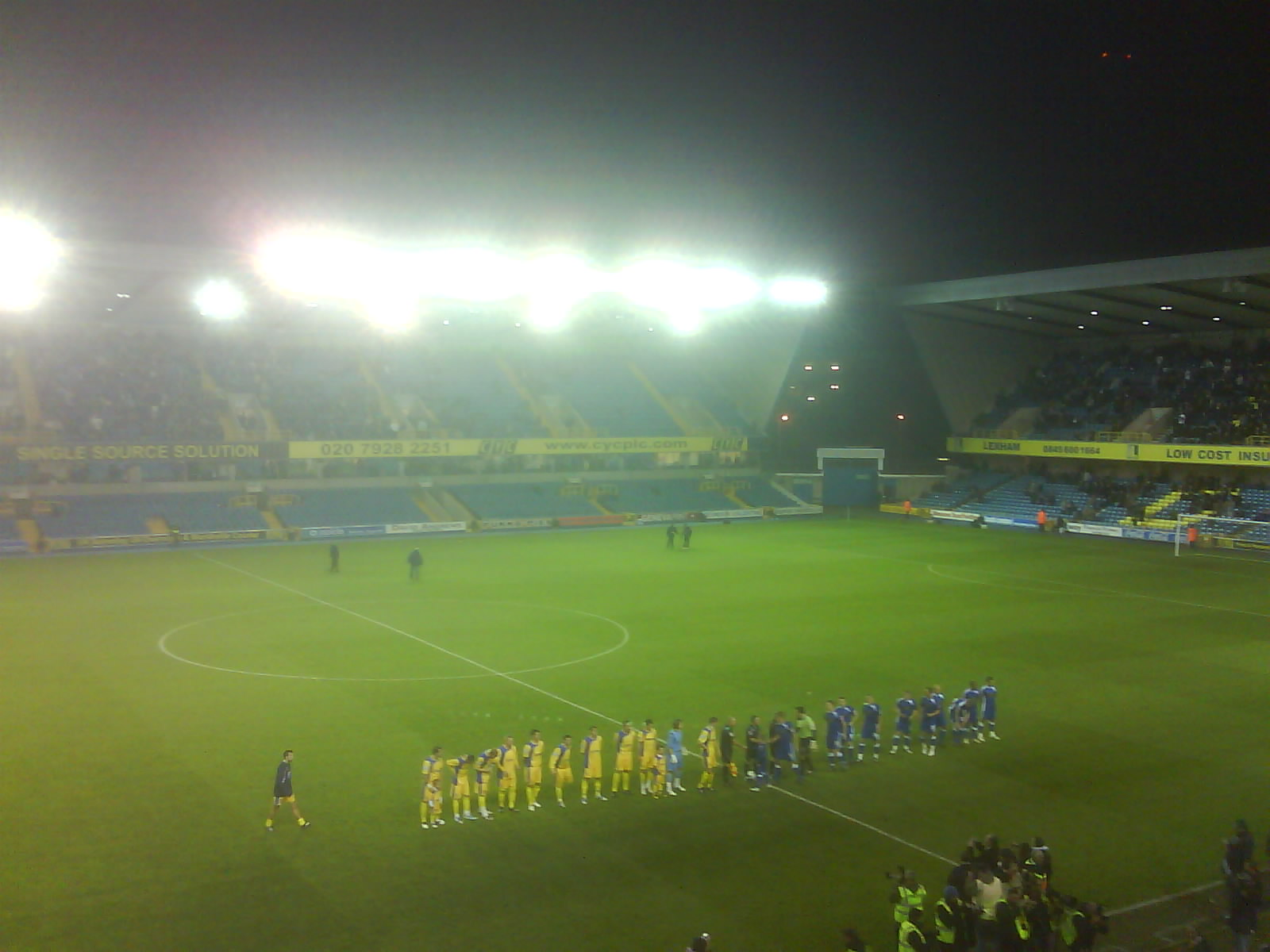
AFC Wimbledon and Millwall players met for the first time in the FA Cup at The Den in 2009.

Millwall fans celebrate Theo Robinson's winner against Crystal Palace at Selhurst Park in the 2010–11 season.

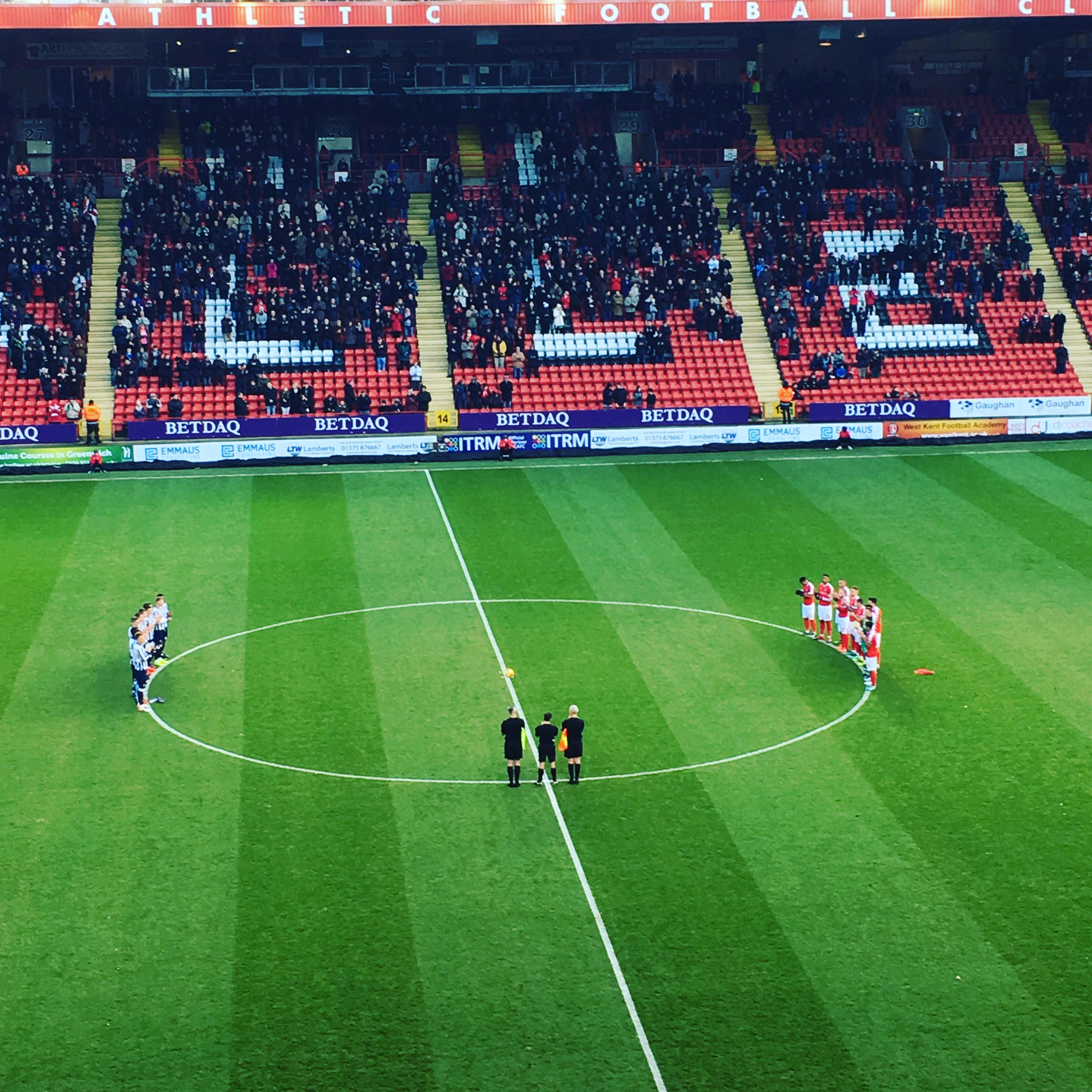
Millwall and Charlton players pay tribute to Graham Taylor at The Valley in January, 2017.

Millwall fans celebrate Shane Lowry's 35-yard freekick against Charlton Athletic at The Valley on 16 March 2013

== See also ==
- Millwall F.C.–West Ham United F.C. rivalry
- Brighton & Hove Albion F.C.–Crystal Palace F.C. rivalry
- AFC Wimbledon–Milton Keynes Dons F.C. rivalry
- Leeds United F.C.–Millwall F.C. rivalry
- London derbies
