= Terry Johnson (footballer) =

English footballer

Personal information
- Full name: Terence Johnson
- Date of birth: 30 August 1949 (age 77)
- Place of birth: Benton, England
- Position: Forward

Youth career
- Longbenton Juniors
- 1967–1969: Newcastle United

Senior career*
Years	Team	Apps	(Gls)
1969–1971	Newcastle United	0	(0)
1969	→ Darlington (loan)	4	(1)
1971–1974	Southend United	158	(35)
1974–1977	Brentford	101	(27)
1977–1982	Blyth Spartans		
1982–	Bedlington Terriers		
–1983	Blyth Spartans		
- * Club domestic league appearances and goals

Terence Johnson (born 30 August 1949) is an English retired professional football forward who made 263 appearances in the Football League for Darlington, Southend United and Brentford. He is a member of the Blyth Spartans Hall of Fame.

== Playing career ==
=== Newcastle United ===
A forward, Johnson began his career as a junior with hometown club Newcastle United. He was a prolific scorer for the club's youth and reserve teams, bagging nearly 50 goals. He looked set to make his senior debut for the club in a Inter-Cities Fairs Cup third round first leg match away to Real Zaragoza on New Year's Day 1969, but passport issues prevented him from travelling with the squad. Johnson failed to make an appearance for Newcastle United and departed the club in January 1971.

==== Darlington (loan) ====
With a lack of first team opportunities available at Newcastle, Johnson joined Fourth Division club Darlington on loan in November 1969. He made four league appearances and scored one goal for the Quakers.

=== Southend United ===
Johnson signed for Fourth Division club Southend United in January 1971, for a £7,000 fee. He scored 8 goals in 21 games during the remainder of the 1970–71 season. Johnson was a virtual ever-present for the next three seasons and helped the club to promotion to the Third Division in the 1971–72 season. He won the club's Player of the Year award for his performances in the 1972–73 season. He departed the Shrimpers in November 1974, after making 170 appearances and scoring 38 goals.

=== Brentford ===
Johnson signed for Fourth Division club Brentford in November 1974 for a £15,000 fee. He made 110 appearances for the Bees and scored 30 goals before problems with homesickness saw him quit Griffin Park at the end of the 1976–77 season.

=== Blyth Spartans ===
Johnson ended his career with a spell at Northern League club Blyth Spartans. During the 1977–78 season, he was a part of the squad which won a hat-trick of cups and took Fourth Division club Wrexham to a replay in the fifth round of the FA Cup, a match played at St James' Park. Despite retiring due to injury in January 1980, Johnson returned to the club a matter of months later and finished the 1979–80 season with a Northern League winner's medal. The 1980–81 and 1981–82 seasons brought two more Northern League championships and a number of minor cup wins before his departure during the 1982 off-season. After spell with Northern League Second Division club Bedlington Terriers during the first half of the 1982–83 season, Johnson returned to Blyth Spartans and helped the club to another First Division title prior to his retirement at the end of the campaign. Johnson was later inducted into the club's Hall of Fame.

== Honours ==
Southend United

- Football League Fourth Division second-place promotion: 1971–72

Blyth Spartans

- Northern League: 1979–80, 1980–81, 1981–82, 1982–83
- Northern League Cup: 1977–78, 1981–82
- Northumberland Senior Cup: 1977–78, 1980–81, 1981–82
- Debenhams Cup: 1977–78

Individual

- Southend United Player of the Year: 1972–73
- Blyth Spartans Hall of Fame

== Career statistics ==
Appearances and goals by club, season and competition
Club	Season	League			FA Cup		League Cup		Total	
Club	Season	Division	Apps	Goals	Apps	Goals	Apps	Goals	Apps	Goals
Southend United	Total		158	35	6	2	6	1	170	38
Brentford	1974–75	Fourth Division	28	8	2	0	—		30	8
Brentford	1975–76	Fourth Division	46	11	4	2	2	1	53	14
Brentford	1976–77	Fourth Division	27	8	1	0	0	0	28	8
Brentford	Total		101	27	7	2	2	1	110	30
Career total			259	62	13	4	8	2	280	68
