= Harry Redmond =

Harry Redmond may refer to:

- Harry Redmond (baseball) (1887–1960), baseball player
- Harry Redmond Jr. (1909–2011), American special effects artist and film producer
- Harry Redmond (footballer) (1933–1985), English footballer
