= Aylott =

Aylott is a surname. Notable people with the surname include:

- Steve Aylott (born 1951), English footballer
- Trevor Aylott (born 1957), English footballer
