= Graham Cox (footballer, born 1959) =

English footballer

Personal information
- Full name: Graham Paul Cox
- Date of birth: 30 April 1959
- Place of birth: Willesden, England
- Date of death: 17 May 2024 (aged 65)
- Position: Goalkeeper

Youth career
- 1975–1977: Brentford

Senior career*
Years	Team	Apps	(Gls)
1977–1979	Brentford	4	(0)
1978	→ Margate (loan)	1	(0)
1980–1981	Wokingham Town		
1981–1982	Addlestone & Weybridge Town		
- Hillingdon Borough
- South Ascot
1985–1986	Aldershot	16	(0)
1985	→ Slough Town (loan)	4	(0)
1986	Slough Town	16	(0)

Managerial career
- Slough Town (assistant)
- * Club domestic league appearances and goals

Graham Paul Cox (30 April 1959 – 17 May 2024) was an English footballer who played as a goalkeeper in the Football League for Brentford and Aldershot.

== Career ==
=== Brentford ===
A goalkeeper, Cox joined Brentford as an apprentice during the 1975–76 pre-season. He made his debut in a 3–1 Fourth Division defeat to AFC Bournemouth on 1 January 1977. He also played in the following matches against Colchester United and Crewe Alexandra and conceded seven goals. With the team leaking goals, Crystal Palace keeper Tony Burns was brought in on loan, which ended Cox's involvement in the first team in the 1976–77 season. Cox signed his first professional contract in April 1977, but his final competitive appearance for the Bees came on 26 September 1977 in a 1–1 draw with Stockport County. He joined Southern League Premier Division strugglers Margate on loan in September 1978 and made one appearance as cover for regular goalkeeper Steve Bowtell. Cox departed Brentford at the end of the 1978–79 season.

=== Later career ===
After his release from Brentford in 1979, Cox dropped into non-League football and played for Wokingham Town, Addlestone & Weybridge Town, Hillingdon Borough and South Ascot. He made a return to the Football League with Aldershot in January 1985 and made 16 Fourth Division appearances before departing in 1986. Cox joined Isthmian League Premier Division club Slough Town on loan in October 1985 and made 12 appearances before suffering a double arm fracture and a broken collarbone in a league match versus Sutton United on 23 November. After recovering, he joined the Rebels permanently in April 1986 and made the last of a further 22 appearances in November that year. He stayed on at the club and became assistant manager.

== Personal life ==
In the 1990s, Cox worked in Bracknell with former Aldershot teammate Tommy Langley, as a photocopier and fax machine salesman.

== Career statistics ==
Appearances and goals by club, season and competition
Club	Season	League			FA Cup		League Cup		Other		Total	
Club	Season	Division	Apps	Goals	Apps	Goals	Apps	Goals	Apps	Goals	Apps	Goals
Brentford	1976–77	Fourth Division	3	0	0	0	0	0	—		3	0
Brentford	1977–78	Fourth Division	1	0	0	0	0	0	—		1	0
Brentford	Total		4	0	0	0	0	0	—		4	0
Margate (loan)	1978–79	Southern League Premier Division	1	0	—		—		—		1	0
Slough Town	1985–86	Isthmian League Premier Division	5	0	5	0	—		3 (Note: 2 appearances in Berks & Bucks Senior Cup, 1 appearance in Isthmian League Cup)	0	13	0
Slough Town	1986–87	Isthmian League Premier Division	15	0	4	0	—		2 (Note: 1 appearance in FA Trophy, 1 appearance in Isthmian League Cup)	0	21	0
Slough Town	Total		20	0	9	0	—		5	0	34	0
Career total			25	0	9	0	0	0	5	0	39	0
