= Sid Bishop =

Sid Bishop may refer to:

- Sid Bishop (footballer, born 1934) (1934–2020), English footballer
- Sid Bishop (footballer, born 1900) (1900–1949), English international footballer
