= Steve Scrivens =

English footballer

Personal information
- Full name: Stephen Scrivens
- Date of birth: 11 March 1957 (age 69)
- Place of birth: Ewell, England
- Positions: Left winger; forward

Youth career
- –1975: Fulham

Senior career*
Years	Team	Apps	(Gls)
1975–1980	Fulham	4	(1)
1976	→ Brentford (loan)	5	(0)
1980–1983	Woking		
- Kingstonian
- Staines Town
- Dorking
- * Club domestic league appearances and goals

Stephen Scrivens (born 11 March 1957) was an English professional football winger who played in the Football League for Fulham and Brentford.

== Club career ==
=== Fulham ===
Scrivens began his career as a trainee with Second Division club Fulham. Aged just 18, he made his senior debut during the 1974–75 season and signed his first professional contract in March 1975. He made three appearances and a goal during the 1975–76 season, but failed to make a further appearance before departing the club in June 1980.

==== Brentford (loan) ====
Scrivens joined Fulham's West London rivals Brentford on loan in December 1976. Scrivens made five Fourth Division appearances during his spell and manager Bill Dodgin showed interest in signing him permanently, but a deal failed to materialise.

=== Non-league football ===
After his release from Fulham in 1980, Scrivens signed for Isthmian League Premier Division strugglers Woking. He later played for Kingstonian, Staines Town and Dorking.

== Career statistics ==
Club	Season	League			FA Cup		League Cup		Total	
Club	Season	Division	Apps	Goals	Apps	Goals	Apps	Goals	Apps	Goals
Fulham	1974–75	Second Division	1	0	0	0	0	0	1	0
Fulham	1975–76	Second Division	2	1	0	0	0	0	2	1
Fulham	Total		3	1	0	0	0	0	3	1
Brentford (loan)	1976–77	Fourth Division	5	0	—		—		5	0
Career total			8	1	0	0	0	0	8	1
