= Sid Bishop (footballer, born 1934) =

English footballer (1934–2020)

Personal information
- Full name: Sidney Harold Richard Bishop
- Date of birth: 8 April 1934
- Place of birth: Tooting, London, England
- Date of death: 22 April 2020 (aged 86)
- Place of death: Harlow, Essex, England
- Height: 6 ft 0 in (1.83 m)
- Position: Defender

Senior career*
Years	Team	Apps	(Gls)
1953–1965	Leyton Orient	296	(4)
1965–1966	Hastings United		
1966–1969	Guildford City		
- * Club domestic league appearances and goals

Sidney Harold Richard Bishop (8 April 1934 – 22 April 2020) was an English footballer who played as a defender, mainly for Leyton Orient. He is considered one of the best defenders in the history of the East London club.

== Career ==
=== Leyton Orient ===
Born in Tooting, Bishop joined Orient's groundstaff in June 1952, having played for the club's nursery side Chase of Chertsey, and turned professional as a player six months later. He made his debut in a 1–1 draw at home to Swindon Town on 27 February 1954. During his first four seasons he was only selected occasionally, although he made 15 appearances in 1955–56 as Orient won the Third Division South title. However, it was not until the 1957–58 season that Bishop became a regular first-team player, forming a strong defensive line with Welshmen Mal Lucas and Cyril Lea. By the time of Orient's 1961–62 campaign Bishop was ever-present, playing in all 49 of the club's matches as they won promotion to the First Division for the first time.

During Orient's only season in the top flight, Bishop played 39 matches, and scored the winning goal in a 2–1 win over Liverpool on 2 May 1963, his last goal for the club. His other three goals had come during the 1960–61 season, including a 40-yard drive past Howard Radford in a 3–2 win at home to Bristol Rovers on 4 February 1961. He was released in May 1965 by Orient's new manager Dave Sexton, having made 323 senior appearances, making him one of only twelve Orient players to have played more than 300 matches for the club.

=== Non-league career ===
After leaving Leyton Orient aged 31, Bishop moved into non-league football with Hastings United of the Southern League. He became player-manager there, bringing former England international Bobby Smith and Welsh U21 international Jim Ryan to the club.

With Hastings narrowly failing to achieve promotion in 1965–66, Bishop moved to Guildford City, again as player-manager.

=== Death ===
Bishop died in hospital in Harlow on 22 April 2020, after many years in close contact with Leyton Orient, via the supporters' club.
