= Eddie Lyons (footballer) =

English footballer

Personal information
- Full name: Albert Edward Lyons
- Date of birth: 20 May 1920
- Place of birth: Rochdale, England
- Date of death: November 1996 (aged 76)
- Place of death: Bracknell, England
- Position: Full back

Youth career
- –1941: Stockport County

Senior career*
Years	Team	Apps	(Gls)
1941–1944	Stockport County	0	(0)
1944–1950	Bury	2	(0)
1950–1952	Millwall	6	(0)
1952–1953	Crewe Alexandra	23	(0)
1953–1954	Rochdale	19	(1)
- Dartford
- Gravesend & Northfleet

Managerial career
- 1976: Brentford (caretaker)
- * Club domestic league appearances and goals

Albert Edward Lyons (20 May 1920 – November 1996) was an English professional football full back who played in the Football League for Bury, Millwall, Crewe Alexandra and Rochdale. After his retirement as a player, Lyons served Brentford in a number of backroom roles for over 30 years.

== Playing career ==
A full back, Lyons began his career in wartime football with Stockport County and after the war, he played in the Football League for Bury, Millwall, Crewe Alexandra and Rochdale. He ended his career in non-league football with Southern League clubs Dartford and Gravesend & Northfleet and won the league title with the latter club in the 1957–58 season.

== Physiotherapy and coaching career ==
After retiring from football, Lyons became assistant trainer at Brentford. He also helped Ted Gaskell with the running of the club's short-lived 'A' team in the late 1950s and early 1960s. Lyons progressed to become the club physiotherapist in the 1970s and took caretaker charge for one match in September 1976 after the departure of John Docherty. Lyons was awarded a testimonial for his service in May 1984 and at age 63, he played the final 15 minutes of the match against Chelsea. He earned £8,000 from the match (equivalent to £26,100 in 2025), was given a gold watch and was presented with a Canon League Loyalty Award by Brentford chairman Martin Lange. In September 1990, he came out of retirement to serve as a physiotherapist for the officials at an England international match at Wembley Stadium.

== Personal life ==
After leaving league football, Lyons settled in Ealing and purchased a newsagents, which he ran with his wife Iris. Lyons suffered from health problems in later life, including bladder cancer, a stroke and having a triple heart bypass operation. As of August 1996, he was living in Bracknell.

== Honours ==
Gravesend & Northfleet

- Southern League: 1957–58

Individual

- Canon League Loyalty Award

== Career statistics ==
Appearances and goals by club, season and competition
Club	Season	League			FA Cup		Total	
Club	Season	Division	Apps	Goals	Apps	Goals	Apps	Goals
Millwall	1949–50	Third Division South	4	0	—		4	0
Millwall	1950–51	Third Division South	1	0	0	0	1	0
Millwall	1951–52	Third Division South	1	0	1	0	2	0
Career total			6	0	1	0	7	0
