= Gordon Quinn (footballer) =

English footballer (1932–2018)

Personal information
- Full name: Gordon Patrick Quinn
- Date of birth: 11 May 1932
- Place of birth: Hammersmith, England
- Date of death: February 2018 (aged 85)
- Place of death: Brent, England
- Position: Inside forward

Youth career
- Ruislip Youth
- –1952: Eastcote Boys' Club

Senior career*
Years	Team	Apps	(Gls)
1952–1956	Queens Park Rangers	21	(1)
1956–1957	Plymouth Argyle	14	(2)
1957–1958	Tunbridge Wells United		
1958–1959	Tonbridge	11	(0)
1959–1960	Cambridge United		
1960	Gravesend & Northfleet		
1960–1963	Dover		
1963–1964	Margate	1	(0)
1964	Gravesend & Northfleet		
- * Club domestic league appearances and goals

Gordon Patrick Quinn ( 11 May 1932 – February 2018) was an English professional footballer who played as an inside forward in the Football League for Queens Park Rangers and Plymouth Argyle. He later served as chief scout at Brentford.

== Career statistics ==
Appearances and goals by club, season and competition
Club	Season	League			FA Cup		Other		Total	
Club	Season	Division	Apps	Goals	Apps	Goals	Apps	Goals	Apps	Goals
Queens Park Rangers	1952–53	Third Division South	3	1	0	0	—		3	1
Queens Park Rangers	1953–54	Third Division South	10	0	1	0	—		11	0
Queens Park Rangers	1955–56	Third Division South	4	0	0	0	—		4	0
Queens Park Rangers	1956–57	Third Division South	4	0	—		—		4	0
Queens Park Rangers	Total		21	1	1	0	—		22	1
Plymouth Argyle	1956–57	Third Division South	11	2	0	0	—		11	2
Plymouth Argyle	1957–58	Third Division South	3	0	—		—		3	0
Plymouth Argyle	Total		14	2	0	0	—		14	2
Tonbridge	1958–59	Southern League South East Division	11	0	0	0	8 (Note: 4 appearances in Southern League Zonal Cup, 3 appearances in Southern League Cup, 1 appearance in Kent Senior Shield)	0	19	0
Margate	1963–64	Southern League Premier Division	1	0	—		1 (Note: Appearance in Kent Floodlight Cup)	0	2	0
Career total			47	3	1	0	9	0	56	3
