= Bobby Goldthorpe =

English footballer

Personal information
- Full name: Robert James Goldthorpe
- Date of birth: 6 December 1950 (age 75)
- Place of birth: Osterley, England
- Position: Centre back

Youth career
- –1967: Brentford
- –1968: Fulham
- 1968–1972: Crystal Palace

Senior career*
Years	Team	Apps	(Gls)
1972	Crystal Palace	1	(0)
1972–1976	Charlton Athletic	79	(0)
	→ Bath City (loan)	5	(0)
1976	→ Aldershot (loan)	16	(0)
1976–1977	Brentford	19	(2)
1977–1978	Hayes	50	(0)
- * Club domestic league appearances and goals

Robert James Goldthorpe (born 6 December 1950) is an English retired professional footballer who played in the Football League for Charlton Athletic, Brentford, Aldershot and Crystal Palace as a centre back.

== Personal life ==
During his spell with Hayes in 1977 and 1978, Goldthorpe lived in Upper Norwood and was a representative for an insurance company.

== Career statistics ==
Appearances and goals by club, season and competition
Club	Season	League			FA Cup		League Cup		Total	
Club	Season	Division	Apps	Goals	Apps	Goals	Apps	Goals	Apps	Goals
Crystal Palace	1971–72	First Division	1	0	0	0	0	0	1	0
Aldershot (loan)	1975–76	Third Division	16	0	—		—		16	0
Brentford	1976–77	Fourth Division	19	2	2	0	2	0	23	0
Career total			36	2	2	0	2	0	40	0

== Honours ==
Charlton Athletic

- Football League Third Division third-place promotion: 1974–75
