= 1980–81 Northern Football League =

The 1980–81 Northern Football League season was the 83rd in the history of Northern Football League, a football competition in England.

== Clubs ==
Northern Football League
- Season: 1980–81
- Champions: Blyth Spartans
- Matches: 380
- Goals: 1,202 (3.16 per match)

Division One featured 20 clubs which competed in the league last season, no new clubs joined the division this season.

=== League table ===
Pos	Team	Pld	W	D	L	GF	GA	GD	Pts
1	Blyth Spartans	38	27	5	6	89	35	+54	86
2	Spennymoor United	38	26	7	5	82	38	+44	85
3	Bishop Auckland	38	22	7	9	68	36	+32	73
4	Tow Law Town	38	18	13	7	83	54	+29	67
5	Ashington	38	17	12	9	95	66	+29	63
6	Ferryhill Athletic	38	17	10	11	71	49	+22	61
7	Shildon	38	17	8	13	56	54	+2	59
8	South Bank	38	16	9	13	55	44	+11	57
9	Billingham Synthonia	38	13	15	10	52	51	+1	54
10	Penrith	38	15	8	15	75	66	+9	53
11	Whitby Town	38	15	7	16	55	59	−4	52
12	Horden Colliery Welfare	38	12	9	17	48	65	−17	45
13	Consett	38	12	6	20	49	54	−5	42
14	North Shields	38	10	10	18	56	71	−15	40
15	Evenwood Town	38	10	10	18	41	66	−25	40
16	West Auckland Town	38	10	10	18	40	67	−27	40
17	Durham City	38	9	11	18	46	74	−28	38
18	Crook Town	38	10	8	20	47	79	−32	38
19	Whitley Bay	38	9	7	22	53	72	−19	34
20	Willington	38	6	6	26	41	102	−61	24

Source: fchd
Rules for classification: 1) points; 2) goal difference; 3) number of goals scored.
