= 1979–80 Northern Football League =

The 1979–80 Northern Football League season was the 82nd in the history of Northern Football League, a football competition in England.

== Clubs ==
Northern Football League
- Season: 1979–80
- Champions: Blyth Spartans
- Matches: 380
- Goals: 1,208 (3.18 per match)

Division One featured 20 clubs which competed in the league last season, no new clubs joined the division this season.

=== League table ===
Pos	Team	Pld	W	D	L	GF	GA	GD	Pts
1	Blyth Spartans	38	29	5	4	93	28	+65	92
2	Spennymoor United	38	26	7	5	83	40	+43	85
3	Horden Colliery Welfare	38	24	6	8	73	32	+41	78
4	Ashington	38	21	8	9	88	53	+35	71
5	Crook Town	38	21	8	9	77	51	+26	71
6	Bishop Auckland	38	18	9	11	64	54	+10	63
7	Consett	38	19	4	15	78	59	+19	61
8	South Bank	38	16	7	15	68	52	+16	55
9	Shildon	38	16	7	15	70	71	−1	55
10	West Auckland Town	38	16	6	16	57	52	+5	54
11	Whitby Town	38	14	10	14	72	62	+10	52
12	Tow Law Town	38	16	4	18	50	56	−6	52
13	Evenwood Town	38	14	9	15	49	55	−6	51
14	Penrith	38	13	5	20	54	72	−18	44
15	Billingham Synthonia	38	10	12	16	44	72	−28	42
16	North Shields	38	12	3	23	62	81	−19	39
17	Ferryhill Athletic	38	9	7	22	38	60	−22	34
18	Durham City	38	7	9	22	30	63	−33	30
19	Willington	38	6	5	27	27	105	−78	23
20	Whitley Bay	38	4	7	27	31	90	−59	16 (Note: Whitley Bay were deducted three points.)

Source: fchd
Rules for classification: 1) points; 2) goal difference; 3) number of goals scored.
