= Jim Ryan (footballer, born 1942) =

Welsh footballer

Personal information
- Full name: James Patrick Ryan
- Date of birth: 6 September 1942 (age 84)
- Place of birth: Prestatyn, Wales
- Position: Centre forward

Senior career*
Years	Team	Apps	(Gls)
1961–1962	Dulwich Hamlet	?	(?)
1962–1965	Charlton Athletic	16	(8)
1965–1966	Millwall	12	(2)
1966–1967	Hastings United	?	(?)
1967	Exeter City	20	(5)
1967–1968	Dover	?	(8)
Total		48	(15)

International career
1964	Wales U23	1	(0)
- * Club domestic league appearances and goals

James Patrick Ryan (born 6 September 1942) was a Welsh footballer who played as a centre forward in the Football League.
