= Harry Redmond (footballer) =

English footballer

Personal information
- Full name: Harold Redmond
- Date of birth: 24 March 1933
- Place of birth: Manchester, England
- Date of death: 1985 (aged 51–52)
- Position: Full back

Senior career*
Years	Team	Apps	(Gls)
1957–1958	Crystal Palace	2	(0)
1958–1960	Millwall	54	(0)
1960	Dartford		
- * Club domestic league appearances and goals

Harry Redmond (24 March 1933 – 1985) was an English-born former footballer who played as a full back in the Football League in the late-1950s and early 1960s. He was born in Manchester.

He first played in the Football League with Crystal Palace in 1957–58, and made two league appearances for the club. He then played for Millwall in the League between 1958/59 and 1960/61, making 54 appearances for them before moving into non-league football with Dartford.
