= Steve Aylott =

English footballer

Personal information
- Full name: Stephen John Aylott
- Date of birth: 3 September 1951 (age 75)
- Place of birth: Ilford, Essex, England
- Position: Midfielder

Youth career
- 1967–1969: Leyton Orient
- 1969–1971: West Ham United

Senior career*
Years	Team	Apps	(Gls)
1971–1976	Oxford United	154	(8)
1976–1978	Brentford	7	(0)
- * Club domestic league appearances and goals

Steve Aylott (born 3 September 1951) is an English former professional footballer who played as a defensive midfielder in the Football League for Oxford United and Brentford.

== Playing career ==
He was a Leyton Orient and West Ham apprentice centre-half and went to the Manor Ground on trial towards the end of 1970–71 after a visit to the Manor with the Hammers' Combination side. He failed to make the Hammers' League sideafter becoming a full-timer in August 1969, but soon made an impact for Oxford United. Aylott joined an Oxford side already well-stocked with centre-backs and was converted to anchor man in midfield for the Reserves, who were embarking on their best season.

He inched ahead of John Fleming to earn a League debut on 9 October 1971, against Middlesbrough, in place of Ron Atkinson and after a substitute slot, succeeded the injured, soon-to-depart, Atkinson for much of the rest of his Manor career. Sometimes he appeared as full-back. He scored his first goal on 18 December 1971, in a home match against Preston North End. The competition for midfield places intensified in 1973–1974, but Aylott enjoyed his best season in 1974–75.

His last game for Oxford was 19 April 1976, away to Southampton. The need to trim the staff after relegation at the end of 1975–1976 saw him released and he joined Brentford.

== Sources ==
- Andy Howland; Roger Howland (1989). Oxford United – A complete Record 1893–1989. ISBN 0-907969-52-6.
- Steve Aylott at Post War English & Scottish Football League A–Z Player's Transfer Database
