= Tony Burns =

English footballer and manager

Personal information
- Full name: Anthony John Burns
- Date of birth: 27 March 1944 (age 82)
- Place of birth: Edenbridge, Kent, England
- Position: Goalkeeper

Youth career
- ?–1963: Tonbridge Angels
- 1963–1964: Arsenal

Senior career*
Years	Team	Apps	(Gls)
1964–1966	Arsenal	31	(0)
1966–1969	Brighton & Hove Albion	54	(0)
1969–1970	Charlton Athletic	10	(0)
1971–1972	Durban United	?	(?)
1973	Maritzburg	?	(?)
1973–1978	Crystal Palace	90	(0)
1977	→ Brentford (loan)	6	(?)
1978	Memphis Rogues	12	(0)
1978–1979	Plymouth Argyle	8	(0)

Managerial career
- 2006: Millwall (caretaker)
- * Club domestic league appearances and goals

Anthony John Burns (born 27 March 1944 in Edenbridge, Kent, England) is an English goalkeeping coach and former football goalkeeper and manager.

== Career ==
=== Club ===
Burns played for non-league Tonbridge Angels before being signed by Arsenal in March 1963. He progressed through the Arsenal youth ranks, before making his league debut against Burnley on 17 October 1964. He went on to be a regular in the side, playing for 24 consecutive league games between October 1964 and March 1965, but conceded 38 goals in his time there and he was eventually dropped in favour of Jim Furnell. He had sporadic appearances in the side from then on, before eventually leaving Arsenal in July 1966.

He was sold to Brighton & Hove Albion and later on played for Charlton Athletic, Durban United, Crystal Palace, Brentford (loan), Memphis Rogues and Plymouth Argyle.

=== Managerial ===
Burns managed Tonbridge in three separate spells, from August 1980 to December 1982, August 1989 to May 1990, and in a caretaker role from November 2001 to May 2002. Between 1982 and 1985 he managed Gravesend & Northfleet.

Burns was Millwall's goalkeeping coach for 14 years, between 1992 and 2006. He was appointed joint caretaker manager of Millwall with Alan McLeary in April 2006. The following month the duo stepped down to make way for a new permanent manager, Nigel Spackman. He moved to Crystal Palace in July 2006 to become their goalkeeping coach, but left the post in November 2007. In July 2014 he joined Gillingham Football Club as Senior Goalkeeping Coach.
