= 1979–80 Brentford F.C. season =

English football team season

Brentford
1979–80 season
- Chairman: Dan Tana
- Manager: Bill Dodgin Jr. (until 15 March 1980); Fred Callaghan (from 15 March 1980)
- Stadium: Griffin Park
- Third Division: 19th
- FA Cup: First round
- League Cup: First round
- Top goalscorer: League: Phillips (12); All: Phillips (12)
- Highest home attendance: 13,764
- Lowest home attendance: 4,992
- Average home league attendance: 7,818
Home colours	Away colours	Third colours

During the 1979–80 English football season, Brentford competed in the Football League Third Division. Despite challenging for promotion in the first half of the season, a barren run between December 1979 and March 1980 meant that the Bees' Third Division status was only preserved on the final day of the season.

== Season summary ==
Brentford manager Bill Dodgin Jr. oversaw one of the quietest off-seasons in recent years, with the only change being in the striking department – Andrew McCulloch departed for a club record £60,000 fee and in came Lee Holmes and Billy Holmes, the latter for a £10,000 fee. In direct contrast to the previous two seasons, Brentford started strongly, winning six and drawing three of the first 11 league matches of the season to rise to 3rd position in the Third Division on 10 October 1979. Continued good results and a boost from the loan signing of winger Keith Fear put the Bees in 2nd place behind leaders Sheffield United one month later, but after a 7–2 victory over Hull City on 8 December (the Bees' biggest win of the season), the team's form collapsed.

Between 15 December 1979 and 29 March 1980, Brentford won just 7 of a possible 36 points and dropped from 3rd to 18th place. A 1–0 home defeat to Rotherham United at Griffin Park on 29 March left the Bees just two points above the relegation zone and the result spelt the end for manager Bill Dodgin Jr, who was given a paid leave of absence until the end of the season by the Brentford board. Former Woking manager Fred Callaghan was appointed to the position and oversaw something of a revival, though Brentford went into the final match of the season versus Millwall needing at least a point to guarantee safety. A goal from one of Bill Dodgin Jr.'s final signings, Tony Funnell, was enough to preserve Brentford's Third Division status.

One club record was equalled during the season:

- Most consecutive away Football League clean sheets: 4 (8 September – 10 October 1979)

== League table ==
Pos	Team	Pld	W	D	L	GF	GA	GD	Pts	Promotion or relegation
17	Oxford United	46	14	13	19	57	62	−5	41	
18	Blackpool	46	15	11	20	62	74	−12	41	
19	Brentford	46	15	11	20	59	73	−14	41	
20	Hull City	46	12	16	18	51	69	−18	40	
21	Bury (R)	46	16	7	23	45	59	−14	39	Relegation to the Fourth Division

Source: rsssf.com
(R) Relegated

== Results ==
Brentford's goal tally listed first.

=== Legend ===
Win	Draw	Loss

=== Pre-season and friendlies ===
Date	Opponent	Venue	Result	Scorer(s)
31 July 1979	Wrexham	H	5–1	Phillips (3), Shrubb, Fraser
3 August 1979	Charlton Athletic	H	2–1	McNichol, L. Holmes
7 August 1979	St Albans City	A	1–0	McNichol
8 August 1979	Epson & Ewell	A	2–0	L. Holmes, Glover
14 April 1980	Slough Town	A	2–1	Booker
6 May 1980	Tooting & Mitcham United	A	1–2	Phillips

=== Football League Third Division ===
No.	Date	Opponent	Venue	Result	Attendance	Scorer(s)
1	18 August 1979	Reading	A	2–2	8,140	Henderson (og), Fraser
2	25 August 1979	Swindon Town	A	0–4	7,204	
3	1 September 1979	Chesterfield	H	3–1	5,762	Carlton, Fraser, W. Holmes
4	8 September 1979	Sheffield Wednesday	A	2–0	11,778	L. Holmes, Phillips
5	15 September 1979	Grimsby Town	H	1–0	7,121	Salman
6	17 September 1979	Exeter City	H	0–2	7,809	
7	22 September 1979	Wimbledon	A	0–0	5,524	
8	29 September 1979	Southend United	H	2–0	6,928	McNichol, Phillips
9	3 October 1979	Exeter City	A	0–0	3,297	
10	6 October 1979	Barnsley	H	3–1	7,292	Kruse, L. Holmes, Smith
11	10 October 1979	Oxford United	A	2–0	6,362	McNichol, Phillips
12	13 October 1979	Blackpool	A	4–5	5,386	Carlton, Phillips, W. Holmes, McNichol
13	20 October 1979	Blackburn Rovers	H	2–0	7,970	McNichol, Phillips
14	22 October 1979	Sheffield United	H	1–2	13,764	Smith
15	27 October 1979	Plymouth Argyle	A	1–0	5,203	J. Graham
16	3 November 1979	Reading	H	2–2	10,011	Smith (2)
17	6 November 1979	Sheffield United	A	2–0	14,808	Tibbott (og), Smith
18	10 November 1979	Colchester United	H	1–0	9,070	McNichol
19	17 November 1979	Rotherham United	A	2–4	4,709	McNichol (2, 1 pen)
20	1 December 1979	Carlisle United	A	1–3	4,275	L. Holmes
21	8 December 1979	Hull City	H	7–2	6,793	Phillips (2), Booker (3), Fear, Kruse
22	15 December 1979	Oxford United	H	1–1	7,592	Salman
23	21 December 1979	Bury	A	2–4	2,443	Fraser, Booker
24	26 December 1979	Chester	H	2–2	10,139	McNichol, Fear
25	29 December 1979	Swindon Town	H	1–3	12,122	Fraser
26	5 January 1980	Gillingham	H	0–2	7,849	
27	12 January 1980	Chesterfield	A	0–1	5,529	
28	19 January 1980	Sheffield Wednesday	H	2–2	8,389	Phillips, L. Holmes
29	2 February 1980	Grimsby Town	A	1–5	9,817	Phillips
30	9 February 1980	Wimbledon	H	0–1	7,383	
31	16 February 1980	Southend United	A	2–3	4,198	Shrubb, Phillips
32	23 February 1980	Blackpool	H	2–1	6,403	Booker, Salman
33	1 March 1980	Blackburn Rovers	A	0–3	10,227	
34	8 March 1980	Plymouth Argyle	H	0–0	6,462	
35	10 March 1980	Mansfield Town	A	0–0	3,461	
36	15 March 1980	Barnsley	A	0–1	9,368	
37	18 March 1980	Millwall	A	1–3	6,107	Kruse
38	23 March 1980	Colchester United	A	1–6	3,821	Funnell
39	29 March 1980	Rotherham United	H	0–1	4,992	
40	5 April 1980	Chester	A	1–1	2,930	Phillips
41	7 April 1980	Mansfield Town	H	2–0	6,057	L. Holmes, Phillips
42	8 April 1980	Bury	H	0–0	6,751	
43	12 April 1980	Gillingham	A	1–0	5,889	Booker
44	19 April 1980	Carlisle United	H	0–3	6,130	
45	26 April 1980	Hull City	A	1–2	5,382	L. Holmes
46	3 May 1980	Millwall	H	1–0	7,033	Funnell

=== FA Cup ===
Round	Date	Opponent	Venue	Result	Attendance	Scorer
1R	24 November 1979	Swindon Town	A	1–4	9,472	Smith

=== Football League Cup ===
Round	Date	Opponent	Venue	Result	Attendance	Scorer
1R (1st leg)	15 August 1979	Southend United	A	1–2	4,780	L. Holmes
1R (2nd leg)	21 August 1979	Southend United	H	1–4 (lost 6–2 on aggregate)	7,818	Allder

- Sources: 100 Years of Brentford, The Big Brentford Book of the Seventies, Statto

== Playing squad ==
Players' ages are as of the opening day of the 1979–80 season.

Pos.	Name	Nat.	Date of birth (age)	Signed from	Signed in	Notes
Goalkeepers
GK	Len Bond	(England)	12 January 1954 (aged 25)	Bristol City	1977	
GK	Trevor Porter	(England)	16 October 1956 (aged 22)	Slough Town	1978	
Defenders
DF	Iori Jenkins	(Wales)	11 December 1959 (aged 19)	Chelsea	1979	
DF	Pat Kruse	(England)	30 November 1953 (aged 25)	Torquay United	1977	
DF	Jim McNichol	(Scotland)	9 June 1958 (aged 21)	Luton Town	1978	
DF	Danis Salman	(England)	12 March 1960 (aged 19)	Youth	1975	
DF	Paul Shrubb	(England)	1 August 1955 (aged 24)	Hellenic	1977	
DF	Barry Tucker	(Wales)	28 August 1952 (aged 26)	Northampton Town	1978	
Midfielders
MF	Doug Allder	(England)	30 December 1951 (aged 27)	Unattached	1977	
MF	Dave Carlton	(England)	24 November 1952 (aged 26)	Northampton Town	1976	
MF	John Fraser	(England)	12 July 1953 (aged 26)	Fulham	1976	
MF	Allan Glover	(England)	21 October 1950 (aged 28)	Orient	1978	
MF	Jackie Graham (c)	(Scotland)	16 July 1946 (aged 33)	Guildford City	1970	
MF	Willie Graham	(Northern Ireland)	14 February 1959 (aged 20)	Northampton Town	1977	
MF	Paul Walker	(England)	17 December 1960 (aged 18)	Youth	1976	
Forwards
FW	Bob Booker	(England)	25 January 1958 (aged 21)	Bedmond Sports & Social	1978	Loaned to Barnet
FW	Tony Funnell	(England)	20 August 1957 (aged 21)	Gillingham	1980	
FW	Billy Holmes	(England)	4 February 1951 (aged 28)	Hereford United	1979	
FW	Lee Holmes	(England)	28 September 1955 (aged 23)	Haringey Borough	1979	
FW	Steve Phillips	(England)	4 August 1954 (aged 25)	Northampton Town	1977	
FW	Dean Smith	(England)	28 November 1958 (aged 20)	Leicester City	1977	
Players who left the club mid-season
DF	Steve Harding	(England)	23 July 1956 (aged 23)	Bristol Rovers	1980	Returned to Bristol Rovers after loan
MF	Noel Parkinson	(England)	16 November 1959 (aged 19)	Ipswich Town	1980	Returned to Ipswich Town from loan
FW	Keith Fear	(England)	8 May 1952 (aged 27)	Plymouth Argyle	1979	Returned to Plymouth Argyle after loan

- Sources: The Big Brentford Book of the Seventies, Timeless Bees

== Coaching staff ==
=== Bill Dodgin Jr. (15 August 1979 – 15 March 1980) ===
Name	Role
(England) Bill Dodgin Jr.	Manager
(England) Tommy Baldwin	Assistant Manager
(England) Eddie Lyons	Physiotherapist

=== Fred Callaghan (15 March – 3 May 1980) ===
Name	Role
(England) Fred Callaghan	Manager
(England) Eddie Lyons	Physiotherapist

== Statistics ==
=== Appearances and goals ===
Substitute appearances in brackets.

Pos	Nat	Name	League		FA Cup		League Cup		Total	
Pos	Nat	Name	Apps	Goals	Apps	Goals	Apps	Goals	Apps	Goals
GK	(England)	Len Bond	42	0	1	0	2	0	45	0
GK	(England)	Trevor Porter	4	0	0	0	0	0	4	0
DF	(Wales)	Iori Jenkins	1	0	—		—		1	0
DF	(England)	Pat Kruse	44	3	1	0	2	0	47	3
DF	(Scotland)	Jim McNichol	31	8	1	0	2	0	34	8
DF	(England)	Danis Salman	39 (2)	3	1	0	1	0	41 (2)	3
DF	(England)	Paul Shrubb	34 (5)	1	0 (1)	0	2	0	36 (6)	1
DF	(Wales)	Barry Tucker	41 (1)	0	1	0	0	0	42 (1)	0
MF	(England)	Doug Allder	19 (8)	0	1	0	1 (1)	1	21 (9)	1
MF	(England)	Dave Carlton	38	2	1	0	2	0	41	2
MF	(England)	John Fraser	42	4	1	0	2	0	45	4
MF	(England)	Allan Glover	3 (1)	0	0	0	2	0	5 (1)	0
MF	(Scotland)	Jackie Graham	30 (1)	1	1	0	0	0	31 (1)	1
MF	(Northern Ireland)	Willie Graham	1	0	0	0	0	0	1	0
MF	(England)	Paul Walker	2 (1)	0	0	0	0	0	2 (1)	0
FW	(England)	Bob Booker	9 (3)	6	—		0	0	9 (3)	6
FW	(England)	Tony Funnell	8 (1)	2	—		—		8 (1)	2
FW	(England)	Billy Holmes	8 (7)	2	0	0	0	0	8 (7)	2
FW	(England)	Lee Holmes	26 (2)	6	0	0	2	1	28 (2)	7
FW	(England)	Steve Phillips	45 (1)	12	1	0	2	0	48 (1)	12
FW	(England)	Dean Smith	20 (2)	5	1	1	2	0	23 (2)	6
Players loaned in during the season
DF	(England)	Steve Harding	3 (1)	0	—		—		3 (1)	0
MF	(England)	Keith Fear	7 (1)	2	—		—		7 (1)	2
MF	(England)	Noel Parkinson	9 (1)	0	—		—		9 (1)	0

- Players listed in italics left the club mid-season.
- Source: 100 Years of Brentford

=== Goalscorers ===
Pos.	Nat	Player	FL3	FAC	FLC	Total
FW	(England)	Steve Phillips	12	0	0	12
DF	(Scotland)	Jim McNichol	8	0	0	8
FW	(England)	Lee Holmes	7	0	0	7
FW	(England)	Bob Booker	6	0	0	6
FW	(England)	Dean Smith	5	1	0	6
MF	(England)	John Fraser	4	0	0	4
DF	(England)	Pat Kruse	3	0	0	3
DF	(England)	Danis Salman	3	0	0	3
MF	(England)	Keith Fear	2	—	—	2
FW	(England)	Tony Funnell	2	—	—	2
MF	(England)	Dave Carlton	2	0	0	2
FW	(England)	Billy Holmes	2	0	0	2
MF	(England)	Doug Allder	1	0	0	1
MF	(Scotland)	Jackie Graham	1	0	0	1
DF	(England)	Paul Shrubb	1	0	0	1
Opponents			2	0	0	2
Total			59	1	2	62

- Players listed in italics left the club mid-season.
- Source: 100 Years of Brentford

=== Management ===
Name	Nat	From	To	Record All Comps					Record League				
Name	Nat	From	To	P	W	D	L	W %	P	W	D	L	W %
Bill Dodgin, Jr.	(England)	15 August 1979	29 March 1980	42	12	9	21	28.57	39	12	9	18	30.77
Fred Callaghan	(England)	29 March 1980	3 May 1980	7	3	2	2	42.86	7	3	2	2	42.86

=== Summary ===
Games played	49 (46 Third Division, 1 FA Cup, 2 League Cup)
Games won	15 (15 Third Division, 0 FA Cup, 0 League Cup)
Games drawn	11 (11 Third Division, 0 FA Cup, 0 League Cup)
Games lost	23 (20 Third Division, 1 FA Cup, 2 League Cup)
Goals scored	62 (59 Third Division, 1 FA Cup, 2 League Cup)
Goals conceded	83 (73 Third Division, 4 FA Cup, 6 League Cup)
Clean sheets	16 (16 Third Division, 0 FA Cup, 0 League Cup)
Biggest league win	7–2 versus Hull City, 8 December 1979
Worst league defeat	6–1 versus Colchester United, 23 March 1980
Most appearances	49, Steve Phillips (46 Third Division, 1 FA Cup, 2 League Cup)
Top scorer (league)	12, Steve Phillips
Top scorer (all competitions)	12, Steve Phillips

== Transfers & loans ==
Players transferred in
Date	Pos.	Name	Previous club	Fee	Ref.
June 1979	FW	(England) Lee Holmes	(England) Haringey Borough	n/a	
August 1979	FW	(England) Billy Holmes	(England) Hereford United	£10,000	
September 1979	DF	(England) Dave O'Mahoney	n/a	n/a	
November 1979	DF	(Wales) Iori Jenkins	(England) Chelsea	Free	
1979	MF	(England) Terry Benning	(England) Watford	n/a	
January 1980	n/a	(England) Barry Bowen	n/a	Non-contract	
March 1980	FW	(England) Tony Funnell	(England) Gillingham	£56,000	
Players loaned in
Date from	Pos.	Name	From	Date to	Ref.
November 1979	MF	(England) Keith Fear	(England) Plymouth Argyle	January 1980	
17 January 1980	DF	(England) Steve Harding	(England) Bristol Rovers	February 1980	
19 February 1980	MF	(England) Noel Parkinson	(England) Ipswich Town	April 1980	
Players transferred out
Date	Pos.	Name	Subsequent club	Fee	Ref.
June 1979	FW	(England) Andrew McCulloch	(England) Sheffield Wednesday	£60,000	
Players loaned out
Date from	Pos.	Name	To	Date to	Ref.
October 1979	FW	(England) Bob Booker	(England) Barnet	December 1979	
Players released
Date	Pos.	Name	Subsequent club	Join date	Ref.
May 1980	MF	(England) Doug Allder	(England) Tooting & Mitcham United	1980	
May 1980	MF	(England) Terry Benning	n/a	n/a	
May 1980	MF	(England) Allan Glover	(England) Staines Town	1980	
May 1980	MF	(Scotland) Jackie Graham	(England) Addlestone & Weybridge Town	1980	
May 1980	FW	(England) Billy Holmes	(England) Aylesbury United	1980	
May 1980	GK	(England) Trevor Porter	Retired		

== Awards ==
- Supporters' Player of the Year: Pat Kruse
- Players' Player of the Year: Pat Kruse
