= 1977–78 Brentford F.C. season =

English football team season

Brentford
1977–78 season
- Chairman: Dan Tana
- Manager: Bill Dodgin Jr.
- Stadium: Griffin Park
- Fourth Division: 4th (promoted)
- FA Cup: Second round
- League Cup: First round
- Top goalscorer: League: Phillips (32); All: Phillips (36)
- Highest home attendance: 14,496
- Lowest home attendance: 5,492
- Average home league attendance: 8,578
Home colours	Away colours

During the 1977–78 English football season, Brentford competed in the Football League Fourth Division. 58 goals from Steve Phillips and Andrew McCulloch helped the club to a 4th-place finish and promotion to the Third Division. Phillips' 36 goals was the most in English league football by any player during the season.

== Season summary ==
Having spent much of the previous season rebuilding the unbalanced squad left by his predecessor John Docherty, Brentford manager Bill Dodgin Jr. shrugged off two off-season disappointments (failing to agree a fee with Bristol City for John Bain and Terry Johnson's refusal to sign a new contract) by bringing in goalkeeper Len Bond for £8,000 and midfielders Barry Lloyd and Willie Graham. Expectations were high going into the 1977–78 Fourth Division season, with Dodgin's attractive brand of attacking football having led to 14 wins from the final 18 matches of the previous season.

After a what was then becoming traditional first round exit of the League Cup, Brentford had a strong start to the league season, going top on 22 August 1977 after a 4–1 victory over Fourth Division newcomers Wimbledon. The three-pronged attack of forwards Gordon Sweetzer, Andrew McCulloch and midfielder Steve Phillips proved fruitful after 10 league matches and Phillips and Sweetzer topped the Fourth Division goalscoring chart with eight apiece. Injuries to Gordon Sweetzer, Dave Carlton, John Fraser, captain Jackie Graham and a suspension suffered by Andrew McCulloch nullified Brentford's threat through the Christmas period and the club dropped back into the upper reaches of mid-table.

By mid-January 1978, Brentford began to recover and the £10,000 signing of full back Barry Tucker would prove to be the final piece of the jigsaw in manager Bill Dodgin Jr.'s starting XI. A 4–0 win over Rochdale at Griffin Park on 6 March put the Bees back on the cusp of the promotion places for the first time since mid-December, but the shock transfer of forward Gordon Sweetzer to Cambridge United two days later for a £30,000 fee was seen as a massive risk. Sweetzer had scored 40 goals from his 72 appearances for the club over 18 months, but manager Dodgin felt that with Steve Phillips having scored 16 goals from midfield so far in the season, Phillips could move up to the forward line to partner Andrew McCulloch. In addition, Phillips was allowed to play a free role in matches, roaming between midfield, the wings and the forward line. Dodgin's decision proved to be a masterstroke, with Phillips scoring 16 goals in the final 15 matches of the season and promotion to the Third Division was secured with two matches still to play.

Phillips' 36 goals meant that he finished the season as the top scorer in English league football, while Andrew McCulloch and the departed Gordon Sweetzer supported ably with 22 and 14 goals respectively. The 58 goals Phillips' and McCulloch's strike partnership yielded equated to just under 63% of the club's total scored in league matches.

One club record was equalled during the season:

- Highest away Football League aggregate score: 10 (6–4 versus Crewe Alexandra, 3 September 1977)

== League table ==
Pos	Team	Pld	W	D	L	GF	GA	GD	Pts	Promotion or relegation
2	Southend United (P)	46	25	10	11	66	39	+27	60	Promotion to the Third Division
3	Swansea City (P)	46	23	10	13	87	47	+40	56	Promotion to the Third Division
4	Brentford (P)	46	21	14	11	86	54	+32	56	Promotion to the Third Division
5	Aldershot	46	19	16	11	67	47	+20	54	
6	Grimsby Town	46	21	11	14	57	51	+6	53	

(P) Promoted

== Results ==
Brentford's goal tally listed first.

=== Legend ===
Win	Draw	Loss

=== Pre-season and friendlies ===
Date	Opponent	Venue	Result	Attendance	Scorer(s)
2 August 1977	Brighton & Hove Albion	H	2–3	2,501	Sweetzer, Phillips
8 August 1977	Charlton Athletic	H	2–2	2,260	Sweetzer (2)
10 August 1977	Barnet	A	4–1	n/a	Glynn (2), McCulloch, Phillips
30 August 1977	Kuwait	H	0–2	n/a	
2 May 1978	Staines Town	A	2–1	n/a	Rolph, Walker
3 May 1978	Folkestone	A	0–0	n/a	
9 May 1978	Chelsea	H	2–8	7,400	Allder, Kruse

=== Football League Fourth Division ===
No.	Date	Opponent	Venue	Result	Attendance	Scorer(s)
1	20 August 1977	Northampton Town	H	3–0	5,492	Lloyd, McCulloch, Phillips
2	22 August 1977	Wimbledon	H	4–1	11,001	McCulloch, Phillips, Sweetzer, Lloyd
3	27 August 1977	Reading	H	1–1	8,176	Sweetzer (pen)
4	3 September 1977	Crewe Alexandra	A	6–4	1,837	Collier (og), Carlton (2), Sweetzer (3)
5	10 September 1977	Bournemouth	H	1–1	7,702	Phillips
6	13 September 1977	Rochdale	A	2–1	1,164	McCulloch, Kruse
7	17 September 1977	Doncaster Rovers	A	1–3	3,044	Phillips
8	24 September 1977	Scunthorpe United	H	2–0	6,115	McCulloch, Phillips
9	26 September 1977	Stockport County	A	1–1	4,121	Sweetzer
10	1 October 1977	Halifax Town	H	4–1	6,239	Phillips (2, 1 pen), J. Graham, Lloyd
11	3 October 1977	Watford	H	0–3	14,496	
12	8 October 1977	Torquay United	A	1–2	2,538	McCulloch
13	15 October 1977	Southport	H	0–0	6,141	
14	22 October 1977	Hartlepool United	A	1–3	2,470	Phillips
15	29 October 1977	Southend United	H	1–0	7,435	McCulloch
16	5 November 1977	York City	H	1–0	5,985	Phillips
17	12 November 1977	Barnsley	A	0–0	4,209	
18	19 November 1977	Swansea City	H	0–2	6,337	
19	2 December 1977	Darlington	A	3–1	2,058	McCulloch, Phillips, Rolph
20	10 December 1977	Grimsby Town	H	3–1	5,762	McCulloch (2), Phillips
21	26 December 1977	Aldershot	A	0–1	8,175	
22	27 December 1977	Newport County	H	3–3	8,972	Phillips (pen), Allder, Baldwin
23	31 December 1977	York City	A	2–3	2,329	McCulloch, Phillips
24	2 January 1978	Huddersfield Town	H	1–1	9,475	Shrubb
25	7 January 1978	Wimbledon	A	1–1	5,411	Sweetzer
26	14 January 1978	Northampton Town	A	2–2	4,050	McCulloch (2)
27	28 January 1978	Crewe Alexandra	H	5–1	6,871	McCulloch, Phillips (2, 1 pen), W. Graham, Sweetzer
28	4 February 1978	Bournemouth	A	2–3	3,417	McCulloch, Sweetzer
29	25 February 1978	Halifax Town	A	1–1	1,764	Carlton
30	4 March 1978	Torquay United	H	3–0	6,551	Sweetzer (2, 1 pen), Darke (og)
31	6 March 1978	Rochdale	H	4–0	7,215	McCulloch, Phillips (2, 1 pen), Sweetzer, Lloyd
32	11 March 1978	Southport	A	3–1	1,691	Phillips (2), McCulloch
33	14 March 1978	Scunthorpe United	A	1–1	3,053	Murray
34	18 March 1978	Hartlepool United	H	2–0	7,499	McCulloch, Phillips
35	24 March 1978	Southend United	A	1–2	11,810	Phillips
36	25 March 1978	Newport County	A	2–1	4,953	J. Graham, McCulloch
37	27 March 1978	Aldershot	H	2–0	12,579	Phillips (2, 1 pen)
38	1 April 1978	Huddersfield Town	A	3–1	6,345	Phillips (3)
39	3 April 1978	Stockport County	H	4–0	11,674	Phillips (2), McCulloch (2)
40	8 April 1978	Barnsley	H	2–0	12,139	Allder, Phillips (pen)
41	12 April 1978	Reading	A	0–0	7,384	
42	15 April 1978	Swansea City	A	1–2	16,152	W. Graham
43	18 April 1978	Doncaster Rovers	H	2–2	11,512	Phillips (2)
44	22 April 1978	Darlington	H	2–0	11,934	McCulloch, Phillips (pen)
45	25 April 1978	Watford	A	1–1	16,544	McCulloch
46	29 April 1978	Grimsby Town	A	1–2	4,712	Phillips

=== FA Cup ===
Round	Date	Opponent	Venue	Result	Attendance	Scorer(s)
1R	26 November 1977	Folkestone & Shepway	H	2–0	5,981	Phillips (2)
2R	17 December 1977	Swindon Town	A	1–2	8,447	Phillips (pen)

=== Football League Cup ===
Round	Date	Opponent	Venue	Result	Attendance	Scorer(s)
1R (1st leg)	13 August 1977	Crystal Palace	H	2–1	8,929	Sweetzer (2)
1R (2nd leg)	16 August 1977	Crystal Palace	A	1–5 (lost 6–3 on aggregate)	11,586	Phillips

- Sources: 100 Years of Brentford, The Big Brentford Book of the Seventies, Statto

== Playing squad ==
Players' ages are as of the opening day of the 1977–78 season.

Pos.	Name	Nat.	Date of birth (age)	Signed from	Signed in	Notes
Goalkeepers
GK	Len Bond	(England)	12 January 1954 (aged 23)	Bristol City	1977	
GK	Graham Cox	(England)	30 April 1959 (aged 18)	Youth	1975	
Defenders
DF	Michael Allen	(England)	30 March 1949 (aged 28)	Middlesbrough	1971	
DF	John Fraser	(England)	12 July 1953 (aged 24)	Fulham	1976	
DF	Pat Kruse	(England)	30 November 1953 (aged 23)	Torquay United	1977	
DF	Danis Salman	(England)	12 March 1960 (aged 17)	Youth	1975	
DF	Nigel Smith	(England)	3 July 1958 (aged 19)	Queens Park Rangers	1975	
DF	Barry Tucker	(Wales)	28 August 1952 (aged 24)	Northampton Town	1978	
Midfielders
MF	Doug Allder	(England)	30 December 1951 (aged 25)	Unattached	1977	
MF	Steve Aylott	(England)	3 September 1951 (aged 25)	Oxford United	1976	
MF	Dave Carlton	(England)	24 November 1952 (aged 24)	Northampton Town	1976	
MF	Jackie Graham (c)	(Scotland)	16 July 1946 (aged 31)	Guildford City	1970	
MF	Willie Graham	(Northern Ireland)	14 February 1959 (aged 18)	Northampton Town	1977	
MF	Barry Lloyd	(England)	19 February 1949 (aged 28)	Hereford United	1977	
MF	Gary Rolph	(England)	24 February 1960 (aged 17)	Youth	1976	
MF	Paul Shrubb	(England)	1 August 1955 (aged 22)	Hellenic	1977	
MF	Paul Walker	(England)	17 December 1960 (aged 16)	Youth	1976	
Forwards
FW	Tommy Baldwin	(England)	10 June 1945 (aged 32)	Unattached	1977	
FW	Andrew McCulloch	(England)	3 January 1950 (aged 27)	Oxford United	1976	
FW	John Murray	(England)	2 March 1948 (aged 29)	Reading	1978	
FW	Steve Phillips	(England)	4 August 1954 (aged 23)	Northampton Town	1977	
Players who left the club mid-season
MF	Terry Glynn	(England)	17 December 1958 (aged 18)	Orient	1977	Released
FW	Gordon Sweetzer	(Canada)	27 January 1957 (aged 20)	Queens Park Rangers	1975	Transferred to Cambridge United

- Sources: The Big Brentford Book of the Seventies, Timeless Bees

== Coaching staff ==
Name	Role
(England) Bill Dodgin Jr.	Manager
(England) Eddie Lyons	Physiotherapist
(England) Gordon Quinn	Chief Scout

== Statistics ==
=== Appearances and goals ===
Substitute appearances in brackets.

Pos	Nat	Name	League		FA Cup		League Cup		Total	
Pos	Nat	Name	Apps	Goals	Apps	Goals	Apps	Goals	Apps	Goals
GK	(England)	Len Bond	45	0	2	0	2	0	49	0
GK	(England)	Graham Cox	1	0	0	0	0	0	1	0
DF	(England)	Michael Allen	21	0	2	0	2	0	25	0
DF	(England)	John Fraser	19	0	1	0	2	0	22	0
DF	(England)	Pat Kruse	40	1	2	0	2	0	44	1
DF	(England)	Danis Salman	36 (1)	0	2	0	2	0	40 (1)	0
DF	(England)	Nigel Smith	8 (1)	0	0	0	0	0	8 (1)	0
DF	(Wales)	Barry Tucker	18	0	—		—		18	0
MF	(England)	Doug Allder	31	2	2	0	—		33	2
MF	(England)	Steve Aylott	1 (1)	0	0	0	0	0	1 (1)	0
MF	(England)	Dave Carlton	33	3	0	0	0	0	33	3
MF	(England)	Terry Glynn	0	0	—		0 (1)	0	0 (1)	0
MF	(Scotland)	Jackie Graham	35 (1)	2	2	0	2	0	39 (1)	2
MF	(Northern Ireland)	Willie Graham	28 (3)	2	1	0	—		29 (3)	2
MF	(England)	Barry Lloyd	26 (5)	4	2	0	2	0	30 (5)	4
MF	(England)	Gary Rolph	1 (3)	1	0 (1)	0	0	0	1 (4)	1
MF	(England)	Paul Shrubb	45	1	2	0	2	0	49	1
MF	(England)	Paul Walker	3 (2)	0	0	0	0	0	3 (2)	0
FW	(England)	Tommy Baldwin	4	1	0	0	—		4	1
FW	(England)	Andrew McCulloch	45	22	2	0	2	0	49	22
FW	(England)	John Murray	2 (3)	1	—		—		2 (3)	1
FW	(England)	Steve Phillips	46	32	2	3	2	1	50	36
FW	(Canada)	Gordon Sweetzer	18	12	0	0	2	2	20	14

- Players listed in italics left the club mid-season.
- Source: 100 Years of Brentford

=== Goalscorers ===
Pos.	Nat	Player	FL4	FAC	FLC	Total
FW	(England)	Steve Phillips	32	3	1	36
FW	(England)	Andrew McCulloch	22	0	0	22
FW	(Canada)	Gordon Sweetzer	12	0	2	14
MF	(England)	Barry Lloyd	4	0	0	4
MF	(England)	Dave Carlton	3	0	0	3
MF	(England)	Doug Allder	2	0	—	2
MF	(Northern Ireland)	Willie Graham	2	0	—	2
MF	(Scotland)	Jackie Graham	2	0	0	2
FW	(England)	John Murray	1	—	—	1
FW	(England)	Tommy Baldwin	1	0	—	1
DF	(England)	Pat Kruse	1	0	0	1
MF	(England)	Gary Rolph	1	0	0	1
MF	(England)	Paul Shrubb	1	0	0	1
Opponents			2	0	0	2
Total			86	3	3	92

- Players listed in italics left the club mid-season.
- Source: 100 Years of Brentford

=== Management ===
Name	Nat	From	To	Record All Comps					Record League				
Name	Nat	From	To	P	W	D	L	W %	P	W	D	L	W %
Bill Dodgin, Jr.	(England)	13 August 1977	29 April 1978	50	23	14	13	46.00	46	21	14	11	45.65

=== Summary ===
Games played	50 (46 Fourth Division, 2 FA Cup, 2 League Cup)
Games won	23 (21 Fourth Division, 1 FA Cup, 1 League Cup)
Games drawn	14 (14 Fourth Division, 0 FA Cup, 0 League Cup)
Games lost	13 (11 Fourth Division, 1 FA Cup, 1 League Cup)
Goals scored	92 (86 Fourth Division, 3 FA Cup, 3 League Cup)
Goals conceded	62 (54 Fourth Division, 2 FA Cup, 6 League Cup)
Clean sheets	15 (14 Fourth Division, 1 FA Cup, 0 League Cup)
Biggest league win	4–0 on two occasions; 5–1 versus Crewe Alexandra, 28 January 1978
Worst league defeat	3–0 versus Watford, 3 October 1977
Most appearances	50, Steve Phillips (42 Fourth Division, 2 FA Cup, 2 League Cup)
Top scorer (league)	32, Steve Phillips
Top scorer (all competitions)	36, Steve Phillips

== Transfers & loans ==
Players transferred in
Date	Pos.	Name	Previous club	Fee	Ref.
June 1977	MF	(England) Barry Lloyd	(England) Hereford United	Free	
August 1977	GK	(England) Len Bond	(England) Bristol City	£8,000	
August 1977	MF	(Northern Ireland) Willie Graham	(England) Northampton Town	Free	
October 1977	MF	(England) Doug Allder	Unattached	Trial	
October 1977	FW	(England) Tommy Baldwin	Unattached	Non-contract	
1977	MF	(England) Terry Glynn	(England) Orient	Trial	
January 1978	MF	(England) Dave Metchick	n/a	Non-contract	
February 1978	FW	(England) John Murray	(England) Reading	Nominal	
February 1978	DF	(England) David Silman	Unattached	Trial	
February 1978	DF	(Wales) Barry Tucker	(England) Northampton Town	£10,000	
Players transferred out
Date	Pos.	Name	Subsequent club	Fee	Ref.
8 March 1978	FW	(Canada) Gordon Sweetzer	(England) Cambridge United	£30,000	
Players loaned out
Date from	Pos.	Name	To	Date to	Ref.
May 1978	FW	(England) Andrew McCulloch	(United States) Oakland Stompers	August 1978	
Players released
Date	Pos.	Name	Subsequent club	Join date	Ref.
September 1977	MF	(England) Terry Glynn	(England) Ilford	1977	
1977	MF	(England) Terry Johnson	(England) Blyth Spartans	1977	
January 1978	MF	(England) Dave Metchick	n/a	n/a	
May 1978	MF	(England) Steve Aylott	Retired		
May 1978	MF	(England) Barry Lloyd	(United States) Houston Hurricane	1978	

== Awards ==
- Supporters' Player of the Year: Andrew McCulloch
- Players' Player of the Year: Andrew McCulloch
- Adidas Golden Boot: Steve Phillips
- Evening Standard Player of the Month: Steve Phillips (March 1978)
- Football League Fourth Division Manager of the Month: Bill Dodgin Jr. (March 1978)
