= Gordon Sweetzer =

Canadian former professional soccer player (born 1957)

Personal information
- Full name: Gordon Eric Peter Sweetzer
- Date of birth: 27 January 1957 (age 69)
- Place of birth: Toronto, Ontario, Canada
- Height: 1.80 m (5 ft 11 in)
- Position: Forward

Youth career
- –1975: Queens Park Rangers

Senior career*
Years	Team	Apps	(Gls)
1975–1978	Brentford	72	(40)
1978–1980	Cambridge United	9	(3)
1980–1981	Toronto Blizzard	41	(9)
1981–1982	Brentford	9	(1)
1982	Edmonton Drillers	12	(2)
Total		143	(55)

International career
1981	Canada	3	(0)

Managerial career
- 1990–1991: Staines Town
- * Club domestic league appearances and goals

Gordon Eric Peter Sweetzer (born 27 January 1957) is a Canadian former professional soccer player who played as a forward. In a short, injury-plagued career, he played in the Football League for Brentford, Cambridge United and in the North American Soccer League for Toronto Blizzard and Edmonton Drillers. Sweetzer won three caps for Canada and later became a manager and coach. As a player, he was described as "an aggressive, all-action, bustling striker, with little finesse about his game".

== Club career ==
=== Brentford (1975–1978) ===
A forward, Sweetzer began his career in the youth system at Queens Park Rangers, before joining Fourth Division club Brentford on a one-month trial in July 1975. The trial was extended for a second month and he signed a professional contract in September 1975. Sweetzer was named as the substitute for a league fixture versus Huddersfield Town late in the month and made his professional debut when he replaced Dave Simmons during the match. He scored the first senior goal of his career with a late header in the 2–1 defeat. He went on to establish himself in the team and finished the 1975–76 season with 31 appearances and seven goals.

Sweetzer began the 1976–77 season with niggling injuries, but after returning to fitness he showed prolific form, scoring 23 goals in 28 appearances to pull the Bees away from what would have been an almost-certain re-election scenario. He was voted the club's Supporters' Player of the Year. During the 1977–78 season, Sweetzer was part of a prolific forward line that also included Steve Phillips and Andrew McCulloch and despite being affected by injuries, he scored 14 goals in 20 appearances. With promotion to the Third Division almost assured, he was transferred out of the club in April 1978. In just shy of three seasons at Griffin Park, Sweetzer scored 44 goals in 79 appearances.

=== Later career (1978–1982) ===
Sweetzer transferred to high-flying Third Division club Cambridge United for a £30,000 fee in April 1978, a move which reunited him with manager John Docherty, who had signed him at Brentford. Sweetzer celebrated promotion to the Second Division with the club at the end of the 1977–78 season, but the remainder of his spell would be plagued by a long-standing knee injury and he left the club in 1980. Sweetzer returned to his native Canada to play for North American Soccer League club Toronto Blizzard in 1980 and 1981, before closing out his career in 1982 with a short comeback at Brentford and a spell with North American Soccer League club Edmonton Drillers.

== International career ==
Sweetzer won four caps for Canada in 1981.

== Managerial and coaching career ==
Sweetzer served as manager at Isthmian League Premier Division club Staines Town between November 1990 and June 1991. He later coached at Toronto High Park.

== Personal life ==
Sweetzer's brothers Billy and Jimmy also played professional football.

== Career statistics ==
Appearances and goals by club, season and competition
Club	Season	League			National cup (Note: Includes FA Cup)		League cup (Note: Includes Football League Cup)		Total	
Club	Season	Division	Apps	Goals	Apps	Goals	Apps	Goals	Apps	Goals
Brentford	1975–76	Fourth Division	27	5	4	2	0	0	31	7
Brentford	1976–77	Fourth Division	27	23	1	0	0	0	28	23
Brentford	1977–78	Fourth Division	18	12	0	0	2	2	20	14
Brentford	Total		72	40	5	2	2	2	79	44
Cambridge United	Total		9	3	0	0	0	0	9	3
Toronto Blizzard	1980	North American Soccer League	22	5	—		—		22	5
Toronto Blizzard	1981	North American Soccer League	19	4	—		—		19	4
Toronto Blizzard	Total		41	9	—		—		41	9
Brentford	1981–82	Third Division	9	1	—		—		9	1
Brentford	Total		81	41	5	2	2	2	88	45
Edmonton Drillers	1982	North American Soccer League	12	2	—		—		12	2
Career total			143	55	5	2	2	2	150	59

== Honours ==
Brentford

- Football League Fourth Division fourth-place promotion: 1977–78

Individual

- Brentford Supporters' Player of the Year: 1976–77
