= Lee Holmes (footballer, born 1955) =

English footballer

Personal information
- Full name: Lee John Holmes
- Date of birth: 28 September 1955 (age 71)
- Place of birth: Aveley, England
- Position: Forward

Youth career
- West Ham United

Senior career*
Years	Team	Apps	(Gls)
1978–1979	Haringey Borough		
1979–1980	Brentford	28	(6)
1980–1984	Enfield		
1984–1987	Wealdstone	87	(16)
1987–1988	Dagenham	41	(6)
- Dartford
- Leyton-Wingate
- * Club domestic league appearances and goals

Lee John Holmes (born 28 September 1955) is an English retired footballer who played as forward in the Football League for Brentford. He later played in the highest levels of non-League football for Enfield, Wealdstone and Dagenham.

== Career ==
=== Early years ===
A forward, Holmes began his career in the academy at First Division club West Ham United. He was released without making a senior appearance and dropped into non-League football to sign for Athenian League club Haringey Borough, with whom he remained until August 1979.

=== Brentford ===
Holmes got his chance in League football when he signed for Third Division club Brentford on a part-time contract in August 1979. He scored on his debut in a League Cup first round defeat to Southend United and went on to score seven goals in 30 appearances during the 1979–80 season. Holmes' value to the team was such that manager Bill Dodgin offered him a full-time contract, which he declined and he departed Griffin Park.

=== Enfield ===
Holmes dropped back into non-League football to sign for Isthmian League Premier Division club Enfield in 1980 for a £5,000 fee. He helped the Es to a second-place finish and promotion to the Alliance Premier League at the end of the 1980–81 season. Holmes had a successful time on the top rung of non-League football with Enfield, winning the 1981–82 FA Trophy and the 1982–83 Alliance Premier League championship. He made 100 Alliance Premier League appearances and scored 19 goals for Enfield, before departing at the end of the 1983–84 season.

=== Wealdstone ===
Holmes signed for high-flying Alliance Premier League club Wealdstone in 1984 and had a dream start to his career with the club, winning the 1984–85 Alliance Premier League, the FA Trophy and the Middlesex Senior Cup, though the Stones would fail to win promotion to the Football League due their inadequate Lower Mead ground. He remained with the club until 1987, making 87 league appearances and scoring six goals.

=== Later non-league career ===
Holmes signed for Conference club Dagenham in 1987 and played for one season before ending his career with spells at Dartford and Leyton-Wingate.

== Personal life ==
During his career, Holmes worked as a civil engineer. He married his wife on the same day as a Brentford match and dashed to the ceremony, across London to Barking on a motorbike, after the game finished.

== Career statistics ==
Appearances and goals by club, season and competition
Club	Season	League			FA Cup		League Cup		Total	
Club	Season	Division	Apps	Goals	Apps	Goals	Apps	Goals	Apps	Goals
Brentford	1979–80	Third Division	28	6	0	0	2	1	30	7
Career total			28	6	0	0	2	1	30	7

== Honours ==
Enfield

- Alliance Premier League: 1982–83
- FA Trophy: 1981–82

Wealdstone

- Alliance Premier League: 1984–85
- FA Trophy: 1984–85
- Middlesex Senior Cup: 1984–85
