= Dave Carlton =

English footballer

Personal information
- Full name: David George Carlton
- Date of birth: 24 November 1952 (age 73)
- Place of birth: Stepney, England
- Position: Midfielder

Youth career
- –1969: West Ham United
- 1969–1972: Fulham

Senior career*
Years	Team	Apps	(Gls)
1972–1973	Fulham	9	(0)
1972	→ Dallas Tornado (loan)	9	(1)
1973–1976	Northampton Town	104	(6)
1976–1980	Brentford	140	(7)
1980–1982	Northampton Town	76	(1)
- Wealdstone
Total		338	(15)
- * Club domestic league appearances and goals

David George Carlton (born 24 November 1952) is an English retired professional footballer who made 320 appearances as a midfielder in the Football League, most notably for Northampton Town and Brentford.

== Playing career ==
=== Early years ===
Carlton began his career as an apprentice at West Ham United and moved to Fulham in 1969. He made his debut during the 1971–72 Second Division season and made eight appearances in total. After a loan spell at North American Soccer League club Dallas Tornado in 1972, Carlton returned to Fulham, but made just one further appearance before his departure in October 1973.

=== Northampton Town ===
Carlton signed for Fourth Division club Northampton Town in October 1973. He made just six league appearances in what remained of 1973–74, but became a regular pick from the beginning of the 1974–75 season and helped the Cobblers to promotion to the Third Division a year later. Northampton Town were relegated straight back to the Fourth Division and Carlton departed the club early in the 1976–77 season. He made 104 league appearances and scored six goals during nearly three years at the County Ground.

=== Brentford ===
Carlton reunited with his former Fulham and Northampton Town manager Bill Dodgin at Fourth Division club Brentford in October 1976 and signed for a £3,000 fee. He helped the Bees to promotion to the Third Division in the 1977–78 season and unlike with Northampton, the club consolidated its position at the higher level. Carlton departed Griffin Park at the end of the 1979–80 season and made 148 appearances and scored seven goals during nearly four years with the Bees.

=== Return to Northampton Town ===
In September 1980, Carlton dropped back to the Fourth Division, when he followed Bill Dodgin back to Northampton Town. He made 76 league appearances before departing in 1982.

=== Wealdstone ===
Carlton ended his career with a spell at Alliance Premier League club Wealdstone.

== Personal life ==
After retiring from football, Carlton settled in Little Billing and began a business selling golf equipment.

== Career statistics ==
Appearances and goals by club, season and competition
Club	Season	League			National Cup		League Cup		Total	
Club	Season	Division	Apps	Goals	Apps	Goals	Apps	Goals	Apps	Goals
Fulham	1971–72	Second Division	8	0	0	0	2	0	10	0
Fulham	1972–73	Second Division	1	0	0	0	0	0	1	0
Fulham	Total		9	0	0	0	2	0	11	0
Dallas Tornado (loan)	1972	North American Soccer League	9	1	—		—		9	1
Brentford	1976–77	Fourth Division	32	0	2	0	—		34	0
Brentford	1977–78	Fourth Division	33	3	0	0	0	0	33	3
Brentford	1978–79	Third Division	37	2	1	0	2	0	40	2
Brentford	1979–80	Third Division	38	2	1	0	2	0	41	2
Brentford	Total		140	7	4	0	4	0	148	7
Career total			149	7	4	0	6	0	159	7

== Honours ==
Northampton Town

- Football League Fourth Division second-place promotion: 1975–76

Brentford

- Football League Fourth Division fourth-place promotion: 1977–78
