= Bill Dodgin =

Bill Dodgin may refer to:

- Bill Dodgin Sr. (1909–1999), footballer and manager of Southampton, Brentford, Bristol Rovers and Fulham, 1949–1953
- Bill Dodgin Jr. (1931–2000), his son, footballer for Arsenal and manager of Brentford, Fulham and QPR, at various dates between 1968 and 1974
