= John Fraser (footballer, born 1953) =

English footballer

Personal information
- Full name: John Fraser
- Date of birth: 12 July 1953 (age 73)
- Place of birth: White City, England
- Positions: Full back; utility player

Youth career
- 1967–1971: Fulham

Senior career*
| Years | Team | Apps | (Gls) |
| 1971–1976 | Fulham | 56 | (1) |
| 1976–1980 | Brentford | 123 | (6) |
| 1980–1981 | Oxford City | 42 | (1) |
| Total | | 221 | (8) |
- * Club domestic league appearances and goals

John Fraser (born 12 July 1953) is an English former footballer who played as a full back in the Football League for Brentford and Fulham.

== Career ==
=== Fulham ===
After being spotted playing for his school team, Fraser entered the youth system at First Division club Fulham at the age of 14 in 1967. He began his career as a midfielder, but switched to full back under reserve team manager George Cohen and signed his first professional contract in 1971. He made his senior debut during the 1971–72 Second Division season and gradually built on his appearance record year-by-year to play 25 games during the 1974–75 season. An injury to Les Strong allowed him a place in the starting lineup for the 1975 FA Cup Final, which was lost 2–0 to West Ham United. Fraser fell out of favour with manager Alec Stock during the 1975–76 pre-season and departed the club at the end of the season. He made 65 appearances and scored one goal as a first team player at Craven Cottage.

=== Brentford ===
Fraser dropped to the Fourth Division to sign for Fulham's neighbours Brentford in July 1976 on a free transfer. He was a near ever-present during the 1976–77 season and was used in a utility role by manager Bill Dodgin Jr, playing both full back positions and on the wing. He was a regular until a groin injury ruined a successful 1977–78 season, in which he helped the Bees to automatic promotion to the Third Division by filling in at the midfield and at inside forward. He rejected a new contract and departed Griffin Park early in the 1980–81 season, despite having missed just four matches of the previous season. Fraser made 131 appearances and scored seven goals during three seasons with Brentford.

=== Oxford City ===
Fraser closed out his career in non-League football with Isthmian League First Division club Oxford City. He made 42 appearances and scoring one goal during the 1980–81 season before retiring from football.

== Personal life ==
Fraser completed The Knowledge while a Brentford player and became a black cab driver after retiring from football.

== Career statistics ==
Appearances and goals by club, season and competition
| Club | Season | League | | | FA Cup | | League Cup | | Total | |
| Club | Season | Division | Apps | Goals | Apps | Goals | Apps | Goals | Apps | Goals |
|---|---|---|---|---|---|---|---|---|---|---|
| Fulham | 1971–72 | Second Division | 9 | 0 | 0 | 0 | 0 | 0 | 9 | 0 |
| Fulham | 1972–73 | Second Division | 4 | 0 | 1 | 0 | 0 | 0 | 5 | 0 |
| Fulham | 1973–74 | Second Division | 17 | 0 | 3 | 0 | 0 | 0 | 20 | 0 |
| Fulham | 1974–75 | Second Division | 20 | 1 | 4 | 0 | 1 | 0 | 25 | 1 |
| Fulham | 1975–76 | Second Division | 5 | 0 | 0 | 0 | 1 | 0 | 6 | 0 |
| Fulham | Total | | 55 | 1 | 8 | 0 | 2 | 0 | 65 | 2 |
| Brentford | 1976–77 | Fourth Division | 39 | 2 | 2 | 1 | 0 | 0 | 41 | 3 |
| Brentford | 1977–78 | Fourth Division | 19 | 0 | 1 | 0 | 2 | 0 | 22 | 0 |
| Brentford | 1978–79 | Third Division | 23 | 0 | 0 | 0 | 1 | 0 | 24 | 0 |
| Brentford | 1979–80 | Third Division | 42 | 4 | 1 | 0 | 2 | 0 | 45 | 4 |
| Brentford | Total | | 123 | 6 | 4 | 1 | 5 | 0 | 132 | 7 |
| Career total | | | 178 | 7 | 12 | 1 | 7 | 0 | 197 | 9 |

== Honours ==
Fulham

- FA Cup runner-up: 1974–75

Brentford

- Football League Fourth Division fourth-place promotion: 1977–78
