= Allan Glover =

English footballer (born 1950)

Personal information
- Full name: Allan Richard Glover
- Date of birth: 21 October 1950 (age 76)
- Place of birth: Staines, England
- Positions: Inside forward; winger; midfielder

Youth career
- –1968: Queens Park Rangers

Senior career*
Years	Team	Apps	(Gls)
1968–1969	Queens Park Rangers	6	(0)
1969–1977	West Bromwich Albion	92	(9)
1976	→ Southend United (loan)	1	(0)
1976	→ Brentford (loan)	6	(0)
1977–1978	Orient	37	(5)
1978–1980	Brentford	23	(2)
- Staines Town
- * Club domestic league appearances and goals

Allan Richard Glover (born 21 October 1950) is an English retired professional footballer, best remembered for his eight years in the Football League with West Bromwich Albion. An inside forward and winger, he also played for Orient, Brentford, Queens Park Rangers and Southend United.

== Club career ==
=== Queens Park Rangers ===
Glover began his career at Queens Park Rangers and made seven appearances during a disastrous 1968–69 season, which saw Rangers relegated from the First Division. He departed Rangers in June 1969.

=== West Bromwich Albion ===
Glover signed for First Division club West Bromwich Albion in June 1969 for a fee £70,000, with Albion winger Clive Clark transferring the other way to Loftus Road as a makeweight. Glover's progression at The Hawthorns was slow and he failed to break through into the team until 1973–74, when he made 42 appearances and scored five goals. He made 41 appearances and scored two goals during the 1974–75 season, before falling out of favour with new manager Johnny Giles.

Glover joined Third Division club Southend United on loan midway through the 1975–76 season. Glover had one of the shortest careers on record at Roots Hall, due to being carried off injured after 30 seconds on his debut on New Year's Day 1976. Glover signed for Fourth Division club Brentford on loan in October 1976. He impressed enough during his six appearances for manager Bill Dodgin to bid for a permanent transfer, but a terms failed to be agreed. Glover departed West Bromwich Albion in March 1977, having made 107 appearances and scored 10 goals for the club.

=== Orient ===
Glover and West Bromwich Albion teammate Joe Mayo transferred to Second Division club Orient in March 1977, as the makeweights in the deal which took Laurie Cunningham to The Hawthorns for £110,000. Glover failed to win a regular place in the first team at Brisbane Road and he made 37 league appearances and scored five goals during an 18-month stay.

=== Return to Brentford ===
Now playing in the Third Division, Brentford manager Bill Dodgin finally signed Glover on a permanent contract in November 1978. He failed to challenge for a regular first team place and made just 26 appearances, scoring two goals, before being released at the end of the 1979–80 season.

=== Staines Town ===
After his release from Brentford, Glover dropped into non-League football and joined hometown Isthmian League Premier Division club Staines Town.

== Career statistics ==
Appearances and goals by club, season and competition
Club	Season	League			FA Cup		League Cup		Other		Total	
Club	Season	Division	Apps	Goals	Apps	Goals	Apps	Goals	Apps	Goals	Apps	Goals
Queens Park Rangers	1968–69	First Division	6	0	1	0	0	0	—		7	0
West Bromwich Albion	1969–70	First Division	2	1	0	0	0	0	2 (Note: Appearances in Anglo-Italian Cup)	1	4	2
West Bromwich Albion	1970–71	First Division	0	0	0	0	1	0	1	0	2	0
West Bromwich Albion	1971–72	First Division	8	0	0	0	0	0	—		8	0
West Bromwich Albion	1972–73	First Division	5	1	0	0	0	0	—		5	1
West Bromwich Albion	1973–74	Second Division	37	5	4	0	1	0	—		42	5
West Bromwich Albion	1974–75	Second Division	36	2	0	0	3	0	2 (Note: Appearances in Texaco Cup)	0	41	2
West Bromwich Albion	1975–76	Second Division	3	0	0	0	1	0	—		4	0
West Bromwich Albion	1976–77	First Division	1	0	0	0	0	0	—		1	0
West Bromwich Albion	Total		92	9	4	0	6	0	5	1	117	10
Southend United (loan)	1975–76	Third Division	1	0	0	0	—		—		1	0
Brentford (loan)	1976–77	Fourth Division	6	0	—		—		—		6	0
Brentford	1978–79	Third Division	19	2	1	0	—		—		20	2
Brentford	1979–80	Third Division	4	0	0	0	2	0	—		6	0
Brentford	Total		29	2	1	0	2	0	—		32	2
Career total			128	11	6	0	8	0	5	1	157	12
