= John Murray (footballer, born 1948) =

English footballer and manager

Personal information
- Full name: John Murray
- Date of birth: 2 March 1948 (age 78)
- Place of birth: Newcastle upon Tyne, England
- Position: Winger

Senior career*
| Years | Team | Apps | (Gls) |
| 1965–1970 | Burnley | 22 | (6) |
| 1970–1971 | Blackpool | 9 | (1) |
| 1971–1974 | Bury | 126 | (37) |
| 1974–1978 | Reading | 131 | (44) |
| 1978 | Brentford | 5 | (1) |

Managerial career
- 1982–1984: Newbury Town
- Wallington
- * Club domestic league appearances and goals

John Murray (born 2 March 1948) is an English retired professional footballer who played as a winger in the Football League, most notably for Reading and Bury. He later served as youth team manager at Northampton Town.

== Career statistics ==
Appearances and goals by club, season and competition
| Club | Season | League | | | FA Cup | | League Cup | | Total | |
| Club | Season | Division | Apps | Goals | Apps | Goals | Apps | Goals | Apps | Goals |
|---|---|---|---|---|---|---|---|---|---|---|
| Burnley | 1966–67 | First Division | 3 | 0 | 0 | 0 | 0 | 0 | 3 | 0 |
| Burnley | 1968–69 | First Division | 13 | 5 | 0 | 0 | 5 | 4 | 18 | 9 |
| Burnley | 1969–70 | First Division | 6 | 1 | 0 | 0 | 0 | 0 | 6 | 1 |
| Burnley | Total | | 22 | 6 | 0 | 0 | 5 | 4 | 27 | 10 |
| Blackpool | 1970–71 | First Division | 2 | 0 | 0 | 0 | 0 | 0 | 2 | 0 |
| Reading | 1974–75 | Fourth Division | 44 | 12 | 1 | 0 | 6 | 1 | 51 | 13 |
| Reading | 1975–76 | Fourth Division | 37 | 15 | 1 | 0 | 2 | 0 | 40 | 15 |
| Reading | 1976–77 | Third Division | 42 | 16 | 3 | 1 | 3 | 2 | 48 | 19 |
| Reading | 1977–78 | Fourth Division | 8 | 1 | 0 | 0 | 3 | 1 | 11 | 2 |
| Reading | Total | | 131 | 44 | 5 | 1 | 14 | 4 | 150 | 49 |
| Brentford | 1977–78 | Fourth Division | 5 | 1 | — | | — | | 5 | 1 |
| Career total | | | 160 | 51 | 5 | 1 | 19 | 8 | 184 | 60 |

== Honours ==
=== As a player ===
Reading

- Football League Fourth Division third-place promotion: 1975–76

=== As a manager ===
Newbury Town

- Athenian League: 1982–83
