= Barry Lloyd =

English footballer (1949–2024)

Personal information
- Full name: Barry David Lloyd
- Date of birth: 19 February 1949
- Place of birth: Hillingdon, England
- Date of death: 28 September 2024 (aged 75)
- Height: 5 ft 8 in (1.73 m)
- Position: Midfielder

Youth career
- Arsenal
- –1966: Chelsea

Senior career*
Years	Team	Apps	(Gls)
1966–1968	Chelsea	10	(0)
1968–1976	Fulham	257	(29)
1976–1977	Hereford United	14	(0)
1977–1978	Brentford	31	(4)
1978	Houston Hurricane	11	(0)
Total		323	(33)

International career
- England Youth

Managerial career
- 1978–1981: Yeovil Town
- 1981–1986: Worthing
- 1987–1993: Brighton & Hove Albion
- 2001–2003: Worthing
- * Club domestic league appearances and goals

Barry David Lloyd (19 February 1949 – 28 September 2024) was an English professional footballer and manager. As a player, he most notably played as a midfielder in the Football League for Fulham, for whom he was captain and made over 280 appearances for the club. He also played League football for Brentford, Hereford United and Chelsea. After his retirement as a player, Lloyd managed Brighton & Hove Albion and non-League clubs Worthing and Yeovil Town.

== Playing career ==
A midfielder, Lloyd began his senior career at First Division club Chelsea. He failed to break into the first team before joining Fulham in December 1968, in a player-exchange deal which saw John Dempsey move to Chelsea for a £70,000 fee. Lloyd made 286 appearances and scored 30 goals during 7 1/2 seasons at Craven Cottage and captained the club to promotion from the Third Division in the 1970–71 season. He was an unused substitute during the 2–0 1975 FA Cup Final defeat to West Ham United. Lloyd wound down his career with spells at Hereford United, Brentford and Houston Hurricane, before retiring in 1978.

== Managerial career ==
=== Yeovil Town ===
Lloyd began his management career at Southern League Premier Division club Yeovil Town in August 1978. During the 1978–79 season, he oversaw a mid-table finish and won the Somerset Premier Cup. The Glovers were transferred to the new Alliance Premier League for the 1979–80 season and with the club's league form mixed, he was sacked in January 1981.

=== Worthing ===
Lloyd joined Isthmian League Second Division club Worthing in 1981 and won a double-promotion in his first two seasons in charge, with top-spot finishes in the Second and First Divisions respectively elevating the club to the Premier Division for the 1983–84 season. The team finished runners-up in 1983–84 and 1984–85, but failed to achieve promotion to the Alliance Premier League before Lloyd's departure at the end of the 1985–86 season.

=== Brighton & Hove Albion ===
Lloyd returned to the Football League when he joined Second Division club Brighton & Hove Albion as assistant to manager Alan Mullery in 1986. After Mullery was sacked in January 1987, Lloyd was promoted into the role, but he could not prevent Brighton's relegation to the Third Division at the end of the 1986–87 season. In his first full season as manager, Lloyd won immediate promotion back to the Second Division with a runners-up finish, largely thanks to 32-goal forward Garry Nelson. Two successful battles against relegation followed, before Lloyd guided the club to the 1991 Second Division play-off final, which was lost 3–1 to Notts County. One year later, Albion suffered relegation back to the third-tier and the club was in a financial crisis after years of over-spending. A 9th-place finish followed at the end of the 1992–93 season and Lloyd resigned in December 1993.

=== Return to Worthing ===
Lloyd rejoined Worthing, then in the Isthmian League First Division, as caretaker manager in November 2001 and he was appointed to the role full-time in December. He achieved two mid-tables finishes before being sacked in July 2003.

== Other roles ==
Lloyd began taking his coaching badges while a 17-year-old at Chelsea. From 1993 to 2001 and 2001 to 2007 he worked for various clubs in differing roles, before returning to Brighton & Hove Albion as chief scout in September 2007.

== Career statistics ==
Appearances and goals by club, season and competition
Club	Season	League			National cup		League cup		Total	
Club	Season	Division	Apps	Goals	Apps	Goals	Apps	Goals	Apps	Goals
Chelsea	1966–67	First Division	4	0	0	0	0	0	4	0
Chelsea	1967–68	First Division	1	0	0	0	0	0	1	0
Chelsea	1968–69	First Division	5	0	0	0	0	0	5	0
Chelsea	Total		10	0	0	0	0	0	10	0
Fulham	1968–69	Second Division	15	3	—		—		15	3
Fulham	1969–70	Third Division	30	7	0	0	0	0	30	7
Fulham	1970–71	Third Division	46	9	1	0	6	0	53	9
Fulham	1971–72	Second Division	42	3	3	0	2	0	47	3
Fulham	1972–73	Second Division	32	1	0	0	4	1	36	2
Fulham	1973–74	Second Division	34	2	2	0	4	0	40	2
Fulham	1974–75	Second Division	25	1	2	0	3	0	30	1
Fulham	1975–76	Second Division	25	3	0	0	2	0	27	3
Fulham	Total		257	29	8	0	21	1	286	30
Hereford United	1976–77	Second Division	14	0	1	0	0	0	15	0
Brentford	1977–78	Fourth Division	31	4	2	0	2	0	35	4
Houston Hurricane	1978	North American Soccer League	11	0	—		—		11	0
Career total			323	33	11	0	23	1	357	34

== Honours ==
=== As a player ===
Fulham

- Football League Third Division second-place promotion: 1970–71

Brentford

- Football League Fourth Division fourth-place promotion: 1977–78

=== As a manager ===
Brighton & Hove Albion

- Football League Third Division second-place promotion: 1987–88

Worthing

- Isthmian League First Division: 1982–83
- Isthmian League Second Division: 1981–82

Yeovil Town

- Somerset Premier Cup: 1978–79
