= 1965–66 Carlisle United F.C. season =

Carlisle United F.C.
1965–66 season
- Manager: Alan Ashman
- Stadium: Brunton Park
- Second Division: 14th
- FA Cup: Fourth Round
- League Cup: Second Round

For the 1965–66 season, Carlisle United F.C. competed in Football League Division Two.

== Results & fixtures ==
=== Football League Second Division ===
==== League table ====
Pos	Team	Pld	W	D	L	GF	GA	GAv	Pts	Qualification or relegation
1	Manchester City (C, P)	42	22	15	5	76	44	1.727	59	Promotion to the First Division
2	Southampton (P)	42	22	10	10	85	56	1.518	54	Promotion to the First Division
3	Coventry City	42	20	13	9	73	53	1.377	53	
4	Huddersfield Town	42	19	13	10	62	36	1.722	51	
5	Bristol City	42	17	17	8	63	48	1.313	51	
6	Wolverhampton Wanderers	42	20	10	12	87	61	1.426	50	
7	Rotherham United	42	16	14	12	75	74	1.014	46	
8	Derby County	42	16	11	15	71	68	1.044	43	
9	Bolton Wanderers	42	16	9	17	62	59	1.051	41	
10	Birmingham City	42	16	9	17	70	75	0.933	41	
11	Crystal Palace	42	14	13	15	47	52	0.904	41	
12	Portsmouth	42	16	8	18	74	78	0.949	40	
13	Norwich City	42	12	15	15	52	52	1.000	39	
14	Carlisle United	42	17	5	20	60	63	0.952	39	
15	Ipswich Town	42	15	9	18	58	66	0.879	39	
16	Charlton Athletic	42	12	14	16	61	70	0.871	38	
17	Preston North End	42	11	15	16	62	70	0.886	37	
18	Plymouth Argyle	42	12	13	17	54	63	0.857	37	
19	Bury	42	14	7	21	62	76	0.816	35	
20	Cardiff City	42	12	10	20	71	91	0.780	34	
21	Middlesbrough (R)	42	10	13	19	58	86	0.674	33	Relegation to the Third Division
22	Leyton Orient (R)	42	5	13	24	38	80	0.475	23	Relegation to the Third Division

Rules for classification: 1) Points; 2) Goal average; 3) Goals scored
(C) Champions; (P) Promoted; (R) Relegated

==== Matches ====
Match Day	Date	Opponent	H/A	Score	Carlisle United Scorer(s)	Attendance
1	21 August	Norwich City	H	4–1		
2	25 August	Southampton	A	0–1		
3	28 August	Wolverhampton Wanderers	A	0–3		
4	31 August	Southampton	H	1–0		
5	3 September	Rotherham United	H	1–0		
6	7 September	Derby County	H	2–1		
7	11 September	Manchester City	A	1–2		
8	15 September	Derby County	A	1–3		
9	17 September	Bristol City	H	5–0		
10	25 September	Coventry City	A	2–3		
11	2 October	Preston North End	H	0–2		
12	9 October	Charlton Athletic	A	2–3		
13	16 October	Plymouth Argyle	H	1–3		
14	23 October	Portsmouth	A	1–4		
15	30 October	Bolton Wanderers	H	1–1		
16	6 November	Ipswich Town	A	0–1		
17	13 November	Birmingham City	H	1–0		
18	20 November	Leyton Orient	A	1–2		
19	4 December	Huddersfield Town	A	0–2		
20	11 December	Crystal Palace	H	3–1		
21	27 December	Bury	H	4–1		
22	1 January	Charlton Athletic	H	3–1		
23	8 January	Birmingham City	A	1–2		
24	15 January	Portsmouth	H	2–1		
25	29 January	Norwich City	A	0–2		
26	5 February	Wolverhampton Wanderers	H	2–1		
27	26 February	Manchester City	H	1–2		
28	8 March	Middlesbrough	H	2–1		
29	12 March	Bristol City	A	0–2		
30	14 March	Plymouth Argyle	A	0–0		
31	18 March	Coventry City	H	2–2		
32	2 April	Ipswich Town	H	3–1		
33	8 April	Cardiff City	A	1–1		
34	12 April	Cardiff City	H	2–0		
35	15 April	Leyton Orient	H	1–0		
36	23 April	Middlesbrough	A	2–0		
37	25 April	Preston North End	A	1–2		
38	30 April	Huddersfield Town	H	2–0		
39	4 May	Bolton Wanderers	A	0–4		
40	7 May	Crystal Palace	A	0–2		
41	10 May	Bury	A	1–2		
42	12 May	Rotherham United	A	3–3		

=== Football League Cup ===
Round	Date	Opponent	H/A	Score	Carlisle United Scorer(s)	Attendance
R2	21 September	Charlton Athletic	A	1–4		

=== FA Cup ===
Round	Date	Opponent	H/A	Score	Carlisle United Scorer(s)	Attendance
R3	22 January	Crystal Palace	H	3–0		
R4	12 February	Shrewsbury Town	A	0–0		
R4 R	15 February	Shrewsbury Town	H	1–1		
R4 2R	21 February	Shrewsbury Town	N	3–4		
