= Doug Allder =

English footballer (born 1951)

Personal information
- Full name: Douglas Stewart Allder
- Date of birth: 30 December 1951 (age 74)
- Place of birth: Hammersmith, England
- Height: 5 ft 10 in (1.78 m)
- Position: Left winger

Youth career
- 1968–1969: Millwall

Senior career*
Years	Team	Apps	(Gls)
1969–1975	Millwall	203	(10)
1975–1977	Orient	41	(0)
1977	Torquay United	0	(0)
1977	Watford	1	(0)
1977–1980	Brentford	88	(2)
1980–1981	Tooting & Mitcham United	21	(1)
1981	Walton & Hersham		
1981–1982	Staines Town		
Total		354	(13)

International career
- England Youth
- * Club domestic league appearances and goals

Douglas Stewart Allder (born 30 December 1951 in Hammersmith, London) is an English former professional footballer who made over 200 appearances in the Football League for Millwall as a left winger. He was capped by England at youth level and is a member of the Millwall Hall of Fame.

== Playing career ==
=== Millwall ===
Allder began his career with Second Division club Millwall and signed apprentice terms in April 1968 for £4 a week. He signed a professional contract in October 1969, worth £20 a week. He made his debut and broke into the team during the 1969–70 season, making 24 appearances. A dispute with Benny Fenton in 1971 saw Allder play on a week-to-week contract and he nearly moved to play under Gordon Jago at divisional rivals Queens Park Rangers. The move was cancelled after Jago replaced Fenton as Millwall manager, which meant Allder remained at The Den. The Lions occasionally challenged for promotion to First Division, but relegation to Third Division at the end of the 1974–75 season saw Allder depart the club. In his six years with Millwall he made 227 appearances and scored 12 goals. Allder is a member of the Millwall Hall of Fame.

=== Orient ===
In July 1975, Allder moved to Second Division club Orient in exchange for Terry Brisley and Barrie Fairbrother. He left Orient at the end of the 1976–77 season, after making 53 appearances without scoring. Looking back in 2002, Allder said "I knew straight away it was a bad move. I wasn't happy there".

=== Free agent ===
Allder had a one-month trial with Fourth Division club Torquay United in August 1977 and made one appearance as a substitute for Lindsay Parsons in a League Cup tie away at Cardiff City. In September 1977, he had a month-long trial with Watford and made a single appearance away at Rochdale, in which he was substituted at half-time. Watford went on to win the 1977–78 Fourth Division title and Allder received a winners' medal from chairman Elton John after the final game of the season against Brentford.

=== Brentford ===
In October 1977, Allder joined Fourth Division club Brentford on trial. He quickly became the regular left winger in the team and signed a contract. The Bees were promoted to the Third Division at the end of the season, after securing a fourth-place finish. Allder had an infamous brawl with Sheffield United's Mick Speight during a match at Griffin Park in November 1979, which resulted in the fight spilling over into the Sheffield United dugout and both players being sent off. Allder was released at the end of the 1979–80 season and made 95 appearances and scored three goals during his time at Griffin Park.

=== Non-League football ===
Allder joined Isthmian League club Tooting & Mitcham in 1980. He moved to Staines Town in March 1981, before moving to Walton & Hersham.

== Coaching career ==
In 1992, Allder was working in the Millwall Centre of Excellence.

== Personal life ==
As of 2002, Allder was working at Heathrow Airport.

== Career statistics ==
Appearances and goals by club, season and competition
Club	Season	League			FA Cup		League Cup		Total	
Club	Season	Division	Apps	Goals	Apps	Goals	Apps	Goals	Apps	Goals
Millwall	1969–70	Second Division	23	0	1	0	0	0	24	0
Millwall	1970–71	Second Division	38	3	1	0	3	0	42	3
Millwall	1971–72	Second Division	40	4	3	0	1	0	44	4
Millwall	1972–73	Second Division	40	1	3	0	3	0	46	2
Millwall	1973–74	Second Division	30	1	2	0	5	1	37	2
Millwall	1974–75	Second Division	32	1	2	0	0	0	34	1
Millwall	Total		203	10	12	0	12	1	227	11
Torquay United	1977–78	Fourth Division	0	0	—		1	0	1	0
Watford	1977–78	Fourth Division	1	0	—		—		1	0
Brentford	1977–78	Fourth Division	31	2	2	0	—		33	2
Brentford	1978–79	Third Division	30	0	0	0	2	0	32	0
Brentford	1979–80	Third Division	27	0	1	0	2	1	30	1
Brentford	Total		88	2	3	0	4	1	95	3
Career total			292	12	15	0	17	2	324	14

== Honours ==
Watford

- Football League Fourth Division: 1977–78

Brentford

- Football League Fourth Division fourth-place promotion: 1977–78

Individual

- Millwall Hall of Fame
