= Billy Sweetzer =

Canadian soccer player

Personal information
- Full name: William Sweetzer
- Date of birth: 15 February 1958 (age 68)
- Place of birth: Toronto, Ontario, Canada
- Positions: Defender; midfielder

Youth career
- 1973–1975: Oxford United
- 1975–1977: Queens Park Rangers

Senior career*
Years	Team	Apps	(Gls)
1977–1980	Brentford	0	(0)
1980–1981	Bracknell Town		
1981	Tampa Bay Rowdies	5	(0)
Total		5	(0)
- * Club domestic league appearances and goals

William Sweetzer (born 15 February 1958) is a Canadian former professional soccer player. He began his career in England as a youth player with both Oxford United and Queens Park Rangers, before he became a professional with Brentford – although he never made a league appearance. He later played non-league football with Bracknell Town, before playing in the NASL for the Tampa Bay Rowdies in 1981. His brothers Gordon and Jimmy also played professional soccer.
