= Willie Graham (footballer, born 1959) =

Association footballer from Northern Ireland

Personal information
- Full name: William Valentine Graham
- Date of birth: 14 February 1959 (age 67)
- Place of birth: Armagh, Northern Ireland
- Position: Midfielder

Youth career
- Northampton Town
- Stewarts & Lloyds Corby

Senior career*
Years	Team	Apps	(Gls)
1977–1981	Brentford	48	(3)
1981	Hillingdon Borough		
- Bracknell Town
- Camberley Town
- Sandhurst Town
- * Club domestic league appearances and goals

William Valentine Graham (born 14 February 1959) is a Northern Irish retired professional footballer who played as a midfielder in the Football League for Brentford.

== Career ==
=== Brentford ===
After spells at Northampton Town and Stewarts & Lloyds Corby, Graham signed on trial for Fourth Division club Brentford in August 1977. He quickly established himself in the first team, signing a professional contract and making 32 appearances and scoring two goals during the 1977–78 season, helping the Bees to a fourth-place finish and promotion to the Third Division. Despite signing a new long-term contract, Graham's appearances tailed off in the Third Division and he departed the club in February 1981, having made 51 appearances and scored three goals for the Bees.

=== Non-League football ===
Graham dropped into non-League football after leaving Brentford, joining Southern League South Division club Hillingdon Borough during the 1980–81 season. He later had spells at Bracknell Town, Camberley Town and Sandhurst Town.

== Career statistics ==
Appearances and goals by club, season and competition
Club	Season	League			FA Cup		League Cup		Total	
Club	Season	Division	Apps	Goals	Apps	Goals	Apps	Goals	Apps	Goals
Brentford	1977–78	Fourth Division	31	2	1	0	0	0	32	2
Brentford	1978–79	Third Division	11	0	0	0	2	0	13	0
Brentford	1979–80	Third Division	1	0	0	0	0	0	1	0
Brentford	1980–81	Third Division	5	1	0	0	0	0	5	1
Career total			48	3	1	0	2	0	51	3

== Honours ==
Brentford

- Football League Fourth Division fourth-place promotion: 1977–78
