= Trevor Porter =

English footballer and coach

Personal information
- Full name: Trevor James Porter
- Date of birth: 16 October 1956 (age 70)
- Place of birth: Guildford, England
- Position: Goalkeeper

Senior career*
Years	Team	Apps	(Gls)
	Fulham	0	(0)
1976–1978	Slough Town	82	(0)
1978–1980	Brentford	15	(0)
- * Club domestic league appearances and goals

Trevor James Porter (born 16 October 1956) is an English retired professional footballer who played as a goalkeeper in the Football League for Brentford.

== Playing career ==
=== Fulham ===
A goalkeeper, Porter began his career at Second Division club Fulham and signed his first professional contract in May 1974, but left the club in 1976 without making a first team appearance.

=== Slough Town ===
Porter dropped into non-League football to sign for Isthmian League First Division club Slough Town prior to the beginning of the 1976–77 season. He was first-choice goalkeeper at the club and made 113 appearances before departing at the end of the 1978–79 season.

=== Brentford ===
A hand injury to Len Bond and a suspension for Graham Cox saw Porter return to the Football League to sign for Third Division club Brentford in August 1978 for a £750 fee. Porter played in the first 13 matches of the season, until the fit-again Len Bond came back into the team. He was kept on for the 1979–80 season and made four further appearances before being released.

== Coaching career ==
Porter coached at Conference Premier clubs Crawley Town and Weymouth in the 2005–06 and 2008–09 seasons respectively. He served as goalkeeping coach at Conference Premier club Woking in the early 2010s, before resigning in January 2011.

== Personal life ==
Since dropping out of professional football in 1976, Porter has run his own window cleaning business in his hometown of Guildford.

== Career statistics ==
Appearances and goals by club, season and competition
Club	Season	League			FA Cup		League Cup		Other		Total	
Club	Season	Division	Apps	Goals	Apps	Goals	Apps	Goals	Apps	Goals	Apps	Goals
Slough Town	1976–77	Isthmian League First Division	42	0	7	0	—		15 (Note: 9 appearances in FA Trophy, 4 appearances in Berks & Bucks Senior Cup, 2 appearances in Isthmian League Cup)	0	64	0
Slough Town	1977–78	Isthmian League Premier Division	40	0	2	0	—		7 (Note: 4 appearances in FA Trophy, 2 appearances in Berks & Bucks Senior Cup, 1 appearance in Isthmian League Cup)	0	49	0
Slough Town	Total		82	0	9	0	—		22	0	113	0
Brentford	1978–79	Third Division	11	0	0	0	2	0	—		13	0
Brentford	1979–80	Third Division	4	0	0	0	0	0	—		4	0
Brentford	Total		15	0	0	0	2	0	—		17	0
Career total			97	0	9	0	2	0	22	0	130	0
