= Terry Glynn =

English footballer

Personal information
- Full name: Terence Robert Glynn
- Date of birth: 17 December 1958 (age 67)
- Place of birth: Hackney, England
- Position: Forward

Senior career*
| Years | Team | Apps | (Gls) |
| 1976–1977 | Orient | 2 | (0) |
| 1977 | Brentford | 0 | (0) |
| 1977–1978 | Ilford | | (18) |
| 1980 | Hendon | 4 | (1) |
| 1980–1984 | Wycombe Wanderers | 136 | (62) |
| 1984–1985 | Dartford | 14 | (4) |
| 1985 | Slough Town | 10 | (4) |
| 1985–1986 | Chelmsford City | 23 | (2) |
| 1986 | Slough Town | 7 | (1) |
| 1986 | Dagenham | | |
- Enfield
- * Club domestic league appearances and goals

Terence Robert Glynn (born 17 December 1958) is an English former professional footballer who played in the Football League as a forward for Orient. He notably scored 90 goals in 186 appearances for Wycombe Wanderers.

== Career statistics ==
Appearances and goals by club, season and competition
| Club | Season | League | | | FA Cup | | League Cup | | Other | | Total | |
| Club | Season | Division | Apps | Goals | Apps | Goals | Apps | Goals | Apps | Goals | Apps | Goals |
|---|---|---|---|---|---|---|---|---|---|---|---|---|
| Brentford | 1977–78 | Fourth Division | 0 | 0 | — | | 1 | 0 | — | | 1 | 0 |
| Hendon | 1979-80 | Isthmian League Premier Division | 4 | 1 | — | | — | | — | | 4 | 1 |
| Slough Town | 1984–85 | Isthmian League Premier Division | 10 | 4 | — | | — | | 2 (Note: Appearances in FA Trophy) | 1 | 12 | 5 |
| Slough Town | 1985–86 | Isthmian League Premier Division | 7 | 1 | — | | — | | — | | 7 | 1 |
| Slough Town | Total | | 17 | 5 | — | | — | | — | | 19 | 6 |
| Career total | | | 21 | 6 | — | | 1 | 0 | 2 | 1 | 24 | 7 |
