= Jimmy Sweetzer =

English footballer

Personal information
- Date of birth: 8 January 1960 (age 66)
- Place of birth: Woking, England
- Position: Striker

Youth career
- Oxford United

Senior career*
Years	Team	Apps	(Gls)
1978–1979	Oxford United	8	(1)
1979–1980	Millwall	3	(1)
- Wealdstone
Total		11	(2)
- * Club domestic league appearances and goals

Jimmy Sweetzer (born 8 January 1960) is an English former professional footballer who played as a striker.

== Career ==
Born in Woking, Sweetzer played for Oxford United, Millwall and Wealdstone.

== Personal life ==
His brothers Billy and Gordon were also professional footballers.
