= Steve Harding =

English footballer

Personal information
- Full name: Stephen John Harding
- Date of birth: 23 July 1956 (age 70)
- Place of birth: Bristol, England
- Height: 6 ft 2 in (1.88 m)
- Position: Central defender

Youth career
- –1974: Bristol City

Senior career*
| Years | Team | Apps | (Gls) |
| 1974–1977 | Bristol City | 2 | (0) |
| 1976 | → Southend United (loan) | 2 | (0) |
| 1976 | → Grimsby Town (loan) | 8 | (0) |
| 1977–1980 | Bristol Rovers | 38 | (1) |
| 1980 | → Brentford (loan) | 4 | (0) |
| 1980–1981 | Bath City | 2 | (0) |
| 1981–1982 | Trowbridge Town | 49 | (2) |
| 1982–1984 | Gloucester City | 56 | (7) |
| 1984– | Paulton Rovers | | |
| –1985 | Mangotsfield United | | |
| 1985–1987 | Trowbridge Town | | |

International career
- England Youth
- * Club domestic league appearances and goals

Stephen John Harding (born 23 July 1956) is an English retired professional footballer who played as a central defender in the Football League for hometown clubs Bristol Rovers and Bristol City. He also played League football for Grimsby Town, Brentford and Southend United. He went on to play non-League football for Bath City, Trowbridge Town, Gloucester City and Mangotsfield United.

== Career statistics ==
Appearances and goals by club, season and competition
| Club | Season | League | | | FA Cup | | League Cup | | Other | | Total | |
| Club | Season | Division | Apps | Goals | Apps | Goals | Apps | Goals | Apps | Goals | Apps | Goals |
|---|---|---|---|---|---|---|---|---|---|---|---|---|
| Southend United (loan) | 1975–76 | Third Division | 2 | 0 | — | | — | | — | | 2 | 0 |
| Bristol Rovers | 1977–78 | Second Division | 7 | 1 | 0 | 0 | 0 | 0 | 2 (Note: Appearances in Anglo-Scottish Cup) | 0 | 9 | 1 |
| Bristol Rovers | 1978–79 | Second Division | 11 | 0 | 3 | 0 | 0 | 0 | 2 | 0 | 16 | 0 |
| Bristol Rovers | 1979–80 | Second Division | 20 | 0 | 0 | 0 | 2 | 0 | — | | 22 | 0 |
| Bristol Rovers | Total | | 38 | 1 | 3 | 0 | 2 | 0 | 4 | 0 | 43 | 1 |
| Brentford (loan) | 1979–80 | Third Division | 4 | 0 | — | | — | | — | | 4 | 0 |
| Gloucester City | 1982–83 | Southern League Premier Division | 21 | 1 | — | | — | | 3 (Note: 1 appearance and 1 goal in FA Trophy, 1 appearance in Gloucestershire Senior Cup, 1 appearance in Western Counties Floodlight League) | 1 | 24 | 2 |
| Gloucester City | 1983–84 | Southern League Premier Division | 29 | 6 | 2 | 0 | — | | 17 (Note: 5 appearances in FA Trophy, 5 appearances in Southern League Cup, 4 appearances in Worcestershire Senior Cup, 1 appearance in Gloucestershire Senior Cup) | 0 | 48 | 6 |
| Gloucester City | 1984–85 | Southern League Premier Division | 6 | 0 | 1 | 0 | — | | 5 (Note: 4 appearances in Southern League Cup, 1 appearance in Worcestershire Senior Cup) | 0 | 12 | 0 |
| Gloucester City | Total | | 56 | 7 | 3 | 0 | — | | 25 | 1 | 84 | 8 |
| Career total | | | 100 | 8 | 6 | 0 | 2 | 0 | 29 | 1 | 137 | 9 |

== Honours ==
Gloucester City

- Gloucestershire Senior Cup: 1982–83
