= Billy Holmes (footballer, born 1951) =

English footballer (1951–1988)

Personal information
- Full name: William Gerald Holmes
- Date of birth: 4 February 1951
- Place of birth: Balham, England
- Date of death: March 1988 (aged 37)
- Place of death: Daventry, England
- Position: Forward

Senior career*
Years	Team	Apps	(Gls)
1969–1970	Woking		
1970–1973	Millwall	1	(0)
1973–1974	Luton Town	1	(0)
1974–1975	Barnet	42	(14)
1975–1977	Wimbledon	92	(28)
1977–1979	Hereford United	31	(5)
1979–1980	Brentford	15	(2)
1979–1982	Aylesbury United		
1982	Barnet	9	(1)
- * Club domestic league appearances and goals

William Gerald Holmes (4 February 1951 – March 1988) was an English professional footballer who played in the Football League as a forward, most notably for Barnet and Hereford United.

== Personal life ==
After dropping out of professional football, Holmes worked as a warehouseman and in March 1988, he committed suicide at age 37.

== Career statistics ==
Appearances and goals by club, season and competition
Club	Season	League			FA Cup		League Cup		Other		Total	
Club	Season	Division	Apps	Goals	Apps	Goals	Apps	Goals	Apps	Goals	Apps	Goals
Millwall	1970–71	Second Division	1	0	0	0	0	0	—		1	0
Luton Town	1973–74	Second Division	1	0	0	0	0	0	—		1	0
Barnet	1974–75	Southern League Premier Division	42	14	2	0	—		1 (Note: Appearance in FA Trophy)	0	45	14
Hereford United	1977–78	Third Division	15	2	2	0	—		—		17	2
Hereford United	1978–79	Fourth Division	16	3	0	0	3	1	—		19	4
Hereford United	Total		31	5	2	0	3	1	—		36	6
Aylesbury United	1979–80	Southern League Southern Division	0	0	1	0	—		—		1	0
Brentford	1979–80	Third Division	15	2	0	0	0	0	—		15	2
Aylesbury United	1980–81	Southern League Southern Division	42	16	7	3	—		13 (Note: 10 appearances and 2 goals in FA Trophy, 3 appearances in Berks & Bucks Senior Cup)	2	62	21
Aylesbury United	Total		42	16	8	3	—		13	2	63	21
Barnet	1981–82	Alliance Premier League	9	1	—		—		—		9	1
Barnet	Total		51	15	2	0	—		1	0	54	15
Career total			140	38	12	3	3	1	14	2	170	44

== Honours ==
Wimbledon

- Southern League Premier Division (2): 1975–76, 1976–77
