= Peter Darke =

English footballer

Personal information
- Full name: Peter George Darke
- Date of birth: 21 December 1953 (age 72)
- Place of birth: Exeter, England
- Date of death: 1 October 2021 (aged 67)
- Place of death: Torquay, England
- Height: 5 ft 10 1/2 in (1.79 m)
- Position: Full back

Senior career*
Years	Team	Apps	(Gls)
1971–1977	Plymouth Argyle	100	(2)
1976–1977	→ Exeter City (loan)	5	(0)
1977–1979	Torquay United	59	(0)
- Minehead
- Saltash United
- Liskeard Athletic
Total		164	(2)
- * Club domestic league appearances and goals

Peter Darke (21 December 1953 – 1 October 2021) was an English footballer who played as a full back.

He began his career as an apprentice with Plymouth Argyle, having been spotted playing for Exeter Schoolboys. He made his debut in August 1971 at the age of 17, and went on to make 107 appearances in all competitions during his six years at Home Park, scoring two goals. He spent time on loan with Exeter City during the 1976–77 season before joining Torquay United in 1977. He retired from the professional game two years later, and went on to play non-league football for Minehead, Saltash United and Liskeard Athletic. He later worked as a salesman in Exeter.

He died in Torquay on 1 October 2021.
