= Stewart Henderson (footballer, born 1947) =

Scottish footballer

Personal information
- Date of birth: 5 June 1947 (age 79)
- Place of birth: Bridge of Allan, Scotland
- Height: 5 ft 8 in (1.73 m)
- Position: Full back

Senior career*
Years	Team	Apps	(Gls)
1964–1965	Chelsea	0	(0)
1965–1973	Brighton & Hove Albion	198	(1)
1973–1983	Reading	166	(6)
Total		364	(7)
- * Club domestic league appearances and goals

Stewart Henderson (born 5 June 1947) is a Scottish former footballer who played in the Football League for Brighton & Hove Albion and Reading as a full back.
