= David Collier (footballer) =

Welsh footballer (1957–2021)

Personal information
- Full name: David Collier
- Date of birth: 2 October 1957
- Place of birth: Colwyn Bay, Wales
- Date of death: 2021 (aged 63–64)
- Position: Right back

Senior career*
Years	Team	Apps	(Gls)
1975–1977	Shrewsbury Town	20	(4)
1977–1978	Crewe Alexandra	26	(1)
- * Club domestic league appearances and goals

David Collier (2 October 1957 – 2021) was a Welsh professional footballer who played in the Football League for Crewe Alexandra and Shrewsbury Town as a right back.
