= 1981–82 FA Trophy =

1980-81 FA Trophy
FA Challenge Trophy

Tournament details
- Country: England; Wales
- Teams: 221

Final positions
- Champions: Enfield
- Runners-up: Altrincham

The 1981–82 FA Trophy was the thirteenth season of the FA Trophy.

== Preliminary round ==
=== Ties ===
Tie	Home team	Score	Away team
1	Alfreton Town	4-2	Darlaston
2	Belper Town	3-0	Lye Town
3	Bilston	3-1	Arnold
4	Bridport	1-3	Bideford
5	Chatham Town	1-2	Wembley
6	Cinderford Town	3-4	Maesteg Park
7	Clandown	0-2	Llanelli
8	Clevedon Town	2-0	Glastonbury
9	Colwyn Bay	1-0	Kirkby Town
10	Dawlish Town	4-5	Shepton Mallet Town
11	Dudley Town	3-0	Eastwood Town
12	Emley	4-1	Bridlington Trinity
13	Feltham	0-2	Kingstonian
14	Hampton	0-1	Lewes
15	Heanor Town	1-0	Ilkeston Town
16	Hertford Town	2-0	Hornchurch
17	Keynsham Town	1-2	Welton Rovers
18	Knighton Town	0-1	Haverfordwest County
19	Long Eaton United	1-1	Highgate United
20	Maidenhead United	2-4	Oxford City
21	Metropolitan Police	7-0	Camberley Town
22	Rhyl	1-1	Caernarfon Town
23	Sittingbourne	0-2	Chesham United
24	St Albans City	4-1	Lowestoft Town
25	Sudbury Town	2-1	Aveley
26	Sutton Coldfield Town	2-2	Mexborough Town Athletic
27	Sutton Town	2-0	New Mills
28	Walton & Hersham	0-1	Farnborough Town
29	Ware	1-3	Finchley

=== Replays ===
Tie	Home team	Score	Away team
19	Highgate United	0-1	Long Eaton United
22	Caernarfon Town	4-1	Rhyl
26	Mexborough Town Athletic	1-1	Sutton Coldfield Town

=== 2nd replay ===
Tie	Home team	Score	Away team
26	Sutton Coldfield Town	3-2	Mexborough Town Athletic

== First qualifying round ==
=== Ties ===
Tie	Home team	Score	Away team
1	Addlestone & Weybridge Town	2-1	Crawley Town
2	Alfreton Town	1-1	Curzon Ashton
3	Banbury United	2-3	King's Lynn
4	Barnstaple Town	3-2	Haverfordwest County
5	Belper Town	0-2	Buxton
6	Billericay Town	4-0	Sudbury Town
7	Bilston	1-0	Bootle
8	Bromley	3-0	Folkestone
9	Chelmsford City	1-0	Cambridge City
10	Chesham United	3-2	Dunstable
11	Clapton	0-3	St Albans City
12	Colwyn Bay	9-2	Brereton Social
13	Croydon	2-0	Ashford Town (Kent)
14	Darwen	5-0	Crook Town
15	Emley	0-0	Whitby Town
16	Enderby Town	3-1	A P Leamington
17	Epsom & Ewell	6-0	Thanet United
18	Evenwood Town	0-0	Ferryhill Athletic
19	Fareham Town	2-1	Sheppey United
20	Finchley	1-2	Boreham Wood
21	Formby	0-3	Hyde United
22	Gateshead	1-0	Durham City
23	Gloucester City	2-1	Salisbury
24	Goole Town	3-1	Consett
25	Gosport Borough	1-1	Farnborough Town
26	Grantham	0-2	Bromsgrove Rovers
27	Harlow Town	1-0	Wembley
28	Harrow Borough	2-2	Wealdstone
29	Heanor Town	1-0	Macclesfield Town
30	Hednesford Town	1-2	Bedworth United
31	Hertford Town	2-0	Corby Town
32	Hillingdon Borough	2-1	Oxford City
33	Horden Colliery Welfare	2-1	Fleetwood Town
34	Horwich R M I	3-0	Ashton United
35	Kingstonian	4-1	Hounslow
36	Lewes	2-2	Canterbury City
37	Long Eaton United	0-1	Leek Town
38	Maesteg Park	2-1	Clevedon Town
39	Mangotsfield United	0-1	Taunton Town
40	Metropolitan Police	0-3	Basingstoke Town
41	Milton Keynes City	0-1	Spalding United
42	Nantwich Town	2-1	Southport
43	Netherfield	1-0	Willington
44	Oswestry Town	0-2	Prescot Cables
45	Penrith	3-1	Tow Law Town
46	Poole Town	5-1	Llanelli
47	Redditch United	1-3	Dudley Town
48	Saltash United	1-0	Weston-super-Mare
49	Shildon	4-2	St Helens Town
50	South Bank	1-2	Burscough
51	South Liverpool	1-4	Caernarfon Town
52	Stourbridge	1-2	Sutton Coldfield Town
53	Sutton Town	1-2	Boston
54	Tamworth	1-1	Worksop Town
55	Telford United	1-1	Moor Green
56	Tonbridge	2-1	Andover
57	Trowbridge Town	2-1	Shepton Mallet Town
58	Waterlooville	2-2	Staines Town
59	Wellingborough Town	2-1	Witney Town
60	Welton Rovers	0-1	Bideford
61	West Auckland Town	1-3	Rossendale United
62	Whitley Bay	0-0	North Shields
63	Wokingham Town	3-1	Hayes
64	Workington	3-1	Droylsden

=== Replays ===
Tie	Home team	Score	Away team
2	Curzon Ashton	1-2	Alfreton Town
15	Whitby Town	2-1	Emley
18	Ferryhill Athletic	8-0	Evenwood Town
25	Farnborough Town	3-3	Gosport Borough
28	Wealdstone	4-0	Harrow Borough
36	Canterbury City	2-5	Lewes
54	Worksop Town	3-1	Tamworth
55	Moor Green	0-2	Telford United
58	Staines Town	1-0	Waterlooville
62	North Shields	2-0	Whitley Bay

=== 2nd replay ===
Tie	Home team	Score	Away team
25	Gosport Borough	2-2	Farnborough Town

=== 3rd replay ===
Tie	Home team	Score	Away team
25	Farnborough Town	1-2	Gosport Borough

== Second qualifying round ==
=== Ties ===
Tie	Home team	Score	Away team
1	Addlestone & Weybridge Town	2-0	Lewes
2	Basingstoke Town	2-2	Gosport Borough
3	Bedworth United	1-1	Wealdstone
4	Bideford	0-0	Poole Town
5	Billericay Town	5-0	Hillingdon Borough
6	Bilston	1-2	Telford United
7	Boreham Wood	0-1	Sutton Coldfield Town
8	Bromsgrove Rovers	0-0	Hyde United
9	Burscough	3-1	Whitby Town
10	Buxton	4-0	Heanor Town
11	Caernarfon Town	0-1	Nantwich Town
12	Chesham United	1-1	Spalding United
13	Colwyn Bay	5-1	Alfreton Town
14	Darwen	2-2	Horwich R M I
15	Dudley Town	0-1	Prescot Cables
16	Epsom & Ewell	3-1	Tonbridge
17	Fareham Town	1-2	Staines Town
18	Ferryhill Athletic	1-1	Rossendale United
19	Gloucester City	4-0	Maesteg Park
20	Harlow Town	1-1	Wellingborough Town
21	Hertford Town	1-2	Enderby Town
22	Horden Colliery Welfare	5-0	North Shields
23	King's Lynn	2-2	Boston
24	Kingstonian	2-2	Croydon
25	Penrith	2-1	Netherfield
26	Saltash United	1-1	Taunton Town
27	Shildon	0-0	Goole Town
28	St Albans City	2-1	Chelmsford City
29	Trowbridge Town	4-0	Barnstaple Town
30	Wokingham Town	4-1	Bromley
31	Workington	1-0	Gateshead
32	Worksop Town	1-1	Leek Town

=== Replays ===
Tie	Home team	Score	Away team
2	Gosport Borough	2-1	Basingstoke Town
3	Wealdstone	5-1	Bedworth United
4	Poole Town	1-3	Bideford
8	Hyde United	1-0	Bromsgrove Rovers
12	Spalding United	0-1	Chesham United
14	Horwich R M I	3-2	Darwen
18	Rossendale United	3-0	Ferryhill Athletic
20	Wellingborough Town	1-2	Harlow Town
23	Boston	0-2	King's Lynn
24	Croydon	1-0	Kingstonian
26	Taunton Town	2-0	Saltash United
27	Goole Town	4-3	Shildon
32	Leek Town	4-1	Worksop Town

== Third qualifying round ==
=== Ties ===
Tie	Home team	Score	Away team
1	Alvechurch	3-0	Billericay Town
2	Barking	1-0	Chesham United
3	Bath City	3-0	Bridgwater Town
4	Bideford	0-3	Merthyr Tydfil
5	Bridgend Town	0-3	Gloucester City
6	Burscough	1-3	Horden Colliery Welfare
7	Burton Albion	1-0	Winsford United
8	Carshalton Athletic	0-0	Dorchester Town
9	Colwyn Bay	1-1	Hyde United
10	Croydon	3-2	Gosport Borough
11	Enderby Town	4-4	St Albans City
12	Epsom & Ewell	1-1	Gravesend & Northfleet
13	Frome Town	1-1	Taunton Town
14	Goole Town	0-1	Lancaster City
15	Hendon	2-1	Barnet
16	Hitchin Town	3-0	Leytonstone Ilford
17	Horwich R M I	0-1	Chorley
18	Kidderminster Harriers	1-0	Leek Town
19	King's Lynn	2-2	Harlow Town
20	Leatherhead	2-2	Addlestone & Weybridge Town
21	Maidstone United	2-1	Bognor Regis Town
22	Minehead	3-1	Trowbridge Town
23	Morecambe	0-2	Bishop Auckland
24	Prescot Cables	0-1	Buxton
25	Rossendale United	3-1	Penrith
26	Staines Town	2-2	Wokingham Town
27	Stalybridge Celtic	5-1	Gainsborough Trinity
28	Sutton Coldfield Town	0-0	Wealdstone
29	Telford United	5-0	Nantwich Town
30	Tooting & Mitcham United	2-0	Dover
31	Witton Albion	2-0	Matlock Town
32	Workington	0-1	Frickley Athletic

=== Replays ===
Tie	Home team	Score	Away team
8	Dorchester Town	2-0	Carshalton Athletic
9	Hyde United	4-0	Colwyn Bay
11	St Albans City	3-1	Enderby Town
12	Gravesend & Northfleet	3-3	Epsom & Ewell
13	Taunton Town	4-2	Frome Town
19	Harlow Town	2-1	King's Lynn
20	Addlestone & Weybridge Town	0-1	Leatherhead
26	Wokingham Town	0-2	Staines Town
28	Wealdstone	2-1	Sutton Coldfield Town

=== 2nd replay ===
Tie	Home team	Score	Away team
12	Gravesend & Northfleet	0-1	Epsom & Ewell

== 1st round ==
The teams that given byes to this round are Bishop's Stortford, Altrincham, Kettering Town, Scarborough, Northwich Victoria, Weymouth, Boston United, Barrow, Stafford Rangers, Worcester City, Yeovil Town, Dartford, Runcorn, Enfield, Dagenham, Nuneaton Borough, Bangor City, Bedford Town, Wycombe Wanderers, Spennymoor United, Marine, Blyth Spartans, Cheltenham Town, Mossley, Walthamstow Avenue, Dulwich Hamlet, Sutton United, Woking, Ashington, Hastings United, Aylesbury United and Slough Town.

=== Ties ===
Tie	Home team	Score	Away team
1	Altrincham	1-0	Nuneaton Borough
2	Alvechurch	1-3	Croydon
3	Ashington	1-2	Blyth Spartans
4	Aylesbury United	2-4	Sutton United
5	Bedford Town	1-1	Staines Town
6	Boston United	0-1	Hyde United
7	Buxton	1-2	Rossendale United
8	Cheltenham Town	2-3	Epsom & Ewell
9	Dagenham	1-0	Hitchin Town
10	Dartford	2-1	Leatherhead
11	Dulwich Hamlet	1-1	St Albans City
12	Frickley Athletic	0-1	Bishop Auckland
13	Hendon	5-1	Taunton Town
14	Horden Colliery Welfare	1-1	Witton Albion
15	Kettering Town	0-1	Mossley
16	Kidderminster Harriers	0-0	Barrow
17	Lancaster City	2-0	Spennymoor United
18	Maidstone United	1-1	Hastings United
19	Marine	0-1	Scarborough
20	Merthyr Tydfil	2-1	Dorchester Town
21	Minehead	1-1	Worcester City
22	Northwich Victoria	3-2	Bangor City
23	Runcorn	2-0	Stafford Rangers
24	Slough Town	4-2	Bath City
25	Stalybridge Celtic	0-1	Chorley
26	Telford United	1-0	Burton Albion
27	Tooting & Mitcham United	0-0	Harlow Town
28	Walthamstow Avenue	1-1	Wycombe Wanderers
29	Wealdstone	3-1	Gloucester City
30	Weymouth	0-1	Enfield
31	Woking	2-1	Barking
32	Yeovil Town	2-3	Bishop's Stortford

=== Replays ===
Tie	Home team	Score	Away team
5	Staines Town	2-3	Bedford Town
11	St Albans City	4-3	Dulwich Hamlet
14	Witton Albion	2-2	Horden Colliery Welfare
16	Barrow	2-2	Kidderminster Harriers
18	Hastings United	0-2	Maidstone United
21	Worcester City	5-2	Minehead
27	Harlow Town	2-1	Tooting & Mitcham United
28	Wycombe Wanderers	1-1	Walthamstow Avenue

=== 2nd replay ===
Tie	Home team	Score	Away team
14	Witton Albion	2-1	Horden Colliery Welfare
16	Kidderminster Harriers	2-1	Barrow
28	Wycombe Wanderers	5-1	Walthamstow Avenue

== 2nd round ==
=== Ties ===
Tie	Home team	Score	Away team
1	Bishop's Stortford	3-0	Maidstone United
2	Chorley	0-1	Bishop Auckland
3	Dartford	0-2	Northwich Victoria
4	Epsom & Ewell	0-1	Altrincham
5	Harlow Town	0-1	Sutton United
6	Hyde United	0-0	Wycombe Wanderers
7	Kidderminster Harriers	2-1	Blyth Spartans
8	Merthyr Tydfil	1-6	Enfield
9	Runcorn	4-0	Lancaster City
10	Slough Town	1-0	Rossendale United
11	St Albans City	0-1	Scarborough
12	Telford United	0-0	Bedford Town
13	Wealdstone	1-2	Dagenham
14	Witton Albion	1-0	Hendon
15	Woking	0-0	Mossley
16	Worcester City	4-1	Croydon

=== Replays ===
Tie	Home team	Score	Away team
6	Wycombe Wanderers	3-2	Hyde United
12	Bedford Town	0-3	Telford United
15	Mossley	5-0	Woking

== 3rd round ==
=== Ties ===
Tie	Home team	Score	Away team
1	Altrincham	2-0	Mossley
2	Bishop's Stortford	6-1	Witton Albion
3	Kidderminster Harriers	4-3	Dagenham
4	Northwich Victoria	3-0	Runcorn
5	Scarborough	1-1	Slough Town
6	Sutton United	1-1	Worcester City
7	Telford United	0-1	Enfield
8	Wycombe Wanderers	4-1	Bishop Auckland

=== Replays ===
Tie	Home team	Score	Away team
5	Slough Town	1-2	Scarborough
6	Worcester City	5-2	Sutton United

== 4th round ==
=== Ties ===
Tie	Home team	Score	Away team
1	Altrincham	2-2	Bishop's Stortford
2	Enfield	4-2	Scarborough
3	Kidderminster Harriers	0-1	Wycombe Wanderers
4	Northwich Victoria	2-1	Worcester City

=== Replay ===
Tie	Home team	Score	Away team
1	Bishop's Stortford	1-3	Altrincham

== Semi finals ==
=== First leg ===
Tie	Home team	Score	Away team
1	Altrincham	1-1	Wycombe Wanderers
2	Northwich Victoria	0-0	Enfield

=== Second leg ===
Tie	Home team	Score	Away team	Aggregate
1	Wycombe Wanderers	0-3	Altrincham	1-4
2	Enfield	1-0	Northwich Victoria	1-0

== Final ==
Home team	Score	Away team
Enfield	1-0	Altrincham
