= Andrew McCulloch (footballer) =

English footballer (born 1950)

Andy McCulloch
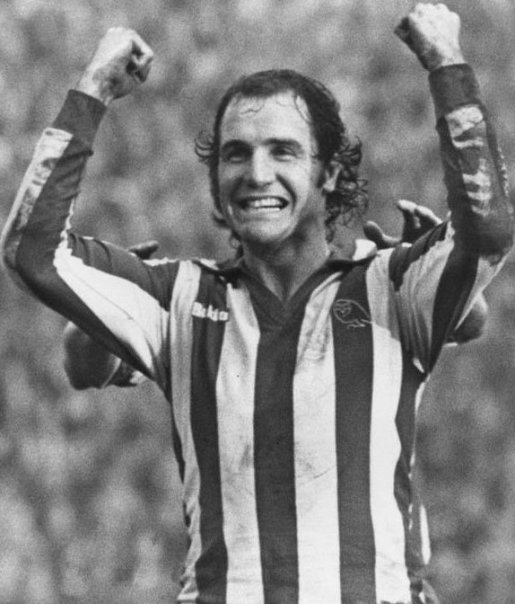

Personal information
- Full name: Andrew McCulloch
- Date of birth: 3 January 1950 (age 76)
- Place of birth: Northampton, England
- Height: 6 ft 2 in (1.88 m)
- Position: Centre forward

Youth career
- Fleet Town
- 19??–1970: Walton & Hersham

Senior career*
Years	Team	Apps	(Gls)
1970–1972	Queens Park Rangers	41	(10)
1972–1974	Cardiff City	58	(24)
1974–1976	Oxford United	41	(9)
1976–1979	Brentford	127	(48)
1978	→ Oakland Stompers (loan)	18	(3)
1979–1983	Sheffield Wednesday	125	(44)
1983–1984	Crystal Palace	25	(3)
1984–1985	Aldershot	16	(2)
Total		433	(140)

International career
1973	Scotland U23	1	(0)

Managerial career
- 19??–2008: Esher United
- * Club domestic league appearances and goals

Andrew McCulloch (born 3 January 1950) is an English former professional footballer who played for Queens Park Rangers, Cardiff City, Oxford United, Brentford, Sheffield Wednesday, Crystal Palace and Aldershot. He played a total of 475 games in all competitions for his seven league clubs, scoring 153 goals in a career which lasted from 1970 until 1985. McCulloch was a centre forward in the "target man" mould, being 6 ft 2in (1.88 m) tall, he was good in the air, using his strong physique to hold off defenders and lay the ball off to teammates. He made one appearance for the Scotland national under 23 team.

McCulloch was born in Northampton on 3 January 1950. He was the son of Adam McCulloch who played over 200 league games for Northampton Town, Shrewsbury Town and Aldershot. Andy was brought up in Hampshire, the family moving there when his father signed for Aldershot in 1953. On leaving school he attended university and obtained a Civil engineering degree before playing full-time football.

== Playing career ==
Andy McCulloch first made a name for himself as a teenager playing for Fleet Town in the Hampshire League and was subsequently invited for a trial at Tottenham Hotspur. However nothing came of the Tottenham connection and he signed for non-League Walton & Hersham being part of the team which won the Athenian League title in the 1968–69 season. McCulloch was spotted by Queens Park Rangers manager Les Allen and he signed for Rangers in October 1970.

=== Queens Park Rangers ===
The 20-year-old McCulloch made his Rangers debut immediately, replacing Frank Saul in the team, playing in a 5–2 home win over Birmingham City on 17 October 1970 and scoring the fifth goal. He did not actually get paid for that debut match as he was still registered as an amateur, his professional registration coming through a few days later. McCulloch was never a regular member of the Rangers team over the next two years, making 30 starts in League matches. His days at Rangers were numbered when they bolstered their forward line by signing Stan Bowles and Don Givens for the start of the 1972–73 season and he was sold to Cardiff City for a fee of £45,000 in October 1972.

=== Cardiff City and Oxford United ===
In his two years with Cardiff City, the team had a fairly mediocre time finishing near the bottom of Division Two in both seasons. McCulloch however, had good form, top scoring in both seasons, notching 30 goals in 68 matches in all competitions. It was at this time that he was called up for his only cap for the Scotland under-23 team, his Scottish parentage making him eligible even though he was born in England. Cardiff won the Welsh Cup in both seasons that McCulloch played there, qualifying them for the UEFA Cup Winners' Cup and in September 1973 McCulloch played against Sporting Clube de Portugal in the two-legged first round tie of the cup which Cardiff lost 2–1 on aggregate to give him the only experience of European football in his career. In July 1974, he moved to another Second Division side, Oxford United in a £70,000 deal, he had a fairly disappointing time at Oxford with the team relegated in his second season (1975–76) and McCulloch making only 12 league appearances. A botched recovery process from a cartilage operation saw McCulloch nearly lose a leg.

=== Brentford ===
With his career stalling McCulloch was forced to drop down to Division Four in his next move when he joined Brentford in March 1976 for a then club record fee of £25,000. His move to The Bees rejuvenated his career although it was not until his second full season (1977–78) that things really started to happen when Brentford achieved promotion with McCulloch scoring 22 goals in 45 league appearances and forming a fine striking partnership with Steve Phillips, who contributed an excellent 32 goals. In the summer of 1978 McCulloch was loaned out to Oakland Stompers of the North American Soccer League where he made 18 appearances, scoring three goals with one assist. Back at Brentford for the 1978–79 campaign, the team consolidated their position in Division Three with McCulloch contributing 13 goals.

=== Sheffield Wednesday ===
McCulloch's time as a Brentford player came to an end in May 1979 when he was persuaded to join Third Division Sheffield Wednesday. Wednesday manager Jack Charlton was looking for a target man to partner Terry Curran in The Owls forward line and saw McCulloch as the ideal man. Charlton was working as a pundit for ITV on the 1979 FA Cup Final and met McCulloch on the Wembley gantry and agreed a deal which went through officially the following month. Jack Charlton, who had a tendency to get mixed up over his player's names often referred to McCulloch as "Ian", confusing him with Notts County's Scottish winger Iain McCulloch. The McCulloch-Curran partnership contributed 34 goals in the following 1979–80 season as Wednesday were promoted.

1980–81 saw McCulloch as Wednesday's top scorer in their return to Division Two. In his final two years at Hillsborough he acted as a foil for Gary Bannister in the Wednesday attack, with Bannister scoring most of the goals and taking much of the glory, however McCulloch contributed seven goals in both campaigns. McCulloch played in the 1983 FA Cup semi final at Highbury when Wednesday were defeated by Brighton. In August 1983, McCulloch was sold to Crystal Palace for a fee of £20,000 as new manager Howard Wilkinson brought in Imre Varadi to partner Bannister.

=== Latter career and retirement ===
At the end of his contract at Sheffield Wednesday McCulloch returned to the south of England to play for Crystal Palace for one season. In April 1984 he returned to Hillsborough to play for Crystal Palace in a League match and received a standing ovation from the home supporters, with McCulloch saying this is one of the fondest memories of his playing days. He played the 1984–85 season with Aldershot but picked up a bad knee injury and this forced him to end his playing career at the age of 35. On retiring he worked for a company that cleaned household upholstery and hotel rooms and in 1989, opened his own cleaning business, Cardinal Cleaning in Molesey, Surrey doing the same line of work. The firm is still flourishing today having contracts to clean many big London hotels as well as individual customers. McCulloch still involved himself in football being the manager of part-time Esher United of the Kingston District League, which ended in 2017 but the team still trains together.

== Personal life ==
McCulloch is married and has a daughter. He was born to Scottish parents; his sister married footballer Ernie Howe.

== Honours ==
Brentford

- Football League Fourth Division fourth-place promotion: 1977–78

Individual

- Brentford Supporters' Player of the Year: 1977–78
- Brentford Players' Player of the Year: 1977–78
