= 1966–67 Football League First Division =

1966–67 season of Football League First Division

Football League First Division
- Season: 1966–67
- Champions: Manchester United; 7th English title
- Relegated: Aston Villa; Blackpool
- European Cup: Manchester United
- European Cup Winners' Cup: Tottenham Hotspur
- Inter-Cities Fairs Cup: Nottingham Forest; Leeds United; Liverpool
- Matches: 462
- Goals: 1,387 (3 per match)
- Top goalscorer: Ron Davies (37 goals)

Statistics of Football League First Division in the 1966–67 season.

== Overview ==
Manchester United won the First Division title for the seventh time in the club's history that season. They made sure of that on 6 May, after beating West Ham United 6–1 at Upton Park whilst their title challengers Nottingham Forest lost 2–1 at Southampton. This was their last league title for 26 years, and last in the First Division, until the inaugural 1992-93 Premier League season. Blackpool were relegated on 15 April, after losing 2–0 at Stoke City whilst Aston Villa joined them on 6 May, after losing 4–2 at home against Everton with Southampton's win against Nottingham Forest confirming their relegation.

== League standings ==
Pos	Team	Pld	W	D	L	GF	GA	GAv	Pts	Qualification or relegation
1	Manchester United (C)	42	24	12	6	84	45	1.867	60	Qualification for the European Cup first round
2	Nottingham Forest	42	23	10	9	64	41	1.561	56	Qualification for the Inter-Cities Fairs Cup first round
3	Tottenham Hotspur	42	24	8	10	71	48	1.479	56	Qualification for the European Cup Winners' Cup first round (Note: Tottenham Hotspur qualified for the European Cup Winners' Cup as the 1966–67 FA Cup winners.)
4	Leeds United	42	22	11	9	62	42	1.476	55	Qualification for the Inter-Cities Fairs Cup first round
5	Liverpool	42	19	13	10	64	47	1.362	51	Qualification for the Inter-Cities Fairs Cup first round
6	Everton	42	19	10	13	65	46	1.413	48	
7	Arsenal	42	16	14	12	58	47	1.234	46	
8	Leicester City	42	18	8	16	78	71	1.099	44	
9	Chelsea	42	15	14	13	67	62	1.081	44	
10	Sheffield United	42	16	10	16	52	59	0.881	42	
11	Sheffield Wednesday	42	14	13	15	56	47	1.191	41	
12	Stoke City	42	17	7	18	63	58	1.086	41	
13	West Bromwich Albion	42	16	7	19	77	73	1.055	39	
14	Burnley	42	15	9	18	66	76	0.868	39	
15	Manchester City	42	12	15	15	43	52	0.827	39	
16	West Ham United	42	14	8	20	80	84	0.952	36	
17	Sunderland	42	14	8	20	58	72	0.806	36	
18	Fulham	42	11	12	19	71	83	0.855	34	
19	Southampton	42	14	6	22	74	92	0.804	34	
20	Newcastle United	42	12	9	21	39	81	0.481	33	
21	Aston Villa (R)	42	11	7	24	54	85	0.635	29	Relegation to the Second Division
22	Blackpool (R)	42	6	9	27	41	76	0.539	21	Relegation to the Second Division

Source: World Football
Rules for classification: 1) Points; 2) Goal average; 3) Goals scored
(C) Champions; (R) Relegated

== Results ==
Home \ Away	ARS	AST	BLP	BUR	CHE	EVE	FUL	LEE	LEI	LIV	MCI	MUN	NEW	NOT	SHU	SHW	SOU	STK	SUN	TOT	WBA	WHU
Arsenal		1–0	1–1	0–0	2–1	3–1	1–0	0–1	2–4	1–1	1–0	1–1	2–0	1–1	2–0	1–1	4–1	3–1	2–0	0–2	2–3	2–1
Aston Villa	0–1		3–2	0–1	2–6	2–4	1–1	3–0	0–1	2–3	3–0	2–1	1–1	1–1	0–0	0–1	0–1	2–1	2–1	3–3	3–2	0–2
Blackpool	0–3	0–2		0–2	0–2	0–1	0–1	0–2	1–1	1–2	0–1	1–2	6–0	1–1	0–1	1–1	2–3	0–1	1–1	2–2	1–3	1–4
Burnley	1–4	4–2	1–0		1–2	1–1	3–0	1–1	5–2	1–0	2–3	1–1	0–2	0–2	4–0	2–0	4–1	0–2	1–0	2–2	5–1	4–2
Chelsea	3–1	3–1	0–2	1–3		1–1	0–0	2–2	2–2	1–2	0–0	1–3	2–1	2–1	1–1	0–0	4–1	1–0	1–1	3–0	0–2	5–5
Everton	0–0	3–1	0–1	1–1	3–1		3–2	2–0	2–0	3–1	1–1	1–2	1–1	0–1	4–1	2–1	0–1	0–1	4–1	0–1	5–4	4–0
Fulham	0–0	5–1	2–2	0–0	1–3	0–1		2–2	4–2	2–2	4–1	2–2	5–1	2–3	0–1	1–2	3–1	4–1	3–1	3–4	2–2	4–2
Leeds United	3–1	0–2	1–1	3–1	1–0	1–1	3–1		3–1	2–1	0–0	3–1	5–0	1–1	2–0	1–0	0–1	3–0	2–1	3–2	2–1	2–1
Leicester City	2–1	5–0	3–0	5–1	3–2	2–2	0–2	0–0		2–1	2–1	1–2	4–2	3–0	2–2	0–1	1–1	4–2	1–2	0–1	2–1	5–4
Liverpool	0–0	1–0	1–3	2–0	2–1	0–0	2–2	5–0	3–2		3–2	0–0	3–1	4–0	1–0	1–1	2–1	2–1	2–2	0–0	0–1	2–0
Manchester City	1–1	1–1	1–0	1–0	1–4	1–0	3–0	2–1	1–3	2–1		1–1	1–1	1–1	1–1	0–0	1–1	3–1	1–0	1–2	2–2	1–4
Manchester United	1–0	3–1	4–0	4–1	1–1	3–0	2–1	0–0	5–2	2–2	1–0		3–2	1–0	2–0	2–0	3–0	0–0	5–0	1–0	5–3	3–0
Newcastle United	2–1	0–3	2–1	1–1	2–2	0–3	1–1	1–2	1–0	0–2	2–0	0–0		0–0	1–0	3–1	3–1	3–1	0–3	0–2	1–3	1–0
Nottingham Forest	2–1	3–0	2–0	4–1	0–0	1–0	2–1	1–0	1–0	1–1	2–0	4–1	3–0		3–1	1–1	3–1	1–2	3–1	1–1	2–1	1–0
Sheffield United	1–1	3–3	1–1	1–1	3–0	0–0	4–0	1–4	0–1	0–1	1–0	2–1	0–1	1–2		1–0	2–0	2–1	2–0	2–1	4–3	3–1
Sheffield Wednesday	1–1	2–0	3–0	7–0	6–1	1–2	1–1	0–0	1–1	0–1	1–0	2–2	0–0	0–2	2–2		4–1	1–3	5–0	1–0	1–0	0–2
Southampton	2–1	6–2	1–5	4–0	0–3	1–3	4–2	0–2	4–4	1–2	1–1	1–2	2–0	2–1	2–3	4–2		3–2	3–1	0–1	2–2	6–2
Stoke City	2–2	6–1	2–0	4–3	1–1	2–1	1–2	0–0	3–1	2–0	0–1	3–0	0–1	1–2	3–0	0–2	3–2		3–0	2–0	1–1	1–1
Sunderland	1–3	2–1	4–0	4–3	2–0	0–2	3–1	0–2	2–3	2–2	1–0	0–0	3–0	1–0	4–1	2–0	2–0	2–1		0–1	2–2	2–4
Tottenham Hotspur	3–1	0–1	1–3	2–0	1–1	2–0	4–2	3–1	2–0	2–1	1–1	2–1	4–0	2–1	2–0	2–1	5–3	2–0	1–0		0–0	3–4
West Bromwich Albion	0–1	2–1	3–1	1–2	0–1	1–0	5–1	2–0	1–0	2–1	0–3	3–4	6–1	1–2	1–2	1–2	3–2	0–1	2–2	3–0		3–1
West Ham United	2–2	2–1	4–0	3–2	1–2	2–3	6–1	0–1	0–1	1–1	1–1	1–6	3–0	3–1	0–2	3–0	2–2	1–1	2–2	0–2	3–0	

Updated to match(es) played on unknown. Source: Ian Laschke: Rothmans Book of Football League Records 1888–89 to 1978–79. Macdonald and Jane’s, London & Sydney, 1980.
Legend: Blue = home team win; Yellow = draw; Red = away team win.

== Top scorers ==
Rank	Player	Club	Goals
1	(Wales) Ron Davies	Southampton	37
2	(England) Geoff Hurst	West Ham United	29
3	(England) Jimmy Greaves	Tottenham Hotspur	25
4	(England) Allan Clarke	Fulham	24
5	(Scotland) Denis Law	Manchester United	23
