= Steve Phillips (footballer, born 1954) =

English footballer

Personal information
- Full name: Steven Edward Phillips
- Date of birth: 4 August 1954 (age 72)
- Place of birth: Edmonton, England
- Height: 5 ft 6 in (1.68 m)
- Position: Forward

Youth career
- 1970–1971: Birmingham City

Senior career*
Years	Team	Apps	(Gls)
1971–1975	Birmingham City	20	(1)
1974–1975	→ Torquay United (loan)	6	(0)
1975–1977	Northampton Town	51	(9)
1977–1980	Brentford	157	(65)
1980–1982	Northampton Town	75	(29)
1982–1986	Southend United	158	(66)
1986	→ Torquay United (loan)	32	(11)
1986–1988	Peterborough United	48	(16)
1987	→ Exeter City (loan)	6	(1)
1988	→ Chesterfield (loan)	9	(2)
1988–19??	Stamford		
Total		562	(200)

International career
1973	England Youth	4	(1)
- * Club domestic league appearances and goals

Steven Edward Phillips (born 4 August 1954) is an English former professional footballer who had a long career as a forward for a number of teams in the Football League in the 1970s and 1980s. He scored 200 goals from 562 league appearances.

== Club career ==
Phillips was born in Edmonton, London. He began his football career as an apprentice with Birmingham City, turning professional in August 1971. His first-team debut, as a substitute in the 3–2 defeat of Carlisle United in the Football League Second Division, came the same month, at the age of 17 years 17 days, which made him at the time the club's second-youngest debutant. He played six more games in the starting eleven before losing his place; the arrival of Bob Hatton in October meant he failed to regain it. Birmingham's promotion to the First Division, and the establishment of Hatton, Bob Latchford and Trevor Francis as the forward line of choice, gave Phillips few opportunities in the first team, though he did score his first goal, in a 4–2 defeat to Tottenham Hotspur in February 1974. After a spell on loan at Torquay United, Phillips joined Fourth Division club Northampton Town in October 1975 for a fee of £5,000.

Phillips scored nine goals from his 51 league appearances for Northampton before moving on to Brentford in February 1977. In his first full season at Brentford, Phillips finished as the Football League's leading scorer with 32 goals and his partnership with Andrew McCulloch made a major contribution to the club's promotion to the Third Division. Phillips scored 69 goals from 167 appearances for Brentford and was inducted into the club's Hall of Fame in 2019. He was sold back to his former club Northampton Town in August 1980 for a fee of £40,000. He scored 29 goals from 75 league games in this spell at the club, form which led to his inclusion in the PFA Fourth Division Team of the Year for the 1980–81 season.

After 18 months he moved on again, this time to Southend United in March 1982, a move which meant he played 48 league games in a 46-game season: having already played 30 league games for Northampton by the time the transfer went through, he added a further 18 for Southend. Phillips was Southend's leading scorer in each of his first three full seasons, an achievement to which was added the club's Player of the Season award in 1984–85. He finished his Southend career with 72 goals from 182 games in all competitions, 66 from 158 in the league. He rejoined Torquay United in January 1986, and went on to play for Peterborough United and for Exeter City and Chesterfield on loan.

== International career ==
When England youth team manager Tony Waiters selected Phillips for the 1973 UEFA Youth (under-18) Tournament to be staged in Italy, the Football Association asked him to reconsider, on the grounds of the player's potential for disruptive behaviour; Waiters insisted on Phillips remaining in the squad. The player showed his unhappiness at not being in the starting eleven, to the extent that Waiters threatened to send him home, but when England reached the final against their East German counterparts, Phillips came off the substitutes' bench to score the winning goal.

== After football ==
In 1999, he opened a bar in Benalmádena, Spain. He later returned to England, where he ran pubs. Phillips is now the sponsorship manager at Wellingborough Town F.C.
