= Bill Dodgin Jr. =

English footballer and manager

Bill Dodgin
Personal information
- Full name: William Dodgin
- Date of birth: 4 November 1931
- Place of birth: Gateshead, England
- Date of death: 17 June 2000 (aged 68)
- Place of death: Woking, England
- Position: Centre half

Senior career*
Years	Team	Apps	(Gls)
1948–1949	Southampton	0	(0)
1949–1952	Fulham	35	(0)
1952–1961	Arsenal	191	(0)
1961–1964	Fulham	69	(0)
Total		295	(0)

International career
1954	England U23	1	(0)

Managerial career
- 1968: Queens Park Rangers
- 1969–1972: Fulham
- 1973–1976: Northampton Town
- 1976–1980: Brentford
- 1980–1982: Northampton Town
- 1984–1985: Woking
- * Club domestic league appearances and goals

William Dodgin (4 November 1931 – 17 June 2000) was an English football player and manager.

== Club career ==
Dodgin was born in Wardley, Gateshead, and was the son of footballer Bill Dodgin Sr. and the nephew of footballer Norman Dodgin. He began his career as an amateur, before signing for Southampton, whom his father managed. When Dodgin Sr. moved to Fulham in 1949, his son followed him there, although he still had to wait two years before making his debut in December 1951, against Preston North End at left back.

He soon switched to right back, before Fulham were relegated to the Second Division. Feeling the pressure from the fans (who questioned whether he would have been picked, were his father not manager), Dodgin transferred to Arsenal for a fee of £4,000 in December 1952, having played 35 League matches for the Cottagers. By now, he was a centre half, and after a spell in the reserves he made his debut against Bolton Wanderers on 15 April 1953. Arsenal won the old First Division in 1952–53 but the Bolton game was his only contribution to that success.

After the departure of regular centre half Ray Daniel to Sunderland that summer, Dodgin became first choice at the back for Arsenal, missing only three matches that season. However, despite his height, Dodgin was a rather cumbersome defender, and could not live up to the performances of his predecessor. He was dropped at the start of 1954–55 in favour of Jim Fotheringham. He returned in 1956–57 and was a regular in the side for the next four seasons. All through this time, Arsenal were going through a barren patch, and apart from a third-place finish in 1958–59, they were never close to winning a trophy. In total he played 208 matches for Arsenal, scoring only one goal.

Dodgin was given a free transfer in March 1961 and returned to his old club Fulham. However, he broke his leg in a match against Aston Villa in 1962 and the injury effectively ended his career; he played only seven more games.

== International career ==
Although Dodgin played for and captained England at under-23 level, he never appeared for the full international team.

== Management career ==
After retiring from the game, Dodgin became a coach, first at Millwall, then at Queens Park Rangers, where the club had its 1967 League Cup win. He became QPR's caretaker manager in August 1968 before leaving the club in November of that year. During his tenure at Loftus Road, he presided over the club's worst start in its history, a run of 12 games without a win.

He then took the manager's job at Fulham in December 1968. Although the club were relegated from the Second Division to the Third that season, Dodgin stayed with the club and they were promoted to the Second Division in 1971. However, Fulham struggled to stay afloat in the Second Division, and despite avoiding relegation in 1972 he was sacked.

Dodgin later managed Northampton Town and Brentford, winning promotion from the Fourth Division with both clubs. He then managed Northampton Town for a second, less successful spell and finally Woking before retiring. He died after a long battle with Alzheimers in 2000, aged 68.

== Honours ==
=== Player ===
Arsenal

- FA Charity Shield: 1953

=== Coach ===
Queens Park Rangers

- League Cup: 1966–67
