= 1985–86 Isthmian League =

Football league season

The 1985–86 season was the 71st season of the Isthmian League, which is an English football competition featuring semi-professional and amateur clubs from London, East and South East England. League consisted of three divisions. Division Two was divided into two sections.

Sutton United won the league for the second season in a row and finally were promoted to the Conference.

== Premier Division ==
Isthmian League Premier Division
- Season: 1985–86
- Champions: Sutton United
- Promoted: Sutton United
- Relegated: Billericay Town; Epsom & Ewell
- Matches: 462
- Goals: 1,444 (3.13 per match)

The Premier Division consisted of 22 clubs, including 19 clubs from the previous season and three new clubs:

- Farnborough Town, promoted as champions of Division One
- Kingstonian, promoted as runners-up in Division One
- Yeovil Town, relegated from the Alliance Premier League

=== League table ===
Pos	Team	Pld	W	D	L	GF	GA	GD	Pts	Promotion or relegation
1	Sutton United	42	29	8	5	109	39	+70	95	Promoted to the Football Conference
2	Yeovil Town	42	28	7	7	92	48	+44	91	
3	Farnborough Town	42	23	8	11	90	50	+40	77	
4	Croydon	42	23	7	12	70	50	+20	76	
5	Harrow Borough	42	21	8	13	76	66	+10	71	
6	Slough Town	42	18	8	16	66	68	−2	62	
7	Bishop's Stortford	42	17	10	15	55	61	−6	61	
8	Kingstonian	42	15	15	12	57	56	+1	60	
9	Dulwich Hamlet	42	17	9	16	64	79	−15	60	
10	Wokingham Town	42	16	10	16	67	64	+3	58	
11	Windsor & Eton	42	17	7	18	58	75	−17	58	
12	Tooting & Mitcham United	42	14	11	17	65	76	−11	53	
13	Walthamstow Avenue	42	12	14	16	69	70	−1	50	
14	Worthing	42	13	10	19	72	82	−10	49	
15	Bognor Regis Town	42	15	6	21	63	70	−7	48 (Note: Bognor Regis Town were deducted three points.)	
16	Hayes	42	10	17	15	36	42	−6	47	
17	Hitchin Town	42	11	14	17	53	69	−16	47	
18	Barking	42	11	13	18	45	55	−10	46	
19	Hendon	42	10	13	19	59	77	−18	43	
20	Carshalton Athletic	42	9	13	20	56	79	−23	40	
21	Billericay Town	42	9	12	21	59	78	−19	39	Relegated to Division One
22	Epsom & Ewell	42	8	12	22	63	90	−27	36	Relegated to Division One

Source: fchd.com rsssf.com
Rules for classification: 1) points; 2) goal difference; 3) number of goals scored.

=== Stadia and locations ===
Locations of the Premier Division clubs
Greater London Premier Division football clubs
Somerset Premier Division football clubs

Club	Stadium
Barking	Mayesbrook Park
Billericay Town	New Lodge
Bishop's Stortford	Woodside Park
Bognor Regis Town	Nyewood Lane
Carshalton Athletic	War Memorial Sports Ground
Croydon	Croydon Sports Arena
Dulwich Hamlet	Champion Hill
Epsom & Ewell	Merland Rise
Farnborough Town	Cherrywood Road
Hayes	Church Road
Harrow Borough	Earlsmead Stadium
Hendon	Claremont Road
Hitchin Town	Top Field
Kingstonian	Kingsmeadow
Slough Town	Wexham Park
Sutton United	Gander Green Lane
Tooting & Mitcham United	Imperial Fields
Walthamstow Avenue	Green Pond Road
Windsor & Eton	Stag Meadow
Wokingham Town	Cantley Park
Worthing	Woodside Road
Yeovil Town	Huish Park

== Division One ==
Isthmian League Division One
- Season: 1985–86
- Champions: St Albans City
- Promoted: Bromley; St Albans City
- Relegated: Aveley; Chesham United; Harlow Town; Hornchurch
- Matches: 462
- Goals: 1,387 (3 per match)

Division One consisted of 22 clubs, including 16 clubs from the previous season and six new clubs:

Two clubs relegated from the Premier Division:

- Harlow Town
- Leytonstone/Ilford

Two clubs promoted from Division Two North:

- Finchley
- Leyton-Wingate

Two clubs promoted from Division Two South:

- Grays Athletic
- Uxbridge

=== League table ===
Pos	Team	Pld	W	D	L	GF	GA	GD	Pts	Promotion or relegation
1	St Albans City	42	23	11	8	92	61	+31	80	Promoted to the Premier Division
2	Bromley	42	24	8	10	68	41	+27	80	Promoted to the Premier Division
3	Wembley	42	22	12	8	59	30	+29	78	
4	Oxford City	42	22	11	9	75	51	+24	77	
5	Hampton	42	21	11	10	63	45	+18	74	
6	Leyton-Wingate	42	21	10	11	77	56	+21	73	
7	Uxbridge	42	20	8	14	64	49	+15	68	
8	Staines Town	42	18	10	14	69	66	+3	64	
9	Boreham Wood	42	15	16	11	62	54	+8	61	
10	Walton & Hersham	42	16	10	16	68	71	−3	58	
11	Lewes	42	16	8	18	61	75	−14	56	
12	Leytonstone/Ilford	42	13	15	14	57	67	−10	54	
13	Finchley	42	12	17	13	61	59	+2	53	
14	Grays Athletic	42	13	11	18	69	75	−6	50	
15	Leatherhead	42	14	8	20	62	68	−6	50	
16	Tilbury	42	13	11	18	60	66	−6	50	
17	Maidenhead United	42	13	7	22	61	67	−6	46	
18	Basildon United	42	12	9	21	52	72	−20	45	
19	Hornchurch	42	11	11	20	44	59	−15	44	Relegated to Division Two North
20	Chesham United	42	12	6	24	51	87	−36	42	Relegated to Division Two North
21	Harlow Town	42	8	14	20	53	70	−17	38	Relegated to Division Two North
22	Aveley	42	8	6	28	59	98	−39	30	Relegated to Division Two North

Source: fchd.com rsssf.com
Rules for classification: 1) points; 2) goal difference; 3) number of goals scored.

=== Stadia and locations ===
Locations of the Division One clubs
Greater London Division One football clubs

Club	Stadium
Aveley	The Mill Field
Basildon United	Gardiners Close
Boreham Wood	Meadow Park
Bromley	Hayes Lane
Chesham United	The Meadow
Finchley	Summers Lane
Grays Athletic	New Recreation Ground
Harlow Town	Harlow Sportcentre
Hampton	Beveree Stadium
Hornchurch	Hornchurch Stadium
Leatherhead	Fetcham Grove
Lewes	The Dripping Pan
Leytonstone/Ilford	Victoria Road
Leyton-Wingate	Wadham Lodge
Maidenhead United	York Road
Oxford City	Marsh Lane
St Albans City	Clarence Park
Staines Town	Wheatsheaf Park
Tilbury	Chadfields
Uxbridge	Honeycroft
Walton & Hersham	The Sports Ground
Wembley	Vale Farm

== Division Two North ==
Isthmian League Division Two North
- Season: 1985–86
- Champions: Stevenage Borough
- Promoted: Kingsbury Town; Stevenage Borough
- Matches: 380
- Goals: 1,128 (2.97 per match)

Division Two North consisted of 20 clubs, including 16 clubs from the previous season and four new clubs:

- Clapton, relegated from Division One
- Hertford Town, relegated Division One
- Rainham Town, transferred from Division Two South
- Vauxhall Motors, joined from the South Midlands League

=== League table ===
Pos	Team	Pld	W	D	L	GF	GA	GD	Pts	Promotion or relegation
1	Stevenage Borough	38	26	6	6	71	24	+47	84	Promoted to Division One
2	Kingsbury Town	38	25	8	5	84	35	+49	83	Promoted to Division One
3	Heybridge Swifts	38	20	8	10	65	46	+19	68	
4	Cheshunt	38	18	10	10	60	40	+20	64	
5	Hertford Town	38	17	7	14	60	50	+10	58	
6	Chalfont St Peter	38	15	11	12	53	50	+3	56	Transferred to Division Two South
7	Tring Town	38	14	13	11	58	46	+12	55	
8	Royston Town	38	13	13	12	59	57	+2	52	
9	Saffron Walden Town	38	13	12	13	61	65	−4	51	
10	Berkhamsted Town	38	14	8	16	45	52	−7	50	
11	Haringey Borough	38	14	7	17	49	51	−2	49	
12	Letchworth Garden City	38	13	8	17	46	52	−6	47	
13	Rainham Town	38	14	4	20	54	91	−37	46	
14	Hemel Hempstead	38	12	9	17	50	66	−16	45	
15	Ware	38	11	11	16	56	61	−5	44	
16	Vauxhall Motors	38	11	10	17	58	62	−4	43	
17	Barton Rovers	38	12	7	19	50	60	−10	43	
18	Harefield United	38	9	12	17	56	72	−16	39	Transferred to Division Two South
19	Clapton	38	10	7	21	51	90	−39	37	
20	Wolverton Town	38	8	11	19	42	58	−16	35	

Source: fchd.com rsssf.com
Rules for classification: 1) points; 2) goal difference; 3) number of goals scored.

=== Stadia and locations ===
Locations of the Division Two North clubs
Greater London Division Two North football clubs

Club	Stadium
Barton Rovers	Sharpenhoe Road
Berkhamsted Town	Broadwater
Chalfont St Peter	Mill Meadow
Cheshunt	Cheshunt Stadium
Clapton	The Old Spotted Dog Ground
Harefield United	Preston Park
Haringey Borough	Coles Park
Hemel Hempstead	Vauxhall Road
Hertford Town	Hertingfordbury Park
Heybridge Swifts	Scraley Road
Kingsbury Town	Avenue Park
Letchworth Garden City	Baldock Road
Rainham Town	Deri Park
Royston Town	Garden Walk
Saffron Walden Town	Catons Lane
Stevenage Borough	The Lamex Stadium
Tring Town	Pendley Ground
Vauxhall Motors	Brache Estate
Ware	Wodson Park
Wolverton Town	Wolverton Park

== Division Two South ==
Isthmian League Division Two South
- Season: 1985–86
- Champions: Grays Athletic
- Promoted: Grays Athletic; Uxbridge
- Matches: 380
- Goals: 1,243 (3.27 per match)

Division Two South consisted of 20 clubs, including 15 clubs from the previous season and five new clubs:

- Flackwell Heath, transferred from Division Two North
- Marlow, transferred from Division Two North
- Metropolitan Police, relegated from Division One
- Southwick, joined from the Combined Counties League
- Woking, relegated from Division One

=== League table ===
Pos	Team	Pld	W	D	L	GF	GA	GD	Pts	Promotion or relegation
1	Southwick	38	25	8	5	86	34	+52	83	Promoted to Division One
2	Bracknell Town	38	24	9	5	80	23	+57	81	Promoted to Division One
3	Woking	38	23	9	6	94	45	+49	78	
4	Newbury Town	38	22	7	9	86	53	+33	73	
5	Whyteleafe	38	21	10	7	61	41	+20	73	
6	Molesey	38	21	8	9	59	39	+20	71	
7	Metropolitan Police	38	20	6	12	72	48	+24	66	
8	Southall	38	19	7	12	77	59	+18	64	
9	Dorking	38	18	10	10	70	57	+13	64	
10	Feltham	38	16	7	15	65	60	+5	55	
11	Banstead Athletic	38	15	8	15	60	66	−6	53	
12	Petersfield United	38	12	9	17	61	71	−10	45	
13	Hungerford Town	38	11	6	21	57	78	−21	39	
14	Flackwell Heath	38	11	6	21	46	72	−26	39	
15	Eastbourne United	38	9	8	21	51	81	−30	35	
16	Camberley Town	38	9	7	22	53	64	−11	34	
17	Egham Town	38	7	8	23	41	83	−42	29	
18	Horsham	38	6	10	22	33	74	−41	28	
19	Ruislip Manor	38	5	12	21	44	87	−43	27	
20	Marlow	38	6	5	27	47	108	−61	23	

Source: fchd.com rsssf.com
Rules for classification: 1) points; 2) goal difference; 3) number of goals scored.

=== Stadia and locations ===
Locations of the Division Two South clubs
Greater London Division Two South football clubs

Club	Stadium
Banstead Athletic	Merland Rise
Bracknell Town	Larges Lane
Camberley Town	Kroomer Park
Dorking	Meadowbank Stadium
Eastbourne United	The Oval
Egham Town	The Runnymede Stadium
Feltham	The Orchard
Flackwell Heath	Wilks Park
Horsham	Queen Street
Hungerford Town	Bulpit Lane
Marlow	Alfred Davis Memorial Ground
Metropolitan Police	Imber Court
Molesey	Walton Road Stadium
Newbury Town	Town Ground
Petersfield United	The Southdowns Builders Stadium
Ruislip Manor	Grosvenor Vale
Southall	Robert Parker Stadium
Southwick	Old Barn Way
Whyteleafe	Church Road
Woking	The Laithwaite Community Stadium

== See also ==
- Isthmian League
- 1985–86 Northern Premier League
- 1985–86 Southern Football League
