= Stephen Wilkins =

English footballer

Personal information
- Date of birth: 31 August 1959 (age 67)
- Place of birth: Hillingdon, England
- Position: Midfielder

Youth career
- –1978: Chelsea

Senior career*
Years	Team	Apps	(Gls)
1978	Brentford	0	(0)
1978–	Dagenham		
- Walthamstow Avenue
–1980	Ruislip Manor		
1980–1982	Hayes	103	(21)
1982	Chesham United		
1982–1986	Hendon	73	(12)
1985	Peterborough United	0	(0)
1986	Farnborough Town	5	(1)
- Ruislip Manor
- Staines Town
- Walton & Hersham
- * Club domestic league appearances and goals

Stephen Wilkins (born 31 August 1959) is an English retired footballer who played as a midfielder. He had a long career in non-League football and made cup appearances for Football League clubs Brentford and Peterborough United. He is a member of the Wilkins football family, with his father George and brothers Ray, Dean and Graham also being former professional footballers.

== Career ==
Wilkins began his career as an apprentice at Chelsea and departed in 1978 without making a senior appearance. He joined Third Division club Brentford on trial during the 1978–79 pre-season and made his professional debut in a League Cup match early in the regular season. He departed Griffin Park a short time afterwards and embarked on a career in non-League football, playing for Dagenham, Walthamstow Avenue, Ruislip Manor, Hayes, Chesham United and Hendon. While with Isthmian League Premier Division club Hendon, Wilkins moved to Fourth Division club Peterborough United on non-contract terms in early 1985. He made one appearance for the club, which came in a 2–0 Football League Trophy Southern Section first round second leg defeat to rivals Cambridge United on 5 February. He later played for Farnborough Town, Ruislip Manor (second spell), Staines Town and Walton & Hersham. He also had a spell playing in New Zealand.

== Career statistics ==
Appearances and goals by club, season and competition
Club	Season	League			FA Cup		League Cup		Other		Total	
Club	Season	Division	Apps	Goals	Apps	Goals	Apps	Goals	Apps	Goals	Apps	Goals
Brentford	1978–79	Third Division	0	0	—		1	0	—		1	0
Hendon	1983–84	Isthmian League Premier Division	33	8	3	1	—		7 (Note: 3 appearances and 1 goal in Middlesex Senior Cup, 2 appearances in Isthmian League Cup, 1 appearance in FA Trophy, 1 appearance in London Senior Cup)	1	43	10
Hendon	1984–85	Isthmian League Premier Division	29	3	1	1	—		7 (Note: 3 appearances in Middlesex Senior Charity Cup, 2 appearances in Middlesex Senior Cup, 1 appearance and 1 goal in Isthmian League Cup, 1 appearance in FA Trophy)	1	37	5
Hendon	1985–86	Isthmian League Premier Division	11	1	0	0	—		2 (Note: 2 appearances in Middlesex Senior Cup)	0	13	1
Hendon	Total		73	12	4	2	—		16	2	93	16
Peterborough United	1984–85	Fourth Division	0	0	—		—		1 (Note: Appearance in Football League Trophy)	0	1	0
Farnborough Town	1986–87	Isthmian League Premier Division	5	1	0	0	—		0	0	5	1
Career total			78	13	4	2	1	0	17	2	100	17

== Honours ==
Hendon

- Middlesex Senior Charity Cup: 1984–85
