= 1984–85 Isthmian League =

The 1984–85 season was the 70th season of the Isthmian League, which is an English football competition featuring semi-professional and amateur clubs from London, East and South East England.

The league consisted of three divisions. After 19 clubs, mainly from the Athenian League joined the league, Division Two was divided into two sections.

Also, it was the first Isthmian League season as an Alliance Premier League feeder league. Sutton United were champions, winning their second Isthmian League title. Wycombe Wanderers were promoted to the APL, as Sutton United and Worthing were ineligible for promotion. Epping Town resigned from the league before their last game of the season and folded; their record was expunged.

== Premier Division ==
Isthmian League Premier Division
- Season: 1984–85
- Champions: Sutton United
- Promoted: Wycombe Wanderers
- Relegated: Harlow Town; Leytonstone/Ilford
- Matches: 462
- Goals: 1,412 (3.06 per match)

The Premier Division consisted of 22 clubs, including 20 clubs from the previous season and two new clubs, promoted from Division One:

- Epsom & Ewell
- Windsor & Eton

=== League table ===
Pos	Team	Pld	W	D	L	GF	GA	GD	Pts	Promotion or relegation
1	Sutton United	42	23	15	4	115	55	+60	84	
2	Worthing	42	24	8	10	89	59	+30	80	
3	Wycombe Wanderers	42	24	6	12	68	46	+22	78	Promoted to the Alliance Premier League
4	Wokingham Town	42	20	13	9	74	52	+22	73	
5	Windsor & Eton	42	19	10	13	67	55	+12	67	
6	Bognor Regis Town	42	20	6	16	67	58	+9	66	
7	Dulwich Hamlet	42	16	17	9	82	57	+25	65	
8	Harrow Borough	42	18	8	16	70	56	+14	62	
9	Hayes	42	17	8	17	60	58	+2	59	
10	Tooting & Mitcham United	42	16	11	15	64	66	−2	59	
11	Walthamstow Avenue	42	15	11	16	64	65	−1	56	
12	Croydon	42	15	12	15	62	63	−1	54 (Note: Croydon were deducted three points.)	
13	Epsom & Ewell	42	13	14	15	63	62	+1	53	
14	Slough Town	42	13	12	17	69	74	−5	51	
15	Carshalton Athletic	42	14	8	20	55	68	−13	50	
16	Bishop's Stortford	42	12	12	18	48	67	−19	48	
17	Hendon	42	9	19	14	62	65	−3	46	
18	Billericay Town	42	11	14	17	53	74	−21	46 (Note: Billericay Town were deducted one point.)	
19	Barking	42	13	7	22	43	75	−32	46	
20	Hitchin Town	42	10	15	17	55	70	−15	45	
21	Leytonstone/Ilford	42	11	10	21	37	72	−35	43	Relegated to Division One
22	Harlow Town	42	5	12	25	45	95	−50	27	Relegated to Division One

Source: fchd.com rsssf.com
Rules for classification: 1) points; 2) goal difference; 3) number of goals scored.

=== Stadia and locations ===
Locations of the Premier Division clubs
Greater London Premier Division football clubs

Club	Stadium
Barking	Mayesbrook Park
Billericay Town	New Lodge
Bishop's Stortford	Woodside Park
Bognor Regis Town	Nyewood Lane
Carshalton Athletic	War Memorial Sports Ground
Croydon	Croydon Sports Arena
Dulwich Hamlet	Champion Hill
Epsom & Ewell	Merland Rise
Hayes	Church Road
Harlow Town	Harlow Sportcentre
Harrow Borough	Earlsmead Stadium
Hendon	Claremont Road
Hitchin Town	Top Field
Leytonstone/Ilford	Victoria Road
Slough Town	Wexham Park
Sutton United	Gander Green Lane
Tooting & Mitcham United	Imperial Fields
Walthamstow Avenue	Green Pond Road
Windsor & Eton	Stag Meadow
Wokingham Town	Cantley Park
Worthing	Woodside Road
Wycombe Wanderers	Loakes Park

== Division One ==
Isthmian League Division One
- Season: 1984–85
- Champions: Farnborough Town
- Promoted: Farnborough Town; Kingstonian
- Relegated: Clapton; Hertford Town; Metropolitan Police; Woking
- Matches: 462
- Goals: 1,496 (3.24 per match)

Division One consisted of 22 clubs, including 18 clubs from the previous season and four new clubs:

Two clubs relegated from the Premier Division:

- Bromley
- Staines Town

Two clubs promoted from Division Two:

- Basildon United
- St Albans City

=== League table ===
Pos	Team	Pld	W	D	L	GF	GA	GD	Pts	Promotion or relegation
1	Farnborough Town	42	26	8	8	101	45	+56	86	Promoted to the Premier Division
2	Kingstonian	42	23	10	9	67	39	+28	79	Promoted to the Premier Division
3	Leatherhead	42	23	10	9	109	61	+48	76 (Note: Leatherhead were deducted three points.)	
4	Chesham United	42	22	8	12	78	46	+32	74	
5	Wembley	42	20	10	12	59	40	+19	70	
6	St Albans City	42	19	10	13	79	60	+19	67	
7	Tilbury	42	18	13	11	86	68	+18	67	
8	Bromley	42	18	9	15	71	64	+7	63	
9	Hampton	42	17	11	14	75	62	+13	62	
10	Staines Town	42	16	11	15	59	53	+6	59	
11	Maidenhead United	42	17	8	17	65	64	+1	59	
12	Walton & Hersham	42	16	8	18	60	69	−9	55 (Note: Walton & Hersham were deducted one point.)	
13	Aveley	42	16	7	19	62	78	−16	55	
14	Oxford City	42	14	12	16	62	53	+9	54	
15	Lewes	42	15	9	18	70	72	−2	54	
16	Basildon United	42	15	8	19	55	61	−6	53	
17	Boreham Wood	42	15	7	20	72	83	−11	52	
18	Hornchurch	42	15	6	21	55	74	−19	51	
19	Woking	42	15	6	21	60	91	−31	51	Relegated to Division Two South
20	Metropolitan Police	42	10	12	20	65	92	−27	42	Relegated to Division Two South
21	Clapton	42	5	11	26	50	124	−74	26	Relegated to Division Two North
22	Hertford Town	42	5	10	27	36	97	−61	25	Relegated to Division Two North

Source: fchd.com rsssf.com
Rules for classification: 1) points; 2) goal difference; 3) number of goals scored.

=== Stadia and locations ===
Locations of the Division One clubs
Greater London Division One football clubs

Club	Stadium
Aveley	The Mill Field
Basildon United	Gardiners Close
Boreham Wood	Meadow Park
Bromley	Hayes Lane
Chesham United	The Meadow
Clapton	The Old Spotted Dog Ground
Farnborough Town	Cherrywood Road
Hampton	Beveree Stadium
Hertford Town	Hertingfordbury Park
Hornchurch	Hornchurch Stadium
Kingstonian	Kingsmeadow
Leatherhead	Fetcham Grove
Lewes	The Dripping Pan
Maidenhead United	York Road
Metropolitan Police	Imber Court
Oxford City	Marsh Lane
St Albans City	Clarence Park
Staines Town	Wheatsheaf Park
Tilbury	Chadfields
Walton & Hersham	The Sports Ground
Wembley	Vale Farm
Woking	The Laithwaite Community Stadium

== Division Two North ==
Isthmian League Division Two North
- Season: 1984–85
- Champions: Leyton-Wingate
- Promoted: Finchley; Leyton-Wingate
- Matches: 380
- Goals: 1,176 (3.09 per match)

Division Two North consisted of 21 clubs, including eight clubs transferred from Division Two, one team relegated from Division One and twelve new teams:

- Clubs transferred from Division Two:
  - Barton Rovers
  - Epping Town
  - Finchley
  - Hemel Hempstead
  - Letchworth Garden City
  - Leyton-Wingate
  - Tring Town
  - Ware
- Club relegated from Division One:
  - Cheshunt
- Clubs joined from the Athenian League:
  - Berkhamsted Town
  - Chalfont St Peter
  - Flackwell Heath
  - Harefield United
  - Haringey Borough
  - Kingsbury Town
  - Marlow
  - Wolverton Town
- Plus:
  - Heybridge Swifts, joined from the Essex Senior League
  - Royston Town, joined from the South Midlands League
  - Saffron Walden Town, joined from the Eastern Counties League
  - Stevenage Borough, joined from the United Counties League

=== League table ===
Pos	Team	Pld	W	D	L	GF	GA	GD	Pts	Promotion or relegation
1	Leyton-Wingate	38	24	9	5	98	49	+49	81	Promoted to the Division One
2	Finchley	38	24	8	6	66	31	+35	79 (Note: Finchley were deducted one point.)	Promoted to the Division One
3	Heybridge Swifts	38	22	9	7	71	33	+38	75	
4	Stevenage Borough	38	23	6	9	79	49	+30	75	
5	Saffron Walden Town	38	22	8	8	73	31	+42	74	
6	Tring Town	38	19	11	8	76	41	+35	68	
7	Chalfont St Peter	38	17	10	11	72	41	+31	61	
8	Flackwell Heath	38	16	11	11	53	40	+13	59	Transferred to Division Two South
9	Berkhamsted Town	38	15	12	11	50	42	+8	57	
10	Letchworth Garden City	38	17	6	15	66	69	−3	57	
11	Royston Town	38	13	9	16	47	77	−30	48	
12	Cheshunt	38	14	5	19	52	57	−5	47	
13	Marlow	38	13	6	19	64	81	−17	45	Transferred to Division Two South
14	Hemel Hempstead	38	11	7	20	49	64	−15	40	
15	Barton Rovers	38	9	8	21	40	62	−22	35	
16	Wolverton Town	38	9	8	21	38	77	−39	35	
17	Kingsbury Town	38	9	7	22	53	72	−19	34	
18	Harefield United	38	7	9	22	51	81	−30	30	
19	Haringey Borough	38	6	12	20	38	79	−41	30	
20	Ware	38	7	5	26	40	100	−60	26	
21	Epping Town	0	0	0	0	0	0	0	0 (Note: Epping Town resigned from the league with one game remaining; their results were expunged.)	Resigned from the league

Source: fchd.com rsssf.com
Rules for classification: 1) points; 2) goal difference; 3) number of goals scored.

=== Stadia and locations ===
Locations of the Division Two North clubs
Greater London Division Two North football clubs

Club	Stadium
Barton Rovers	Sharpenhoe Road
Berkhamsted Town	Broadwater
Chalfont St Peter	Mill Meadow
Cheshunt	Cheshunt Stadium
Epping Town	Stonards Hill
Finchley	Summers Lane
Flackwell Heath	Wilks Park
Harefield United	Preston Park
Haringey Borough	Coles Park
Hemel Hempstead	Vauxhall Road
Heybridge Swifts	Scraley Road
Kingsbury Town	Avenue Park
Letchworth Garden City	Baldock Road
Leyton-Wingate	Wadham Lodge
Marlow	Alfred Davis Memorial Ground
Royston Town	Garden Walk
Saffron Walden Town	Catons Lane
Stevenage Borough	The Lamex Stadium
Tring Town	Pendley Ground
Ware	Wodson Park
Wolverton Town	Wolverton Park

== Division Two South ==
Isthmian League Division Two South
- Season: 1984–85
- Champions: Grays Athletic
- Promoted: Grays Athletic; Uxbridge
- Matches: 342
- Goals: 1,037 (3.03 per match)

Division Two South consisted of 19 clubs, including eleven clubs transferred from Division Two, one team relegated from Division One and seven new clubs:

Clubs transferred from Division Two:

- Dorking
- Eastbourne United
- Egham Town
- Grays Athletic
- Horsham
- Hungerford Town
- Molesey
- Newbury Town
- Rainham Town
- Southall
- Uxbridge

Club relegated from Division One:

- Feltham

Clubs joined from the Athenian League:

- Banstead Athletic
- Camberley Town
- Chertsey Town
- Ruislip Manor
- Whyteleafe

Plus:

- Bracknell Town, joined from the London Spartan League
- Petersfield United, joined from the Hampshire League

=== League table ===
Pos	Team	Pld	W	D	L	GF	GA	GD	Pts	Promotion or relegation
1	Grays Athletic	36	24	9	3	84	25	+59	81	Promoted to Division One
2	Uxbridge	36	22	10	4	81	20	+61	76	Promoted to Division One
3	Molesey	36	20	5	11	62	42	+20	65	
4	Hungerford Town	36	18	9	9	71	49	+22	63	
5	Whyteleafe	36	17	10	9	66	34	+32	61	
6	Egham Town	36	17	7	12	54	42	+12	58	
7	Southall	36	18	3	15	54	57	−3	57	
8	Bracknell Town	36	15	7	14	54	48	+6	52	
9	Banstead Athletic	36	14	8	14	63	70	−7	50	
10	Horsham	36	13	10	13	44	39	+5	49	
11	Ruislip Manor	36	13	10	13	48	49	−1	49	
12	Dorking	36	12	11	13	45	50	−5	47	
13	Rainham Town	36	12	8	16	58	61	−3	44	Transferred to Division Two North
14	Feltham	36	10	13	13	44	58	−14	43	
15	Camberley Town	36	10	12	14	44	54	−10	42	
16	Eastbourne United	36	10	9	17	66	72	−6	39	
17	Petersfield United	36	9	5	22	41	80	−39	32	
18	Newbury Town	36	8	7	21	35	69	−34	16 (Note: Newbury Town were deducted 15 points.)	
19	Chertsey Town	36	2	3	31	23	118	−95	6 (Note: Chertsey Town were deducted three points.)	Resigned and joined the Combined Counties League

Source: fchd.com rsssf.com
Rules for classification: 1) points; 2) goal difference; 3) number of goals scored.

=== Stadia and locations ===
Locations of the Division Two South clubs
Greater London Division Two South football clubs

Club	Stadium
Banstead Athletic	Merland Rise
Bracknell Town	Larges Lane
Camberley Town	Kroomer Park
Chertsey Town	Alwyns Lane
Dorking	Meadowbank Stadium
Eastbourne United	The Oval
Egham Town	The Runnymede Stadium
Feltham	The Orchard
Grays Athletic	New Recreation Ground
Horsham	Queen Street
Hungerford Town	Bulpit Lane
Molesey	Walton Road Stadium
Newbury Town	Town Ground
Petersfield United	The Southdowns Builders Stadium
Rainham Town	Deri Park
Ruislip Manor	Grosvenor Vale
Southall	Robert Parker Stadium
Uxbridge	Honeycroft
Whyteleafe	Church Road

== See also ==
- Isthmian League
- 1984–85 Northern Premier League
- 1984–85 Southern Football League
