= Feltham F.C. =

Feltham F.C. may refer to:

- Feltham F.C. (1946), a club founded in 1946 as Tudor Park, which merged with Hounslow in 1991 to form Feltham & Hounslow Borough
- Feltham F.C. (1991), a club founded in 1991 as Feltham & Hounslow Borough and later renamed Feltham
