= Charlie Drinkwater =

English footballer and manager

Personal information
- Full name: Charles John Drinkwater
- Date of birth: 25 July 1914
- Place of birth: Willesden, England
- Date of death: 8 April 1998 (aged 83)
- Place of death: Denham, England
- Height: 5 ft 4 1/2 in (1.64 m)
- Position: Outside left

Senior career*
Years	Team	Apps	(Gls)
1932–1933	Hampstead	0	(0)
1933	Northfleet United		
1933–1934	Golders Green	24	(7)
1934	Brentford	0	(0)
1934–1935	Golders Green	23	(8)
1935	Walthamstow Avenue		
1935–1938	Aston Villa	2	(1)
1938–1939	Charlton Athletic	3	(0)
1941	Watford	0	(0)
1944–1947	Watford	1	(0)
1951–1953	Ruislip Manor		

International career
	England Juniors	1	(0)

Managerial career
- 1951–1953: Ruislip Manor (player-manager)
- * Club domestic league appearances and goals

Charles John Drinkwater (25 July 1914 – 8 April 1998) was an English professional footballer who played in the Football League for Aston Villa, Charlton Athletic and Watford as an outside left. He later served Ruislip Manor as player-manager.

== Club career ==
=== Non-League football (1932–1935) ===
Drinkwater began his career at Athenian League club Hampstead in 1932 and failed to make an appearance before moving to Northfleet United in March 1933. He returned to Hampstead shortly afterwards and made his debut for the club in the penultimate game of the 1932–33 season, a 4–1 victory over Uxbridge Town. Drinkwater remained with Hampstead (then renamed Golders Green) for the 1933–34 season and scored his first goal for the club in the opening game of the season, a 2–1 defeat to Walthamstow Avenue. He scored 10 goals in 36 appearances during the campaign and helped the Greens to a third-place finish in the league.

Drinkwater's form earned him a move to Second Division club Brentford as an amateur in June 1934, but he failed to make an appearance for the first team and returned to Golders Green for the start of the 1934–35 season. Drinkwater moved to fellow Athenian League club Walthamstow Avenue before the end of the season.

=== Football League (1935–1947) ===
Drinkwater received another chance at League football when he signed for First Division club Aston Villa as an amateur in August 1935. He signed a professional contract October that year. Drinkwater's professional debut came in a league match versus Chelsea on 16 November 1935. He instantly made a name for himself when he scored within three minutes of the kick-off. The Straits Times reported that Drinkwater "trapped a centre with the coolness of a veteran, steadied himself and drove the ball into the net". After one further appearance, he joined First Division club Charlton Athletic in July 1938, but made just three appearances before being released during the 1939 off-season.

The breakout of the Second World War halted competitive football until 1946, but Drinkwater signed for Watford during the war. His war service took him away from the club, but he re-signed in October 1944 and was an ever-present during the 1945–46 season, when an enlarged FA Cup programme was played. When competitive league play returned, Drinkwater made just one appearance during Watford's 1946–47 Third Division South season and he left Vicarage Road at the end of the campaign.

=== Return to non-League football (1951–1953) ===
After a spell training and coaching Pinner, Drinkwater resumed his playing career in April 1951, when he joined London League club Ruislip Manor as player-manager. He achieved a runners-up finish in the 1952–53 season and left the club in October 1953.

== Representative career ==
Burns made appearances for touring team Middlesex Wanderers in 1935.

== International career ==
Drinkwater won one cap for England Juniors in 1935.

== Personal life ==
During the Second World War, Drinkwater served in the Royal Navy as a Physical Training Instructor. After the war, he worked at Mount Vernon Hospital as a remedial gymnast for 30 years.

== Career statistics ==
Appearances and goals by club, season and competition
Club	Season	League			FA Cup		Other		Total	
Club	Season	Division	Apps	Goals	Apps	Goals	Apps	Goals	Apps	Goals
Golders Green	1932–33	Athenian League	1	0	0	0	—		1	0
Golders Green	1933–34	Athenian League	23	7	1	1	12 (Note: 4 appearances and 1 goal in FA Amateur Cup, 4 appearances and 1 goal in Middlesex Senior Cup, 3 appearances in Middlesex Senior Charity Cup, 1 appearance in London Senior Cup)	2	36	10
Golders Green	Total		24	7	1	1	12	2	37	10
Golders Green	1934–35	Athenian League	23	8	3	1	11 (Note: 4 appearances and 2 goals in Amateur Football Alliance Senior Cup, 3 appearances in Middlesex Senior Charity Cup, 2 appearances and 1 goal in London Senior Cup, 1 appearance in FA Amateur Cup, 1 appearance in Middlesex Senior Cup)	3	37	12
Golders Green	1935–36	Athenian League	3	2	1	2	—		4	4
Golders Green	Total		50	15	5	4	23	5	78	26
Aston Villa	1935–36	First Division	2	1	0	0	—		2	1
Watford	1945–46	—			2	0	—		2	0
Watford	1946–47	Third Division South	1	0	0	0	—		1	0
Watford	Total		1	0	2	0	—		3	0
Career total			53	16	7	4	23	5	83	25
