= 1983–84 Athenian League =

Athenian League
- Season: 1983–84
- Champions: Redhill
- Promoted: 8 clubs to Isthmian League Division Two North; 5 clubs to Isthmian League Division Two South
- Relegated: None

The 1983–84 Athenian League season was the 61st and the last in the history of Athenian League. The league consisted of 21 teams.

== Clubs ==
The league joined 3 new teams:

- Harwich & Parkeston, relegated from Isthmian League Division Two
- Wolverton Town, from London Spartan League Senior Division
- Berkhamsted Town, from London Spartan League Premier Division

== League table ==
| Pos | Team | Pld | W | D | L | GF | GA | GR | Pts | Promotion or relegation |
|---|---|---|---|---|---|---|---|---|---|---|
| 1 | Redhill (C) | 40 | 28 | 9 | 3 | 73 | 28 | 2.607 | 93 | Left to join London Spartan League |
| 2 | Chalfont St.Peter (P) | 40 | 27 | 10 | 3 | 88 | 32 | 2.750 | 91 | Promotion to Isthmian League Division Two North |
| 3 | Burnham | 40 | 27 | 7 | 6 | 80 | 29 | 2.759 | 88 | Left to join London Spartan League |
| 4 | Whyteleafe (P) | 40 | 24 | 8 | 8 | 63 | 32 | 1.969 | 80 | Promotion to Isthmian League Division Two South |
| 5 | Flackwell Heath (P) | 40 | 21 | 7 | 12 | 57 | 37 | 1.541 | 70 | Promotion to Isthmian League Division Two North |
| 6 | Harefield United (P) | 40 | 20 | 8 | 12 | 62 | 47 | 1.319 | 68 | Promotion to Isthmian League Division Two North |
| 7 | Banstead Athletic (P) | 40 | 19 | 10 | 11 | 63 | 48 | 1.313 | 67 | Promotion to Isthmian League Division Two South |
| 8 | Marlow (P) | 40 | 17 | 7 | 16 | 65 | 63 | 1.032 | 58 | Promotion to Isthmian League Division Two North |
| 9 | Hoddesdon Town | 40 | 15 | 13 | 12 | 53 | 52 | 1.019 | 58 | Left to join South Midlands League |
| 10 | Ruislip Manor (P) | 40 | 16 | 9 | 15 | 59 | 44 | 1.341 | 57 | Promotion to Isthmian League Division Two South |
| 11 | Kingsbury Town (P) | 40 | 15 | 12 | 13 | 58 | 52 | 1.115 | 57 | Promotion to Isthmian League Division Two North |
| 12 | Wolverton Town (P) | 40 | 12 | 12 | 16 | 59 | 65 | 0.908 | 48 | Promotion to Isthmian League Division Two North |
| 13 | Edgware | 40 | 13 | 8 | 19 | 47 | 51 | 0.922 | 47 | Left to join London Spartan League |
| 14 | Harwich & Parkeston | 40 | 13 | 9 | 18 | 54 | 66 | 0.818 | 45 (Note: Harwich & Parkeston deducted 3 points.) | Left to join Eastern Counties League |
| 15 | Chertsey Town (P) | 40 | 12 | 6 | 22 | 41 | 63 | 0.651 | 42 | Promotion to Isthmian League Division Two South |
| 16 | Berkhamsted Town (P) | 40 | 10 | 11 | 19 | 50 | 63 | 0.794 | 41 | Promotion to Isthmian League Division Two North |
| 17 | Thatcham Town | 40 | 8 | 14 | 18 | 65 | 79 | 0.823 | 35 (Note: Thatcham Town deducted 3 points.) | Left to join London Spartan League |
| 18 | Horley Town | 40 | 9 | 6 | 25 | 34 | 83 | 0.410 | 33 | Left to join Combined Counties League |
| 19 | Haringey Borough (P) | 40 | 8 | 8 | 24 | 44 | 80 | 0.550 | 32 | Promotion to Isthmian League Division Two North |
| 20 | Fleet Town | 40 | 6 | 8 | 26 | 31 | 82 | 0.378 | 26 | Left to join Combined Counties League |
| 21 | Camberley Town (P) | 40 | 4 | 10 | 26 | 35 | 85 | 0.412 | 22 | Promotion to Isthmian League Division Two South |

Source: fchd.info
Rules for classification: 1) points; 2) goal difference; 3) number of goals scored.
(C) Champions; (P) Promoted

=== Stadia and locations ===
Locations of the Athenian League clubs
Greater London Athenian League football clubs

| Club | Stadium |
|---|---|
| Banstead Athletic | Merland Rise |
| Berkhamsted Town | Broadwater |
| Burnham | The 1878 Stadium |
| Camberley Town | Kroomer Park |
| Chalfont St Peter | Mill Meadow |
| Chertsey Town | Alwyns Lane |
| Edgware | White Lion |
| Flackwell Heath | Wilks Park |
| Fleet Town | Calthorpe Park |
| Harefield United | Preston Park |
| Haringey Borough | Coles Park |
| Harwich & Parkeston | Royal Oak |
| Hoddesdon Town | Lowfield |
| Horley Town | The New Defence |
| Kingsbury Town | Avenue Park |
| Redhill | Kiln Brow |
| Ruislip Manor | Grosvenor Vale |
| Thatcham Town | Waterside Park |
| Marlow | Alfred Davis Memorial Ground |
| Whyteleafe | Church Road |
| Wolverton Town | Wolverton Park |
