= 1978–79 Brentford F.C. season =

English football team season

Brentford
1978–79 season
- Chairman: Dan Tana
- Manager: Bill Dodgin Jr.
- Stadium: Griffin Park
- Third Division: 10th
- FA Cup: First round
- League Cup: First round
- Top goalscorer: League: McCulloch, Phillips (14); All: McCulloch, Phillips (14)
- Highest home attendance: 13,873
- Lowest home attendance: 5,140
- Average home league attendance: 7,455
Home colours	Away colours

During the 1978–79 English football season, Brentford competed in the Football League Third Division. After a rude awakening to third-tier football, the Bees ended the season strongly to finish in 10th position.

== Season summary ==
After Brentford's promotion to the Third Division at the end of the previous season, manager Bill Dodgin Jr. stated that his squad would only need one or two more new players to be able to compete during the club's first season in the third tier since 1972–73. He managed to keep prolific forwards Steve Phillips and Andrew McCulloch at Griffin Park, with the former turning down a £120,000 transfer to Tottenham Hotspur. Aside from goalkeeping trialist Trevor Porter (brought in to cover for car crash-victim Len Bond and the suspended Graham Cox), Dodgin made no significant signings.

Fears that Brentford's largely-unchanged squad would be out of its depth in the Third Division were heightened after the season began with a 7–1 aggregate defeat to fellow third-tier side Watford in the first round of the League Cup. A dire start to the league season, which had seen Brentford sink into the relegation places by the end of September 1978, led manager Bill Dodgin Jr. to act in the transfer market. Potentially club-record breaking bids for Watford's Alan Mayes, Queens Park Rangers' Tony Hazell and Bristol City's John Bain were all rejected. Dodgin managed to sign defender Jim McNichol from Luton Town for a new club-record incoming fee of £30,000. While McNichol went on to be voted the Brentford Supporters' Player of the Year, Dodgin's other signing, forward Dean Smith (signed to support the misfiring Steve Phillips and Andrew McCulloch), only scored sporadically during the remainder of the season.

Between late-October 1978 and mid-March 1979, the Bees stabilised with a run of just two defeats in 17 league matches. The run ended with the club's biggest win of the season – a 6–0 thrashing of Chester at Griffin Park, with Steve Phillips scoring a hat-trick to boost his tally to six goals in four matches. The signing of Jim McNichol made an immediate impact on the defensive line, with a record of two clean sheets prior to his arrival being turned around to 14 in the following 31 matches, equivalent to a clean sheet nearly every other match. A failure to win any of the following four matches dropped the Bees back to 18th position, but a strong run of 9 wins in 12 matches to close out the season elevated the club to a 10th-place finish.

== League table ==
Pos	Team	Pld	W	D	L	GF	GA	GD	Pts
8	Hull City	46	19	11	16	66	61	+5	49
9	Exeter City	46	17	15	14	61	56	+5	49
10	Brentford	46	19	9	18	53	49	+4	47
11	Oxford United	46	14	18	14	44	50	−6	46
12	Blackpool	46	18	9	19	61	59	+2	45

Source: rsssf.com

== Results ==
Brentford's goal tally listed first.

=== Legend ===
Win	Draw	Loss

=== Pre-season and friendlies ===
Date	Opponent	Venue	Result	Attendance	Scorer(s)
1 August 1978	Charlton Athletic	H	1–1	2,500	Phillips
3 August 1978	Chesham United	A	0–0	n/a	
7 August 1978	Brighton & Hove Albion	H	1–4	2,800	J. Graham
8 August 1978	Woking	A	0–3	n/a	
9 August 1978	Aldershot	A	2–1	n/a	Phillips, Kruse
15 December 1978	Northampton Town	A	0–3	n/a	

=== Football League Third Division ===
No.	Date	Opponent	Venue	Result	Attendance	Scorer(s)
1	19 August 1978	Shrewsbury Town	A	0–1	2,346	
2	21 August 1978	Colchester United	H	1–0	6,802	Kruse
3	26 August 1978	Chesterfield	H	0–3	6,162	
4	2 September 1978	Exeter City	A	2–2	3,645	McCulloch (2)
5	9 September 1978	Hull City	H	1–0	6,528	Phillips
6	12 September 1978	Swindon Town	A	0–2	6,902	
7	16 September 1978	Peterborough United	A	1–3	5,884	Kruse
8	23 September 1978	Gillingham	H	0–2	6,977	
9	25 September 1978	Lincoln City	H	2–1	6,107	J. Graham, Eames
10	30 September 1978	Swansea City	A	1–2	11,370	McCulloch
11	7 October 1978	Bury	H	0–1	5,855	
12	14 October 1978	Watford	A	0–2	15,180	
13	17 October 1978	Rotherham United	A	0–1	3,881	
14	21 October 1978	Tranmere Rovers	H	2–1	5,883	McCulloch (2)
15	28 October 1978	Chester	A	1–3	4,495	McCulloch
16	4 November 1978	Oxford United	H	3–0	6,863	McCulloch, D. Smith (2)
17	11 November 1978	Exeter City	H	0–0	6,387	
18	18 November 1978	Chesterfield	A	0–0	4,584	
19	2 December 1978	Walsall	H	1–0	5,140	McCulloch
20	9 December 1978	Mansfield Town	A	1–2	4,003	McCulloch
21	23 December 1978	Southend United	A	1–1	13,703	Phillips
22	26 December 1978	Plymouth Argyle	H	2–1	7,367	D. Smith (2)
23	30 December 1978	Carlisle United	H	0–0	6,477	
24	20 January 1979	Peterborough United	H	0–0	5,760	
25	27 January 1979	Gillingham	A	0–0	6,899	
26	10 February 1979	Swansea City	H	1–0	7,264	Carlton
27	24 February 1979	Watford	H	3–3	13,873	D. Smith, Phillips (2, 1 pen)
28	3 March 1979	Tranmere Rovers	A	1–0	1,882	Phillips
29	6 March 1979	Hull City	A	0–1	3,418	
30	10 March 1979	Chester	H	6–0	6,421	Phillips (3), Glover (2), McCulloch
31	13 March 1979	Sheffield Wednesday	A	0–1	10,383	
32	21 March 1979	Lincoln City	A	0–1	2,060	
33	24 March 1979	Colchester United	A	1–1	3,528	Shrubb
34	26 March 1979	Shrewsbury Town	H	2–3	7,756	McCulloch, D. Smith
35	31 March 1979	Blackpool	H	3–2	6,364	McNichol (2), Phillips
36	4 April 1979	Oxford United	A	1–0	5,242	Shrubb
37	7 April 1979	Walsall	A	3–2	3,840	Kruse, Phillips (2)
38	13 April 1979	Southend United	H	3–2	11,509	McCulloch, Kruse, Salman
39	14 April 1979	Plymouth Argyle	A	1–2	6,344	Carlton
40	17 April 1979	Sheffield Wednesday	H	2–1	9,050	McNichol (2)
41	21 April 1979	Carlisle United	A	0–1	3,967	
42	23 April 1979	Rotherham United	H	1–0	6,758	D. Smith
43	28 April 1979	Mansfield Town	H	1–0	6,838	Phillips
44	5 May 1979	Blackpool	A	1–0	3,464	McCulloch
45	8 May 1979	Swindon Town	H	1–2	13,320	D. Smith
46	15 May 1979	Bury	A	3–2	2,512	Phillips (2), McCulloch

=== FA Cup ===
Round	Date	Opponent	Venue	Result	Attendance
1R	25 November 1978	Exeter City	A	0–1	3,810

=== Football League Cup ===
Round	Date	Opponent	Venue	Result	Attendance	Scorer
1R (1st leg)	12 August 1978	Watford	A	0–4	9,292	
1R (2nd leg)	12 August 1978	Watford	H	1–3 (lost 7–1 on aggregate)	7,414	Rolph

- Sources: 100 Years of Brentford, The Big Brentford Book of the Seventies, Statto

== Playing squad ==
Players' ages are as of the opening day of the 1978–79 season.

Pos.	Name	Nat.	Date of birth (age)	Signed from	Signed in	Notes
Goalkeepers
GK	Len Bond	(England)	12 January 1954 (aged 24)	Bristol City	1977	
GK	Trevor Porter	(England)	16 October 1956 (aged 21)	Slough Town	1978	
Defenders
DF	Michael Allen	(England)	30 March 1949 (aged 29)	Middlesbrough	1971	
DF	John Fraser	(England)	12 July 1953 (aged 25)	Fulham	1976	
DF	Pat Kruse	(England)	30 November 1953 (aged 24)	Torquay United	1977	
DF	Jim McNichol	(Scotland)	9 June 1958 (aged 20)	Luton Town	1978	
DF	Danis Salman	(England)	12 March 1960 (aged 18)	Youth	1975	
DF	David Silman	(England)	28 October 1959 (aged 18)	Unattached	1978	
DF	Barry Tucker	(Wales)	28 August 1952 (aged 25)	Northampton Town	1978	
Midfielders
MF	Doug Allder	(England)	30 December 1951 (aged 26)	Unattached	1977	
MF	Bob Booker	(England)	25 January 1958 (aged 20)	Bedmond Sports & Social	1978	
MF	Dave Carlton	(England)	24 November 1952 (aged 25)	Northampton Town	1976	
MF	Allan Glover	(England)	21 October 1950 (aged 27)	Orient	1978	
MF	Jackie Graham (c)	(Scotland)	16 July 1946 (aged 32)	Guildford City	1970	
MF	Willie Graham	(Northern Ireland)	14 February 1959 (aged 19)	Northampton Town	1977	
MF	Paul Shrubb	(England)	1 August 1955 (aged 23)	Hellenic	1977	
MF	Paul Walker	(England)	17 December 1960 (aged 17)	Youth	1976	
Forwards
FW	Tommy Baldwin	(England)	10 June 1945 (aged 33)	Unattached	1977	Assistant manager
FW	Andrew McCulloch	(England)	3 January 1950 (aged 28)	Oxford United	1976	Loaned to Oakland Stompers
FW	Gary Rolph	(England)	24 February 1960 (aged 18)	Youth	1976	
FW	Steve Phillips	(England)	4 August 1954 (aged 24)	Northampton Town	1977	
FW	Dean Smith	(England)	28 November 1958 (aged 19)	Leicester City	1977	
Players who left the club mid-season
DF	Nigel Smith	(England)	3 July 1958 (aged 20)	Queens Park Rangers	1975	Released
DF	Stephen Wilkins	(England)	31 August 1959 (aged 18)	Chelsea	1978	Released
FW	Billy Eames	(England)	20 September 1957 (aged 20)	Waterlooville	1978	Released
FW	Lee Frost	(England)	4 December 1957 (aged 20)	Chelsea	1978	Returned to Chelsea after loan

- Sources: The Big Brentford Book of the Seventies, Timeless Bees

== Coaching staff ==
Name	Role
(England) Bill Dodgin Jr.	Manager
(England) Tommy Baldwin	Assistant Manager
(England) Eddie Lyons	Physiotherapist
(England) Gordon Quinn	Chief Scout

== Statistics ==
=== Appearances and goals ===
Substitute appearances in brackets.

Pos	Nat	Name	League		FA Cup		League Cup		Total	
Pos	Nat	Name	Apps	Goals	Apps	Goals	Apps	Goals	Apps	Goals
GK	(England)	Len Bond	35	0	1	0	0	0	36	0
GK	(England)	Trevor Porter	11	0	0	0	2	0	13	0
DF	(England)	Michael Allen	5 (2)	0	0	0	0	0	5 (2)	0
DF	(England)	John Fraser	21 (2)	0	0	0	0 (1)	0	21 (3)	0
DF	(England)	Pat Kruse	44	4	1	0	2	0	47	4
DF	(Scotland)	Jim McNichol	32	4	1	0	—		33	4
DF	(England)	Danis Salman	39 (1)	1	1	0	2	0	42 (1)	1
DF	(England)	David Silman	1	0	0	0	0	0	1	0
DF	(England)	Nigel Smith	2 (1)	0	0	0	0	0	2 (1)	0
DF	(Wales)	Barry Tucker	43	0	1	0	2	0	46	0
DF	(England)	Stephen Wilkins	0	0	—		0 (1)	0	0 (1)	0
MF	(England)	Doug Allder	18 (12)	0	0	0	2	0	20 (12)	0
MF	(England)	Bob Booker	2 (1)	0	0	0	—		2 (1)	0
MF	(England)	Dave Carlton	36 (1)	2	1	0	2	0	39 (1)	2
MF	(England)	Allan Glover	18 (1)	2	1	0	—		19 (1)	2
MF	(Scotland)	Jackie Graham	35	1	1	0	2	0	38	1
MF	(Northern Ireland)	Willie Graham	8 (3)	0	0	0	2	0	10 (3)	0
MF	(England)	Paul Shrubb	39	2	1	0	2	0	42	2
MF	(England)	Paul Walker	2 (5)	0	0	0	0	0	2 (5)	0
FW	(England)	Tommy Baldwin	0	0	0	0	1	0	1	0
FW	(England)	Billy Eames	2	1	—		0	0	2	1
FW	(England)	Andrew McCulloch	39	14	1	0	0	0	40	14
FW	(England)	Gary Rolph	1	0	0	0	1	1	2	1
FW	(England)	Steve Phillips	46	14	1	0	2	0	49	14
FW	(England)	Dean Smith	22 (3)	8	0 (1)	0	—		22 (4)	8
Players loaned in during the season
FW	(England)	Lee Frost	5 (1)	0	—		—		5 (1)	0

- Players listed in italics left the club mid-season.
- Source: 100 Years of Brentford

=== Goalscorers ===
Pos.	Nat	Player	FL3	FAC	FLC	Total
FW	(England)	Andrew McCulloch	14	0	—	14
FW	(England)	Steve Phillips	14	0	0	14
FW	(England)	Dean Smith	8	0	—	8
DF	(England)	Pat Kruse	4	0	0	4
DF	(Scotland)	Jim McNichol	4	0	0	4
MF	(England)	Dave Carlton	2	0	0	2
MF	(England)	Allan Glover	2	0	0	2
MF	(England)	Paul Shrubb	2	0	0	2
FW	(England)	Billy Eames	1	—	0	1
MF	(Scotland)	Jackie Graham	1	0	0	1
FW	(England)	Gary Rolph	0	0	1	1
DF	(England)	Danis Salman	1	0	0	1
Total			53	0	1	54

- Players listed in italics left the club mid-season.
- Source: 100 Years of Brentford

=== Management ===
Name	Nat	From	To	Record All Comps					Record League				
Name	Nat	From	To	P	W	D	L	W %	P	W	D	L	W %
Bill Dodgin, Jr.	(England)	12 August 1978	15 May 1979	49	19	9	21	38.78	46	19	9	18	41.30

=== Summary ===
Games played	49 (46 Third Division, 1 FA Cup, 2 League Cup)
Games won	19 (19 Third Division, 0 FA Cup, 0 League Cup)
Games drawn	9 (9 Third Division, 0 FA Cup, 0 League Cup)
Games lost	21 (18 Third Division, 1 FA Cup, 2 League Cup)
Goals scored	54 (53 Third Division, 0 FA Cup, 1 League Cup)
Goals conceded	57 (49 Third Division, 1 FA Cup, 7 League Cup)
Clean sheets	16 (16 Third Division, 0 FA Cup, 0 League Cup)
Biggest league win	6–0 versus Chester, 10 March 1979
Worst league defeat	3–0 versus Chesterfield, 26 August 1978
Most appearances	49, Steve Phillips (46 Third Division, 1 FA Cup, 2 League Cup)
Top scorer (league)	14, Andrew McCulloch, Steve Phillips
Top scorer (all competitions)	14, Andrew McCulloch, Steve Phillips

== Transfers & loans ==
Players transferred in
Date	Pos.	Name	Previous club	Fee	Ref.
August 1978	FW	(England) Billy Eames	(England) Portsmouth	Trial	
August 1978	GK	(England) Trevor Porter	(England) Slough Town	Trial	
September 1978	MF	(England) Bob Booker	(England) Bedmond Sports & Social	Non-contract	
October 1978	DF	(Scotland) Jim McNichol	(England) Luton Town	£30,000	
October 1978	FW	(England) Dean Smith	(England) Leicester City	£20,000	
November 1978	MF	(England) Allan Glover	(England) Orient	Free	
1978	DF	(England) Stephen Wilkins	(England) Chelsea	n/a	
April 1979	FW	(England) Bradley Walsh	n/a	Non-contract	
Players loaned in
Date from	Pos.	Name	From	Date to	Ref.
October 1978	FW	(England) Lee Frost	(England) Chelsea	November 1978	
Players loaned out
Date from	Pos.	Name	To	Date to	Ref.
May 1978	FW	(England) Andrew McCulloch	(United States) Oakland Stompers	August 1978	
October 1978	GK	(England) Graham Cox	(England) Margate	n/a	
Players released
Date	Pos.	Name	Subsequent club	Join date	Ref.
August 1978	DF	(England) Stephen Wilkins	(England) Dagenham	1978	
October 1978	FW	(England) Billy Eames	n/a	n/a	
October 1978	DF	(England) Nigel Smith	(England) Cambridge United	November 1978	
December 1978	FW	(England) John Murray	Retired		
May 1979	DF	(England) Michael Allen	(England) Whitby Town	1979	
May 1979	GK	(England) Graham Cox	(England) Wokingham Town	1979	
May 1979	FW	(England) Gary Rolph	(England) Woking	1979	
May 1979	DF	(England) David Silman	(England) Walthamstow Avenue	1979	

== Awards ==
- Supporters' Player of the Year: Jim McNichol
- Players' Player of the Year: Len Bond
