= 1983–84 Isthmian League =

The 1983–84 season was the 69th season of the Isthmian League, an English football competition.

Harrow Borough were champions, winning their first Isthmian League title. There was no promotion from the Isthmian League to the Alliance Premier League till 1985. Windsor & Eton finished first in Division One achieving the second promotion in a row. Corinthian-Casuals were excluded from the league after new groundsharing ruled were introduced.

At the end of the season Division Two was split into two sections after 19 clubs, mainly from the Athenian League joined Division Two. Thus, the Athenian League was finally absorbed by Isthmian League.

== Premier Division ==
Isthmian League Premier Division
- Season: 1983–84
- Champions: Harrow Borough
- Relegated: Bromley; Staines Town
- Matches: 462
- Goals: 1,339 (2.9 per match)

The Premier Division consisted of 22 clubs, including 20 clubs from the previous season and two new clubs, promoted from Division One:

- Harlow Town
- Worthing

Also, at the end of the previous season Leytonstone & Ilford changed name into Leytonstone/Ilford.

At the end of the season Staines Town were demoted to Division One due to ground grading, thus, Tooting & Mitcham United were reprieved.

=== League table ===
Pos	Team	Pld	W	D	L	GF	GA	GD	Pts	Relegation
1	Harrow Borough	42	25	13	4	73	42	+31	88	
2	Worthing	42	20	11	11	89	72	+17	71	
3	Slough Town	42	20	9	13	73	56	+17	69	
4	Sutton United	42	18	12	12	67	45	+22	66	
5	Hayes	42	17	13	12	56	41	+15	64	
6	Hitchin Town	42	16	15	11	58	57	+1	63	
7	Wycombe Wanderers	42	16	14	12	63	52	+11	62	
8	Wokingham Town	42	18	10	14	78	55	+23	61 (Note: Wokingham Town were deducted three points.)	
9	Hendon	42	17	10	15	62	51	+11	61	
10	Dulwich Hamlet	42	16	11	15	61	64	−3	59	
11	Bishop's Stortford	42	15	13	14	56	57	−1	58	
12	Harlow Town	42	15	11	16	64	70	−6	56	
13	Bognor Regis Town	42	14	13	15	62	69	−7	55	
14	Staines Town	42	15	9	18	63	72	−9	54	Demoted to Division One
15	Billericay Town	42	15	8	19	53	73	−20	53	
16	Barking	42	13	13	16	60	64	−4	52	
17	Croydon	42	14	10	18	52	58	−6	52	
18	Walthamstow Avenue	42	13	10	19	53	67	−14	49	
19	Leytonstone/Ilford	42	13	9	20	54	67	−13	48	
20	Carshalton Athletic	42	11	10	21	59	72	−13	43	
21	Tooting & Mitcham United	42	10	13	19	50	63	−13	43	Reprieved from relegation
22	Bromley	42	7	11	24	33	72	−39	32	Relegated to Division One

Source: fchd.com rsssf.com
Rules for classification: 1) points; 2) goal difference; 3) number of goals scored.

=== Stadia and locations ===
Locations of the Premier Division clubs
Greater London Premier Division football clubs

Club	Stadium
Barking	Mayesbrook Park
Billericay Town	New Lodge
Bishop's Stortford	Woodside Park
Bognor Regis Town	Nyewood Lane
Bromley	Hayes Lane
Carshalton Athletic	War Memorial Sports Ground
Croydon	Croydon Sports Arena
Dulwich Hamlet	Champion Hill
Hayes	Church Road
Harlow Town	Harlow Sportcentre
Harrow Borough	Earlsmead Stadium
Hendon	Claremont Road
Hitchin Town	Top Field
Leytonstone/Ilford	Victoria Road
Slough Town	Wexham Park
Staines Town	Wheatsheaf Park
Sutton United	Gander Green Lane
Tooting & Mitcham United	Imperial Fields
Walthamstow Avenue	Green Pond Road
Wokingham Town	Cantley Park
Worthing	Woodside Road
Wycombe Wanderers	Adams Park

== Division One ==
Isthmian League Division One
- Season: 1983–84
- Champions: Windsor & Eton
- Promoted: Epsom & Ewell; Windsor & Eton
- Relegated: Cheshunt; Feltham
- Matches: 462
- Goals: 1,319 (2.85 per match)

Division One consisted of 22 clubs, including 18 clubs from the previous season and four new clubs:

Two clubs relegated from the Premier Division:

- Leatherhead
- Woking

Two clubs promoted from Division Two:

- Clapton
- Windsor & Eton

=== League table ===
Pos	Team	Pld	W	D	L	GF	GA	GD	Pts	Promotion or relegation
1	Windsor & Eton	42	26	7	9	89	44	+45	85	Promoted to the Premier Division
2	Epsom & Ewell	42	23	9	10	73	51	+22	78	Promoted to the Premier Division
3	Wembley	42	21	11	10	65	32	+33	74	
4	Maidenhead United	42	22	8	12	67	42	+25	74	
5	Boreham Wood	42	22	7	13	74	43	+31	73	
6	Farnborough Town	42	18	12	12	78	60	+18	66	
7	Hampton	42	18	12	12	65	49	+16	66	
8	Metropolitan Police	42	20	5	17	79	64	+15	65	
9	Chesham United	42	18	8	16	64	57	+7	62	
10	Tilbury	42	17	10	15	54	64	−10	61	
11	Leatherhead	42	15	10	17	67	56	+11	55	
12	Aveley	42	15	10	17	49	53	−4	55	
13	Woking	42	16	7	19	66	73	−7	55	
14	Hertford Town	42	15	9	18	56	73	−17	54	
15	Oxford City	42	14	9	19	57	56	+1	51	
16	Lewes	42	13	12	17	49	65	−16	51	
17	Walton & Hersham	42	13	10	19	52	70	−18	49	
18	Hornchurch	42	13	10	19	43	63	−20	49	
19	Kingstonian	42	13	9	20	47	67	−20	48	
20	Clapton	42	12	11	19	49	67	−18	47	
21	Cheshunt	42	12	8	22	45	64	−19	44	Relegated to Division Two North
22	Feltham	42	7	4	31	31	106	−75	25	Relegated to Division Two South

Source: fchd.com rsssf.com
Rules for classification: 1) points; 2) goal difference; 3) number of goals scored.

=== Stadia and locations ===
Locations of the Division One clubs
Greater London Division One football clubs

Club	Stadium
Aveley	The Mill Field
Boreham Wood	Meadow Park
Chesham United	The Meadow
Cheshunt	Cheshunt Stadium
Clapton	The Old Spotted Dog Ground
Epsom & Ewell	Merland Rise
Farnborough Town	Cherrywood Road
Feltham	The Orchard
Hampton	Beveree Stadium
Hertford Town	Hertingfordbury Park
Hornchurch	Hornchurch Stadium
Kingstonian	Kingsmeadow
Leatherhead	Fetcham Grove
Lewes	The Dripping Pan
Maidenhead United	York Road
Metropolitan Police	Imber Court
Oxford City	Marsh Lane
Tilbury	Chadfields
Walton & Hersham	The Sports Ground
Wembley	Vale Farm
Windsor & Eton	Stag Meadow
Woking	The Laithwaite Community Stadium

== Division Two ==
Isthmian League Division Two
- Season: 1983–84
- Champions: Basildon United
- Promoted: Basildon United; St Albans City
- Matches: 462
- Goals: 1,415 (3.06 per match)

Division Two consisted of 22 clubs, including 19 clubs from the previous season and three new clubs:

- Grays Athletic, joined from the Athenian League
- Newbury Town, joined from the Athenian League
- St Albans City, relegated from Division One

Before the start of the season Dorking Town was renamed Dorking.

At the end of the season Corinthian Casuals were excluded from the league, while Division Two was split into Division Two North and Division Two South with a number of the Athenian League clubs joining.

=== League table ===
Pos	Team	Pld	W	D	L	GF	GA	GD	Pts	Promotion or relegation
1	Basildon United	42	30	7	5	88	27	+61	97	Promoted to Division One
2	St Albans City	42	29	9	4	100	46	+54	96	Promoted to Division One
3	Leyton-Wingate	42	29	4	9	97	41	+56	91	Placed to Division Two North
4	Tring Town	42	23	11	8	89	44	+45	80	Placed to Division Two North
5	Corinthian-Casuals	42	23	11	8	75	47	+28	80	Resigned and joined the London Spartan League
6	Hungerford Town	42	21	12	9	94	47	+47	75	Placed to Division Two South
7	Uxbridge	42	18	15	9	61	36	+25	69	Placed to Division Two South
8	Grays Athletic	42	20	9	13	72	57	+15	69	Placed to Division Two South
9	Dorking	42	21	5	16	66	54	+12	68	Placed to Division Two South
10	Southall	42	20	8	14	79	60	+19	65 (Note: Southall were deducted three points.)	Placed to Division Two South
11	Egham Town	42	16	15	11	59	49	+10	63	Placed to Division Two South
12	Epping Town	42	15	16	11	61	50	+11	61	Placed to Division Two North
13	Molesey	42	13	14	15	59	68	−9	53	Placed to Division Two South
14	Barton Rovers	42	15	8	19	54	64	−10	53	Placed to Division Two North
15	Letchworth Garden City	42	15	7	20	48	66	−18	52	Placed to Division Two North
16	Newbury Town	42	14	5	23	60	82	−22	47	Placed to Division Two South
17	Hemel Hempstead	42	12	9	21	63	69	−6	45	Placed to Division Two North
18	Rainham Town	42	7	5	30	38	114	−76	26	Placed to Division Two South
19	Finchley	42	5	9	28	28	78	−50	24	Placed to Division Two North
20	Eastbourne United	42	7	3	32	36	98	−62	24	Placed to Division Two South
21	Ware	42	6	6	30	48	114	−66	24	Placed to Division Two North
22	Horsham	42	7	4	31	40	104	−64	24 (Note: Horsham were deducted one point.)	Placed to Division Two South

Source: fchd.com rsssf.com
Rules for classification: 1) points; 2) goal difference; 3) number of goals scored.

=== Stadia and locations ===
Locations of the Division Two clubs
Greater London Division Two football clubs

Club	Stadium
Barton Rovers	Sharpenhoe Road
Basildon United	Gardiners Close
Corinthian-Casuals	King George's Field
Dorking	Meadowbank Stadium
Eastbourne United	The Oval
Egham Town	The Runnymede Stadium
Epping Town	Stonards Hill
Finchley	Summers Lane
Grays Athletic	New Recreation Ground
Hemel Hempstead	Vauxhall Road
Horsham	Queen Street
Hungerford Town	Bulpit Lane
Letchworth Garden City	Baldock Road
Leyton-Wingate	Wadham Lodge
Molesey	Walton Road Stadium
Newbury Town	Town Ground
Rainham Town	Deri Park
St Albans City	Clarence Park
Southall	Robert Parker Stadium
Tring Town	Pendley Ground
Uxbridge	Honeycroft
Ware	Wodson Park
