= Billy Eames =

English footballer

Personal information
- Full name: William Alan Eames
- Date of birth: 20 September 1957 (age 69)
- Place of birth: Emsworth, England
- Position: Midfielder

Youth career
- 1973–1975: Portsmouth

Senior career*
| Years | Team | Apps | (Gls) |
| 1975–1978 | Portsmouth | 12 | (1) |
| 1978 | Waterlooville | | |
| 1978 | Brentford | 2 | (1) |
- * Club domestic league appearances and goals

William Alan Eames (born 20 September 1957) is an English retired professional footballer who played as a midfielder in the Football League for Portsmouth and Brentford. He went on to play for over 15 years in non-League football.

== Personal life ==
Eames attended Emsworth Primary School. He later became a PE teacher at Neville Lovett Community School, Horndean Technology College and Cams Hill School.

== Career statistics ==
Appearances and goals by club, season and competition
| Club | Season | League | | | FA Cup | | League Cup | | Other | | Total | |
| Club | Season | Division | Apps | Goals | Apps | Goals | Apps | Goals | Apps | Goals | Apps | Goals |
|---|---|---|---|---|---|---|---|---|---|---|---|---|
| Portsmouth | 1975–76 | Second Division | 11 | 1 | 4 | 1 | 1 | 1 | — | | 16 | 3 |
| Portsmouth | 1976–77 | Third Division | 0 | 0 | 0 | 0 | 1 | 0 | 1 (Note: Appearance in Kent Senior Cup) | 0 | 2 | 0 |
| Portsmouth | Total | | 11 | 1 | 4 | 1 | 2 | 1 | 1 | 0 | 18 | 3 |
| Brentford | 1978–79 | Third Division | 2 | 1 | 0 | 0 | 0 | 0 | — | | 2 | 1 |
| Career total | | | 13 | 1 | 4 | 1 | 2 | 1 | 1 | 0 | 20 | 4 |
