= Don Rossiter =

English footballer (1935–2016)

Personal information
- Full name: Donald Paul Rossiter
- Date of birth: 8 June 1935
- Place of birth: Strood, England
- Date of death: 18 February 2016 (aged 80)
- Place of death: Somerset, England
- Position: Forward

Youth career
- Arsenal

Senior career*
Years	Team	Apps	(Gls)
1951–1952	→ Walthamstow Avenue (loan)		
1952–1954	Arsenal	0	(0)
1954–1955	Hartlepool United	0	(0)
1955–1956	Arsenal	0	(0)
1956	Leyton Orient	1	(0)
1956–1957	Dartford		
1957	Gillingham	1	(0)
1957–1958	Dover		
1958–1960	Ashford Town	49	(16)
- Chatham Town
- Tunbridge Wells
- * Club domestic league appearances and goals

Donald Rossiter (8 June 1935 – 18 February 2016) was an English professional association football player turned politician. During his footballing career he made two appearances in The Football League and gained a winner's medal in the FA Amateur Cup. He later became active in local politics and served as Mayor of Rochester, Kent.

== Football career ==
Born in Strood, Rossiter represented Kent at football and played local youth football before being spotted by Arsenal and signed up at the age of 15. The club loaned him to amateur club Walthamstow Avenue of the Isthmian League for the 1951–52 season. Still aged just 17, he gained an FA Amateur Cup-winner's medal as Avenue defeated Leyton at Wembley Stadium. Upon his return to Arsenal in June 1952 he turned professional, but failed to make a single appearance in the first team for the "Gunners". In March 1954 he was transferred to Hartlepool United, where he again failed to break into the first team. In July 1955 Arsenal re-signed him, but he once again could not progress beyond the reserve team and he moved on to Leyton Orient in March 1956.

While with Orient he finally made his Football League debut, but he only remained with the club until August 1956, when he joined non-league club Dartford. From there he rejoined the professional ranks when he signed for another Kent-based club, Gillingham. He made one further Football League appearance when he lined up for the "Gills" against Brighton & Hove Albion in August 1957, but the following month he left the club and joined non-league Dover. He later played for Ashford Town, Chatham Town and Tunbridge Wells before retiring. He also had a stint as manager of Chatham Town.

== Post-football career ==
After leaving football, Rossiter became involved in local politics in the Medway towns. He was elected to the Medway District Council and spent a year as Mayor of Rochester between 1985 and 1986. He died in 2016 in Somerset.
