= Dean Smith (footballer, born 1958) =

English footballer

Personal information
- Full name: Dean Smith
- Date of birth: 28 November 1958
- Place of birth: Leicester, England
- Date of death: 17 April 2009 (aged 50)
- Place of death: Leicester, England
- Height: 5 ft 10 in (1.78 m)
- Position: Forward

Youth career
- 1975–1977: Leicester City

Senior career*
Years	Team	Apps	(Gls)
1977–1978	Leicester City	10	(1)
1978	→ Houston Hurricane (loan)	17	(6)
1978–1980	Brentford	54	(15)
1980–1981	Nuneaton Borough	4	(0)
- Shepshed Charterhouse
- Enderby Town
- Hinckley Town
- Corby Town
- St Andrews
- Oadby Town
- * Club domestic league appearances and goals

Dean Smith (28 November 1958 – 17 April 2009) was an English professional footballer who played as a forward in the Football League for Leicester City and Brentford.

== Career ==
=== Leicester City ===
A forward, Smith began his career in the youth system at hometown First Division club Leicester City in April 1975 and progressed to sign his first professional contract in December 1976. Smith had to wait until September 1977 to make his first team debut, which came when he replaced Eddie Kelly during a 5–1 defeat to Everton. Smith's most notable moment in a Foxes shirt came on 23 March 1978, when he scored his only goal for the club in a 3–2 defeat to Manchester United.

During the English off-season in the summer of 1978, Smith moved to the United States to join North American Soccer League club Houston Hurricane on loan. He scored six goals in 17 appearances for the Hurricane in a disappointing 1978 season, which saw the club finish bottom of the American Conference Central Division.

Smith made 10 appearances during the 1977–78 season, but departed Filbert Street in October 1978 after failing to make an appearance during the early months of the 1978–79 season.

=== Brentford ===
Smith signed for Third Division club Brentford for a £20,000 fee in October 1978. He made something of a breakthrough into the first team, making 26 appearances and scoring eight goals during the 1978–79 season. Smith made a further 25 appearances during the 1979–80 season, but the arrival of Fred Callaghan as manager changed the team's style of play and he drifted out of the first team picture. Smith departed Brentford in February 1981, after being suspended by the club for a breach of discipline. He made 61 appearances and scored 17 goals during his time at Griffin Park.

=== Non-League football ===
After his departure from Brentford, Smith dropped into non-League football and played for Nuneaton Borough, Shepshed Charterhouse, Enderby Town, Hinckley Town, Corby Town, St Andrews and Oadby Town.

== Personal life ==
It was reported in September 2008 that Smith had suffered a stroke and was battling throat cancer. He died on 17 April 2009 at the age of 50.

== Career statistics ==
Appearances and goals by club, season and competition
Club	Season	League			National Cup		League Cup		Total	
Club	Season	Division	Apps	Goals	Apps	Goals	Apps	Goals	Apps	Goals
Leicester City	1977–78	First Division	10	1	0	0	0	0	10	1
Houston Hurricane (loan)	1978	North American Soccer League	17	6	—		—		17	6
Brentford	1978–79	Third Division	25	8	1	0	0	0	26	8
Brentford	1979–80	Third Division	22	5	1	1	2	0	25	6
Brentford	1980–81	Third Division	7	2	1	0	2	1	10	3
Brentford	Total		54	15	3	1	4	1	61	17
Career total			81	22	3	1	4	1	88	24
