= 1983–84 Essex Senior Football League =

The 1983–84 season was the 13th in the history of Essex Senior Football League, a football competition in England.

The league featured 17 clubs which competed in the league last season, no new clubs joined the league this season.

Heybridge Swifts were champions, winning their third Essex Senior League title in a row and were promoted to the Isthmian League, becoming the first Essex Senior League club promoted to a higher level league.

== League table ==
Essex Senior Football League
- Season: 1983–84
- Champions: Heybridge Swifts
- Promoted: Heybridge Swifts
- Matches: 271
- Goals: 810 (2.99 per match)

Pos	Team	Pld	W	D	L	GF	GA	GD	Pts	Promotion or relegation
1	Heybridge Swifts	32	27	3	2	65	21	+44	57	Promoted to the Isthmian League
2	Bowers United	32	17	10	5	56	25	+31	44	
3	Witham Town	32	18	6	8	61	32	+29	42	
4	Stansted	31	18	4	9	62	29	+33	40 (Note: Match between Sawbridgeworth Town and Stansted was left unplayed.)	
5	Chelmsford City reserves	32	17	4	11	62	37	+25	38	
6	Brentwood	32	14	7	11	50	45	+5	35	
7	Sawbridgeworth Town	31	14	5	12	56	40	+16	33	
8	Canvey Island	32	11	9	12	48	44	+4	31	
9	Wivenhoe Town	32	10	11	11	45	43	+2	31	
10	Ford United	32	13	5	14	49	55	−6	31	
11	Eton Manor	32	10	10	12	56	47	+9	30	
12	East Thurrock United	32	11	6	15	25	44	−19	28	
13	Maldon Town	32	11	3	18	40	53	−13	25	
14	East Ham United	32	7	9	16	41	60	−19	23	
15	Halstead Town	32	5	13	14	34	56	−22	23	
16	Brightlingsea United	32	4	14	14	41	63	−22	22	
17	Coggeshall Town	32	1	7	24	19	116	−97	9	

Source: fchd
Rules for classification: 1) points; 2) goal difference; 3) number of goals scored.
