= David Silman =

English footballer

Personal information
- Full name: David Alan Silman
- Date of birth: 28 October 1959 (age 67)
- Place of birth: Hampstead, England
- Position: Central defender

Youth career
- Wolverhampton Wanderers
- Queens Park Rangers

Senior career*
Years	Team	Apps	(Gls)
1978–1979	Brentford	1	(0)
1979–1981	Walthamstow Avenue		
- Enfield
1983–1984	Dagenham	2	(1)
1984–1985	Harrow Borough		
1985–1987	Hayes	84	(8)
- Hounslow
- Ruislip Manor
- Staines Town

Managerial career
- Hounslow Town (player-manager)
- * Club domestic league appearances and goals

David Alan Silman (born 28 October 1959) is an English retired professional footballer who made one appearance as a central defender in the Football League for Brentford. He went on to play for over a decade in non-League football and had a spell as player-manager of Hounslow.

== Career statistics ==
Appearances and goals by club, season and competition
Club	Season	League			FA Cup		League Cup		Total	
Club	Season	Division	Apps	Goals	Apps	Goals	Apps	Goals	Apps	Goals
Brentford	1978–79	Third Division	1	0	0	0	0	0	1	0
Career total			1	0	0	0	0	0	1	0
