= 1984–85 Combined Counties Football League =

The 1984–85 Combined Counties Football League season was the seventh in the history of the Combined Counties Football League, a football competition in England.

The league was won by newcomers Malden Vale for the first time. Another new club, Southwick, finished as runners-up and were promoted to the Isthmian League.

== League table ==
Combined Counties Football League
- Season: 1984–85
- Champions: Malden Vale
- Promoted: Southwick
- Matches: 342
- Goals: 1,062 (3.11 per match)

The league was increased from 17 to 19 clubs after Alton Town, Chessington United, Guildford & Worplesdon and Yateley Town left and six new clubs joined:

- Farleigh Rovers, joining from the Surrey Premier League.
- Fleet Town, joining from the Athenian League.
- Horley Town, joining from the Athenian League.
- Malden Vale, joining from the London Spartan League.
- Merstham, joining from the London Spartan League.
- Southwick, transferred from the Sussex County League.

| Pos | Team | Pld | W | D | L | GF | GA | GD | Pts | Promotion or relegation |
|---|---|---|---|---|---|---|---|---|---|---|
| 1 | Malden Vale | 36 | 24 | 10 | 2 | 82 | 33 | +49 | 82 | |
| 2 | Southwick | 36 | 25 | 5 | 6 | 103 | 37 | +66 | 80 | Promoted to the Isthmian League Division Two South |
| 3 | Merstham | 36 | 23 | 6 | 7 | 66 | 32 | +34 | 75 | |
| 4 | British Aerospace (Weybridge) | 36 | 20 | 10 | 6 | 82 | 38 | +44 | 70 | |
| 5 | Ash United | 36 | 20 | 6 | 10 | 77 | 42 | +35 | 66 | |
| 6 | Malden Town | 36 | 19 | 6 | 11 | 55 | 28 | +27 | 63 | |
| 7 | Virginia Water | 36 | 16 | 6 | 14 | 63 | 52 | +11 | 54 | |
| 8 | Westfield | 36 | 15 | 2 | 19 | 49 | 56 | −7 | 47 | |
| 9 | Godalming Town | 36 | 13 | 7 | 16 | 69 | 60 | +9 | 46 | |
| 10 | Farnham Town | 36 | 12 | 7 | 17 | 48 | 76 | −28 | 43 | |
| 11 | Farleigh Rovers | 36 | 11 | 9 | 16 | 43 | 55 | −12 | 42 | |
| 12 | Cranleigh | 36 | 11 | 9 | 16 | 47 | 62 | −15 | 42 | |
| 13 | Chobham | 36 | 10 | 9 | 17 | 40 | 53 | −13 | 39 | |
| 14 | Frimley Green | 36 | 10 | 8 | 18 | 38 | 74 | −36 | 38 | |
| 15 | Horley Town | 36 | 10 | 8 | 18 | 34 | 70 | −36 | 38 | |
| 16 | Hartley Wintney | 36 | 10 | 7 | 19 | 39 | 58 | −19 | 37 | |
| 17 | Cobham | 36 | 8 | 10 | 18 | 45 | 84 | −39 | 34 | |
| 18 | Cove | 36 | 8 | 7 | 21 | 45 | 80 | −35 | 31 | |
| 19 | Fleet Town | 36 | 7 | 8 | 21 | 37 | 72 | −35 | 29 | |

Rules for classification: The system of using goal difference to separate two teams tied on points was used.
