= 1984–85 Eastern Counties Football League =

The 1984–85 season was the 43rd in the history of Eastern Counties Football League a football competition in England.

The league featured 21 clubs which competed in the league last season, along with one new club:

- Harwich & Parkeston, transferred from the Athenian League

Braintree Town were champions, winning their second Eastern Counties Football League title in a row.

== League Table ==
Eastern Counties Football League
- Season: 1984–85
- Champions: Braintree Town
- Matches: 462
- Goals: 1,401 (3.03 per match)

| Pos | Team | Pld | W | D | L | GF | GA | GD | Pts |
|---|---|---|---|---|---|---|---|---|---|
| 1 | Braintree Town | 42 | 26 | 10 | 6 | 100 | 45 | +55 | 62 |
| 2 | Sudbury Town | 42 | 24 | 9 | 9 | 96 | 51 | +45 | 57 |
| 3 | Great Yarmouth Town | 42 | 19 | 14 | 9 | 70 | 39 | +31 | 52 |
| 4 | Lowestoft Town | 42 | 23 | 6 | 13 | 73 | 43 | +30 | 52 |
| 5 | Wisbech Town | 42 | 18 | 15 | 9 | 69 | 42 | +27 | 51 |
| 6 | March Town United | 42 | 20 | 11 | 11 | 78 | 55 | +23 | 51 |
| 7 | Colchester United reserves | 42 | 22 | 5 | 15 | 80 | 65 | +15 | 49 |
| 8 | Histon | 42 | 20 | 8 | 14 | 62 | 50 | +12 | 48 |
| 9 | Bury Town | 42 | 20 | 7 | 15 | 77 | 59 | +18 | 47 |
| 10 | Stowmarket Town | 42 | 20 | 7 | 15 | 71 | 53 | +18 | 47 |
| 11 | Gorleston | 42 | 17 | 9 | 16 | 64 | 61 | +3 | 43 |
| 12 | Soham Town Rangers | 42 | 18 | 6 | 18 | 55 | 60 | −5 | 42 |
| 13 | Tiptree United | 42 | 16 | 9 | 17 | 69 | 59 | +10 | 41 |
| 14 | Felixstowe Town | 42 | 12 | 16 | 14 | 57 | 67 | −10 | 40 |
| 15 | Chatteris Town | 42 | 12 | 12 | 18 | 51 | 75 | −24 | 36 |
| 16 | Brantham Athletic | 42 | 12 | 8 | 22 | 51 | 79 | −28 | 32 |
| 17 | Clacton Town | 42 | 10 | 11 | 21 | 50 | 72 | −22 | 31 |
| 18 | Ely City | 42 | 9 | 13 | 20 | 34 | 64 | −30 | 31 |
| 19 | Newmarket Town | 42 | 13 | 5 | 24 | 46 | 84 | −38 | 31 |
| 20 | Haverhill Rovers | 42 | 9 | 12 | 21 | 52 | 87 | −35 | 30 |
| 21 | Harwich & Parkeston | 42 | 11 | 8 | 23 | 47 | 88 | −41 | 30 |
| 22 | Thetford Town | 42 | 7 | 7 | 28 | 49 | 103 | −54 | 21 |

Source: fchd
Rules for classification: 1) points; 2) goal difference; 3) number of goals scored.
