= 1983–84 Eastern Counties Football League =

The 1983–84 season was the 42nd in the history of Eastern Counties Football League a football competition in England.

The league featured 22 clubs which competed in the league last season, no new clubs joined the league this season, though Braintree changed name to Braintree Town, Stowmarket changed name to Stowmarket Town. Braintree Town were champions, winning their first Eastern Counties Football League title.

== League table ==
Eastern Counties Football League
- Season: 1983–84
- Champions: Braintree Town
- Matches: 462
- Goals: 1,519 (3.29 per match)

Pos	Team	Pld	W	D	L	GF	GA	GD	Pts	Promotion or relegation
1	Braintree Town	42	29	9	4	125	45	+80	67	
2	Wisbech Town	42	29	9	4	91	37	+54	67	
3	Colchester United reserves	42	26	7	9	94	41	+53	59	
4	Lowestoft Town	42	24	7	11	77	46	+31	55	
5	Sudbury Town	42	21	11	10	87	56	+31	53	
6	Saffron Walden Town	42	22	8	12	88	47	+41	52	Transferred to the Isthmian League Division Two North
7	Gorleston	42	18	16	8	73	47	+26	52	
8	Tiptree United	42	20	9	13	83	64	+19	49	
9	Great Yarmouth Town	42	19	10	13	75	51	+24	48	
10	Chatteris Town	42	17	10	15	57	58	−1	44	
11	Brantham Athletic	42	16	9	17	66	68	−2	41	
12	Newmarket Town	42	16	9	17	62	73	−11	41	
13	Bury Town	42	16	8	18	69	73	−4	40	
14	Felixstowe Town	42	13	13	16	53	57	−4	39	
15	March Town United	42	13	11	18	57	63	−6	37	
16	Histon	42	12	11	19	53	60	−7	35	
17	Haverhill Rovers	42	16	3	23	68	91	−23	35	
18	Soham Town Rangers	42	11	7	24	49	90	−41	29	
19	Stowmarket Town	42	10	8	24	57	99	−42	28	
20	Ely City	42	7	8	27	45	108	−63	22	
21	Clacton Town	42	6	4	32	47	120	−73	16	
22	Thetford Town	42	6	3	33	43	125	−82	15	

Source: fchd
Rules for classification: 1) points; 2) goal difference; 3) number of goals scored.
