= Gary Rolph =

English footballer

Personal information
- Full name: Gary Leslie Rolph
- Date of birth: 24 February 1960 (age 66)
- Place of birth: Stepney, England
- Position: Forward

Senior career*
| Years | Team | Apps | (Gls) |
| 1976–1979 | Brentford | 12 | (1) |
| 1979–1980 | Woking | | |
- Billericay Town
- Leytonstone/Ilford
- * Club domestic league appearances and goals

Gary Leslie Rolph (born 24 February 1960) is an English retired footballer who played in the Football League for Brentford as a forward.

== Career ==
A graduate of the Brentford youth team, Rolph made 12 appearances and scored one goal for Brentford between 1976 and 1979. His only goal for the Bees came in a 3–2 FA Cup second round defeat to Colchester United on 20 December 1976, a strike that still holds the club record for youngest goalscorer in the FA Cup. Rolph was released at the end of the 1978–79 season and joined Isthmian League Premier Division club Woking. He later played for Billericay Town and Leytonstone/Ilford and top-scored for the former club during the 1981–82 season.

== Career statistics ==
Appearances and goals by club, season and competition
| Club | Season | League | | | FA Cup | | League Cup | | Total | |
| Club | Season | Division | Apps | Goals | Apps | Goals | Apps | Goals | Apps | Goals |
|---|---|---|---|---|---|---|---|---|---|---|
| Brentford | 1976–77 | Fourth Division | 7 | 0 | 1 | 1 | 0 | 0 | 8 | 1 |
| Brentford | 1977–78 | Fourth Division | 4 | 1 | 1 | 0 | 0 | 0 | 5 | 1 |
| Brentford | 1978–79 | Third Division | 1 | 0 | 0 | 0 | 1 | 1 | 2 | 1 |
| Career total | | | 12 | 1 | 2 | 1 | 1 | 1 | 15 | 3 |
