= Staines Town F.C. =

English football club

Coordinates: 51°25′11″N 0°30′7.5″W

Staines Town
- Full name: Staines Town Football Club
- Nickname: The Swans
- Founded: 1892; 134 years ago
- Ground: Wheatsheaf Park
- Capacity: 3,002
- Owner: The Staines Town Football Club Trust
Home colours

Staines Town Football Club is a football club based in Staines-upon-Thames, Surrey, founded in 1892. The club last competed in the Isthmian League before the limited company through which it was operated was wound up in 2022.

In 2023, Spelthorne Borough Council’s Planning Committee declined to accept that the club itself had ceased to exist. The Committee confirmed that the club’s assets are held on trust pursuant to an existing Section 106 Agreement and are legally distinct from the assets of the limited company that formerly operated the club.

== History ==
=== Early days ===
Staines Town FC was founded in 1892 and was known under various names including Staines F.C.,Staines Albany F.C., 'Staines Lagonda F.C.', and 'Staines Town F.C.', until it folded in 1935. However, prior to World War II the club re-formed as Staines Vale.

In 1953 Staines Town were founder members of the Hellenic League, where they finished runners-up in 1956. In 1958 they joined the Spartan League and won the title two years later. After finishing second in 1971, Staines Town advanced to the Athenian League, where they won the Second Division title at the first attempt, amassing a record number of points.

=== Isthmian League ===
The club were elected to the new Isthmian League Division One in 1973. In their second season, the club finished top and were promoted to the Premier Division. In a nine-year stay, the club's best finish was fourth. However, a ground grading ruling meant that the club were demoted in 1984. The club bounced back five years later only for its Premier Division status to be lost again in 1993 when the club were relegated for the first time in 63 years. Again the club were promoted in 1996 and again it was quickly lost, with the club returning to Division One after only a year.

Having lobbied Spelthorne Council on and off for 20 years, planning permission for a £6.5m conference and health facility was granted in April 2000 and finalised a year later. During construction, Staines groundshared with Walton & Hersham and Egham Town before the return to Wheatsheaf Lane on 22 February 2003.

During 2002–03 and 2003–04, Staines played in Division One South of the Isthmian League and on the last day of season 2003–04, under Steve Cordery, they secured a place in the Premier Division in the newly re-structured pyramid. The Swans spent five seasons in this division before winning promotion to the Conference South in 2009. They had finished second in the league and therefore gained promotion through the play-offs, beating Carshalton Athletic 1–0 in the final at Wheatsheaf Park on 2 May 2009. Louis Wells saved a Carshalton penalty in the 85th minute with Scott Taylor scoring the winning goal in extra time. Staines had also finished as runners up in the previous season, but had lost 2–1 to AFC Wimbledon in the playoff final after taking a first half lead but conceding two late goals in the last seven minutes.

=== Life in the Conference South ===
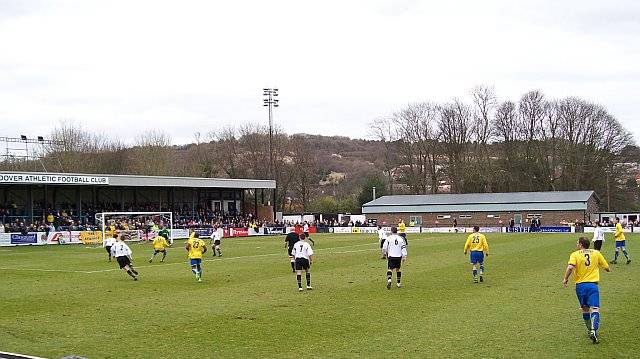
Staines (yellow shirts) playing Dover Athletic in 2009

The 2009–10 campaign marked the Swans' first ever appearance in the Conference South and they began their journey brightly, defeating Weston-Super-Mare 0–1 and Dorchester Town 3–0. A home defeat, 1–2, to Havant & Waterlooville was then followed by five consecutive draws and then a 1–3 victory away at St. Albans City. Two significant victories in late October 2009 were beating first place, and at the time unbeaten, Newport County 1–0 at home followed four days later beating third place Thurrock 1–2 away. On Boxing Day 2009, Staines won 4–1 away to rivals Hampton and Richmond Borough, following this up by beating them 4–0 at the Wheatsheaf on New Years Day 2010, with Ali Chaaban scoring a hat-trick. Another significant victory was away at Chelmsford, winning 0–1 through a Marc Charles-Smith goal, Charles-Smith's third goal in a little over 48 hours having scored twice at Dorchester only two days previously. Steve Cordery was named the Conference South manager of the month for January, 2010. Despite a magnificent February and March when Staines Town were in the play-off places, they finished in a very creditable eighth place in their first season in the Conference South.

=== Cup history ===
The club have reached the FA Cup first round proper on six occasions, in 1879, 1880, 1984 (losing 2–0 at a Neil Warnock-managed Burton Albion), 2007, 2009 and 2015. In 2007 Staines were drawn away against League Two Stockport County. A crowd of 3,460 saw Staines go behind to a Matty McNeil header but a 76th-minute equaliser from Charles-Smith earned a replay. It was announced on 12 November that the replay would be shown on Sky Sports, resulting in a £75,000 windfall for each club. Staines Town completed the improbable upset as they won the match in penalty kicks (4–3, two magnificent saves by Swans goalkeeper Shaun Allaway, the winning penalty scored by Dave Sargent) after drawing 1–1 in extra time, after having taken the lead in the eighth minute with an Adrian Toppin goal. In the next round they faced Peterborough United at home, and were beaten 5–0. Sir Alex Ferguson (father of Peterborough manager Darren) and Sir Trevor Brooking were among the guests of Staines Town FC on the day.

On 7 November 2009 they beat League Two Shrewsbury Town 0–1 at the Prostar Stadium, Shrewsbury in the 1st round proper of the F.A. Cup to reach the second round of the competition. The second round draw saw Staines Town drawn at home to the winners of the following evening's first-round game of Millwall vs AFC Wimbledon, which Millwall won 4–1.

On 28 November 2009 they earned a place in the 3rd round Draw for the first time ever after a 1–1 draw against League One Millwall, Ali Chaaban scoring a 79th-minute penalty to level the score after having gone behind ten minutes earlier, in front of a 2,753 crowd. The replay at the New Den was on 9 December and was broadcast live on the FA.com website. A home tie against Championship side Derby County in the 3rd round awaited the winners of the replay, which Millwall won 4–0.

There have been two appearances in the last 32 of the FA Trophy, the first back in 1976, losing to Morecambe in a 2nd replay and then in a replay to Halifax Town in 2004 after drawing 1–1 at The Shay in the first match.

Another significant match in the club's history was in 1975 when they beat Italian Amateur cup winners Banco di Roma 3–0 on aggregate (1–0 in Rome, 2–0 in Wheatsheaf Lane) for the Barassi Cup.

Staines have also lifted the Middlesex Senior Cup on no fewer than ten occasions. In 1997 under Chris Wainwright, beating Yeading in a penalty shoot out, whilst the Middlesex Charity Cup was lifted in 1994 with a 4–0 win over Northwood. The latest victory in the Middlesex Senior Cup was in 2013 with a 2–0 win over Ashford Town (Middx).

The Carlsberg Cup (an Isthmian League tournament now abolished) was lifted in 1995 against Boreham Wood where the Swans scored a last minute equaliser from the last experimental 'kick in' in English football.

In the London Senior Cup, Staines were runners up in both 1977 and 1981, the earlier final went to a replay versus Wimbledon which 'The Dons' won in their last match as a non-League club.

=== Recent history ===
Since 2018, Staines Town Football Club has been involved in a prolonged dispute concerning its home ground, Wheatsheaf Park, with London-based investment firm Downing LLP, which held interests in the site. The club’s ownership has continued to defend the club’s position in relation to the dispute.

In December 2020, Fulcrum Sports Investments, the ownership group of the limited company then operating the club, reportedly made an offer to acquire Downing LLP’s interests in Wheatsheaf Park for approximately £2.5 million.

In March 2022, Staines Town FC announced the suspension of its football operations arising from its dispute with its landlord. The club subsequently made a number of allegations concerning Downing LLP, including alleged breaches of the Modern Slavery Act 2015. Those allegations were denied by Downing LLP.

Following relegation from Step 4 at the conclusion of the 2021–22 season, Staines Town FC was due to take a place in the Combined Counties League Premier Division North. However, in July 2022, it was announced that its place would instead be taken by Hilltop FC.

The club’s continuing legal and institutional status was subsequently considered by Spelthorne Borough Council’s Planning Committee. In September 2023, the Committee refused a proposed deed of variation to the Section 106 Agreement relating to Wheatsheaf Park, stating that it was not satisfied that Staines Town Football Club had ceased to exist and that the existing obligations under the agreement could therefore still be fulfilled.

In October 2023, Brentford FC’s B team and Under-18s began playing at Wheatsheaf Park pursuant to an agreement with The Thames Club, the site's owner. Brentford also reached an agreement with representatives of Staines Town FC in support of community football initiatives. The announcement identified Steve Parsons as Secretary of Staines Town FC.

== Records ==
- Isthmian League Premier Division Play-Offs, 2008–09
- FA Cup best performance: Second round proper, 2007–08 and 2009–2010
- FA Trophy best performance: Fourth round, 2003–04
- Record attendance: 2,860 vs Stockport County, FA Cup first round replay, 22 November 2007
- Biggest victory: 14–0 vs Croydon, Isthmian League Division One, 19 March 1994
- Heaviest defeat: 1–18 vs Wycombe Wanderers, Great Western Suburban League, 27 December 1909
- Most appearances: Dickie Watmore, 840
- Most goals: Alan Gregory, 122

== Stadium ==
Wheatsheaf Park was the home of the Staines Town Football Club, situated in Wheatsheaf Lane, Staines-upon-Thames, Middlesex, TW18 2PD. It had been the home of the club since it was purchased in 1951. Like many football stadia, it had changed greatly over time; the most recent of these changes was the development of the main stand in the Wheatsheaf Lane End. Planning permission for this was granted by Spelthorne Council in March 2000, and Staines Town returned to the revamped ground on 22 February 2003. The club boasted a brand new sports bar with Sky Sports football each week and refurbished changing rooms. Wheatsheaf Park was one of the most developed stadiums in its league.

Wheatsheaf Park had a total capacity of 3,009, with 300 seated and 800 in covered terrace. The record league attendance for a match at Wheatsheaf Park was 2,285 vs AFC Wimbledon in 2006. However, one year later Staines had an F.A Cup match against Stockport County and the attendance just crept over the 2,860 mark, setting the club's overall attendance record.

Wheatsheaf Park was also previously the home stadium of Chelsea Ladies Football Club before their move to Kingsmeadow in 2017. In 2015 the ground received its UEFA Stadium Category 1 approval and hosted Chelsea L.F.C home fixtures in the UEFA Women's Champions League.

== Club honours ==
League

- Athenian League Division Two
  - Winners: 1971–72
- Great Western Suburban League Division Two
  - Winners: 1920–21
- Isthmian League Division One
  - Winners (2): 1974–75, 1988–89
- Isthmian League Premier Play-offs
  - Winners: 2008–09
- Spartan League
  - Winners: 1959–60
- West London Alliance Division One
  - Winners: 1899–1900
- West London League Division One
  - Winners: 1900–01
- West Middlesex League
  - Winners: 1904–05

Cup

- Barassi Cup
  - Winners: 1975–76
- El Cañuelo Trophy
  - Winners (4): 1993–94, 1994–95, 1995–96, 1996–97
- Geoff Harvey Memorial Vase
  - Winners: 2010–11
- George Ruffell Shield
  - Winners: 2010–11
- Jim Lawford Memorial Cup
  - Winners: 1999–00
- John Livey Memorial Trophy
  - Winners (2): 1993–94, 2013–14
- London Senior Cup
  - Runners-up (2): 1976–77, 1980–81
- Lord of Ashford Charity Bowl
  - Winners (2): 2001–02, 2010–11
- Melksham Middlesex Charity Shield
  - Winners: 1997–98
- Merthyr Middlesex Charity Shield
  - Winners: 1990–91
- Middlesex Junior Cup
  - Winners (2): 1901–02, 1903–04
- Middlesex Senior Challenge Cup
  - Winners (10): 1974–75, 1975–76, 1976–77, 1987–88, 1989–90, 1993–94, 1996–97, 2009–10, 2010–11, 2012–13
- Middlesex Senior Charity Cup
  - Winners: 1993–94
- Southern Combination Challenge Cup
  - Winners (3): 1964–65, 1966–97, 1994–95
- Spartan League Challenge Cup
  - Winners: 1968–69
- Staines Cottage Hospital Cup
  - Winners: 1925–26
- West Middlesex Cup
  - Winners: 1924–25

== Former players ==
1. Players that have played/managed in the Football League or any foreign equivalent to this level (i.e. fully professional league).
2. Players with full international caps.
3. Players that hold a club record or have captained the club.

- (Montserrat) Adrian Clifton
- (Saudi Arabia) Ahmed Abdulla
- (Nigeria) Joe Aribo
- (Jamaica) Jordaan Brown
- (England) Andy Driscoll
- (United States) Dom Dwyer
- (England) Jerel Ifil
- (Republic of Ireland) Joe O'Cearuill
- (England) Gary MacDonald
- (England) Andre Scarlett
- (England) Steve Scrivens
- (England) David Silman
- (England) Tim Soutar
- (England) Stephen Wilkins
- (Libya) Mohamed Bettamer
- (Philippines) James Younghusband
- (England) David Wheeler
- (England) Gordon Hill
