= London Rangers F.C. =

Association football club in England

Coordinates: 51°32′20.33″N 0°21′17.09″W

London Rangers
- Full name: London Rangers Football Club
- Founded: 1938 (as Ruislip Manor)
- Ground: Brunel University Sport Park
- Chairman: Terry Springer
- Manager: John Cadden
- League: Combined Counties League Development Division
- Website: www.londonrangers.org.uk
Home colours

London Rangers FC is a football club based in Boston Manor in the London Borough of Ealing, United Kingdom.

== History ==
The club was formed in 1938 and was originally named Ruislip Manor.

After the war, the club joined the London League, finishing as runners-up under player-manager Charlie Drinkwater in the 1951–52 season. The club left the London league in 1958 to join the Spartan league and stayed in that league until the 1965–66 season after when they joined the Athenian league. Starting in Division two, they remained there for seven seasons, and they were promoted as Champions in the 1972–73 season. Another 12 seasons passed and the club left the Athenian league, and joined the Isthmian League in Division Two South, winning promotion to Division One in the 1992–93 season. At the end of the 1995–96 season, the club would have been relegated to Division Two, but left the Isthmian League and joined the Spartan League, becoming founder members of the Spartan South Midlands League Premier Division South, the following season.

At the end of the 2007–08 season, the club was relegated to Division one, and became homeless after losing their Grosvenor Vale ground, because of the financial problems of the social club there. The football club's committee resigned due to the loss of the ground, and Terry Springer from the Tokyngton Community Centre took on the old club debts, and changed the club's name to Tokyngton Manor. A new ground was found at the Viking Sports ground in Greenford. During the 2009/10 season, the club had to postpone several matches due to an unsafe ground. Despite not being responsible for the upkeep of the ground, they were punished with a one-year ban from the Spartan South Midlands League, so moved to the Hayes Middlesex Sunday League Premier Division for the 2010–11 season, which they won. The club rejoined the Spartan South Midlands League for the 2011–12 season, moving to their new home of Spratleys Meadow, ground sharing with Amersham Town.

The club sat out of the 2012–13 season, and played in the Middlesex County League in Division Two at the start of the 2013–14 season before folding.

During the summer of 2017, the club entered an affiliation agreement with Rangers FC in Glasgow and was rebranded as London Rangers FC. The club played one season in the Hellenic League Division Two East before moving sideways into the Middlesex County Football League. Ahead of the 2023–2024 season, the club moved to the newly created Combined Counties League Division Two

== Honours ==
- Isthmian League Division Two :
  - Runners-up: 1992–93
- Athenian League Division Two:
  - Winners: 1972–73
- London League:
  - Runners-up: 1951–52

== Records ==
- Highest League Position: 17th in Isthmian League Division One 1994–95
- FA Cup best performance: fourth qualifying round – 1990–91
- FA Trophy best performance: second qualifying round – 1995–96
- FA Vase best performance: third round – 1977–78, 1980–81, 1981–82

== Former players ==
1. Players that have played/managed in the football league or any foreign equivalent to this level (i.e. fully professional league).
2. Players with full international caps.

- (England) Paul Barrowcliff
- (England) Dave Carroll
- (England) Derek Gibbs
- (England) Len Roe
- (England) David Silman
- (England) Stephen Wilkins
