= Feltham F.C. (1946) =

Feltham
- Full name: Feltham Football Club
- Founded: 1946
- Dissolved: 1991
- Ground: Rectory Meadow, Hanworth; Ordnance Depot, Feltham; Glebelands Playing Fields, Feltham; Feltham Sports Arena, Feltham

Feltham Football Club was a semi-professional football club in Feltham, Greater London, England.

== History ==
The club was established in 1946 when Hanworth Corinthians, who had been founded at the start of World War II were renamed Tudor Park. A Tudor Park had previously been formed in the mid-1930s, but was dissolved after two seasons. The new club began in Sunday league, joining the West Middlesex Sunday League. In 1949 they entered Saturday football, joining the Staines & District League. The club went on to win the league and cup double in 1950–51. Later in the 1950s the club transferred to the Hounslow & District League. They were runners-up in the Premier Division in 1956–57 and 1957–58, after which the club joined the Parthenon League in 1959.

Tudor Park remained in the Parthenon League until 1963, when they changed their name to Feltham and joined the Surrey Senior League. They were league runners-up in 1965–66, and after finishing third in 1967–68, transferred to the Spartan League, where they remained for four seasons before moving to Division Two of the Athenian League. In 1977 Feltham joined Division Two of the Isthmian League. After winning the division in 1980–81, they were promoted to Division One. However, they were relegated to Division One South at the end of the 1983–84 season after finishing bottom of the table. They won the Southern Combination Challenge Cup in both 1986–87 and 1987–88, and were runners-up in 1990–91.

In 1991 the club merged with Hounslow to form Feltham & Hounslow Borough, which was later renamed Feltham.

== Ground ==
The club initially played at Rectory Meadow in Hanworth, later relocating to the Ordnance Depot in Feltham. They subsequently moved to the Glebelands Playing Fields and then the Feltham Sports Arena.

== Honours ==
- Isthmian League
  - Division One champions 1980–81
- Southern Combination Challenge Cup
  - Winners 1986–87, 1987–88
- Staines & District League
  - Champions 1950–51
  - League Cup winners 1950–51

== Records ==
- Best FA Cup performance: Third qualifying round, 1977–78, 1982–83
- Best FA Trophy performance: First qualifying round, 1974–75, 1982–83
- Best FA Vase performance: Third round, 1975–76
- Record attendance: 1,938 vs Hampton, Middlesex Senior Cup, 1972–73

== See also ==
- Feltham F.C. players
