= Walthamstow Avenue F.C. =

Walthamstow Avenue
- Full name: Walthamstow Avenue Football Club
- Nicknames: The Stow, The A's
- Founded: 1900
- Dissolved: 1988
- Ground: Green Pond Road, London
| Home colours | Away colours |

Walthamstow Avenue Football Club was an English football club based in Walthamstow in London. Based at Green Pond Road, they played in dark and light blue hooped shirts, and light blue shorts. The club was established in 1900, and was one of the most successful amateur clubs in the country during the 1950s. The club ceased to exist in 1988 when it merged with Leytonstone/Ilford, who later became Redbridge Forest and merged with Dagenham to form Dagenham and Redbridge. They have since been revived as an amateur football club, currently playing in the Sunday Essex Corinthian League.

== History ==
Founded in 1900, the club joined Division Two of the London League in 1901, but left at the end of the season. In 1929 they joined the Athenian League and won the league in their first season. In 1930–31 they reached the first round of the FA Cup for the first time, losing 5–1 at home to Watford. The club won back-to-back titles in 1932–33 and 1933–34, and in 1936-37 defeated Football League opposition in the FA Cup for the first time, beating Northampton Town 6–1 in the first round, before losing 3–2 to Exeter City in the second round. The following season they won the Athenian League title for a fourth time, before retaining it the following season.

After World War II the club switched to the Isthmian League, and were its first post-war champions in the 1945–46 season. In 1951–52 they won the FA Amateur Cup, defeating Leyton 2–1 in the final. They won the league again in 1952–53, a season in which they also reached the fourth round of the FA Cup. Entering at the first round stage as a reward for winning the Amateur Cup the previous season, they defeated Wimbledon in the first round, Watford in a second round replay, and Stockport County in the third round, becoming the first amateur club to reach the fourth round for 24 years. Drawn away to Old Trafford, they held Manchester United to a 1–1 draw, before losing the replay, which was moved to Highbury, 5–2.

The following season saw the club defeat Gillingham in the first round of the FA Cup before losing to Ipswich Town in a second round replay. In 1954–55 they won their third and final Isthmian League title, and also reached the second round of the FA Cup again after defeating QPR in a second replay in the first round, the last time they defeated a Football League club. In 1960–61 the club won the Amateur Cup, defeating West Auckland Town 2–1 in the final.

In 1986–87 the club finished bottom of the Premier Division of the Isthmian League, and were relegated to Division One. The 1987–88 was the club's last one, with the club merging into Leytonstone/Ilford, who were later renamed Redbridge Forest.

== Modern-day side ==
A modern-day Walthamstow Avenue, registered as Walthamstow Avenue 2000, was formed on what would have been the original Walthamstow Avenue's centenary anniversary in 2000. Playing at Town Mead in Waltham Abbey, they competed in the London County League for three seasons, before switching to the Middlesex County Football League for the 2003–04 season. In 2005 they merged with Walthamstow Pennant (founded in 2002, and themselves a revival of a team that merged with Leyton in 1995) to form Walthamstow Avenue & Pennant. The new club merged with Mauritius Sports in 2007 to form Mauritius Sports & Pennant. Since the previous revival, Walthamstow Avenue has been revived as an Amateur Sunday League side based in Leyton.

== Colours ==
The club's colours were light and dark blue hoops.

== Honours ==
Athenian League

- Winners (5): 1929–30, 1932–33, 1933–34, 1937–38, 1938–39

Isthmian League

- Winners (3): 1945–46, 1952–53, 1954–55

London Senior Cup

- Winners (9): 1935–36, 1936–37, 1939–40, 1941–42, 1943–44, 1952-53 (shared), 1954–55, 1977–78, 1985–86

Essex Senior Cup

- Winners (12): 1932–33, 1935–36, 1938–39, 1955–56, 1957–58, 1958–59, 1959–60, 1968–69, 1971–72, 1973–74, 1976–77, 1984–85

FA Amateur Cup

- Winners (2): 1951–52, 1960–61

London Charity Cup

- Winners (1): 1933–34

== Former players ==
1. Players that have played/managed in the Football League or any foreign equivalent to this level (i.e. fully professional league).
2. Players with full international caps.
3. Players that hold a club record.

- (England) David Silman
- (England) Stephen Wilkins
- (England) Robin Friday
- (England) Arthur Hitchins
- (England) Jimmy Bloomfield
- (England) David Crown
- (England) Derek Saunders
- (England) Sonny Walters
- (England) Don Rossiter
- (England) Gary McGuire
- (England) Vic Groves
- (England) Jim Lewis
